= List of mountains of the British Isles by height (1001–1500) =

Highest mountains in Great Britain ("Simms" classification)
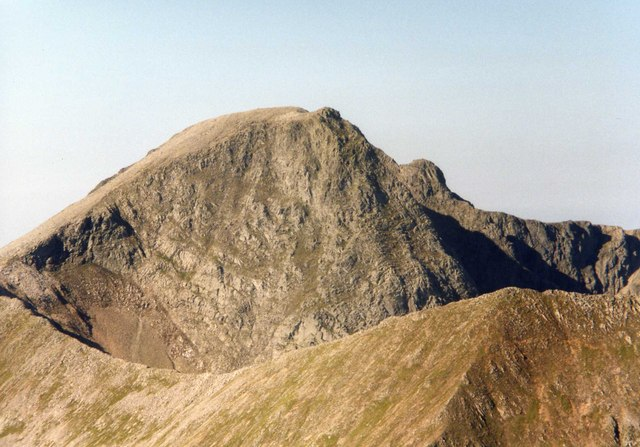
- Ben Nevis, in the Scottish Highlands, is the highest mountain in The British Isles

Highest point
- Elevation: over 600 m (1,969 ft)
- Prominence: over 30 m (98 ft)

Geography
- Location: 2,756 British Isles: 2,192 Scotland; 223 Ireland (Note: As of October 2018, the Irish MountainViews Online Database, list the prominence of Knockbrinnea (W) as 29m, and Carrignabinnia as 27 m, and thus they do not qualify as Irish Arderins, which means that MountainViews does not classify these two peaks as Simms; the total number of Irish Arderins over 600 m is thus 222. The DoBIH however uses the Harvey Tables which list the prominence for both at 30 m, and thus the DoBIH class them as Irish Simms, giving 224 Irish Simms in total.); 192 England; 150 Wales; 1 Isle of Man

This article provides access to lists of mountains in Britain and Ireland by height and by prominence. (See Lists of mountains below.) Height and prominence are the most important metrics for the classifications of mountains by the UIAA; with isolation a distant third criterion. (Note: No definition of a British Isles mountain or hill uses an explicit quantitative metric of topographic isolation (e.g. distance to the next point of equal height), however, the concept of isolation is embedded in the qualitative definition of a Scottish Munro, from the Scottish Mountaineering Club requirement of "sufficient separation" (instead of prominence).) The list is sourced from the Database of British and Irish Hills ("DoBIH") (Note: The Database of British and Irish Hills ("DoBIH") is the most referenced database for the classification of peaks in the British Isles, and the DoBIH is licensed under a "Creative Commons Attribution 3.0 Unported License".) for peaks that meet the consensus height threshold for a mountain, namely 600 metres (1,969 ft); the list also rules out peaks with a prominence below 30 metres (98 ft) and thus, the list is therefore precisely a list of the 2,756 (Note: Some sites list 2753 Simms, however, the Database of British and Irish Hills ("DoBIH") has added an extra Irish Simm, Knockbrinnea (W), bringing the total as at October 2022 to 2756.) Simms in the British Isles (as at October 2022). Many classifications of mountains in the British Isles consider a prominence between 30–150 metres (98–492 ft) as being a "top", and not a mountain; however, using the 30 metres (98 ft) prominence threshold gives the broadest possible list of mountains. For a ranking of mountains with a higher prominence threshold use:

- List of Marilyns in the British Isles, for ranking by height and by prominence, of peaks with prominence over 150 metres (492 ft); or
- List of P600 mountains in the British Isles, for ranking by height and by prominence, of peaks with prominence over 600 metres (1,969 ft)

== Coverage of Simms ==
Despite using the lower threshold for prominence of 30 metres (98 ft), the UIAA threshold for an "independent" peak, one Scottish Munro is missing, namely Maoile Lunndaidh whose official prominence changed to 11 metres (36 ft) in 2014; (Note: 281 of the 282 Scottish Munros have an official OSI prominence above 30 m, except Maoile Lunndaidh, who was found in a 2014 survey to be lower than nearby Creag Toll a' Choin. Thus, Maoile Lunndaidh had its official prominence downgraded from 400 m to just under 11 m, and the 400 m of prominence given to Creag Toll a' Choin. Note that Creag Toll a' Choin had previously been a Munro until older surveys downgraded its status in favour of Maoile Lunndaidh.) (Note: There is no known "composite" list of British Isles mountains that merges the Munro definition with other defined lists; the closest defined lists that include almost all Munros, are those that reduce the minimum prominence threshold to 30 metres (98 ft).) As of October 2018, the list of 2,754 British Isles Simms contained:

1. 281 of the 282 Munros, and 158 of the 226 Munro Tops;
2. All 222 Corbetts, all 219 Grahams, and all 118 Scottish New Donalds;
3. 872 of the 2,011 British Isles Marilyns;
4. All 524 of the England, Wales, and Ireland Hewitts;
5. 117 of the 541 Lake District Birketts (of which 99 are Wainwrights), that meet the Simms criteria;
6. All 224 of the 407 Irish Arderins with a height above 600.0 m;
7. All of the 120 P600 ("major") mountains in the British Isles;
8. 33 of the 34 England, Wales and Ireland Furths. (Note: 33 of the 34 SMC Furths have a prominence above 30 metres (98 feet), however, Caher West Top in Ireland, has a prominence of 24 metres (79 feet).)

== Simms by height by prominence ==
This list was downloaded from the DoBIH in October 2018, and includes all British and Irish peaks with a prominence below 30 metres (98 ft). Note that topographical prominence is complex to measure and requires a survey of the entire contours of a peak, rather than a single point of height. These tables are therefore subject to being revised over time, and should not be amended or updated unless the entire DoBIH data is re-downloaded again. The default table ranking is by height, so where the table is sorted by for example Region, the table will list the mountains within each Region by order of height.

Regional Top: The highest mountain in England, Wales, Scotland, Ireland, or the Isle of Man

== Lists of mountains ==
- List of mountains of the British Isles by height (1–500)
- List of mountains of the British Isles by height (501–1000)
- List of mountains of the British Isles by height (1001–1500)
- List of mountains of the British Isles by height (1501–2000)
- List of mountains of the British Isles by height (2001–2500)
- List of mountains of the British Isles by height (2501–3000)

Britain and Ireland mountains ranked by height and by prominence, Simms classification (DoBIH, October 2018)
Height Total	Prom. Total	Region	Height Region	Prom. Region	Name	Height (m)	Prom. (m)	Height (ft)	Prom. (ft)	Map Sec.	Topo Map	OS Grid Reference	Classification (§ DoBIH codes)
1001	669	Scotland	902	502	Beinn na h-Eaglaise	805	201	2,641	659	10A	33	[57.148573188914;-5.549244176431 NG854120]	Ma,C,Sim
1002	1223	Scotland	903	936	Baosbheinn East Top	805	102	2,641	335	13A	19 24	[57.625713691157;-5.557172914595 NG877651]	Hu,Sim
1003	1341	Scotland	904	1031	Poll-gormack Hill	805	91	2,641	299	09B	34	[57.043976340533;-4.6553681902273 NN390979]	Sim,sHu
1004	1896	Scotland	905	1476	Sgurr na Feartaig Far West Top	805	56	2,641	184	12A	25	[57.451858432461;-5.2717731476998 NH038449]	Sim
1005	1762	Wales	33	101	Y Foel Goch	805	63	2,641	207	30B	115	[53.104540930825;-3.9776598715053 SH677582]	Sim,Hew,N
1006	1538	Scotland	906	1194	Carn Macoul	804	77	2,639	252	09B	35	[57.07444258047;-4.246692320019 NH639004]	Sim
1007	838	Scotland	907	631	Geal Charn	804	156	2,638	512	10C	34	[57.002021245835;-5.0377783542776 NN156942]	Ma,C,Sim
1008	985	Scotland	908	746	Carn Bheadhair	804	133	2,638	436	08B	36	[57.185417124578;-3.5667192342882 NJ054116]	Hu,Sim
1009	1981	Scotland	909	1546	Meall a' Choire Ghlais	804	52	2,638	171	15A	20	[57.829212383171;-4.9100049089576 NH273859]	Sim
1010	1382	Scotland	910	1064	Ceann Garbh	804	88	2,638	289	01D	50 56	[56.340670340848;-4.8781573945665 NN222202]	Sim
1011	2673	Scotland	911	2120	Meall Garbh	804	31	2,638	102	03B	50	[56.536650777102;-5.2070004448471 NN029429]	Sim
1012	347	Scotland	912	255	Carn Mor	804	349	2,638	1,145	21A	37	[57.249460147399;-3.219723455625 NJ265183]	Ma,C,Sim
1013	830	Ireland	31	100	Ben Lugmore	803	158	2,635	518	47A	37	[53.642140873174;-9.7985495299451 L811673]	Ma,Sim,Hew,Dil,A,VL
1014	804	Scotland	913	606	The Sow of Atholl	803	166	2,635	545	05A	42	[56.837950529106;-4.2554537922837 NN625741]	Ma,C,Sim
1015	933	Scotland	914	705	Druim Garbh	803	141	2,635	463	18B	40	[56.757984152829;-5.4680796598102 NM881683]	Hu,Sim,sMa,xC
1016	1720	Scotland	915	1338	Am Meadar	803	66	2,634	216	05B	42	[56.882386910709;-4.1301008856556 NN703788]	Sim
1017	2560	Scotland	916	2023	Meall Tionail	803	33	2,634	109	06A	43	[56.876253628212;-3.7752868127271 NN919775]	Sim
1018	264	Wales	34	15	Fan Brycheiniog	803	425	2,633	1,394	32A	160	[51.884118365565;-3.7100313857636 SN824220]	Ma,Sim,Hew,N
1019	274	England	38	12	The Old Man of Coniston	802	415	2,633	1,362	34D	96 97	[54.370486455253;-3.1220790673788 SD272978]	Ma,Sim,Hew,N,W,B,Sy,Fel,CoH
1020	1077	England	39	75	Swirl How	802	120	2,633	394	34D	89 90	[54.394746898581;-3.1227411975366 NY272005]	Hu,Sim,Hew,N,W,B,Sy,Fel
1021	998	Scotland	917	757	Meall Breac	802	131	2,631	430	02A	42 51	[56.659695544199;-4.2235791892833 NN638542]	Hu,Sim
1022	1262	Scotland	918	966	Ben Earb	802	99	2,631	325	06B	43	[56.8042732678;-3.5098368434054 NO079691]	Sim,sHu
1023	1934	Scotland	919	1506	Meall na Brachdlach	802	54	2,631	177	04B	42	[56.90825794559;-4.435453240399 NN518823]	Sim
1024	2079	Scotland	920	1625	Carn Odhar	802	48	2,631	157	09B	35	[57.230596292438;-4.2578404055449 NH638178]	Sim
1025	739	England	40	45	Kirk Fell	802	181	2,631	594	34B	89 90	[54.482520389111;-3.2455403073051 NY194104]	Ma,Sim,Hew,N,W,B,Sy,Fel
1026	1390	England	41	94	High Raise (High Street)	802	88	2,631	289	34C	90	[54.512882297719;-2.8541225381648 NY448134]	Sim,Hew,N,W,B,Sy,Fel
1027	816	Ireland	32	99	Greenane	802	160	2,631	525	53A	74	[52.367073175763;-8.1108336548619 R925239]	Ma,Sim,Hew,Dil,A,VL
1028	617	Scotland	921	465	Beinn Bhreac-liath	802	215	2,631	705	03C	50	[56.466546931829;-4.7577835518875 NN302339]	Ma,C,Sim
1029	1849	Scotland	922	1442	Meikle Geal Charn	802	58	2,631	190	08B	36	[57.130723358865;-3.323199356075 NJ200052]	Sim
1030	2714	Scotland	923	2156	Meall Coire na Gaoithe'n Ear	801	31	2,629	100	10B	33 40	[57.038895695313;-5.517328540509 NM867997]	Sim
1031	143	Scotland	924	97	Cranstackie	801	560	2,628	1,837	16B	9	[58.457384483784;-4.8297312837214 NC350556]	Ma,C,Sim
1032	348	Scotland	925	256	Meallan Liath Coire Mhic Dhughaill	801	349	2,628	1,145	16B	15	[58.309636468564;-4.8059618643225 NC357391]	Ma,C,Sim
1033	1361	Scotland	926	1048	Burrach Mor South Top	801	90	2,628	295	09B	35	[57.1353345686;-4.356151455509 NH575074]	Sim,sHu
1034	1448	Scotland	927	1116	Creag an Fhithich	801	82	2,628	269	13A	19 24	[57.640245189134;-5.5837412120082 NG862668]	Sim
1035	1874	Scotland	928	1460	Sgor Dearg	801	57	2,628	187	05B	42	[56.935666510451;-4.060815064587 NN747846]	Sim
1036	2031	England	42	135	Green Gable	801	50	2,628	164	34B	89 90	[54.485529995208;-3.2147587846555 NY214107]	Sim,Hew,N,W,B,Sy,Fel
1037	1559	Scotland	929	1211	Ferrowie	801	75	2,628	246	07B	44	[56.90068316637;-3.1459384130659 NO303794]	Sim
1038	1170	Scotland	930	895	Lochcraig Head	801	108	2,627	354	28B	79	[55.446037445143;-3.3199875604986 NT166177]	Hu,Sim,D
1039	2105	Wales	35	122	Pen y Gadair Fawr	800	47	2,625	154	32A	161	[51.951425895483;-3.1232582548451 SO229287]	Sim,Hew,N
1040	2156	Scotland	931	1689	Meall nan Sleac	800	45	2,625	148	08A	35 36 43	[57.026774117982;-3.8664874063752 NN868944]	Sim
1041	2537	Scotland	932	2005	Monadh an t-Sluichd Leith	800	34	2,625	112	21A	37	[57.238634813877;-3.2243365085256 NJ262171]	Sim
1042	1473	Ireland	33	154	Galtybeg	799	80	2,622	263	53A	74	[52.367910617891;-8.1636868119649 R889240]	Sim,Hew,Dil,A,VL
1043	766	Scotland	933	573	Cir Mhor	799	175	2,621	574	20C	62 69	[55.639021514326;-5.223796180728 NR972431]	Ma,C,Sim
1044	35	Scotland	934	28	An Cliseam	799	799	2,621	2,621	24B	13 14	[57.963645737433;-6.8139575897513 NB154073]	Ma,C,Sim,CoU,CoA,SIB
1045	1897	Scotland	935	1477	Braigh Coire Caochan nan Laogh	799	56	2,621	184	06A	43	[56.915802603072;-3.7098137435633 NN960818]	Sim
1046	742	Wales	36	46	Pen Llithrig y Wrach	799	180	2,620	592	30B	115	[53.141430055257;-3.9210430075681 SH716622]	Ma,Sim,Hew,N
1047	584	Scotland	936	435	Am Bathach	798	231	2,618	758	11A	33	[57.17891432291;-5.1896609420703 NH073143]	Ma,C,Sim
1048	2353	Scotland	937	1851	Faire nam Fiadh	798	38	2,618	125	14B	20	[57.657921621754;-4.9331536060303 NH251669]	Sim
1049	2032	Ireland	34	189	Stradbally Mountain	798	50	2,618	164	49B	70	[52.21600766689;-10.068158925898 Q587091]	Sim,Hew,Dil,A,VL
1050	1961	Scotland	938	1528	Guala Mhor	798	53	2,618	174	02A	51	[56.576013742837;-4.5996622116051 NN404457]	Sim
1051	1905	Scotland	939	1483	Beinn Bhreac	798	56	2,617	183	02B	51	[56.46429129382;-4.4361663075102 NN500329]	Sim
1052	2321	Scotland	940	1822	Meall nam Fuaran North Top	797	39	2,615	128	01A	52	[56.510208066192;-3.9190242075745 NN820370]	Sim
1053	255	Scotland	941	189	Beinn Dronaig	797	434	2,615	1,424	12A	25	[57.390832994315;-5.2679932385802 NH037381]	Ma,C,Sim
1054	1303	Scotland	942	1002	Carn Dearg	797	94	2,615	308	16B	16	[58.308586071469;-4.7717317211743 NC377389]	Sim,sHu
1055	2322	Scotland	943	1823	Carn na Laraiche Maoile South Top	797	39	2,615	128	09B	35	[57.15508046416;-4.3574074896134 NH575096]	Sim
1056	2495	Scotland	944	1971	Sgurr na Feartaig West Top	797	35	2,615	115	12A	25	[57.453910944757;-5.2619511541014 NH044451]	Sim
1057	130	Scotland	945	89	Cairnsmore of Carsphairn	797	582	2,615	1,909	27C	77	[55.255165787219;-4.2136871006244 NX594979]	Ma,C,Sim,D
1058	1304	England	43	88	Haycock	797	94	2,615	308	34B	89	[54.48439594795;-3.3227782591989 NY144107]	Sim,Hew,N,sHu,W,B,Sy,Fel
1059	2674	Scotland	946	2121	Geal Charn NE Top	797	31	2,615	102	06B	43	[56.95443106299;-3.5734560135368 NO044859]	Sim
1060	1355	Scotland	947	1042	Creag a' Chaorainn	797	90	2,613	297	02A	51	[56.560238331287;-4.5367308218481 NN442438]	Sim,sHu
1061	188	Scotland	948	132	Sgurr an Utha	796	499	2,612	1,637	10D	40	[56.898051095895;-5.4744932143932 NM885839]	Ma,C,Sim
1062	193	Scotland	949	136	Beinn Bhan	796	495	2,612	1,624	10D	34 41	[56.925130789714;-5.057821970632 NN140857]	Ma,C,Sim
1063	229	Scotland	950	164	Mam na Gualainn	796	461	2,612	1,512	04A	41	[56.716006622579;-5.0816824328667 NN115625]	Ma,C,Sim
1064	424	Scotland	951	315	Sgurr Coire Choinnichean	796	304	2,612	997	10B	33	[57.04692535121;-5.6450992394848 NG790010]	Ma,C,Sim
1065	267	Scotland	952	198	Beinn Mhic-Mhonaidh	796	420	2,612	1,378	03C	50	[56.472935863149;-4.9109027932097 NN208350]	Ma,C,Sim
1066	1817	Ireland	35	174	Ben Bury	795	60	2,608	197	47A	37	[53.650017796784;-9.8124969440197 L802682]	Sim,Hew,Dil,A,VL
1067	1006	Wales	37	61	Cribyn	795	130	2,608	427	32A	160	[51.881673219544;-3.4208091683417 SO023213]	Hu,Sim,Hew,N
1068	1315	Scotland	953	1011	Beinn Tharsuinn West Top	795	93	2,608	305	12A	25	[57.434138220906;-5.261856506606 NH043429]	Sim,sHu
1069	1598	Scotland	954	1240	Leacann Chorrach	795	72	2,608	236	09B	35	[57.062441338618;-4.3135920768748 NN598992]	Sim
1070	2675	Scotland	955	2122	Beinn an Tuim South Top	795	31	2,608	102	10D	40	[56.894701328937;-5.4002622184305 NM930833]	Sim
1071	2735	England	44	188	Green Side	795	30	2,608	98	34C	90	[54.559366911543;-3.003547421399 NY352187]	Sim,Hew,N,B,Sy
1072	2255	Ireland	36	202	Mullaghcleevaun East Top	795	41	2,608	135	55B	56	[53.100202070232;-6.3853659948206 O082067]	Sim,Hew,Dil,A,VL
1073	1145	Scotland	956	876	Creag Loisgte	795	110	2,608	361	07A	43	[56.965055451481;-3.3567934653349 NO176868]	Hu,Sim
1074	51	Ireland	37	8	Mount Leinster	794	726	2,606	2,382	54B	68	[52.617858623297;-6.7811749849965 S826525]	Ma,Sim,Hew,Dil,A,VL,CoH,CoU
1075	896	Scotland	957	674	Meall Uaine	794	146	2,605	479	06B	43	[56.788712012553;-3.458462761034 NO110673]	Hu,Sim,sMa,xC
1076	1478	Scotland	958	1143	Maol Odhar	794	80	2,605	262	18C	49	[56.664725117353;-5.4594992919479 NM881579]	Sim
1077	2052	Scotland	959	1605	Creag Iobhair	794	49	2,605	161	15A	20	[57.841239166546;-4.8553635052451 NH306871]	Sim
1078	2080	England	45	142	Knock Fell	794	48	2,605	157	35A	91	[54.666099475038;-2.4340739247636 NY721302]	Sim,Hew,N
1079	2157	Ireland	38	195	Corrigasleggaun	794	45	2,605	148	55A	56	[52.959879876292;-6.4426880814092 T047910]	Sim,Hew,Dil,A,VL
1080	2636	Ireland	39	221	Ben Lugmore East Top	793	32	2,602	105	47A	37	[53.64133352395;-9.7924665698034 L815672]	Sim,Hew,A,VL
1081	2106	Scotland	960	1647	Sron Odhar	793	47	2,602	154	06A	42	[56.880795219553;-4.0643583368609 NN743785]	Sim
1082	2354	Scotland	961	1852	Sgurr Sgeithe	793	38	2,602	125	10B	33 40	[57.025168608349;-5.5259213014273 NM861982]	Sim
1083	1935	Scotland	962	1507	Little Hills East	793	54	2,602	177	01D	50 56	[56.272927637821;-4.734132352398 NN308123]	Sim
1084	2652	Scotland	963	2100	Sgurr Creag an Eich West Top	793	32	2,601	105	14A	19	[57.808175137455;-5.2922181958539 NH045846]	Sim
1085	71	Ireland	40	13	Knockmealdown	792	678	2,600	2,224	54A	74	[52.227803424553;-7.9173111932856 S057084]	Ma,Sim,Hew,Dil,A,VL,CoH,CoU
1086	2567	Scotland	964	2030	Carn Dearg	792	33	2,599	109	06A	35 43	[56.989453566321;-3.9567947626097 NN812904]	Sim
1087	2538	Scotland	965	2006	Meall Taurnie	792	34	2,598	112	02B	51	[56.515966772041;-4.4589901731379 NN488387]	Sim
1088	1029	Scotland	966	782	Geal Charn	792	127	2,598	417	02A	42 51	[56.662723592324;-4.1535884183459 NN681544]	Hu,Sim
1089	2496	Scotland	967	1972	Uchd a' Chlarsair	792	35	2,598	115	06A	43	[56.915038128132;-3.9463270569855 NN816821]	Sim
1090	1438	Scotland	968	1106	Beinn Nuis	792	83	2,598	272	20C	68 69	[55.609602923275;-5.24838090408 NR955399]	Sim
1091	194	Scotland	969	137	Beinn Leoid	792	495	2,598	1,624	16E	15	[58.221225870497;-4.8619936378722 NC320294]	Ma,C,Sim
1092	211	Scotland	970	150	Beinn Airigh Charr	792	477	2,598	1,565	14A	19	[57.726800629101;-5.4780420643038 NG930761]	Ma,C,Sim
1093	304	Scotland	971	226	Glas Bheinn	792	388	2,598	1,273	04A	41	[56.735918373318;-4.8494492682095 NN258641]	Ma,C,Sim
1094	636	Scotland	972	480	Sgùrr a' Chaorachain	792	210	2,598	689	13B	24	[57.41207268356;-5.6713507071066 NG796417]	Ma,C,Sim
1095	2081	Scotland	973	1626	Mullach a' Ghlas-thuill	792	48	2,598	157	12B	25	[57.339584375589;-5.0539836751646 NH163318]	Sim
1096	2033	England	46	136	Dove Crag	792	50	2,598	164	34C	90	[54.485064003299;-2.9677674936373 NY374104]	Sim,Hew,N,W,B,Sy,Fel
1097	2256	England	47	151	Rampsgill Head	792	41	2,598	135	34C	90	[54.507435973728;-2.8617309813362 NY443128]	Sim,Hew,N,W,B,Sy,Fel
1098	98	Ireland	41	19	Fauscoum	792	628	2,598	2,060	54A	75	[52.245799517174;-7.5380872129199 S316105]	Ma,Sim,Hew,Dil,A,VL
1099	839	Scotland	974	632	Carn Ealasaid	792	156	2,598	512	08B	36	[57.189560808937;-3.2806260624687 NJ227117]	Ma,C,Sim
1100	2107	Scotland	975	1648	Carn Liath	792	47	2,598	154	21A	37	[57.227711692406;-3.238881974758 NJ253159]	Sim
1101	2158	Scotland	976	1690	Sgor Mor North Top	792	45	2,598	148	06B	43	[56.940482331552;-3.4643835118819 NO110842]	Sim
1102	1494	Wales	38	84	Craig Cwm Amarch	792	79	2,598	260	30F	124	[52.691174650533;-3.9100900477226 SH710121]	Sim,Hew,N
1103	2053	Scotland	977	1606	Sron na Faiceachan	791	49	2,595	161	06A	43	[56.873507827205;-3.9589361030526 NN807775]	Sim
1104	1546	Scotland	978	1199	Glas Charn	791	76	2,595	249	09B	34	[57.040910433139;-4.7145005750388 NN354977]	Sim
1105	2399	Scotland	979	1890	Carn Coire na h-Easgainn	791	37	2,595	121	09B	35	[57.195732802728;-4.0918378116432 NH737136]	Sim
1106	711	England	48	44	Grisedale Pike	791	189	2,595	620	34B	89 90	[54.591299132151;-3.2426675443437 NY198225]	Ma,Sim,Hew,N,W,B,Sy,Fel
1107	1648	Scotland	980	1278	Beinn Bhoidheach	790	70	2,593	229	05A	42	[56.759004331576;-4.3456083937127 NN567655]	Sim
1108	2481	Scotland	981	1958	Meall nan Aighean	790	36	2,593	117	02A	51	[56.606965910043;-4.4926063693777 NN471489]	Sim
1109	2159	Ireland	42	196	Ben Lugmore West Top	790	45	2,592	148	47A	37	[53.64469832338;-9.8077320002703 L805676]	Sim,Hew,A,VL
1110	2229	Scotland	982	1748	Meall Tionail na Beinne Brice	790	42	2,592	138	06A	43	[56.911291404591;-3.8377233644723 NN882815]	Sim
1111	1910	Scotland	983	1488	Fraoch-bheinn	790	55	2,592	180	10D	40	[56.896667327143;-5.4595796990625 NM894837]	Sim
1112	628	England	49	37	Mickle Fell	790	212	2,592	696	35A	91 92	[54.61527678786;-2.3019140999859 NY806245]	Ma,Sim,Hew,N,CoH,CoU,CoA
1113	1585	Scotland	984	1231	Meall an Fhiodhain West Top	789	73	2,589	240	01C	51	[56.393114533149;-4.3992090578692 NN520249]	Sim
1114	634	Scotland	985	478	Auchnafree Hill	789	211	2,589	692	01A	52	[56.454236643835;-3.9356736140041 NN808308]	Ma,C,Sim
1115	158	Scotland	986	110	Meall Dubh	789	544	2,589	1,785	10C	34	[57.127503962225;-4.9009685545193 NH245078]	Ma,C,Sim
1116	342	Scotland	987	250	Druim nan Cnamh	789	354	2,589	1,161	10A	34	[57.121175106013;-5.0904991282769 NH130076]	Ma,C,Sim
1117	1439	Scotland	988	1107	Sgurr Coire nan Eun	789	83	2,589	272	12A	25	[57.476393084735;-5.0086731312785 NH197469]	Sim
1118	2620	Scotland	989	2073	Sguman Coinntich North Top	789	32	2,588	105	12B	25	[57.32484795514;-5.3502004405797 NG984310]	Sim
1119	1962	Scotland	990	1529	Letterach	788	53	2,585	174	21A	37	[57.270386514824;-3.1922243602948 NJ282206]	Sim
1120	2034	Scotland	991	1589	Carn a' Chuilinn Far East Top	788	50	2,585	164	09B	34	[57.105923225036;-4.5722708188408 NH443046]	Sim
1121	268	Scotland	992	199	Meall Tairneachan	787	420	2,582	1,378	02A	52	[56.665210585086;-3.9481120257418 NN807543]	Ma,C,Sim
1122	1463	Scotland	993	1130	Choinneachain Hill	787	81	2,582	266	01A	52	[56.437428470819;-3.9185983160862 NN818289]	Sim
1123	2676	Scotland	994	2123	Carn Dearg	787	31	2,582	102	05A	42	[56.775897619829;-4.4023152410227 NN533675]	Sim
1124	297	Scotland	995	220	Arkle	787	392	2,582	1,286	16B	9	[58.37033276093;-4.9048524591515 NC302461]	Ma,C,Sim
1125	466	Scotland	996	343	Beinn a' Chaisteil	787	280	2,582	919	15B	20	[57.780779480427;-4.7445984529289 NH369801]	Ma,C,Sim
1126	1146	Scotland	997	877	Creag Dhubh	787	110	2,582	361	09B	35	[57.104816727459;-4.1015713701777 NH728035]	Hu,Sim
1127	1342	Scotland	998	1032	Sgurr Coire nan Gabhar	787	91	2,582	299	10B	33 40	[57.010836735903;-5.6184927014931 NM804969]	Sim,sHu
1128	1411	Scotland	999	1085	Creag a' Chalamain	787	86	2,582	282	08A	36	[57.126835601895;-3.7178796902229 NH961053]	Sim
1129	1731	Scotland	1000	1348	Sgurr Dubh East Top	787	65	2,582	213	14A	19	[57.692177877982;-5.3622506329292 NG997719]	Sim
1130	2035	Scotland	1001	1590	Beinn Coire nan Gall	787	50	2,582	164	18A	40	[56.856061768044;-5.623212251141 NM792797]	Sim
1131	2445	England	50	169	Kirk Fell East Top	787	36	2,582	118	34B	89 90	[54.48529510877;-3.2379064414929 NY199107]	Sim,Hew,N,B,Sy
1132	284	Scotland	1002	212	The Brack	787	403	2,582	1,322	19C	56	[56.187188009651;-4.8295752223874 NN245030]	Ma,C,Sim
1133	872	Scotland	1003	658	Kirriereoch Hill	787	150	2,581	493	27B	77	[55.151144951424;-4.4810278553577 NX420869]	Ma,Sim,D,xC
1134	1087	Scotland	1004	832	Carn Chois	786	118	2,579	387	01A	51 52	[56.425969412689;-3.9618037560073 NN791277]	Hu,Sim
1135	2179	Scotland	1005	1707	Carn Dearg	786	44	2,579	144	06B	43	[56.828690483789;-3.5698168045946 NO043719]	Sim
1136	314	Scotland	1006	233	Carn na Nathrach	786	382	2,579	1,253	18B	40	[56.771661913598;-5.4611560131331 NM886698]	Ma,C,Sim
1137	1343	Scotland	1007	1033	Clach Glas	786	91	2,579	299	17B	32	[57.223011800141;-6.0868135018186 NG534221]	Sim,sHu
1138	2539	Ireland	43	214	Greenane West	786	34	2,579	112	53A	74	[52.367050546779;-8.1328544458391 R910239]	Sim,Hew,Dil,A,VL
1139	2323	Scotland	1008	1824	Molls Cleuch Dod	785	39	2,575	128	28B	79	[55.447575986732;-3.3437542468429 NT151179]	Sim,D
1140	391	Scotland	1009	289	Beinn na Caillich	785	317	2,575	1,040	10B	33	[57.09736864848;-5.6417962111275 NG795066]	Ma,C,Sim
1141	2400	Scotland	1010	1891	Carn a' Chuilinn East Top	785	37	2,575	121	09B	34	[57.099301853244;-4.5883237090754 NH433039]	Sim
1142	1818	England	51	123	Allen Crags	785	60	2,575	197	34B	89 90	[54.466099421725;-3.1802389015339 NY236085]	Sim,Hew,N,W,B,Sy,Fel
1143	39	Scotland	1011	32	Beinn an Oir	785	785	2,575	2,575	20A	60 61	[55.901980807024;-6.0042291307862 NR498749]	Ma,C,Sim,SIB
1144	2016	Scotland	1012	1577	Beinn Losgarnaich	784	50	2,573	165	06A	43	[56.885991818562;-3.9070627459029 NN839788]	Sim
1145	2677	England	52	184	Thornthwaite Crag	784	31	2,572	102	34C	90	[54.482142089005;-2.8797205148886 NY431100]	Sim,Hew,N,W,B,Sy,Fel
1146	196	Ireland	44	38	Stumpa Duloigh	784	494	2,572	1,621	50B	78	[51.953067066147;-9.766553707056 V786793]	Ma,Sim,Hew,Dil,A,VL
1147	1102	Scotland	1013	842	Creag nan Leachda	784	116	2,572	381	07A	43	[56.98127422262;-3.3524470664179 NO179886]	Hu,Sim
1148	1479	Scotland	1014	1144	Top of the Battery	784	80	2,572	262	06B	43	[56.953820471406;-3.5504099289075 NO058858]	Sim
1149	1581	Wales	39	91	Cadair Bronwen	783	73	2,570	240	30E	125	[52.900885543107;-3.3736461422674 SJ077346]	Sim,Hew,N
1150	715	Ireland	45	89	Temple Hill	783	188	2,569	617	53A	74	[52.34799832862;-8.2457893346647 R833218]	Ma,Sim,Hew,Dil,A,VL
1151	441	Scotland	1015	326	Beinn Mhic Cedidh	783	296	2,569	971	18A	40	[56.849689815522;-5.5635271217408 NM828788]	Ma,C,Sim
1152	128	Wales	40	9	Moel Hebog	783	585	2,569	1,919	30B	115	[53.000112242133;-4.1412869794359 SH564469]	Ma,Sim,Hew,N
1153	1065	England	53	74	Glaramara	783	121	2,569	397	34B	89 90	[54.483305867365;-3.1668424836306 NY245104]	Hu,Sim,Hew,N,W,B,Sy,Fel
1154	2710	Scotland	1016	2153	Carn Ban Mor West Top	783	31	2,569	101	08A	35 36 43	[57.058369989187;-3.8565299761316 NN875979]	Sim
1155	725	Scotland	1017	546	Farragon Hill	782	186	2,567	609	02A	52	[56.675019865184;-3.8947537548222 NN840553]	Ma,C,Sim
1156	2230	Scotland	1018	1749	Meall Odhar Ailleag	782	42	2,566	138	06A	43	[56.891515528757;-3.956595326597 NN809795]	Sim
1157	618	Scotland	1019	466	Sgurr Dubh	782	215	2,566	705	13B	25	[57.54611316492;-5.3788645169042 NG979557]	Ma,C,Sim
1158	1763	Scotland	1020	1374	Meall a' Bhealaich	782	63	2,566	207	11A	25 33	[57.236397620744;-5.2957485058047 NH012210]	Sim
1159	1708	Ireland	46	168	Mangerton North Top	782	66	2,566	217	52A	78	[51.979494500326;-9.4794052270651 V984818]	Sim,Hew,Dil,A,VL
1160	2054	Scotland	1021	1607	Leathad na Lice	781	49	2,564	161	06A	42	[56.901030602634;-4.0359160158199 NN761807]	Sim
1161	470	Scotland	1022	345	Corryhabbie Hill	781	278	2,562	912	21A	37	[57.343997719382;-3.1979327051657 NJ280288]	Ma,C,Sim
1162	378	Scotland	1023	279	Ainshval	781	326	2,562	1,070	17D	39	[56.965333794352;-6.3153456619614 NM378943]	Ma,C,Sim
1163	921	Scotland	1024	697	Carn Easgann Bana	781	142	2,562	466	09B	34	[57.122582656082;-4.5040340558598 NH485063]	Hu,Sim,sMa,xC
1164	1747	Scotland	1025	1361	Beinn Bhuraich	781	64	2,562	210	09B	35	[57.210047274438;-4.3493203772374 NH582157]	Sim
1165	2540	Scotland	1026	2007	Carn Mhic Iamhair	781	34	2,562	112	09B	35	[57.200165124079;-4.3006812361101 NH611145]	Sim
1166	2497	Scotland	1027	1973	Creag Tharsuinn	781	35	2,562	115	01D	56	[56.227877540923;-4.7793275274604 NN278074]	Sim
1167	2576	Scotland	1028	2038	Sail Mhor	780	33	2,559	108	14B	20	[57.672845041395;-5.061846120359 NH175689]	Sim
1168	2401	Scotland	1029	1892	Ben Vorlich South Top	780	37	2,559	121	01D	50 56	[56.261082949197;-4.7413617972562 NN303110]	Sim
1169	1435	Scotland	1030	1103	Creag Riabhach	780	83	2,558	273	02A	51	[56.591717297254;-4.5355828565656 NN444473]	Sim
1170	392	Scotland	1031	290	Sgurr Mhic Bharraich	779	317	2,556	1,040	10A	33	[57.198997146389;-5.4497444713218 NG917173]	Ma,C,Sim
1171	2000	Scotland	1032	1562	Carn nam Meirleach	779	51	2,556	167	09B	35	[57.18644855138;-4.1624714584207 NH694127]	Sim
1172	619	Wales	41	38	Glasgwm	779	215	2,556	705	30E	124 125	[52.759625763816;-3.7263500457476 SH836194]	Ma,Sim,Hew,N
1173	875	England	54	55	Harter Fell (Mardale)	779	149	2,556	490	34C	90	[54.476158741521;-2.8363813866063 NY459093]	Hu,Sim,Hew,N,sMa,W,B,Sy,Fel
1174	146	Scotland	1033	99	Beinn Bheula	779	557	2,556	1,827	19C	56	[56.14157775159;-4.972732185894 NS154983]	Ma,C,Sim
1175	1586	Scotland	1034	1232	Meikle Corr Riabhach	779	73	2,556	240	21A	37	[57.205226987773;-3.2414393031424 NJ251134]	Sim
1176	761	Scotland	1035	570	Meall nam Maigheach	779	176	2,555	577	02B	51	[56.562103670295;-4.3024802248207 NN586435]	Ma,C,Sim
1177	1026	Scotland	1036	779	Creag nam Bodach	779	127	2,555	417	02B	51	[56.504658891526;-4.5297655978151 NN444376]	Hu,Sim
1178	2577	Scotland	1037	2039	Ptarmigan	778	33	2,552	108	01C	56	[56.189492857813;-4.6443722876854 NN360028]	Sim
1179	1783	Scotland	1038	1392	An t-Sail Mhor	778	62	2,552	203	16B	9	[58.391447691697;-4.8449793919893 NC338483]	Sim
1180	2402	Scotland	1039	1893	Stob Coire nan Easain	778	37	2,552	121	03B	41	[56.630079093995;-4.9931255200356 NN165527]	Sim
1181	2678	Scotland	1040	2124	Craggan a' Chait	778	31	2,552	102	15A	20	[57.850028904123;-4.8240334459251 NH325880]	Sim
1182	1012	England	55	71	Dow Crag	778	129	2,552	423	34D	96 97	[54.369443861656;-3.1374433838876 SD262977]	Hu,Sim,Hew,N,W,B,Sy,Fel
1183	1429	Scotland	1041	1099	Beinn a' Chruinnich	778	84	2,552	276	08B	36	[57.202301539129;-3.2645146473104 NJ237131]	Sim
1184	457	Scotland	1042	336	Mount Battock	778	286	2,552	938	07B	44	[56.948647086775;-2.7430037086143 NO549844]	Ma,C,Sim,CoH
1185	368	Scotland	1043	271	Meall na Leitreach	777	331	2,550	1,086	05A	42	[56.803383088879;-4.2288069177228 NN640702]	Ma,C,Sim
1186	496	Scotland	1044	366	Meall Horn	777	264	2,549	866	16B	9	[58.361477749977;-4.8186269672432 NC352449]	Ma,C,Sim
1187	1732	Scotland	1045	1349	Sgurr Airigh na Bheinne	777	65	2,549	213	10B	33	[57.050463730865;-5.424398001414 NG924007]	Sim
1188	2578	Scotland	1046	2040	Sgorr na Diollaid West Top	777	33	2,549	108	12B	25	[57.379770127404;-4.8742853803372 NH273358]	Sim
1189	1207	Scotland	1047	925	Meall an Lundain	777	104	2,549	341	08B	36 43	[57.034721434576;-3.5471870040057 NO062948]	Hu,Sim
1190	1833	Scotland	1048	1428	White Hill	777	59	2,548	194	07B	44	[56.844569665402;-2.9835630205838 NO401730]	Sim
1191	1512	Scotland	1049	1173	Carn Geal	776	78	2,547	256	06B	43	[56.748940023388;-3.6907759588688 NN967632]	Sim
1192	822	Scotland	1050	618	Glas Bheinn	776	159	2,546	522	16E	15	[58.192649055007;-4.9720165104841 NC254265]	Ma,C,Sim
1193	831	Scotland	1051	626	Quinag - Sail Gorm	776	158	2,546	518	16E	15	[58.225374835234;-5.0701501554912 NC198304]	Ma,C,Sim
1194	506	England	56	31	Red Screes	776	260	2,546	853	34C	90	[54.470055366547;-2.9334666474529 NY396087]	Ma,Sim,Hew,N,W,B,Sy,Fel
1195	201	Scotland	1052	142	Glamaig - Sgurr Mhairi	775	486	2,543	1,594	17B	32	[57.292657088763;-6.1294241846855 NG513300]	Ma,C,Sim
1196	721	Scotland	1053	542	Sgorr Craobh a' Chaorainn	775	187	2,543	614	18B	40	[56.824976047096;-5.4513207528141 NM895757]	Ma,C,Sim
1197	1268	Scotland	1054	971	Beinn Loinne	775	98	2,543	322	10A	34	[57.122921568083;-5.0559417146145 NH151077]	Sim,sHu
1198	2355	Scotland	1055	1853	Creag an Fhir-eoin	775	38	2,543	125	09B	34	[57.089260017294;-4.5958773002415 NH428028]	Sim
1199	699	Scotland	1056	527	Shalloch on Minnoch	774	194	2,540	635	27B	77	[55.183046590305;-4.5034325512614 NX407905]	Ma,C,Sim,D
1200	219	Scotland	1057	157	Meall a' Phubuill	774	468	2,539	1,535	10D	41	[56.917849980989;-5.2396529115876 NN029854]	Ma,C,Sim
1201	593	Scotland	1058	444	Beinn nan Caorach	774	227	2,539	745	10A	33	[57.150260923826;-5.5212869209073 NG871121]	Ma,C,Sim
1202	2203	Scotland	1059	1729	Ileach Bhan	774	43	2,539	141	09B	35	[57.162438236567;-4.2503750291559 NH640102]	Sim
1203	2498	Scotland	1060	1974	Creag a' Bhealaich	774	35	2,539	115	03C	50	[56.589400103497;-4.8889052364869 NN227479]	Sim
1204	2290	Scotland	1061	1801	Black Hill of Mark	774	40	2,539	131	07B	44	[56.918957866118;-3.1120026711566 NO324814]	Sim
1205	2403	Scotland	1062	1894	Scarsoch Bheag	774	37	2,539	121	06A	43	[56.945740292709;-3.7539285508098 NN934852]	Sim
1206	635	Scotland	1063	479	Beinn Spionnaidh	773	211	2,536	692	16B	9	[58.472151305214;-4.81205059477 NC361572]	Ma,C,Sim
1207	1513	Scotland	1064	1174	Beinn an Iomaire	773	78	2,536	256	11B	34	[57.201364447663;-5.0458649322679 NH161164]	Sim
1208	1514	Scotland	1065	1175	Beinn a' Chaorainn	773	78	2,536	256	18A	40	[56.835856803413;-5.5441695859283 NM839772]	Sim
1209	1625	Scotland	1066	1263	Sgurr a' Chaorachain North Top	773	71	2,536	233	13B	24	[57.41781301195;-5.6902546528607 NG785424]	Sim
1210	2082	Scotland	1067	1627	Meall a' Chuilinn	773	48	2,536	157	18B	40	[56.700150003563;-5.4464107925935 NM891618]	Sim
1211	2446	Scotland	1068	1929	Carn Choire Odhair	773	36	2,536	118	09B	35	[57.199665552124;-4.1251689948195 NH717141]	Sim
1212	1515	England	57	99	Grey Friar	773	78	2,536	256	34D	89 90	[54.392776580651;-3.1411691708709 NY260003]	Sim,Hew,N,W,B,Sy,Fel
1213	2637	England	58	182	Sail	773	32	2,536	105	34B	89 90	[54.570634404961;-3.2420386760937 NY198202]	Sim,Hew,N,W,B,Sy,Fel
1214	180	Ireland	47	37	Mullaghanattin	773	514	2,536	1,686	50B	78	[51.933136089064;-9.8355640697539 V738772]	Ma,Sim,Hew,Dil,A,VL
1215	2231	Scotland	1069	1750	Beinn Chuirn South Top	773	42	2,536	138	01D	50	[56.416176582339;-4.7995387075247 NN274284]	Sim
1216	2036	Scotland	1070	1591	Beinn Dubh	773	50	2,536	164	01D	50 56	[56.264524594491;-4.788446209564 NN274115]	Sim
1217	2522	Scotland	1071	1994	Mid Hill	773	35	2,536	114	07A	44	[56.823019458715;-3.279559077825 NO220709]	Sim
1218	59	Ireland	48	9	Barrclashcame	772	706	2,533	2,316	47A	37	[53.662746695977;-9.7419360775862 L849695]	Ma,Sim,Hew,Dil,A,VL
1219	2128	Scotland	1072	1668	Leachdann Feith Seasgachain South Top	772	46	2,533	151	06A	43	[56.904986621371;-3.7766504330446 NN919807]	Sim
1220	541	Scotland	1073	401	Meall Lighiche	772	247	2,533	810	03B	41	[56.628140777676;-5.108758093016 NN094528]	Ma,C,Sim
1221	1030	Scotland	1074	783	Meall a' Ghrianain	772	127	2,533	417	15B	20	[57.757307157512;-4.7495424090734 NH365775]	Hu,Sim
1222	1654	Scotland	1075	1284	Creagan Mor	772	69	2,533	226	05A	42	[56.89510201345;-4.2753184388304 NN615805]	Sim
1223	2736	England	59	189	Wandope	772	30	2,533	98	34B	89 90	[54.565982339808;-3.2573641490089 NY188197]	Sim,Hew,N,W,B,Sy,Fel
1224	214	Ireland	49	41	Coomacarrea	772	474	2,533	1,555	50A	78 83	[51.977715886211;-10.022233405288 V611825]	Ma,Sim,Hew,Dil,A,VL
1225	1850	Scotland	1076	1443	Carn Tiekeiver	772	58	2,533	190	08B	36	[57.103357329624;-3.3618444580389 NJ176022]	Sim
1226	2120	Scotland	1077	1660	Bac na Creige	771	47	2,530	153	06A	42	[56.892398578467;-4.0141031819875 NN774797]	Sim
1227	331	Scotland	1078	243	Beinn Stacach	771	363	2,530	1,191	01C	57	[56.314459309616;-4.4686567692429 NN474163]	Ma,C,Sim
1228	1709	Scotland	1079	1329	Stonefield Hill	771	66	2,530	217	01A	52	[56.444985393256;-3.894643542584 NN833297]	Sim
1229	136	Scotland	1080	92	Stob Coire a' Chearcaill	771	575	2,530	1,886	18B	41	[56.802493069009;-5.2509867724448 NN016726]	Ma,C,Sim
1230	1733	Scotland	1081	1350	Carn Glas Iochdarach	771	65	2,530	213	11B	25	[57.234554171983;-5.0486032474831 NH161201]	Sim
1231	2071	Wales	42	121	Drum	771	48	2,530	159	30B	115	[53.206818076341;-3.935947021976 SH708695]	Sim,Hew,N
1232	2356	Scotland	1082	1854	Carn Dearg North Top	770	38	2,526	125	06B	43	[56.839321777526;-3.58173689262 NO036731]	Sim
1233	508	Scotland	1083	372	Druim Tarsuinn	770	259	2,526	850	18B	40	[56.797120035953;-5.4831647303157 NM874727]	Ma,C,Sim
1234	2257	Scotland	1084	1771	Creag Coire na Feola	770	41	2,526	135	12A	25	[57.499136010104;-4.9971899264674 NH205494]	Sim
1235	308	Wales	43	18	Moelwyn Mawr	770	385	2,526	1,263	30B	124	[52.983685919732;-4.0004382416461 SH658448]	Ma,Sim,Hew,N
1236	1274	England	60	87	Hopegill Head	770	97	2,526	318	34B	89 90	[54.58749708197;-3.2626693995683 NY185221]	Sim,Hew,N,sHu,W,B,Sy,Fel
1237	786	Wales	44	52	Waun Rydd	769	170	2,524	558	32A	160	[51.876051905432;-3.363976502622 SO062206]	Ma,Sim,Hew,N
1238	156	Scotland	1085	108	Cul Beag	769	546	2,523	1,791	16F	15	[58.029257196018;-5.1515734865609 NC140088]	Ma,C,Sim
1239	579	Scotland	1086	432	Meallach Mhor	769	232	2,523	761	06A	35	[56.99210449841;-4.0161954223334 NN776908]	Ma,C,Sim
1240	1911	Scotland	1087	1489	Beinn Liath Mhor South Top	769	55	2,523	180	13B	25	[57.505672286912;-5.4118627941793 NG957513]	Sim
1241	355	Scotland	1088	260	Beinn a' Choin	769	345	2,522	1,132	01C	50 56	[56.280827392842;-4.6603714497404 NN354130]	Ma,C,Sim
1242	685	Scotland	1089	517	Carn Dearg	768	196	2,520	643	09B	34	[57.014995340918;-4.7076682338994 NN357948]	Ma,C,Sim
1243	2404	Scotland	1090	1895	Carn a' Chuilinn South Top	768	37	2,520	121	09B	34	[57.086087543828;-4.618764049052 NH414025]	Sim
1244	1764	Scotland	1091	1375	Sandy Hillock	768	63	2,520	207	07A	44	[56.909092778907;-3.2069588471819 NO266804]	Sim
1245	2484	Ireland	50	211	Knockmoylan	767	35	2,517	115	54A	74	[52.235891435901;-7.9172960934523 S057093]	Sim,Hew,Dil,A,VL
1246	382	Scotland	1092	283	Sail Mhor	767	322	2,516	1,056	14A	19	[57.844370375819;-5.3174368968089 NH032887]	Ma,C,Sim
1247	2258	Scotland	1093	1772	Carn Dubh	767	41	2,516	135	09B	35	[57.142084405063;-4.4722909932084 NH505084]	Sim
1248	1734	England	61	117	Meldon Hill	767	65	2,516	213	35A	91	[54.655568773231;-2.3564623388363 NY771290]	Sim,Hew,N
1249	728	Ireland	51	90	Slieve Commedagh	767	184	2,516	604	43B	29	[54.188728877649;-5.9387523867947 J346286]	Ma,Sim,Hew,Dil,A,VL
1250	1571	Scotland	1094	1221	Trilleachan Slabs	767	74	2,516	243	03B	50	[56.554622360071;-5.1010945901637 NN095446]	Sim
1251	465	Scotland	1095	342	Beinn Liath Mhor a' Ghiubhais Li	766	281	2,513	922	14B	20	[57.698510294003;-4.8877573787052 NH280713]	Ma,C,Sim
1252	599	Scotland	1096	450	Fuar Bheinn	766	226	2,513	741	18C	49	[56.649101468467;-5.5037621509313 NM853563]	Ma,C,Sim
1253	1019	Scotland	1097	773	Creag Mhor	766	128	2,513	420	09B	34	[57.040881490878;-4.5001800160175 NN484972]	Hu,Sim
1254	1430	Scotland	1098	1100	Sgurr na h-Ighinn	766	84	2,513	276	18B	40	[56.7465538048;-5.4588442471256 NM886670]	Sim
1255	1912	Scotland	1099	1490	Geal Charn	766	55	2,513	180	09B	35	[57.115759926864;-4.1451353538038 NH702048]	Sim
1256	2679	England	62	185	Great Rigg	766	31	2,513	102	34C	90	[54.484825636677;-2.9970899330063 NY355104]	Sim,Hew,N,W,B,Sy,Fel
1257	78	Scotland	1100	58	Dun da Ghaoithe	766	659	2,513	2,162	17E	49	[56.460270962603;-5.7802716673 NM672362]	Ma,C,Sim
1258	2432	Scotland	1101	1917	Mallrenheskein	765	36	2,510	118	07A	43	[56.839807674959;-3.3899610902291 NO153729]	Sim
1259	1710	Scotland	1102	1330	Meall na Caora	765	66	2,510	217	01B	57	[56.306885836459;-4.2531467024037 NN607150]	Sim
1260	473	Scotland	1103	348	Braigh nan Uamhachan	765	276	2,510	906	10D	40	[56.926283238067;-5.3291575057832 NM975866]	Ma,C,Sim
1261	2447	Scotland	1104	1930	Carn Fraoich	765	36	2,510	118	09B	35	[57.079063124775;-4.3855844411116 NH555012]	Sim
1262	2122	Scotland	1105	1662	Meallan Buidhe	764	46	2,508	152	12A	26	[57.461108100219;-4.7739433783624 NH337446]	Sim
1263	112	Scotland	1106	80	Ben Loyal - An Caisteal	764	609	2,507	1,998	16B	10	[58.404390762723;-4.4351699512274 NC578488]	Ma,C,Sim
1264	94	Ireland	52	17	Croagh Patrick	764	638	2,507	2,093	47A	30	[53.760041672282;-9.6610420384769 L905802]	Ma,Sim,Hew,Dil,A,VL
1265	703	Scotland	1107	529	Quinag - Spidean Coinich	764	192	2,507	630	16E	15	[58.201485784549;-5.0544678620914 NC206277]	Ma,C,Sim
1266	1110	Scotland	1108	850	Beinn na Caillich	764	115	2,507	377	04A	41	[56.718803576858;-5.0410432587498 NN140627]	Hu,Sim
1267	1497	Scotland	1109	1159	Sgurr nan Gillean	764	79	2,507	259	17D	39	[56.953801903547;-6.310718634393 NM380930]	Sim
1268	2638	Scotland	1110	2087	Sgurr Beag	764	32	2,507	105	17B	32	[57.242250493466;-6.185148775944 NG476246]	Sim
1269	315	Scotland	1111	234	Meall an Fhudair	764	382	2,507	1,253	01D	50 56	[56.333475160831;-4.7999483418197 NN270192]	Ma,C,Sim
1270	474	Scotland	1112	349	Cnoc Coinnich	764	276	2,505	906	19C	56	[56.166105639969;-4.8473556719372 NN233007]	Ma,C,Sim,xG
1271	2405	Ireland	53	208	Tievummera	763	37	2,503	121	47A	37	[53.661980285838;-9.7328272050114 L855694]	Sim,Hew
1272	536	Scotland	1113	396	Little Wyvis	763	249	2,503	817	15B	20	[57.642052031596;-4.6335628985037 NH429644]	Ma,C,Sim
1273	1184	Scotland	1114	905	Meall Mor	763	107	2,503	351	18B	40	[56.797666568687;-5.4635542991757 NM886727]	Hu,Sim
1274	1851	Scotland	1115	1444	Meall Caca	763	58	2,503	190	09B	34	[57.088479585099;-4.5017336371328 NH485025]	Sim
1275	2448	Scotland	1116	1931	Beinn Bhan South Top	763	36	2,503	118	13B	24	[57.432615229983;-5.6450729039044 NG813439]	Sim
1276	2737	Scotland	1117	2175	Carn Dearg North Top	763	30	2,503	98	09C	34 41	[56.969880000904;-4.7159105126751 NN350898]	Sim
1277	783	England	63	47	Stony Cove Pike	763	171	2,503	561	34C	90	[54.481982881207;-2.9013255705203 NY417100]	Ma,Sim,Hew,N,W,B,Sy,Fel
1278	904	England	64	61	Wetherlam	763	145	2,503	476	34D	89 90	[54.400364758871;-3.0982477923475 NY288011]	Hu,Sim,Hew,N,sMa,W,B,Sy,Fel
1279	1171	Ireland	54	123	Masatiompan	763	108	2,503	354	49A	70	[52.261237185351;-10.248970814191 Q465145]	Hu,Sim,Hew,Dil,A,VL
1280	2232	Wales	45	131	Gallt yr Ogof	763	42	2,503	138	30B	115	[53.107433939054;-3.9658406839745 SH685585]	Sim,Hew,N
1281	963	Scotland	1118	729	Meall na Spionaig	763	136	2,503	447	06B	43	[56.877194835456;-3.6407700670513 NO001774]	Hu,Sim
1282	486	Scotland	1119	358	Beinn na h-Uamha	762	269	2,501	883	18B	40	[56.742568115511;-5.4077616546104 NM917664]	Ma,C,Sim
1283	461	England	65	27	High Raise	762	283	2,500	928	34B	89 90	[54.47572857127;-3.1126124487278 NY280095]	Ma,Sim,Hew,N,W,B,Sy,Fel
1284	2129	Ireland	55	192	Shehy Mountain	762	46	2,500	151	50C	78	[52.012951687756;-9.6014033147562 V901857]	Sim,Hew,Dil,A,VL
1285	256	Scotland	1120	190	Beinn Talaidh	762	430	2,499	1,411	17E	49	[56.444481601964;-5.8550020826606 NM625347]	Ma,G,Sim,xC
1286	986	Scotland	1121	747	Meall an Tagraidh	761	133	2,497	436	10C	34	[57.001728813323;-4.9751647685269 NN194940]	Hu,Sim
1287	1198	Scotland	1122	917	Carn na Feola	761	105	2,497	344	13A	19	[57.592520448858;-5.4903112211154 NG915612]	Hu,Sim
1288	1248	Scotland	1123	953	Creag a' Chail	761	100	2,497	328	09B	34	[57.025583810335;-4.6326324562728 NN403958]	Hu,Sim
1289	1655	Scotland	1124	1285	Sail Rac	761	69	2,497	226	16B	16	[58.316065382154;-4.7996405920676 NC361398]	Sim
1290	2160	Scotland	1125	1691	Sgurr Ruadh	761	45	2,497	148	14A	19	[57.812440149242;-5.3010279992813 NH040851]	Sim
1291	2161	Scotland	1126	1692	Sron Liath	761	45	2,497	148	15A	20	[57.74435287162;-4.8477161651546 NH306763]	Sim
1292	2357	Scotland	1127	1855	A' Chioch	761	38	2,497	125	13B	24	[57.438745785565;-5.6506848475244 NG810446]	Sim
1293	652	Scotland	1128	491	Sgurr a' Chaorainn	761	205	2,495	673	18B	40	[56.739741875039;-5.4451305961289 NM894662]	Ma,G,Sim
1294	2204	Scotland	1129	1730	Wester Watery Knowe	761	43	2,495	141	07B	44	[56.8905746858;-3.0701240848357 NO349782]	Sim
1295	2218	Wales	46	130	Fan Hir	760	43	2,493	140	32A	160	[51.874359113071;-3.7009448203079 SN830209]	Sim,Hew,N
1296	2579	Scotland	1130	2041	Caisteal Abhail East Top	760	33	2,493	108	20C	62 69	[55.64987009588;-5.221508522103 NR974443]	Sim
1297	2580	Scotland	1131	2042	Druim a' Ghoirtein	760	33	2,493	108	10B	33 40	[57.008798634599;-5.4683473306437 NM895962]	Sim
1298	2612	Scotland	1132	2067	Meall Gharran	760	32	2,492	106	06B	43	[56.865874019467;-3.6812861592855 NN976762]	Sim
1299	602	Scotland	1133	452	Shee of Ardtalnaig	759	224	2,490	735	01A	51 52	[56.490778313492;-4.0658601102977 NN729351]	Ma,G,Sim
1300	512	Scotland	1134	375	Beinn a' Chapuill	759	258	2,490	846	10A	33	[57.172784778558;-5.5830140393153 NG835148]	Ma,G,Sim
1301	2205	Scotland	1135	1731	Sherramore Forest	759	43	2,490	141	09B	34	[57.070923733344;-4.4807529029689 NH497005]	Sim
1302	2259	Scotland	1136	1773	Leac a' Chaisteil	759	41	2,490	135	17D	39	[56.959006669356;-6.3162591966085 NM377936]	Sim
1303	1913	Ireland	56	180	Slievemaan	759	55	2,490	180	55A	56	[52.958659934209;-6.4873767105528 T017908]	Sim,Hew,Dil,A,VL
1304	641	Scotland	1137	485	Carn an Tionail	759	209	2,489	686	16B	16	[58.3100350058;-4.7462342070597 NC392390]	Ma,G,Sim
1305	2221	Scotland	1138	1741	Meall Gorm	758	42	2,487	139	07A	43	[56.855733944065;-3.4118711842878 NO140747]	Sim
1306	1412	Scotland	1139	1086	Creag Ghorm	758	86	2,487	282	03B	41	[56.670467201351;-5.2118401962365 NN033578]	Sim
1307	1547	Scotland	1140	1200	Arkle South Top	758	76	2,487	249	16B	9	[58.363466230981;-4.8906073220839 NC310453]	Sim
1308	1765	Scotland	1141	1376	Aonach Sgoilte West Top	758	63	2,487	207	10B	33	[57.059630969726;-5.5786927590343 NG831022]	Sim
1309	2639	Scotland	1142	2088	Bod a' Mhadail	758	32	2,487	105	16F	15	[58.062085817429;-5.1324221672077 NC153124]	Sim
1310	2680	Scotland	1143	2125	A' Ghlas-bheinn South Top	758	31	2,487	102	11A	25 33	[57.24446882359;-5.296469540546 NH012219]	Sim
1311	967	Ireland	57	109	Camenabologue	758	136	2,487	446	55A	56	[53.004356054139;-6.4768407654446 T023959]	Hu,Sim,Hew,Dil,A,VL
1312	1255	Scotland	1144	959	Meall a' Chall	758	99	2,486	326	02B	51	[56.527728804194;-4.5443134625543 NN436402]	Sim,sHu
1313	2162	Scotland	1145	1693	Sidhean Dubh na Cloiche Baine	757	45	2,484	148	09B	35	[57.08012644141;-4.4698156078552 NH504015]	Sim
1314	2358	Scotland	1146	1856	Druim Chosaidh	757	38	2,484	125	10B	33	[57.049251287851;-5.4358326809306 NG917006]	Sim
1315	2233	Scotland	1147	1751	Carrifran Gans	757	42	2,484	138	28B	79	[55.410883521105;-3.3298718199388 NT159138]	Sim,DT
1316	1047	England	66	73	Ill Bell	757	124	2,484	407	34C	90	[54.461530442023;-2.871564798143 NY436077]	Hu,Sim,Hew,N,W,B,Sy,Fel
1317	2449	Ireland	58	209	Purple Mountain NE Top	757	36	2,484	118	50C	78	[52.013711064679;-9.6116266368252 V894858]	Sim,Hew,Dil,A,VL
1318	497	Ireland	59	70	Kippure	757	264	2,484	866	55B	56	[53.177662688414;-6.3330976525361 O115154]	Ma,Sim,Hew,Dil,A,VL,CoH,CoU
1319	429	Scotland	1148	318	Beinn Shiantaidh	757	303	2,484	994	20A	61	[55.900965237561;-5.9801138177978 NR513747]	Ma,G,Sim
1320	1963	Scotland	1149	1530	Mainnir nam Fiadh	757	53	2,484	174	17E	49	[56.452400222719;-5.7729940094419 NM676353]	Sim
1321	2427	Wales	47	138	Drosgl	757	37	2,483	120	30B	115	[53.191331238278;-4.0026100657712 SH663679]	Sim,Hew,N
1322	2711	Scotland	1150	2154	Meallanan Odhar	757	31	2,482	101	02A	42 51	[56.650996578477;-4.1561821932054 NN679531]	Sim
1323	2180	Scotland	1151	1708	Ben Killilan	757	44	2,482	144	12B	25	[57.330228385545;-5.3506906790333 NG984316]	Sim
1324	2450	Scotland	1152	1932	An Sgarsoch Far East Top	757	36	2,482	118	06A	43	[56.945456819178;-3.7095272591301 NN961851]	Sim
1325	301	Scotland	1153	223	Creag Dhubh	756	391	2,480	1,283	09B	35	[57.046825191771;-4.1823742311559 NN677972]	Ma,G,Sim
1326	934	Scotland	1154	706	Sgorr an Tarmachain	756	141	2,480	463	18B	40	[56.783852115842;-5.5392585167868 NM839714]	Hu,Sim,sMa
1327	1819	Scotland	1155	1417	An Leth-chreag	756	60	2,480	197	12A	26	[57.465119889719;-4.8359558653348 NH300452]	Sim
1328	142	Wales	48	10	Y Llethr	756	561	2,480	1,841	30D	124	[52.812168885669;-3.9880999559006 SH661257]	Ma,Sim,Hew,N
1329	1852	Scotland	1156	1445	Hill of Gairney	756	58	2,480	190	07B	44	[56.975383080484;-2.9113346221647 NO447875]	Sim
1330	1060	Scotland	1157	810	Finbracks	756	122	2,480	400	07B	44	[56.820317888912;-2.9829272929441 NO401703]	Hu,Sim
1331	1357	Scotland	1158	1044	Black Hill	756	90	2,479	296	07A	43	[56.830110095363;-3.3732134280522 NO163718]	Sim,sHu
1332	1982	Scotland	1159	1547	Biorach a' Mheannain	755	52	2,477	171	01A	51 52	[56.462576307962;-3.9766767081775 NN783318]	Sim
1333	637	Scotland	1160	481	Cook's Cairn	755	210	2,477	689	21A	37	[57.335359451649;-3.161104679571 NJ302278]	Ma,G,Sim,xC
1334	1983	Scotland	1161	1548	Sgurr a' Chuilinn	755	52	2,477	171	10A	33	[57.154376023214;-5.3380654371571 NG982120]	Sim
1335	2181	Scotland	1162	1709	Meall nan Creag Leac	755	44	2,477	144	18B	40	[56.813561185586;-5.5060005245648 NM861746]	Sim
1336	2451	Scotland	1163	1933	Mam na Gualainn East Top	755	36	2,477	118	04A	41	[56.717185812131;-5.0703363082429 NN122626]	Sim
1337	2291	England	67	153	Red Pike (Buttermere)	755	40	2,477	131	34B	89	[54.526891192424;-3.2994284418246 NY160154]	Sim,Hew,N,W,B,Sy,Fel
1338	453	Ireland	60	67	Knockanaffrin	755	289	2,477	948	54A	75	[52.2882045813;-7.5830751664192 S285152]	Ma,Sim,Hew,Dil,A,VL
1339	1264	Scotland	1164	967	Meall a' Gheur-fheadain	754	99	2,474	323	12A	25	[57.428769344202;-4.8931239331743 NH264413]	Sim,sHu
1340	1291	Scotland	1165	990	Meall Garbh	754	95	2,474	312	16B	9	[58.32084868192;-4.786355441579 NC369403]	Sim,sHu
1341	1421	Scotland	1166	1093	Black Hill	754	85	2,474	279	07B	44	[56.92774766813;-3.1336237675984 NO311824]	Sim
1342	589	Scotland	1167	440	The Stob	754	229	2,472	751	01C	51	[56.37604052003;-4.4451054111189 NN491231]	Ma,G,Sim
1343	1616	Scotland	1168	1254	Carn an Daimh	753	72	2,471	236	07A	43	[56.824208564368;-3.4188775772407 NO135712]	Sim
1344	2083	Scotland	1169	1628	A' Chioch East Top	753	48	2,470	157	13B	24	[57.439738597916;-5.6474494207274 NG812447]	Sim
1345	292	England	68	14	Dale Head	753	397	2,470	1,302	34B	89 90	[54.526984029977;-3.2036278150183 NY222153]	Ma,Sim,Hew,N,W,B,Sy,Fel
1346	2163	Scotland	1170	1694	Ben Killilan West Top	753	45	2,470	148	12B	25	[57.330682020692;-5.367352528413 NG974317]	Sim
1347	2452	Scotland	1171	1934	Beinn Loinne East Top	752	36	2,467	118	10A	34	[57.127847915448;-5.0381678970261 NH162082]	Sim
1348	805	Ireland	61	98	Beann	752	166	2,467	545	50B	78	[51.925654053292;-9.8541581035934 V725764]	Ma,Sim,Hew,Dil,A,VL
1349	167	Wales	49	11	Pumlumon Fawr	752	526	2,467	1,726	31A	135	[52.466567569026;-3.7840477338231 SN789869]	Ma,Sim,Hew,N,CoH,CoU
1350	2581	Scotland	1172	2043	Sgurr na Cloiche	752	33	2,467	108	12B	25	[57.32916130989;-5.3904812047195 NG960316]	Sim
1351	1103	Scotland	1173	843	Diollaid Mhor	751	116	2,464	381	18A	40	[56.854082717214;-5.5984057432165 NM807794]	Hu,Sim
1352	650	Wales	50	40	Moel Llyfnant	751	206	2,464	676	30D	124 125	[52.900081228284;-3.7735596908946 SH808351]	Ma,Sim,Hew,N
1353	69	Ireland	62	11	Errigal	751	685	2,464	2,247	45B	01	[55.033659985996;-8.1133528745326 B928207]	Ma,Sim,Hew,Dil,A,VL,CoH,CoU
1354	888	Wales	51	57	Diffwys	750	148	2,462	484	30D	124	[52.791505567768;-3.9871573334184 SH661234]	Hu,Sim,Hew,N,sMa
1355	655	Scotland	1174	493	Meallan a' Chuail	750	204	2,461	669	16E	15	[58.220340265911;-4.8210470533776 NC344292]	Ma,G,Sim
1356	1391	Scotland	1175	1072	Carn Dubh Ic an Deoir	750	88	2,461	289	09B	35	[57.252396663521;-4.0337109218852 NH774198]	Sim
1357	1690	Scotland	1176	1313	Cnapan nan Clach	750	67	2,461	220	06A	43	[56.931512644432;-3.6776651405556 NN980835]	Sim
1358	2220	Scotland	1177	1740	A' Ghlaise	750	43	2,459	140	16B	16	[58.2991965065;-4.748807612002 NC390378]	Sim
1359	1313	Wales	52	74	Bannau Sir Gaer - Picws Du	749	93	2,458	306	32A	160	[51.882045038841;-3.728841031355 SN811218]	Sim,Hew,N,sHu
1360	1572	Scotland	1178	1222	Meall Dhuin Croisg	749	74	2,457	243	02B	51	[56.502598001917;-4.3606213297424 NN548370]	Sim
1361	420	Scotland	1179	312	Groban	749	306	2,457	1,004	14B	19	[57.686739499159;-5.190560908832 NH099708]	Ma,G,Sim
1362	472	Scotland	1180	347	Sgurr Choinnich	749	277	2,457	909	10C	34	[57.007133317647;-5.0859692002822 NN127949]	Ma,G,Sim
1363	1480	Scotland	1181	1145	Sgurr an Fhuarain Duibh	749	80	2,457	262	10D	40	[56.915770249532;-5.4514871088628 NM900858]	Sim
1364	2359	Scotland	1182	1857	Carn Coire na h-Inghinn	749	38	2,457	125	09B	35	[57.111776274409;-4.1151776534669 NH720043]	Sim
1365	691	Scotland	1183	521	Mona Gowan	749	194	2,457	636	21A	37	[57.138266647234;-3.1003967774198 NJ335058]	Ma,G,Sim
1366	1066	Scotland	1184	814	Meikle Millyea	749	121	2,456	397	27B	77	[55.11461154524;-4.3282173303037 NX516825]	Hu,Sim,D
1367	345	Scotland	1185	253	Culter Fell	748	350	2,454	1,148	28B	72	[55.545461378108;-3.5040043327851 NT052290]	Ma,G,Sim,D,CoH,CoU
1368	2182	Scotland	1186	1710	Meall Odhar Loch Monaidh	748	44	2,454	144	05A	42	[56.785901570167;-4.348924935118 NN566685]	Sim
1369	2260	Scotland	1187	1774	Carn Fiaclach	748	41	2,454	135	05A	42	[56.731250148538;-4.1918379742837 NN660621]	Sim
1370	1067	Scotland	1188	815	Meall a' Bhuiridh	748	121	2,454	397	03B	41	[56.609655839343;-5.0567074329588 NN125506]	Hu,Sim
1371	2738	Scotland	1189	2176	Meall Dubh	748	30	2,454	98	14A	19	[57.721842559131;-5.1886129690799 NH102747]	Sim
1372	1587	England	69	105	Little Fell	748	73	2,454	240	35A	91	[54.594500488425;-2.3419994693468 NY780222]	Sim,Hew,N
1373	2541	Ireland	63	215	Piaras Mor	748	34	2,454	112	49A	70	[52.253099647362;-10.25148826223 Q463136]	Sim,Hew,A,VL
1374	300	Scotland	1190	222	Binnein Shuas	747	391	2,451	1,284	04B	34 42	[56.909125393245;-4.5275021169421 NN462826]	Ma,G,Sim
1375	570	Wales	53	37	Yr Aran	747	235	2,451	771	30B	115	[53.042493078622;-4.0837162609063 SH604515]	Ma,Sim,Hew,N
1376	502	Scotland	1191	369	Meall Mor	747	262	2,451	860	01C	50 56	[56.300671824112;-4.6148706777479 NN383151]	Ma,G,Sim
1377	994	Scotland	1192	754	Cross Craigs	747	132	2,451	433	02A	42 51	[56.63959109515;-4.3871158314947 NN537523]	Hu,Sim
1378	1275	Scotland	1193	977	Meall a' Phubuill East Top	747	97	2,451	318	10D	41	[56.917462011837;-5.219897021189 NN041853]	Sim,sHu
1379	1573	Scotland	1194	1223	Sgurr nam Meirleach	747	74	2,451	243	10D	33 40	[56.978682961749;-5.5165823021324 NM864930]	Sim
1380	707	England	70	43	Burnhope Seat	747	190	2,451	623	35A	91	[54.732011295426;-2.3369458115116 NY784375]	Ma,Sim,Hew,N
1381	2197	Ireland	64	199	Cnoc Iochtair	746	44	2,448	144	50C	78	[52.012309728056;-9.7717991343162 V784859]	Sim,Hew,Dil,A,VL
1382	1914	Scotland	1195	1491	Carn na Larach	746	55	2,448	180	09B	34	[57.029424694211;-4.7466258547942 NN334965]	Sim
1383	2739	England	71	190	Carl Side	746	30	2,448	98	34A	89 90	[54.641574775228;-3.1574259063323 NY254280]	Sim,Hew,N,W,B,Sy,Fel
1384	349	Ireland	65	54	Slieve Binnian	746	349	2,447	1,145	43B	29	[54.141819461155;-5.980874658171 J320233]	Ma,Sim,Hew,Dil,A,VL
1385	571	Scotland	1196	425	Meall a' Mhuic	745	235	2,444	771	02A	42 51	[56.627420486344;-4.3178706810994 NN579508]	Ma,G,Sim
1386	1140	Scotland	1197	872	A' Chir	745	111	2,444	364	20C	62 69	[55.629799948864;-5.2325729429733 NR966421]	Hu,Sim
1387	922	Scotland	1198	698	Cnoc Fraing	745	142	2,444	466	09B	35	[57.203867172519;-3.9780621941682 NH806143]	Hu,Sim,sMa
1388	947	Scotland	1199	716	An Socach	745	138	2,444	453	15A	20	[57.841217440198;-4.7340307299628 NH378868]	Hu,Sim
1389	2234	Scotland	1200	1752	Sail Gharbh West Top	745	42	2,444	138	16E	15	[58.212003669096;-5.0655891311302 NC200289]	Sim
1390	2292	Scotland	1201	1802	Creag a' Bhaca	745	40	2,444	131	11A	25	[57.320703814504;-4.9793159300603 NH207295]	Sim
1391	2453	Scotland	1202	1935	Meall na h-Uinneig	745	36	2,444	118	09B	35	[57.040904427336;-4.2627991471749 NN628967]	Sim
1392	1020	Scotland	1203	774	Under Saddle Yoke	745	128	2,444	420	28B	78	[55.399809021023;-3.3563448153981 NT142126]	Hu,Sim,D
1393	2406	England	72	165	Black Sails	745	37	2,444	121	34D	89 90	[54.396686200119;-3.1073912447824 NY282007]	Sim,Hew,N,B,Sy
1394	437	Ireland	66	64	Broaghnabinnia	745	299	2,444	981	50B	78	[51.972256395357;-9.7454790184491 V801814]	Ma,Sim,Hew,Dil,A,VL
1395	968	Scotland	1204	733	Carn a' Bhacain	745	136	2,444	446	08B	37	[57.12413611958;-3.172653906209 NJ291043]	Hu,Sim
1396	2324	Scotland	1205	1825	Buachaille Breige	745	39	2,444	128	06B	43	[56.94948100187;-3.6094182538827 NO022854]	Sim
1397	2343	Scotland	1206	1841	Beinn Bheag	745	38	2,443	126	16B	10	[58.398941853406;-4.4382169430159 NC576482]	Sim
1398	550	Scotland	1207	410	Dun Rig	744	243	2,441	797	28B	73	[55.571415659018;-3.1862109713316 NT253315]	Ma,G,Sim,D
1399	177	Scotland	1208	122	Druim Fada	744	516	2,441	1,693	10D	41	[56.893330463981;-5.1439095364357 NN086824]	Ma,G,Sim
1400	2360	Scotland	1209	1858	Carn Ghriogair North Top	744	38	2,441	125	09B	26 35	[57.265559651975;-4.2118853570629 NH667216]	Sim
1401	2499	England	73	172	High Crag (Buttermere)	744	35	2,441	115	34B	89 90	[54.513742261279;-3.268116411946 NY180139]	Sim,Hew,N,W,B,Sy,Fel
1402	492	Scotland	1210	363	Meall nan Gabhar	744	265	2,441	869	01D	50	[56.375254012048;-4.859708159577 NN235240]	Ma,G,Sim
1403	1626	Scotland	1211	1264	Beinn nan Aighenan East Top	744	71	2,441	233	03C	50	[56.522380805877;-4.9862479212021 NN164407]	Sim
1404	288	Scotland	1212	215	Mount Blair	744	400	2,441	1,312	07A	43	[56.750251366809;-3.3637561480581 NO167629]	Ma,G,Sim
1405	2500	Scotland	1213	1975	Meall na Moine	743	35	2,438	115	05A	42	[56.739452498922;-4.1334500462628 NN696629]	Sim
1406	948	Scotland	1214	717	Mulla bho Dheas	743	138	2,438	453	24B	13 14	[57.965626440492;-6.8328438804997 NB143076]	Hu,Sim
1407	81	Scotland	1215	61	Ben Mor Coigach	743	655	2,438	2,149	16F	15	[57.986012897119;-5.2273054396961 NC093042]	Ma,G,Sim
1408	521	Scotland	1216	383	Beinn nan Eun	743	255	2,438	837	15B	20	[57.745899222271;-4.6091825207656 NH448759]	Ma,G,Sim
1409	716	Scotland	1217	537	Creag Liath	743	188	2,438	617	09B	35	[57.077838785741;-4.2072964065752 NH663007]	Ma,G,Sim
1410	1330	Scotland	1218	1022	Meall Innis na Sine	743	92	2,438	302	12A	25	[57.487695397736;-5.0246239729911 NH188482]	Sim,sHu
1411	1344	Scotland	1219	1034	Stac na h-Iolaire	743	91	2,438	299	08A	36	[57.159474748816;-3.6284525287284 NJ016088]	Sim,sHu
1412	2261	Scotland	1220	1775	Mullach Tarsuinn	743	41	2,438	135	12B	25	[57.361267844359;-4.9360365912569 NH235339]	Sim
1413	407	Scotland	1221	300	Geallaig Hill	743	312	2,438	1,024	08B	37 44	[57.068544742182;-3.1610039636182 NO297981]	Ma,G,Sim
1414	1481	Scotland	1222	1146	Cairnagour Hill	743	80	2,438	262	21A	37	[57.136324353056;-3.1168618488173 NJ325056]	Sim
1415	2407	Scotland	1223	1896	Millstone Cairn	743	37	2,438	121	07A	43	[56.983789527129;-3.3689940087331 NO169889]	Sim
1416	2280	Scotland	1224	1791	Meall nan Tighearn	743	40	2,436	133	01D	50	[56.369982112402;-4.8544541460203 NN238234]	Sim
1417	2542	Ireland	67	216	Tievnabinnia	742	34	2,434	112	47A	37	[53.673319415586;-9.6939472533368 L881706]	Sim,Hew,Dil,A,VL
1418	1345	Scotland	1225	1035	Ben Our	742	91	2,434	299	01B	51 57	[56.359188682006;-4.2432813427559 NN615208]	Sim,sHu
1419	1748	Scotland	1226	1362	Stob Chalum Mhic Griogair	742	64	2,434	210	01B	57	[56.34342730411;-4.1695376413914 NN660189]	Sim
1420	1346	Scotland	1227	1036	Big Garvoun	742	91	2,434	299	08B	36	[57.158524727356;-3.4101653633587 NJ148084]	Sim,sHu
1421	546	Scotland	1228	406	Cnap Cruinn	742	245	2,434	804	04A	41	[56.85688071205;-4.7864588925095 NN302774]	Ma,G,Sim
1422	840	Scotland	1229	633	Pap of Glencoe	742	156	2,434	512	03A	41	[56.688599855385;-5.0631069638066 NN125594]	Ma,G,Sim
1423	1123	Scotland	1230	862	Carn Eilrig	742	113	2,434	371	08A	36	[57.126309571729;-3.7558515670653 NH938053]	Hu,Sim
1424	1599	Scotland	1231	1241	Creag Mhigeachaidh	742	72	2,434	236	08A	35 36	[57.09782590705;-3.8618042099933 NH873023]	Sim
1425	1711	Scotland	1232	1331	Geal-charn Beag	742	66	2,434	217	09B	35	[57.20491763827;-3.9102387499231 NH847143]	Sim
1426	2681	Scotland	1233	2126	Tom Ban Mor	742	31	2,434	102	15A	20	[57.734898364212;-4.8284900502261 NH317752]	Sim
1427	2055	Scotland	1234	1608	Little Geal Charn	742	49	2,434	161	21A	37	[57.26165436391;-3.1654158452776 NJ298196]	Sim
1428	1021	Scotland	1235	775	Hill of Cat	742	128	2,434	420	07B	44	[56.972218750095;-2.8503940824677 NO484871]	Hu,Sim
1429	1673	Ireland	68	165	Coumfea	742	68	2,434	223	54A	75	[52.238726773227;-7.5689011168138 S295097]	Sim,Hew,Dil,A,VL
1430	1378	Scotland	1236	1061	Meall nam Maigheach	741	89	2,431	292	02A	51	[56.615047861885;-4.3545986415713 NN556495]	Sim
1431	2361	Scotland	1237	1859	Creag Ard	741	38	2,431	125	02A	51	[56.610129656789;-4.2809591837994 NN601488]	Sim
1432	1095	Scotland	1238	835	Beinn Uidhe	741	117	2,431	384	16E	15	[58.181151704501;-4.9251202352825 NC281251]	Hu,Sim
1433	1749	Wales	54	100	Pen Pumlumon Arwystli	741	64	2,431	210	31A	135 136	[52.474305428199;-3.7475507910454 SN814877]	Sim,Hew,N
1434	61	Scotland	1239	47	Beinn Mhor	741	696	2,431	2,283	19C	56	[56.072447306789;-5.042941412437 NS107908]	Ma,G,Sim
1435	543	Scotland	1240	403	Sgurr Dearg	741	246	2,431	807	17E	49	[56.439306822802;-5.7895497365536 NM665339]	Ma,G,Sim
1436	1276	Scotland	1241	978	Cruys	741	97	2,431	318	07B	44	[56.868177327135;-2.9513748664613 NO421756]	Sim,sHu
1437	1964	Scotland	1242	1531	Sgor Dubh	741	53	2,431	174	08A	43	[57.008978896305;-3.5938734216427 NO033920]	Sim
1438	1239	Scotland	1243	948	Meall a' Choire Dhuibh	740	101	2,428	331	10B	33 40	[57.025040336699;-5.4335961831746 NM917979]	Hu,Sim
1439	2001	Scotland	1244	1563	Carn Coire na h-Eirghe	740	51	2,428	167	09B	35	[57.243803917153;-4.064727897093 NH755189]	Sim
1440	853	Scotland	1245	643	Badandun Hill	740	154	2,428	505	07A	44	[56.794957656264;-3.2998875358866 NO207678]	Ma,G,Sim
1441	1674	Scotland	1246	1300	Beinn Domhnuill	739	68	2,425	223	01B	57	[56.351051400974;-4.1958666004746 NN644198]	Sim
1442	346	Scotland	1247	254	Stob na Cruaiche	739	350	2,425	1,148	03A	41	[56.67690500042;-4.6735517205298 NN363571]	Ma,G,Sim
1443	1431	Scotland	1248	1101	An Torc	739	84	2,425	276	05A	42	[56.857580108537;-4.2631968749954 NN621763]	Sim
1444	54	Scotland	1249	43	Sgurr na Coinnich	739	714	2,425	2,343	17C	33	[57.235617546548;-5.7101459861511 NG762222]	Ma,G,Sim
1445	139	Scotland	1250	95	Beinn Mheadhoin	739	568	2,425	1,864	18C	49	[56.602659716062;-5.5874770503796 NM799514]	Ma,G,Sim
1446	1482	Scotland	1251	1147	Sgurr Dubh	739	80	2,425	262	10B	33	[57.095121185297;-5.4020947027235 NG940056]	Sim
1447	2002	Scotland	1252	1564	Sron na h-Iolaire	739	51	2,425	167	06A	43	[56.98278122711;-3.9235301505529 NN832896]	Sim
1448	2262	Scotland	1253	1776	Slioch South Top	739	41	2,425	135	14A	19	[57.655990195311;-5.337098893697 NH010678]	Sim
1449	2408	Scotland	1254	1897	An Sguman	739	37	2,425	121	14B	19	[57.672226603943;-5.123861040997 NH138690]	Sim
1450	2682	Scotland	1255	2127	Carn Maire	739	31	2,425	102	15B	20	[57.818153350927;-4.5470453621557 NH488838]	Sim
1451	2409	England	74	166	Hobcarton Crag	739	37	2,425	121	34B	89 90	[54.586727131516;-3.2502657343046 NY193220]	Sim,Hew,N,B,Sy
1452	425	Ireland	69	61	Slieve Bearnagh	739	304	2,425	997	43B	29	[54.184196268506;-5.9895330999603 J313280]	Ma,Sim,Hew,Dil,A,VL
1453	501	Scotland	1256	368	Meall Mor	738	263	2,421	863	15B	20	[57.735603392623;-4.4958745958076 NH515745]	Ma,G,Sim
1454	1600	Scotland	1257	1242	Cairn Dulnan	738	72	2,421	236	09B	35	[57.170110186448;-4.0655782430939 NH752107]	Sim
1455	1834	Scotland	1258	1429	Sgurr Dubh	738	59	2,421	194	14A	19	[57.652579890166;-5.3300784879072 NH014674]	Sim
1456	1835	Scotland	1259	1430	Speicein nan Garbh-choireachan	738	59	2,421	194	16F	15	[57.980374737498;-5.2369498814626 NC087036]	Sim
1457	2108	Scotland	1260	1649	Glac Raineach	738	47	2,421	154	10A	33	[57.087032969975;-5.1619490865171 NH085040]	Sim
1458	1362	Scotland	1261	1049	Milldown	738	90	2,421	295	27B	77	[55.127031449041;-4.3367834886202 NX511839]	Sim,D,sHu
1459	2582	Scotland	1262	2044	Meall Mor East Top	737	33	2,418	108	01C	50 56	[56.299047095831;-4.6066772025474 NN388149]	Sim
1460	987	Scotland	1263	748	Pykestone Hill	737	133	2,418	436	28B	72	[55.567427461586;-3.3129558625755 NT173312]	Hu,Sim,D
1461	1836	Scotland	1264	1431	Beinn Bheag	737	59	2,418	194	06B	43	[56.81229179719;-3.7231153993152 NN949703]	Sim
1462	2206	Scotland	1265	1732	Garrow Hill	737	43	2,418	141	01A	52	[56.516266528324;-3.9339593814917 NN811377]	Sim
1463	1013	Scotland	1266	767	Carn Ban	737	129	2,418	423	12A	26	[57.435949734845;-4.773704384711 NH336418]	Hu,Sim
1464	1784	Scotland	1267	1393	Beinn Liath Bheag	737	62	2,418	203	13B	25	[57.519480032225;-5.3663747264633 NG985527]	Sim
1465	813	England	75	49	Robinson	737	161	2,418	528	34B	89 90	[54.540133894541;-3.2364748056722 NY201168]	Ma,Sim,Hew,N,W,B,Sy,Fel
1466	864	England	76	54	Seat Sandal	737	152	2,417	498	34C	90	[54.494568441285;-3.0143106029558 NY344115]	Ma,Sim,Hew,N,W,B,Sy,Fel
1467	1290	Scotland	1268	989	Creag an Loch	737	96	2,416	314	02A	52	[56.66651401719;-3.922068874803 NN823544]	Sim,sHu
1468	1528	Scotland	1269	1185	Monadh nan Eun	736	77	2,415	253	08B	36	[57.15507023231;-3.4761617204308 NJ108081]	Sim
1469	275	Scotland	1270	205	Marsco	736	413	2,415	1,355	17B	32	[57.248428992119;-6.1344220775536 NG507251]	Ma,G,Sim
1470	423	Scotland	1271	314	Beinn na h-Eaglaise	736	305	2,415	1,001	13B	25	[57.51240217107;-5.4943408449705 NG908523]	Ma,G,Sim
1471	672	Scotland	1272	505	Beinn Bheag	736	200	2,415	656	18B	40	[56.716427771693;-5.4102993043487 NM914635]	Ma,G,Sim
1472	1277	Scotland	1273	979	Sgurr na h-Uamha	736	97	2,415	318	17B	32	[57.236875148409;-6.1845387132178 NG476240]	Sim,sHu
1473	1898	Scotland	1274	1478	Carn Loch Sruban Mora	736	56	2,415	184	15A	20	[57.820199251636;-4.8318039881783 NH319847]	Sim
1474	2130	Scotland	1275	1669	Carn Dearg	736	46	2,415	151	09B	34	[57.052416694962;-4.5075518893962 NN480985]	Sim
1475	2362	Scotland	1276	1860	Carn a' Ghorm-locha	736	38	2,415	125	12A	26	[57.473072550839;-4.7198026368892 NH370458]	Sim
1476	277	England	77	13	Whernside	736	408	2,415	1,339	35B	98	[54.227637483898;-2.403381881553 SD738814]	Ma,Sim,Hew,N,CoH,CoU,CoA
1477	1965	England	78	133	Harrison Stickle	736	53	2,415	174	34B	89 90	[54.456873722188;-3.1105583280821 NY281074]	Sim,Hew,N,W,B,Sy,Fel
1478	1887	Scotland	1277	1468	Stob Caol	736	57	2,414	186	01C	51	[56.366230747855;-4.4412384302477 NN493220]	Sim
1479	2721	Scotland	1278	2163	Saddle Yoke	736	30	2,413	99	28B	78	[55.397149085803;-3.3530956862962 NT144123]	Sim,DT
1480	1516	Scotland	1279	1176	Ruragh	735	78	2,412	256	07B	44	[56.82775741485;-2.9503495981598 NO421711]	Sim
1481	1656	Scotland	1280	1286	Stuc a' Chroin West Top	735	69	2,411	226	01B	57	[56.32385430505;-4.2589987339833 NN604169]	Sim
1482	1785	Ireland	70	170	Tomies Mountain	735	62	2,411	203	50C	78	[52.021796177378;-9.6119171961468 V894867]	Sim,Hew,Dil,A,VL
1483	159	Ireland	71	33	Blackstairs Mountain	735	540	2,411	1,772	54B	68	[52.548022624193;-6.8066981429275 S810447]	Ma,Sim,Hew,Dil,A,VL
1484	205	Scotland	1281	146	Druim na Sgriodain	735	482	2,410	1,581	18B	40	[56.738077641957;-5.3075738882807 NM978656]	Ma,G,Sim
1485	2705	Scotland	1282	2148	Sgorr Dhonuill Far West Top	734	31	2,409	101	03B	41	[56.658427510944;-5.225505052296 NN024565]	Sim
1486	445	Wales	55	26	Fan Fawr	734	295	2,408	968	32A	160	[51.862724195535;-3.4986352327723 SN969193]	Ma,Sim,Hew,N
1487	2037	Scotland	1283	1592	Carn na Saobhaidhe East Top	734	50	2,408	164	09B	35	[57.192956723621;-4.2522316595495 NH640136]	Sim
1488	2410	Scotland	1284	1898	Creag Ruadh	734	37	2,408	121	12A	25	[57.542263256988;-4.8820630050534 NH276539]	Sim
1489	2683	Scotland	1285	2128	Carn Odhar	734	31	2,408	102	08A	36	[57.115742101602;-3.7404875144673 NH947041]	Sim
1490	291	Wales	56	16	Craig Cwm Silyn	734	398	2,408	1,306	30B	115	[53.028694089966;-4.200864686754 SH525502]	Ma,Sim,Hew,N
1491	412	Wales	57	25	Rhobell Fawr	734	309	2,408	1,014	30D	124	[52.814231745141;-3.8027070202198 SH786256]	Ma,Sim,Hew,N
1492	2293	England	79	154	Long Side	734	40	2,408	131	34A	89 90	[54.645079499746;-3.16682358019 NY248284]	Sim,Hew,N,W,B,Sy,Fel
1493	1172	Ireland	72	124	Conavalla	734	108	2,408	354	55A	56	[53.015725259997;-6.452598295274 T039972]	Hu,Sim,Hew,Dil,A,VL
1494	63	Scotland	1286	49	Doune Hill	734	695	2,408	2,280	01E	56	[56.134980977481;-4.7533011105775 NS290970]	Ma,G,Sim
1495	2454	Scotland	1287	1936	An Eilrig	733	36	2,406	118	06A	43	[56.950260544105;-3.8758147063557 NN860859]	Sim
1496	1017	Scotland	1288	771	Sron na Ban-righ	733	129	2,406	422	06A	43	[56.97040510195;-3.8505051360634 NN876881]	Hu,Sim
1497	1483	Scotland	1289	1148	Troisgeach	733	80	2,405	262	01D	50 56	[56.335996287238;-4.7677703069246 NN290194]	Sim
1498	2411	Scotland	1290	1899	Sgurr Dubh Beag	733	37	2,405	121	17B	32	[57.204015966353;-6.1990411238041 NG465204]	Sim
1499	336	Scotland	1291	245	Beinn a' Chaolais	733	359	2,405	1,178	20A	60 61	[55.888016119548;-6.0187905973653 NR488734]	Ma,G,Sim
1500	1675	Scotland	1292	1301	Meall an t-Slugain	733	68	2,405	223	08B	36 43	[57.044941033411;-3.4437681128028 NO125958]	Sim

== DoBIH codes ==
The DoBIH uses the following codes for the various classifications of mountains and hills in the British Isles, which many of the above peaks also fall into:

- Ma Marilyn
- Hu HuMP
- Sim Simm
- 5 Dodd
- M Munro
- MT Munro Top
- F Furth
- C Corbett
- G Graham
- D Donald
- DT Donald Top
- Hew Hewitt
- N Nuttall
- Dew Dewey
- DDew Donald Dewey
- HF Highland Five
- 4 400-499m Tump
- 3 300-399m Tump (GB)
- 2 200-299m Tump (GB)
- 1 100-199m Tump (GB)
- 0 0-99m Tump (GB)
- W Wainwright
- WO Wainwright Outlying Fell
- B Birkett
- Sy Synge
- Fel Fellranger
- CoH County Top – Historic (pre-1974)
- CoA County Top – Administrative (1974 to mid-1990s)
- CoU County Top – Current County or Unitary Authority
- CoL County Top – Current London Borough
- SIB Significant Island of Britain
- Dil Dillon
- A Arderin
- VL Vandeleur-Lynam
- O Other list (which includes):
  - Bin Binnion
  - Bg Bridge
  - BL Buxton & Lewis
  - Ca Carn
  - CT Corbett Top
  - GT Graham Top
  - Mur Murdo
  - P500 P500
  - P600 P600
- Un unclassified

prefixes:
- s sub
- x deleted

suffixes:
= twin

== People who have climbed all hills in a group ==
As of 31 December 2023, 7,654 people had climbed all 282 Scottish Munros; as of April 2020 eleven people had climbed all 1556 Marilyns of Great Britain; (Note: Does include the IOM, but does not include the 454 Marilyns on the Island of Ireland) while as of December 2024 only six people had climbed all the 2532 Simms of Great Britain: (Note: Does not include IOM or Ireland) Ken Whyte (Cruachan Beag 21/09/2010), Iain Thow (Cut Hill 07/06/2015), Michael Earnshaw (Cruach Fhiarach 16/07/2019), Rob Woodall (Sgurr Dhonuill West Top 28/06/2021), Anne Bunn (Torr Ceum na Caillich, 24/09/2022) and Callum Gray (Sgurr Dubh, 21/12/2024). The first three have also climbed the Irish Simms, so including all the Simms of the British Isles.

== See also ==
- Lists of mountains and hills in the British Isles
- Lists of mountains in Ireland
- List of Munro mountains
- List of Murdo mountains
- List of Furth mountains in the British Isles
- List of Marilyns in the British Isles
- List of P600 mountains in the British Isles
