= List of mountains of the British Isles by height (2501–3000) =

Highest mountains in Great Britain ("Simms" classification)
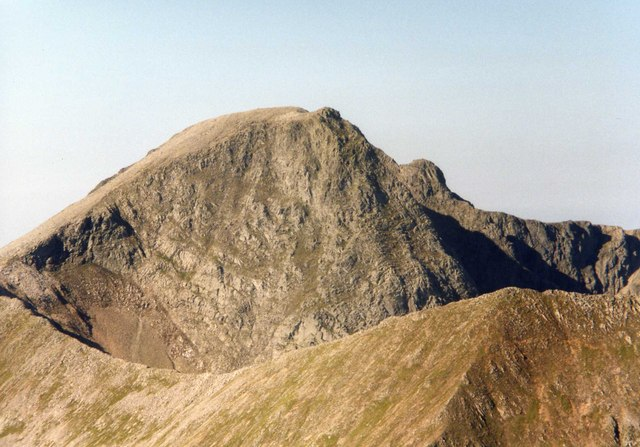
- Ben Nevis, in the Scottish Highlands, is the highest mountain in The British Isles

Highest point
- Elevation: over 600 m (1,969 ft)
- Prominence: over 30 m (98 ft)

Geography
- Location: 2,756 British Isles: 2,192 Scotland; 223 Ireland (Note: As of October 2018, the Irish MountainViews Online Database, list the prominence of Knockbrinnea (W) as 29m, and Carrignabinnia as 27 m, and thus they do not qualify as Irish Arderins, which means that MountainViews does not classify these two peaks as Simms; the total number of Irish Arderins over 600 m is thus 222. The DoBIH however uses the Harvey Tables which list the prominence for both at 30 m, and thus the DoBIH class them as Irish Simms, giving 224 Irish Simms in total.); 192 England; 150 Wales; 1 Isle of Man

This article provides access to lists of mountains in Britain and Ireland by height and by prominence. (See Lists of mountains below.) Height and prominence are the most important metrics for the classifications of mountains by the UIAA; with isolation a distant third criterion. (Note: No definition of a British Isles mountain or hill uses an explicit quantitative metric of topographic isolation (e.g. distance to the next point of equal height), however, the concept of isolation is embedded in the qualitative definition of a Scottish Munro, from the Scottish Mountaineering Club requirement of "sufficient separation" (instead of prominence).) The list is sourced from the Database of British and Irish Hills ("DoBIH") (Note: The Database of British and Irish Hills ("DoBIH") is the most referenced database for the classification of peaks in the British Isles, and the DoBIH is licensed under a "Creative Commons Attribution 3.0 Unported License".) for peaks that meet the consensus height threshold for a mountain, namely 600 metres (1,969 ft); the list also rules out peaks with a prominence below 30 metres (98 ft) and thus, the list is therefore precisely a list of the 2,756 (Note: Some sites list 2753 Simms, however, the Database of British and Irish Hills ("DoBIH") has added an extra Irish Simm, Knockbrinnea (W), bringing the total as at October 2022 to 2756.) Simms in the British Isles (as at October 2022). Many classifications of mountains in the British Isles consider a prominence between 30–150 metres (98–492 ft) as being a "top", and not a mountain; however, using the 30 metres (98 ft) prominence threshold gives the broadest possible list of mountains. For a ranking of mountains with a higher prominence threshold use:

- List of Marilyns in the British Isles, for ranking by height and by prominence, of peaks with prominence over 150 metres (492 ft); or
- List of P600 mountains in the British Isles, for ranking by height and by prominence, of peaks with prominence over 600 metres (1,969 ft)

== Coverage of Simms ==
Despite using the lower threshold for prominence of 30 metres (98 ft), the UIAA threshold for an "independent" peak, one Scottish Munro is missing, namely Maoile Lunndaidh whose official prominence changed to 11 metres (36 ft) in 2014; (Note: 281 of the 282 Scottish Munros have an official OSI prominence above 30 m, except Maoile Lunndaidh, who was found in a 2014 survey to be lower than nearby Creag Toll a' Choin. Thus, Maoile Lunndaidh had its official prominence downgraded from 400 m to just under 11 m, and the 400 m of prominence given to Creag Toll a' Choin. Note that Creag Toll a' Choin had previously been a Munro until older surveys downgraded its status in favour of Maoile Lunndaidh.) (Note: There is no known "composite" list of British Isles mountains that merges the Munro definition with other defined lists; the closest defined lists that include almost all Munros, are those that reduce the minimum prominence threshold to 30 metres (98 ft).) As of October 2018, the list of 2,754 British Isles Simms contained:

1. 281 of the 282 Munros, and 158 of the 226 Munro Tops;
2. All 222 Corbetts, all 219 Grahams, and all 118 Scottish New Donalds;
3. 872 of the 2,011 British Isles Marilyns;
4. All 524 of the England, Wales, and Ireland Hewitts;
5. 117 of the 541 Lake District Birketts (of which 99 are Wainwrights), that meet the Simms criteria;
6. All 224 of the 407 Irish Arderins with a height above 600.0 m;
7. All of the 120 P600 ("major") mountains in the British Isles;
8. 33 of the 34 England, Wales and Ireland Furths. (Note: 33 of the 34 SMC Furths have a prominence above 30 metres (98 feet), however, Caher West Top in Ireland, has a prominence of 24 metres (79 feet).)

== Simms by height by prominence ==
This list was downloaded from the DoBIH in October 2018, and includes all British and Irish peaks with a prominence below 30 metres (98 ft). Note that topographical prominence is complex to measure and requires a survey of the entire contours of a peak, rather than a single point of height. These tables are therefore subject to being revised over time, and should not be amended or updated unless the entire DoBIH data is re-downloaded again. The default table ranking is by height, so where the table is sorted by for example Region, the table will list the mountains within each Region by order of height.

Regional Top: The highest mountain in England, Wales, Scotland, Ireland, or the Isle of Man

== Lists of mountains ==
- List of mountains of the British Isles by height (1–500)
- List of mountains of the British Isles by height (501–1000)
- List of mountains of the British Isles by height (1001–1500)
- List of mountains of the British Isles by height (1501–2000)
- List of mountains of the British Isles by height (2001–2500)
- List of mountains of the British Isles by height (2501–3000)

Britain and Ireland mountains ranked by height and by prominence, Simms classification (DoBIH, October 2018)
Height Total	Prom. Total	Region	Height Region	Prom. Region	Name	Height (m)	Prom. (m)	Height (ft)	Prom. (ft)	Map Sec.	Topo Map	OS Grid Reference	Classification (§ DoBIH codes)
2501	1001	England	165	70	Randygill Top	624	131	2,047	430	35A	91	NY687000	Hu,Sim,Hew,N
2502	935	Scotland	2018	707	Meall Buidhe	624	141	2,047	463	03C	50	NN182375	Hu,Sim,sMa
2503	383	Scotland	2019	284	Meall nan Caorach	624	322	2,046	1,056	01A	52	NN928338	Ma,G,Sim
2504	1698	Scotland	2020	1320	Dundreich	623	67	2,044	220	28A	73	NT274490	Sim,D
2505	1716	Scotland	2021	1335	Whitehope Law	623	66	2,044	217	28A	73	NT330445	Sim,D
2506	2379	Scotland	2022	1873	Meall Odhar	623	38	2,044	125	01A	52	NN855425	Sim
2507	2475	Scotland	2023	1952	Ben Uarie	623	36	2,044	118	16D	17	NC927164	Sim
2508	746	Wales	122	47	Moel Ysgyfarnogod	623	180	2,044	591	30D	124	SH658345	Ma,Sim,Hew,N
2509	2115	Scotland	2024	1656	Bell Craig	623	47	2,044	154	28B	79	NT186128	Sim,D
2510	1809	Scotland	2025	1410	Coran of Portmark	623	61	2,044	200	27B	77	NX509936	Sim,D
2511	621	Ireland	199	79	An Scraig	623	215	2,044	705	49A	70	Q460057	Ma,Sim,Hew,Dil,A,VL
2512	2380	Scotland	2026	1874	Beinn Bhreac	623	38	2,044	125	19C	56	NS162940	Sim
2513	2553	Scotland	2027	2017	Cairn Geldie	623	34	2,044	112	08A	43	NN995885	Sim
2514	413	Scotland	2028	305	Creag Ruadh	622	309	2,041	1,014	09C	35	NN558913	Ma,G,Sim
2515	962	Scotland	2029	728	An Caisteal	622	137	2,041	449	10B	33	NG893043	Hu,Sim
2516	1925	Scotland	2030	1500	Creag nan Gall	622	55	2,041	180	08A	36	NJ005102	Sim
2517	2698	Scotland	2031	2142	Sguman Mor	622	31	2,041	102	09B	35	NH811189	Sim
2518	969	Wales	123	60	Craig-y-llyn	622	136	2,041	446	30F	124	SH665119	Hu,Sim,Hew,N
2519	1398	Ireland	200	150	Mullach Glas	622	88	2,041	289	47C	45	L937492	Sim,Hew,Dil,A,VL
2520	2381	Scotland	2032	1875	Ben Ever	622	38	2,041	125	26A	58	NN893000	Sim,DT
2521	2045	Scotland	2033	1598	Meall na Spianaig	621	50	2,037	164	06A	42	NN720776	Sim
2522	103	Isle of Man	1	1	Snaefell; Highest in Isle of Man	621	621	2,037	2,037	29	95	SC397880	Ma,Sim,CoH,CoU,CoA
2523	630	Scotland	2034	474	Creag Ghuanach	621	212	2,037	696	04A	41	NN299690	Ma,G,Sim
2524	850	Scotland	2035	641	Tom Meadhoin	621	155	2,037	509	04A	41	NN087621	Ma,G,Sim
2525	1113	Scotland	2036	853	Meall Leacachain	621	115	2,037	377	15A	20	NH244770	Hu,Sim
2526	162	England	166	6	High Willhays	621	537	2,037	1,762	40	191	SX580892	Ma,Sim,Hew,N,CoH,CoU,CoA
2527	2516	Wales	124	142	Moel yr Henfaes	621	35	2,037	115	30E	125	SJ089369	Sim,Hew,N
2528	795	England	167	48	Cold Fell	621	168	2,037	551	35A	86	NY605556	Ma,Sim,Hew,N
2529	601	Ireland	201	77	Maulin	621	225	2,037	738	51A	84	V712505	Ma,Sim,Hew,Dil,A,VL
2530	1685	Scotland	2037	1309	Meall nam Fiadh	620	68	2,035	222	01A	51	NN691272	Sim
2531	1253	Scotland	2038	958	Ben Halton	620	100	2,035	327	01B	51 52 57	NN720203	Sim,sHu
2532	1717	Scotland	2039	1336	Elrig	620	66	2,034	217	06A	43	NN871724	Sim
2533	104	Scotland	2040	74	Beinn Mhor	620	620	2,034	2,034	24C	22	NF808310	Ma,G,Sim,SIB
2534	1321	Scotland	2041	1014	Beinn Bheag	620	93	2,034	305	12B	25	NH105376	Sim,sHu
2535	2242	Scotland	2042	1760	Meall na Speireig	620	42	2,034	138	15B	20	NH495661	Sim
2536	2517	Scotland	2043	1989	Aonach Sgoilte Far West Top	620	35	2,034	115	10B	33	NG821017	Sim
2537	1114	Scotland	2044	854	Dungeon Hill	620	115	2,034	377	27B	77	NX460850	Hu,Sim,D
2538	1128	Wales	125	65	Gallt y Daren	619	113	2,032	371	30D	124	SH778344	Hu,Sim,Hew,N
2539	2658	Scotland	2045	2106	Creag na h-Iolaire	619	32	2,031	104	01C	51	NN561257	Sim
2540	1193	Scotland	2046	912	Beinn Tharsuinn	619	106	2,031	347	19C	56	NN164016	Hu,Sim
2541	1057	Scotland	2047	807	Lousie Wood Law	619	123	2,031	404	27C	71 78	NS932152	Hu,Sim,D
2542	518	Scotland	2048	380	Cauldcleuch Head	619	256	2,031	840	28B	79	NT456006	Ma,G,Sim,D
2543	747	Wales	126	48	Cefn yr Ystrad	619	180	2,031	591	32A	160	SO087136	Ma,Sim,Hew,N
2544	1118	Scotland	2049	858	The Scurran	619	114	2,031	374	01A	52	NN885305	Hu,Sim
2545	1952	Scotland	2050	1520	Creag Choille	619	54	2,031	177	01A	52	NN855409	Sim
2546	1129	England	168	80	Windy Gyle	619	113	2,031	371	33	80	NT855152	Hu,Sim,Hew,N,D
2547	2476	Scotland	2051	1953	Cairnbrallan	619	36	2,031	118	21A	37	NJ332245	Sim
2548	341	Scotland	2052	249	Beinn an Eoin	619	355	2,031	1,165	16F	15	NC104064	Ma,G,Sim
2549	1119	Scotland	2053	859	Clach-Mheall Dubh	619	114	2,031	374	05B	35	NN727904	Hu,Sim
2550	2214	Scotland	2054	1738	Beinn an Albannaich	619	43	2,031	141	18B	40	NM762648	Sim
2551	2650	Scotland	2055	2099	Druim a' Ghoirtein Far West Top	619	32	2,031	105	10B	33 40	NM883957	Sim
2552	2215	England	169	148	Bink Moss	619	43	2,031	141	35A	91 92	NY875242	Sim,Hew,N
2553	1417	Ireland	202	151	Dart Mountain	619	86	2,031	282	44B	13	H602963	Sim,Hew,Dil,A,VL
2554	527	Scotland	2056	387	Pressendye	619	254	2,031	833	21B	37	NJ490089	Ma,G,Sim
2555	2123	Scotland	2057	1663	Meall nam Fiadh Far East Top	619	46	2,029	152	01A	51 52	NN707272	Sim
2556	1615	Scotland	2058	1253	Crungie Clach	618	72	2,028	236	06B	43	NN987656	Sim
2557	1309	Scotland	2059	1007	Meall Cos Charnan	618	94	2,028	308	04B	42	NN433774	Sim,sHu
2558	1310	Scotland	2060	1008	Carn Phris Mhoir	618	94	2,028	308	09B	35	NH807218	Sim,sHu
2559	2424	Scotland	2061	1910	Carn Ruadh-bhreac	618	37	2,028	121	08B	36	NJ124129	Sim
2560	337	Ireland	203	53	Leenaun Hill	618	359	2,028	1,178	47C	37	L874593	Ma,Sim,Hew,Dil,A,VL
2561	435	Scotland	2062	323	Beinn Bheag	618	300	2,028	984	19C	56	NS125931	Ma,G,Sim
2562	697	Scotland	2063	526	Cruach Choireadail	618	194	2,028	636	17E	48	NM594304	Ma,G,Sim
2563	2273	Scotland	2064	1786	Hill of Cammie	618	41	2,028	135	07B	44	NO526854	Sim
2564	2092	Scotland	2065	1634	Meall a' Choire	618	48	2,027	157	02A	52	NN881568	Sim
2565	2429	Scotland	2066	1914	Sron na Maoile	618	37	2,027	120	01B	57	NN690177	Sim
2566	856	Scotland	2067	645	Meall Reamhar	618	154	2,027	505	01A	52	NN922332	Ma,G,Sim
2567	2146	Scotland	2068	1680	Meall a' Charra	617	45	2,026	148	02A	52	NN890576	Sim
2568	1635	Scotland	2069	1269	Cul na Creige	617	71	2,024	233	01A	51	NN620298	Sim
2569	1506	Scotland	2070	1167	Beinn a' Chruachain	617	79	2,024	259	06B	43	NO046695	Sim
2570	777	Scotland	2071	583	Carn na h-Easgainn	617	173	2,024	568	09B	27	NH743320	Ma,G,Sim
2571	1221	Ireland	204	129	Coumaraglin Mountain	617	103	2,024	338	54A	75 82	S282042	Hu,Sim,Hew,Dil,A,VL
2572	1243	Ireland	205	135	Slieve Loughshannagh	617	101	2,024	331	43B	29	J294272	Hu,Sim,Hew,Dil,A,VL
2573	1192	Scotland	2072	911	Peter Hill	617	106	2,024	348	07B	44	NO577885	Hu,Sim
2574	1381	Scotland	2073	1063	Meall Gorm	617	89	2,024	292	08B	36 43	NO184945	Sim
2575	2170	Scotland	2074	1700	Finlate Hill	617	45	2,024	148	21A	37	NJ292178	Sim
2576	886	England	170	58	Cushat Law	616	148	2,022	485	33	80	NT928137	Hu,Sim,Hew,N,sMa
2577	1742	Scotland	2075	1356	Beinn Clachach West Top	616	64	2,021	211	10A	33	NG875106	Sim
2578	1456	Scotland	2076	1123	Carn Ruabraich	616	82	2,021	269	08B	36	NJ136124	Sim
2579	239	Scotland	2077	174	Beinn na Gucaig	616	451	2,021	1,480	04A	41	NN062653	Ma,G,Sim
2580	1350	Scotland	2078	1038	Carn Tarsuinn	616	91	2,021	299	11B	26	NH386221	Sim,sHu
2581	1507	Scotland	2079	1168	Carn Mor East Top	616	79	2,021	259	10D	33 40	NM925910	Sim
2582	1681	Scotland	2080	1306	Beinn Bheag	616	68	2,021	223	03A	41	NN220579	Sim
2583	2243	Scotland	2081	1761	Beinn Chraoibh	616	42	2,021	138	10C	34	NN141925	Sim
2584	2699	Scotland	2082	2143	Aonach Mor	616	31	2,021	102	06A	35 43	NN806944	Sim
2585	1130	England	171	81	Great Borne	616	113	2,021	371	34B	89	NY123163	Hu,Sim,Hew,N,W,B,Sy,Fel
2586	2601	England	172	179	Yewbarrow North Top	616	33	2,021	108	34B	89 90	NY175091	Sim,Hew,N,B,Sy
2587	1212	Wales	127	70	Garreg Lwyd	616	104	2,021	341	32A	160	SN740179	Hu,Sim,Hew,N
2588	2048	Scotland	2083	1601	Mid Rig	616	50	2,020	164	28B	79	NT180122	Sim,DT
2589	2700	Scotland	2084	2144	Carn Cul-sgor	616	31	2,020	102	12B	26	NH340351	Sim
2590	364	Scotland	2085	267	Carn nan Tri-tighearnan	615	333	2,018	1,093	09A	27	NH823390	Ma,G,Sim
2591	2140	Scotland	2086	1675	Meall nan Oighreagan	615	46	2,018	151	11B	26	NH372226	Sim
2592	2382	Scotland	2087	1876	Creag Bhreac	615	38	2,018	125	04A	41	NN077617	Sim
2593	119	Ireland	206	25	Slieve Snaght	615	600	2,018	1,969	45A	03	C424390	Ma,Sim,Hew,Dil,A,VL
2594	2708	Scotland	2088	2151	Herman Law	614	31	2,016	101	28B	79	NT213156	Sim,D
2595	2662	Scotland	2089	2110	Sgurr Mor Near West Top	614	31	2,015	103	10A	33	NG875079	Sim
2596	2701	England	173	187	The Dodd	614	31	2,014	102	35A	86 87	NY791457	Sim,Hew,N
2597	1718	England	174	116	Drumaldrace	614	66	2,014	217	35B	98	SD873867	Sim,Hew,N
2598	2337	Scotland	2090	1836	Mullach an Langa	614	39	2,014	128	24B	13 14	NB143094	Sim
2599	1682	Scotland	2091	1307	Carn na Ruighe Duibhe	614	68	2,014	223	11B	26	NH373244	Sim
2600	2425	Scotland	2092	1911	Meall a' Mheil	614	37	2,014	121	10A	33	NH052032	Sim
2601	2608	Scotland	2093	2063	Sgurr Mor West Top	614	33	2,014	107	10A	33	NG871081	Sim
2602	2651	Wales	128	148	Llechwedd Du	614	32	2,014	105	30E	124 125	SH893223	Sim,Hew,N
2603	2216	England	175	149	Flinty Fell	614	43	2,014	141	35A	86 87	NY770422	Sim,Hew,N
2604	2723	Scotland	2094	2165	Suie Dhu	614	30	2,014	99	11A	25 33	NG999254	Sim
2605	1399	Wales	129	78	Gorllwyn	613	88	2,011	289	31C	147	SN917590	Sim,Hew,N
2606	547	Scotland	2095	407	Beinn a' Mheadhoin	613	245	2,011	804	11A	25	NH218255	Ma,G,Sim
2607	810	Scotland	2096	610	Meall an Fheur Loch	613	165	2,011	541	16E	16	NC361310	Ma,G,Sim
2608	2141	Scotland	2097	1676	Druim Dubh	613	46	2,011	151	12A	25	NH202446	Sim
2609	2383	Scotland	2098	1877	Bow	613	38	2,011	125	27B	77	NX508928	Sim,DT
2610	2089	Scotland	2099	1633	Stob nan Eighrach	613	48	2,011	157	01C	50 56	NN342144	Sim
2611	2142	Wales	130	125	Foel Goch	613	46	2,010	151	30E	125	SH943290	Sim,Hew,N
2612	1824	Scotland	2100	1420	Am Bacan	612	60	2,008	197	01A	51	NN607294	Sim
2613	843	Scotland	2101	635	Creag a' Mhadaidh	612	156	2,008	512	05A	42	NN634650	Ma,G,Sim
2614	1106	Scotland	2102	846	Gualann Sheileach	612	116	2,008	381	05A	42	NN617651	Hu,Sim
2615	249	Scotland	2103	184	Stac Pollaidh	612	441	2,008	1,447	16F	15	NC107106	Ma,G,Sim
2616	1015	Scotland	2104	769	Meallan Odhar	612	129	2,008	423	11B	34	NH211173	Hu,Sim
2617	2477	Scotland	2105	1954	Sgurr Mor	612	36	2,008	118	10D	33 40	NM825920	Sim
2618	2384	England	176	164	Middlehope Moor	612	38	2,008	125	35A	87	NY862432	Sim,Hew,N
2619	1975	Scotland	2106	1541	Meikle Mulltaggart	612	53	2,008	174	27B	83	NX511678	Sim,DT
2620	202	Scotland	2107	143	Cruach nan Capull	612	486	2,008	1,594	19C	63	NS095795	Ma,G,Sim
2621	2558	Scotland	2108	2021	Meall nam Fiadh East Top	612	33	2,008	110	01A	51	NN696274	Sim
2622	464	Scotland	2109	341	Cruach nam Mult	611	282	2,005	925	19C	56	NN168056	Ma,G,Sim
2623	796	Scotland	2110	598	Creag Dhubh Mhor	611	168	2,005	551	12A	25	NG982404	Ma,G,Sim
2624	1071	Scotland	2111	819	Beinn Edra	611	121	2,005	397	17A	23	NG455626	Hu,Sim
2625	1164	Scotland	2112	890	Earncraig Hill	611	109	2,005	358	27C	78	NS973013	Hu,Sim,D
2626	1165	Ireland	207	122	Tievebaun	611	109	2,005	358	45D	16	G768499	Hu,Sim,Hew,Dil,A,VL
2627	2171	Ireland	208	197	Knockbrack	611	45	2,005	148	52A	78	V953779	Sim,Hew,Dil,A,VL
2628	476	Wales	131	30	Foel Goch	611	274	2,005	899	30D	125	SH953422	Ma,Sim,Hew,N
2629	698	Wales	132	43	Pen y Garn	611	194	2,005	636	31C	135 147	SN798771	Ma,Sim,Hew,N
2630	2667	Scotland	2113	2115	Creag Ghorm	610	31	2,003	102	01A	52	NN925346	Sim
2631	2274	Wales	133	133	Bache Hill	610	41	2,001	135	31B	137 148	SO213636	Sim,Hew,N
2632	1994	Scotland	2114	1557	Innerdownie	610	52	2,001	171	26A	58	NN966031	Sim,D
2633	834	England	177	52	Birks Fell	610	158	2,001	518	35B	98	SD918763	Ma,Sim,Hew,N
2634	2311	Scotland	2115	1814	Carn na Caorach	610	40	2,001	131	11B	34	NH323187	Sim
2635	2275	Ireland	209	203	Coombane	610	41	2,001	135	49B	70	Q567091	Sim,Hew,Dil,A,VL
2636	708	Wales	134	45	Tal y Fan	610	190	2,001	622	30B	115	SH729726	Ma,Sim,Hew,N
2637	1121	England	178	79	Bloodybush Edge	610	114	2,001	373	33	80	NT902143	Hu,Sim,Hew,N
2638	1636	Wales	135	96	Mynydd Graig Goch	610	71	2,000	233	30B	115 123	SH497485	Sim,Hew,N
2639	1860	England	179	125	Thack Moor	610	58	2,000	190	35A	86	NY611462	Sim,Hew,N
2640	404	England	180	22	Calf Top	610	313	2,000	1,027	35B	98	SD664856	Ma,Sim,Hew,N
2641	2751	England	181	192	Horse Head Moor	609	30	1,999	98	35B	98	SD894769	Sim,Dew
2642	859	Scotland	2116	648	Corwharn	609	153	1,998	500	07A	44	NO288651	Ma,Sim,HF,xG
2643	670	Scotland	2117	503	Ladylea Hill	609	201	1,998	659	21A	37	NJ343168	Ma,Sim,HF,xG
2644	2602	Scotland	2118	2058	Am Bacan North Top	609	33	1,998	108	01A	51	NN605301	Sim,HF
2645	458	Wales	136	28	Mynydd Troed	609	286	1,998	938	32A	161	SO165292	Ma,Sim,Dew
2646	2046	Scotland	2119	1599	Gurlet	609	50	1,998	164	06B	43	NN998648	Sim,HF
2647	374	Scotland	2120	275	Ben Aslak	609	329	1,998	1,079	17C	33	NG750191	Ma,Sim,HF,xG
2648	1400	Scotland	2121	1077	Carn Choire Odhair	609	88	1,998	289	09B	35	NH751283	Sim,HF
2649	1491	Scotland	2122	1154	Sron Gharbh	609	80	1,998	262	16C	17	ND054266	Sim,HF
2650	1752	Scotland	2123	1365	Creag Mhor a' Bhinnein	609	64	1,998	210	14A	19	NH035776	Sim,HF
2651	402	England	182	21	Illgill Head	609	314	1,998	1,030	34B	89	NY168049	Ma,Sim,Dew,W,B,Sy,Fel
2652	604	Ireland	210	78	Corcog	609	223	1,998	732	47C	45	L952491	Ma,Sim,Dil,A,VL,MDew
2653	1861	Wales	137	108	Moel Meirch	609	58	1,998	190	30B	115	SH661503	Sim,Dew
2654	2312	Wales	138	135	Craig Fach	609	40	1,997	131	30B	115	SH634552	Sim,Dew
2655	1120	Scotland	2124	860	Creag a' Lain	609	114	1,997	374	17A	23	NG464586	Hu,Sim,HF
2656	2615	Scotland	2125	2070	Wylies Hill	608	32	1,996	106	28B	72	NT160215	Sim,DDew
2657	2276	Scotland	2126	1787	Creag nan Gabhar	608	41	1,995	135	01A	52	NN879399	Sim,HF
2658	1903	Scotland	2127	1482	Meall an Domhnaich	608	56	1,995	184	09B	35	NN536953	Sim,HF
2659	1995	Scotland	2128	1558	Creachan Thormaid	608	52	1,995	171	16B	9	NC344437	Sim,HF
2660	2385	Scotland	2129	1878	Meall an Uillt Bhain	608	38	1,995	125	10A	33	NG971056	Sim,HF
2661	2143	Scotland	2130	1677	Dugland	608	46	1,995	151	27C	77	NS602008	Sim,DDew,xDT
2662	970	England	183	67	High Seat	608	136	1,995	446	34B	89 90	NY287180	Hu,Sim,Dew,W,B,Sy,Fel
2663	1433	Wales	139	81	Glan-hafon	608	84	1,994	276	30E	125	SJ080272	Sim,Dew
2664	2702	Scotland	2131	2145	Nowtrig Head	608	31	1,994	102	28B	79	NT175116	Sim,DDew
2665	2282	Scotland	2132	1793	Sgurr a' Mheadhain	608	40	1,993	132	18A	40	NM748765	Sim,HF
2666	1051	Scotland	2133	801	Eskielawn	607	123	1,992	404	07A	44	NO273664	Hu,Sim,HF
2667	2703	Scotland	2134	2146	Am Bacan South Top	607	31	1,991	102	01A	51	NN604291	Sim,HF
2668	2277	Scotland	2135	1788	Meall Dubh	607	41	1,991	135	05A	42	NN654600	Sim,HF
2669	2603	Scotland	2136	2059	Scaut Hill	607	33	1,991	108	21A	37	NJ335314	Sim,HF
2670	567	Scotland	2137	422	Burach	607	236	1,991	774	10C	34	NH383141	Ma,Sim,HF
2671	1904	Ireland	211	179	Macklaun	607	56	1,991	184	50A	78 83	V660837	Sim,A,VL,MDew
2672	443	Scotland	2138	328	Cruach Neuran	607	296	1,991	971	19C	56	NS083820	Ma,Sim,HF
2673	651	Scotland	2139	490	Cruach nam Miseag	607	206	1,991	676	19C	56	NS182981	Ma,Sim,HF
2674	2014	Scotland	2140	1575	Meall Beag	607	51	1,991	167	01D	50 56	NN232129	Sim,HF
2675	1371	Scotland	2141	1055	Bulg	607	90	1,991	295	07B	44	NO543761	Sim,HF,sHu
2676	2338	Scotland	2142	1837	Meall na Greine	607	39	1,990	128	18C	49	NM799527	Sim,HF
2677	2666	Scotland	2143	2114	Meall a' Choire Chreagaich East Top	606	31	1,989	102	01A	52	NN803411	Sim,HF
2678	2387	Scotland	2144	1880	Cairnmorris Hill	606	38	1,989	124	26A	58	NN933016	Sim,DDew
2679	2426	Scotland	2145	1912	Meall Gaothach	606	37	1,988	121	01C	57	NN457135	Sim,HF
2680	415	Scotland	2146	307	Hecla	606	308	1,988	1,010	24C	22	NF825344	Ma,Sim,HF
2681	1296	Scotland	2147	995	Meall Mhic Iomhair	606	95	1,988	312	14B	20	NH316673	Sim,HF,sHu
2682	2752	Scotland	2148	2187	Meall Bhaideanach	606	30	1,988	98	09C	34 41	NN391830	Sim,HF
2683	2753	Scotland	2149	2188	Beinn Tharsuinn Chaol Far West Top	606	30	1,988	98	14A	19	NG980751	Sim,HF
2684	2116	Wales	140	123	Foel Tyn-y-fron	606	47	1,988	154	30E	125	SH918257	Sim,Dew
2685	674	Scotland	2150	507	Well Hill	606	200	1,988	656	27C	71 78	NS913064	Ma,Sim,DDew
2686	174	Ireland	212	36	Croghan Kinsella	606	520	1,988	1,706	55A	62	T130728	Ma,Sim,A,VL,MDew
2687	1179	Ireland	213	125	Cnoc na hUilleann	606	108	1,988	354	47C	37	L870537	Hu,Sim,A,VL,MDew
2688	2604	Scotland	2151	2060	Cnoc na Tricriche	606	33	1,988	108	19C	56	NS166966	Sim,HF
2689	1297	Scotland	2152	996	Culblean Hill	606	95	1,988	312	21A	37	NJ398007	Sim,HF,sHu
2690	1492	Scotland	2153	1155	Cnap a' Choire Bhuidhe	606	80	1,988	262	07A	44	NO228899	Sim,HF
2691	1844	Scotland	2154	1438	Carn Mor	606	59	1,988	194	08B	37	NJ261070	Sim,HF
2692	2313	Scotland	2155	1815	Knockie Branar	606	40	1,988	131	07B	44	NO401928	Sim,HF
2693	1772	Scotland	2156	1383	Bad an Tuirc	605	63	1,985	207	06B	43	NO018670	Sim,HF
2694	1521	England	184	100	Little Whernside	605	78	1,985	256	35B	98	SE027775	Sim,Dew
2695	1470	Scotland	2157	1136	Carn Cas nan Gabhar	605	81	1,985	266	15B	20	NH526806	Sim,HF
2696	1522	Scotland	2158	1180	Watch Knowe	605	78	1,985	256	28B	79	NT183160	Sim,DDew
2697	1884	England	185	127	Arant Haw	605	57	1,985	187	35A	98	SD662946	Sim,Dew
2698	2090	England	186	144	Green Bell	605	48	1,985	157	35A	91	NY698010	Sim,Dew
2699	1326	Wales	141	76	Foel Goch	605	92	1,983	302	30B	115	SH571563	Sim,Dew,sHu
2700	1927	Wales	142	115	Craig Portas	604	54	1,982	178	30F	124 125	SH801141	Sim,Dew
2701	2067	Wales	143	120	Y Gamriw	604	49	1,982	161	31C	147	SN944611	Sim,Dew
2702	2314	Wales	144	136	Yr Allt	604	40	1,982	131	32A	160	SN905200	Sim,Dew
2703	2117	Scotland	2159	1657	Carn Dubh	604	47	1,982	154	10C	34	NN140944	Sim,HF
2704	2605	Scotland	2160	2061	Creag Dhubh	604	33	1,982	108	04B	41	NN378770	Sim,HF
2705	560	Ireland	214	74	Carran	604	240	1,982	787	52A	85	W052678	Ma,Sim,A,VL,MDew
2706	1719	Scotland	2161	1337	Maol Meadhonach	604	66	1,982	217	01D	50 56	NN245146	Sim,HF
2707	1166	Scotland	2162	891	Monadh nam Mial	604	109	1,981	358	01A	52	NN866442	Hu,Sim,HF
2708	1699	England	187	114	High Green Field Knott	603	67	1,979	220	35B	98	SD846784	Sim,Dew
2709	2386	Scotland	2163	1879	Stuc Odhar South Top	603	38	1,978	125	01C	57	NN557079	Sim,HF
2710	523	Scotland	2164	385	Beinn a' Chuirn	603	255	1,978	837	10A	33	NG870220	Ma,Sim,HF
2711	1252	Scotland	2165	957	Creag Ghiuthsachan	603	100	1,978	328	08A	35 36 43	NN860999	Hu,Sim,HF
2712	1372	Scotland	2166	1056	Carn Ruigh na Creadha	603	90	1,978	295	09B	35	NH531131	Sim,HF,sHu
2713	1810	Scotland	2167	1411	Druim nan Sac West Top	603	61	1,978	200	05B	42	NN691898	Sim,HF
2714	2315	Scotland	2168	1816	Carn na Saobhaidhe	603	40	1,978	131	09B	35	NH553141	Sim,HF
2715	1373	England	188	92	Cut Hill	603	90	1,978	295	40	191	SX598827	Sim,Dew,sHu
2716	2091	England	189	145	Hangingstone Hill	603	48	1,978	157	40	191	SX617861	Sim,Dew
2717	450	Ireland	215	65	Lackabane	603	291	1,978	955	51A	84	V751536	Ma,Sim,A,VL,MDew
2718	2339	Ireland	216	205	Gullaba Hill	603	39	1,978	128	52A	85	W005681	Sim,A,VL,MDew
2719	2754	Ireland	217	224	Baurtregaum Far NE Top	603	30	1,978	98	49B	71	Q768090	Sim,VL,MDew
2720	2665	Scotland	2169	2113	Scars of Milldown	603	31	1,978	103	27B	77	NX447768	Sim,DDew
2721	1741	Scotland	2170	1355	Meall Clachach	603	65	1,977	213	02B	51	NN543327	Sim,HF
2722	683	England	190	40	Peel Fell	603	197	1,977	646	33	80	NY625997	Ma,Sim,Dew
2723	2478	Scotland	2171	1955	Cnapan a' Choire Odhair Mhoir	603	36	1,977	118	09A	36	NH904299	Sim,HF
2724	944	Scotland	2172	713	Beinn a' Mheadhoin	603	138	1,977	453	17E	48	NM586313	Hu,Sim,HF
2725	328	Ireland	218	50	Aghla Beg South Top	602	366	1,976	1,201	45B	02	B965246	Ma,Sim,A,VL,MDew
2726	1811	Ireland	219	173	Black Hill	602	61	1,976	200	55B	56	O041090	Sim,A,VL,MDew
2727	258	Scotland	2173	192	Sgorach Mor	602	429	1,976	1,407	19C	56	NS096849	Ma,Sim,HF
2728	1638	Scotland	2174	1271	Hill of Mondurran	602	70	1,976	231	07B	44	NO462700	Sim,HF
2729	1886	Scotland	2175	1467	Creag a' Chanuill	602	57	1,975	186	19C	56	NS105843	Sim,HF
2730	1062	Scotland	2176	811	Dunslair Heights	602	122	1,975	400	28A	73	NT287436	Hu,Sim,DDew
2731	1471	Scotland	2177	1137	Millfore Hill	602	81	1,975	266	27B	77	NX507700	Sim,DDew
2732	1976	Ireland	220	185	Maumonght	602	53	1,975	174	47B	37	L749539	Sim,A,VL,MDew
2733	1535	Wales	145	86	Foel Fraith	602	77	1,975	253	32A	160	SN756183	Sim,Dew
2734	971	Scotland	2178	734	Crannach Hill	602	136	1,975	446	21A	37	NJ383007	Hu,Sim,HF
2735	1683	Ireland	221	167	Knockeenatoung	601	68	1,973	223	53A	74	R894219	Sim,A,VL,MDew
2736	622	Scotland	2179	468	Leagag	601	215	1,972	705	02A	42 51	NN518539	Ma,Sim,HF
2737	981	England	191	68	The Schil	601	134	1,972	440	33	74	NT869223	Hu,Sim,Dew,DDew
2738	381	Scotland	2180	282	Sithean Mor	601	323	1,972	1,060	10D	40	NM729866	Ma,Sim,HF
2739	1322	Scotland	2181	1015	Meall an t-Sithe	601	93	1,972	305	14A	20	NH141765	Sim,HF,sHu
2740	2518	Scotland	2182	1990	Beinn Bhreac	601	35	1,972	115	09B	35	NH757276	Sim,HF
2741	2554	Scotland	2183	2018	Cuirn Liatha	601	34	1,972	112	13B	25	NG986541	Sim,HF
2742	568	Scotland	2184	423	The Coyles of Muick	601	236	1,972	774	07A	44	NO328910	Ma,Sim,HF
2743	1457	Scotland	2185	1124	Creag nan Gall	601	82	1,972	269	07A	44	NO268915	Sim,HF
2744	2144	Scotland	2186	1678	Pannanich Hill	601	46	1,972	151	07B	37 44	NO392943	Sim,HF
2745	2618	Wales	146	147	Cefn Perfedd	601	32	1,971	106	30E	125	SJ099374	Sim,Dew
2746	2524	Scotland	2187	1996	Cruachan Beag	601	34	1,971	113	17E	47 48	NM578338	Sim,HF
2747	2528	Wales	147	143	Y Gribin	601	34	1,970	112	30E	124 125	SH843177	Sim,Dew
2748	1579	Scotland	2188	1227	Hare Hill	601	74	1,970	243	27C	71 77	NS654097	Sim,DDew
2749	972	Ireland	222	110	Eskatarriff	601	136	1,970	446	51A	84	V736533	Hu,Sim,A,VL,MDew
2750	1954	Wales	148	116	Foel Lwyd	600	53	1,969	175	30B	115	SH720723	Sim,Dew
2751	299	Wales	149	17	Craig y Llyn	600	392	1,969	1,286	32C	170	SN906031	Ma,Sim,Dew,CoH,CoU,CoA
2752	335	England	192	18	Black Combe	600	362	1,969	1,188	34D	96	SD135854	Ma,Sim,Dew,WO,B,Sy,Fel
2753	2217	Ireland	223	200	Castle Hill	600	43	1,969	141	49B	71	Q756063	Sim,A,VL,MDew
2754	869	Ireland	224	104	Silver Hill	600	151	1,969	495	45C	11	G906913	Ma,Sim,A,VL,MDew

== DoBIH codes ==
The DoBIH uses the following codes for the various classifications of mountains and hills in the British Isles, which many of the above peaks also fall into:

- Ma Marilyn
- Hu HuMP
- Sim Simm
- 5 Dodd
- M Munro
- MT Munro Top
- F Furth
- C Corbett
- G Graham
- D Donald
- DT Donald Top
- Hew Hewitt
- N Nuttall
- Dew Dewey
- DDew Donald Dewey
- HF Highland Five
- 4 400-499m Tump
- 3 300-399m Tump (GB)
- 2 200-299m Tump (GB)
- 1 100-199m Tump (GB)
- 0 0-99m Tump (GB)
- W Wainwright
- WO Wainwright Outlying Fell
- B Birkett
- Sy Synge
- Fel Fellranger
- CoH County Top – Historic (pre-1974)
- CoA County Top – Administrative (1974 to mid-1990s)
- CoU County Top – Current County or Unitary Authority
- CoL County Top – Current London Borough
- SIB Significant Island of Britain
- Dil Dillon
- A Arderin
- VL Vandeleur-Lynam
- O Other list (which includes):
  - Bin Binnion
  - Bg Bridge
  - BL Buxton & Lewis
  - Ca Carn
  - CT Corbett Top
  - GT Graham Top
  - Mur Murdo
  - P500 P500
  - P600 P600
- Un unclassified

prefixes:
- s sub
- x deleted

suffixes:
= twin

== People who have climbed all hills in a group ==
As of 31 December 2023, 7,654 people had climbed all 282 Scottish Munros; as of April 2020 eleven people had climbed all 1556 Marilyns of Great Britain; (Note: Does include the IOM, but does not include the 454 Marilyns on the Island of Ireland) while as of December 2024 only six people had climbed all the 2532 Simms of Great Britain: (Note: Does not include IOM or Ireland) Ken Whyte (Cruachan Beag 21/09/2010), Iain Thow (Cut Hill 07/06/2015), Michael Earnshaw (Cruach Fhiarach 16/07/2019), Rob Woodall (Sgurr Dhonuill West Top 28/06/2021), Anne Bunn (Torr Ceum na Caillich, 24/09/2022) and Callum Gray (Sgurr Dubh, 21/12/2024). The first three have also climbed the Irish Simms, so including all the Simms of the British Isles.

== See also ==
- Lists of mountains and hills in the British Isles
- Lists of mountains in Ireland
- List of Munro mountains
- List of Murdo mountains
- List of Furth mountains in the British Isles
- List of Marilyns in the British Isles
- List of P600 mountains in the British Isles
