= Sgùrr an Utha and Fraoch-bheinn =

Two hills in Scotland

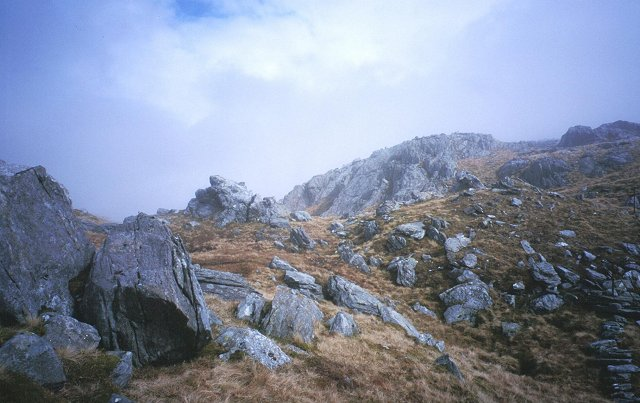
- West ridge of Sgùrr an Utha, just below the summit

Highest point
- Elevation: Sgùrr an Utha: 796 m (2,612 ft); Fraoch-bheinn: 790 m (2,592 ft)
- Prominence: Sgùrr an Utha: c. 501 m (1,644 ft); Fraoch-bheinn: 51 m (167 ft)
- Listing: Sgùrr an Utha: Corbett, Marilyn; Fraoch-bheinn: None
- Coordinates: NM889838 and NM893837 56°53′52″N 5°28′2″W

Naming
- English translation: Peak of the udder and Heather hill
- Language of name: Gaelic
- Pronunciation: [ˈs̪kuːrˠ ən ˈu.ə] and [ˈfɾɯːxveɲ]

Geography
- Location within Scotland
- Location: Lochaber, Scotland
- Topo map: OS Landranger 40

Sgùrr an Utha and Fraoch-bheinn are two hills above Glenfinnan, in Lochaber, Highland, Scotland. The two summits are joined by a summit ridge, which is 735 m above sea level at its lowest elevation. The glen of Glen Finnan itself lies just to the east.

This is the only known site in the British Isles for the arctic plant Diapensia lapponica, first discovered there in 1951.

The hills are most commonly climbed from Glen Finnan to the south. One possible route initially follows a track at the bottom of the river Allt an Utha which leaves the A830 road about 2.5 km west of Glenfinnan station to first ascend Sgùrr an Utha. A circular route may be made by continuing south from the summit of Fraoch-bheinn, eventually picking up the track on the slopes of Druim na Brein Choille, Fraoch-bheinn's southern ridge.

Alternative routes include a direct ascent of Fraoch-bheinn from Glenfinnan station, or by climbing to the low point between the two summits from the Caol-ghleann, the valley to the north side of the hill. Caol-ghlean curves round to meet Glen Finnan near the station, thus a circular route can be made by walkers using rail to access the area.
