= Sgùrr Dubh =

Sgurr Dubh
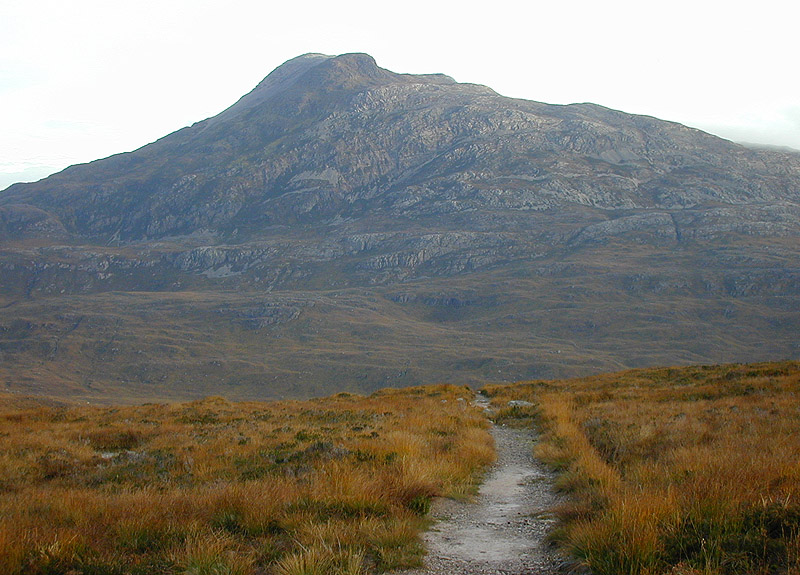
- Sgurr Dubh

Highest point
- Elevation: 782 m (2,566 ft)
- Prominence: 215 m (705 ft)
- Listing: Corbett, Marilyn
- Coordinates: 57°32′50″N 5°22′44″W

Geography
- Location: Wester Ross, Scotland
- Parent range: Northwest Highlands
- OS grid: NG979557
- Topo map: OS Landranger 25

Sgurr Dubh (The Black Steep Hill) is a mountain at 782 m in the Northwest Highlands, Scotland. It lies southwest of the village of Kinlochewe in Wester Ross.

The peak rises steeply on the south side of Glen Torridon. Although it is small compared to its giant neighbour Beinn Eighe on the other side of the glen, the mountain still has a character of its own.
