= Glas Bheinn (Assynt) =

Mountain in Scotland

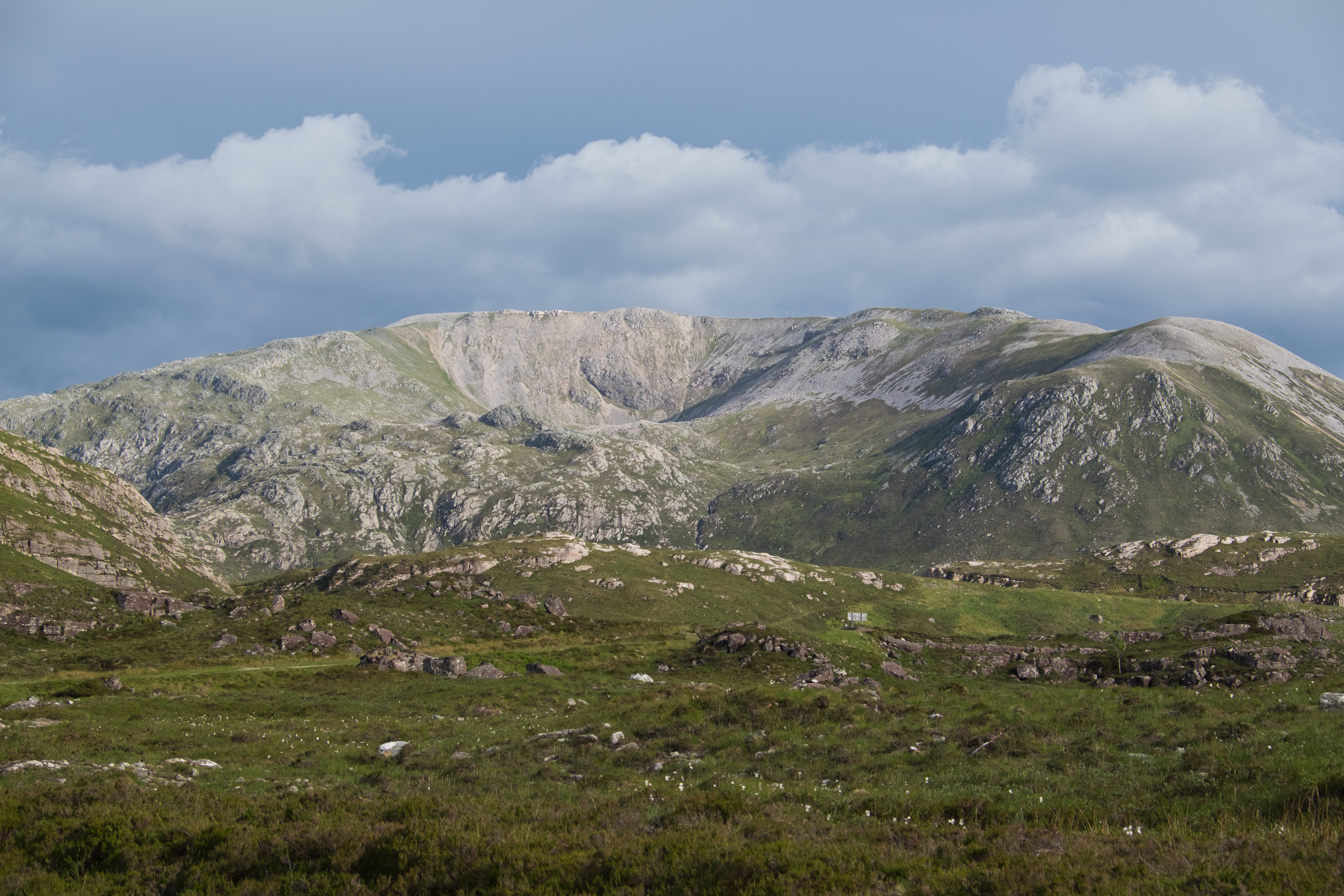
- Glas Bheinn

Highest point
- Elevation: 776 m (2,546 ft)
- Prominence: 159 m (522 ft)
- Listing: Corbett, Marilyn
- Coordinates: 58°11′34″N 4°58′15″W

Geography
- Location: Sutherland, Scotland
- Parent range: Northwest Highlands
- OS grid: NC254264
- Topo map: OS Landranger 15

Glas Bheinn (776 m) is a mountain in the Northwest Highlands of Scotland. It lies in the Assynt area of Sutherland, in the far north of the country.

A steep and rugged mountain in its own right, Britain's highest waterfall, the Eas a' Chual Aluinn, falls from its slopes.

Glas Bheinn lies between Ullapool and Durness.
