= Càrn Mòr =

Mountain in Scotland

Coordinates: 56.962053°N 5.450426°W

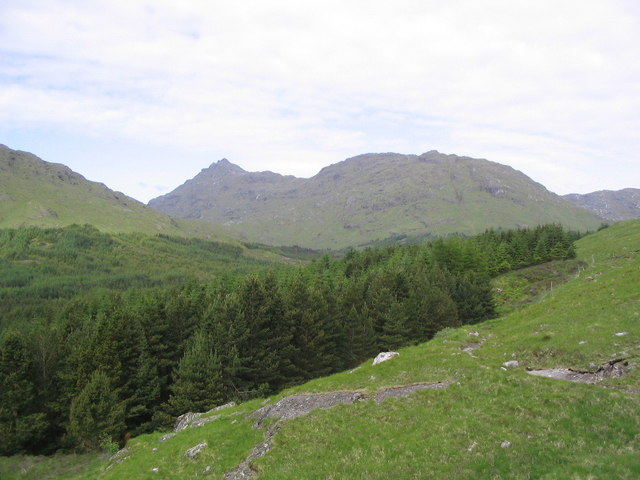
- Càrn Mor from Glen Dessary

Highest point
- Elevation: 829 m (2,720 ft)
- Prominence: 613 m (2,011 ft)
- Listing: Corbett, Marilyn

Naming
- English translation: Large cairn
- Language of name: Gaelic

Geography
- Location: Highland, Scotland
- OS grid: NM90329094
- Topo map: OS Landranger 33, 40

Càrn Mòr is a mountain on the edge of the Rough Bounds of Knoydart in the Northwest Highlands of Scotland. At a height of 829 metres (2,720 ft) it is classified as a Corbett whilst its prominence of 613 metres (2,011 ft) means it is also classified as a Marilyn. It is located in the Glen Dessary area approximately 26 kilometres (16 mi) from Fort William.

== Geography ==
Càrn Mòr has moderate slopes on its eastern to southeastern side which become steep in a few places but are generally crag free. On the west to northwestern side however the hill is steep and craggy and therefore more characteristic of its neighbours in the Rough Bounds of Knoydart.

== Ascents ==
Càrn Mòr can be climbed from Strathan in the east via its east ridge, an approach which avoids the most difficult terrain found on the western side.
