= Beinn Bheag =

Mountain in Highland, Scotland

Coordinates: 56.717°N 5.410°W

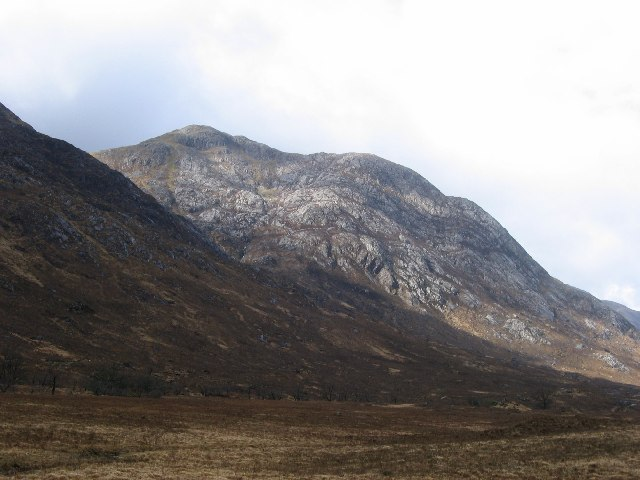
- Beinn Bheag

Highest point
- Elevation: 736 m (2,415 ft)
- Prominence: 200 m (660 ft)
- Listing: Graham, Marilyn

Geography
- Location: Lochaber, Scotland
- Parent range: Northwest Highlands
- OS grid: NM914636
- Topo map: OS Landranger 40

Beinn Bheag (736 m) is a mountain in the Northwest Highlands of Scotland. It lies in the Ardgour area of Lochaber, west of the village of Corran.

The peak is one of three that forms an east facing horseshoe, along with Garbh Bheinn and Sgorr Mhic Eacharna. It is usually climbed from the A861 road.
