= Meall Dubh =

Mountain in Highland, Scotland

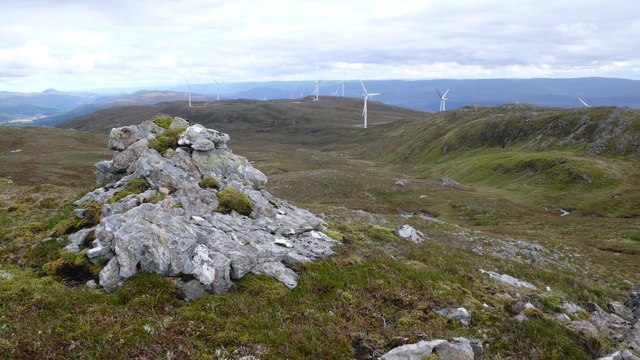
- Meall Dubh summit

Highest point
- Elevation: 789 m (2,589 ft)
- Prominence: 544 m (1,785 ft)
- Listing: Corbett, Marilyn
- Coordinates: 57°07′41″N 4°54′02″W

Geography
- Location: Highland, Scotland
- Parent range: Northwest Highlands
- OS grid: NH245078
- Topo map: OS Landranger 34

Meall Dubh (789 m) is a mountain in the Northwest Highlands, Scotland. Lying near the village of Fort Augustus, it is the highest peak between the valleys of Glen Moriston and Glen Garry.

Surrounded by moorland, a wind farm has been constructed on its slopes. The easiest route to the summit of Meall Dubh is from its northern Glen Moriston side
