= List of mountains of the British Isles by height (2001–2500) =

Highest mountains in Great Britain ("Simms" classification)
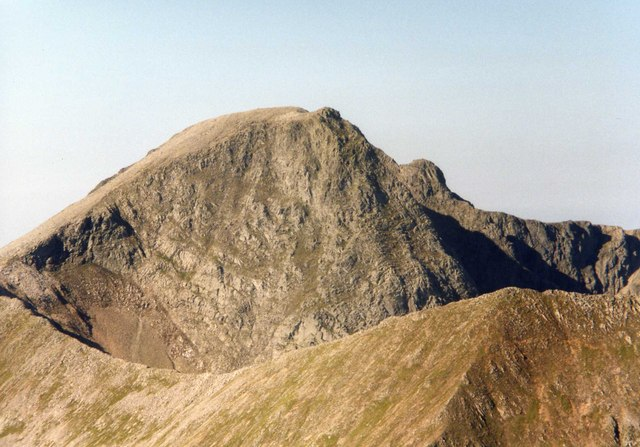
- Ben Nevis, in the Scottish Highlands, is the highest mountain in The British Isles

Highest point
- Elevation: over 600 m (1,969 ft)
- Prominence: over 30 m (98 ft)

Geography
- Location: 2,756 British Isles: 2,192 Scotland; 223 Ireland (Note: As of October 2018, the Irish MountainViews Online Database, list the prominence of Knockbrinnea (W) as 29m, and Carrignabinnia as 27 m, and thus they do not qualify as Irish Arderins, which means that MountainViews does not classify these two peaks as Simms; the total number of Irish Arderins over 600 m is thus 222. The DoBIH however uses the Harvey Tables which list the prominence for both at 30 m, and thus the DoBIH class them as Irish Simms, giving 224 Irish Simms in total.); 192 England; 150 Wales; 1 Isle of Man

This article provides access to lists of mountains in Britain and Ireland by height and by prominence. (See Lists of mountains below.) Height and prominence are the most important metrics for the classifications of mountains by the UIAA; with isolation a distant third criterion. (Note: No definition of a British Isles mountain or hill uses an explicit quantitative metric of topographic isolation (e.g. distance to the next point of equal height), however, the concept of isolation is embedded in the qualitative definition of a Scottish Munro, from the Scottish Mountaineering Club requirement of "sufficient separation" (instead of prominence).) The list is sourced from the Database of British and Irish Hills ("DoBIH") (Note: The Database of British and Irish Hills ("DoBIH") is the most referenced database for the classification of peaks in the British Isles, and the DoBIH is licensed under a "Creative Commons Attribution 3.0 Unported License".) for peaks that meet the consensus height threshold for a mountain, namely 600 metres (1,969 ft); the list also rules out peaks with a prominence below 30 metres (98 ft) and thus, the list is therefore precisely a list of the 2,756 (Note: Some sites list 2753 Simms, however, the Database of British and Irish Hills ("DoBIH") has added an extra Irish Simm, Knockbrinnea (W), bringing the total as at October 2022 to 2756.) Simms in the British Isles (as at October 2022). Many classifications of mountains in the British Isles consider a prominence between 30–150 metres (98–492 ft) as being a "top", and not a mountain; however, using the 30 metres (98 ft) prominence threshold gives the broadest possible list of mountains. For a ranking of mountains with a higher prominence threshold use:

- List of Marilyns in the British Isles, for ranking by height and by prominence, of peaks with prominence over 150 metres (492 ft); or
- List of P600 mountains in the British Isles, for ranking by height and by prominence, of peaks with prominence over 600 metres (1,969 ft)

== Coverage of Simms ==
Despite using the lower threshold for prominence of 30 metres (98 ft), the UIAA threshold for an "independent" peak, one Scottish Munro is missing, namely Maoile Lunndaidh whose official prominence changed to 11 metres (36 ft) in 2014; (Note: 281 of the 282 Scottish Munros have an official OSI prominence above 30 m, except Maoile Lunndaidh, who was found in a 2014 survey to be lower than nearby Creag Toll a' Choin. Thus, Maoile Lunndaidh had its official prominence downgraded from 400 m to just under 11 m, and the 400 m of prominence given to Creag Toll a' Choin. Note that Creag Toll a' Choin had previously been a Munro until older surveys downgraded its status in favour of Maoile Lunndaidh.) (Note: There is no known "composite" list of British Isles mountains that merges the Munro definition with other defined lists; the closest defined lists that include almost all Munros, are those that reduce the minimum prominence threshold to 30 metres (98 ft).) As of October 2018, the list of 2,754 British Isles Simms contained:

1. 281 of the 282 Munros, and 158 of the 226 Munro Tops;
2. All 222 Corbetts, all 219 Grahams, and all 118 Scottish New Donalds;
3. 872 of the 2,011 British Isles Marilyns;
4. All 524 of the England, Wales, and Ireland Hewitts;
5. 117 of the 541 Lake District Birketts (of which 99 are Wainwrights), that meet the Simms criteria;
6. All 224 of the 407 Irish Arderins with a height above 600.0 m;
7. All of the 120 P600 ("major") mountains in the British Isles;
8. 33 of the 34 England, Wales and Ireland Furths. (Note: 33 of the 34 SMC Furths have a prominence above 30 metres (98 feet), however, Caher West Top in Ireland, has a prominence of 24 metres (79 feet).)

== Simms by height by prominence ==
This list was downloaded from the DoBIH in October 2018, and includes all British and Irish peaks with a prominence below 30 metres (98 ft). Note that topographical prominence is complex to measure and requires a survey of the entire contours of a peak, rather than a single point of height. These tables are therefore subject to being revised over time, and should not be amended or updated unless the entire DoBIH data is re-downloaded again. The default table ranking is by height, so where the table is sorted by for example Region, the table will list the mountains within each Region by order of height.

Regional Top: The highest mountain in England, Wales, Scotland, Ireland, or the Isle of Man

== Lists of mountains ==
- List of mountains of the British Isles by height (1–500)
- List of mountains of the British Isles by height (501–1000)
- List of mountains of the British Isles by height (1001–1500)
- List of mountains of the British Isles by height (1501–2000)
- List of mountains of the British Isles by height (2001–2500)
- List of mountains of the British Isles by height (2501–3000)

Britain and Ireland mountains ranked by height and by prominence, Simms classification (DoBIH, October 2018)
Height Total	Prom. Total	Region	Height Region	Prom. Region	Name	Height (m)	Prom. (m)	Height (ft)	Prom. (ft)	Map Sec.	Topo Map	OS Grid Reference	Classification (§ DoBIH codes)
2001	1485	Scotland	1679	1150	Beinn a' Chliabhain	675	80	2,215	262	20C	62 69	[55.61740770838;-5.2251976969541 NR970407]	Sim
2002	2109	Scotland	1680	1650	Meall Gorm	675	47	2,215	154	13B	24	[57.509875738337;-5.5525605099635 NG873522]	Sim
2003	2332	Scotland	1681	1831	Coille Mhor	675	39	2,215	128	09B	26 35	[57.261054654002;-4.2630209268582 NH636212]	Sim
2004	1697	England	119	113	Westernhope Moor	675	67	2,215	220	35A	91 92	[54.687486590457;-2.1209607127533 NY923325]	Sim,Hew,N
2005	1347	England	120	90	Sheffield Pike	675	91	2,215	299	34C	90	[54.554190810985;-2.9771348630239 NY369181]	Sim,Hew,N,sHu,W,B,Sy,Fel
2006	1576	England	121	104	Murton Fell	675	74	2,215	243	35A	91	[54.615942834127;-2.3839882660425 NY753246]	Sim,Hew,N
2007	876	England	122	56	Lovely Seat	675	149	2,214	489	35A	98	[54.350393237313;-2.1876591295515 SD879950]	Hu,Sim,Hew,N,sMa
2008	452	Ireland	122	66	An Bheann Mhor	675	290	2,214	951	50B	83 84	[51.849726848761;-10.042615891972 V593683]	Ma,Sim,Hew,Dil,A,VL
2009	879	Scotland	1682	663	Meall Cala	674	149	2,211	489	01C	57	[56.28322751206;-4.4117075976682 NN508127]	Hu,Sim,sMa
2010	899	Scotland	1683	676	Beinn Eilde	674	146	2,211	479	04B	42	[56.933909880187;-4.3631559428737 NN563850]	Hu,Sim,sMa
2011	1901	Scotland	1684	1480	Meall na Sroine	674	56	2,211	184	10D	33 40	[56.987778134854;-5.4482753965279 NM906938]	Sim
2012	2742	Scotland	1685	2179	A' Phoit	674	30	2,211	98	13B	24	[57.444972592802;-5.6529734193206 NG809453]	Sim
2013	764	Wales	84	50	Moel Cynghorion	674	176	2,211	577	30B	115	[53.085138074037;-4.1126549269046 SH586563]	Ma,Sim,Hew,N
2014	1083	Scotland	1686	829	Curleywee	674	119	2,211	390	27B	77	[55.062439407465;-4.422285543591 NX454769]	Hu,Sim,D
2015	172	Ireland	123	35	Croaghgorm	674	522	2,211	1,713	45C	11	[54.753426084089;-8.0815096769423 G948895]	Ma,Sim,Hew,Dil,A,VL
2016	1136	Scotland	1687	869	Geal Charn	674	112	2,211	367	21A	37	[57.183302584327;-3.1861087520808 NJ284109]	Hu,Sim
2017	613	Scotland	1688	461	Creag Each	674	218	2,210	715	01A	51	[56.409634306005;-4.1862731753315 NN652263]	Ma,G,Sim
2018	1990	Scotland	1689	1553	Beinn Bhreac	674	52	2,210	171	11A	25 33	[57.267822282268;-5.3649257048283 NG972247]	Sim
2019	494	Scotland	1690	364	Carn na Coinnich	673	265	2,209	869	12A	26	[57.518049306935;-4.7999802986176 NH324510]	Ma,G,Sim
2020	1531	Scotland	1691	1188	Carn Dearg	673	77	2,208	253	13B	24	[57.441869288696;-5.6976818217392 NG782451]	Sim
2021	2110	Scotland	1692	1651	An Coileach	673	47	2,208	154	17B	24 32	[57.297680148775;-6.1133763059728 NG523305]	Sim
2022	2085	England	123	143	Killhope Law	673	48	2,208	157	35A	86 87	[54.797750933159;-2.2830532356645 NY819448]	Sim,Hew,N
2023	1061	Ireland	124	115	Binn Doire Chlair	673	122	2,208	400	47B	37	[53.495853155463;-9.7863249227358 L815510]	Hu,Sim,Hew,Dil,A,VL
2024	2664	Scotland	1693	2112	Cnapan Garbh	672	31	2,205	103	06A	43	[56.956655091221;-3.6787949720669 NN980863]	Sim
2025	2506	Scotland	1694	1981	Stac nam Bodach	672	35	2,205	115	06B	43	[56.812040503096;-3.6755978187624 NN978702]	Sim
2026	689	England	124	41	Rogan's Seat	672	195	2,205	640	35A	91 92	[54.422369746272;-2.1263417122864 NY919030]	Ma,Sim,Hew,N
2027	1677	Scotland	1695	1303	Carn nan Con Ruadha	672	68	2,205	223	15B	20	[57.730354643456;-4.665179030401 NH414743]	Sim
2028	2691	Scotland	1696	2136	Carn na Guaille	672	31	2,205	102	09B	35	[57.232887068123;-4.0177244418993 NH783176]	Sim
2029	960	Scotland	1697	726	Wedder Law	672	137	2,205	449	27C	78	[55.305097014758;-3.6744900102048 NS938025]	Hu,Sim,D
2030	2743	Scotland	1698	2180	West Knowe	672	30	2,205	98	28B	79	[55.333679416111;-3.3225546621007 NT162052]	Sim,DT
2031	526	England	125	32	Great Knoutberry Hill	672	254	2,205	833	35B	98	[54.279096535159;-2.3270936999218 SD788871]	Ma,Sim,Hew,N
2032	1918	England	126	129	Scar Crags	672	55	2,205	180	34B	89 90	[54.574386070695;-3.2266826994556 NY208206]	Sim,Hew,N,W,B,Sy,Fel
2033	2063	England	127	138	Loadpot Hill	672	49	2,205	161	34C	90	[54.554303995347;-2.8426186032396 NY456180]	Sim,Hew,N,W,B,Sy,Fel
2034	1881	Wales	85	111	Ysgafell Wen	672	57	2,205	187	30B	115	[53.013532141108;-3.9898928448105 SH666481]	Sim,Hew,N
2035	131	Ireland	125	28	Slievemore	671	582	2,201	1,909	46C	22 30	[54.009050838993;-10.05994045674 F650086]	Ma,Sim,Hew,Dil,A,VL
2036	673	Scotland	1699	506	An Ruadh-mheallan	671	200	2,201	656	13A	19 24	[57.590597014441;-5.6223774476764 NG836614]	Ma,G,Sim
2037	2744	Scotland	1700	2181	Carn Leachter Beag	671	30	2,201	98	09B	35	[57.262899933955;-4.0508723955912 NH764210]	Sim
2038	2745	Scotland	1701	2182	Mullach Coire nan Geur-oirean West Top	671	30	2,201	98	10D	41	[56.950308354191;-5.2358908131819 NN033890]	Sim
2039	806	Wales	86	53	Esgeiriau Gwynion	671	166	2,201	545	30E	124 125	[52.798482909281;-3.6492732099827 SH889236]	Ma,Sim,Hew,N
2040	701	Ireland	126	88	Lavagh More	671	193	2,201	633	45C	11	[54.766885174853;-8.1017333258888 G935910]	Ma,Sim,Hew,Dil,A,VL
2041	442	Scotland	1702	327	Cat Law	671	296	2,201	971	07A	44	[56.735641990904;-3.1163902401037 NO318610]	Ma,G,Sim
2042	2613	Scotland	1703	2068	Ben Killilan North Top	671	32	2,201	106	12B	25	[57.338387400262;-5.3481096337272 NG986325]	Sim
2043	1552	Scotland	1704	1204	Meall a' Bhogair Mor	671	76	2,201	249	12A	26	[57.528140012167;-4.790730322716 NH330521]	Sim
2044	1257	Scotland	1705	961	Meall Reamhar	671	99	2,200	325	01C	51	[56.392828853618;-4.3197942246586 NN569247]	Sim,sHu
2045	841	Ireland	127	101	Slieve Muck	670	156	2,199	512	43B	29	[54.157171009738;-6.039834560783 J281249]	Ma,Sim,Hew,Dil,A,VL
2046	1991	Scotland	1706	1554	Meall Doire Fheara	670	52	2,199	171	12A	26	[57.530201000765;-4.8192909609778 NH313524]	Sim
2047	1363	Scotland	1707	1050	Meall nan Damh	670	90	2,198	295	12A	26	[57.529880102459;-4.7524365200678 NH353522]	Sim,sHu
2048	1079	Wales	87	63	Waun-oer	670	120	2,198	394	30F	124	[52.716271937522;-3.8001447365004 SH785147]	Hu,Sim,Hew,N
2049	480	Ireland	128	69	Slievanea NE Top	670	273	2,198	896	49B	70	[52.188970859699;-10.172198941325 Q515063]	Ma,Sim,Hew,Dil,A,VL
2050	2095	Scotland	1708	1637	Andrew Gannel Hill	670	47	2,198	155	26A	58	[56.185694772198;-3.7448755799084 NN918006]	Sim,DT
2051	2190	Scotland	1709	1718	An Stuchd	669	44	2,195	144	01C	57	[56.29922119587;-4.5113173568532 NN447147]	Sim
2052	1806	Scotland	1710	1407	Meall Reamhar	669	61	2,195	200	01A	52	[56.472070741055;-3.8261816962112 NN876326]	Sim
2053	744	Scotland	1711	561	Hartaval	669	180	2,195	591	17A	23	[57.515708229626;-6.209786134445 NG480551]	Ma,G,Sim
2054	2590	Wales	88	146	Ysgafell Wen North Top	669	33	2,195	108	30B	115	[53.017050725366;-3.9945274221227 SH663485]	Sim,Hew,N
2055	397	Wales	89	23	Carnedd y Filiast	669	316	2,195	1,037	30D	124 125	[52.985905059634;-3.6832207636544 SH871445]	Ma,Sim,Hew,N
2056	1294	Scotland	1712	993	Drumelzier Law	668	95	2,192	312	28B	72	[55.567013926391;-3.3510016424414 NT149312]	Sim,D,sHu
2057	554	England	128	33	Fountains Fell	668	243	2,192	797	35B	98	[54.139155385108;-2.2096610281644 SD864715]	Ma,Sim,Hew,N
2058	580	England	129	35	Dodd Fell Hill	668	232	2,192	761	35B	98	[54.255923382456;-2.2455575406227 SD841845]	Ma,Sim,Hew,N
2059	2507	Scotland	1713	1982	Round Hill	668	35	2,192	115	21A	37	[57.288704428958;-3.1546572472343 NJ305226]	Sim
2060	688	Scotland	1714	519	Beinn Bheag	668	196	2,192	643	14B	19	[57.691526622525;-5.2144805168743 NH085714]	Ma,G,Sim
2061	1364	Scotland	1715	1051	Sgorr nan Cearc	668	90	2,192	295	18B	40	[56.838562558983;-5.4476516355344 NM898772]	Sim,sHu
2062	1441	Scotland	1716	1109	Creag Ruadh	668	83	2,192	272	15B	20	[57.796626652541;-4.6330408589058 NH436816]	Sim
2063	1609	Scotland	1717	1248	Mullach Li	668	72	2,192	236	10B	33	[57.096624393897;-5.6053849934241 NG817064]	Sim
2064	1097	Scotland	1718	837	Gana Hill	668	117	2,192	384	27C	78	[55.291966913821;-3.648738361185 NS954010]	Hu,Sim,D
2065	863	Ireland	129	103	Knocknafallia	668	152	2,192	499	54A	74	[52.219671544194;-7.8690410309095 S090075]	Ma,Sim,Hew,A,VL
2066	827	Scotland	1719	623	Creag Bhalg	668	159	2,192	522	08B	43	[57.00297415448;-3.4981210634427 NO091912]	Ma,G,Sim
2067	2655	Scotland	1720	2103	Carn Dallaig West Top	667	32	2,189	104	06B	43	[56.861074351976;-3.6367834885533 NO003756]	Sim
2068	462	Scotland	1721	339	Binnein Shios	667	282	2,189	925	04B	34 42	[56.937933767822;-4.4801316267133 NN492857]	Ma,G,Sim
2069	207	Ireland	130	40	Muckish	667	481	2,189	1,578	45B	02	[55.105571516487;-7.9944861036824 C004287]	Ma,Sim,Hew,Dil,A,VL
2070	1971	Scotland	1722	1537	Din Law	667	53	2,188	174	28B	78	[55.427337552079;-3.385732558873 NT124157]	Sim,DT
2071	749	Wales	90	49	Cyrniau Nod	667	179	2,188	587	30E	125	[52.839073979424;-3.5038282129792 SH988279]	Ma,Sim,Hew,N
2072	2064	England	130	139	Little Fell	667	49	2,188	161	35A	98	[54.369046427716;-2.2970252534752 SD808971]	Sim,Hew,N
2073	781	Scotland	1723	587	Meall nan Eun	667	172	2,188	564	10B	33	[57.089863591288;-5.46271050339 NG903052]	Ma,G,Sim
2074	833	Scotland	1724	628	Beinn Bhreac	667	158	2,188	518	15A	20	[57.851552196153;-4.9927237299166 NH225886]	Ma,G,Sim
2075	2508	Scotland	1725	1983	Carn a' Choin Deirg South Top	667	35	2,188	115	15A	20	[57.883209631319;-4.7034773981633 NH398914]	Sim
2076	225	Wales	91	14	Tarren y Gesail	667	463	2,188	1,519	30F	124	[52.634571142808;-3.9076227859432 SH710058]	Ma,Sim,Hew,N
2077	926	Ireland	131	106	An Corran	667	142	2,188	466	50B	78	[51.90073072992;-9.8952685307421 V696737]	Hu,Sim,Hew,Dil,A,VL,sMa
2078	996	Ireland	132	111	Beenmore	667	132	2,188	433	50A	83	[52.015060750801;-10.045767950739 V596867]	Hu,Sim,Hew,Dil,A,VL
2079	385	Ireland	133	58	Binn Bhriocain	667	320	2,188	1,050	47C	37	[53.533558980565;-9.7275796101195 L855551]	Ma,Sim,Hew,Dil,A,VL
2080	384	Scotland	1726	285	Beinn Gaire	666	321	2,185	1,053	18A	40	[56.811607415543;-5.6369466180463 NM781748]	Ma,G,Sim
2081	2267	Scotland	1727	1781	Meall nan Eun West Top	666	41	2,185	135	10B	33	[57.088784541016;-5.4692148870135 NG899051]	Sim
2082	2645	Scotland	1728	2094	Creachan an Fhiodha	666	32	2,185	105	15B	20	[57.80934877478;-4.5380067076714 NH493828]	Sim
2083	1147	Ireland	134	119	Coomura Mountain	666	110	2,185	361	50B	78 83	[51.912858140999;-9.9233935321566 V677751]	Hu,Sim,Hew,Dil,A,VL
2084	117	Ireland	135	24	Cuilcagh	666	605	2,185	1,985	45D	26	[54.200834186505;-7.8122735019581 H123280]	Ma,Sim,Hew,Dil,A,VL,CoH,CoU
2085	1044	Scotland	1729	796	Parlan Hill	666	125	2,185	410	01C	50 56	[56.316690804226;-4.664483523987 NN353170]	Hu,Sim
2086	380	Scotland	1730	281	Uamh Bheag	666	325	2,184	1,066	26B	57	[56.280550537686;-4.1158938994021 NN691118]	Ma,G,Sim,D
2087	1822	Wales	92	105	Post Gwyn	665	60	2,182	197	30E	125	[52.852732474275;-3.4166782525797 SJ047293]	Sim,Hew,N
2088	1031	Scotland	1731	784	Meall a' Choire Chreagaich	665	127	2,182	417	01A	51 52	[56.552594456738;-3.9667254439138 NN792418]	Hu,Sim
2089	1211	Scotland	1732	927	Liath Bheinn	665	104	2,182	341	08B	36	[57.193071714803;-3.3734198011422 NJ171122]	Hu,Sim
2090	614	Scotland	1733	462	Beinn Mheadhoin	665	218	2,182	715	12A	25	[57.485954134045;-4.9076608146178 NH258477]	Ma,G,Sim
2091	1944	Scotland	1734	1514	Diollaid Bheag	665	54	2,182	177	18A	40	[56.86144400415;-5.5925481840305 NM811802]	Sim
2092	2717	Scotland	1735	2159	Beinn na Caillich North Top	665	31	2,182	100	10B	33	[57.101755228564;-5.6455309276795 NG793071]	Sim
2093	1365	Scotland	1736	1052	Wind Fell	665	90	2,182	295	28B	79	[55.342034810551;-3.2976041883346 NT178061]	Sim,D,sHu
2094	1366	Ireland	136	145	Mullaghnarakill	665	90	2,182	295	50A	78 83	[51.999893463521;-10.039251378925 V600850]	Sim,Hew,Dil,A,VL,sHu
2095	515	Scotland	1737	378	Meall Tairbh	665	257	2,182	843	03C	50	[56.496946985591;-4.8444913120966 NN250375]	Ma,G,Sim
2096	1234	Scotland	1738	943	Bodesbeck Law	664	101	2,179	332	28B	79	[55.380511326824;-3.3130689019269 NT169104]	Hu,Sim,D
2097	2297	Ireland	137	204	Croaghaun SW Top	664	40	2,178	131	46C	22 30	[53.981289381714;-10.206450707512 F553058]	Sim,Hew,A,VL
2098	1023	Scotland	1739	777	Beinn Liath Bheag	664	128	2,178	420	14B	20	[57.717711428735;-4.9514284248321 NH243736]	Hu,Sim
2099	818	England	131	50	Tarn Crag (Sleddale)	664	160	2,178	525	34C	90	[54.462981051993;-2.7913731786909 NY488078]	Ma,Sim,Hew,N,W,B,Sy,Fel
2100	1380	England	132	93	Black Fell	664	89	2,178	292	35A	86	[54.793244187377;-2.5489693664417 NY648444]	Sim,Hew,N
2101	642	Ireland	138	80	Croaghanmoira	664	209	2,178	686	55A	62	[52.918422071701;-6.3668634225933 T099865]	Ma,Sim,Hew,Dil,A,VL
2102	694	Ireland	139	87	Binn Gabhar	664	194	2,178	636	47B	37	[53.491531117737;-9.8343614829514 L783506]	Ma,Sim,Hew,Dil,A,VL
2103	186	Scotland	1740	130	Beinn Ruadh	664	501	2,178	1,644	19C	56	[56.052788933386;-4.9642865302902 NS155884]	Ma,G,Sim
2104	2465	Scotland	1741	1946	Round Hill	664	36	2,178	118	07B	44	[56.944686372655;-2.9319541684884 NO434841]	Sim
2105	1299	Scotland	1742	998	Carn nan Earb	663	94	2,176	309	11B	34	[57.233685166158;-4.8164960770843 NH301194]	Sim,sHu
2106	1807	Scotland	1743	1408	Meall na Cloiche	663	61	2,175	200	01A	51	[56.420391062377;-4.2874211919162 NN590277]	Sim
2107	772	Wales	93	51	Fan Nedd	663	174	2,175	571	32A	160	[51.853571494664;-3.5796431379819 SN913184]	Ma,Sim,Hew,N
2108	2298	Wales	94	134	Mynydd Llysiau	663	40	2,175	131	32A	161	[51.943924971372;-3.1550777739287 SO207279]	Sim,Hew,N
2109	1787	Scotland	1744	1395	Creag an Loch	663	62	2,175	203	01A	52	[56.544851372025;-3.8264321727002 NN878407]	Sim
2110	398	Scotland	1745	295	Aodann Chleireig	663	316	2,175	1,037	10D	40	[56.890339260792;-5.294751582356 NM994825]	Ma,G,Sim
2111	455	Scotland	1746	334	Sgorr a' Choise	663	288	2,175	945	03B	41	[56.648364651983;-5.1267405634225 NN084551]	Ma,G,Sim
2112	595	Scotland	1747	446	Croit Bheinn	663	227	2,175	745	18A	40	[56.835396122312;-5.591690309032 NM810773]	Ma,G,Sim
2113	1517	Scotland	1748	1177	Creag a' Choire Dhuibh	663	78	2,175	256	11A	25	[57.338501653808;-4.8710584101235 NH273312]	Sim
2114	1577	Scotland	1749	1226	Meall Giubhais	663	74	2,175	243	12A	26	[57.514687956287;-4.8297837130081 NH306507]	Sim
2115	2086	Scotland	1750	1630	Beinn an Eoin	663	48	2,175	157	10C	34	[57.138155062153;-4.9067617595119 NH242090]	Sim
2116	2369	Scotland	1751	1866	Sgurr Finnisg-aig	663	38	2,175	125	04A	41	[56.841845616727;-4.9706590353622 NN189762]	Sim
2117	1856	Scotland	1752	1448	Scaw'd Law	663	58	2,175	190	27C	78	[55.315527025629;-3.7001433093507 NS922037]	Sim,D
2118	1348	England	133	91	Carrock Fell	663	91	2,175	299	34A	90	[54.693105284007;-3.0239122671603 NY341336]	Sim,Hew,N,sHu,W,B,Sy,Fel
2119	2370	Ireland	140	206	Camenabologue SE Top	663	38	2,175	125	55A	56	[52.99871707344;-6.4576753364072 T036953]	Sim,Hew,Dil,A,VL
2120	1823	Ireland	141	175	Stumpa Duloigh SW Top	663	60	2,175	197	50B	78	[51.949298872331;-9.7780419735077 V778789]	Sim,Hew,Dil,A,VL
2121	2087	Scotland	1753	1631	Burnt Hill	663	48	2,175	157	07B	44	[56.888786098076;-2.9584638470923 NO417779]	Sim
2122	1089	Ireland	142	116	Sugarloaf Hill	663	118	2,174	387	54A	74	[52.245792379224;-7.9436305121161 S039104]	Hu,Sim,Hew,Dil,A,VL
2123	1564	Scotland	1754	1215	Druim nan Firean	662	75	2,173	246	10A	33	[57.155365448004;-5.4671819235055 NG904125]	Sim
2124	2088	Scotland	1755	1632	Sgor a' Chleirich	662	48	2,173	157	16B	10	[58.401372652084;-4.4520778892333 NC568485]	Sim
2125	1972	Scotland	1756	1538	Meall Reamhar	662	53	2,172	174	01B	51 57	[56.36236540548;-4.1657568280914 NN663210]	Sim
2126	269	Scotland	1757	200	Oireabhal	662	419	2,172	1,375	24B	13 14	[57.982318769734;-6.9367128030625 NB083099]	Ma,G,Sim
2127	2299	Scotland	1758	1806	Creag Mhor	662	40	2,172	131	09B	35	[57.099596069985;-4.0913700032612 NH734029]	Sim
2128	2466	Scotland	1759	1947	Stob Coire Easain West Top	662	36	2,172	118	04A	41	[56.824138668933;-4.8036955257512 NN290738]	Sim
2129	2509	Scotland	1760	1984	Sgurr Dubh South Top	662	35	2,172	115	13B	25	[57.541406137744;-5.3867867327537 NG974552]	Sim
2130	949	Wales	95	58	Dduallt	662	138	2,172	453	30D	124 125	[52.83004195676;-3.7677358502196 SH810273]	Hu,Sim,Hew,N
2131	836	England	134	53	Nine Standards Rigg	662	157	2,172	515	35A	91 92	[54.449091748517;-2.2713879114678 NY825060]	Ma,Sim,Hew,N
2132	2191	Scotland	1761	1719	Creag na Cathaig	662	44	2,172	144	03B	50	[56.541470514787;-5.1943910967525 NN037434]	Sim
2133	1953	Scotland	1762	1521	Creagan Caise Hill	662	54	2,172	176	07A	43	[56.804386108645;-3.3427938962644 NO181689]	Sim
2134	2722	Scotland	1763	2164	Meall an Lochain	662	30	2,171	99	01C	51	[56.382060376995;-4.4130929108712 NN511237]	Sim
2135	1788	Scotland	1764	1396	Birkscairn Hill	661	62	2,169	203	28B	73	[55.58610697214;-3.1533365633143 NT274331]	Sim,D
2136	1610	Scotland	1765	1249	Beinn Fuath	661	72	2,169	236	01B	51 57	[56.370331093507;-4.1208685515207 NN691218]	Sim
2137	1737	Scotland	1766	1352	Creag nan Calman	661	65	2,169	213	11B	25	[57.239653435731;-4.9860312643365 NH199205]	Sim
2138	1992	Scotland	1767	1555	Stob an Uillt-fhearna	661	52	2,169	171	10B	33	[57.054861597781;-5.6194797601768 NG806018]	Sim
2139	2591	Scotland	1768	2050	Caimhlin Mor	661	33	2,169	108	09B	35	[57.203217783771;-4.1800084411895 NH684146]	Sim
2140	491	Wales	96	31	Manod Mawr	661	266	2,169	873	30D	124	[52.983502340369;-3.9021090185277 SH724446]	Ma,Sim,Hew,N
2141	1220	Wales	97	71	Craig-las	661	103	2,169	338	30F	124	[52.702956142815;-3.9594487754185 SH677135]	Hu,Sim,Hew,N
2142	278	Ireland	143	43	Binn Mhor	661	408	2,169	1,339	47C	44	[53.482802955052;-9.6306086277859 L918493]	Ma,Sim,Hew,Dil,A,VL
2143	1161	Scotland	1769	887	Sgurr a' Choinnich	661	109	2,169	358	19C	56	[56.11754533086;-4.9628319440312 NS159956]	Hu,Sim
2144	964	Scotland	1770	730	Ben Reoch	660	136	2,166	447	01E	56	[56.18049406095;-4.7275527932685 NN308020]	Hu,Sim
2145	317	Wales	98	19	Great Rhos	660	379	2,165	1,243	31B	148	[52.266252238232;-3.2000733759081 SO182638]	Ma,Sim,Hew,N,CoH
2146	1442	Scotland	1771	1110	Suidhe Fhearghas	660	83	2,165	272	20C	62 69	[55.657545829733;-5.2030567866046 NR986451]	Sim
2147	1228	Scotland	1772	939	Meall Tarsuinn	660	102	2,165	335	10C	34	[57.018646175356;-5.0193608412 NN168960]	Hu,Sim
2148	2592	Scotland	1773	2051	Meith Bheinn West Top	660	33	2,165	108	10D	40	[56.921750044274;-5.5901281021258 NM816869]	Sim
2149	2467	England	135	170	Whiteless Pike	660	36	2,165	118	34B	89 90	[54.558665460661;-3.2695103197205 NY180189]	Sim,Hew,N,W,B,Sy,Fel
2150	2715	Scotland	1774	2157	Caerloch Dhu	659	31	2,163	100	27B	77	[55.196286323578;-4.5152634703336 NX400920]	Sim,DT
2151	230	Scotland	1775	165	Windlestraw Law	659	461	2,163	1,512	28A	73	[55.676398151289;-3.0017444119347 NT371430]	Ma,G,Sim,D
2152	1295	Scotland	1776	994	Ulabhal	659	95	2,162	312	24B	13 14	[57.995872548315;-6.9351938705448 NB085114]	Sim,sHu
2153	534	Scotland	1777	394	Carn Glas-choire	659	251	2,162	823	09A	35 36	[57.338881429754;-3.8440803233648 NH891291]	Ma,G,Sim,CoH
2154	1751	Scotland	1778	1364	Cnoc an t-Sidhein Mor	659	64	2,162	210	15B	21	[57.770455491188;-4.3654295934423 NH594781]	Sim
2155	2043	Scotland	1779	1596	Meall a' Bhuailt	659	50	2,162	164	09B	35	[57.219115439251;-4.344927726276 NH585167]	Sim
2156	1201	Scotland	1780	920	Cairnsgarroch	659	105	2,162	344	27B	77	[55.193592173467;-4.33439587852 NX515913]	Hu,Sim,D
2157	2510	Ireland	144	212	Binn idir an Da Log SE Top	659	35	2,162	115	47C	37	[53.511022495889;-9.6693785026994 L893525]	Sim,Hew,A,VL
2158	2268	Scotland	1781	1782	Maol an Fhithich	659	41	2,162	135	01C	50 56	[56.288730741184;-4.6690011417402 NN349139]	Sim
2159	1451	Scotland	1782	1119	Moss Hill	659	82	2,162	269	21A	37	[57.24215412941;-3.1366310665851 NJ315174]	Sim
2160	2342	Scotland	1783	1840	Creag Each West Top	659	39	2,161	126	01A	51	[56.41038902307;-4.1944215597508 NN647264]	Sim
2161	1318	Wales	99	75	Cribin Fawr	659	93	2,161	305	30F	124	[52.720966044966;-3.7870117495659 SH794152]	Sim,Hew,N,sHu
2162	873	Scotland	1784	659	Stob na Boine Druim-fhinn	658	150	2,160	491	19C	56	[56.179802002967;-4.9531254081899 NN168025]	Hu,Sim,sMa,xG
2163	447	Scotland	1785	330	Creag Mhor	658	293	2,159	961	01C	57	[56.335352738134;-4.4117604927331 NN510185]	Ma,G,Sim
2164	367	Scotland	1786	270	Creag Dhubh	658	332	2,159	1,089	09C	34 41	[56.902472833178;-4.7570041296773 NN322824]	Ma,G,Sim
2165	682	Scotland	1787	515	Creag Ruadh	658	197	2,159	646	05B	42	[56.966263120128;-4.1644988067489 NN685882]	Ma,G,Sim
2166	807	Scotland	1788	607	Meall nan Eagan	658	166	2,159	545	04B	42	[56.956465047278;-4.3103077655994 NN596874]	Ma,G,Sim
2167	1634	Scotland	1789	1268	Carn Fliuch-bhaid	658	71	2,159	233	09B	35	[57.183017808875;-4.4005577808108 NH550128]	Sim
2168	1738	Wales	100	99	Manod Mawr North Top	658	65	2,159	213	30D	115	[52.994354830861;-3.8981158624703 SH727458]	Sim,Hew,N
2169	1658	England	136	111	High Pike (Caldbeck)	658	69	2,159	226	34A	90	[54.705377626849;-3.0599164788411 NY318350]	Sim,Hew,N,W,B,Sy,Fel
2170	371	Ireland	145	56	Knockowen	658	330	2,159	1,083	51A	84	[51.737946304482;-9.7263020621319 V808553]	Ma,Sim,Hew,Dil,A,VL
2171	2340	Scotland	1790	1838	Carabad	657	39	2,156	127	02A	42 51	[56.631654190128;-4.4714059813174 NN485516]	Sim
2172	1452	Scotland	1791	1120	Carn Dearg Mor	657	82	2,156	269	06A	43	[56.835113047246;-3.8848039129636 NN851731]	Sim
2173	1659	Scotland	1792	1287	Meall Dearg	657	69	2,156	226	16F	15	[58.028694799166;-5.137970286335 NC148087]	Sim
2174	2646	Scotland	1793	2095	Sgurr na h-Eige	657	32	2,156	105	11A	25 33	[57.296412932124;-5.2347015408425 NH052275]	Sim
2175	535	Scotland	1794	395	Millfore	657	250	2,156	820	27B	77	[55.049713507936;-4.3839417228601 NX478754]	Ma,G,Sim,D
2176	2371	Scotland	1795	1867	Knee of Cairnsmore	657	38	2,156	125	27B	83	[54.962662566362;-4.3303524309478 NX509656]	Sim,DT
2177	504	England	137	30	Place Fell	657	262	2,156	860	34C	90	[54.543844809032;-2.9212385739297 NY405169]	Ma,Sim,Hew,N,W,B,Sy,Fel
2178	1229	Ireland	146	131	Mullacor	657	102	2,156	335	55A	56	[52.985031285685;-6.3747748337644 T092939]	Hu,Sim,Hew,Dil,A,VL
2179	1611	Ireland	147	160	Beann SW Top	657	72	2,156	236	50B	78	[51.921900450811;-9.8641791452227 V718760]	Sim,Hew,Dil,A,VL
2180	257	Scotland	1796	191	Mid Hill	657	430	2,156	1,411	01E	56	[56.128902391627;-4.702975282102 NS321962]	Ma,G,Sim
2181	1137	Scotland	1797	870	Creachan Mor	657	112	2,156	367	19C	56	[56.082687281733;-4.9167491664426 NS186916]	Hu,Sim
2182	2240	Scotland	1798	1758	Creag an Leinibh	657	42	2,156	138	01E	56	[56.08992423468;-4.7179279697906 NS310919]	Sim
2183	1857	Scotland	1799	1449	Fox Cairn	657	58	2,156	190	08B	37	[57.109688801582;-3.1804528862427 NJ286027]	Sim
2184	2619	Ireland	148	219	Mount Leinster East Top	657	32	2,154	106	54B	68	[52.619378961092;-6.7545544433473 S844527]	Sim,Hew,A,VL
2185	733	Scotland	1800	552	Meall Odhar	656	183	2,152	600	01D	50	[56.429574906493;-4.7632152406861 NN297298]	Ma,G,Sim
2186	2300	England	138	155	Grey Nag	656	40	2,152	131	35A	86	[54.822109656434;-2.5244591282163 NY664476]	Sim,Hew,N
2187	626	Scotland	1801	472	Meall Blair	656	213	2,152	699	10C	33	[57.00597502237;-5.1682412967038 NN077950]	Ma,G,Sim
2188	2511	Scotland	1802	1985	Creag nan Eilid	656	35	2,152	115	12B	25 33	[57.312581429808;-5.3042307649553 NH011295]	Sim
2189	2692	Scotland	1803	2137	Meall Beag	656	31	2,152	102	16F	15	[58.110157975786;-5.1145668334034 NC166177]	Sim
2190	305	Ireland	149	47	Crohane	656	388	2,152	1,273	52A	79	[51.990527233572;-9.3851404017557 W049829]	Ma,Sim,Hew,Dil,A,VL
2191	1945	Ireland	150	184	Dromderalough	656	54	2,152	177	52A	78	[51.953895672865;-9.5134741079709 V960790]	Sim,Hew,Dil,A,VL
2192	1007	Ireland	151	112	Chimney Rock Mountain	656	130	2,152	427	43B	29	[54.162218440649;-5.9125098129657 J364257]	Hu,Sim,Hew,Dil,A,VL
2193	2548	Scotland	1804	2013	Beinn Tharsuinn	656	34	2,152	112	01E	56	[56.085658924436;-4.7481715978301 NS291915]	Sim
2194	1789	Ireland	152	171	Knocknagnauv	655	62	2,149	203	54A	74	[52.22687481061;-7.8821906372934 S081083]	Sim,Hew,Dil,A,VL
2195	1660	Scotland	1805	1288	Meall a' Bhobuir	655	69	2,149	226	02A	42 51	[56.636300655457;-4.4178930290945 NN518520]	Sim
2196	2065	Scotland	1806	1615	Carn a' Bhodaich	655	49	2,149	161	21A	37	[57.341880913182;-3.2310941534061 NJ260286]	Sim
2197	1090	Wales	101	64	Moel yr Ogof	655	118	2,149	387	30B	115	[53.007981550748;-4.1536014432878 SH556478]	Hu,Sim,Hew,N
2198	2468	England	139	171	Selside Pike	655	36	2,149	118	34C	90	[54.492655287552;-2.7888587402151 NY490111]	Sim,Hew,N,W,B,Sy,Fel
2199	1858	Ireland	153	177	Cnoc na dTarbh	655	58	2,149	190	50C	78	[52.004979593038;-9.6579153365959 V862849]	Sim,Hew,Dil,A,VL
2200	1008	Scotland	1807	764	Beinn Reithe	655	130	2,149	427	19C	56	[56.146215901943;-4.852324434147 NS229985]	Hu,Sim
2201	1768	Scotland	1808	1379	Carn Loch nan Eilean	655	63	2,149	207	15A	20	[57.764624732034;-4.9048060670771 NH273787]	Sim
2202	1230	Ireland	154	132	Cove Mountain	655	102	2,148	335	43B	29	[54.174625194125;-5.9547703630415 J336270]	Hu,Sim,Hew,Dil,A,VL
2203	1722	Scotland	1809	1340	Creag an Lochain	655	66	2,148	215	02A	52	[56.68756529082;-3.8970168292557 NN839567]	Sim
2204	1666	Scotland	1810	1294	Stob an Fhainne	654	68	2,147	224	01C	50 56	[56.263016703729;-4.6526746349379 NN358110]	Sim
2205	1946	Scotland	1811	1515	Creag Chean	654	54	2,147	177	02A	42 51 52	[56.655026569616;-3.9671635168404 NN795532]	Sim
2206	1265	Scotland	1812	968	Sgorr na Ruadhraich	654	99	2,146	323	12B	26	[57.383138770898;-4.8046575926044 NH315360]	Sim,sHu
2207	1769	Scotland	1813	1380	Meallan an Laoigh	654	63	2,146	207	14A	19	[57.71509869649;-5.2417653058636 NH070741]	Sim
2208	1790	Scotland	1814	1397	Coire Ceirsle Hill	654	62	2,146	203	09C	34 41	[56.929304696126;-4.8822686768794 NN247857]	Sim
2209	2044	Scotland	1815	1597	Carn an Alltain Riabhaich	654	50	2,146	164	12A	25	[57.465056176654;-4.9560358421159 NH228455]	Sim
2210	475	England	140	28	Harter Fell (Eskdale)	654	276	2,146	906	34D	96	[54.386756896673;-3.2056791821559 SD218997]	Ma,Sim,Hew,N,W,B,Sy,Fel
2211	750	Ireland	155	93	Muckanaght	654	179	2,146	587	47B	37	[53.521690948057;-9.8597906244901 L767540]	Ma,Sim,Hew,Dil,A,VL
2212	906	Scotland	1816	682	Meall Ban	654	145	2,146	476	03B	49	[56.597143465733;-5.2659042341266 NM996498]	Hu,Sim,sMa
2213	2119	Scotland	1817	1659	Ben Glas	654	47	2,145	153	01C	50 56	[56.334325875664;-4.6802752536188 NN344190]	Sim
2214	2719	Scotland	1818	2161	Meall Donn	653	30	2,143	100	20C	62 69	[55.653266722919;-5.3299138399477 NR906450]	Sim
2215	887	England	141	59	High Spy	653	148	2,143	485	34B	89 90	[54.535253570902;-3.1853249550015 NY234162]	Hu,Sim,Hew,N,sMa,W,B,Sy,Fel
2216	1973	Scotland	1819	1539	Meall Buidhe	653	53	2,142	174	02B	50	[56.449090661339;-4.6932241128991 NN341318]	Sim
2217	2469	Scotland	1820	1948	Meall nan Sac	653	36	2,142	118	02A	42 51	[56.634949395039;-4.3476852439484 NN561517]	Sim
2218	1424	Scotland	1821	1096	Meall Chnaimhean	653	85	2,142	279	14A	19	[57.723649111974;-5.494540917711 NG920758]	Sim
2219	2269	Scotland	1822	1783	Meall a' Bhogair Beag	653	41	2,142	135	12A	26	[57.530228889439;-4.7775239943996 NH338523]	Sim
2220	2010	Wales	102	118	Mynydd Tal-y-mignedd	653	51	2,142	167	30B	115	[53.038849810164;-4.1864653241905 SH535513]	Sim,Hew,N
2221	360	Ireland	156	55	Keadeen Mountain	653	335	2,142	1,099	55A	62	[52.94995272546;-6.5829028519661 S953897]	Ma,Sim,Hew,Dil,A,VL
2222	1415	Scotland	1823	1089	Beinn Bheag	653	86	2,142	282	03C	50	[56.453588700349;-4.7341202236707 NN316324]	Sim
2223	1646	England	142	110	Comb Fell	653	70	2,141	230	33	80	[55.462083364573;-2.1217439784785 NT924187]	Sim,Hew,N
2224	741	Scotland	1824	559	Fiarach	652	181	2,140	594	01D	50	[56.398043323455;-4.6847540025617 NN344261]	Ma,G,Sim
2225	1947	Scotland	1825	1516	Hillshaw Head	652	54	2,139	177	28B	72	[55.505861498293;-3.5088274203048 NT048246]	Sim,D
2226	702	Scotland	1826	528	Beinn na Cille	652	193	2,139	633	18C	49	[56.630270881944;-5.5020148066852 NM853542]	Ma,G,Sim
2227	961	Scotland	1827	727	Beinn Tharsuinn Chaol	652	137	2,139	449	14A	19	[57.71423745912;-5.3777348663874 NG989744]	Hu,Sim
2228	1162	Scotland	1828	888	Am Meallan	652	109	2,139	358	11A	25	[57.277871543695;-5.0040622724906 NH190248]	Hu,Sim
2229	2301	Scotland	1829	1807	Carn Leachtar Dhubh	652	40	2,139	131	09B	35	[57.220272955293;-4.181014675203 NH684165]	Sim
2230	2372	Scotland	1830	1868	Cnoc Fraing South Top	652	38	2,139	125	09B	35	[57.193146147841;-3.9741786371598 NH808131]	Sim
2231	1319	Ireland	157	142	Lugduff	652	93	2,139	305	55A	56	[52.998009493803;-6.4040778732413 T072953]	Sim,Hew,Dil,A,VL,sHu
2232	399	Ireland	158	60	Knockshanahullion	652	316	2,139	1,037	54A	74	[52.245806010179;-8.0021925324132 R999104]	Ma,Sim,Hew,Dil,A,VL
2233	388	Ireland	159	59	Dooish	652	319	2,137	1,047	45B	06	[55.036403811957;-8.0289043380982 B982210]	Ma,Sim,Hew,Dil,A,VL
2234	319	Scotland	1831	236	Beinn Donachain	651	376	2,137	1,234	03C	50	[56.442048664251;-4.9247665761188 NN198316]	Ma,G,Sim
2235	463	Scotland	1832	340	Blackhope Scar	651	282	2,136	925	28A	73	[55.723251660072;-3.0921005173995 NT315483]	Ma,G,Sim,D,CoH,CoU,CoA
2236	842	Scotland	1833	634	Glas-bheinn Mhor	651	156	2,136	512	11B	26	[57.271700413645;-4.595438788934 NH436231]	Ma,G,Sim
2237	938	Scotland	1834	710	Beinn Dearg Mheadhonach	651	140	2,136	459	17B	32	[57.26678325934;-6.1232037161158 NG515271]	Hu,Sim,sMa
2238	1974	Scotland	1835	1540	Carn Uilleim	651	53	2,136	174	12A	26	[57.522867507523;-4.7853160052621 NH333515]	Sim
2239	2593	Scotland	1836	2052	Sgurr a' Chaorachain Far North Top	651	33	2,136	108	13B	24	[57.425032912001;-5.689315502763 NG786432]	Sim
2240	2746	England	143	191	Three Pikes	651	30	2,136	98	35A	91 92	[54.703448916053;-2.2575667948558 NY835343]	Sim,Hew,N
2241	2302	England	144	156	Rossett Pike	651	40	2,136	131	34B	89 90	[54.457308518562;-3.1599323917747 NY249075]	Sim,Hew,N,W,B,Sy,Fel
2242	2135	Ireland	160	194	Been Hill	651	46	2,136	151	50A	83	[52.003233114944;-10.053966652913 V590854]	Sim,Hew,Dil,A,VL
2243	2549	Scotland	1837	2014	Meall Copagach	651	34	2,136	112	03C	50	[56.44533996839;-5.1570992986595 NN055326]	Sim
2244	1279	Scotland	1838	980	Cairn of Barns	651	97	2,136	318	07A	44	[56.827285956025;-3.1158385971729 NO320712]	Sim,sHu
2245	2747	Scotland	1839	2183	Cairn Vachich	651	30	2,136	98	21A	37	[57.188454238999;-3.2110931980337 NJ269115]	Sim
2246	2281	Scotland	1840	1792	Meall an Spardain	651	40	2,134	132	10B	33	[57.050329398209;-5.3963438001506 NG941006]	Sim
2247	2169	Wales	103	127	Black Mixen	650	45	2,133	148	31B	148	[52.270953166924;-3.1796826149097 SO196643]	Sim,Hew,N
2248	2512	England	145	173	Simon Fell	650	35	2,133	115	35B	98	[54.171098106504;-2.3783221698825 SD754751]	Sim,Hew,N
2249	794	Scotland	1841	597	Sgorr Mhic Eacharna	650	168	2,133	551	18B	40	[56.712567207467;-5.3870642003565 NM928630]	Ma,G,Sim
2250	1993	Scotland	1842	1556	Carnan Ban	650	52	2,133	171	14A	19	[57.732617215788;-5.3626448082549 NG999764]	Sim
2251	1126	Scotland	1843	865	Moorbrock Hill	650	113	2,133	371	27C	77	[55.259492290542;-4.1730090455143 NX620983]	Hu,Sim,D
2252	1367	Ireland	161	146	Lavagh Beg	650	90	2,133	295	45C	11	[54.771364103446;-8.1157284164307 G926915]	Sim,Hew,Dil,A,VL,sHu
2253	2136	Scotland	1844	1672	Creag a' Chleirich	650	46	2,133	151	08B	36 43	[57.023689177538;-3.4165862897603 NO141934]	Sim
2254	2647	Scotland	1845	2096	Carn Ulie	650	32	2,133	105	08B	36	[57.113677531491;-3.3209401353895 NJ201033]	Sim
2255	2198	Scotland	1846	1724	Farragon Hill North Top	650	43	2,132	142	02A	52	[56.68317515232;-3.890265594015 NN843562]	Sim
2256	1127	Scotland	1847	866	Beinn nan Caorach	649	113	2,129	371	16F	15	NC080053	Hu,Sim
2257	1902	Scotland	1848	1481	Beinn an t-Sneachda	649	56	2,129	184	10D	40	NM985814	Sim
2258	2137	Scotland	1849	1673	Creag nan Adhaircean	649	46	2,129	151	04B	42	NN590862	Sim
2259	1715	England	146	115	Viewing Hill	649	66	2,129	217	35A	91	NY789331	Sim,Hew,N
2260	1467	Ireland	162	153	An Cnapan Mor	649	81	2,129	266	49B	70	Q522045	Sim,Hew,Dil,A,VL
2261	499	Ireland	163	71	Mullaghanish	649	264	2,129	866	48C	79	W214817	Ma,Sim,Hew,Dil,A,VL
2262	1368	Scotland	1850	1053	Beinn Dubhain	649	90	2,129	295	19C	56	NS143972	Sim,sHu
2263	2748	Scotland	1851	2184	Cruach Eighrach	649	30	2,129	98	19C	56	NS181920	Sim
2264	2373	Scotland	1852	1869	Creag a' Chait	649	38	2,129	125	08B	36 43	NO172958	Sim
2265	1084	England	147	76	Fleetwith Pike	649	118	2,129	388	34B	89 90	NY205141	Hu,Sim,Hew,N,W,B,Sy,Fel
2266	1242	Ireland	164	134	Coomcallee	649	101	2,129	331	50B	83 84	V623677	Hu,Sim,Hew,Dil,A,VL
2267	2614	Scotland	1853	2069	Sron Mhor	648	32	2,127	106	01A	51	NN641272	Sim
2268	1739	Scotland	1854	1353	Meall Tarsuinn	648	65	2,126	213	01A	52 58	NN877297	Sim
2269	1098	Scotland	1855	838	Carn a' Choire Leith	648	117	2,126	384	11B	34	NH264189	Hu,Sim
2270	1112	Scotland	1856	852	Druim Ghlaoidh	648	115	2,126	377	09C	34	NN274920	Hu,Sim
2271	1919	Scotland	1857	1495	Glas Bheinn	648	55	2,126	180	09B	34	NN377941	Sim
2272	1948	Scotland	1858	1517	Beinn nan Caorach North Top	648	54	2,126	177	16F	15	NC086060	Sim
2273	2011	Scotland	1859	1572	Carn Mor	648	51	2,126	167	15A	20	NH246870	Sim
2274	2333	Scotland	1860	1832	Carn Crom-loch	648	39	2,126	128	15B	20	NH387825	Sim
2275	2374	Scotland	1861	1870	Carn Bad an Daimh	648	38	2,126	125	09B	35	NH762217	Sim
2276	2594	Scotland	1862	2053	Meall Beag	648	33	2,126	108	15B	20	NH507752	Sim
2277	1453	Wales	104	82	Moel-yr-hydd	648	82	2,126	269	30B	115	SH672454	Sim,Hew,N
2278	1882	Wales	105	112	Foel Cwm-Sian Llwyd	648	57	2,126	187	30E	125	SH995313	Sim,Hew,N
2279	973	Scotland	1863	735	King's Seat Hill	648	135	2,126	443	26A	58	NS933999	Hu,Sim,D
2280	2550	Scotland	1864	2015	Beinn Thunicaraidh	648	34	2,126	112	17E	49	NM660368	Sim
2281	2111	Scotland	1865	1652	Cairn Caidloch	648	47	2,126	154	07B	44	NO430783	Sim
2282	1311	Ireland	165	141	Seahan	647	94	2,124	308	55B	56	O081196	Sim,Hew,Dil,A,VL,sHu
2283	577	Scotland	1866	430	Carn Salachaidh	647	234	2,123	768	15B	20	NH518874	Ma,G,Sim
2284	2334	Scotland	1867	1833	Mullach Coire Preas nan Seana-char	647	39	2,123	128	15B	20	NH440809	Sim
2285	144	Ireland	166	32	Truskmore	647	560	2,123	1,837	45D	16	G759473	Ma,Sim,Hew,Dil,A,VL,CoH,CoU
2286	1486	Scotland	1868	1151	Stob nan Coinnich Bhacain	647	80	2,123	262	01D	50 56	NN302145	Sim
2287	943	Scotland	1869	712	Meall nan Ruadhag	647	139	2,122	456	03A	41	NN298576	Hu,Sim
2288	2138	Scotland	1870	1674	Meall Reamhar	647	46	2,121	151	06B	43	NN993759	Sim
2289	1588	Scotland	1871	1233	Meall Odhar	646	73	2,119	240	01B	57	NN645149	Sim
2290	695	Scotland	1872	524	Beinn na Cloiche	646	194	2,119	636	04A	41	NN284648	Ma,G,Sim
2291	1612	Scotland	1873	1250	Beinn a' Chairein	646	72	2,119	236	11A	25	NH296318	Sim
2292	1949	Scotland	1874	1518	Meall Dubh	646	54	2,119	177	15A	20	NH214900	Sim
2293	2112	Scotland	1875	1653	Carn an Lochan	646	47	2,119	154	15B	20	NH501839	Sim
2294	2749	Scotland	1876	2185	An Stac North Top	646	30	2,119	98	10D	40	NM863891	Sim
2295	1883	Wales	106	113	Pen y Boncyn Trefeilw	646	57	2,119	187	30E	125	SH962283	Sim,Hew,N
2296	2375	England	148	162	Base Brown	646	38	2,119	125	34B	89 90	NY225114	Sim,Hew,N,W,B,Sy,Fel
2297	851	Scotland	1877	642	Biod an Fhithich	646	154	2,119	506	10A	33	NG950147	Ma,G,Sim
2298	2661	Scotland	1878	2109	Cruach Fhiarach	645	31	2,117	103	19C	56	NN256029	Sim
2299	1841	Scotland	1879	1435	Comb Law	645	59	2,116	194	27C	71 78	NS943073	Sim,D
2300	516	Wales	107	34	Drygarn Fawr	645	257	2,116	843	31C	147	SN862584	Ma,Sim,Hew,N
2301	867	Scotland	1880	654	Craignaw	645	151	2,116	495	27B	77	NX459833	Ma,G,Sim,D
2302	469	Ireland	167	68	Devilsmother	645	280	2,116	919	47C	37	L915624	Ma,Sim,Hew,Dil,A,VL
2303	1518	Scotland	1881	1178	Tarmangie Hill	645	78	2,116	256	26A	58	NN942014	Sim,D
2304	1105	Scotland	1882	845	Maol Breac	645	116	2,116	381	01D	50 56	NN258158	Hu,Sim
2305	430	Scotland	1883	319	Sgiath a' Chaise	644	303	2,114	994	01B	57	NN583169	Ma,G,Sim
2306	1532	Scotland	1884	1189	Sgor a' Chaorainn	644	77	2,113	253	15B	20	NH463781	Sim
2307	1553	Scotland	1885	1205	Airgiod-meall	644	76	2,113	249	08A	36	NH966067	Sim
2308	1613	Scotland	1886	1251	Leacann Doire Bainneir	644	72	2,113	236	09C	34	NN302946	Sim
2309	1920	Scotland	1887	1496	Druim nan Sac	644	55	2,113	180	05B	42	NN703896	Sim
2310	2557	Scotland	1888	2020	Smidhope Hill	644	33	2,113	110	28B	79	NT168076	Sim,DT
2311	1091	Ireland	168	117	Tonduff	644	118	2,113	387	55B	56	O159136	Hu,Sim,Hew,Dil,A,VL
2312	643	Ireland	169	81	Coomnadiha	644	208	2,113	682	51A	85	V847600	Ma,Sim,Hew,Dil,A,VL
2313	997	Scotland	1889	756	Meall Dearg	644	132	2,113	432	13B	25	NG935515	Hu,Sim
2314	2527	Scotland	1890	1998	Beinn Donachain SW Top	644	34	2,112	112	03C	50	NN189312	Sim
2315	1533	Scotland	1891	1190	Greenside Law	643	77	2,110	253	28B	72	NT197256	Sim,D
2316	1416	England	149	98	Yockenthwaite Moor	643	86	2,110	282	35B	98	SD909810	Sim,Hew,N
2317	1191	Scotland	1892	910	Creag a' Chuir	643	106	2,110	348	04B	42	NN504848	Hu,Sim
2318	1425	Scotland	1893	1097	Croidh-la	643	85	2,110	279	06A	35	NN775949	Sim
2319	1487	Scotland	1894	1152	Queen's Cairn	643	80	2,110	262	15B	20	NH466720	Sim
2320	1921	Scotland	1895	1497	Meikledodd Hill	643	55	2,110	180	27C	77	NS660027	Sim,DT
2321	2648	Scotland	1896	2097	Whitewisp Hill	643	32	2,110	105	26A	58	NN955013	Sim,DT
2322	293	Scotland	1897	216	Creag Tharsuinn	643	395	2,110	1,296	19C	56	NS087913	Ma,G,Sim
2323	1024	Scotland	1898	778	Clach Bheinn	643	128	2,110	420	19C	56	NS126886	Hu,Sim
2324	251	Ireland	170	42	Musheramore	643	437	2,109	1,434	48C	79	W328849	Ma,Sim,Hew,Dil,A,VL
2325	2693	Scotland	1899	2138	Creag na Feol	642	31	2,108	102	13A	19	NG942641	Sim
2326	590	Scotland	1900	441	Beinn Clachach	642	228	2,107	749	10A	33	NG885109	Ma,G,Sim
2327	2270	Scotland	1901	1784	Leacan Dubha	642	41	2,106	135	01B	51 57	NN681215	Sim
2328	1842	Scotland	1902	1436	Glas Bheinn	642	59	2,106	194	18C	49	NM833566	Sim
2329	2513	Scotland	1903	1986	Aonach Odhar	642	35	2,106	115	09B	35	NH708229	Sim
2330	1369	Scotland	1904	1054	Alhang	642	90	2,106	295	27C	77	NS642010	Sim,D,sHu
2331	1488	Ireland	171	155	Ardnageer	642	80	2,106	262	45C	11	G969908	Sim,Hew,Dil,A,VL
2332	2113	Scotland	1905	1654	Beinn Dubh	642	47	2,106	154	01E	56	NS335954	Sim
2333	1539	Scotland	1906	1195	Creag nan Eildeag	642	77	2,105	251	02B	51	NN596461	Sim
2334	765	Ireland	172	96	Cush	641	176	2,104	577	53A	74	R894262	Ma,Sim,Hew,Dil,A,VL
2335	2335	Scotland	1907	1834	Clockmore	641	39	2,103	128	28B	72	NT182228	Sim,DT
2336	495	Scotland	1908	365	Blath Bhalg	641	265	2,103	869	06B	43	NO019611	Ma,G,Sim
2337	581	Ireland	173	76	Scarr	641	232	2,103	761	55B	56	O132018	Ma,Sim,Hew,Dil,A,VL
2338	318	Ireland	174	48	Knocklomena	641	379	2,103	1,243	50B	78	V797765	Ma,Sim,Hew,Dil,A,VL
2339	756	Ireland	175	95	Cnoc na Banoige	641	178	2,103	584	49B	70	Q548048	Ma,Sim,Hew,Dil,A,VL
2340	1519	Ireland	176	156	Croaghbane	641	78	2,103	256	45C	11	G978910	Sim,Hew,Dil,A,VL
2341	377	Scotland	1909	278	Mor Bheinn	640	327	2,101	1,073	01B	51 52 57	NN716211	Ma,G,Sim
2342	2470	Scotland	1910	1949	Coomb Hill	640	36	2,100	118	28B	72	NT069263	Sim,DT
2343	2595	Scotland	1911	2054	Beinn Uidhe South Top	640	33	2,100	108	16E	15	NC288235	Sim
2344	2596	Scotland	1912	2055	Meall Doire na Mnatha	640	33	2,100	108	18B	40	NM895770	Sim
2345	2649	Scotland	1913	2098	Meall nan Eun East Top	640	32	2,100	105	10B	33	NG908052	Sim
2346	1950	England	150	132	Iron Crag	640	54	2,100	177	34B	89	NY123119	Sim,Hew,N,B,Sy,Fel
2347	2192	Ireland	177	198	Drung Hill	640	44	2,100	144	50A	78 83	V602878	Sim,Hew,Dil,A,VL
2348	918	Scotland	1914	694	Mullach Coire a' Chuir	640	143	2,100	469	19C	56	NN171034	Hu,Sim,sMa
2349	1454	Scotland	1915	1121	Creag an Sgor	640	82	2,100	269	21A	37	NJ373196	Sim
2350	1468	Scotland	1916	1134	Black Craig	640	81	2,100	266	07B	44	NO430904	Sim
2351	1407	England	151	96	Fell Head	640	86	2,099	282	35A	97	SD649981	Sim,Hew,N
2352	2480	Scotland	1917	1957	Carn na Saobhaidh East Top	639	36	2,097	117	09B	26 35	NH691255	Sim
2353	1922	Scotland	1918	1498	Hunt Law	639	55	2,096	180	28B	72	NT149264	Sim,DT
2354	1069	Scotland	1919	817	Carn Mor	639	121	2,096	397	15B	20	NH421715	Hu,Sim
2355	2193	Scotland	1920	1720	Beinn Tharsuinn Chaol West Top	639	44	2,096	144	14A	19	NG983748	Sim
2356	2514	Scotland	1921	1987	Meall a' Chrathaich East Top	639	35	2,096	115	11B	26	NH364223	Sim
2357	644	England	152	38	Yarlside	639	208	2,096	682	35A	98	SD685985	Ma,Sim,Hew,N
2358	372	Ireland	178	57	Cnoc na gCapall	639	330	2,096	1,083	50B	78	V834767	Ma,Sim,Hew,Dil,A,VL
2359	1791	Ireland	179	172	Beann South Top	639	62	2,096	203	50B	78	V728755	Sim,Hew,Dil,A,VL
2360	911	Scotland	1922	687	Ben Inverveigh	639	144	2,096	472	03C	50	NN271382	Hu,Sim,sMa
2361	2471	Scotland	1923	1950	Wester Hill	639	36	2,096	118	07B	44	NO445713	Sim
2362	901	Scotland	1924	678	Baca Ruadh	638	146	2,094	478	17A	23	NG474575	Hu,Sim,sMa
2363	1070	Scotland	1925	818	Stuc Odhar	638	121	2,093	397	01C	57	NN550087	Hu,Sim
2364	2012	Scotland	1926	1573	Sgurr na Ruadhraich South Top	638	51	2,093	167	12B	26	NH315351	Sim
2365	2194	Scotland	1927	1721	Creag a' Choire Dhuibh East Top	638	44	2,093	144	11A	25	NH284308	Sim
2366	1792	Wales	108	103	Moel Lefn	638	62	2,093	203	30B	115	SH552485	Sim,Hew,N
2367	2271	England	153	152	Grey Crag	638	41	2,093	135	34C	90	NY497072	Sim,Hew,N,W,B,Sy,Fel
2368	1923	Ireland	180	181	Binn Fraoigh	638	55	2,093	180	47B	37	L777544	Sim,Hew,Dil,A,VL
2369	500	Ireland	181	72	Eagle Mountain	638	264	2,093	866	43B	29	J244229	Ma,Sim,Hew,Dil,A,VL
2370	1951	Scotland	1928	1519	Tom Liath	638	54	2,093	177	21A	37	NJ331041	Sim
2371	870	Scotland	1929	656	Creag Gharbh	637	151	2,091	495	01A	51	NN632327	Ma,G,Sim
2372	2551	Scotland	1930	2016	Meall Dearg Far West Top	637	34	2,090	112	01A	52	NN868420	Sim
2373	1148	Scotland	1931	878	Creag Liath	637	110	2,090	361	09C	34	NN492936	Hu,Sim
2374	1678	Scotland	1932	1304	Carn na h-Ailig	637	68	2,090	223	08B	36	NJ073139	Sim
2375	2066	Scotland	1933	1616	Torr Leathann	637	49	2,090	161	15B	21	NH613785	Sim
2376	2376	Scotland	1934	1871	Gob a' Chairn	637	38	2,090	125	15B	20	NH424735	Sim
2377	1163	Scotland	1935	889	Whitehope Heights	637	109	2,090	358	28B	78	NT095139	Hu,Sim,D
2378	696	Scotland	1936	525	Croft Head	637	194	2,090	636	28B	79	NT153056	Ma,G,Sim,D
2379	2303	England	154	157	Causey Pike	637	40	2,090	131	34B	89 90	NY218208	Sim,Hew,N,W,B,Sy,Fel
2380	2552	England	155	176	Little Hart Crag	637	34	2,090	112	34C	90	NY387100	Sim,Hew,N,W,B,Sy,Fel
2381	745	Ireland	182	92	Knocknamanagh	637	180	2,090	591	52A	85	V990661	Ma,Sim,Hew,Dil,A,VL
2382	1661	Scotland	1937	1289	Beinn Mheadhon	637	69	2,090	226	17E	49	NM654378	Sim
2383	639	Scotland	1938	483	Beinn Bhalgairean	637	210	2,089	689	01D	50	NN202241	Ma,G,Sim
2384	189	England	156	8	Kinder Scout	636	497	2,088	1,629	36	110	SK084875	Ma,Sim,Hew,N,CoH,CoU,CoA
2385	2195	Scotland	1939	1722	Stuc Gharbh	636	44	2,087	144	01B	57	NN668173	Sim
2386	868	Scotland	1940	655	Glas Bheinn	636	151	2,087	495	18B	40	NM939757	Ma,G,Sim
2387	1520	Scotland	1941	1179	Carn Coire na Caorach	636	78	2,087	256	09B	35	NH801199	Sim
2388	1614	Scotland	1942	1252	Carn Alladale	636	72	2,087	236	15A	20	NH408898	Sim
2389	1149	Ireland	183	120	Lobawn	636	110	2,087	361	55A	56	S978977	Hu,Sim,Hew,Dil,A,VL
2390	1679	Ireland	184	166	Coomnacronia	636	68	2,087	223	50B	78	V679733	Sim,Hew,Dil,A,VL
2391	608	Scotland	1943	456	Beinn na Sroine	636	221	2,087	725	03C	50	NN233289	Ma,G,Sim
2392	2377	Scotland	1944	1872	Dubh Breac Hill	636	38	2,087	125	21A	37	NJ296152	Sim
2393	2597	Scotland	1945	2056	Coomb Dod	635	33	2,083	108	28B	72	NT046238	Sim,DT
2394	286	Scotland	1946	213	Beinn Ghobhlach	635	401	2,083	1,316	14A	19	NH055943	Ma,G,Sim
2395	1469	Scotland	1947	1135	Am Bathaich	635	81	2,083	266	09B	35	NH660138	Sim
2396	1504	Scotland	1948	1165	Carn an t-Sean-liathanaich	635	79	2,083	259	09A	27 36	NH869320	Sim
2397	1843	Scotland	1949	1437	Meall a' Chomhlain	635	59	2,083	194	09C	34	NN321936	Sim
2398	2013	Scotland	1950	1574	Creag Dhubh Tigh an Aitinn	635	51	2,083	167	09B	35	NH738180	Sim
2399	2598	Scotland	1951	2057	Carn Bhrain	635	33	2,083	108	15B	20	NH525874	Sim
2400	665	Ireland	185	85	Mullaghclogha	635	202	2,083	663	44B	13	H557957	Ma,Sim,Hew,Dil,A,VL
2401	1332	Wales	109	77	Garreg Las	635	92	2,083	302	32A	160	SN777203	Sim,Hew,N,sHu
2402	1647	Scotland	1952	1277	Cruach a' Bhuic	635	70	2,083	230	19C	56	NS169935	Sim
2403	927	Scotland	1953	700	Craig Leek	635	142	2,083	466	08B	36 43	NO185930	Hu,Sim,sMa
2404	1280	Scotland	1954	981	Tom Anthon	635	97	2,083	318	06B	43	NO098881	Sim,sHu
2405	885	Scotland	1955	667	Creag an t-Sithein	634	148	2,081	485	06B	43	NO031658	Hu,Sim,sMa
2406	1333	Scotland	1956	1024	Carn nam Bain-tighearna	634	92	2,080	302	09A	35	NH847253	Sim,sHu
2407	2304	Scotland	1957	1808	Meall a' Choire Chruinn	634	40	2,080	131	18B	40	NM879762	Sim
2408	661	Wales	110	42	Tarrenhendre	634	203	2,080	666	30F	135	SH682041	Ma,Sim,Hew,N
2409	2472	Wales	111	141	Creigiau Gleision North Top	634	36	2,080	118	30B	115	SH733622	Sim,Hew,N
2410	1489	Scotland	1958	1153	Carnach Mor	634	80	2,080	262	19C	56	NS140991	Sim
2411	2561	Scotland	1959	2024	Beinn Aoidhdailean	633	33	2,078	109	10A	33	NG886140	Sim
2412	893	Scotland	1960	671	Carn Bad a' Chreamha	633	147	2,077	482	11A	25 33	NG925264	Hu,Sim,sMa
2413	1458	Scotland	1961	1125	Carn Glac an Eich	633	82	2,077	268	09B	26 35	NH694267	Sim
2414	1150	Scotland	1962	879	Meall na h-Aodainn Moire	633	110	2,077	361	06B	43	NN941622	Hu,Sim
2415	375	Scotland	1963	276	Glas-charn	633	328	2,077	1,076	10D	40	NM846837	Ma,G,Sim
2416	884	Scotland	1964	666	Meall a' Bhainne	633	148	2,077	486	04A	41	NN306663	Hu,Sim,sMa
2417	1680	Scotland	1965	1305	Meallan Buidhe	633	68	2,077	223	14B	20	NH246695	Sim
2418	1025	England	157	72	Bleaklow Head	633	128	2,077	420	36	110	SK094960	Hu,Sim,Hew,N
2419	1589	England	158	106	Starling Dodd	633	73	2,077	240	34B	89	NY142157	Sim,Hew,N,W,B,Sy,Fel
2420	939	Ireland	186	107	Kells Mountain	633	140	2,077	459	50A	83	V528858	Hu,Sim,Hew,Dil,A,VL,sMa
2421	1151	Ireland	187	121	Binn Chaonaigh	633	110	2,077	361	47C	37	L900515	Hu,Sim,Hew,Dil,A,VL
2422	2336	Scotland	1966	1835	Creag an Eunan	633	39	2,077	128	21A	37	NJ386190	Sim
2423	760	Scotland	1967	569	Cruinn a' Bheinn	632	177	2,073	581	01C	56	NN365051	Ma,G,Sim
2424	1263	Wales	112	73	Fan Llia	632	99	2,073	325	32A	160	SN938186	Sim,Hew,N,sHu
2425	1534	Scotland	1968	1191	Hill of Three Stones	632	77	2,073	253	21A	37	NJ349226	Sim
2426	837	Scotland	1969	630	Meall a' Chaorainn	632	157	2,073	515	15A	20	NH360827	Ma,G,Sim
2427	1039	Scotland	1970	791	Meall Buidhe	632	126	2,073	413	06A	35	NN799955	Hu,Sim
2428	2305	Scotland	1971	1809	Meall a' Chrathaich West Top	632	40	2,073	131	11B	26	NH353216	Sim
2429	2473	Scotland	1972	1951	Hopetoun Craig	632	36	2,073	118	28B	79	NT187067	Sim,DT
2430	2378	England	159	163	Dovenest Top	632	38	2,073	125	34B	89 90	NY255113	Sim,Hew,N,B,Sy
2431	2694	England	160	186	Seathwaite Fell	632	31	2,073	102	34B	89 90	NY227097	Sim,Hew,N,B,Sy
2432	849	Ireland	188	102	An Chailleach	632	155	2,073	509	47B	37	L755537	Ma,Sim,Hew,Dil,A,VL
2433	481	Scotland	1973	353	Tullich Hill	632	273	2,073	896	01E	56	NN293006	Ma,G,Sim
2434	2431	Scotland	1974	1916	Ben Reoch East Top	631	36	2,071	119	01E	56	NN313018	Sim
2435	928	Scotland	1975	701	Beinn nan Eun	631	142	2,070	466	26B	57	NN723131	Hu,Sim,D,sMa
2436	2750	Scotland	1976	2186	Mullach Coire na Gaoitheag	631	30	2,070	98	15B	20	NH461817	Sim
2437	1565	Scotland	1977	1216	East Mount Lowther	631	75	2,070	246	27C	71 78	NS878099	Sim,D
2438	2474	Ireland	189	210	Laghtshanaquilla	631	36	2,070	118	53A	74	R951250	Sim,Hew,Dil,A,VL
2439	1320	Ireland	190	143	Boughil	631	93	2,070	305	50B	78	V842765	Sim,Hew,Dil,A,VL,sHu
2440	1308	Scotland	1978	1006	Blairdenon Hill	631	94	2,070	308	26A	58	NN865018	Sim,D,sHu
2441	1251	Scotland	1979	956	Tir Eilde	630	100	2,067	328	01A	52	NN830420	Hu,Sim
2442	1825	Wales	113	106	Pen yr Allt Uchaf	630	60	2,067	197	30E	124 125	SH870196	Sim,Hew,N
2443	1281	Ireland	191	139	Monabrack	630	97	2,067	318	53A	74	R859218	Sim,Hew,Dil,A,VL,sHu
2444	2695	Scotland	1980	2139	Carn Lochain Sgeireich	630	31	2,067	102	15B	20	NH390843	Sim
2445	1202	Wales	114	68	Moel Fferna	630	105	2,067	344	30E	125	SJ116397	Hu,Sim,Hew,N
2446	1324	Scotland	1981	1017	Beinn Bhreac	630	93	2,067	304	01D	50 56	NN202216	Sim,sHu
2447	1401	Scotland	1982	1078	Boc Mor	629	88	2,064	288	11A	25 33	NG917259	Sim
2448	2306	Scotland	1983	1810	Deer Law	629	40	2,064	131	28B	73	NT222255	Sim,DT
2449	1578	Wales	115	90	Fan Frynych	629	74	2,064	243	32A	160	SN957227	Sim,Hew,N
2450	2139	Wales	116	124	Craig Cerrig-gleisiad	629	46	2,064	151	32A	160	SN960218	Sim,Hew,N
2451	1740	Scotland	1984	1354	Meall an t-Seangain	629	65	2,064	213	08B	36	NJ179050	Sim
2452	1177	Scotland	1985	899	Meall a' Chuaille	629	108	2,064	354	15A	20	NH343820	Hu,Sim
2453	401	Wales	117	24	Y Garn	629	315	2,064	1,033	30D	124	SH702230	Ma,Sim,Hew,N
2454	2713	Wales	118	149	Foel Gron	629	31	2,064	101	30B	115	SH560568	Sim,Hew,N
2455	1426	Ireland	192	152	Knocknalougha	629	85	2,064	279	54A	74	S019100	Sim,Hew,Dil,A,VL
2456	2241	Scotland	1986	1759	Carn Bad a' Ghuail	629	42	2,064	138	08B	36	NJ179098	Sim
2457	1664	Scotland	1987	1292	Tom an Fhuarain	629	68	2,062	224	02A	52	NN863562	Sim
2458	950	Wales	119	59	Moel Penamnen	628	138	2,061	453	30D	115	SH716483	Hu,Sim,Hew,N
2459	942	Ireland	193	108	Glennamong	628	139	2,060	456	46B	23 30	F912058	Hu,Sim,Hew,Dil,A,VL
2460	2307	Scotland	1988	1811	Sron a' Chlaonaidh	628	40	2,060	131	05A	42	NN514654	Sim
2461	2607	England	161	180	Gragareth	628	33	2,060	108	35B	98	SD688793	Sim,Hew,N,CoU,CoA
2462	271	Scotland	1989	202	Beinn Dhorain	628	416	2,060	1,365	16D	17	NC925156	Ma,G,Sim
2463	1178	Scotland	1990	900	Creag-mheall Mor	628	108	2,060	354	14A	19	NG993815	Hu,Sim
2464	1793	Scotland	1991	1398	Carn nan Aighean	628	62	2,060	203	15B	20	NH387784	Sim
2465	1770	Scotland	1992	1381	Cold Moss	628	63	2,060	207	27C	71 78	NS898094	Sim,DT
2466	1771	Scotland	1993	1382	Alwhat	628	63	2,060	207	27C	77	NS646020	Sim,DT
2467	2599	England	162	178	Rough Crag (Riggindale)	628	33	2,060	108	34C	90	NY454112	Sim,Hew,N,B,Sy
2468	1187	Scotland	1994	908	Meall a' Chleirich	628	107	2,060	351	16B	16	NC407365	Hu,Sim
2469	1906	Scotland	1995	1484	Meall Odhar	627	56	2,057	182	01A	51	NN639322	Sim
2470	330	Ireland	194	52	Nephin Beg	627	364	2,057	1,194	46B	23	F931102	Ma,Sim,Hew,Dil,A,VL
2471	1924	Scotland	1996	1499	Carn a' Choire Mhoir	627	55	2,057	180	09A	35	NH842290	Sim
2472	2308	Scotland	1997	1812	Druim Min	627	40	2,057	131	18B	40	NM891635	Sim
2473	2696	Scotland	1998	2140	Beinn Mheadhoin West Top	627	31	2,057	102	12A	25	NH251479	Sim
2474	2697	Scotland	1999	2141	Creag Dhubh Bheag	627	31	2,057	102	12A	25	NH157473	Sim
2475	432	Ireland	195	63	Mullaghaneany	627	302	2,057	991	44B	13	H685986	Ma,Sim,Hew,Dil,A,VL,CoU
2476	929	England	163	64	Yewbarrow	627	142	2,057	466	34B	89 90	NY173084	Hu,Sim,Hew,N,sMa,W,B,Sy,Fel
2477	2600	Ireland	196	218	Shanlieve	627	33	2,057	108	43B	29	J240226	Sim,Hew,Dil,A,VL
2478	1334	Scotland	2000	1025	Beinn Mhic na Ceisich	627	92	2,057	302	03B	50	NN016493	Sim,sHu
2479	591	Scotland	2001	442	Beinn na Feusaige	627	228	2,056	748	13B	25	NH090542	Ma,G,Sim
2480	1862	Scotland	2002	1450	Sgurr Mor	627	58	2,056	190	10A	33	NG879079	Sim
2481	1808	Scotland	2003	1409	Meall Uaine	626	61	2,054	200	06B	43	NN936618	Sim
2482	1080	Scotland	2004	826	Beinn Bhreac	626	120	2,054	393	13A	19 24	NG838640	Hu,Sim
2483	1143	Scotland	2005	874	Hudderstone	626	111	2,054	364	28B	72	NT022271	Hu,Sim,D
2484	2272	Scotland	2006	1785	Beinn Odhar	626	41	2,054	135	26B	57	NN714127	Sim,DT
2485	1505	Scotland	2007	1166	Bowbeat Hill	626	79	2,054	259	28A	73	NT292469	Sim,D
2486	324	Scotland	2008	239	Beinn a' Chlachain	626	373	2,054	1,224	13B	24	NG724490	Ma,G,Sim
2487	369	Scotland	2009	272	Scaraben	626	331	2,054	1,086	16C	17	ND066268	Ma,G,Sim
2488	1455	Scotland	2010	1122	Meall an Tuirc	626	82	2,054	269	15B	21	NH539727	Sim
2489	2196	Scotland	2011	1723	Fraochaidh Far East Top	626	44	2,054	144	03B	41	NN053533	Sim
2490	2422	Scotland	2012	1908	Clach-mheall	626	37	2,054	121	06A	35	NN778931	Sim
2491	2423	Scotland	2013	1909	Glas Bheinn North Top	626	37	2,054	121	18C	49	NM836575	Sim
2492	1152	Wales	120	67	Foel y Geifr	626	110	2,054	361	30E	125	SH937275	Hu,Sim,Hew,N
2493	1349	Scotland	2014	1037	Clachan Yell	626	91	2,054	299	07B	44	NO446911	Sim,sHu
2494	2515	Scotland	2015	1988	Sgor a' Chaorainn Far West Top	625	35	2,051	115	15B	20	NH453777	Sim
2495	1490	Wales	121	83	Moel y Cerrig Duon	625	80	2,051	262	30E	125	SH923241	Sim,Hew,N
2496	1370	Ireland	197	147	Meenard Mountain	625	90	2,051	295	44B	13	H672985	Sim,Hew,Dil,A,VL,sHu
2497	1859	Ireland	198	178	Knocknamanagh NE Top	625	58	2,051	190	52A	85	W001672	Sim,Hew,Dil,A,VL
2498	2309	England	164	158	Darnbrook Fell	624	40	2,047	131	35B	98	SD884727	Sim,Hew,N
2499	2114	Scotland	2016	1655	Sgurr na Laire	624	47	2,047	154	18B	40	NM898654	Sim
2500	2310	Scotland	2017	1813	Slat Bheinn	624	40	2,047	131	17B	32	NG534208	Sim

== DoBIH codes ==
The DoBIH uses the following codes for the various classifications of mountains and hills in the British Isles, which many of the above peaks also fall into:

- Ma Marilyn
- Hu HuMP
- Sim Simm
- 5 Dodd
- M Munro
- MT Munro Top
- F Furth
- C Corbett
- G Graham
- D Donald
- DT Donald Top
- Hew Hewitt
- N Nuttall
- Dew Dewey
- DDew Donald Dewey
- HF Highland Five
- 4 400-499m Tump
- 3 300-399m Tump (GB)
- 2 200-299m Tump (GB)
- 1 100-199m Tump (GB)
- 0 0-99m Tump (GB)
- W Wainwright
- WO Wainwright Outlying Fell
- B Birkett
- Sy Synge
- Fel Fellranger
- CoH County Top – Historic (pre-1974)
- CoA County Top – Administrative (1974 to mid-1990s)
- CoU County Top – Current County or Unitary Authority
- CoL County Top – Current London Borough
- SIB Significant Island of Britain
- Dil Dillon
- A Arderin
- VL Vandeleur-Lynam
- O Other list (which includes):
  - Bin Binnion
  - Bg Bridge
  - BL Buxton & Lewis
  - Ca Carn
  - CT Corbett Top
  - GT Graham Top
  - Mur Murdo
  - P500 P500
  - P600 P600
- Un unclassified

prefixes:
- s sub
- x deleted

suffixes:
= twin

== People who have climbed all hills in a group ==
As of 31 December 2023, 7,654 people had climbed all 282 Scottish Munros; as of April 2020 eleven people had climbed all 1556 Marilyns of Great Britain; (Note: Does include the IOM, but does not include the 454 Marilyns on the Island of Ireland) while as of December 2024 only six people had climbed all the 2532 Simms of Great Britain: (Note: Does not include IOM or Ireland) Ken Whyte (Cruachan Beag 21/09/2010), Iain Thow (Cut Hill 07/06/2015), Michael Earnshaw (Cruach Fhiarach 16/07/2019), Rob Woodall (Sgurr Dhonuill West Top 28/06/2021), Anne Bunn (Torr Ceum na Caillich, 24/09/2022) and Callum Gray (Sgurr Dubh, 21/12/2024). The first three have also climbed the Irish Simms, so including all the Simms of the British Isles.

== See also ==
- Lists of mountains and hills in the British Isles
- Lists of mountains in Ireland
- List of Munro mountains
- List of Murdo mountains
- List of Furth mountains in the British Isles
- List of Marilyns in the British Isles
- List of P600 mountains in the British Isles
