= Ettrick Pen =

Hill in the Southern Uplands of Scotland

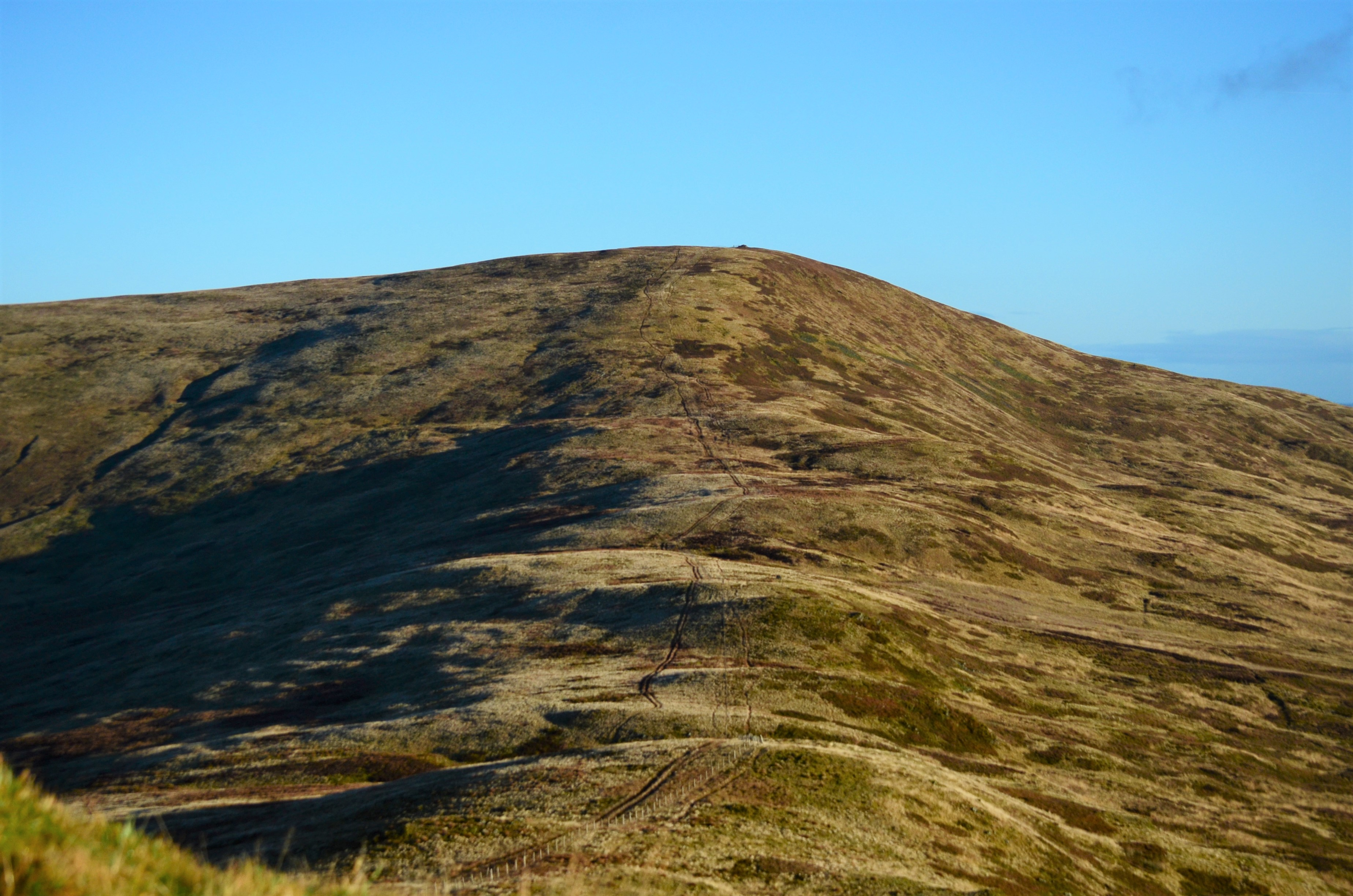

Highest point
- Elevation: 692 m (2,270 ft)
- Prominence: 358 m (1,175 ft)
- Listing: Ma,Hu,Tu,Sim,G,D,DN,Y
- Coordinates: 55°21′22″N 3°15′49″W

Geography
- Location: Dumfries and Galloway, Scottish Borders, Scotland
- Parent range: Ettrick Hills, Southern Uplands
- OS grid: NT 19991 07634
- Topo map: OS Landranger 79

Ettrick Pen is a hill in the Ettrick Hills range, part of the Southern Uplands of Scotland. A remote peak, It lies southwest of the village of Ettrick, on the border of the Scottish Borders and Dumfries and Galloway. The highest of the Ettrick Hills, it is crossed by the Southern Upland Way and is a prominent landmark from many directions. Its summit is topped by an ancient cairn.
