= Andrewhinney Hill =

Hill in the Southern Uplands of Scotland

Coordinates: 55.412224°N 3.268959°W

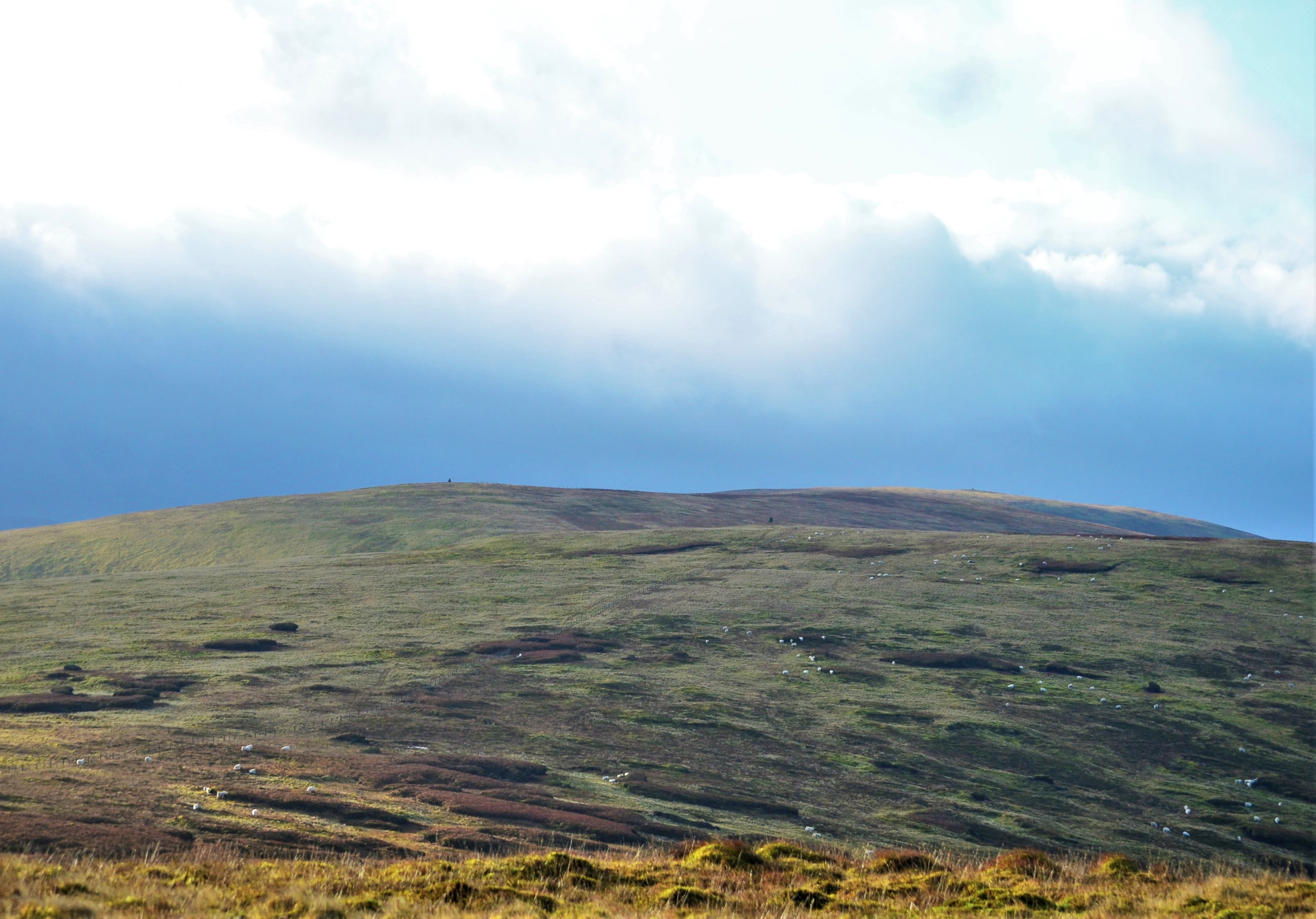

Highest point
- Elevation: 677.3 m (2,222 ft)
- Prominence: 194 m (636 ft)
- Listing: Ma,Hu,Tu,Sim,G,D,DN,Y

Geography
- Location: Dumfries and Galloway, Scottish Borders, Scotland
- Parent range: Ettrick Hills, Southern Uplands
- OS grid: NT 19760 13873
- Topo map: OS Landranger 79

Andrewhinney Hill is a hill in the Ettrick Hills range, part of the Southern Uplands of Scotland. It is the highest summit of a ridge that runs parallel to the A708 road on its southern side, with the Grey Mare's Tail in the Moffat Hills directly opposite. The northwestern slopes are designated as part of the 'Moffat Hills' SSSI and SAC.

== Subsidiary SMC Summits ==
Summit	Height (m)	Listing
Trowgrain Middle	728	DT,sSim
