= Bell Craig =

Hill in the Southern Uplands of Scotland

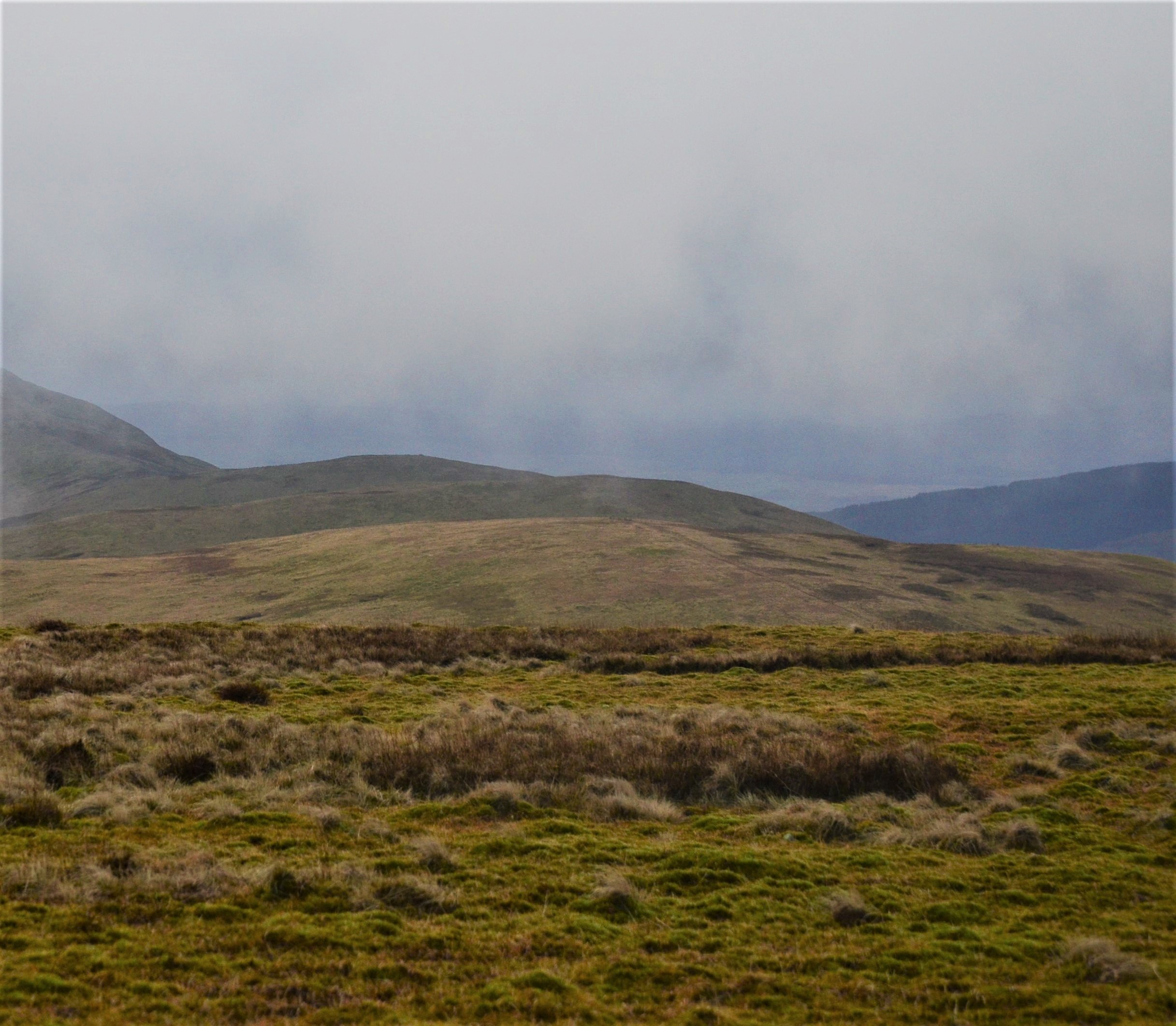

Highest point
- Elevation: 623 m (2,044 ft)
- Prominence: 47 m (154 ft)
- Listing: Tu,Sim,D,GT,DN

Geography
- Location: Dumfries and Galloway, Scottish Borders, Scotland
- Parent range: Ettrick Hills, Southern Uplands
- OS grid: NT 18655 12860
- Topo map: OS Landranger 79

Bell Craig is a hill in the Ettrick Hills range, part of the Southern Uplands of Scotland. It is part of a ridge that runs parallel to the A708 road on its southern side, with White Coomb in the Moffat Hills directly opposite. The northern slopes are designated as part of the 'Moffat Hills' SSSI and SAC - the summit marks a corner of the area.

== Subsidiary SMC Summits ==
Summit	Height (m)	Listing
Mid Rig	615.8	Tu,Sim,DT,GT,DN
