= Herman Law =

Hill in the Ettrick Hills range, Scotland

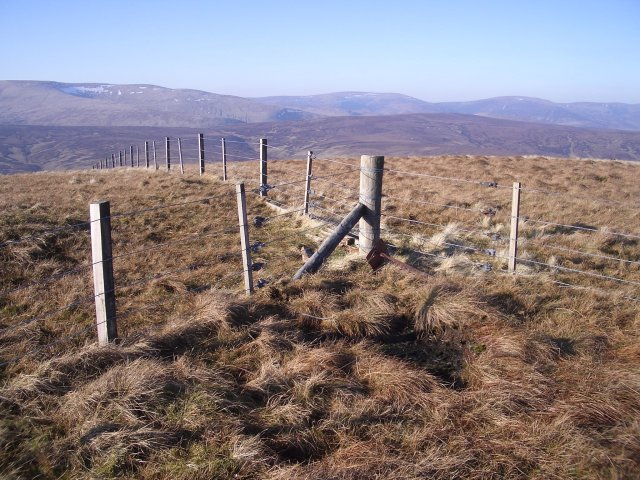

Highest point
- Elevation: 614.4 m (2,016 ft)
- Prominence: 30.9 m (101 ft)
- Listing: Tu,Sim,D,GT,DN

Geography
- Location: Dumfries and Galloway, Scottish Borders, Scotland
- Parent range: Ettrick Hills, Southern Uplands
- OS grid: NT 21350 15695
- Topo map: OS Landranger 79

Herman Law is a hill in the Ettrick Hills range, part of the Southern Uplands of Scotland. It is the terminal northeast Donald of a ridge that runs parallel to the A708 road on its southern side, also being the last to share the Dumfries and Galloway and Scottish Borders border. It is the least prominent Donald, just qualifying for the necessary 30m of prominence. Usually climbed with the neighbouring hills of the ridge, the most common start point is Birkhill Farm to the west.
