= Wind Fell =

Hill in the Southern Uplands of Scotland

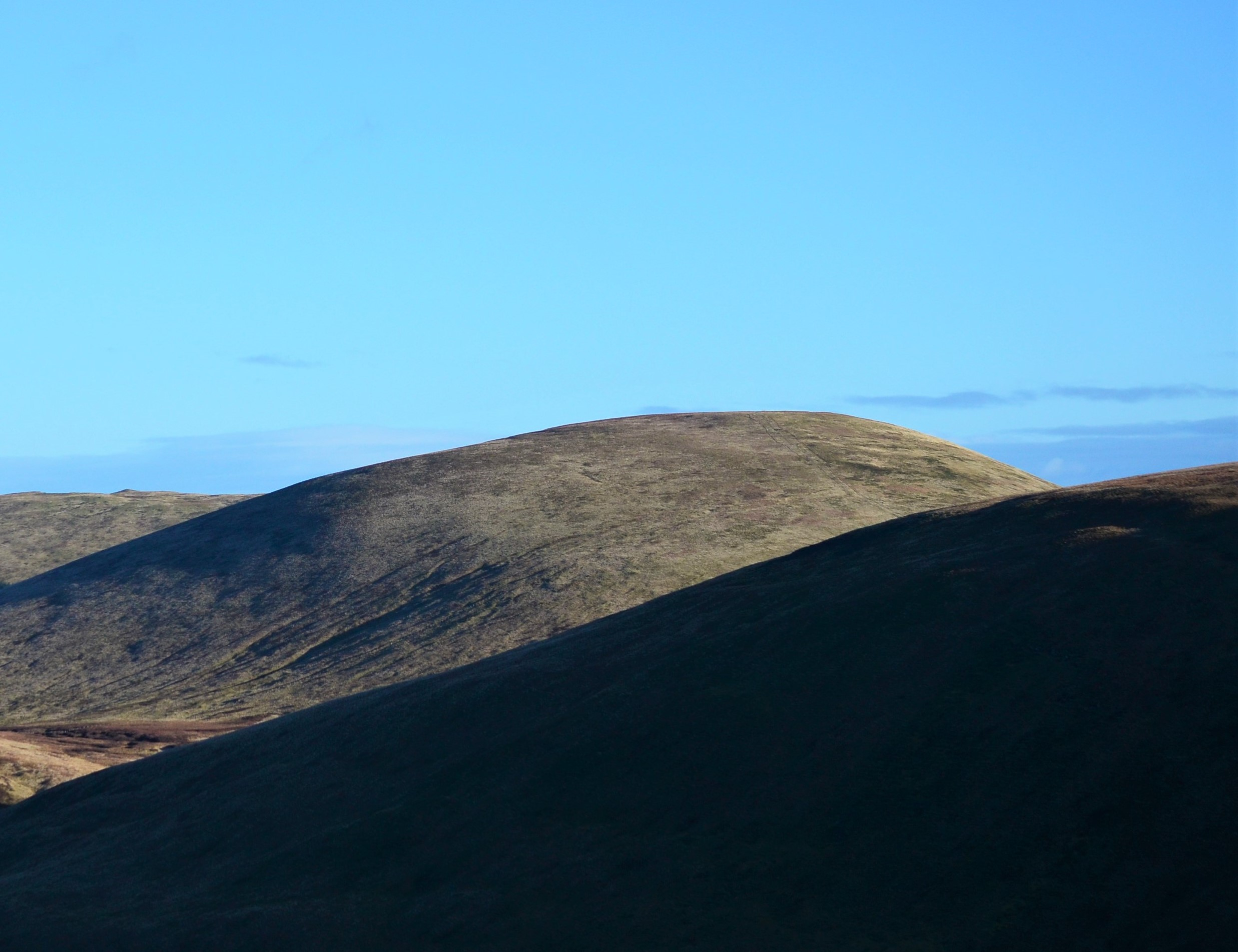

Highest point
- Elevation: 665 m (2,182 ft)
- Prominence: 90 m (300 ft)
- Listing: Tu,Sim,D,sHu,GT,DN

Geography
- Location: Dumfries and Galloway, Scottish Borders, Scotland
- Parent range: Ettrick Hills, Southern Uplands
- OS grid: NT 17897 06166
- Topo map: OS Landranger 79

Wind Fell is a hill in the Ettrick Hills range, part of the Southern Uplands of Scotland. The Dumfries and Galloway-Scottish Borders border lies across the hill. Close to the Southern Upland Way, routes of ascent frequently incorporate its track and it is almost always climbed along with the neighbouring hills.

== Subsidiary SMC Summits ==
Summit	Height (m)	Listing
Hopetoun Craig	632	Tu,Sim,DT,GT,DN
