= Croft Head =

Hill in the Southern Uplands of Scotland

Coordinates: 55°20′15.26″N 3°20′10″W

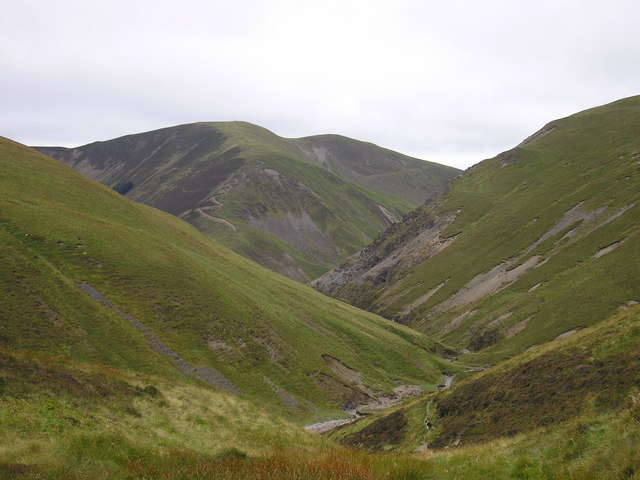

Highest point
- Elevation: 637 m (2,090 ft)
- Prominence: 194 m (636 ft)
- Listing: Ma,Hu,Tu,Sim, G, D,DN,Y

Geography
- Location: Dumfries and Galloway, Scotland
- Parent range: Ettrick Hills, Southern Uplands
- OS grid: NT 15309 05648
- Topo map: OS Landranger 79

Croft Head is a hill in the Ettrick Hills range, part of the Southern Uplands of Scotland. It offers unobstructed views to the Solway Firth, the fells and mountains of Cumbria and the Pennines to the south and east. To the north, the major Moffat Hills are close by and to the west, Queensberry, the Lowthers and many of the Galloway Hills can be seen. Its summit is easily reached from Moffat by taking the Southern Upland Way path east from the Moffat water bridge near Craigbeck. A ridge loop is possible by climbing north on the forestry fire road shortly after Craigbeck Hope cottage via Gateshaw Rig to Croft Head's summit and descending via Cat Shoulder to the junction of the SUW and the Selcoth burn pass.
