= Loch Fell =

Hill in the Southern Uplands of Scotland

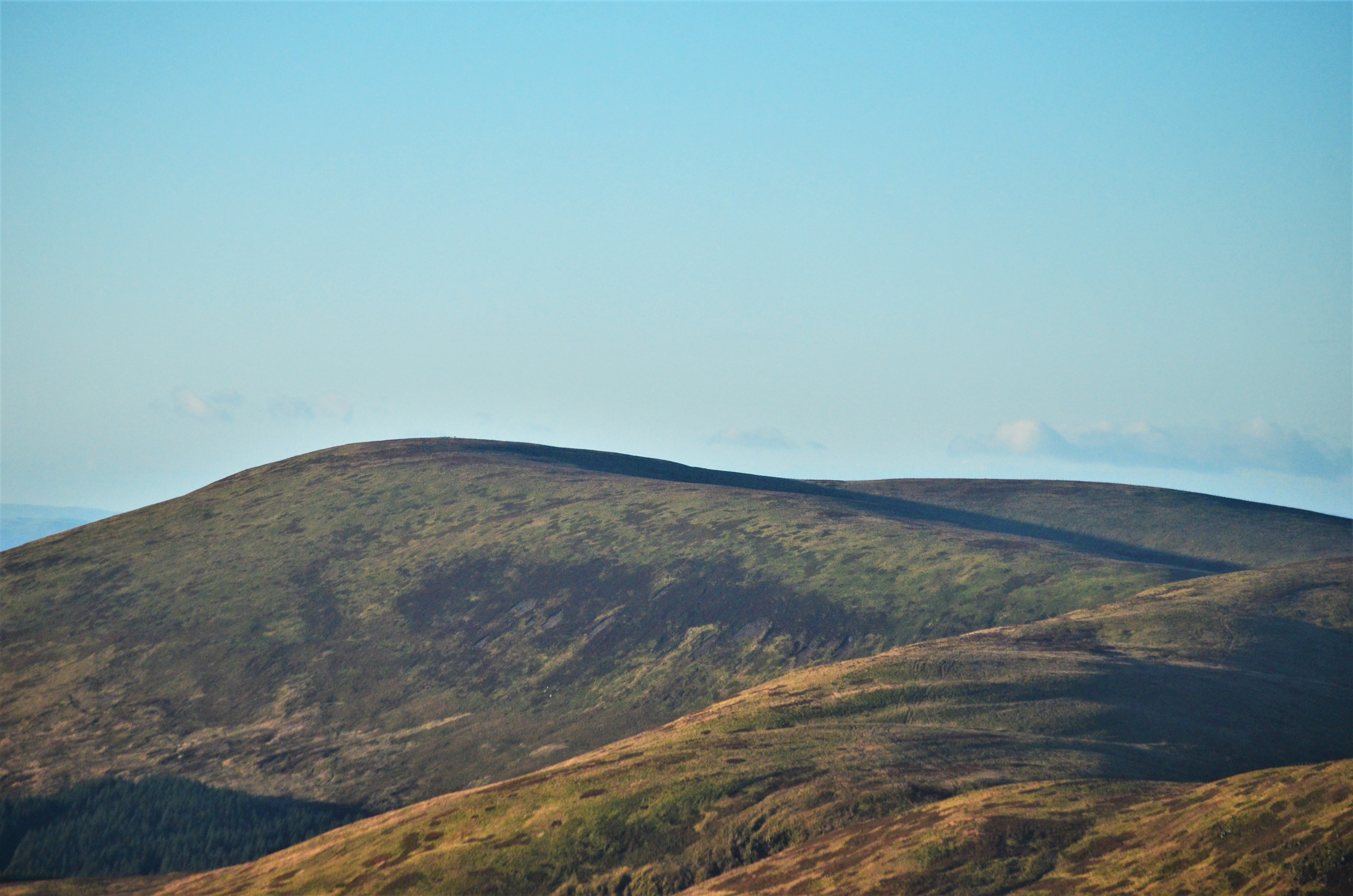

Highest point
- Elevation: 688 m (2,257 ft)
- Prominence: 124 m (407 ft)
- Listing: Hu,Tu,Sim,D,GT,DN,Y

Geography
- Location: Dumfries and Galloway, Scotland
- Parent range: Ettrick Hills, Southern Uplands
- OS grid: NT 17038 04730
- Topo map: OS Landranger 79

Loch Fell is a hill in the Ettrick Hills range, part of the Southern Uplands of Scotland. Close to the Southern Upland Way, routes of ascent frequently incorporate its track and it is almost always climbed along with the neighbouring hills.

== Subsidiary SMC Summits ==
Summit	Height (m)	Listing
West Knowe	672	Tu,Sim,DT,GT,DN
