= Gana Hill =

Hill in Dumfries and Galloway, Scotland

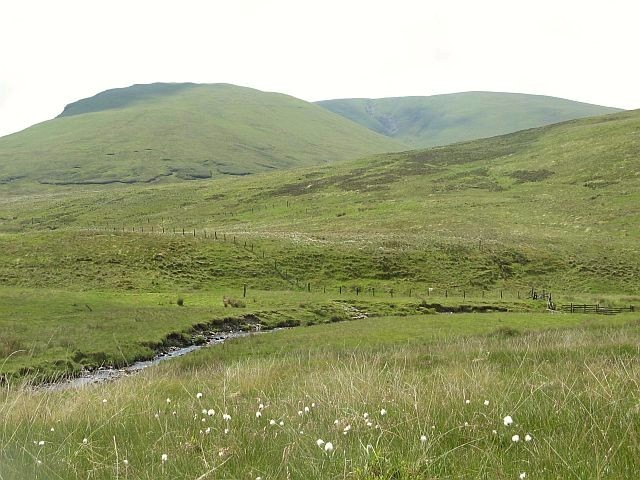

Highest point
- Elevation: 668 m (2,192 ft)
- Prominence: 117 m (384 ft)
- Listing: Hu,Tu,Sim,D,GT,DN,Y

Geography
- Location: Dumfries and Galloway, Scotland
- Parent range: Lowther Hills, Southern Uplands
- OS grid: NS 95439 01067
- Topo map: OS Landranger 78

Gana Hill is a hill in the Lowther Hills range, part of the Southern Uplands of Scotland. Often considered the hill on which the source of the River Clyde begins, it is normally climbed with the neighbouring hills.
