= Ettrick Hills =

Range of hills that are part of the Southern Uplands of Scotland

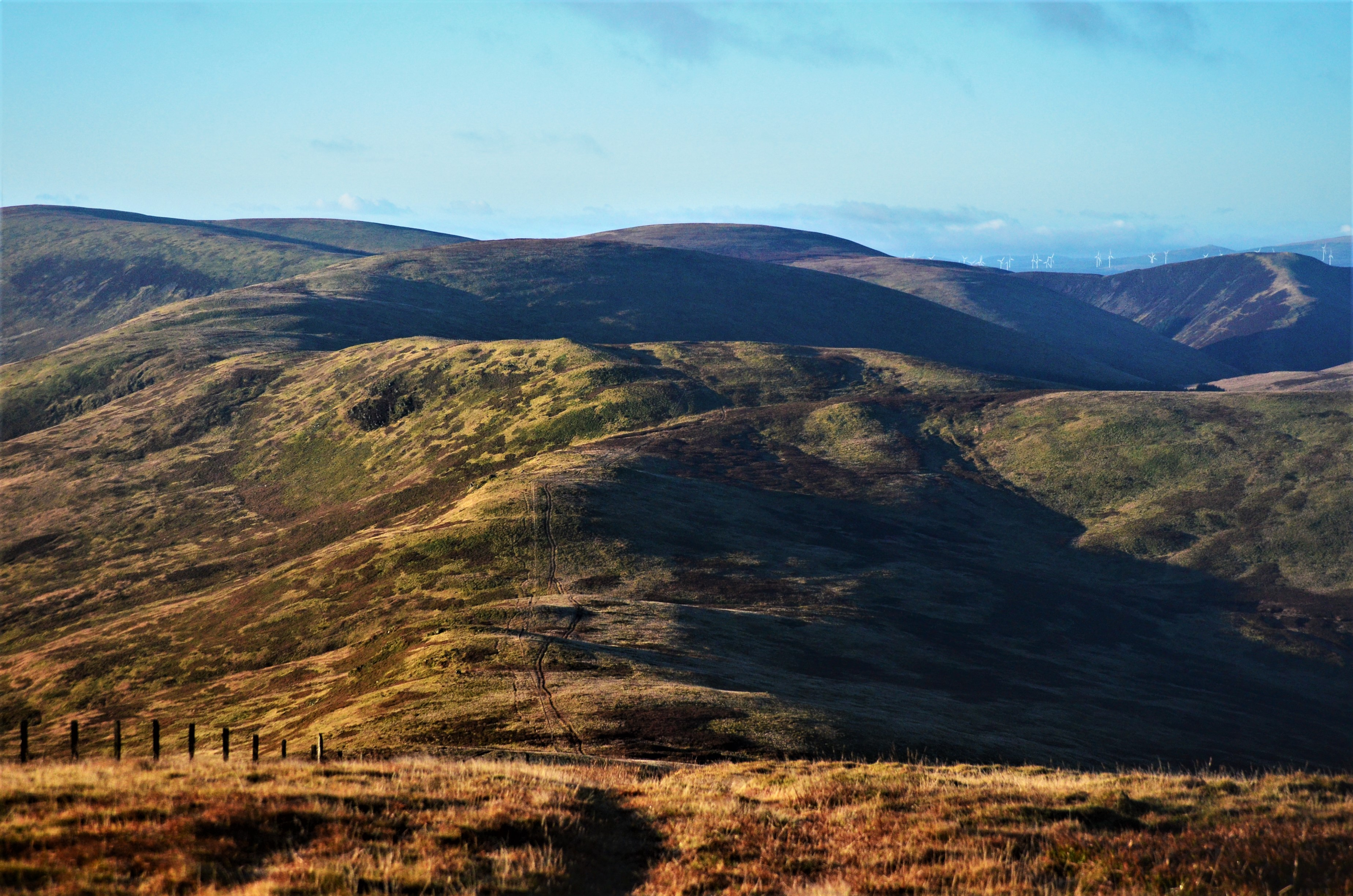
The more southwesterly Ettrick Hills from Ettrick Pen. [L-R]: Loch Fell, Wind Fell, Hopetoun Craig, West Knowe and Croft Head.

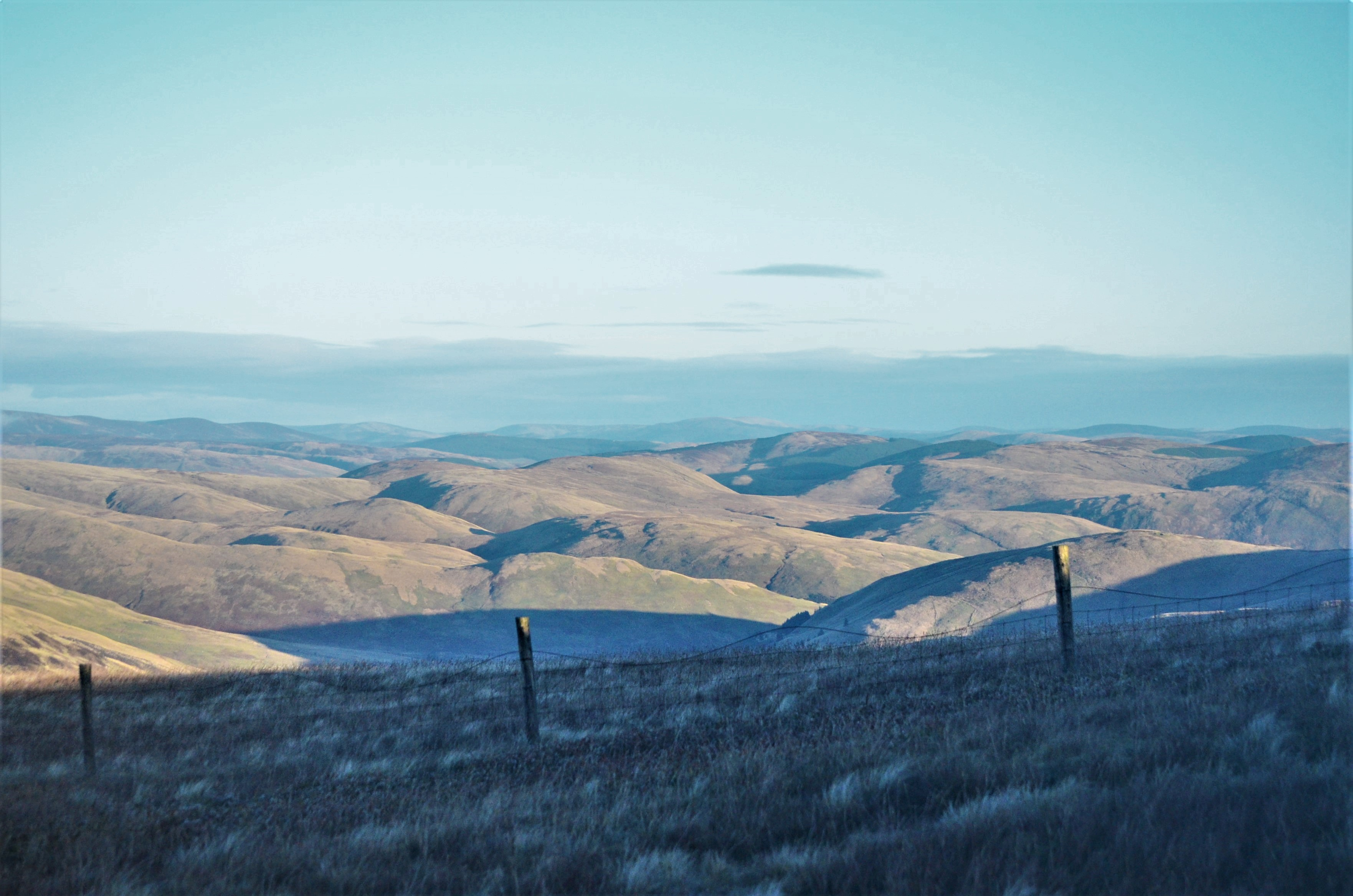
The more northeasterly Ettrick Hills from Ettrick Pen. The highest hill right of centre is probably The Wiss. The hill in the distant centre background is Windlestraw Law.

The Ettrick Hills are a range of hills that are part of the Southern Uplands of Scotland. They are neighboured to the northwest by the Moffat Hills and are located mainly within the Scottish Borders; however, the Dumfries and Galloway border covers the south and southwesterly flanks.

== The Hills ==
Not strictly defined, the hills form a lightly curving southwest–northeast shape and cover a considerable area. The Ettrick valley to the east separates them from the Craik Forest and the western border follows the A708 road. The large area west of Hawick, southwest of Selkirk and south of Yarrow Water could also be said to be part of the range as well as part of the historic Ettrick Forest. The hills are relatively low-lying for the counties in which they lie, with the highest summit, Ettrick Pen, being 692m, however, unlike other nearby ranges, could be said to follow a definitive direction. The highest hills are on the western extremity of the area.

In a roughly southwest–northeast direction, the hills in the range over 2000 ft are:

| Summit | Height (m) | Listing |
|---|---|---|
| Croft Head | 637 | Ma,Hu,Tu,Sim, G, D,DN,Y |
| West Knowe | 672 | Tu,Sim,DT,GT,DN |
| Loch Fell | 688 | Hu,Tu,Sim, D,GT,DN,Y |
| Wind Fell | 665 | Tu,Sim, D,sHu,GT,DN |
| Capel Fell | 678 | Ma,Hu,Tu,Sim, G, D,DN,Y |
| Hopetoun Craig | 632 | Tu,Sim,DT,GT,DN |
| Smidhope Hill | 644 | Tu,Sim,DT,GT,DN |
| Ettrick Pen | 692 | Ma,Hu,Tu,Sim, G, D,DN,Y |
| Bodesbeck Law | 664.2 | Hu,Tu,Sim, D,GT,DN,Y |
| Mid Rig | 615.8 | Tu,Sim,DT,GT,DN |
| Bell Craig | 623 | Tu,Sim, D,GT,DN |
| Andrewhinney Hill | 677.3 | Ma,Hu,Tu,Sim, G, D,DN,Y |
| Trowgrain Middle | 628 | DT,sSim |
| Herman Law | 614.4 | Tu,Sim, D,GT,DN |

== Other information ==
The area is renowned for its history, being part of the enormous Ettrick Forest, being the birthplace and frequent literary subject of the 'Ettrick Shepherd', James Hogg as well as the birthplace and workplace of Tibbie Shiel, among other things.

== Etymology ==
The area has a predominantly early Scots influence. 'Ettrick' is thought by W. F. H. Nicolaisen to be Proto-Indo-European, in reference to the Ettrick Water from where the hills and settlements take their name. Ettrick Pen was known to have different names at the same time, known as The Penn of Ettrick and Hill of Penn of Esdaile Moore from Tweedsdale and Eskdale respectively.
