= Bodesbeck Law =

Hill in Scotland

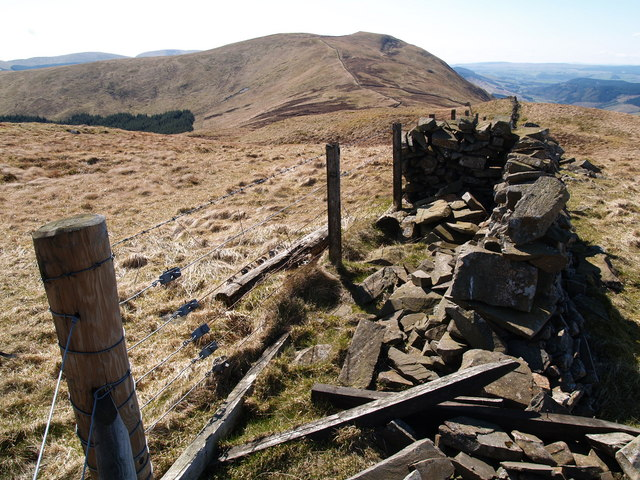

Highest point
- Elevation: 664.2 m (2,179 ft)
- Prominence: 101.3 m (332 ft)
- Listing: Hu,Tu,Sim,D,GT,DN,Y
- Coordinates: 55°22′50″N 3°18′42″W

Geography
- Location: Dumfries and Galloway, Scottish Borders, Scotland
- Parent range: Ettrick Hills, Southern Uplands
- OS grid: NT 16994 10405
- Topo map: OS Landranger 79

Bodesbeck Law is a hill in the Ettrick Hills range, part of the Southern Uplands of Scotland. It is the primary west-south-western terminus of the ridge that runs parallel to the A708 road along the Dumfries and Galloway-Scottish Borders border, occasionally titled the "Bodesbeck Ridge".
