= Southern Uplands =

Southernmost region of Scotland

Coordinates: 55.41°N 3.28°W

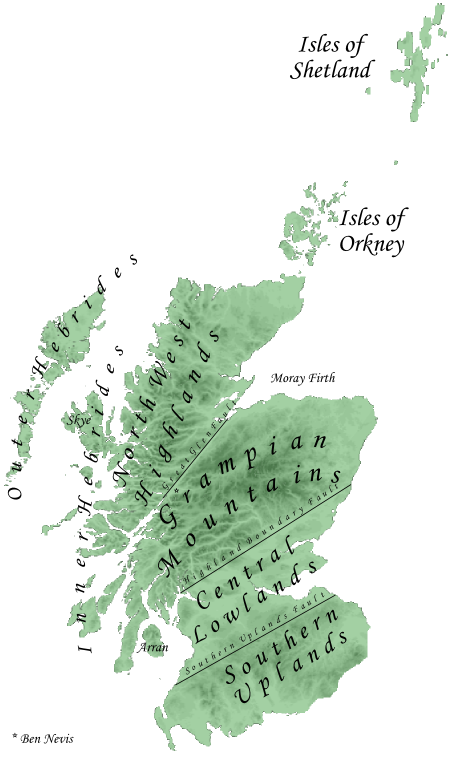
Southern Uplands and other geographical areas of Scotland

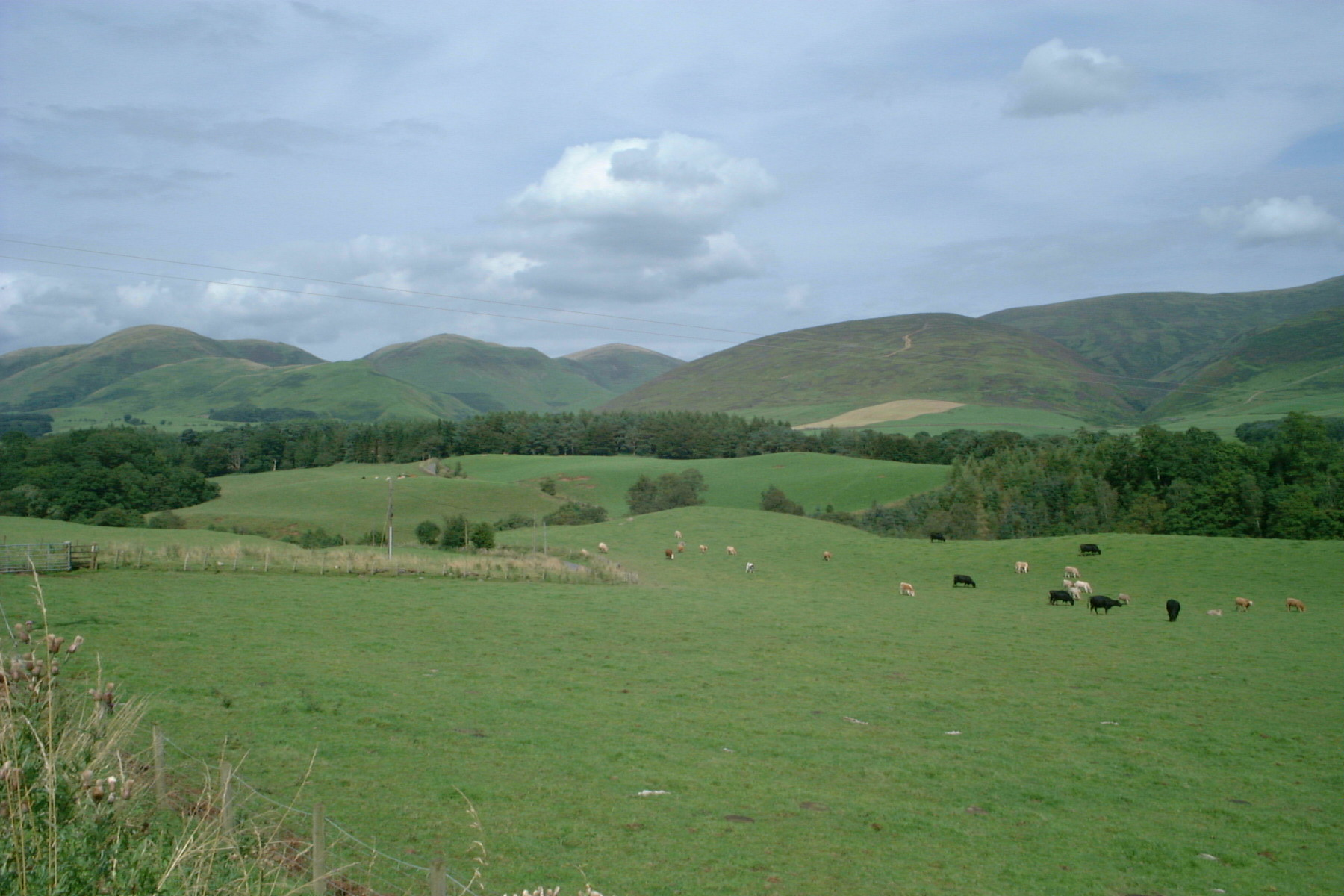
The hills around Durisdeer from the A702 road

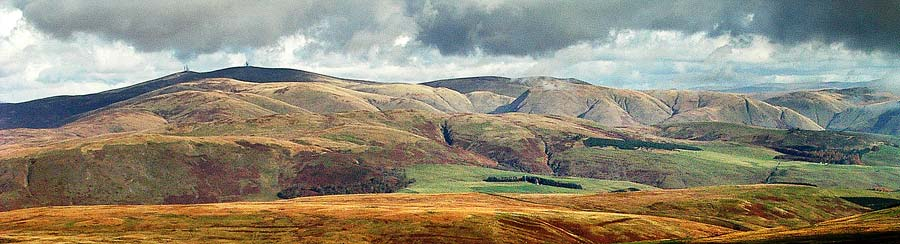
Looking east across Nithsdale to the Lowther Hills – from Cairnkinna in the Scaur Hills

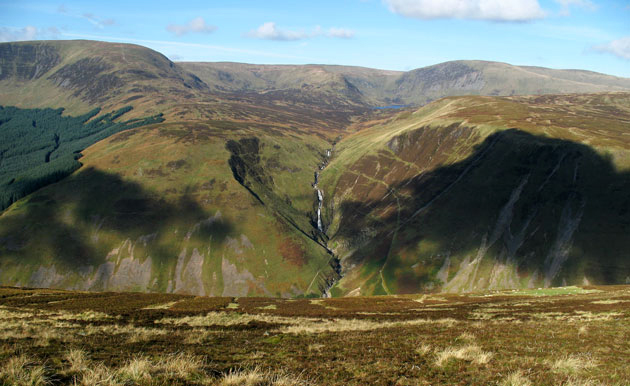
Grey Mare's Tail in the Moffat Hills from the Bodesbeck Ridge in the Ettrick Hills

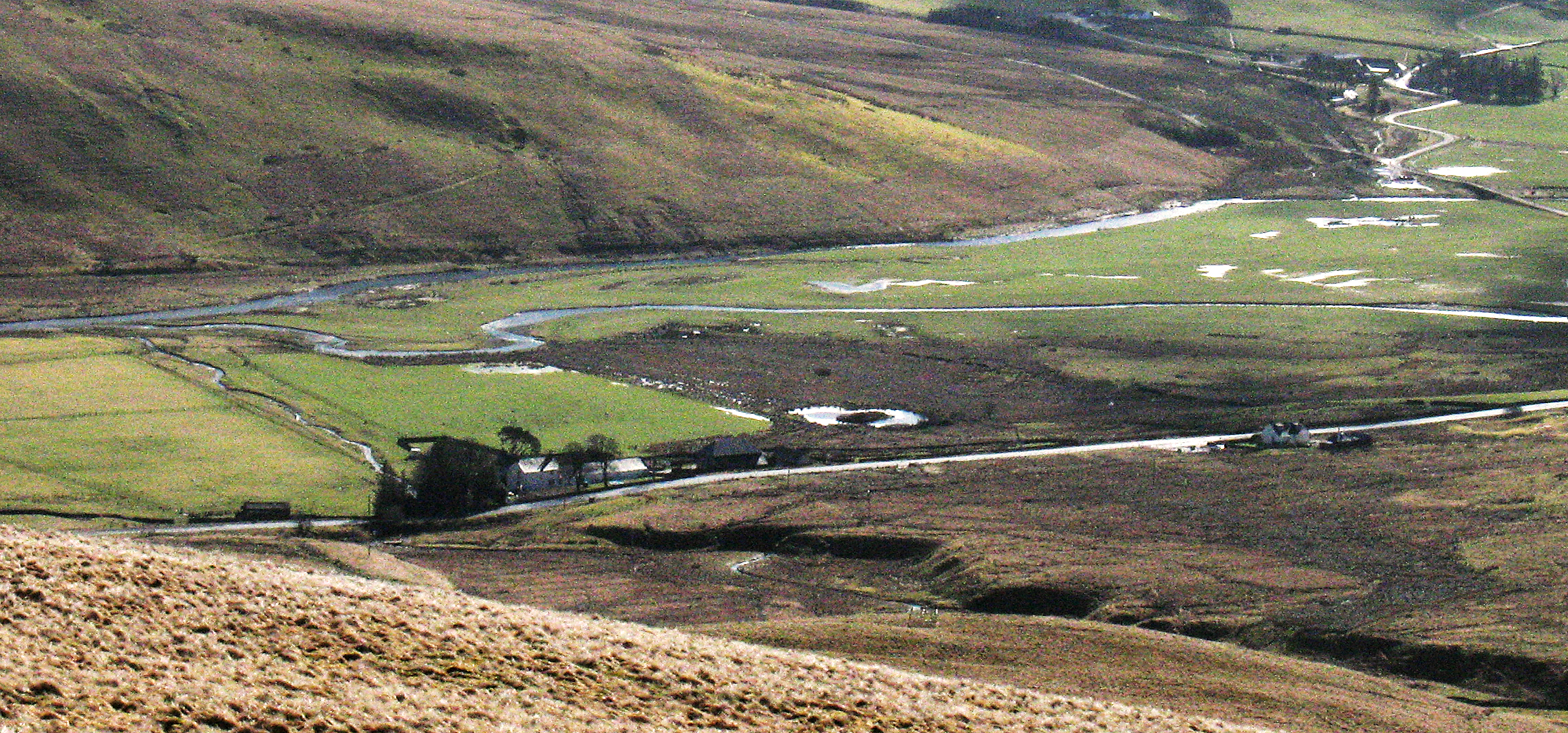
Source of the River Clyde where the Daer Water meets the Potrail Water

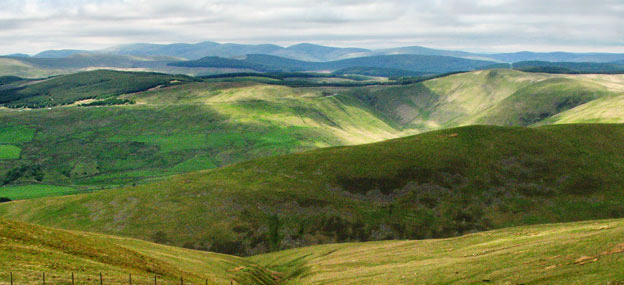
From Hart Fell looking west to the Devil's Beef Tub

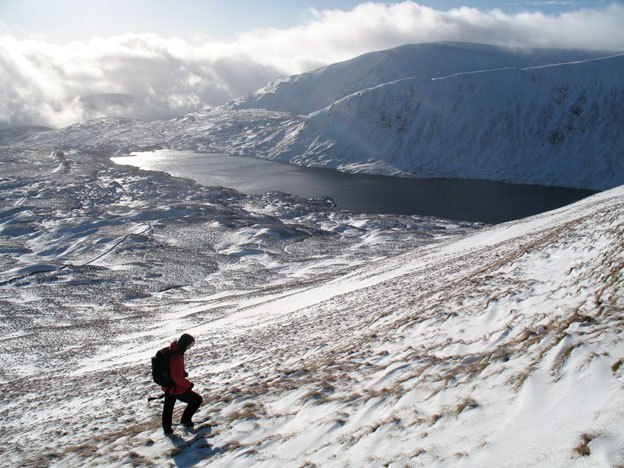
Loch Skene to Mid Craig and White Coomb from Lochcraig Head

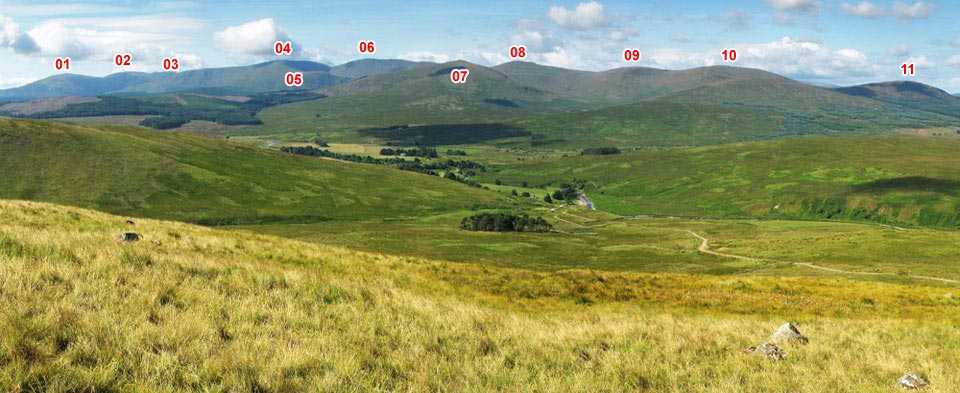
Rhinns of Kells Range from the Carsphairn Hills

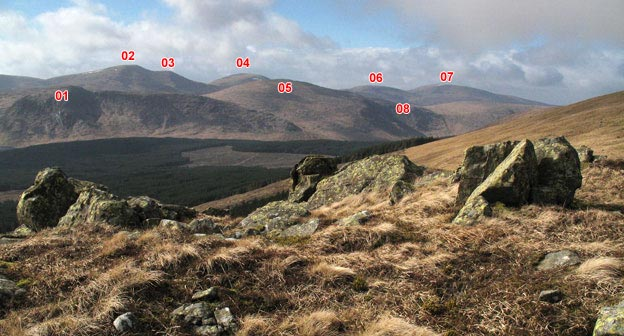
01 Dungeon Hill – 02 Merrick – 03 Little Spear of Merrick – 04 Kirriereoch – 05 Mullwharchar – 06 Tarfessock – 07 Shalloch on Minnoch – 08 Hoodens Hill

The Southern Uplands (Scottish Gaelic: Na Monaidhean a Deas) are the southernmost of mainland Scotland's four major geographic areas (the others being the Central Lowlands, the Grampian Mountains and the Northwest Highlands). The term is used both to describe the geographical region and to collectively denote the various ranges of hills and mountains within this region. An overwhelmingly rural and agricultural region, the Southern Uplands are partly forested and contain many areas of open moorland - the hill names in the area are congruent with these characteristics.

== Geology ==
The Southern Uplands consist mainly of Silurian sedimentary deposits deposited in the Iapetus Ocean 420 million years ago. These rocks were pushed up from the sea bed into an accretionary wedge during the Caledonian orogeny, roughly 400 million years ago (Ma), when the continents and terranes of Laurentia, Baltica and Avalonia collided. The Caledonian orogeny is named for Caledonia, a Latin name for Scotland. The majority of the rocks are weakly metamorphosed coarse greywacke.

The tectonic processes involved in the formation of the accretionary wedge, where sediment is scraped off the seafloor as a tectonic plate is subducted, has led to the formation of multiple, major, east–west faults that are now exploited by rivers and define valleys across the Southern Uplands. Levels of deformation associated with these faults is highly variable but is pervasive in the finer-grained sediments. Secondary mineralisation has further altered these Lower Palaeozoic rocks which are hosts for some distinctive springs, some of which have been exploited for tourism, such as those around Moffat.

== Geography ==
The Southern Uplands lie south of the Southern Uplands Fault line that runs from Ballantrae on the Ayrshire coast northeastwards to Dunbar in East Lothian on the North Sea coast, a distance of some 220 km (140 mi).

=== Hill ranges ===
There are several ranges of hills and mountains within the Southern Uplands. From east to west these are:

- Cheviot Hills straddling the eastern end of the Anglo-Scottish border.
- Lammermuir Hills south of Dunbar.
- Moorfoot Hills south of Edinburgh.
- Tweedsmuir or Manor Hills south of Tweedsmuir.
- Culter Hills south of Biggar.
- Moffat Hills north-east of Moffat.
- Ettrick Hills south of Moffatdale.
- Lowther Hills between Clydesdale/Annandale and Nithsdale.
- Carsphairn and Scaur Hills between Nithsdale and the Glenkens.
- Galloway Hills west of the Glenkens. This is a large hill area lying between Loch Doon in the north and the Solway Firth to the south and have the sub-ranges: The Awful Hand, Dungeon Hills, Rhinns of Kells, Minnigaff Hills and Cairnsmore of Fleet.

==== Peaks ====
Although the summits are not as high as many in the Scottish Highlands nor other famous mountain regions, parts of the Southern Uplands are remote and mountainous, containing about 120 Marilyns, the majority of the Donalds and a substantial number of Corbetts and Grahams.

Some of the more notable peaks in the Southern Uplands are:

- Merrick: the highest in the south of Scotland at 843 m (2,766 ft)
- Broad Law: 840 m (2,760 ft)
- White Coomb: 822 m (2,697 ft)
- The Cheviot: 815 m (2,674 ft)
- Corserine: 814 m (2,671 ft)
- Cairnsmore of Carsphairn: 797 m (2,615 ft)
- Kirriereoch Hill: 786 m (2,579 ft)
- Shalloch on Minnoch: 769 m (2,523 ft)
- Lamachan Hill: 717 m (2,352 ft)
- Cairnsmore of Fleet: 711 m (2,333 ft)
- Tinto: 711 m (2,333 ft)
- Craignaw: 645 m (2,116 ft)

The Southern Uplands are home to the UK's second highest, and Scotland's highest, village, Wanlockhead, 430 m (1,410 ft) above sea level.

=== Rivers and lochs ===
The region is drained by numerous rivers, the most important of which are Scotland's third and fourth longest, the River Clyde at 106 mi (171 km) and the River Tweed at 97 mi (156 km) respectively. Several significant rivers drain southwards into the Solway Firth and Irish Sea including (from west to east) the River Cree, River Dee, River Urr, River Nith, River Annan and the River Esk.

There are numerous lochs in the Southern Uplands, particularly in the west. The largest is Loch Ken, the water level of which was increased in 1936 when the Glenlochar Barrage was installed on the River Dee. The Water of Ken was dammed to create manmade lochs as part of the Galloway Hydro Scheme, as were several other lochs in Galloway such as Loch Doon, Loch Bradan and Clatteringshaws Loch. Many smaller lochs remain in a more natural state such as Loch Dee, Loch Enoch, Loch Grannoch and Loch Trool.

To the east of Moffat is the largest natural body of water in the Borders Region of the Southern Uplands, St. Mary's Loch together with the adjacent Loch of the Lowes and nearby Loch Skeen. There are several other reservoirs in the vicinity including Megget Reservoir, Talla Reservoir and Fruid Reservoir whilst Daer Reservoir lies among the Lowther Hills.

== Wildlife ==
The area has a wide diversity of species and habitats. The uplands support black and red grouse, mountain hares, golden eagles, hen harriers and some unusual plant species. The western hills are home to red deer, roe deer, feral goats and wild boar. The western forests have one fifth of the Scottish population of red squirrels. Ospreys are present at some of the lochs of the Galloway Forest Park, St Mary's Loch and along the River Tweed. Brown trout are common in many burns and a number of the rivers in the area have populations of sea trout, salmon and Eurasian otters.

== Local government ==
The two unitary authorities of Dumfries and Galloway in the west and the Scottish Borders in the east cover almost all of the Southern Uplands. Along its northern margins, the councils of South Ayrshire, East Ayrshire, South Lanarkshire and East Lothian extend into the region. After local government reorganisation in 1974 and prior to further reorganisation in 1996, the Southern Uplands were administered by the two 'regions' of Dumfries & Galloway and Borders along with the southern margins of the regions of Strathclyde and Lothian. Within each of these regions were districts with their own district councils. Historically, i.e. prior to 1974, the region comprised the counties of Wigtown, Kirkcudbright, Dumfries, Roxburgh, Peebles, Selkirk and Berwick together with parts of Ayrshire, Lanarkshire, Midlothian and East Lothian.

The geography of the region has caused it to be sparsely populated, a characteristic shared with the Highlands but in contrast to the Central Lowlands. Although the political and geographical borders do not precisely coincide, the two southern local authority areas have a combined population of around 265,000 across 4,314 square miles (11,170 km^{2}), fewer inhabitants than five of the areas within the Central Lowlands, for example North Lanarkshire is home to 340,000 across 184 square miles (480 km^{2}).

== Economy ==
Agriculture and forestry are the main forms of land use in the Southern Uplands. Sustainable power has been in production for several decades: the Galloway hydro-electric power scheme was built between 1930 and 1936. More recently a number of wind farms have been developed on upland sites. Tourism and recreation are of increasing importance: walking, fishing and grouse shooting are traditional pursuits and mountain biking has become popular in recent years.

The textile industry employed large numbers in many of the towns of the Scottish Borders in the 19th and 20th centuries. Stocking frames were introduced in Hawick in 1771 and Galashiels' first woollen mill was built in 1800, but textile manufacture had a long history in the area: linen production had been a major industry since the Middle Ages. The textile industry declined in the late 20th century, with 7,800 people employed in 1981 and only 4,400 by 1998. However, it continues to be significant both to the local economy and to that of Scotland in general.

=== Agriculture ===
Generally, sheep and arable farming are more predominant in the Scottish Borders to the east, while dairy farming is traditionally more important in Dumfries and Galloway, although recent years here have seen a move away from cattle grazing towards sheep farming. Several breeds of livestock have originated in the Southern Uplands, including Galloway cattle, Ayrshire dairy cattle and Cheviot sheep.

=== Forestry ===
Large areas of the Southern Uplands are covered with forests such as:

- Forest of Ae
- Mabie Forest
- Galloway Forest

The amount of forested land cover in the western Southern Uplands increased greatly between the 1940s and the 1980s, from 1% to 23%.

== Transport ==
The Southern Uplands have always formed a major obstacle to travel between the more heavily populated and industrialised Central Belt of Scotland and England to the south. Major roads and railways follow the east coast route and various valley routes radiating northwards from the Carlisle area.

=== Road ===
Several primary roads run through the Southern Uplands, most of which run north–south, with the most notable exception being the A75. The most significant of these roads is the M74 motorway connecting Scotland and England. These roads include:

- A77: From Stranraer towards Kilmarnock shortly after which it becomes the M77 to Glasgow
- A76: From Dumfries towards Kilmarnock
- M74/A74(M): From the end of the M6 at the Scottish border near Gretna connecting with the rest of the Scottish motorway network just outside Glasgow.
- A701: From Dumfries towards Edinburgh via Moffat and the Devil's Beef Tub
- A7: From Carlisle to Edinburgh via Hawick and Galashiels and the Scottish Borders
- A68: From Edinburgh via Jedburgh in the Scottish Borders to the English counties of Northumberland and Durham
- A1: The primary East coast cross border route running from Edinburgh towards Newcastle Upon Tyne and beyond
- A75: From Gretna through Dumfries and Galloway to Stranraer

=== Rail ===
Five railway lines pass through, or into, the Southern Uplands; all in a roughly north–south direction. These are the:

- West Coast Main Line linking Glasgow and Edinburgh to the north with Carlisle and the rest of England to the south with a station in the Southern Uplands at Lockerbie.
- East Coast Main Line running from Edinburgh to the north via Dunbar to Berwick-upon-Tweed, Newcastle upon Tyne and the south.
- Stranraer–Glasgow line via Girvan and numerous other stations.
- Glasgow–Kilmarnock–Carlisle line via Dumfries and numerous other stations.
- Borders Railway linking Edinburgh and Midlothian to a park-and-ride station at Tweedbank, Scottish Borders, via Stow and Galashiels.

=== Air and sea ===
There are no major airports within the area. The nearest international passenger airports are Glasgow Prestwick International Airport, Glasgow International Airport and Edinburgh Airport. Vehicle ferries operate between Stranraer and Cairnryan in Scotland and Belfast and Larne in Northern Ireland respectively.

== Recreation ==
=== Walking ===
There are numerous walks through the Southern Uplands. These include the Southern Upland Way, a 212-mile (341 km) coast to coast walk between Portpatrick in the west and Cockburnspath in the east.

=== Climbing ===
There is some good rock climbing in the Southern Uplands, particularly in the western portion, the Galloway Hills. The majority of the climbing is on good quality granite, often slabby and sometimes a bit broken in nature. In cold winters there is good ice climbing on the hills of Craignaw, Merrick and Cairnsmore of Fleet.

=== Mountain-biking ===
The 7stanes are seven mountain biking centres spanning the south of Scotland, from the heart of the Scottish Borders to Dumfries and Galloway. They are on Forestry Commission land and along with schemes in Wales are regarded as the benchmark by which further trails in the UK should be developed. They are known as the 7stanes because each venue features a 'stane' (Scots for stone) somewhere along the forest trails.

The Seven Stanes:

- Glentrool
- Kirroughtree, near Newton Stewart
- Dalbeattie
- Mabie
- Forest of Ae
- Tweed Valley: Glentress and Innerleithen
- Newcastleton

== Culture ==
The Southern Uplands and especially those areas adjacent to the Anglo-Scottish border have a troubled and bloody history. They were the scene of many raids, campaigns and battles, including the Battle of Ancrum Moor, the Battle of Nesbit Moor and the Battle of Philiphaugh. The Common Riding festivals of many Southern Upland towns such as Jedburgh, Kelso, Hawick, Peebles, Selkirk and Langholm recall this history, re-enacting the practice of riding the boundaries of the town to enable warning to be given of raids from the south.

This violent history is also commemorated in many Border ballads, another common theme of which is the supernatural, as in the ballads of Thomas the Rhymer and Tam Lin. Many Border ballads were collected by Sir Walter Scott in his Minstrelsy of the Scottish Border. Scott also portrayed the social history, folklore and traditions of the Southern Uplands in several of his prose and verse works (such as The Lay of the Last Minstrel), as did James Hogg, known as the Ettrick Shepherd.
