= Daer =

Daer may refer to:

- Lord Daer, a subsidiary title in the Peerage of Scotland, held by the Earl of Selkirk, used by courtesy by his eldest son.
- Daer Water, a tributary river of the River Clyde, Scotland.
  - Daer Reservoir a manmade loch on the above.
- Daer ales a beetle, the only species in the genus Daer
- Arthur Daer (1905–1980), cricketer
- Harry Daer (1918–1980), cricketer
