= Dollar Law =

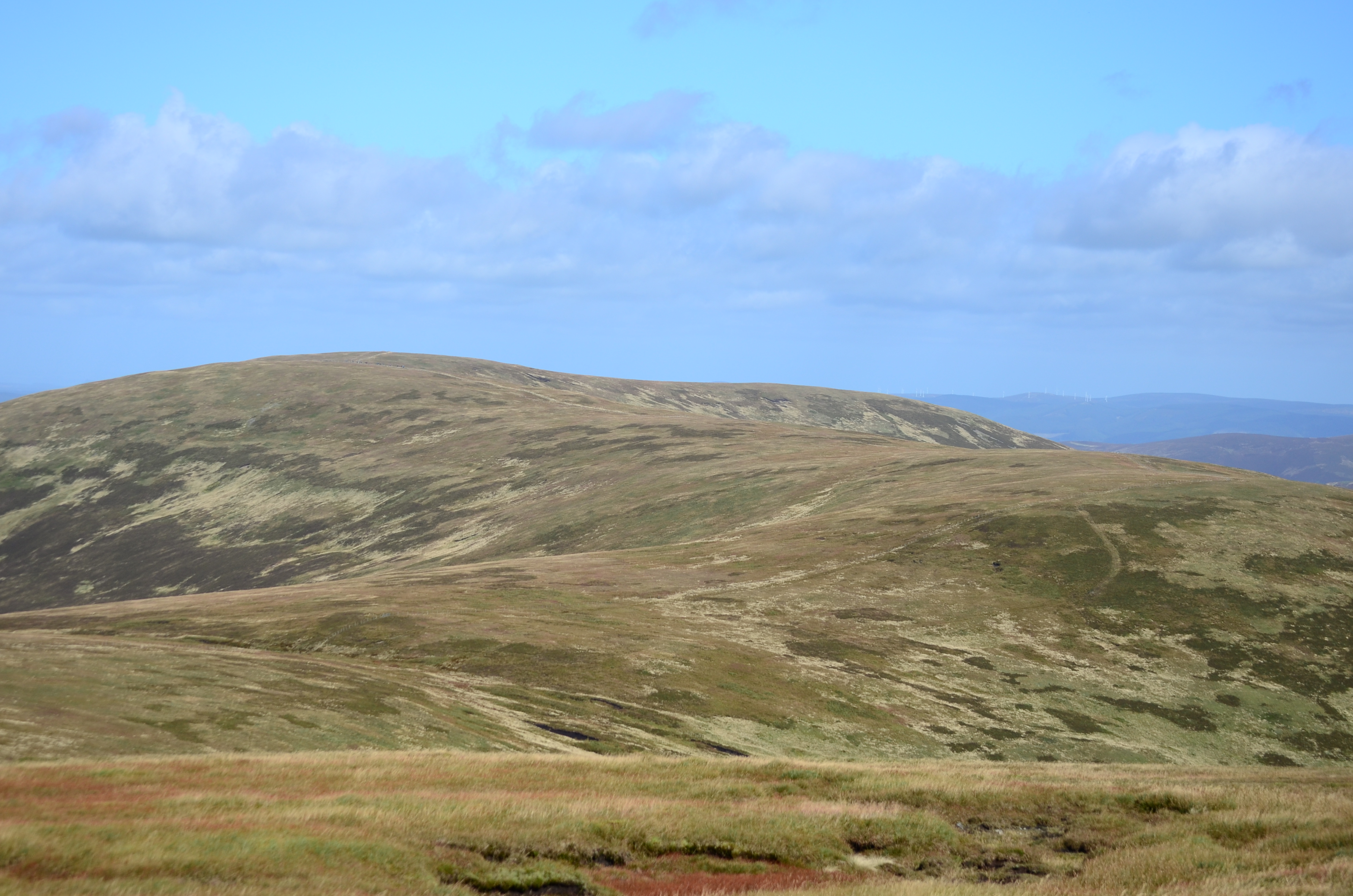

Highest point
- Elevation: 817 m (2,680 ft)
- Prominence: 70 m (230 ft)
- Listing: Tu,Sim,D,CT,DN

Naming
- English translation: Possibly Brythonic, Scots: High Valley Hill; Scottish Gaelic, Scots: Hill of the Place of the Haugh, Sorrow Hill

Geography
- Location: Scottish Borders, Scotland
- Parent range: Manor Hills, Southern Uplands
- OS grid: NT 17809 27831
- Topo map: OS Landranger 72

Dollar Law is a hill in the Manor Hills range, part of the Southern Uplands of Scotland. The third highest in the range and the Scottish Borders and fifth highest in southern Scotland, it is frequently climbed with its neighbours Broad Law and Cramalt Craig to the southwest from their direction or as a detour from the hills to the northwest near Drumelzier. Thief's Road, a historic heritage path, passes just south of the summit.

== Early settlement ==
The NE spur of Dollar Law into Manor Valley, known as The Bank, holds the remnants of an Iron Age settlement of around twelve structures, mostly within an oval enclosure. Later structures have partly destroyed the earlier remains but appear to indicate a continuous habitation until perhaps 1700. This is a Scheduled Ancient Monument.

== Subsidiary SMC summits ==
Summit	Height (m)	Listing
Fifescar Knowe	811	DT,sSim
Notman Law	734	DT,sSim
