= Scaw'd Law =

Hill in the Southern Uplands of Scotland

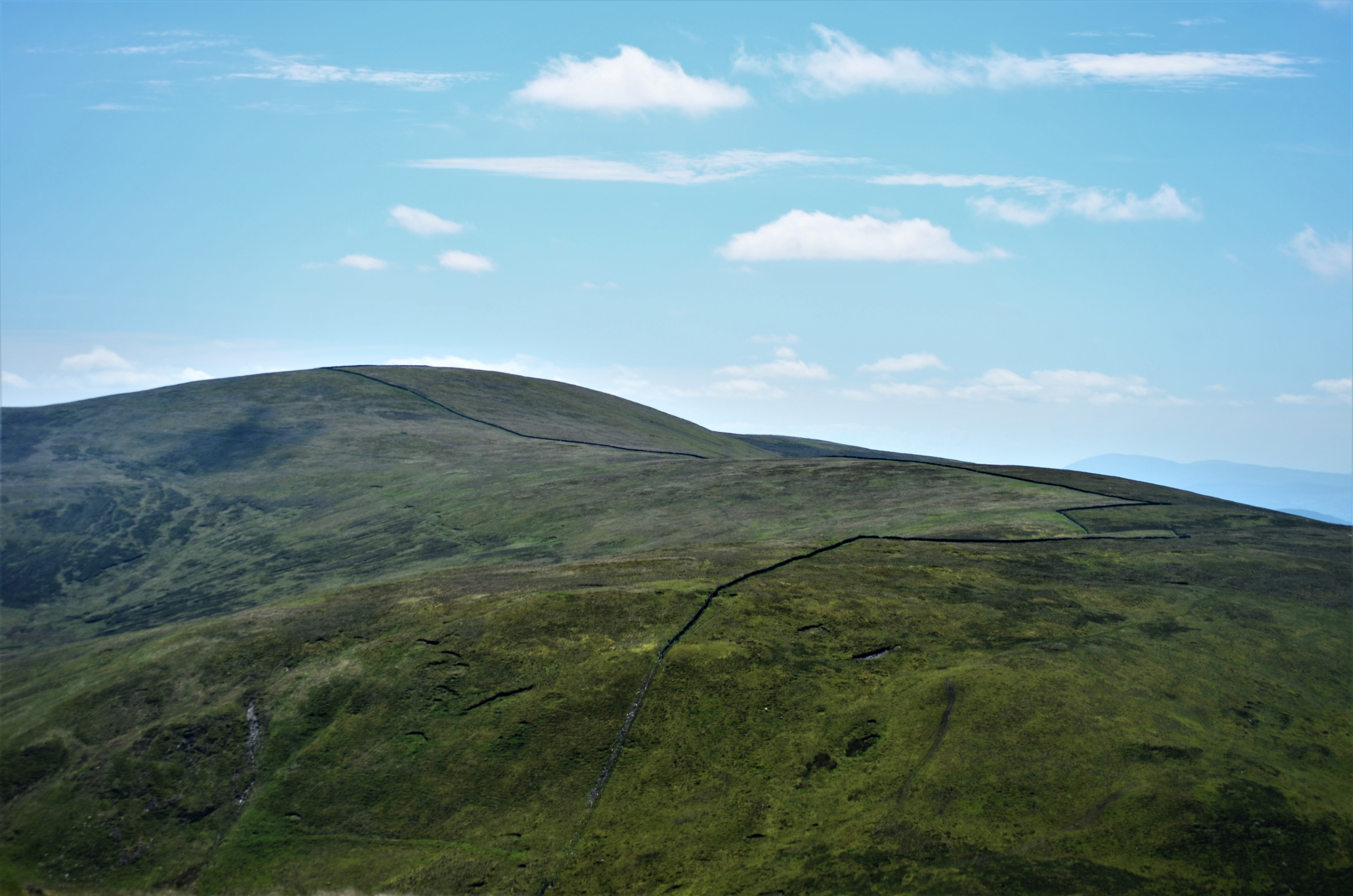

Highest point
- Elevation: 663 m (2,175 ft)
- Prominence: 58 m (190 ft)
- Listing: Tu,Sim,D,GT,DN

Geography
- Location: Southern Uplands, Scotland
- Parent range: Lowther Hills, Southern Uplands
- OS grid: NS 92219 03784
- Topo map: OS Landranger 78

Scaw'd Law is a hill in the Lowther Hills range, part of the Southern Uplands of Scotland. The Dumfries and Galloway-South Lanarkshire border runs along its summit, which is notable for having two similar rounded tops; the top 300m to the north is likely the true summit. Surrounded on most sides by tracks or roads, there are various routes to the summit, but the most frequent ascents are from Durisdeer or the Daer Reservoir.

== Subsidiary SMC Summits ==
Summit	Height (m)	Listing
Glenleith Fell	612	DT,sSim
