= Windy Standard =

Hill in Dumfries and Galloway, Scotland

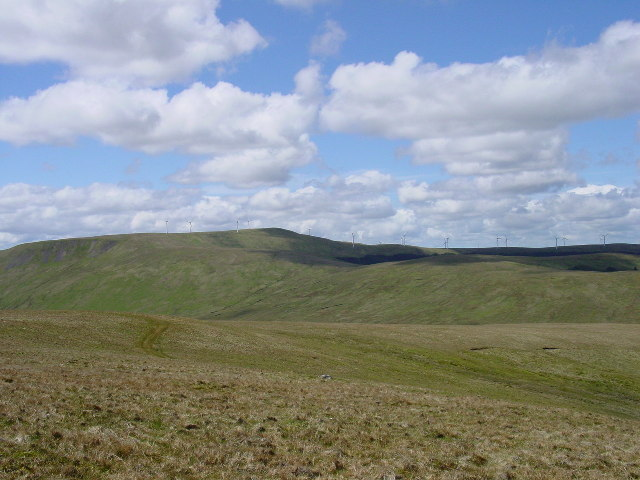

Highest point
- Elevation: 698 m (2,290 ft)
- Prominence: 212 m (696 ft)
- Listing: Ma,Hu,Tu,Sim,G,D,DN,Y
- Coordinates: 55°17′17″N 4°10′28″W

Geography
- Location: Dumfries and Galloway, Scotland
- Parent range: Carsphairn and Scaur Hills, Southern Uplands
- OS grid: NS 62014 01466
- Topo map: OS Landranger 77

Windy Standard is a hill in the Carsphairn and Scaur Hills range, part of the Southern Uplands of Scotland. It lies in Dumfries and Galloway, south of the town of New Cumnock. Once a remote hill to the northeast of Cairnsmore of Carsphairn, its summit area and slopes are now home to a series of expanding large windfarm sites, the earliest of which used to be the largest windfarm in Scotland.

== Subsidiary SMC Summits ==
Summit	Height (m)	Listing
Keoch Rig	612.4	DT
Dugland	611.5	Tu, Sim, DT, GT, DN
