= Black Law =

Black Law or Black Laws may refer to:

- The Indemnity Ordinance, 1975 in Bangladesh
- The Frontier Crimes Regulation in Pakistan (formerly British India)
- The 2020 Indian agriculture acts in India
- The Native Laws Amendment Act, 1952 of South Africa
- The Black Law Wind Farm in Scotland
- The Black Law (hill), a mountain in Scotland
- The Black Codes (United States)
