= Alhang =

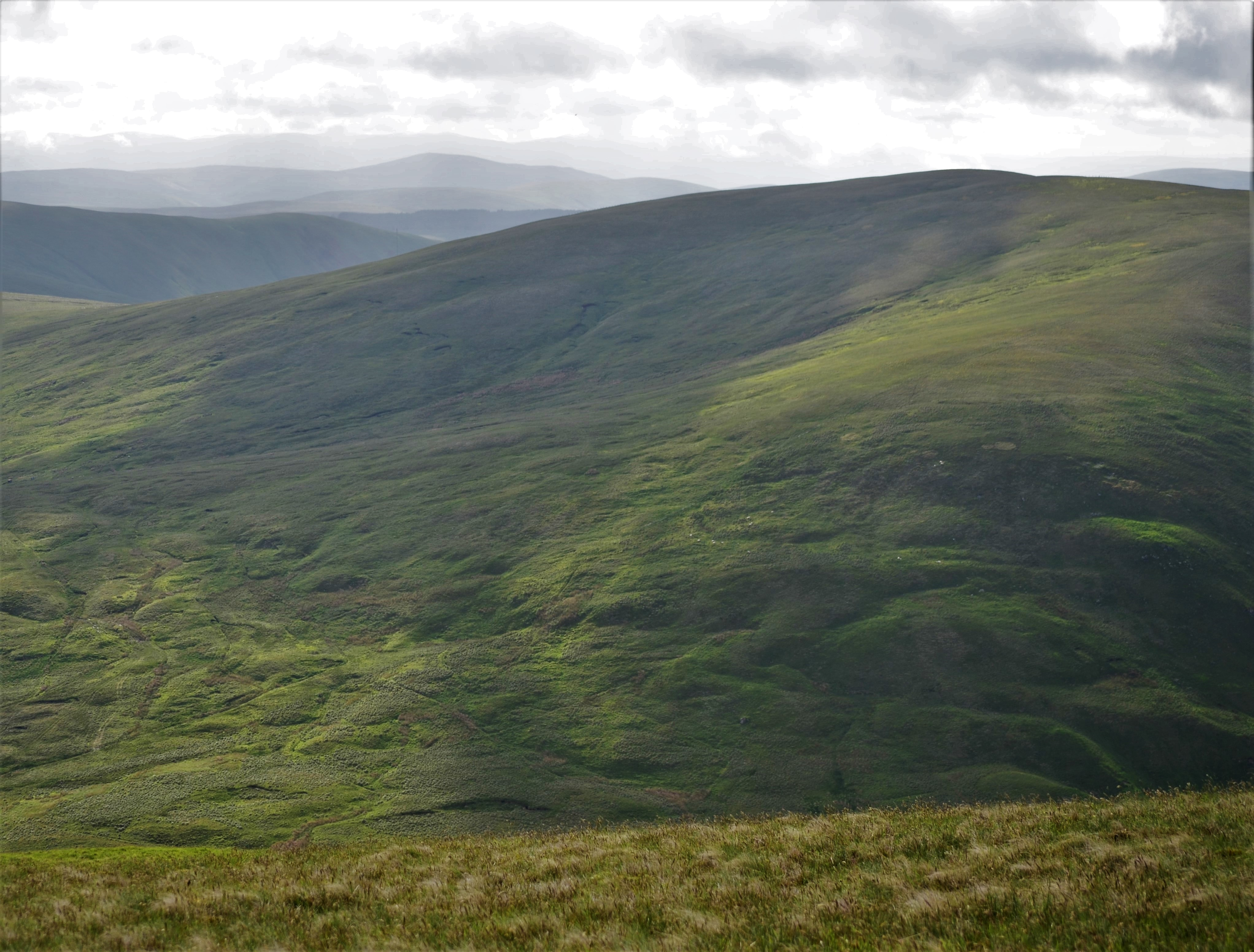

Highest point
- Elevation: 642 m (2,106 ft)
- Prominence: 90 m (300 ft)
- Listing: Tu,Sim,D,sHu,GT,DN

Naming
- English translation: Scottish Gaelic: possibly Cliff of the Corner

Geography
- Location: Dumfries and Galloway, Scotland
- Parent range: Carsphairn and Scaur Hills, Southern Uplands
- OS grid: NS 64229 01026
- Topo map: OS Landranger 77

Alhang is a hill in the Carsphairn and Scaur Hills range, part of the Southern Uplands of Scotland. It is the lowest Donald hill in the range; Meikledodd Hill is 1m higher. The northern slopes of the hill are the source of the River Afton. It is most easily climbed from the Water of Ken to the east or as a round from Glen Afton to the north.

== Subsidiary SMC Summits ==
Summit	Height (m)	Listing
Alwhat	628	Tu,Sim,DT,GT,DN
