= Earncraig Hill =

Hill in Scotland

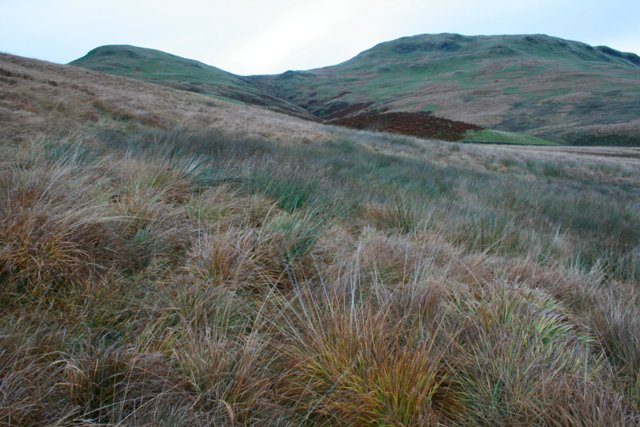

Highest point
- Elevation: 611 m (2,005 ft)
- Prominence: 109 m (358 ft)
- Listing: Hu,Tu,Sim,D,GT,DN,Y

Geography
- Location: Dumfries and Galloway, South Lanarkshire, Scotland
- Parent range: Lowther Hills, Southern Uplands
- OS grid: NS 97320 01372
- Topo map: OS Landranger 78

Earncraig Hill is a hill in the Lowther Hills range, part of the Southern Uplands of Scotland. The lowest and craggiest Donald hill in the range, it lies on the border between Dumfries and Galloway and South Lanarkshire, helping form the source of the River Clyde. It is most quickly ascended from the Daer Reservoir to the north or from Mitchellslacks to the south, passing by Burleywhag bothy.
