= Ballencleuch Law =

Hill in Scotland

Coordinates: 55.327237°N 3.679204°W

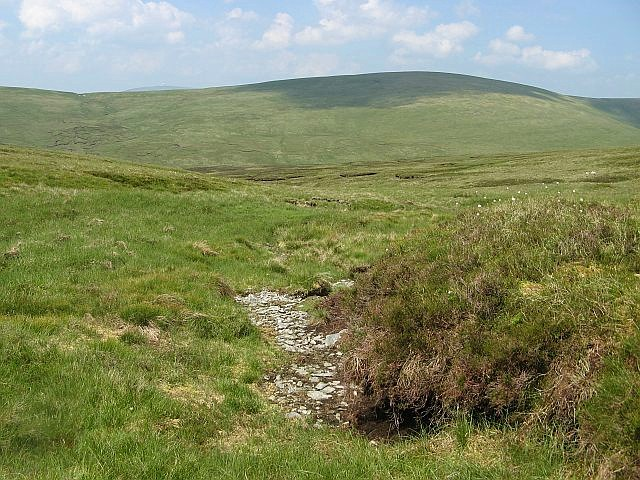

Highest point
- Elevation: 689 m (2,260 ft)
- Prominence: 204m
- Listing: Ma,Hu,Tu,Sim,G,D,DN,Y

Geography
- Location: South Lanarkshire, Scotland
- Parent range: Lowther Hills, Southern Uplands
- OS grid: NS 93562 04967
- Topo map: OS Landranger 78

Ballencleuch Law is a hill in the Lowther Hills range, part of the Southern Uplands of Scotland. Surrounded on most sides by tracks or roads, there are various routes to the summit, but the most frequent ascents are from Durisdeer or the Daer Reservoir.

== Subsidiary SMC Summits ==
Summit	Height (m)	Listing
Rodger Law	688	Tu,Sim,DT,GT,DN
