= Comb Law =

Hill in Scotland

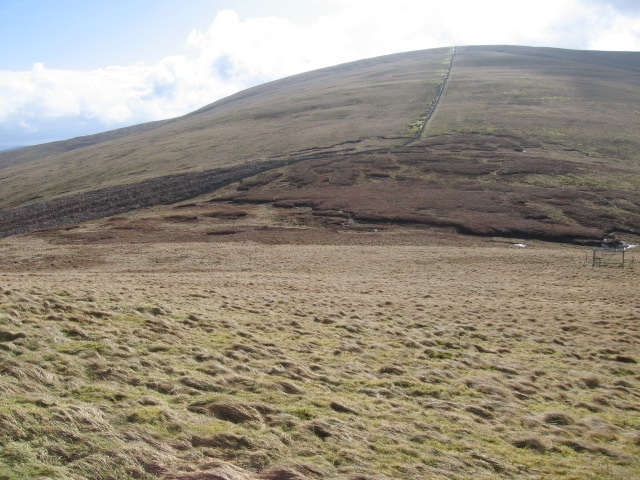

Highest point
- Elevation: 645 m (2,116 ft)
- Prominence: 59 m (194 ft)
- Listing: Tu,Sim,D,GT,DN

Geography
- Location: South Lanarkshire, Scotland
- Parent range: Lowther Hills, Southern Uplands
- OS grid: NS 94382 07369
- Topo map: OS Landranger 71, 78

Comb Law is a hill in the Lowther Hills range, part of the Southern Uplands of Scotland. The second lowest Donald in the area south of the A702 road, it is surrounded on most sides by tracks or roads and there are various routes to the summit, but the easiest ascent is from the Daer Reservoir.
