= Tarfessock =

Hill in Scotland

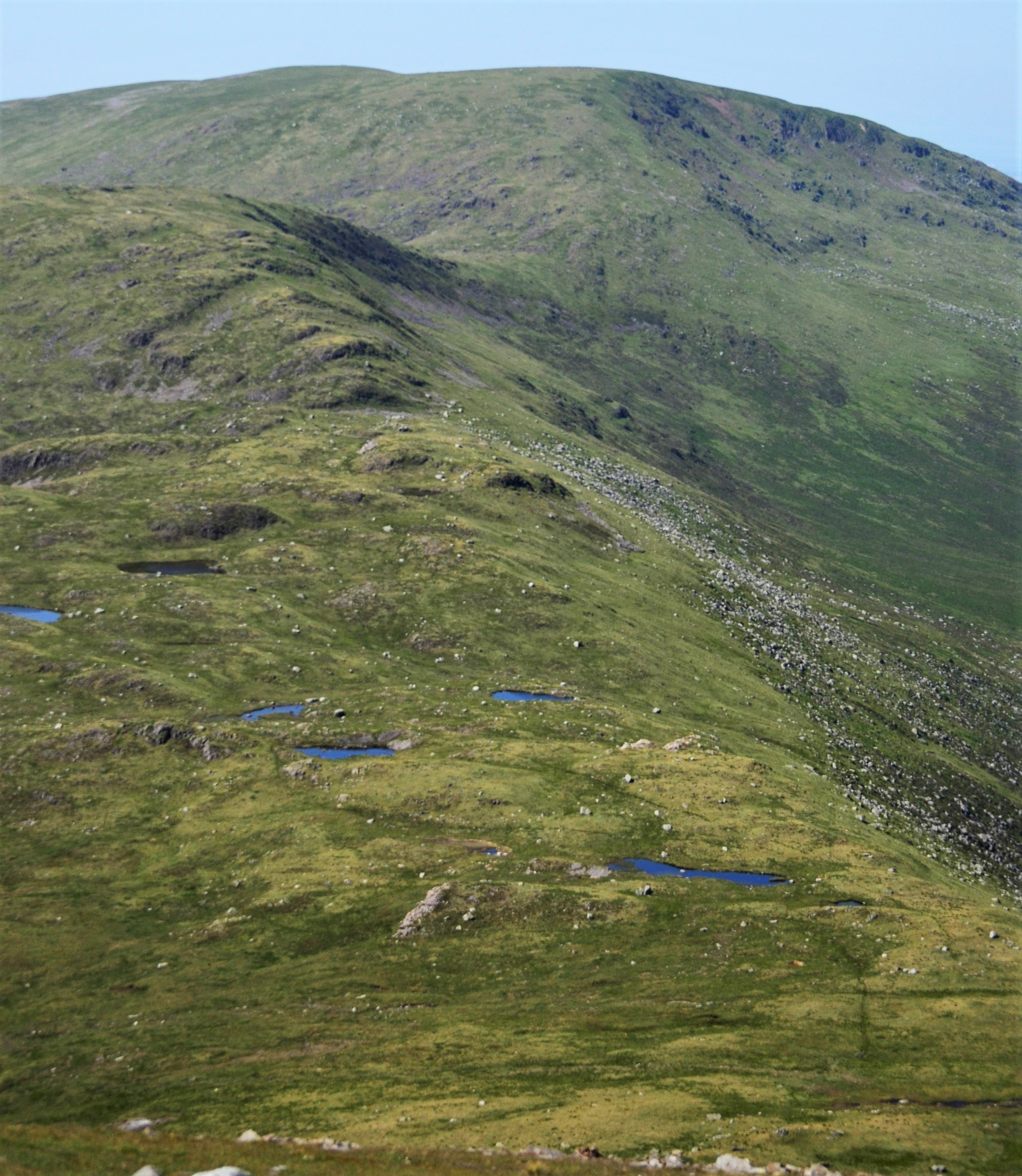

Highest point
- Elevation: 694.2 m (2,278 ft)
- Prominence: 68.5 m (225 ft)
- Listing: Tu,Sim,D,GT,DN

Naming
- Native name: Scottish Gaelic: A' Bheinn Mheadhanach

Geography
- Location: South Ayrshire, Scotland
- Parent range: Range of the Awful Hand, Galloway Hills, Southern Uplands
- OS grid: NX 40906 89186
- Topo map: OS Landranger 77

Tarfessock is a hill in the Range of the Awful Hand, a sub-range of the Galloway Hills range, part of the Southern Uplands of Scotland. A craggy hill, it is the lowest Donald in the range, being completely obscured by Kirriereoch Hill when viewed from the Merrick. A nearby south top is dotted with a series of lochans. A farmhouse of the same name is located to the west, which along with the hill was at one time the property of the Marquess of Ailsa.

The name Tarfessock may mean "the desolate conical hill" (Scottish Gaelic: An Tòrr Fàsach) or "conical hill of the barbs" (Tòrr na Feusaige), but in either case the name originally referred to the west shoulder of the mountain. Maps from the 1600s and 1700s show the summit as "Bin Meanach", i.e. A' Bheinn Mheadhanach, 'the middle hill' between the taller Kirriereoch Hill and Shalloch on Minnoch, both of which also have mismatched English names.

== Subsidiary SMC Summits ==
| Summit | Height (m) | Listing |
|---|---|---|
| Tarfessock South Top | 620 | DT,sSim |
