= Garelet Dod =

Hill in Scotland

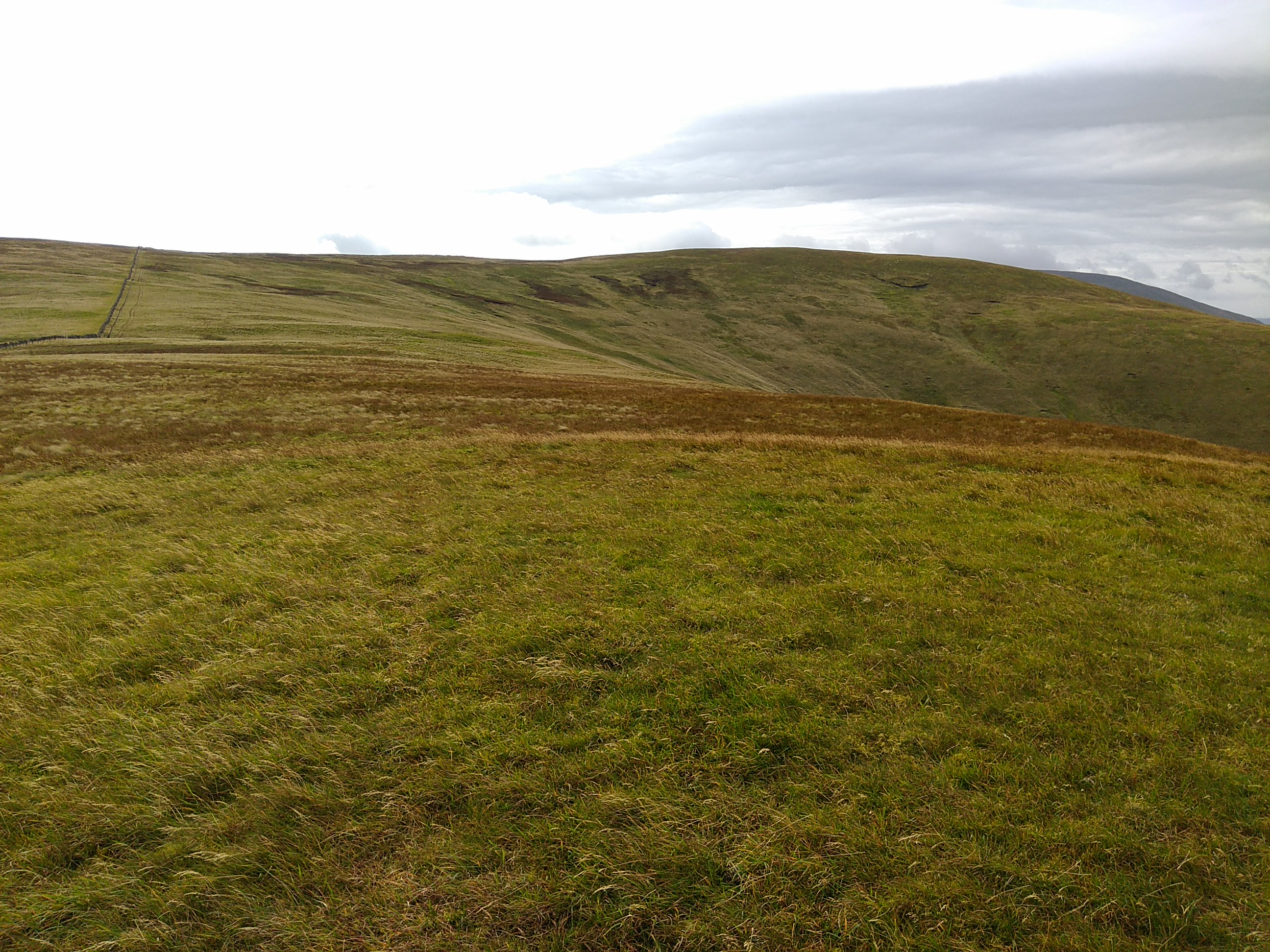

Highest point
- Elevation: 698 m (2,290 ft)
- Prominence: 126 m (413 ft)
- Listing: Hu,Tu,Sim, D,GT,DN,Y

Naming
- English translation: English and possibly Welsh or Scottish Gaelic: Rounded Summit of the Rough Slope

Geography
- Location: Scottish Borders, Scotland
- Parent range: Moffat Hills, Southern Uplands
- OS grid: NT 12600 17252
- Topo map: OS Landranger 78

Garelet Dod is a hill in the Moffat Hills range, part of the Southern Uplands of Scotland. A broad, flat summit like its neighbour Cape Law, it is commonly ascended from Talla Linfoots to the north on the way to the higher summits to the southwest and southeast, usually as part of a round.
