= List of Donald mountains =

Scottish lowland peaks above 2,000 ft

Donald
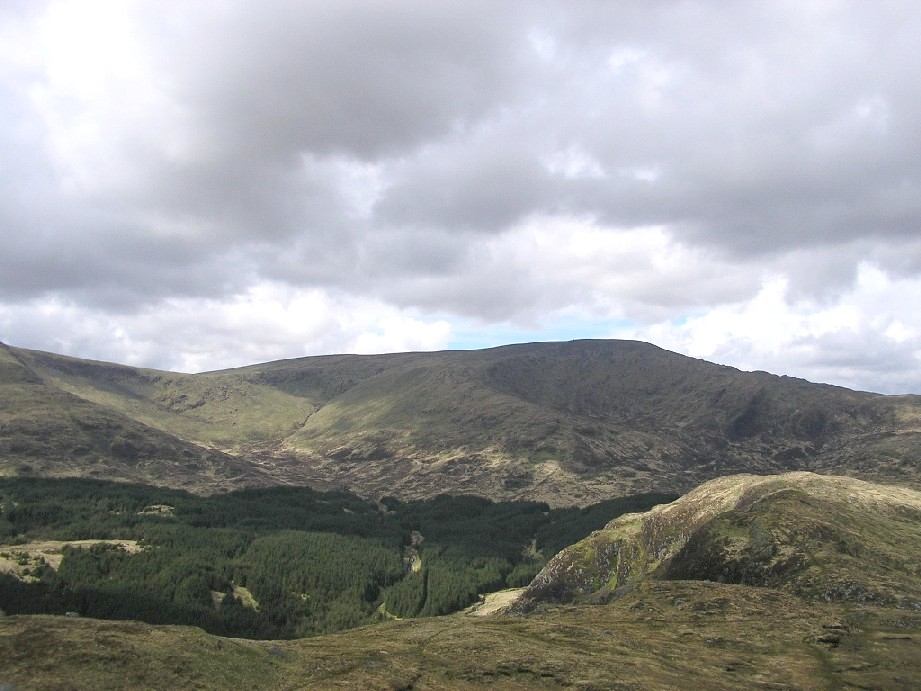
- Merrick in the Southern Uplands is the Donald with both the greatest height and the greatest prominence, and is also a Corbett.

Highest point
- Elevation: over 2,000 ft (609.6 m)
- Prominence: complex formula but Donald Hills have over 100 feet (30.5 m)

Geography
- Location: 140 SMC Donalds * 89 Scottish Lowland Donald Hills * 51 Scottish Lowland Donald Tops 118 New Donalds * 89 Scottish Lowland Donald Hills * 29 Scottish Lowland Donald Tops

This is a list of Donald mountains in Scotland by height. Donalds were defined in 1935 by Scottish Mountaineering Club ("SMC") member Percy Donald, as Scottish Lowlands mountains over 2,000 feet (609.6 m) in height, the general requirement to be called a "mountain" in the British Isles, and over 100 feet (30.5 m) in prominence, and which also had "sufficient topographical merit" that he outlined in a complex formula.

This formula splits Donalds into Donald Hills and Donald Tops. The SMC define Donald Tops as: "elevations in the Scottish Lowlands of at least 2,000 feet [610 m] in height with a drop of at least 50 feet [15 m] between each elevation and any higher elevation. Further, elevations separated from higher elevations by a drop of less than 100 feet [30 m] are required to have "sufficient topographical merit". In addition, the SMC define Donald Hills as being: "defined from Donald Tops, where a Hill is the highest Top with a separation of 17 units or less. A unit is either 1/12 mile [130 m] along a Top's connecting ridge or 50 feet [15 m] in elevation between the Top and its connecting bealach/col. The separation is the sum of these two measures."

The SMC note that: "Percy Donald's original Tables are seen as a complete entity, unlike the Munros, Corbetts and Grahams"; thus many Donalds are also Corbetts or Grahams. Percy Donald's original 1935 list recorded 133 Donalds, (Note: Donald's Tables as published by the SMC (initially in their 1935 Journal, subsequently as lesser heights in Munro's Tables). Percy Donald's criteria defining 'Hills' and 'Tops' produced an initial split of 86 Hills, and 133 total Donalds.) however since 1997, (Note: Up until the 1997 edition of the Munro's Tables, the SMC excluded the Donalds of the Artney group (Map Section 26), but they adopted Alan Dawson's criteria that the geographic location as south of the Highland Boundary Fault; since 1997, the SMC have not changed the list of Donalds.) the SMC records 140 Donalds in the Scottish lowlands, split into 89 Donald Hills and 51 Donald Tops. While the prominence of Donald Hills is over 100 feet (30.5 m), the prominence of a Donald Top can range from 16 feet (4.9 m), as in the case of Cairn Hill West Top, to 220 feet (67.1 m), in the case of Beninner.

New Donalds were introduced by Alan Dawson in his 1995 book, The Grahams and the New Donalds, with a prominence threshold of 30 m (98.4 ft), and that the location was south of the Highland Boundary Fault; there are 118 New Donalds, and while all Donald Hills are New Donalds, 22 Donald Tops are not. Climbers who climb all SMC Donalds are called Donaldists, the first being Percy Donald on 23 May 1933; a list is maintained. The most recent material change was on 18 February 2021, when Dugland was reinstated as a Donald Top.

== Donald mountains by height ==
This list is from the Database of British and Irish Hills ("DoBIH") in October 2018, and are peaks the DoBIH marks as being Donalds ("D" and "DT"). (Note: The Database of British and Irish Hills ("DoBIH") is the most referenced database for the classification of peaks in the British Isles, and the DoBIH is licensed under a "Creative Commons Attribution 3.0 Unported License".) The SMC does not update the list of Donalds (they are fixed), however the DoBIH also updates their measurements as more surveys are recorded, so these tables should not be amended or updated unless the entire DoBIH data is re-downloaded again.

One of the 22 Donalds not classed as a New Donald; being a Donald Top whose prominence is below 30 m (98.4 ft).
Also classed as a Corbett ("C" § DoBIH codes).
Also classed as a Graham ("G" § DoBIH codes).

Scottish Mountaineering Club ("SMC") Donald Hills and Donald Tops, ranked by height (DoBIH, October 2018)
Height Rank	Name	Sub-Class	Parent (SMC Def) (Note: In the DoBIH, this is the "Parent (SMC)" code, which the DoBIH define as follows: "The hill number and name of the Munro or Donald to which Munro Tops and Donald Tops are linked. For Munro Tops the hierarchy is shown in Munro's Tables. For a few tops the parent is topographically incorrect on current mapping (i.e. not the hill linked by the highest col), e.g. the SMC parent of 527 Carn Lochan is Cairn Gorm rather than Ben Macdui, the parent of 1015 Stob Cadha Gobhlach is Sgurr Fiona instead of Bidein a' Ghlas Thuill, and the parent of 811 Ciste Dhubh is Mam Sodhail not Carn Eighe. For Donald Tops the 1953, 1969 and 1974 editions of Munro's Tables show the hierarchy correctly but later editions do not. For example, hill 1652 Ben Ever is a top of Ben Cleuch but from 1981 onwards is shown underneath Blairdenon Hill, and hill 1897 Coomb Dodd is shown above rather than below its parent Hillshaw Head. Parents of former Section 13—Appendix hills and the Glen Artney hills that entered the Tables in 1997 have been assigned by us.")	Section / Region	County	Height (m)	Prom. (m)	Height (ft)	Prom. (ft)	Topo Map	OS Grid Reference	Classification (§ DoBIH codes)
1	Merrick	Donald Hill		27B: Carrick and Galloway	Dumfries and Galloway	843	705	2,766	2,313	77	NX427855	Ma,C,Sim,D, CoH,CoU,CoA
2	Broad Law	Donald Hill		28B: The River Tweed to the English Border	Scottish Borders	840	653	2,756	2,142	72	NT146235	Ma,C,Sim,D, CoH,CoU,CoA
3	Cramalt Craig	Donald Hill		28B: The River Tweed to the English Border	Scottish Borders	830	147	2,724	484	72	NT168247	Hu,Sim,D,sMa,xC
4	White Coomb	Donald Hill		28B: The River Tweed to the English Border	Dumfries and Galloway	821	374	2,694	1,227	79	NT163150	Ma,C,Sim,D,CoH
5	Dollar Law	Donald Hill		28B: The River Tweed to the English Border	Scottish Borders	817	70	2,680	230	72	NT178278	Sim,D
6	Corserine	Donald Hill		27B: Carrick and Galloway	Dumfries and Galloway	814	488	2,671	1,601	77	NX497870	Ma,C,Sim,D
7	Fifescar Knowe	Donald Top	Dollar Law	28B: The River Tweed to the English Border	Scottish Borders	811	26	2,661	85	72	NT175270	DT,sSim
8	Hart Fell	Donald Hill		28B: The River Tweed to the English Border	Dumfries and Galloway/Scottish Borders	808	200	2,651	656	78	NT113135	Ma,C,Sim,D
9	Carlin's Cairn	Donald Hill		27B: Carrick and Galloway	Dumfries and Galloway	807	99	2,648	325	77	NX496883	Sim,D,sHu
10	Lochcraig Head	Donald Hill		28B: The River Tweed to the English Border	Scottish Borders	801	108	2,627	354	79	NT166177	Hu,Sim,D
11	Firthhope Rig	Donald Top	White Coomb	28B: The River Tweed to the English Border	Dumfries and Galloway/Scottish Borders	800	26	2,625	85	79	NT153153	DT,sSim
12	Cairnsmore of Carsphairn	Donald Hill		27C: The Glenkens to Annandale	Dumfries and Galloway	797	582	2,615	1,909	77	NX594979	Ma,C,Sim,D
13	Kirriereoch Hill	Donald Hill		27B: Carrick and Galloway	Dumfries and Galloway	787	150	2,581	493	77	NX420869	Ma,Sim,D,xC
14	Molls Cleuch Dod	Donald Hill		28B: The River Tweed to the English Border	Scottish Borders	785	39	2,575	128	79	NT151179	Sim,D
15	Great Hill	Donald Top	White Coomb	28B: The River Tweed to the English Border	Scottish Borders	775	28	2,542	92	78	NT145163	DT,sSim
16	Shalloch on Minnoch	Donald Hill		27B: Carrick and Galloway	South Ayrshire	774	194	2,540	635	77	NX407905	Ma,C,Sim,D
17	Nickies Knowe	Donald Top	Lochcraig Head	28B: The River Tweed to the English Border	Scottish Borders	761	29	2,496	94	79	NT163191	DT,sSim
18	Carrifran Gans	Donald Top	White Coomb	28B: The River Tweed to the English Border	Dumfries and Galloway	757	42	2,484	138	79	NT159138	Sim,DT
19	Meikle Millyea	Donald Hill		27B: Carrick and Galloway	Dumfries and Galloway	749	121	2,456	397	77	NX516825	Hu,Sim,D
20	Culter Fell	Donald Hill		28B: The River Tweed to the English Border	Scottish Borders/South Lanarkshire	748	350	2,454	1,148	72	NT052290	Ma,G,Sim,D, CoH,CoU
21	Under Saddle Yoke	Donald Hill		28B: The River Tweed to the English Border	Dumfries and Galloway	745	128	2,444	420	78	NT142126	Hu,Sim,D
22	Dun Rig	Donald Hill		28B: The River Tweed to the English Border	Scottish Borders	744	243	2,441	797	73	NT253315	Ma,G,Sim,D
23	Cairn Hill West Top	Donald Top	The Cheviot	28B: The River Tweed to the English Border	Northumberland/Scottish Borders	743	5	2,438	16	80	NT895193	DT,CoH,xN
24	Milldown	Donald Hill		27B: Carrick and Galloway	Dumfries and Galloway	738	90	2,421	295	77	NX511839	Sim,D,sHu
25	Pykestone Hill	Donald Hill		28B: The River Tweed to the English Border	Scottish Borders	737	133	2,418	436	72	NT173312	Hu,Sim,D
26	Carlavin Hill	Donald Top	Molls Cleuch Dod	28B: The River Tweed to the English Border	Scottish Borders	736	23	2,415	75	78	NT142188	DT,sSim
27	Saddle Yoke	Donald Top	Under Saddle Yoke	28B: The River Tweed to the English Border	Dumfries and Galloway	736	30	2,413	99	78	NT144123	Sim,DT
28	Notman Law	Donald Top	Dollar Law	28B: The River Tweed to the English Border	Scottish Borders	734	20	2,408	66	72	NT185260	DT,sSim
29	Green Lowther	Donald Hill		27C: The Glenkens to Annandale	South Lanarkshire	732	424	2,402	1,391	71 78	NS900120	Ma,G,Sim,D
30	Glenrath Heights	Donald Hill		28B: The River Tweed to the English Border	Scottish Borders	732	87	2,402	285	73	NT241322	Sim,D
31	Swatte Fell	Donald Hill		28B: The River Tweed to the English Border	Dumfries and Galloway	730	36	2,395	119	78	NT118113	Sim,D
32	Lowther Hill	Donald Hill		27C: The Glenkens to Annandale	Dumfries and Galloway/South Lanarkshire	725	37	2,379	121	71 78	NS890107	Sim,D
33	Nether Coomb Craig	Donald Top	Swatte Fell	28B: The River Tweed to the English Border	Dumfries and Galloway	724	29	2,376	95	78	NT129109	DT,sSim
34	Falcon Craig	Donald Top	Swatte Fell	28B: The River Tweed to the English Border	Dumfries and Galloway	724	27	2,374	89	78	NT122127	DT,sSim
35	Cape Law	Donald Hill		28B: The River Tweed to the English Border	Scottish Borders	722	93	2,369	305	78	NT131150	Sim,D,sHu
36	Ben Cleuch	Donald Hill		26A: Central Scotland from Dumbarton to Montrose	Clackmannanshire	721	595	2,365	1,952	58	NN902006	Ma,G,Sim,D, CoH,CoU
37	Benyellary	Donald Top	Merrick	27B: Carrick and Galloway	Dumfries and Galloway	719	57	2,359	187	77	NX414839	Sim,DT
38	The Scrape	Donald Top	Pykestone Hill	28B: The River Tweed to the English Border	Scottish Borders	719	42	2,359	138	72	NT176324	Sim,DT
39	Middle Hill	Donald Hill		28B: The River Tweed to the English Border	Scottish Borders	717	42	2,353	137	72	NT159294	Sim,D
40	Lamachan Hill	Donald Hill		27B: Carrick and Galloway	Dumfries and Galloway	717	453	2,352	1,486	77	NX435769	Ma,G,Sim,D
41	Millfire	Donald Top	Milldown	27B: Carrick and Galloway	Dumfries and Galloway	716	24	2,349	79	77	NX508847	DT,sSim
42	Tinto	Donald Hill		27A: Ayr to the River Clyde	South Lanarkshire	711	442	2,333	1,450	72	NS953343	Ma,G,Sim,D
43	Cairnsmore of Fleet	Donald Hill		27B: Carrick and Galloway	Dumfries and Galloway	711	522	2,333	1,713	83	NX501670	Ma,G,Sim,D
44	Beninner	Donald Top	Cairnsmore of Carsphairn	27C: The Glenkens to Annandale	Dumfries and Galloway	710	67	2,329	220	77	NX605971	Sim,DT
45	Blackcraig Hill	Donald Hill		27C: The Glenkens to Annandale	East Ayrshire	701	236	2,300	774	71 77	NS647064	Ma,G,Sim,D,CoU
46	Windy Standard	Donald Hill		27C: The Glenkens to Annandale	Dumfries and Galloway	698	212	2,290	696	77	NS620014	Ma,G,Sim,D
47	Garelet Dod	Donald Hill		28B: The River Tweed to the English Border	Scottish Borders	698	126	2,290	413	78	NT126172	Hu,Sim,D
48	Black Law	Donald Hill		28B: The River Tweed to the English Border	Scottish Borders	698	103	2,290	338	73	NT222279	Hu,Sim,D
49	Queensberry	Donald Hill		27C: The Glenkens to Annandale	Dumfries and Galloway	697	363	2,287	1,191	78	NX989997	Ma,G,Sim,D
50	Tarfessock	Donald Hill		27B: Carrick and Galloway	South Ayrshire	696	69	2,285	225	77	NX409891	Sim,D
51	Chapelgill Hill	Donald Hill		28B: The River Tweed to the English Border	Scottish Borders	696	104	2,283	341	72	NT067303	Hu,Sim,D
52	Meaul	Donald Hill		27B: Carrick and Galloway	Dumfries and Galloway	695	74	2,280	243	77	NX500909	Sim,D
53	Mullwharchar	Donald Hill		27B: Carrick and Galloway	East Ayrshire	692	187	2,270	614	77	NX454866	Ma,G,Sim,D
54	Ettrick Pen	Donald Hill		28B: The River Tweed to the English Border	Dumfries and Galloway/Scottish Borders	692	358	2,270	1,175	79	NT199076	Ma,G,Sim,D
55	Talla Cleuch Head	Donald Hill		28B: The River Tweed to the English Border	Scottish Borders	691	63	2,267	207	72	NT133218	Sim,D
56	Erie Hill	Donald Hill		28B: The River Tweed to the English Border	Scottish Borders	690	92	2,264	302	78	NT124187	Sim,D,sHu
57	Ballencleuch Law	Donald Hill		27C: The Glenkens to Annandale	South Lanarkshire	689	204	2,260	669	78	NS935049	Ma,G,Sim,D
58	Gathersnow Hill	Donald Hill		28B: The River Tweed to the English Border	Scottish Borders/South Lanarkshire	688	210	2,257	689	72	NT058256	Ma,G,Sim,D
59	Loch Fell	Donald Hill		28B: The River Tweed to the English Border	Dumfries and Galloway	688	124	2,257	407	79	NT170047	Hu,Sim,D
60	Rodger Law	Donald Top	Ballencleuch Law	27C: The Glenkens to Annandale	South Lanarkshire	688	42	2,257	138	71 78	NS945058	Sim,DT
61	Laird's Cleuch Rig	Donald Top	Erie Hill	28B: The River Tweed to the English Border	Scottish Borders	684	51	2,244	167	78	NT124196	Sim,DT
62	Blacklorg Hill	Donald Hill		27C: The Glenkens to Annandale	Dumfries and Galloway/East Ayrshire	681	148	2,234	486	77	NS653042	Hu,Sim,D,sMa
63	Garelet Hill	Donald Top	Erie Hill	28B: The River Tweed to the English Border	Scottish Borders	681	25	2,234	82	72	NT124201	DT,sSim
64	Capel Fell	Donald Hill		28B: The River Tweed to the English Border	Dumfries and Galloway/Scottish Borders	678	159	2,224	522	79	NT163069	Ma,G,Sim,D
65	Andrewhinney Hill	Donald Hill		28B: The River Tweed to the English Border	Dumfries and Galloway/Scottish Borders	677	194	2,222	636	79	NT197138	Ma,G,Sim,D
66	Dun Law	Donald Hill		27C: The Glenkens to Annandale	South Lanarkshire	677	105	2,221	344	71 78	NS916136	Hu,Sim,D
67	Larg Hill	Donald Hill		27B: Carrick and Galloway	Dumfries and Galloway	676	72	2,218	236	77	NX424756	Sim,D
68	Stob Law	Donald Hill		28B: The River Tweed to the English Border	Scottish Borders	676	67	2,218	220	73	NT230332	Sim,D
69	Cardon Hill	Donald Top	Chapelgill Hill	28B: The River Tweed to the English Border	Scottish Borders	675	37	2,215	121	72	NT065314	Sim,DT
70	Black Cleuch Hill	Donald Top	Black Law	28B: The River Tweed to the English Border	Scottish Borders	675	26	2,215	85	73	NT222290	DT,sSim
71	Curleywee	Donald Hill		27B: Carrick and Galloway	Dumfries and Galloway	674	119	2,211	390	77	NX454769	Hu,Sim,D
72	Wedder Law	Donald Hill		27C: The Glenkens to Annandale	Dumfries and Galloway/South Lanarkshire	672	137	2,205	449	78	NS938025	Hu,Sim,D
73	West Knowe	Donald Top	Loch Fell	28B: The River Tweed to the English Border	Dumfries and Galloway	672	30	2,205	98	79	NT162052	Sim,DT
74	Andrew Gannel Hill	Donald Top	Ben Cleuch	26A: Central Scotland from Dumbarton to Montrose	Clackmannanshire	670	47	2,198	155	58	NN918006	Sim,DT
75	Gana Hill	Donald Hill		27C: The Glenkens to Annandale	Dumfries and Galloway/South Lanarkshire	668	117	2,192	384	78	NS954010	Hu,Sim,D
76	Drumelzier Law	Donald Hill		28B: The River Tweed to the English Border	Scottish Borders	668	95	2,192	312	72	NT149312	Sim,D,sHu
77	Din Law	Donald Top	Cape Law	28B: The River Tweed to the English Border	Scottish Borders	667	53	2,188	174	78	NT124157	Sim,DT
78	Uamh Bheag	Donald Hill		26B: Central Scotland from Dumbarton to Montrose	Perth and Kinross/Stirling	666	325	2,184	1,066	57	NN691118	Ma,G,Sim,D
79	Wind Fell	Donald Hill		28B: The River Tweed to the English Border	Dumfries and Galloway/Scottish Borders	665	90	2,182	295	79	NT178061	Sim,D,sHu
80	Bodesbeck Law	Donald Hill		28B: The River Tweed to the English Border	Dumfries and Galloway/Scottish Borders	664	101	2,179	332	79	NT169104	Hu,Sim,D
81	Scaw'd Law	Donald Hill		27C: The Glenkens to Annandale	Dumfries and Galloway/South Lanarkshire	663	58	2,175	190	78	NS922037	Sim,D
82	Birkscairn Hill	Donald Hill		28B: The River Tweed to the English Border	Scottish Borders	661	62	2,169	203	73	NT274331	Sim,D
83	Caerloch Dhu	Donald Top	Shalloch on Minnoch	27B: Carrick and Galloway	South Ayrshire	659	31	2,163	100	77	NX400920	Sim,DT
84	Windlestraw Law	Donald Hill		28A: Firth of Forth to the River Tweed	Scottish Borders	659	461	2,163	1,512	73	NT371430	Ma,G,Sim,D
85	Cairnsgarroch	Donald Hill		27B: Carrick and Galloway	Dumfries and Galloway	659	105	2,162	344	77	NX515913	Hu,Sim,D
86	Millfore	Donald Hill		27B: Carrick and Galloway	Dumfries and Galloway	657	250	2,156	820	77	NX478754	Ma,G,Sim,D
87	Knee of Cairnsmore	Donald Top	Cairnsmore of Fleet	27B: Carrick and Galloway	Dumfries and Galloway	657	38	2,156	125	83	NX509656	Sim,DT
88	Bareback Knowe	Donald Top	Windlestraw Law	28A: Firth of Forth to the River Tweed	Scottish Borders	656	29	2,152	96	73	NT362420	DT,sSim
89	Hillshaw Head	Donald Hill		28B: The River Tweed to the English Border	Scottish Borders/South Lanarkshire	652	54	2,139	177	72	NT048246	Sim,D
90	Blackhope Scar	Donald Hill		28A: Firth of Forth to the River Tweed	Midlothian/Scottish Borders	651	282	2,136	925	73	NT315483	Ma,G,Sim,D, CoH,CoU,CoA
91	Moorbrock Hill	Donald Hill		27C: The Glenkens to Annandale	Dumfries and Galloway	650	113	2,133	371	77	NX620983	Hu,Sim,D
92	King's Seat Hill	Donald Hill		26A: Central Scotland from Dumbarton to Montrose	Clackmannanshire	648	135	2,126	443	58	NS933999	Hu,Sim,D
93	Craignaw	Donald Hill		27B: Carrick and Galloway	Dumfries and Galloway	645	151	2,116	495	77	NX459833	Ma,G,Sim,D
94	Tarmangie Hill	Donald Hill		26A: Central Scotland from Dumbarton to Montrose	Clackmannanshire/Perth and Kinross	645	78	2,116	256	58	NN942014	Sim,D
95	Comb Law	Donald Hill		27C: The Glenkens to Annandale	South Lanarkshire	645	59	2,116	194	71 78	NS943073	Sim,D
96	Smidhope Hill	Donald Top	Capel Fell	28B: The River Tweed to the English Border	Dumfries and Galloway/Scottish Borders	644	33	2,113	110	79	NT168076	Sim,DT
97	Greenside Law	Donald Hill		28B: The River Tweed to the English Border	Scottish Borders	643	77	2,110	253	72	NT197256	Sim,D
98	Whitewisp Hill	Donald Top	Tarmangie Hill	26A: Central Scotland from Dumbarton to Montrose	Clackmannanshire	643	32	2,110	105	58	NN955013	Sim,DT
99	Meikledodd Hill	Donald Top	Blacklorg Hill	27C: The Glenkens to Annandale	Dumfries and Galloway	643	55	2,110	180	77	NS660027	Sim,DT
100	Alhang	Donald Hill		27C: The Glenkens to Annandale	Dumfries and Galloway/East Ayrshire	642	90	2,106	295	77	NS642010	Sim,D,sHu
101	Clockmore	Donald Top	Cramalt Craig	28B: The River Tweed to the English Border	Scottish Borders	641	39	2,103	128	72	NT182228	Sim,DT
102	Coomb Hill	Donald Top	Gathersnow Hill	28B: The River Tweed to the English Border	Scottish Borders	640	36	2,100	118	72	NT069263	Sim,DT
103	Hunt Law	Donald Top	Cramalt Craig	28B: The River Tweed to the English Border	Scottish Borders	639	55	2,096	180	72	NT149264	Sim,DT
104	The Law	Donald Top	Ben Cleuch, Ochil Hills	26A: Central Scotland from Dumbarton to Montrose	Clackmannanshire	638	20	2,094	67	58	NS910996	DT,sSim
105	Croft Head	Donald Hill		28B: The River Tweed to the English Border	Dumfries and Galloway	637	194	2,090	636	79	NT153056	Ma,G,Sim,D
106	Whitehope Heights	Donald Hill		28B: The River Tweed to the English Border	Dumfries and Galloway/Scottish Borders	637	109	2,090	358	78	NT095139	Hu,Sim,D
107	Taberon Law	Donald Top	Middle Hill	28B: The River Tweed to the English Border	Scottish Borders	637	28	2,089	93	72	NT146288	DT,sSim
108	Coomb Dod	Donald Top	Hillshaw Head	28B: The River Tweed to the English Border	Scottish Borders/South Lanarkshire	635	33	2,083	108	72	NT046238	Sim,DT
109	Hopetoun Craig	Donald Top	Wind Fell	28B: The River Tweed to the English Border	Dumfries and Galloway/Scottish Borders	632	36	2,073	118	79	NT187067	Sim,DT
110	Beinn nan Eun	Donald Hill		26B: Central Scotland from Dumbarton to Montrose	Perth and Kinross	631	142	2,070	466	57	NN723131	Hu,Sim,D,sMa
111	Blairdenon Hill	Donald Hill		26A: Central Scotland from Dumbarton to Montrose	Clackmannanshire/Stirling	631	94	2,070	308	58	NN865018	Sim,D,sHu
112	East Mount Lowther	Donald Hill		27C: The Glenkens to Annandale	Dumfries and Galloway	631	75	2,070	246	71 78	NS878099	Sim,D
113	Deer Law	Donald Top	Black Law	28B: The River Tweed to the English Border	Scottish Borders	629	40	2,064	131	73	NT222255	Sim,DT
114	Alwhat	Donald Top	Alhang	27C: The Glenkens to Annandale	Dumfries and Galloway/East Ayrshire	628	63	2,060	207	77	NS646020	Sim,DT
115	Cold Moss	Donald Top	Green Lowther	27C: The Glenkens to Annandale	Dumfries and Galloway/South Lanarkshire	628	63	2,060	207	71 78	NS898094	Sim,DT
116	Trowgrain Middle	Donald Top	Andrewhinney Hill	28B: The River Tweed to the English Border	Dumfries and Galloway/Scottish Borders	628	21	2,060	69	79	NT206150	DT,sSim
117	Bowbeat Hill	Donald Hill		28A: Firth of Forth to the River Tweed	Midlothian/Scottish Borders	626	79	2,054	259	73	NT292469	Sim,D
118	Hudderstone	Donald Hill		28B: The River Tweed to the English Border	South Lanarkshire	626	111	2,054	364	72	NT022271	Hu,Sim,D
119	Beinn Odhar	Donald Top	Beinn nan Eun	26B: Central Scotland from Dumbarton to Montrose	Perth and Kinross/Stirling	626	41	2,054	135	57	NN714127	Sim,DT
120	Conscleuch Head	Donald Top	Black Law	28B: The River Tweed to the English Border	Scottish Borders	624	25	2,047	82	73	NT220262	DT,sSim
121	Coran of Portmark	Donald Hill		27B: Carrick and Galloway	Dumfries and Galloway	623	61	2,044	200	77	NX509936	Sim,D
122	Whitehope Law	Donald Hill		28A: Firth of Forth to the River Tweed	Scottish Borders	623	66	2,044	217	73	NT330445	Sim,D
123	Dundreich	Donald Hill		28A: Firth of Forth to the River Tweed	Scottish Borders	623	67	2,044	220	73	NT274490	Sim,D
124	Bell Craig	Donald Hill		28B: The River Tweed to the English Border	Dumfries and Galloway/Scottish Borders	623	47	2,044	154	79	NT186128	Sim,D
125	Ben Ever	Donald Top	Ben Cleuch	26A: Central Scotland from Dumbarton to Montrose	Clackmannanshire	622	38	2,041	125	58	NN893000	Sim,DT
126	White Shank	Donald Top	Capel Fell	28B: The River Tweed to the English Border	Dumfries and Galloway/Scottish Borders	622	27	2,039	88	79	NT169083	DT,sSim
127	Dungeon Hill	Donald Hill		27B: Carrick and Galloway	Dumfries and Galloway	620	115	2,034	377	77	NX460850	Hu,Sim,D
128	Tarfessock South Top	Donald Top	Tarfessock	27B: Carrick and Galloway	South Ayrshire	620	23	2,034	76	77	NX413886	DT,sSim
129	Cauldcleuch Head	Donald Hill		28B: The River Tweed to the English Border	Scottish Borders	619	256	2,031	840	79	NT456006	Ma,G,Sim,D
130	Lousie Wood Law	Donald Hill		27C: The Glenkens to Annandale	South Lanarkshire	619	123	2,031	404	71 78	NS932152	Hu,Sim,D
131	Windy Gyle	Donald Hill		33: Northumberland	Northumberland/Scottish Borders	619	113	2,031	371	80	NT855152	Hu,Sim,Hew,N,D
132	Meall Clachach	Donald Top	Uamh Bheag	26B: Central Scotland from Dumbarton to Montrose	Stirling	619	29	2,030	94	57	NN688125	DT,sSim
133	Mid Rig	Donald Top	Bell Craig	28B: The River Tweed to the English Border	Dumfries and Galloway/Scottish Borders	616	50	2,020	164	79	NT180122	Sim,DT
134	Herman Law	Donald Hill		28B: The River Tweed to the English Border	Dumfries and Galloway/Scottish Borders	614	31	2,016	101	79	NT213156	Sim,D
135	Bow	Donald Top	Meaul	27B: Carrick and Galloway	Dumfries and Galloway	613	38	2,011	125	77	NX508928	Sim,DT
136	Meikle Mulltaggart	Donald Top	Cairnsmore of Fleet	27B: Carrick and Galloway	Dumfries and Galloway	612	53	2,008	174	83	NX511678	Sim,DT
137	Glenleith Fell	Donald Top	Scaw'd Law	27C: The Glenkens to Annandale	Dumfries and Galloway	612	21	2,008	69	78	NS922023	DT,sSim
138	Earncraig Hill	Donald Hill		27C: The Glenkens to Annandale	Dumfries and Galloway/South Lanarkshire	611	109	2,005	358	78	NS973013	Hu,Sim,D
139	Keoch Rig	Donald Top	Windy Standard	27C: The Glenkens to Annandale	Dumfries and Galloway	611	19	2,005	62	77	NX616999	DT
140	Dugland	Donald Top	Windy Standard	27C: The Glenkens to Annandale	Dumfries and Galloway	611	46	2,006	151	77	NS602009	Tu, Sim, DT, GT, DN
141	Innerdownie	Donald Hill		26A: Central Scotland from Dumbarton to Montrose	Perth and Kinross	610	52	2,001	171	58	NN966031	Sim,D

== Bibliography ==
- Rab Anderson; Tom Prentice (1997). The Grahams & The Donalds - Scottish Mountaineering Club Hillwalkers' Guide. Scottish Mountaineering Club. ISBN 978-1907233197.
- Alan Dawson; Dave Hewitt (1995). The Grahams and the New Donalds. TACit Press. ISBN 9780953437603.

== DoBIH codes ==
The DoBIH uses the following codes for the various classifications of mountains and hills in the British Isles, which many of the above peaks also fall into:

- Ma Marilyn
- Hu HuMP
- Sim Simm
- 5 Dodd
- M Munro
- MT Munro Top
- F Furth
- C Corbett
- G Graham
- D Donald
- DT Donald Top
- Hew Hewitt
- N Nuttall
- Dew Dewey
- DDew Donald Dewey
- HF Highland Five
- 4 400-499m Tump
- 3 300-399m Tump (GB)
- 2 200-299m Tump (GB)
- 1 100-199m Tump (GB)
- 0 0-99m Tump (GB)
- W Wainwright
- WO Wainwright Outlying Fell
- B Birkett
- Sy Synge
- Fel Fellranger
- CoH County Top – Historic (pre-1974)
- CoA County Top – Administrative (1974 to mid-1990s)
- CoU County Top – Current County or Unitary Authority
- CoL County Top – Current London Borough
- SIB Significant Island of Britain
- Dil Dillon
- A Arderin
- VL Vandeleur-Lynam
- MDew Myrddyn Dewey
- O Other list (which includes):
  - Bin Binnion
  - Bg Bridge
  - BL Buxton & Lewis
  - Ca Carn
  - CT Corbett Top
  - GT Graham Top
  - Mur Murdo
  - P500 P500
  - P600 P600
- Un unclassified

prefixes:
- s sub
- x deleted

suffixes:
= twin

== See also ==
- Lists of mountains and hills in the British Isles
- List of mountains of the British Isles by height
- Lists of mountains and hills in the British Isles
- Lists of mountains in Ireland
- List of Munro mountains
- List of Murdo mountains
- List of Furth mountains in the British Isles
- List of Marilyns in the British Isles
- List of P600 mountains in the British Isles
