= Meaul =

Hill in the Southern Uplands of Scotland

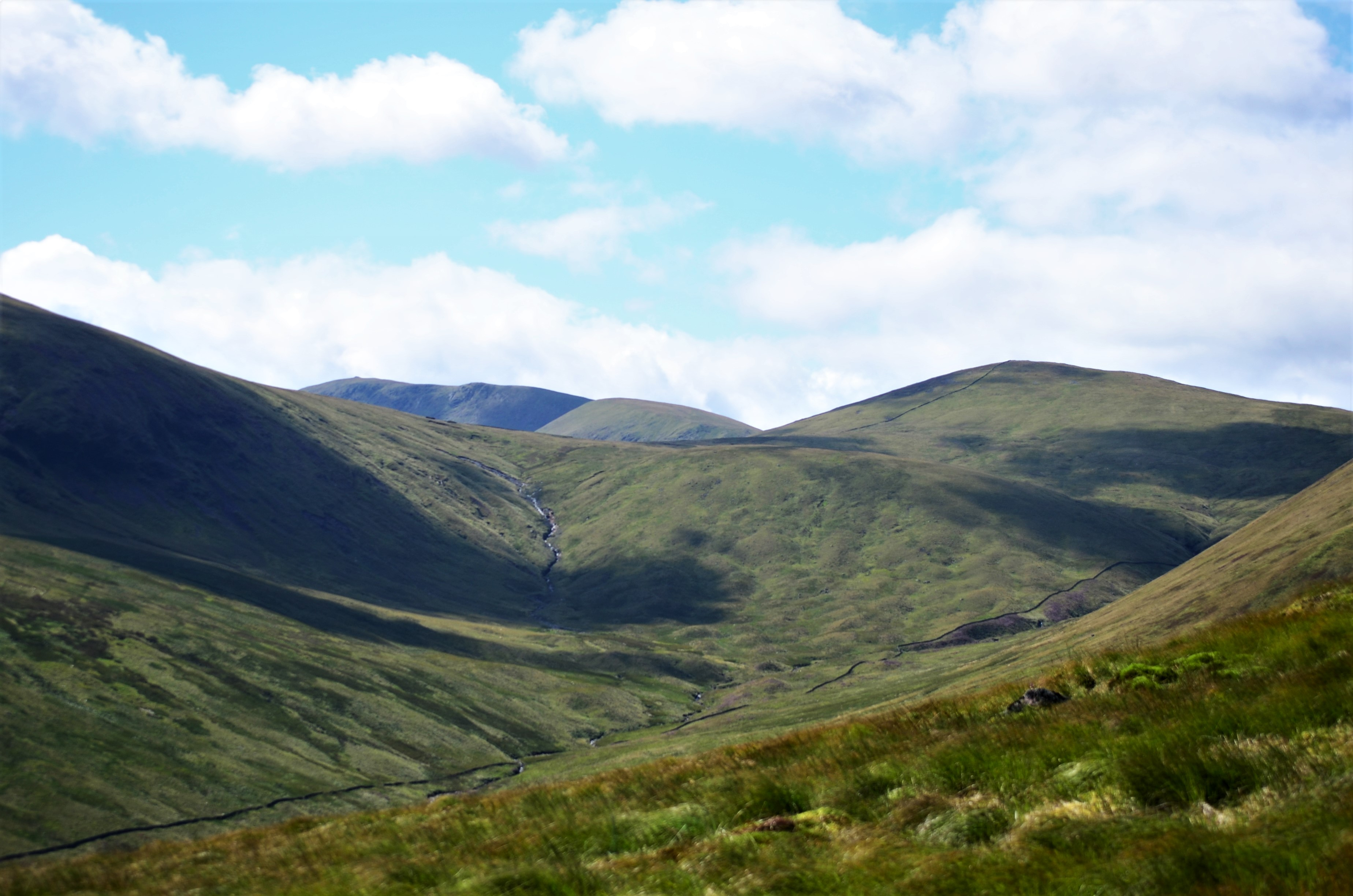

Highest point
- Elevation: 695 m (2,280 ft)
- Prominence: 74 m (243 ft)
- Listing: Tu,Sim,D,GT,DN

Naming
- English translation: Scottish Gaelic: Bare or Heap

Geography
- Location: Dumfries and Galloway, Scotland
- Parent range: Rhinns of Kells, Galloway Hills
- OS grid: NX 50063 90978
- Topo map: OS Landranger 77

Meaul is a hill in the Rhinns of Kells, a sub-range of the Galloway Hills range, part of the Southern Uplands of Scotland. It is climbed from a number of directions; most commonly from Garryhorn near Carsphairn, often as part of a complete traverse of the ridge.

== Subsidiary SMC Summits ==
Summit	Height (m)	Listing
Bow	613	Tu,Sim,DT,GT,DN
