= Blackcraig Hill =

Hill in Scotland

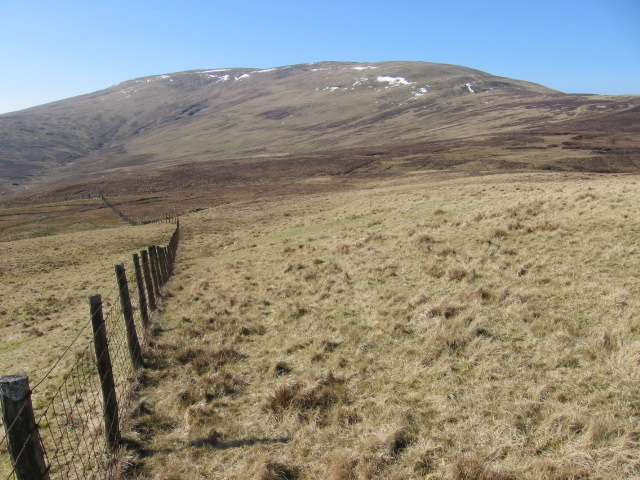

Highest point
- Elevation: 701 m (2,300 ft)
- Prominence: 236 m (774 ft)
- Listing: Ma,Hu,Tu,Sim,G,D,CoU,DN,Y
- Coordinates: 55°20′01″N 4°08′02″W

Geography
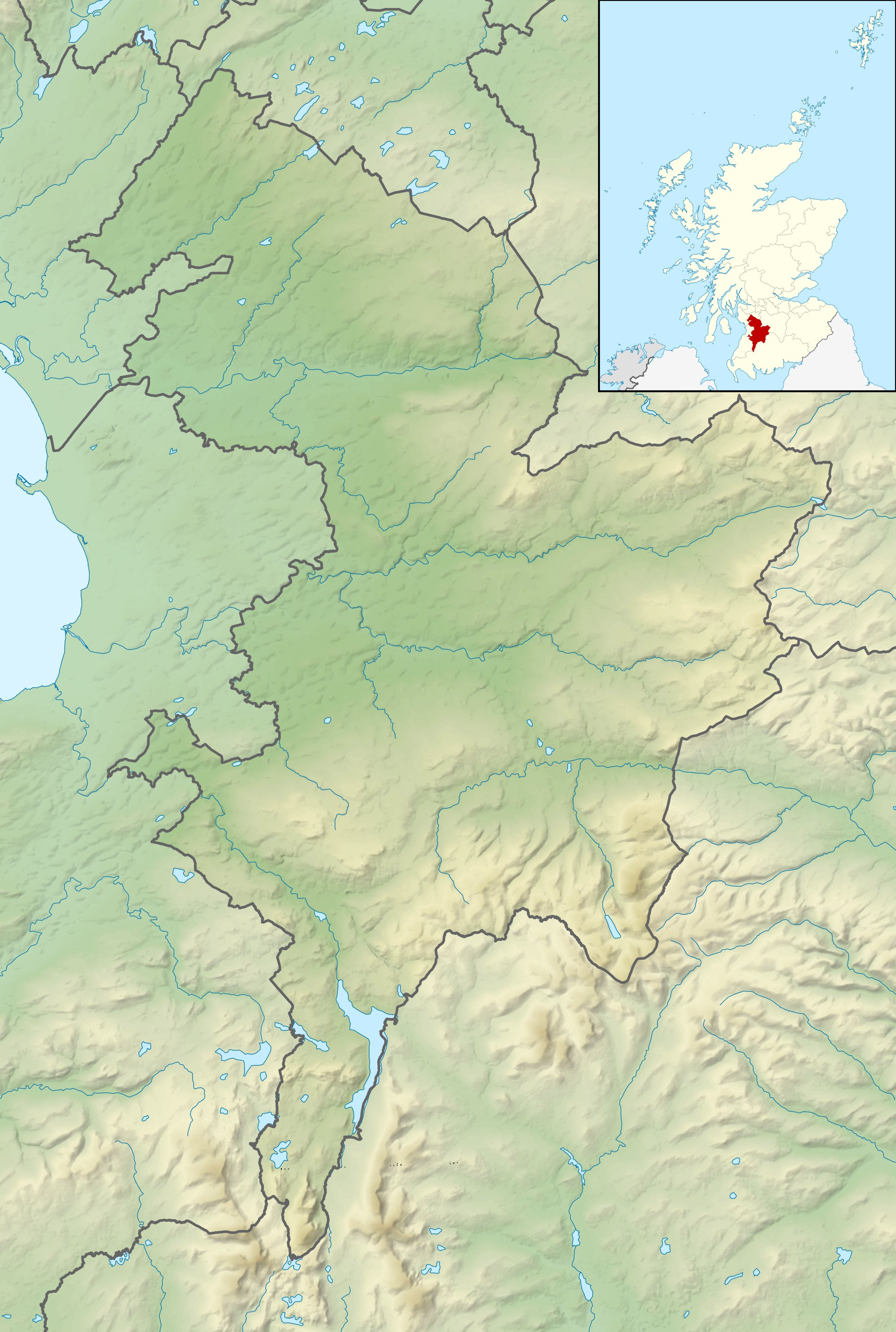
- Location within East Ayrshire Location within Scotland
- Location: East Ayrshire, Scotland
- Parent range: Carsphairn and Scaur Hills, Southern Uplands
- OS grid: NS 64767 06407
- Topo map: OS Landranger 71, 77

Blackcraig Hill is a hill in the Carsphairn and Scaur Hills range, part of the Southern Uplands of Scotland. It lies southeast of the town of New Cumnock in Ayrshire. A craggy hill, it is usually climbed from its western side starting at Glen Afton.
