= Beinn nan Eun (Perth and Kinross) =

Hill in Scotland

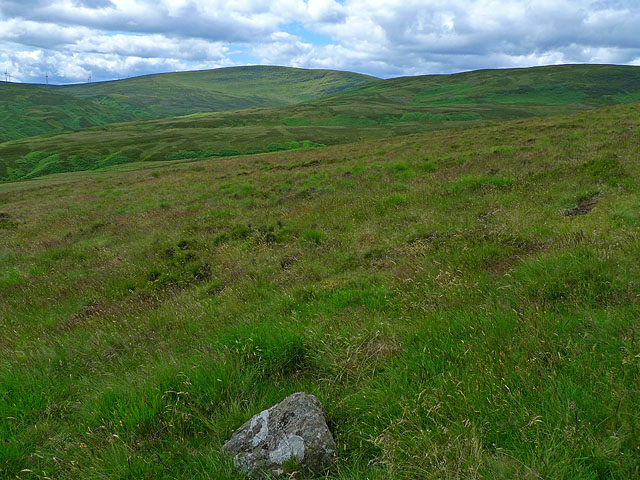

Highest point
- Elevation: 631 m (2,070 ft)
- Prominence: 142 m (466 ft)
- Listing: Hu,Tu,Sim,D,sMa,GT,DN,Y
- Coordinates: 56°17′40″N 4°03′55″W

Naming
- English translation: Scottish Gaelic: 'Hill of the Bird'

Geography
- Location: Perth and Kinross, Scotland
- Parent range: Glen Artney Hills, Southern Uplands
- OS grid: NN 7236 1311
- Topo map: OS Landranger 57

Beinn nan Eun is a hill in the Glen Artney Hills range immediately south of the Highland Boundary Fault, part of the Central Lowlands of Scotland. The second highest hill of the range, it does not share a boundary with Stirlingshire unlike its neighbour, Uamh Bheag. An impressive crag drops from its eastern side. Most ascents begin in Glen Artney itself to the north and take in the neighbouring hills, usually in an anti-clockwise direction, leaving it until last.

== Subsidiary SMC Summits ==
Summit	Height (m)	Listing
Beinn Odhar	626	Tu,Sim,DT,GT,DN
