= Moorbrock Hill =

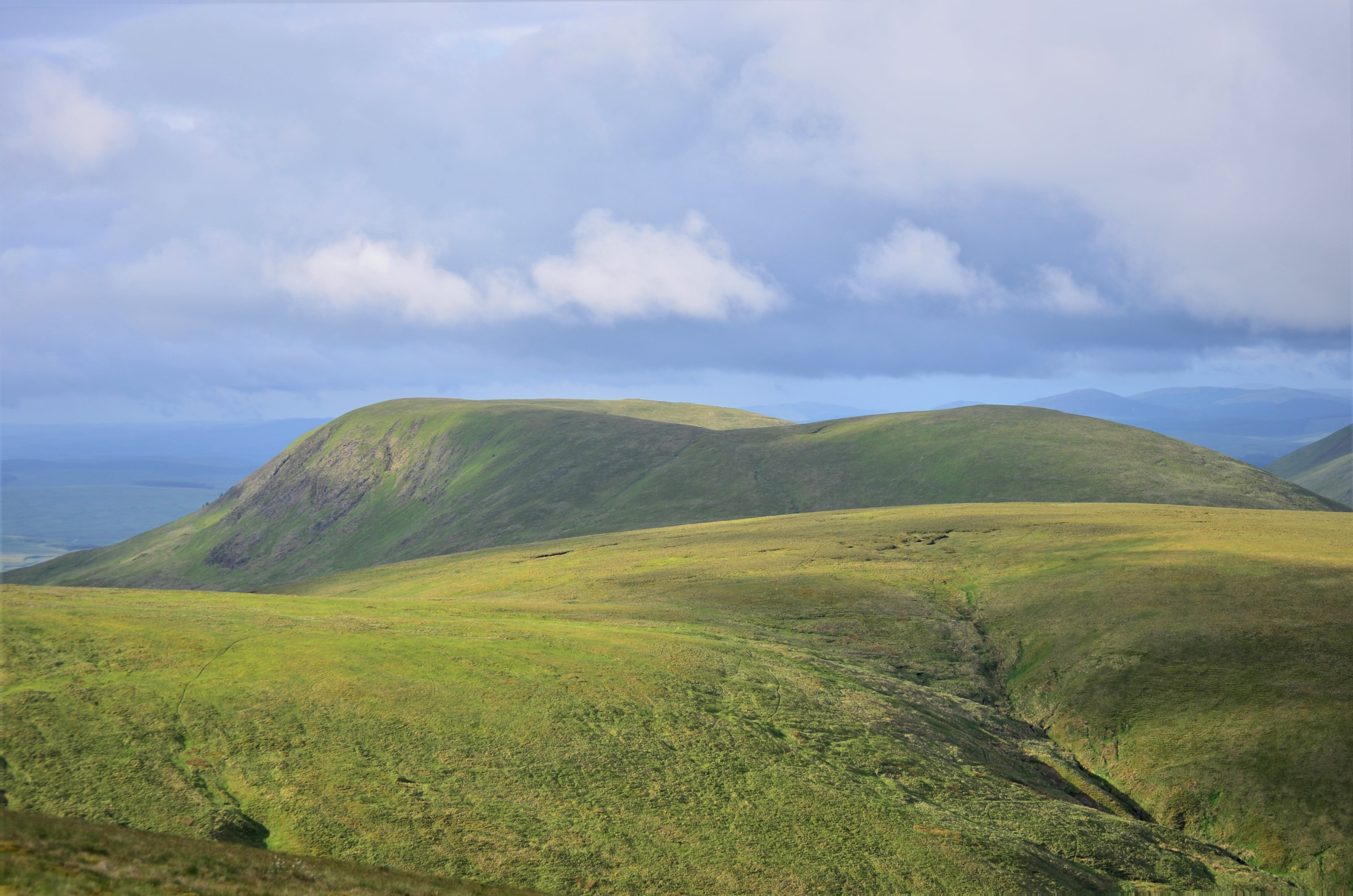

Highest point
- Elevation: 651.4 m (2,137 ft)
- Prominence: 113.4 m (372 ft)
- Listing: Hu, Tu, Sim, D, GT, DN, Y

Geography
- Location: Dumfries and Galloway, Scotland
- Parent range: Carsphairn and Scaur Hills, Southern Uplands
- OS grid: NX 62068 98388
- Topo map: OS Landranger 77

Moorbrock Hill is a hill in the Carsphairn and Scaur Hills range, part of the Southern Uplands of Scotland. Although frequently climbed on its own from Craigengillan to the south, it is also often part of a round of the neighbouring hills.
