= Cauldcleuch Head =

Hill in the Southern Uplands of Scotland

Coordinates: 55.297244°N 2.857426°W

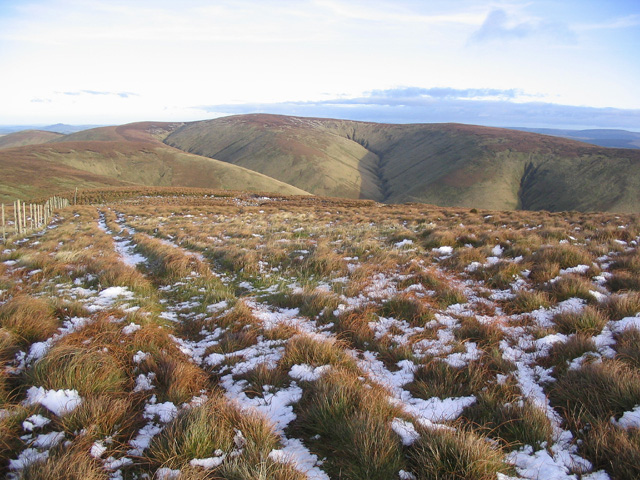

Highest point
- Elevation: 619 m (2,031 ft)
- Prominence: 256 m (840 ft)
- Listing: Ma,Hu,Tu,Sim,G,D,DN,Y

Naming
- English translation: Scots: Head of the Cold Ravine

Geography
- Location: Scottish Borders, Scotland
- Parent range: Roxburghshire, Southern Uplands
- OS grid: NT 45656 00680
- Topo map: OS Landranger 79

Cauldcleuch Head is a hill in an unnamed range of Roxburghshire hills north of Langholm, part of the Southern Uplands of Scotland. The highest hill in this range, it has an isolation of approximately 26 km. Parts of the Gorrenberry Jubilee Wood can be found in the Billhope glen to its southwest, where the easiest line of ascent is found.
