= Uamh Bheag =

Hill in the Central Lowlands of Scotland

Coordinates: 56.281023°N 4.11566°W

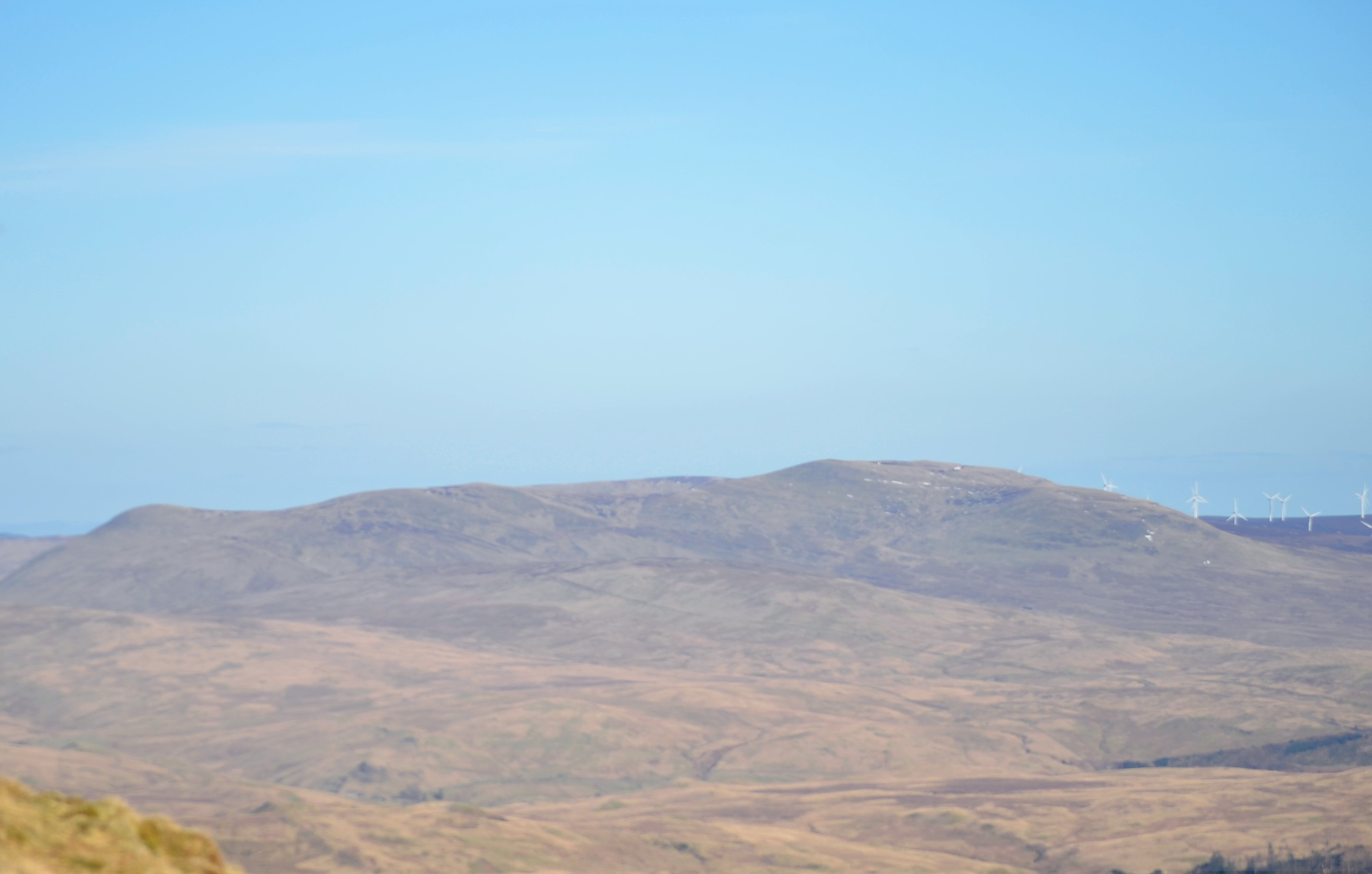

Highest point
- Elevation: 665.8 m (2,184 ft)
- Prominence: 325 m (1,066 ft)
- Listing: Ma,Hu,Tu,Sim,G,D,DN,Y

Naming
- English translation: Scottish Gaelic: 'Little Cave'

Geography
- Location: Stirlingshire, Perth and Kinross, Scotland
- Parent range: Glen Artney Hills, Southern Uplands
- OS grid: NN 69118 11846
- Topo map: OS Landranger 57

Uamh Bheag is a hill in the Glen Artney Hills range immediately south of the Highland Boundary Fault, part of the Central Lowlands of Scotland. The highest hill of the range, the summit is twin-topped; the lower east top has a trig point. Until 2017, it was not certain which hill was higher, and subsequently which was the Donald and Graham. That year, a survey was conducted which proved the west top to be approximately 2.4m higher. The true summit is currently marked with a cairn and a face carved out of a wooden fencepost, extending from it. It is normally ascended with neighbouring Beinn nan Eun from Glen Artney itself.

== Subsidiary SMC Summits ==
Summit	Height (m)	Listing
Meall Clachach	618.8	DT,sSim
