= Wedder Law =

Hill in the Southern Uplands of Scotland

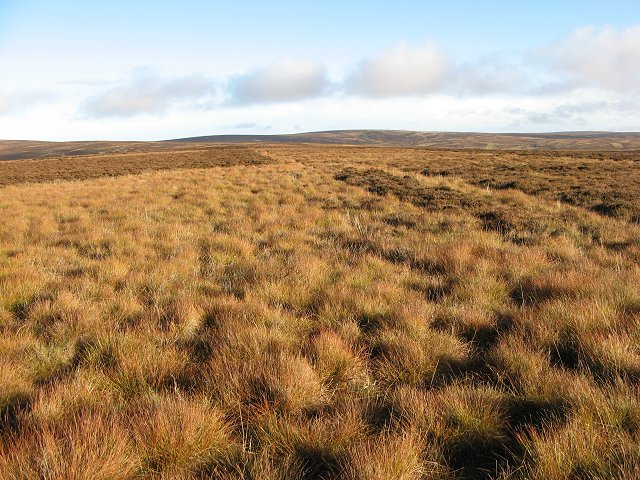

Highest point
- Elevation: 672 m (2,205 ft)
- Prominence: 137 m (449 ft)
- Listing: Hu,Tu,Sim,D,GT,DN,Y

Naming
- English translation: Scots: Wether Hill

Geography
- Location: Dumfries and Galloway, Scotland
- Parent range: Lowther Hills, Southern Uplands
- OS grid: NS 93871 02521
- Topo map: OS Landranger 78

Wedder Law is a hill in the Lowther Hills range, part of the Southern Uplands of Scotland. With a flat, featureless summit, it is normally ascended as part of a round of the neighbouring hills.
