= Capel Fell =

Hill in the Southern Uplands of Scotland

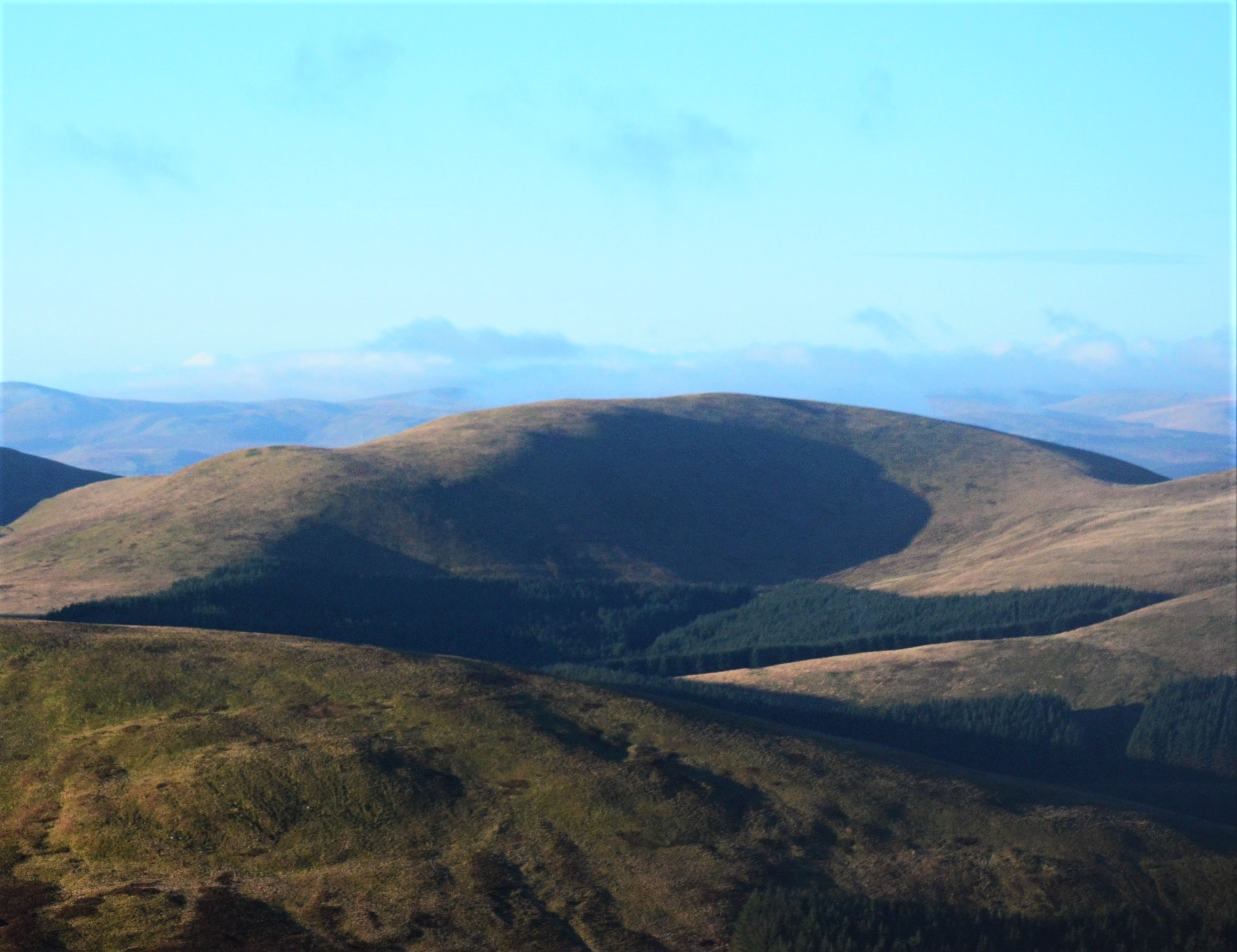

Highest point
- Elevation: 678 m (2,224 ft)
- Prominence: 159 m (522 ft)
- Listing: Ma,Hu,Tu,Sim,G,D,DN,Y

Geography
- Location: Dumfries and Galloway, Scottish Borders, Scotland
- Parent range: Ettrick Hills, Southern Uplands
- Topo map: OS Landranger 79

Capel Fell is a hill in the Ettrick Hills range, part of the Southern Uplands of Scotland. Close to the Southern Upland Way, routes of ascent frequently incorporate its track, however the track from Selcoth Fisheries to the west is also popular. It is frequently climbed with the neighbouring hills.

== Subsidiary SMC Summits ==
Summit	Height (m)	Listing
Smidhope Hill	644	Tu,Sim,DT,GT,DN
White Shank	621.6	DT,sSim
