= Innerdownie =

Hill in Perth and Kinross, Scotland

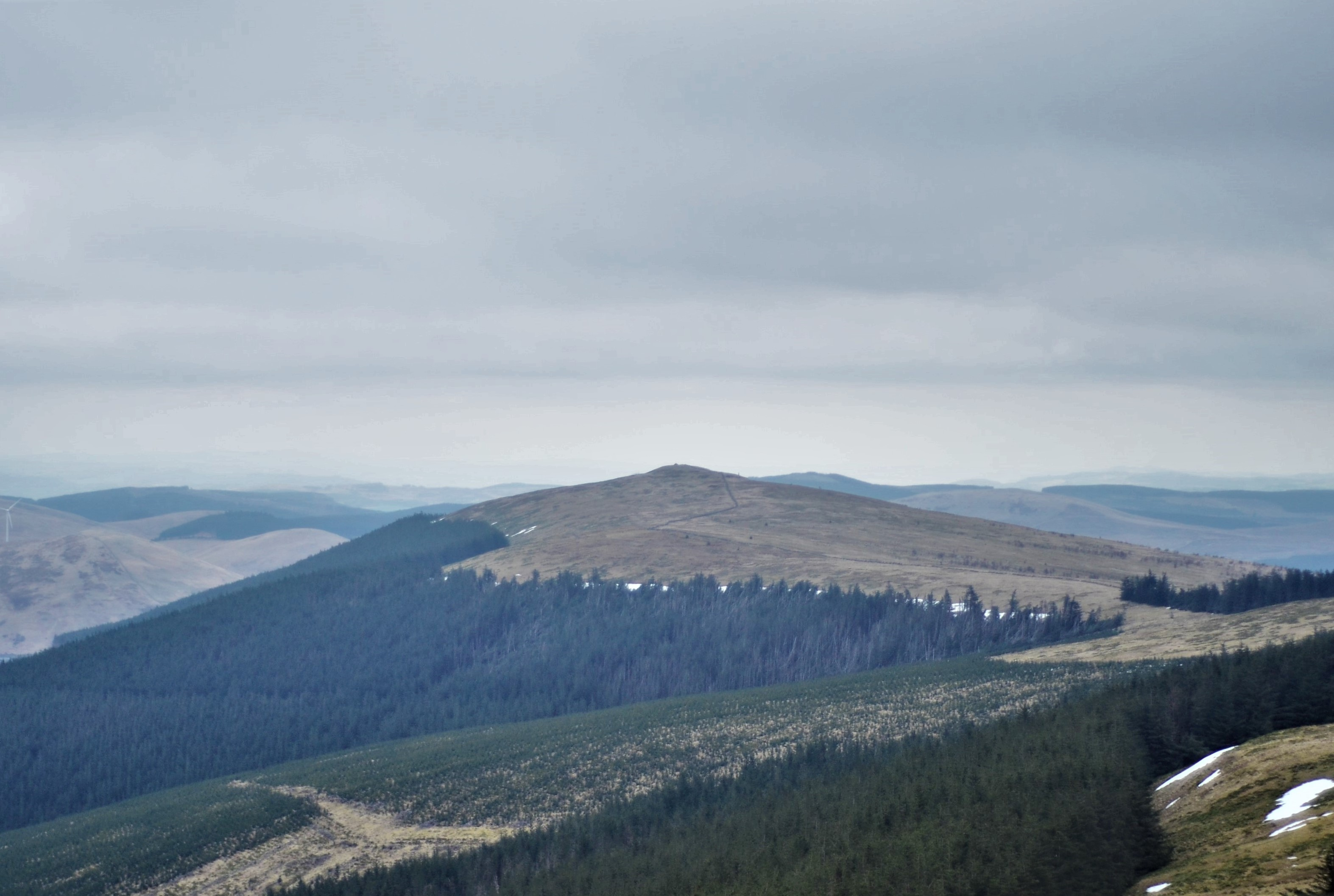

Highest point
- Elevation: 610 m (2,000 ft)
- Prominence: 52 m (171 ft)
- Listing: Tu,Sim,D,GT,DN

Geography
- Location: Perth and Kinross, Scotland
- Parent range: Ochil Hills
- OS grid: NN 96668 03138

Innerdownie is a hill in the Ochil Hills range, part of the Central Lowlands in Scotland. It is the most easterly Donald in the range and, at 610 m (2001 ft), the lowest Donald. Commonly, ascents begin from Glensherup and Glendevon to the north and northeast respectively, often ascended as part of a round of the neighbouring hills.
