= Erie Hill =

Hill in Scotland

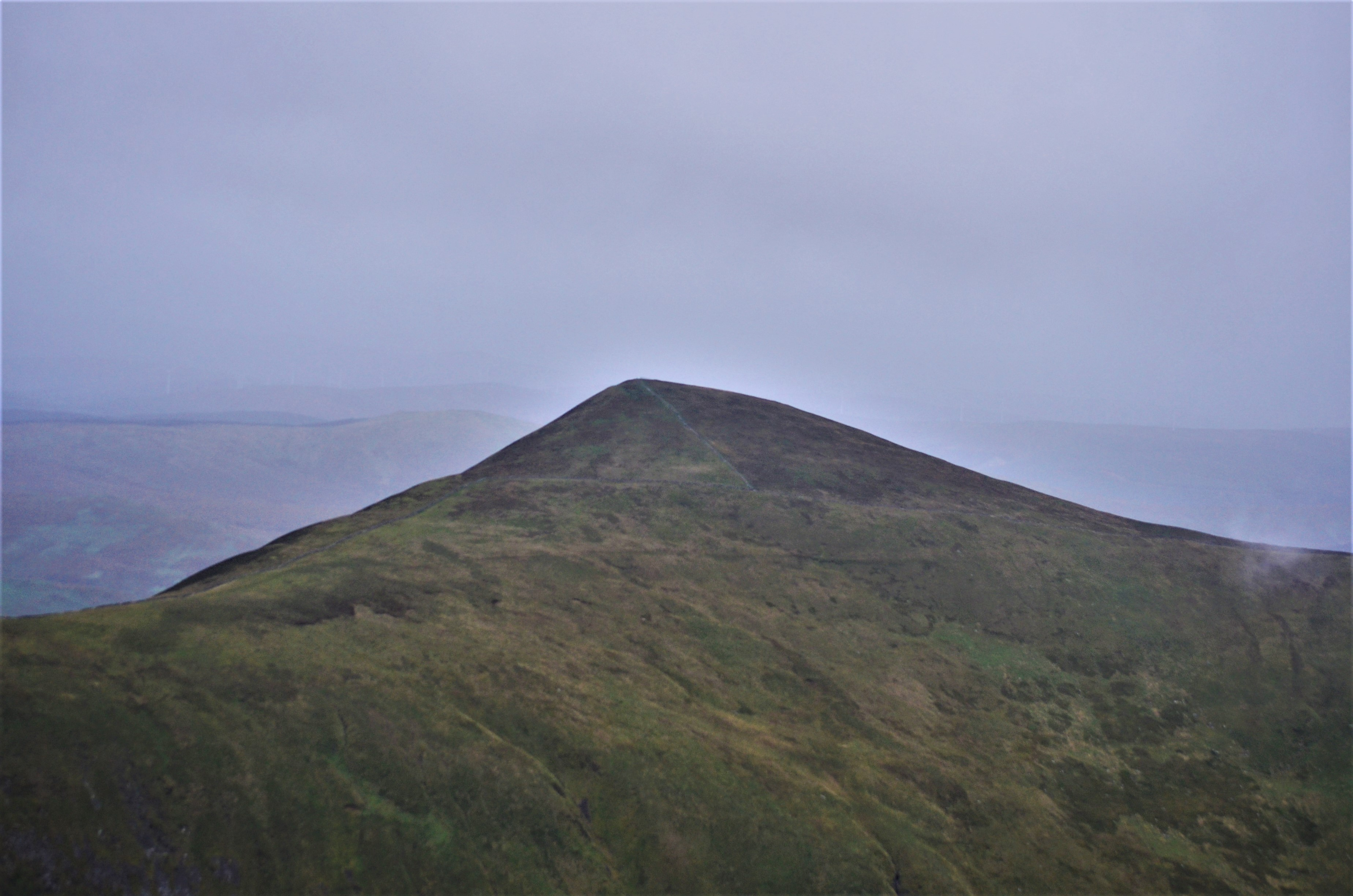

Highest point
- Elevation: 690 m (2,260 ft)
- Prominence: 92 m (302 ft)
- Listing: Tu,Sim, D,sHu,GT,DN

Geography
- Location: Scottish Borders, Scotland
- Parent range: Moffat Hills, Southern Uplands
- OS grid: NT 12411 18736
- Topo map: OS Landranger 78

Erie Hill is a hill in the Moffat Hills range, part of the Southern Uplands of Scotland. A relatively compact summit in comparison to the other hills in the range, it is commonly climbed as part of a round starting from Talla Linnfoots to the north.

== Subsidiary SMC Summits ==
Summit	Height (m)	Listing
Laird's Cleuch Rig	684	Tu,Sim,DT,GT,DN
Garelet Hill	681	DT,sSim
