= Daer Water =

River in Scotland

Coordinates: 55.39°N 3.64°W

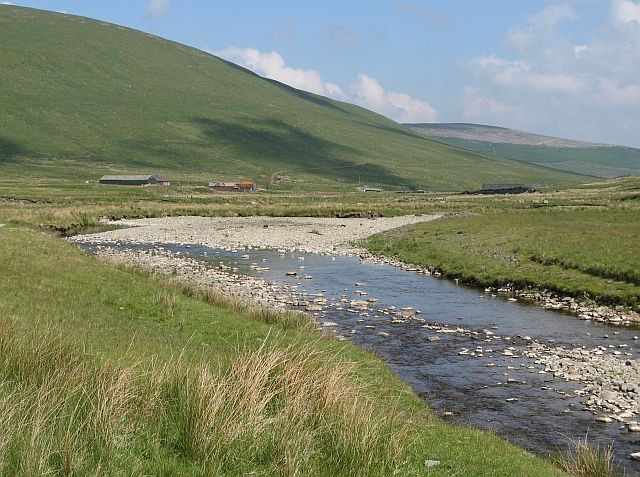

Daer Water (Scots: daer; [døːɾ] and [deːɾ], northern Scotland [diːɾ]) is one of the streams located in the watershed region which surrounds the River Clyde in Scotland. It begins in the Lowther Hills about 600 metres (2,000 ft) above sea level and joins with Potrail Water near the Lanarkshire town of Elvanfoot at which point they become the River Clyde. The Daer Water flows through the Daer Reservoir which supplies water to the nearby towns of Lanarkshire.

== Etymology ==
The origin of the river-name Daer may be identical to that of the River Dare in Glamorgan, Wales (see Aberdare), and derived from the Brittonic dār/derw, meaning "oaks, an oakwood" (Welsh dâr, derw). However, recorded forms of this river name leave this equation, proposed by Watson, in doubt.
