= Harry Daer =

English cricketer

Personal information
- Full name: Harry Bruce Daer
- Born: 10 December 1918; Hammersmith, London, England
- Died: 19 December 1980 (aged 62); Plymouth, Devon, England
- Batting: Right-handed
- Bowling: Right-arm medium
- Relatives: Arthur Daer (brother)

Domestic team information
- Years: Team
- 1938–1939: Essex

Career statistics
Competition	First-class
Matches	9
Runs scored	60
Batting average	6.66
100s/50s	–/–
Top score	17
Balls bowled	570
Wickets	11
Bowling average	35.18
5 wickets in innings	–
10 wickets in match	–
Best bowling	3/21
Catches/stumpings	4/–
- Source: Cricinfo, 24 January 2011

Harry Bruce Daer (10 December 1918 – 19 December 1980) was an English cricketer. Daer was a right-handed batsman who bowled right-arm medium pace. He was born in Hammersmith, London.

Daer made his first-class debut for Essex against Worcestershire in the 1938 County Championship. He played 7 further first-class fixtures in that season, playing one more first-class fixture in the following against Yorkshire at Bramall Lane, Sheffield. Daer very much adhered to the stereotype of a tailender, scoring just 60 runs in his 9 matches at a batting average of 6.66 and a high score of 17. More successful with the ball, Daer took 11 wickets at a bowling average of 35.18, with best figures of 3/21.

During World War II, Daer is mentioned in The London Gazette in January 1942 as a 2nd Lieutenant in the Royal Army Service Corps. He died in Plymouth, Devon on 19 December 1980. Daer had survived his brother, Arthur, by five months. He too played first-class cricket, having a more successful career at the highest domestic level.
