= Arthur Daer =

English cricketer (1905–1980)

Personal information
- Full name: Arthur George Daer
- Born: 22 November 1905; Bishopsgate, London, England
- Died: 16 July 1980 (aged 74); Torquay, Devon, England
- Batting: Right-handed
- Bowling: Right-arm fast-medium
- Role: Bowler
- Relatives: Harry Daer (brother)

Domestic team information
- Years: Team
- 1925–1935: Essex

Career statistics
| Competition | First-class |
|---|---|
| Matches | 100 |
| Runs scored | 1,469 |
| Batting average | 14.54 |
| 100s/50s | 0/3 |
| Top score | 59 |
| Balls bowled | 13,868 |
| Wickets | 195 |
| Bowling average | 31.70 |
| 5 wickets in innings | 3 |
| 10 wickets in match | 0 |
| Best bowling | 6/38 |
| Catches/stumpings | 48/– |
- Source: Cricinfo, 25 April 2024

Arthur George Daer (22 November 1905 – 16 July 1980) was an English cricketer. He played for Essex between 1925 and 1935 primarily as a fast-medium bowler.

Daer made two appearances during the 1925 season but on both occasions failed to bowl and only batted as a tailender. He was a more regular part of the side between 1929 and 1934 with his most productive season coming in 1930 when he claimed 51 wickets. He also showed promise as a batsman, averaging over 20 that year, but did not develop this part of his game. His best bowing figures were achieved against Gloucestershire at Cheltenham in 1933 when he took 6/38 in an innings and 9/93 in the match.

In 1932, he was part of the Essex bowling attack that could not break the partnership of Yorkshire openers Percy Holmes and Herbert Sutcliffe as they recorded a world record stand of 555 at Leyton. Holmes was dropped on 3 off the bowling of Daer and the uncertainty over whether the partnership was worth 554 (which would only have equalled the record) or 555 centered on a no-ball from Daer which umpire Tiger Smith claimed to signal but was not initially recorded by the scorers.

Daer played cricket as an amateur earning his income through joint ownership of the Golden Lion public house in Romford. After retiring he also ran a sports shop alongside Essex team-mate Sonny Avery. His younger brother, Harry, played as a professional for Essex in 1938 and 1939.
