= Cramalt Craig =

Hill in Scottish Borders, Scotland

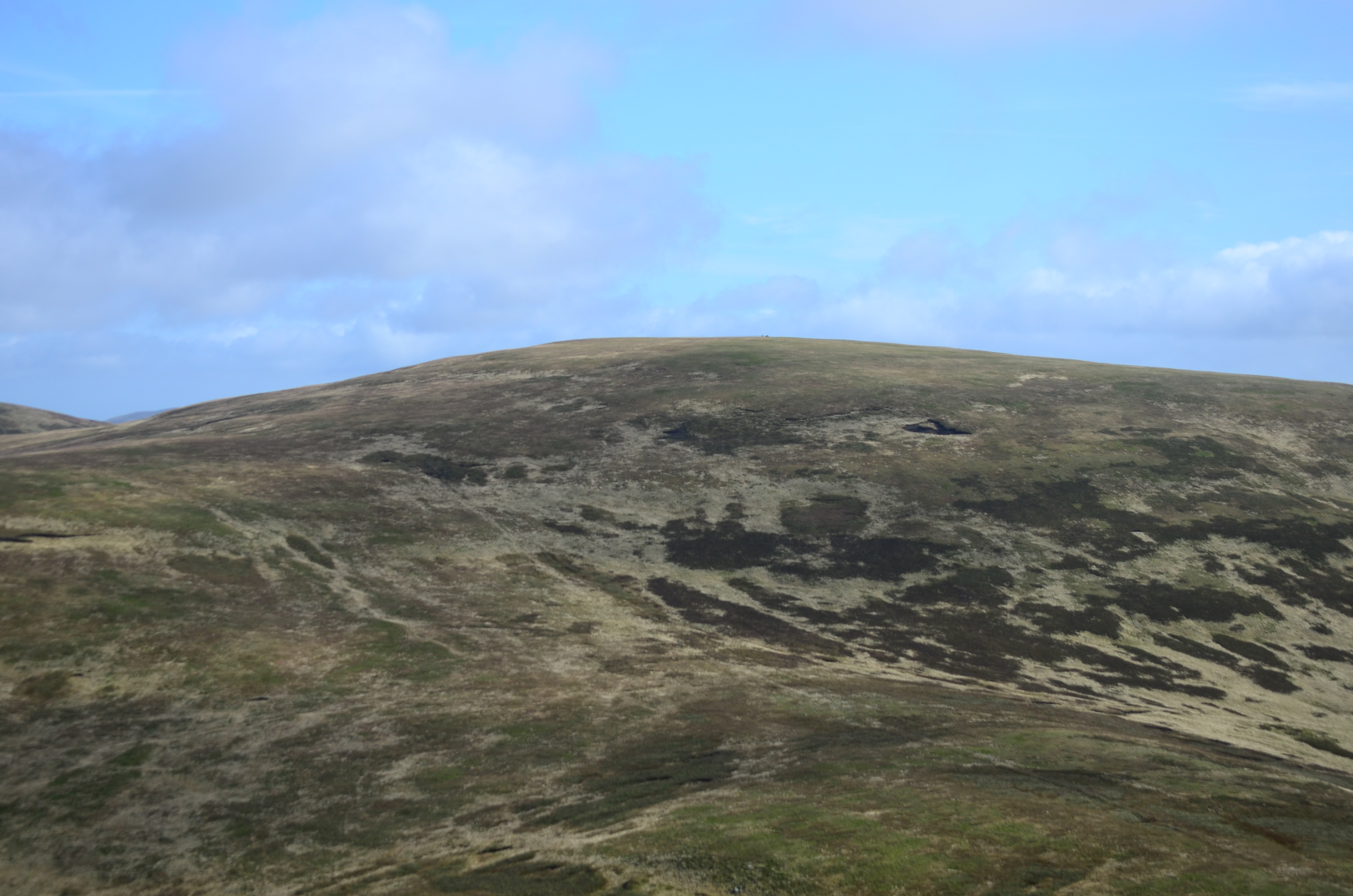
- Cramalt Craig

Highest point
- Elevation: 830.2 m (2,724 ft)
- Prominence: 147.4 m (484 ft)
- Listing: Hu,Tu,Sim,D,sMa,CT,DN,Y,xC

Geography
- Location: Scottish Borders, Scotland
- Parent range: Manor Hills, Southern Uplands
- OS grid: NT 16846 24736
- Topo map: OS Landranger 72

Cramalt Craig is a hill in the Manor Hills range, part of the Southern Uplands of Scotland. The second highest in the range and third highest in southern Scotland, it was previously also a Corbett until new Ordnance Survey contouring became available and it was deleted from the 1984 edition of the tables. A 2013 survey by Alan Dawson confirmed the col between it and Broad Law to be a few metres short of 500 feet (152.4 metres). It is climbed almost solely from its southern sides at the Megget Stane or Cramalt Farm, taking in the neighbouring hills.

== Subsidiary SMC Summits ==
Summit	Height (m)	Listing
Clockmore	641	Tu,Sim,DT,GT,DN
Hunt Law	639	Tu,Sim,DT,GT,DN
