= Broad Law =

Hill of the Southern Uplands of Scotland

Coordinates: 55.49779°N 3.35338°W

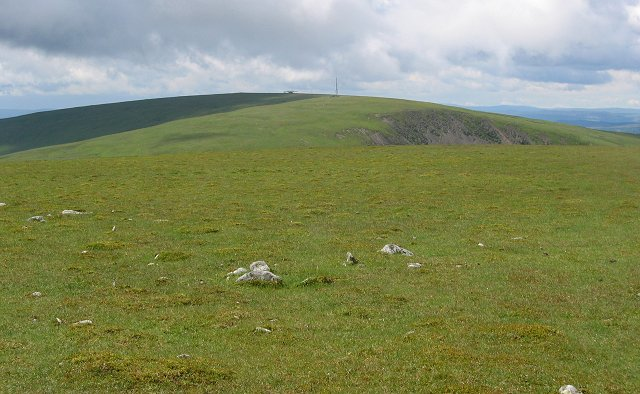
- Broad Law seen from the nearby hill of Cramalt Craig. The radio tower and navigation beacon on the top are visible.

Highest point
- Elevation: 840 m (2,760 ft)
- Prominence: 653 m
- Parent peak: Merrick
- Listing: Ma,Hu,Tu,Sim, C, D,CoH,CoU,CoA, DN,Y,P600,P500

Geography
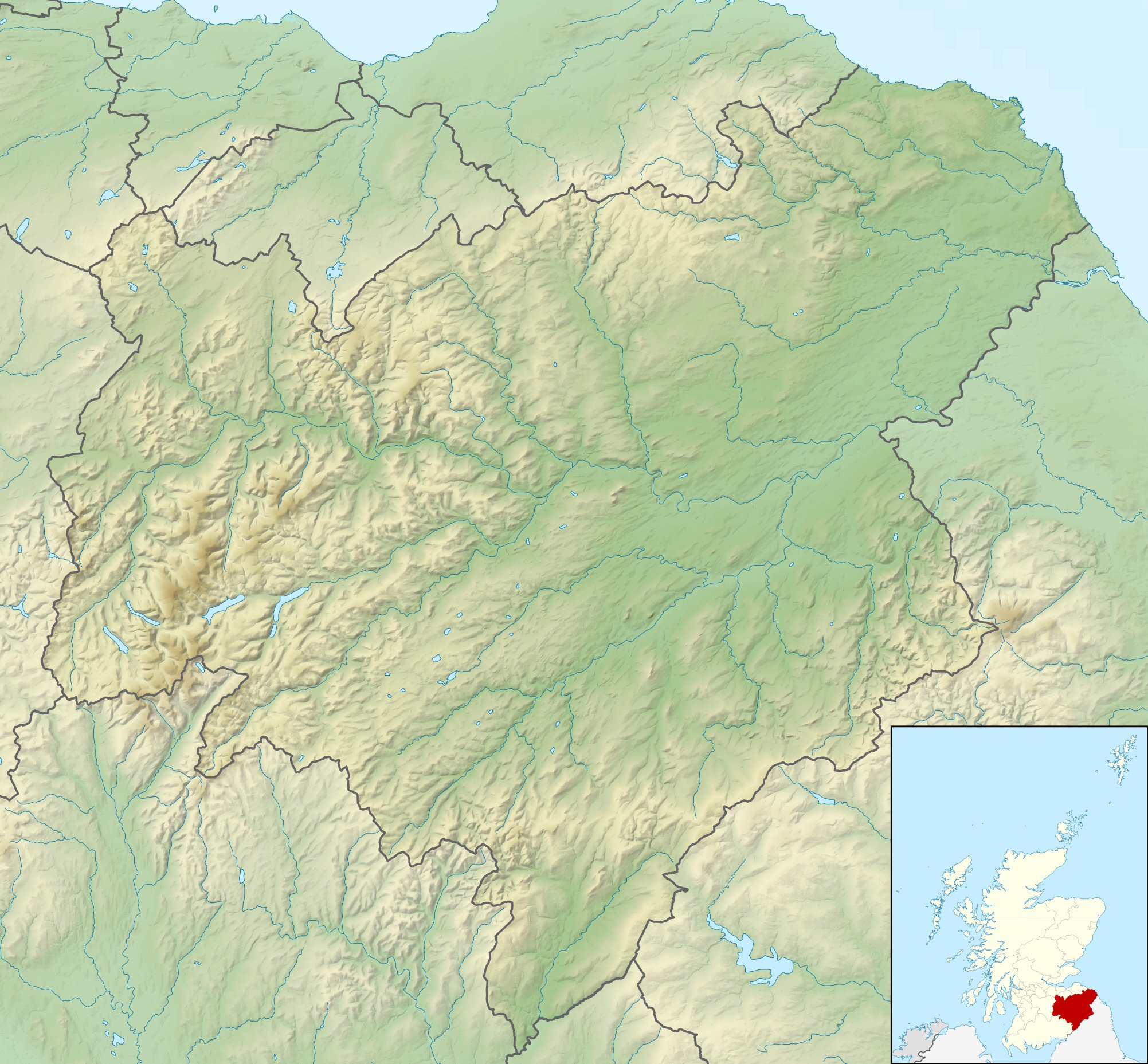
- Location within Scottish Borders Location within Scotland
- Location: Scottish Borders, Scotland
- Parent range: Manor Hills, Southern Uplands
- OS grid: NT 14643 23533
- Topo map: OS Landranger 72

Broad Law is a hill in the Manor Hills range, part of the Southern Uplands of Scotland. The second-highest point in the Southern Uplands and the highest point in the Scottish Borders, it has an elevation of 840 metres, a prominence of 653 metres (and thus is a "major") and an isolation of 81 kilometres. It is only 3 m (10 ft) lower than its parent, Merrick. Like many of its neighbours it is smooth, rounded and grassy, although the surrounding glens have very steep sides — country somewhat akin to the Cheviots or the Howgill Fells. The hill is most easily climbed from the Megget Stane to the south, beginning at an elevation of 452 m (1,483 ft), but is also frequently climbed from the villages near its base, or as part of a long, 50 km (30 mi) trek across the local area between the towns of Peebles and Moffat. On the summit is the highest VOR beacon in the UK, and also a radio tower.

The summit of Broad Law is also the highest point (county top) of the historic county of Peeblesshire. It is also sometimes (erroneously) given as the county top of Selkirkshire. This is because in 1891, the area of Megget (a detached part of Lyne parish in Peeblesshire) was transferred to Yarrow parish in Selkirkshire. The administrative "county" boundary of Peeblesshire and Selkirkshire thus temporarily crossed Broad Law summit between 1891 and 1974. However, the historic county boundary remained several kilometres to the east, where Dun Rig is the county top of Selkirkshire.
