= Blacklorg Hill =

Hill in Scotland

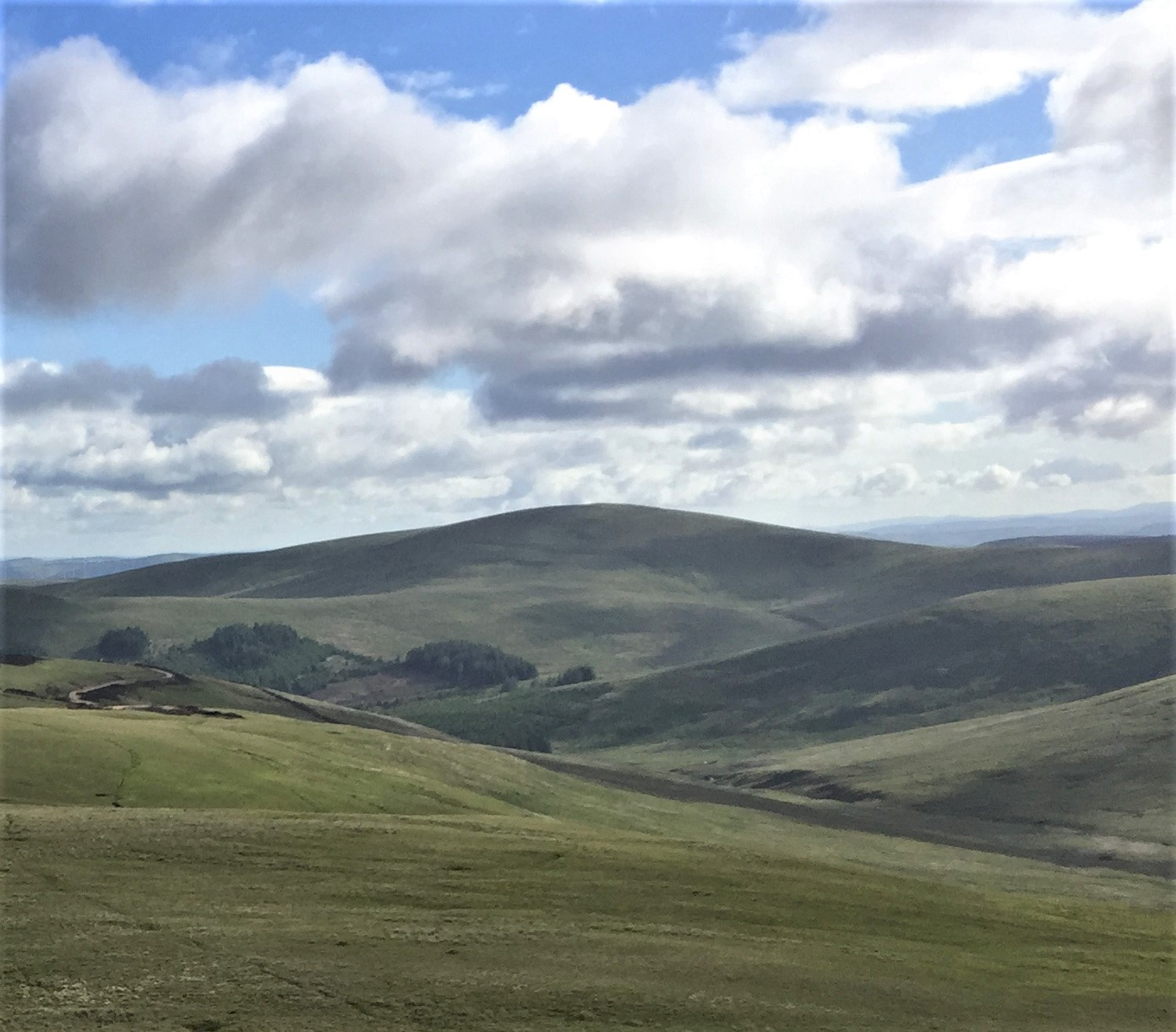

Highest point
- Elevation: 681 m (2,234 ft)
- Prominence: 148 m (486 ft)
- Listing: Hu,Tu,Sim,D,sMa,GT,DN,Y

Geography
- Location: East Ayrshire, Dumfries and Galloway, Scotland
- Parent range: Carsphairn and Scaur Hills, Southern Uplands
- OS grid: NS 65392 04237
- Topo map: OS Landranger 77

Blacklorg Hill is a hill in the Carsphairn and Scaur Hills range, part of the Southern Uplands of Scotland. It lies southeast of the town of New Cumnock in Ayrshire, directly east of the Afton Reservoir. It is most frequently climbed along with the neighbouring hills, starting from the Glen Afton road.

== Subsidiary SMC Summits ==
Summit	Height (m)	Listing
Meikledodd Hill	643	Tu,Sim,DT,GT,DN
