= Kirriereoch Hill =

Hill in the Southern Uplands of Scotland

Coordinates: 55.15204°N 4.48108°W

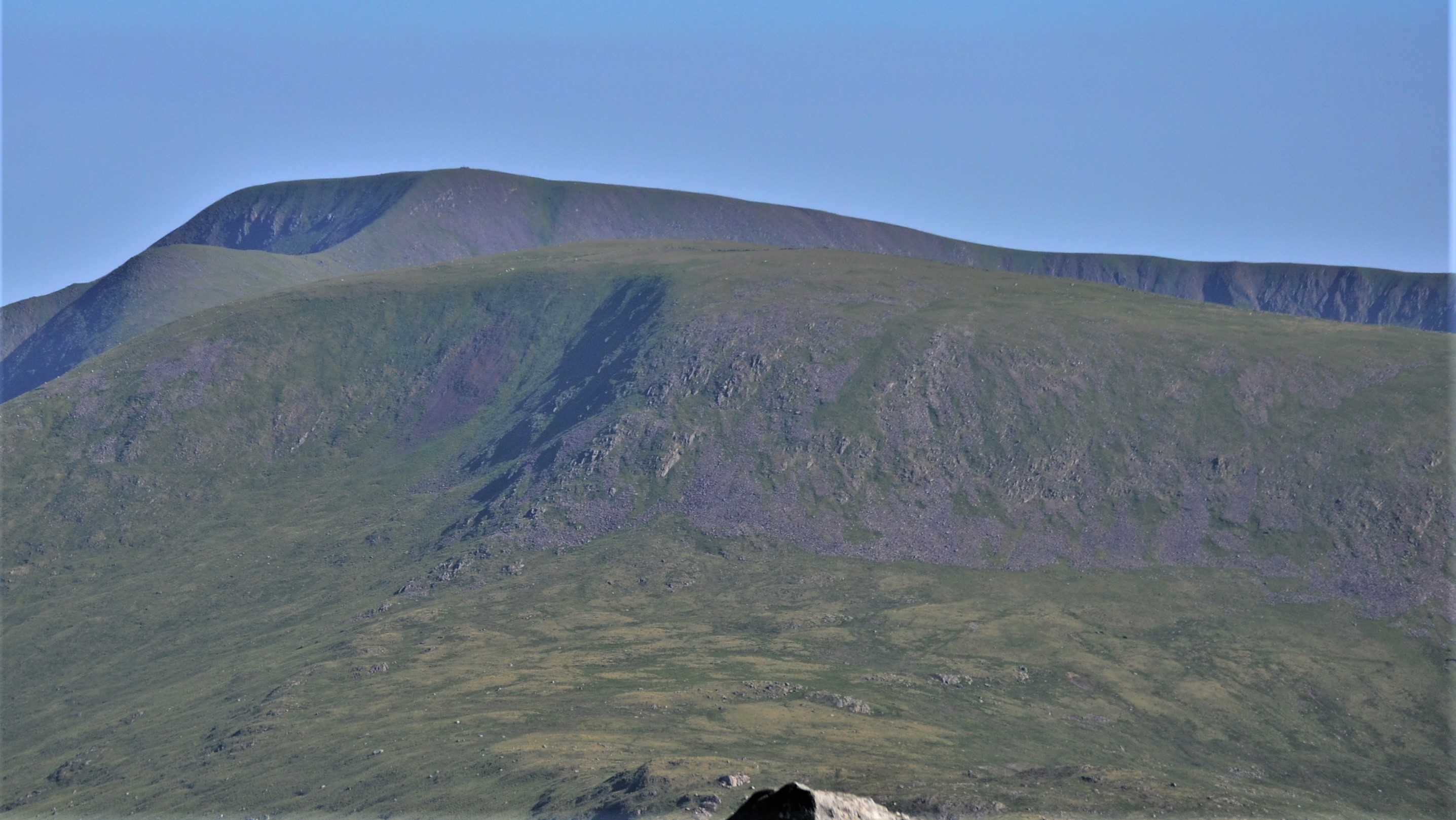

Highest point
- Elevation: 786 m (2,579 ft)
- Prominence: 150.2 m
- Listing: Ma,Hu,Tu,Sim, D, CT,DN,Y,xC

Naming
- Native name: Scottish Gaelic: Meall an t-Suachdain
- English translation: Kirriereoch Hill Scots: "Hill grazing ground of Kirriereoch farm", in turn from Scottish Gaelic: An Ceathramh Riabhach, "the brindled quarterland" Meall an t-Suachdain Scottish Gaelic "lump of the cooking-pot"

Geography
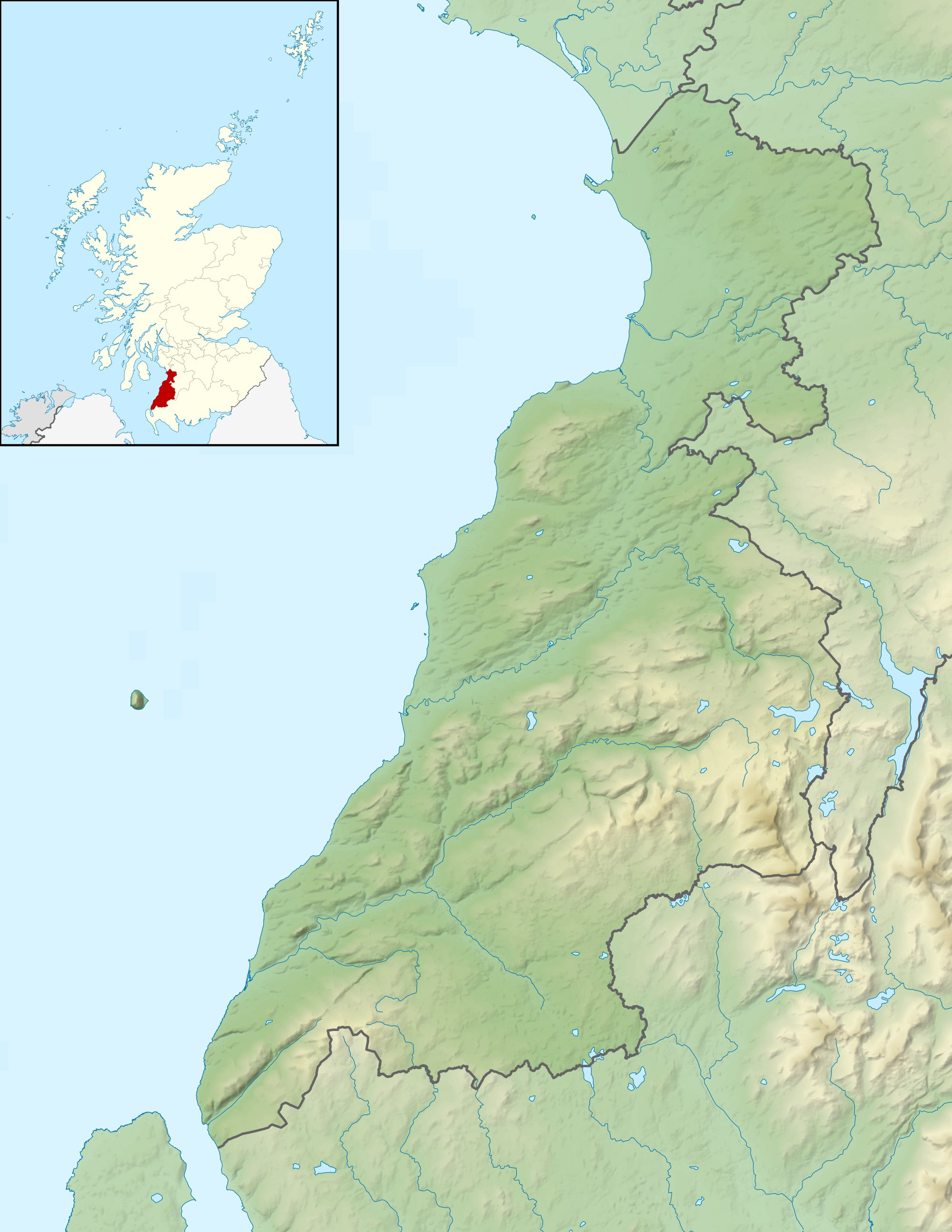
- Location within South Ayrshire Location within Scotland
- Location: South Ayrshire, Dumfries and Galloway, Scotland
- Parent range: Range of the Awful Hand, Galloway Hills, Southern Uplands
- OS grid: NX 42093 86949
- Topo map: OS Landranger 77

Kirriereoch Hill is a hill in the Range of the Awful Hand, a sub-range of the Galloway Hills range, part of the Southern Uplands of Scotland. It lies on the border of the old counties of Ayrshire and Kirkcudbrightshire, or the modern regions of Dumfries and Galloway and South Ayrshire. A boundary wall near the summit is the highest point in South Ayrshire and Ayrshire as a whole. Kirriereoch Hill was classified as a Corbett and Marilyn but then deleted from these lists in 1984 due to not being thought to achieve the respective prominence criteria. In August 2015 the hill was relisted as a Marilyn after having been surveyed to have a 150.2 m prominence. However, since this is less than the 152.4 m required, the hill will not be re-listed as a Corbett.

Its current name derives from Kirriereoch farm to its west, as hill in Scots can mean a hillside grazing ground but it was originally recorded in 1654 as "Meal Tuaichtan", a corruption of the original Gaelic name Meall an t-Suachdain. This name was kept for the loch beside the summit, Loch Twachtan (Loch an t-Suachdain).
