= Black Law (hill) =

Hill in the Southern Uplands of Scotland

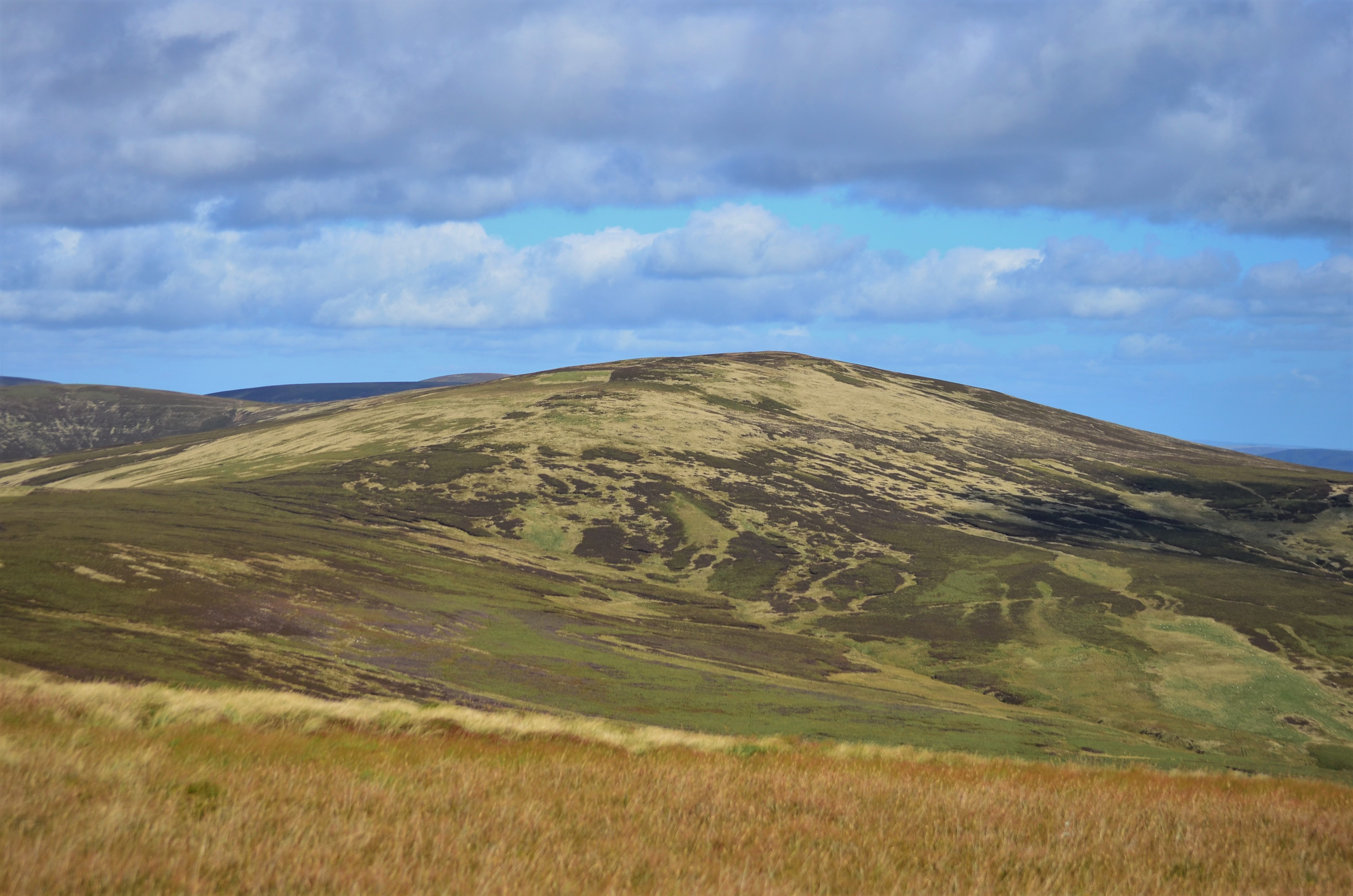

Highest point
- Elevation: 698 m (2,290 ft)
- Prominence: 103 m (338 ft)
- Listing: Hu,Tu,Sim,D,GT,DN,Y
- Coordinates: 55.534422°N 3.239942°W

Geography
- Location: Scottish Borders, Scotland
- Parent range: Manor Hills, Southern Uplands
- OS grid: NT 21833 27442
- Topo map: OS Landranger 73

Black Law is a hill in the Manor Hills range, part of the Southern Uplands of Scotland. One of the more remote Donalds, it does not easily combine into a round with other hills in the area and requires traversing rough terrain to reach the top. Common ascents are as part of an extended Dun Rig Horseshoe to the north-east, from the south at the Megget Reservoir or, most easily, from the Manor Valley itself.

== Subsidiary SMC Summits ==
Summit	Height (m)	Listing
Black Cleuch Hill [Blackhouse Heights]	675	DT,sSim
Deer Law	629	Tu,Sim,DT,GT,DN
Conscleuch Head	624	DT,sSim
