= Cairnsmore of Carsphairn =

Mountain in Dumfries and Galloway, Scotland

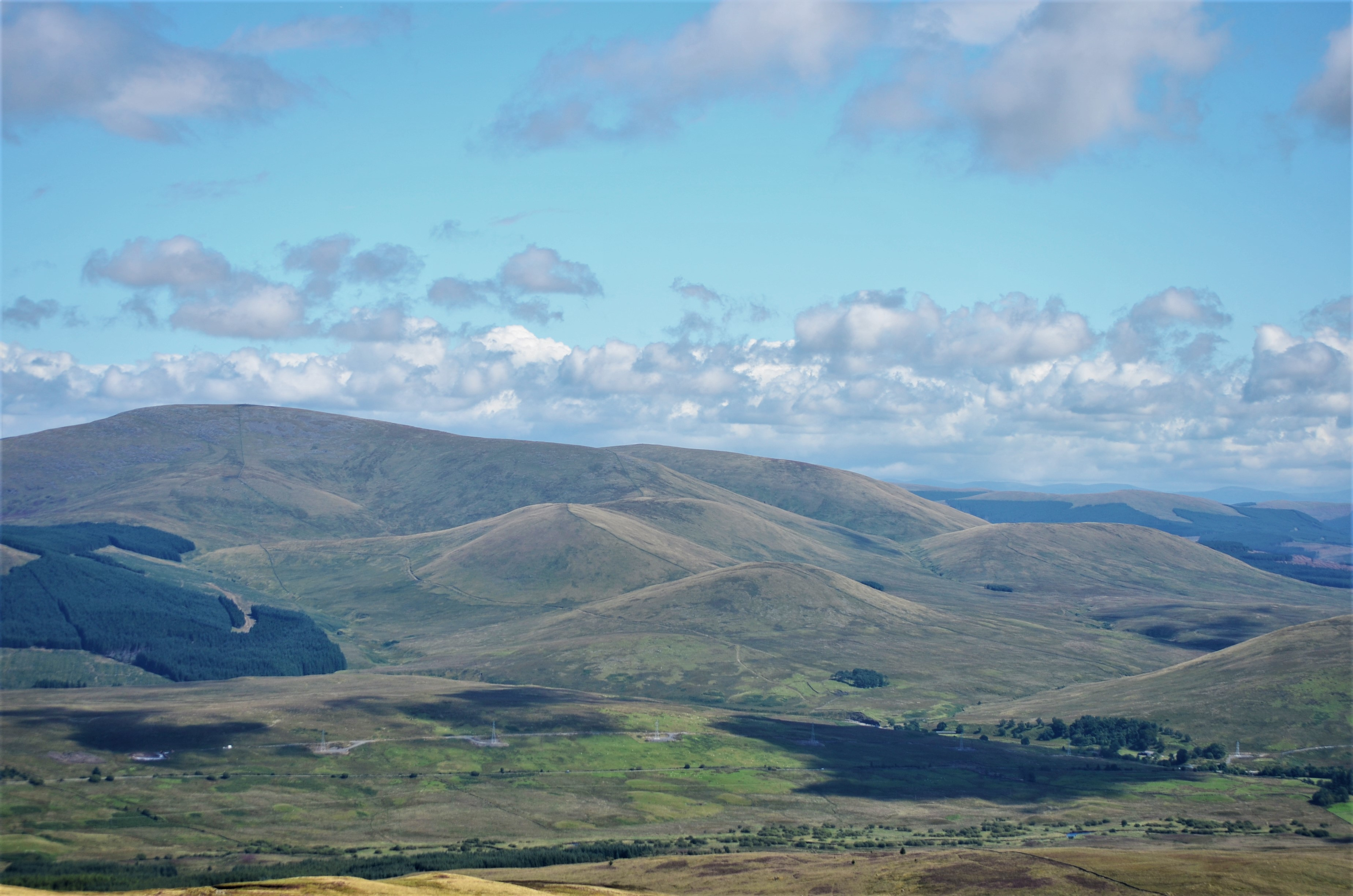

Highest point
- Elevation: 797 m (2,615 ft)
- Prominence: 582 m (1,909 ft)
- Listing: Ma,Hu,Tu,Sim, C, D,DN,Y,P500
- Coordinates: 55°15′22″N 4°12′44″W

Naming
- Native name: Scottish Gaelic: Càrnas Mòr Cars Feàrna
- English translation: Scottish Gaelic: Big rocky hill or hill of cairns by Carsphairn (Carse of alders)

Geography
- Location: Dumfries and Galloway, Scotland
- Parent range: Carsphairn and Scaur Hills, Southern Uplands
- OS grid: NX 59441 97999
- Topo map: OS Landranger 77

Cairnsmore of Carsphairn (Scottish Gaelic: Càrnas Mòr Cars Feàrna) is a hill in the Carsphairn and Scaur Hills range, part of the Southern Uplands of Scotland. An alternative name, rarely used nowadays, is Cairnsmore of Deugh (Càrnas Mòr Dubhach). Both of these qualifiers are used to distinguish this hill from the two other Cairnsmores in Galloway: Cairnsmore of Fleet and Cairnsmore of Dee. It is the highest hill in the range, and its summit is just under six kilometres (3 1/2 mi) northeast of Carsphairn village as the crow flies, in the far north of Kirkcudbrightshire.

== Walking ==
The usual route of ascent is from the A713 road to the west at the "Green Well of Scotland" one mile (1.5 kilometres) north of Carsphairn. Despite its height, it is a relatively easy hill to climb – over some rough grass, with no steep slopes and with a very flat summit area – though there are areas of more rugged ground on the outlying peaks of Beninner and Moorbrock. For most of the route, there are excellent views westward over the Glenkens to the Rhinns of Kells in the Galloway Hills. According to a tourist information board placed at The Green Well at the start of the track, in good conditions, the mountains of England, Wales, Ireland and the Highlands of Scotland can be seen from the summit, as well as Glasgow and Edinburgh, some 80 miles (130 kilometres) distant.

== Climbing ==
Because of the local geology, no good rock climbing has been recorded on the massif. However, in winter there are a number of short ice climbs of up to 150 metres (490 ft) on the slopes of Beninner and Moorbrock Hill.

== Subsidiary SMC Summits ==
Summit	Height (m)	Listing
Beninner	710	Tu,Sim,DT,GT,DN
