= Cape Law =

Hill in the Southern Uplands of Scotland

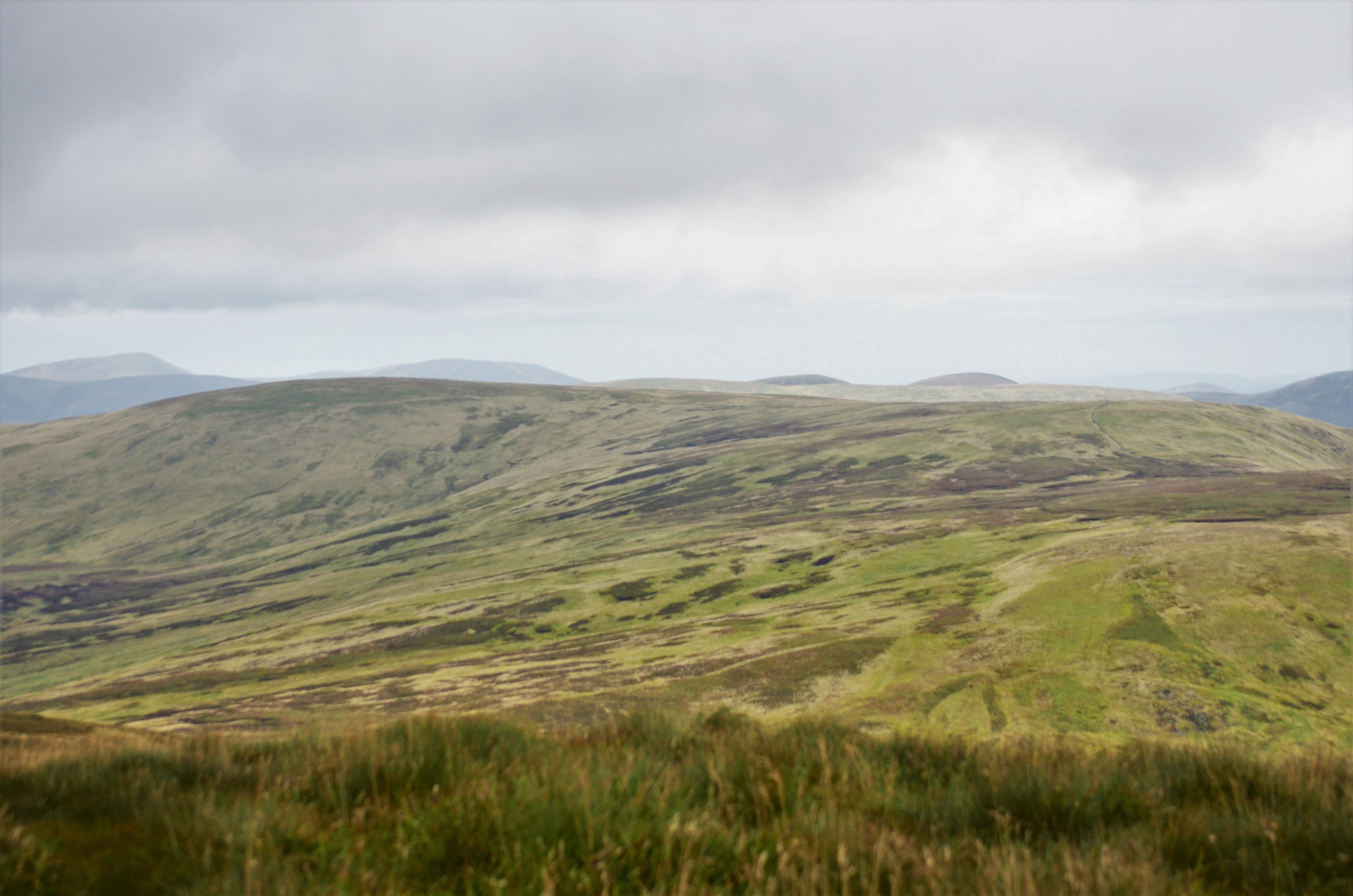

Highest point
- Elevation: 722 m (2,369 ft)
- Prominence: 93 m (305 ft)
- Listing: Tu,Sim, D,sHu,GT,DN

Geography
- Location: Scottish Borders, Scotland
- Parent range: Moffat Hills, Southern Uplands
- OS grid: NT 13120 15075
- Topo map: OS Landranger 78

Cape Law is a hill in the Moffat Hills range, part of the Southern Uplands of Scotland. A sprawling summit, it is commonly ascended from Talla Linfoots to the north on the way to the higher summits to the west and east.

== Subsidiary SMC Summits ==
Summit	Height (m)	Listing
Din Law	667	Tu,Sim,DT,GT,DN
