= Daer Reservoir =

- Location within Scotland
- Location: South Lanarkshire, Scotland
- Coordinates: 55.353°N 3.617°W
- Type: reservoir

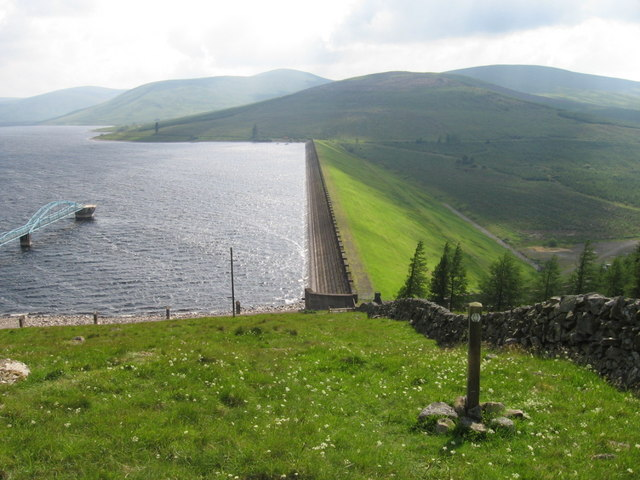
Daer Reservoir and dam

Daer Reservoir is a man-made waterbody created by the damming of the Daer Water, a tributary of the River Clyde in the Southern Uplands of Scotland. It lies within the Lowther Hills in South Lanarkshire. It is accessible by a minor public road leaving the A702 follows the Daer Water south to the dam and then continues along the western margin of the reservoir as far as Kirkhope. The reservoir was officially opened by Elizabeth II in 1956 to supply water to the Scottish Central Belt.

== Recreation ==
Season tickets for fishing in the reservoir for brown trout are available from Kilbryde Angling Club. The Southern Upland Way passes just to the north of the dam and affords views over the reservoir for the walker.
