= List of mountains of the British Isles by height (1501–2000) =

Highest mountains in Great Britain ("Simms" classification)
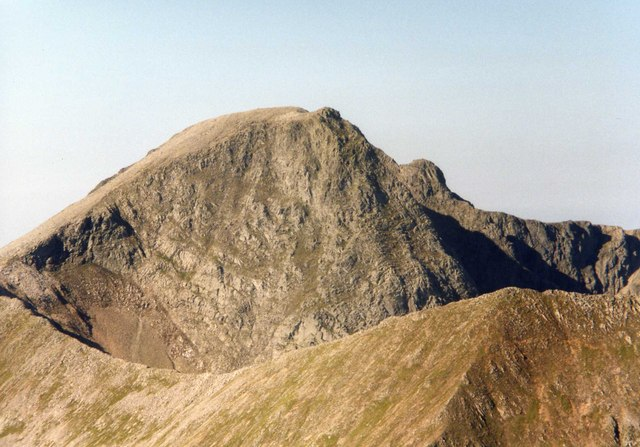
- Ben Nevis, in the Scottish Highlands, is the highest mountain in The British Isles

Highest point
- Elevation: over 600 m (1,969 ft)
- Prominence: over 30 m (98 ft)

Geography
- Location: 2,756 British Isles: 2,192 Scotland; 223 Ireland (Note: As of October 2018, the Irish MountainViews Online Database, list the prominence of Knockbrinnea (W) as 29m, and Carrignabinnia as 27 m, and thus they do not qualify as Irish Arderins, which means that MountainViews does not classify these two peaks as Simms; the total number of Irish Arderins over 600 m is thus 222. The DoBIH however uses the Harvey Tables which list the prominence for both at 30 m, and thus the DoBIH class them as Irish Simms, giving 224 Irish Simms in total.); 192 England; 150 Wales; 1 Isle of Man

This article provides access to lists of mountains in Britain and Ireland by height and by prominence. (See Lists of mountains below.) Height and prominence are the most important metrics for the classifications of mountains by the UIAA; with isolation a distant third criterion. (Note: No definition of a British Isles mountain or hill uses an explicit quantitative metric of topographic isolation (e.g. distance to the next point of equal height), however, the concept of isolation is embedded in the qualitative definition of a Scottish Munro, from the Scottish Mountaineering Club requirement of "sufficient separation" (instead of prominence).) The list is sourced from the Database of British and Irish Hills ("DoBIH") (Note: The Database of British and Irish Hills ("DoBIH") is the most referenced database for the classification of peaks in the British Isles, and the DoBIH is licensed under a "Creative Commons Attribution 3.0 Unported License".) for peaks that meet the consensus height threshold for a mountain, namely 600 metres (1,969 ft); the list also rules out peaks with a prominence below 30 metres (98 ft) and thus, the list is therefore precisely a list of the 2,756 (Note: Some sites list 2753 Simms, however, the Database of British and Irish Hills ("DoBIH") has added an extra Irish Simm, Knockbrinnea (W), bringing the total as at October 2022 to 2756.) Simms in the British Isles (as at October 2022). Many classifications of mountains in the British Isles consider a prominence between 30–150 metres (98–492 ft) as being a "top", and not a mountain; however, using the 30 metres (98 ft) prominence threshold gives the broadest possible list of mountains. For a ranking of mountains with a higher prominence threshold use:

- List of Marilyns in the British Isles, for ranking by height and by prominence, of peaks with prominence over 150 metres (492 ft); or
- List of P600 mountains in the British Isles, for ranking by height and by prominence, of peaks with prominence over 600 metres (1,969 ft)

== Coverage of Simms ==
Despite using the lower threshold for prominence of 30 metres (98 ft), the UIAA threshold for an "independent" peak, one Scottish Munro is missing, namely Maoile Lunndaidh whose official prominence changed to 11 metres (36 ft) in 2014; (Note: 281 of the 282 Scottish Munros have an official OSI prominence above 30 m, except Maoile Lunndaidh, who was found in a 2014 survey to be lower than nearby Creag Toll a' Choin. Thus, Maoile Lunndaidh had its official prominence downgraded from 400 m to just under 11 m, and the 400 m of prominence given to Creag Toll a' Choin. Note that Creag Toll a' Choin had previously been a Munro until older surveys downgraded its status in favour of Maoile Lunndaidh.) (Note: There is no known "composite" list of British Isles mountains that merges the Munro definition with other defined lists; the closest defined lists that include almost all Munros, are those that reduce the minimum prominence threshold to 30 metres (98 ft).) As of October 2018, the list of 2,754 British Isles Simms contained:

1. 281 of the 282 Munros, and 158 of the 226 Munro Tops;
2. All 222 Corbetts, all 219 Grahams, and all 118 Scottish New Donalds;
3. 872 of the 2,011 British Isles Marilyns;
4. All 524 of the England, Wales, and Ireland Hewitts;
5. 117 of the 541 Lake District Birketts (of which 99 are Wainwrights), that meet the Simms criteria;
6. All 224 of the 407 Irish Arderins with a height above 600.0 m;
7. All of the 120 P600 ("major") mountains in the British Isles;
8. 33 of the 34 England, Wales and Ireland Furths. (Note: 33 of the 34 SMC Furths have a prominence above 30 metres (98 feet), however, Caher West Top in Ireland, has a prominence of 24 metres (79 feet).)

== Simms by height by prominence ==
This list was downloaded from the DoBIH in October 2018, and includes all British and Irish peaks with a prominence below 30 metres (98 ft). Note that topographical prominence is complex to measure and requires a survey of the entire contours of a peak, rather than a single point of height. These tables are therefore subject to being revised over time, and should not be amended or updated unless the entire DoBIH data is re-downloaded again. The default table ranking is by height, so where the table is sorted by for example Region, the table will list the mountains within each Region by order of height.

Regional Top: The highest mountain in England, Wales, Scotland, Ireland, or the Isle of Man

== Lists of mountains ==
- List of mountains of the British Isles by height (1–500)
- List of mountains of the British Isles by height (501–1000)
- List of mountains of the British Isles by height (1001–1500)
- List of mountains of the British Isles by height (1501–2000)
- List of mountains of the British Isles by height (2001–2500)
- List of mountains of the British Isles by height (2501–3000)

Britain and Ireland mountains ranked by height and by prominence, Simms classification (DoBIH, October 2018)
Height Total	Prom. Total	Region	Height Region	Prom. Region	Name	Height (m)	Prom. (m)	Height (ft)	Prom. (ft)	Map Sec.	Topo Map	OS Grid Reference	Classification (§ DoBIH codes)
1501	266	Scotland	1293	197	Green Lowther	732	424	2,402	1,391	27C	71 78	[55.38958621217;-3.738054439175 NS900120]	Ma,G,Sim,D
1502	1404	Scotland	1294	1081	Glenrath Heights	732	87	2,402	285	28B	73	[55.577518345466;-3.2054295139279 NT241322]	Sim,D
1503	62	Scotland	1295	48	Beinn na Caillich	732	696	2,402	2,283	17C	32	[57.236427122464;-5.9771923129315 NG601232]	Ma,G,Sim
1504	363	Scotland	1296	266	Sgurr a' Gharaidh	732	333	2,402	1,093	13B	24	[57.439563627686;-5.5273961387642 NG884443]	Ma,G,Sim
1505	449	Scotland	1297	332	Glas Bheinn	732	292	2,402	958	10C	34	[56.981087830224;-5.0113790504706 NN171918]	Ma,G,Sim
1506	789	Scotland	1298	593	Sabhal Beag	732	169	2,402	554	16B	9	[58.344321048383;-4.7813685650602 NC373429]	Ma,G,Sim
1507	854	Scotland	1299	644	Beinn na Caillich	732	154	2,402	505	17C	33	[57.242282835876;-5.697549880202 NG770229]	Ma,G,Sim
1508	1173	Scotland	1300	896	Creagan Gorm	732	108	2,402	354	08A	36	[57.187376842448;-3.6925593514016 NH978120]	Hu,Sim
1509	2583	Scotland	1301	2045	Cadha Ruadh	732	33	2,402	108	12B	25	[57.345674936874;-5.3105313128304 NH009332]	Sim
1510	537	Scotland	1302	397	Stob an Eas	732	248	2,402	814	19C	56	[56.224418738316;-4.9291292805769 NN185074]	Ma,G,Sim
1511	1560	Scotland	1303	1212	Dog Hillock	732	75	2,402	246	07A	44	[56.900424133305;-3.1738419723836 NO286794]	Sim
1512	2219	Scotland	1304	1739	Ciochan a' Chop	731	43	2,399	140	02A	52	[56.672418902464;-3.9468520073047 NN808551]	Sim
1513	952	Scotland	1305	719	Carn nam Feuaich	731	138	2,399	452	11B	34	[57.166939285637;-5.0198684690742 NH175125]	Hu,Sim
1514	192	Scotland	1306	135	Suilven	731	496	2,398	1,627	16F	15	[58.114998277656;-5.1370672884343 NC153183]	Ma,G,Sim
1515	396	Scotland	1307	294	Beinn Dearg Mhor	731	316	2,398	1,037	17B	32	[57.278702204962;-6.116236834812 NG520284]	Ma,G,Sim
1516	1915	Scotland	1308	1492	Creagan Meall Horn	731	55	2,398	180	16B	9	[58.368390202049;-4.831150307939 NC345457]	Sim
1517	1286	Ireland	73	140	Cnoc an Bhraca	731	96	2,398	315	50C	78	[52.009389125808;-9.6639041738965 V858854]	Sim,Hew,Dil,A,VL,sHu
1518	2455	Scotland	1309	1937	Gannoch	731	36	2,398	118	07B	44	[56.980435452954;-2.8308377287802 NO496880]	Sim
1519	1335	Scotland	1310	1026	Sgurr na h-Eanchainne	731	91	2,398	300	18B	40	[56.740648157083;-5.2783551634686 NM996658]	Sim,sHu
1520	1601	Scotland	1311	1243	A' Chairidh	730	72	2,395	236	01A	51 52	[56.459267691468;-3.9586516570585 NN794314]	Sim
1521	2325	England	80	159	Kentmere Pike	730	39	2,395	128	34C	90	[54.461844852948;-2.8268332101509 NY465077]	Sim,Hew,N,W,B,Sy,Fel
1522	2430	Scotland	1312	1915	Swatte Fell	730	36	2,395	119	28B	78	[55.387705111021;-3.3938177310596 NT118113]	Sim,D
1523	456	Scotland	1313	335	Beinn na Gainimh	729	287	2,393	942	01A	52	[56.487286057844;-3.8902553505708 NN837344]	Ma,G,Sim
1524	157	Scotland	1314	109	Ben Venue	729	545	2,392	1,788	01C	57	[56.224699741048;-4.4628791052733 NN474063]	Ma,G,Sim
1525	1548	Scotland	1315	1201	Creag a' Chrochaidh	729	76	2,392	249	06A	43	[56.865202091929;-3.730469981306 NN946762]	Sim
1526	206	Scotland	1316	147	Uisgneabhal Mor	729	482	2,392	1,581	24B	13 14	[57.972199457877;-6.8726716639089 NB120085]	Ma,G,Sim
1527	767	Scotland	1317	574	Meall Doire Faid	729	175	2,392	574	15A	20	[57.767037628414;-4.9941348773646 NH220792]	Ma,G,Sim
1528	1068	Scotland	1318	816	Glas Bheinn	729	121	2,392	397	13B	25	[57.437708829028;-5.4972110247626 NG902440]	Hu,Sim
1529	1549	Scotland	1319	1202	Druim Fada West Top	729	76	2,392	249	10D	41	[56.890456190394;-5.1863674642688 NN060822]	Sim
1530	1820	Scotland	1320	1418	Sgurr a' Ghlaisein	729	60	2,392	197	12A	26	[57.47454264747;-4.7349255412851 NH361460]	Sim
1531	1966	Scotland	1321	1532	Creag Coire Doe	729	53	2,392	174	09B	34	[57.123871210017;-4.5735158516661 NH443066]	Sim
1532	1498	Scotland	1322	1160	Creag an Dubh Shluic	728	79	2,388	259	06B	43	[56.800878123519;-3.4933244438748 NO089687]	Sim
1533	1529	Scotland	1323	1186	Sgurr Breac	728	77	2,388	253	10D	33 40	[56.972468169796;-5.5456267041055 NM846924]	Sim
1534	2207	Scotland	1324	1733	Carn Gearresith	728	43	2,388	141	09B	35	[57.172852091872;-4.2708598109422 NH628114]	Sim
1535	610	Scotland	1325	458	Carnan Cruithneachd	728	220	2,388	722	11A	25 33	[57.278657281933;-5.3294020381254 NG994258]	Ma,G,Sim
1536	1484	Scotland	1326	1149	Stob an Duibhe	727	80	2,385	262	01C	50 56	[56.303805909055;-4.5940679875709 NN396154]	Sim
1537	2640	Scotland	1327	2089	Ben Venue East Top	727	32	2,385	105	01C	57	[56.223000717461;-4.4579304340751 NN477061]	Sim
1538	2038	Scotland	1328	1593	Caisteal Abhail Far East Top	727	50	2,385	164	20C	62 69	[55.649953437791;-5.2183355247696 NR976443]	Sim
1539	706	Scotland	1329	531	Mullach Coire nan Geur-oirean	727	191	2,385	627	10D	41	[56.952779552394;-5.2097839884262 NN049892]	Ma,G,Sim
1540	1199	Scotland	1330	918	A' Bhuidheanaich	727	105	2,385	344	09B	35	[57.150028907781;-4.0297415145355 NH773084]	Hu,Sim
1541	2294	Scotland	1331	1803	Creag Coire Doe South Top	727	40	2,385	131	09B	34	[57.120145947785;-4.5798657557798 NH439062]	Sim
1542	1627	England	81	108	Hindscarth	727	71	2,385	233	34B	89 90	[54.537657703053;-3.2147612839805 NY215165]	Sim,Hew,N,W,B,Sy,Fel
1543	2456	Wales	58	140	Pen Pumlumon Llygad-bychan	727	36	2,385	118	31A	135	[52.468563744446;-3.7708785861333 SN798871]	Sim,Hew,N
1544	1602	Scotland	1332	1244	Cock Cairn	727	72	2,385	236	07B	44	[56.985440784417;-2.8868973276454 NO462886]	Sim
1545	1392	Scotland	1333	1073	Creag Leacagach	726	88	2,382	289	06B	43	[56.836807483207;-3.6373633525591 NO002729]	Sim
1546	509	Wales	59	33	Moel Eilio	726	259	2,382	850	30B	115	[53.096883349078;-4.1595344148999 SH555577]	Ma,Sim,Hew,N
1547	1088	England	82	77	Ullscarf	726	118	2,382	387	34B	89 90	[54.499245352859;-3.0962657352748 NY291121]	Hu,Sim,Hew,N,W,B,Sy,Fel
1548	1174	England	83	86	Clough Head	726	108	2,382	354	34C	90	[54.59326386152;-3.0337869350066 NY333225]	Hu,Sim,Hew,N,W,B,Sy,Fel
1549	1645	Ireland	74	163	Seefin	726	70	2,382	230	54A	75	[52.212774342473;-7.5998750737853 S274068]	Sim,Hew,Dil,A,VL
1550	814	Scotland	1334	613	Mam Hael	726	161	2,382	528	03B	50	[56.516929516146;-5.2394812518678 NN008408]	Ma,G,Sim
1551	2056	Scotland	1335	1609	Hill of Glansie	726	49	2,382	161	07B	44	[56.816191857275;-2.9353136400834 NO430698]	Sim
1552	2183	Scotland	1336	1711	Cairn Culchavie	726	44	2,382	144	08B	36	[57.146888478761;-3.3237764772159 NJ200070]	Sim
1553	325	Scotland	1337	240	Beinn a' Chearcaill	725	368	2,379	1,207	13A	19	[57.615625313853;-5.4674014517813 NG930637]	Ma,G,Sim
1554	467	Wales	60	29	Fan Gyhirych	725	280	2,379	919	32A	160	[51.859209512951;-3.6277630399923 SN880191]	Ma,Sim,Hew,N
1555	2295	Scotland	1338	1804	Creagan nan Gabhar	725	40	2,379	131	01B	51 57	[56.352006868374;-4.2428594799293 NN615200]	Sim
1556	2412	Scotland	1339	1900	Lowther Hill	725	37	2,379	121	27C	71 78	[55.377685069797;-3.753315801964 NS890107]	Sim,D
1557	660	Ireland	75	83	Djouce	725	203	2,379	666	55B	56	[53.130503736232;-6.2407939473691 O178103]	Ma,Sim,Hew,Dil,A,VL
1558	70	Ireland	76	12	Binn Bhan	725	682	2,379	2,238	47B	37	[53.521211806992;-9.832627773952 L785539]	Ma,Sim,Hew,Dil,A,VL,CoH,CoU
1559	261	England	84	10	Ingleborough	724	427	2,375	1,401	35B	98	[54.16564156118;-2.398183365141 SD741745]	Ma,Sim,Hew,N
1560	1603	Scotland	1340	1245	Sron na Gaoithe	724	72	2,375	236	12B	25	[57.322271470269;-5.3117477838593 NH007306]	Sim
1561	2003	Scotland	1341	1565	Cnap na Stri	724	51	2,375	167	11B	34	[57.231224858841;-5.0002653756966 NH190196]	Sim
1562	2363	Scotland	1342	1861	Beinn Chlianaig	724	38	2,375	125	04A	41	[56.863692066745;-4.803374676104 NN292782]	Sim
1563	351	Scotland	1343	257	Meall nan Damh	723	347	2,372	1,138	18B	40	[56.814398545606;-5.4110080149885 NM919744]	Ma,G,Sim
1564	1048	Scotland	1344	799	Meall Meadhonach	723	124	2,372	407	16F	15	[58.110075054778;-5.1179557035152 NC164177]	Hu,Sim
1565	1712	Scotland	1345	1332	Creagan a' Chaise	723	66	2,372	217	04A	41	[56.797951073724;-4.7689790849903 NN310708]	Sim
1566	2235	Scotland	1346	1753	Carn Bhrunachain	723	42	2,372	138	09C	34 41	[56.964819704581;-4.7418669342326 NN334893]	Sim
1567	2684	Scotland	1347	2129	Tampie	723	31	2,372	102	07B	44	[56.968758446455;-2.8305777030213 NO496867]	Sim
1568	1240	Ireland	77	133	Seefingan	723	101	2,372	331	55B	56	[53.191734137722;-6.3759427504687 O086169]	Hu,Sim,Hew,Dil,A,VL
1569	1628	Scotland	1348	1265	Bioran na Circe	722	71	2,369	233	01C	57	[56.275796914677;-4.3304700382936 NN558117]	Sim
1570	1316	Scotland	1349	1012	Cape Law	722	93	2,369	305	28B	78	[55.421174269558;-3.3744568517385 NT131150]	Sim,D,sHu
1571	2457	Scotland	1350	1938	Meall an Daimh	722	36	2,369	118	06B	43	[56.756369577938;-3.7385457576955 NN938641]	Sim
1572	370	Scotland	1351	273	Creagan a' Chaise	722	330	2,369	1,083	21A	36	[57.298670223984;-3.488549166977 NJ104241]	Ma,G,Sim
1573	594	Scotland	1352	445	Meall Mheinnidh	722	227	2,369	745	14A	19	[57.716244279676;-5.4367133599707 NG954748]	Ma,G,Sim
1574	1055	Scotland	1353	805	Hallival	722	123	2,369	404	17D	39	[56.983314485344;-6.2894260839979 NM395962]	Hu,Sim
1575	1691	Scotland	1354	1314	Sgurr an Iubhair	722	67	2,369	220	18B	41	[56.796469849946;-5.2750385484355 NN001720]	Sim
1576	2057	Scotland	1355	1610	Carn Dubh	722	49	2,369	161	09B	35	[57.195327710524;-4.0620208069213 NH755135]	Sim
1577	2326	Scotland	1356	1826	Meall nan Damh West Top	722	39	2,369	128	18B	40	[56.815833457423;-5.4242520269668 NM911746]	Sim
1578	2184	Scotland	1357	1712	Creagan nan Gabhar	722	44	2,369	144	08A	43	[57.010947554878;-3.6499505926675 NN999923]	Sim
1579	1795	Scotland	1358	1400	Meall Ailein	722	62	2,367	202	16D	16	[58.24937330634;-4.364877563141 NC613314]	Sim
1580	309	Scotland	1359	229	Beinn Bharrain - Mullach Buidhe	721	385	2,367	1,263	20C	62 69	[55.632420098783;-5.3360900709277 NR901427]	Ma,G,Sim
1581	2659	Scotland	1360	2107	Little Garvoun	721	32	2,367	103	08B	36	[57.163612805702;-3.4368162422428 NJ132090]	Sim
1582	87	Ireland	78	14	Slieve Carr	721	648	2,365	2,126	46B	23	[54.067359238509;-9.6595349578515 F914144]	Ma,Sim,Hew,Dil,A,VL
1583	620	Scotland	1361	467	Stob Mhic Bheathain	721	215	2,365	705	18B	40	[56.786375289516;-5.4166508785441 NM914713]	Ma,G,Sim
1584	909	Scotland	1362	685	Meall Mor	721	144	2,365	472	04A	41	[56.794160127121;-4.8178350028424 NN280705]	Hu,Sim,sMa
1585	1413	Scotland	1363	1087	Sgurr na Laocainn	721	86	2,365	282	14A	19	[57.739164478141;-5.3867842263975 NG985772]	Sim
1586	2058	Scotland	1364	1611	Carn Easgann Bana East Top	721	49	2,365	161	09B	35	[57.112337731565;-4.4769149705362 NH501051]	Sim
1587	2413	England	85	167	Red Beck Top	721	37	2,365	121	34B	89 90	[54.476971546051;-3.1712920762243 NY242097]	Sim,Hew,N,B,Sy
1588	90	Ireland	79	15	Slievenamon	721	643	2,365	2,110	54B	67	[52.427427795993;-7.5641207787083 S297307]	Ma,Sim,Hew,Dil,A,VL
1589	121	Scotland	1365	83	Ben Cleuch	721	595	2,365	1,952	26A	58	[56.185328363646;-3.7706405459795 NN902006]	Ma,G,Sim,D,CoH,CoU
1590	522	Scotland	1366	384	The Buck	721	255	2,365	837	21A	37	[57.29649631137;-2.9773416127542 NJ412233]	Ma,G,Sim
1591	1499	Scotland	1367	1161	Fasheilach	721	79	2,365	259	07B	44	[56.957838702788;-3.0835621002098 NO342857]	Sim
1592	1224	Wales	61	72	Pen Allt-mawr	720	102	2,362	335	32A	161	[51.911550388792;-3.1557005122942 SO206243]	Hu,Sim,Hew,N
1593	1550	Scotland	1368	1203	Mulla bho Thuath	720	76	2,362	249	24B	13 14	[57.972593725383;-6.8388631084118 NB140084]	Sim
1594	164	Scotland	1369	113	Ben Stack	720	531	2,362	1,742	16E	9	[58.33406109758;-4.9582592009076 NC269422]	Ma,G,Sim
1595	1422	Scotland	1370	1094	Sgurr nan Each	720	85	2,362	279	17B	32	[57.228549247381;-6.0824528722159 NG537227]	Sim
1596	2414	Scotland	1371	1901	Sron Liath	720	37	2,362	121	10D	40	[56.919918063708;-5.3318775538236 NM973859]	Sim
1597	332	Wales	62	20	Rhinog Fawr	720	363	2,362	1,191	30D	124	[52.841691502635;-3.9968730126191 SH656290]	Ma,Sim,Hew,N
1598	1561	England	86	103	Froswick	720	75	2,362	246	34C	90	[54.468708030854;-2.8732603539703 NY435085]	Sim,Hew,N,W,B,Sy,Fel
1599	1735	Ireland	80	169	Duff Hill	720	65	2,362	213	55B	56	[53.11345073461;-6.3684407826395 O093082]	Sim,Hew,Dil,A,VL
1600	478	Scotland	1372	351	Meall Buidhe	719	273	2,359	896	01A	51	[56.41817535791;-4.3099876794751 NN576275]	Ma,G,Sim
1601	1786	Scotland	1373	1394	Creag Mhor	719	62	2,359	203	02B	51	[56.474576959377;-4.4157153221261 NN513340]	Sim
1602	2296	Scotland	1374	1805	Meall nan Tarmachan	719	40	2,359	131	01C	50 56	[56.329394002531;-4.6588979392109 NN357184]	Sim
1603	2236	Scotland	1375	1754	The Scrape	719	42	2,359	138	28B	72	[55.578257875929;-3.3085585706466 NT176324]	Sim,DT
1604	74	Scotland	1376	55	The Storr	719	671	2,359	2,201	17A	23	[57.506685778693;-6.1836841680996 NG495540]	Ma,G,Sim
1605	1574	Scotland	1377	1224	Creag Tharsuinn	719	74	2,359	243	09C	34 41	[56.957850230001;-4.6903600590606 NN365884]	Sim
1606	2185	Scotland	1378	1713	Sail Romascaig	719	44	2,359	144	16B	9	[58.39519590143;-4.5834239430191 NC491481]	Sim
1607	1875	Scotland	1379	1461	Benyellary	719	57	2,359	187	27B	77	[55.124020649145;-4.4887563183898 NX414839]	Sim,DT
1608	2327	England	87	160	Whiteside East Top	719	39	2,359	128	34B	89 90	[54.587334662472;-3.2781394395633 NY175221]	Sim,Hew,N,B,Sy
1609	979	Scotland	1380	741	Beinn an t-Seilich	719	134	2,359	440	19C	56	[56.229475261025;-4.9053097245152 NN200079]	Hu,Sim
1610	1185	Scotland	1381	906	Beinn Lurachan	719	107	2,359	351	03C	50	[56.459617353804;-4.9796931194633 NN165337]	Hu,Sim
1611	1393	Scotland	1382	1074	The Socach	719	88	2,359	289	21A	37	[57.215555680011;-3.195422717056 NJ279145]	Sim
1612	2501	Scotland	1383	1976	Buachaille Breige West Top	719	35	2,359	115	06B	43	[56.953864828119;-3.6178288832105 NO017859]	Sim
1613	1500	Scotland	1384	1162	Creag Cam a' Choire	718	79	2,356	259	06B	43	[56.853912017609;-3.6348307050821 NO004748]	Sim
1614	603	Scotland	1385	453	An Stac	718	223	2,356	732	10D	40	[56.942013091094;-5.5098362746425 NM866889]	Ma,G,Sim
1615	910	Scotland	1386	686	Meall Bhasiter	718	144	2,356	472	10B	33 40	[57.014608383574;-5.5496410011982 NM846971]	Hu,Sim,sMa
1616	1423	Scotland	1387	1095	Breabag North Top	718	85	2,356	279	16E	15	[58.116994526801;-4.90117689892 NC292179]	Sim
1617	2543	Scotland	1388	2008	Tatha nam Beann	718	34	2,356	112	16B	9	[58.320363701261;-4.8085202100184 NC356403]	Sim
1618	1036	Ireland	81	114	Gravale	718	126	2,356	413	55B	56	[53.124002400884;-6.3516082721187 O104094]	Hu,Sim,Hew,Dil,A,VL
1619	1449	Scotland	1389	1117	Fraochaidh East Top	718	82	2,356	269	03B	41	[56.619967574321;-5.1830884456207 NN048521]	Sim
1620	1233	Scotland	1390	942	Cnoc an Tiumpain	718	102	2,355	333	09B	35	[57.154044845553;-4.0035078617633 NH789088]	Hu,Sim
1621	2246	Scotland	1391	1764	Middle Hill	717	42	2,353	137	28B	72	[55.551018474738;-3.3346010012525 NT159294]	Sim,D
1622	2328	Scotland	1392	1827	Meall na Fearna West Top	717	39	2,352	128	01B	57	[56.344738441428;-4.1971219532806 NN643191]	Sim
1623	1713	Scotland	1393	1333	Stob a' Chuir	717	66	2,352	217	18B	40	[56.790364927144;-5.4350328905656 NM903718]	Sim
1624	2164	Scotland	1394	1695	Beinn an Aodainn East Top	717	45	2,352	148	10B	33 40	[57.027277938003;-5.4502879151598 NM907982]	Sim
1625	2364	Scotland	1395	1862	Speicein Coinnich	717	38	2,352	125	16F	15	[57.98571423459;-5.2035873635653 NC107041]	Sim
1626	236	Scotland	1396	171	Lamachan Hill	717	453	2,352	1,486	27B	77	[55.061844163128;-4.4520058249077 NX435769]	Ma,G,Sim,D
1627	181	Scotland	1397	125	Ben Buie	717	514	2,352	1,686	17E	49	[56.374401550138;-5.8819422176599 NM604270]	Ma,G,Sim
1628	1287	Scotland	1398	986	Beinn Bhreac	716	96	2,349	315	01A	51 52	[56.536674540892;-4.0618539462026 NN733402]	Sim,sHu,GT
1629	440	England	88	25	Great Shunner Fell	716	297	2,349	974	35A	98	[54.370081035868;-2.2354643997798 SD848972]	Ma,Sim,Hew,N
1630	916	Scotland	1399	692	Carn Loch na Gobhlaig	716	143	2,349	469	11A	25	[57.328024362241;-4.8968263980886 NH257301]	Hu,Sim,sMa
1631	2544	Scotland	1400	2009	Beinn an Eoin North Top	716	34	2,349	112	13A	19 24	[57.634672849774;-5.526204492817 NG896660]	Sim
1632	2545	Scotland	1401	2010	Craig Damff	716	34	2,349	112	07B	44	[56.902500671574;-3.0409106524834 NO367795]	Sim
1633	2740	Scotland	1402	2177	Carn Chomh-Stri	716	30	2,348	98	07A	43	[56.83053227395;-3.4158390508067 NO137719]	Sim
1634	1755	Scotland	1403	1368	Casteal na h-Iolaire	715	63	2,346	207	20C	62 69	[55.627762317687;-5.3420503040785 NR897422]	Sim
1635	2084	Scotland	1404	1629	Taobh na Coille	715	48	2,346	157	01C	57	[56.304327632784;-4.4809361073779 NN466152]	Sim
1636	2186	Scotland	1405	1714	Ardnandave Hill	715	44	2,346	144	01C	57	[56.28235340864;-4.3163282300187 NN567124]	Sim
1637	823	Scotland	1406	619	Cnap Chaochan Aitinn	715	159	2,346	522	08B	36	[57.171939257384;-3.4156380878288 NJ145099]	Ma,G,Sim
1638	1714	Scotland	1407	1334	The Bruach	715	66	2,346	217	08B	36	[57.131915343428;-3.4587180821293 NJ118055]	Sim
1639	980	Scotland	1408	742	Meall an Aonaich	715	134	2,346	440	16E	15	[58.105215278512;-4.8255227252664 NC336164]	Hu,Sim
1640	1936	Scotland	1409	1508	Meall a' Chocaire	715	54	2,346	177	09B	35	[57.141573007224;-4.0524177135015 NH759075]	Sim
1641	2039	Scotland	1410	1594	Mam a' Chroisg	715	50	2,346	164	10C	34	[57.129236017031;-4.8647449643811 NH267079]	Sim
1642	2237	Scotland	1411	1755	Maol Odhar East Top	715	42	2,346	138	18C	49	[56.666073751208;-5.4432961189499 NM891580]	Sim
1643	2329	Scotland	1412	1828	Creag a' Mhaigh	715	39	2,346	128	04B	34 42	[56.919313852017;-4.4673936196845 NN499836]	Sim
1644	2415	Scotland	1413	1902	Cairn Vungie	715	37	2,346	121	09B	34	[57.129492261725;-4.5623384200666 NH450072]	Sim
1645	1802	England	89	122	Brandreth	715	61	2,346	200	34B	89 90	[54.496311864401;-3.2150785832682 NY214119]	Sim,Hew,N,W,B,Sy,Fel
1646	2040	England	90	137	Lonscale Fell	715	50	2,346	164	34A	89 90	[54.633937793052;-3.109182190778 NY285271]	Sim,Hew,N,W,B,Sy,Fel
1647	1133	Ireland	82	118	Meenteog	715	112	2,346	367	50A	78 83	[51.979281914781;-9.983003801732 V638826]	Hu,Sim,Hew,Dil,A,VL
1648	530	Scotland	1414	390	Beinn Mheadhonach	715	252	2,346	827	03B	50	[56.481515043554;-5.218589771225 NN019368]	Ma,G,Sim
1649	1305	Scotland	1415	1003	Wolf Craig	715	94	2,346	308	07B	44	[56.927825999053;-3.0202565628702 NO380823]	Sim,sHu
1650	1256	Scotland	1416	960	Stob Creag an Fhithich	715	99	2,345	326	01C	50 56	[56.33450046297;-4.6721973968543 NN349190]	Sim,sHu
1651	890	England	91	60	Hedgehope Hill	714	147	2,344	483	33	80	[55.471095074584;-2.0917174123019 NT943197]	Hu,Sim,Hew,N,sMa
1652	160	Ireland	83	34	Corranabinnia	714	540	2,343	1,772	46B	30	[53.965650792085;-9.6722541979746 F903031]	Ma,Sim,Hew,Dil,A,VL
1653	1249	Scotland	1417	954	An Garadh	714	100	2,343	328	01C	56	[56.293339409406;-4.5788123898616 NN405142]	Hu,Sim
1654	1414	Scotland	1418	1088	Carn Dearg Mor	714	86	2,343	282	09B	35 36	[57.194494277449;-3.886528761736 NH861131]	Sim
1655	1803	Scotland	1419	1405	Creag na h-Iolaire Ard	714	61	2,343	200	16E	15	[58.205807224321;-5.0616495363927 NC202282]	Sim
1656	2165	Scotland	1420	1696	Carn Easgainn Mor	714	45	2,343	148	09B	35	[57.216889087881;-4.1162221735302 NH723160]	Sim
1657	2416	Scotland	1421	1903	Carn Caol	714	37	2,343	121	09B	35	[57.217933228497;-4.0533447204573 NH761160]	Sim
1658	2641	Scotland	1422	2090	Carn na Saobhaidh	714	32	2,343	105	09B	26 35	[57.287335171424;-4.1999168853455 NH675240]	Sim
1659	2741	Scotland	1423	2178	The Storr East Top	714	30	2,343	98	17A	23	[57.506796287941;-6.1803553659118 NG497540]	Sim
1660	2685	Scotland	1424	2130	Cnap nan Gobhar	714	31	2,343	102	17E	49	[56.378037594848;-5.8806918948834 NM605274]	Sim
1661	905	Scotland	1425	681	Sgurr Dhomhuill Mor	714	145	2,342	476	18A	40	[56.819495166134;-5.7049324414294 NM740759]	Hu,Sim,sMa
1662	327	Scotland	1426	242	Creag Mhor	713	367	2,339	1,204	16D	16	[58.185557359098;-4.2160382252044 NC698240]	Ma,G,Sim
1663	2458	Scotland	1427	1939	Meall nan Doireachan	713	36	2,339	118	15A	20	[57.760217957955;-4.9784368333357 NH229784]	Sim
1664	2584	Scotland	1428	2046	Carn na Saobhaidhe	713	33	2,339	108	09B	35	[57.108978064034;-4.4188865529652 NH536046]	Sim
1665	957	England	92	66	Branstree	713	137	2,339	449	34C	90	[54.4817497312;-2.8071700609411 NY478099]	Hu,Sim,Hew,N,W,B,Sy,Fel
1666	316	Scotland	1429	235	Beinn Chaorach	713	381	2,339	1,250	01E	56	[56.092695070639;-4.7551046236952 NS287923]	Ma,G,Sim
1667	2712	Scotland	1430	2155	Am Fireach	713	31	2,339	101	01C	57	[56.282141445899;-4.3276248786149 NN560124]	Sim
1668	686	Scotland	1431	518	Creag Ruadh	712	196	2,336	643	01A	51	[56.436264630262;-4.1537379186414 NN673292]	Ma,G,Sim
1669	2502	Scotland	1432	1977	Sron Eanchainne	712	35	2,336	115	02B	51	[56.523819194398;-4.4708809930239 NN481396]	Sim
1670	1876	Scotland	1433	1462	Sgor Chaonasaid	712	57	2,336	187	16B	10	[58.413396360751;-4.4340794967517 NC579498]	Sim
1671	2187	Scotland	1434	1715	Beinn Bhan	712	44	2,336	144	09B	34	[57.030032334718;-4.7598563284785 NN326966]	Sim
1672	882	Wales	63	56	Rhinog Fach	712	148	2,336	486	30D	124	[52.823922607466;-3.9841839092891 SH664270]	Hu,Sim,Hew,N,sMa
1673	1937	Scotland	1435	1509	Meall Tionail	712	54	2,336	177	06B	43	[56.942084662947;-3.6255376458717 NO012846]	Sim
1674	940	Scotland	1436	711	Beinn Bhreac	712	139	2,335	456	20C	62 69	[55.646090713579;-5.3293042392523 NR906442]	Hu,Sim
1675	1926	Scotland	1437	1501	Sron Direachain	711	55	2,334	179	06A	35 43	[56.987647254908;-3.8990923176339 NN847901]	Sim
1676	248	Scotland	1438	183	Tinto	711	442	2,333	1,450	27A	72	[55.591037606548;-3.6628455206962 NS953343]	Ma,G,Sim,D
1677	307	Scotland	1439	228	Beinn nan Ramh	711	386	2,333	1,266	14B	19	[57.646258030276;-5.1199513004878 NH139661]	Ma,G,Sim
1678	897	Scotland	1440	675	Meall an t-Suidhe	711	146	2,333	479	04A	41	[56.810266459148;-5.0500920788341 NN139729]	Hu,Sim,sMa
1679	1405	Scotland	1441	1082	Beinn Bhuidhe	711	87	2,333	285	09B	26 35	[57.26515274487;-4.2848322295234 NH623217]	Sim
1680	1938	Scotland	1442	1510	Ruadh Stac Beag	711	54	2,333	177	14A	19	[57.740089035295;-5.3179571438421 NH026771]	Sim
1681	2208	Scotland	1443	1734	Creag a' Chaillich	711	43	2,333	141	08A	36	[57.193437988413;-3.7093866287433 NH968127]	Sim
1682	171	Scotland	1444	119	Cairnsmore of Fleet	711	522	2,333	1,713	27B	83	[54.974992710429;-4.3435683627539 NX501670]	Ma,G,Sim,D
1683	426	Ireland	84	62	Binn Chorr	711	304	2,333	997	47B	37	[53.506539398015;-9.7928036129764 L811522]	Ma,Sim,Hew,Dil,A,VL
1684	1604	Scotland	1445	1246	Craig Veann	711	72	2,333	236	08B	36	[57.181701654207;-3.3448736918475 NJ188109]	Sim
1685	203	Scotland	1446	144	Druim Fada	711	484	2,332	1,588	10A	33	[57.117248900119;-5.4801412386349 NG894083]	Ma,G,Sim
1686	2706	Scotland	1447	2149	Stob Glas	711	31	2,331	101	01C	50 56	[56.344030195087;-4.6469694101006 NN365200]	Sim
1687	2654	Scotland	1448	2102	Meall Breac	711	32	2,331	104	06B	43	[56.757830803212;-3.6977187006951 NN963642]	Sim
1688	379	Scotland	1449	280	Meith Bheinn	710	325	2,329	1,066	10D	40	[56.924675202625;-5.5821889278926 NM821872]	Ma,G,Sim
1689	762	Scotland	1450	571	Beinn Tharsuinn	710	176	2,329	577	15B	20	[57.807446160733;-4.6742335154905 NH412829]	Ma,G,Sim
1690	1056	Scotland	1451	806	Meall Gorm	710	123	2,329	404	13B	24	[57.404074454405;-5.6988651857837 NG779409]	Hu,Sim
1691	748	Scotland	1452	562	Carn a' Ghille Chearr	710	179	2,329	587	21A	36	[57.350529915949;-3.4324787132853 NJ139298]	Ma,G,Sim,CoH
1692	1049	Wales	64	62	Moelwyn Bach	710	124	2,329	407	30B	124	[52.973853896499;-3.9970051910255 SH660437]	Hu,Sim,Hew,N
1693	1692	Scotland	1453	1315	Beninner	710	67	2,329	220	27C	77	[55.248294986904;-4.1959981108404 NX605971]	Sim,DT
1694	2585	England	93	177	Dead Stones	710	33	2,329	108	35A	91	[54.753616699834;-2.3231418101548 NY793399]	Sim,Hew,N
1695	557	England	94	34	Knott	710	242	2,329	794	34A	89 90	[54.686205819019;-3.0935437965661 NY296329]	Ma,Sim,Hew,N,W,B,Sy,Fel
1696	2004	Scotland	1454	1566	An t-Sron	710	51	2,329	167	07A	44	[56.945315892348;-3.1768964032705 NO285844]	Sim
1697	982	Scotland	1455	743	Sgurr na Laire Brice	709	134	2,326	439	10A	33	[57.157414178023;-5.4905346361346 NG890128]	Hu,Sim
1698	2263	Scotland	1456	1777	Beinn Leabhainn	709	41	2,326	135	01A	51	[56.425326569802;-4.3120431224549 NN575283]	Sim
1699	862	Scotland	1457	651	Beinn Dearg Mhor	709	152	2,326	499	17C	32	[57.232107047252;-5.9999398218879 NG587228]	Ma,G,Sim
1700	656	Wales	65	41	Trum y Ddysgl	709	204	2,326	669	30B	115	[53.041790503712;-4.1731881957333 SH544516]	Ma,Sim,Hew,N
1701	1134	England	95	83	High Seat	709	112	2,326	367	35A	91 92	[54.405869787281;-2.306534814346 NY802012]	Hu,Sim,Hew,N
1702	1939	England	96	130	Pike of Stickle	709	54	2,326	177	34B	89 90	[54.45586115837;-3.1228710215244 NY273073]	Sim,Hew,N,W,B,Sy,Fel
1703	2209	England	97	147	Melmerby Fell	709	43	2,326	141	35A	91	[54.735761131416;-2.5419793139602 NY652380]	Sim,Hew,N
1704	338	Scotland	1458	246	Beinn a' Mhanaich	709	358	2,326	1,175	01E	56	[56.112686459447;-4.7854912169527 NS269946]	Ma,G,Sim
1705	559	Scotland	1459	416	Beinn nan Lus	709	240	2,326	787	03C	50	[56.492333030233;-5.0391320955664 NN130375]	Ma,G,Sim
1706	1766	Scotland	1460	1377	Creag Dearg	709	63	2,326	207	07B	44	[56.974258742207;-3.0544275428753 NO360875]	Sim
1707	1394	Scotland	1461	1075	Meall Dubh-chlais	708	88	2,324	289	06A	43	[56.8942350834;-3.7744981215102 NN920795]	Sim
1708	343	Scotland	1462	251	Creag na h-Eararuidh	708	353	2,324	1,158	01B	57	[56.345026352908;-4.1291728292506 NN685190]	Ma,G,Sim
1709	1501	Scotland	1463	1163	Meall Bhalach	708	79	2,323	259	03A	41	[56.677634072018;-4.8434109166757 NN259576]	Sim
1710	2642	Scotland	1464	2091	Carn Liath-bhaid	708	32	2,323	105	09B	35	[57.167665253856;-4.4045245260079 NH547111]	Sim
1711	1940	England	98	131	Great Stony Hill	708	54	2,323	177	35A	91 92	[54.717786248188;-2.2762859782002 NY823359]	Sim,Hew,N
1712	356	England	99	20	Wild Boar Fell	708	344	2,323	1,129	35A	98	[54.38321142547;-2.3741127351453 SD758987]	Ma,Sim,Hew,N
1713	1464	Scotland	1465	1131	Beinn Bhreac	708	81	2,323	266	03B	49	[56.509073795788;-5.2648231798518 NM992400]	Sim
1714	2459	Scotland	1466	1940	Stob Mhic Mhartuin	707	36	2,320	118	03A	41	[56.674809818937;-4.9264663175935 NN208575]	Sim
1715	1580	Scotland	1467	1228	Beinn Dearg	707	74	2,319	241	01B	57	[56.35161538403;-4.1117367161101 NN696197]	Sim,xG
1716	137	Scotland	1468	93	Morven	706	574	2,316	1,883	16C	17	[58.233929073544;-3.6978455343976 ND004285]	Ma,G,Sim,CoH
1717	487	Scotland	1469	359	Carn a' Chaochain	706	269	2,316	883	11B	34	[57.215936813713;-4.9244757631098 NH235177]	Ma,G,Sim
1718	2166	Scotland	1470	1697	Stob Mhic Bheathain West Top	706	45	2,316	148	18B	40	[56.788886179661;-5.4234314555238 NM910716]	Sim
1719	2264	Scotland	1471	1778	Creag na h-Iolaire	706	41	2,316	135	13B	24	[57.440259917002;-5.5024561158511 NG899443]	Sim
1720	2365	England	100	161	Yoke	706	38	2,316	125	34C	90	[54.452555632197;-2.8698317357464 NY437067]	Sim,Hew,N,W,B,Sy,Fel
1721	111	Ireland	85	21	Knockboy	706	610	2,316	2,001	52A	85	[51.801966415387;-9.4445930492903 W004620]	Ma,Sim,Hew,Dil,A,VL,CoH,CoU
1722	2005	Scotland	1472	1567	Carn Mor	706	51	2,316	167	06B	43	[56.966389973621;-3.4769139064829 NO103871]	Sim
1723	2707	Scotland	1473	2150	Meall nan Caorach	706	31	2,315	101	16E	15	[58.160792944108;-4.9115454429253 NC288228]	Sim
1724	551	Scotland	1474	411	Ben Armine	705	243	2,313	797	16D	16	[58.215055742444;-4.2246868916138 NC694273]	Ma,G,Sim
1725	563	Scotland	1475	419	An Cruachan	705	237	2,313	778	12B	25	[57.372586037764;-5.1731929828464 NH093358]	Ma,G,Sim
1726	712	Scotland	1476	534	Meall a' Chaorainn	705	189	2,313	620	14B	19	[57.594969532224;-5.1222496377725 NH135604]	Ma,G,Sim
1727	817	Scotland	1477	615	Sgurr an Fhidhleir	705	160	2,313	525	16F	15	[57.996816832411;-5.2265856626096 NC094054]	Ma,G,Sim
1728	1465	Scotland	1478	1132	Ceann Beag	705	81	2,313	266	13A	19 24	[57.619673211388;-5.5482048661012 NG882644]	Sim
1729	2188	Scotland	1479	1716	Meall Bhalach East Top	705	44	2,313	144	03A	41	[56.673482018036;-4.8284042445755 NN268571]	Sim
1730	2210	Scotland	1480	1735	Tom na Caillich	705	43	2,313	141	15B	20	[57.650440553876;-4.6190852217542 NH438653]	Sim
1731	2460	Scotland	1481	1941	Spidean nan Clach	705	36	2,313	118	14A	19	[57.729259628816;-5.486680377727 NG925764]	Sim
1732	2686	Scotland	1482	2131	Ruadh Stac Beag South Top	705	31	2,313	102	14A	19	[57.732150400009;-5.3121882552032 NH029762]	Sim
1733	758	England	101	46	Pike of Blisco	705	177	2,313	581	34B	89 90	[54.427978174909;-3.1251912325329 NY271042]	Ma,Sim,Hew,N,W,B,Sy,Fel
1734	1395	Ireland	86	148	Stoompa	705	88	2,313	289	52A	79	[51.979892179543;-9.4473977550986 W006818]	Sim,Hew,Dil,A,VL
1735	740	Scotland	1483	558	Hunt Hill	705	181	2,313	594	07B	44	[56.911658557154;-3.0198154277556 NO380805]	Ma,G,Sim
1736	393	Scotland	1484	291	Corra-bheinn	705	317	2,313	1,040	17E	48	[56.418532141184;-5.9367360016347 NM573321]	Ma,G,Sim
1737	1356	Scotland	1485	1043	Meall Mor	704	90	2,310	296	01A	52	[56.491172733477;-3.8709566100972 NN849348]	Sim,sHu,GT
1738	454	England	102	26	Great Whernside	704	288	2,310	945	35B	98	[54.16090820166;-1.9984335744575 SE002739]	Ma,Sim,Hew,N
1739	1124	Scotland	1486	863	Creagan Ruadh	704	113	2,310	371	04B	42	[56.809312665012;-4.6174408998074 NN403717]	Hu,Sim
1740	1984	Scotland	1487	1549	Meall na Drochaide	704	52	2,310	171	15B	20	[57.693228556036;-4.5030267751837 NH509698]	Sim
1741	1005	Scotland	1488	763	Cruachan Dearg	704	130	2,310	427	17E	47 48	[56.428133955779;-5.9458436006705 NM568332]	Hu,Sim
1742	1877	Scotland	1489	1463	Carn Oighreag	704	57	2,310	187	08B	36	[57.147568566017;-3.2576880307916 NJ240070]	Sim
1743	1022	Scotland	1490	776	Beinn Chochan	703	128	2,306	420	01C	57	[56.218635624617;-4.4963636912491 NN453057]	Hu,Sim
1744	1853	Scotland	1491	1446	Meall Garbh	703	58	2,306	190	03C	50	[56.589115313461;-4.9393833330111 NN196480]	Sim
1745	2006	Scotland	1492	1568	Meall an Dubh-chadha	703	51	2,306	167	06A	35	[56.992421030928;-3.9964584482005 NN788908]	Sim
1746	855	Wales	66	55	Black Mountain	703	154	2,306	505	32A	161	[52.008412143966;-3.0868042721126 SO255350]	Ma,Sim,Hew,N,CoH,CoU,CoA
1747	923	England	103	62	Chapelfell Top	703	142	2,306	466	35A	91 92	[54.70715966283;-2.1955125792972 NY875347]	Hu,Sim,Hew,N,sMa
1748	1208	Ireland	87	128	Moanbane	703	104	2,306	341	55B	56	[53.102070149798;-6.4584586464008 O033068]	Hu,Sim,Hew,Dil,A,VL
1749	824	Scotland	1493	620	Beinn Eich	703	159	2,306	522	01E	56	[56.113871315197;-4.7324871251068 NS302946]	Ma,G,Sim
1750	320	Scotland	1494	237	Beinn Lochain	703	375	2,306	1,232	19C	56	[56.162446133039;-4.9646797359364 NN160006]	Ma,G,Sim
1751	687	Ireland	88	86	Slievelamagan	702	196	2,304	643	43B	29	[54.165854489455;-5.9674535711145 J328260]	Ma,Sim,Hew,Dil,A,VL
1752	1078	Scotland	1495	825	Beinn Bhuidhe	702	120	2,303	394	11A	25 33	[57.256527836351;-5.3837994847796 NG960235]	Hu,Sim
1753	646	England	104	39	Buckden Pike	702	207	2,303	679	35B	98	[54.204031101773;-2.0628192525716 SD960787]	Ma,Sim,Hew,N
1754	544	Scotland	1496	404	Belig	702	246	2,303	807	17B	32	[57.240519744937;-6.0738267641743 NG543240]	Ma,G,Sim
1755	713	Scotland	1497	535	Trollabhal	702	189	2,303	620	17D	39	[56.97333909063;-6.317919898347 NM377952]	Ma,G,Sim
1756	1967	Scotland	1498	1533	Beul Choire nan Each	702	53	2,303	174	18C	49	[56.596524062686;-5.5820055391797 NM802507]	Sim
1757	2546	Scotland	1499	2011	Meallan Odhar	702	34	2,303	112	09B	34	[57.027486472983;-4.7118731946461 NN355962]	Sim
1758	1406	England	105	95	Bowscale Fell	702	87	2,303	285	34A	90	[54.665145779447;-3.0356120619542 NY333305]	Sim,Hew,N,W,B,Sy,Fel
1759	97	Ireland	89	18	Binn idir an Dá Log	702	629	2,303	2,064	47C	37	[53.513611330976;-9.6770181026572 L888528]	Ma,Sim,Hew,Dil,A,VL
1760	771	Scotland	1500	578	Beinn Fhada	702	174	2,303	571	17E	47 48	[56.441919101139;-5.9927297473967 NM540349]	Ma,G,Sim
1761	498	Scotland	1501	367	Duchray Hill	702	264	2,303	866	07A	43	[56.788761840969;-3.374975837829 NO161672]	Ma,G,Sim
1762	729	Ireland	90	91	Slieve Meelbeg	702	184	2,303	604	43B	29	[54.183629102437;-6.0094758775441 J300279]	Ma,Sim,Hew,Dil,A,VL
1763	1985	Wales	67	117	Pen Cerrig-calch	701	52	2,300	171	32A	161	[51.894613040607;-3.1407331047781 SO216224]	Sim,Hew,N
1764	2547	Scotland	1502	2012	Stob Chalum Mhic Griogair South Top	701	34	2,300	112	01B	57	[56.338995012962;-4.1660500273557 NN662184]	Sim
1765	387	Scotland	1503	287	Carn a' Choin Deirg	701	319	2,300	1,047	15A	20	[57.891248471065;-4.7057686374957 NH397923]	Ma,G,Sim
1766	835	Scotland	1504	629	Sgurr nan Cnamh	701	157	2,300	515	18B	40	[56.722342259858;-5.4566185910582 NM886643]	Ma,G,Sim
1767	2041	Scotland	1505	1595	Teanga Chorrach	701	50	2,300	164	18B	40	[56.793121407933;-5.4975377965539 NM865723]	Sim
1768	2586	Scotland	1506	2047	Carn nan Suilean Dubha	701	33	2,300	108	09B	35	[57.179990154689;-3.9536228331017 NH820116]	Sim
1769	2131	England	106	146	Cold Pike	701	46	2,300	151	34B	89 90	[54.422457017042;-3.1389112991721 NY262036]	Sim,Hew,N,W,B,Sy,Fel
1770	514	Scotland	1507	377	Meall Garbh	701	257	2,300	843	03C	50	[56.486610710705;-4.9785610490759 NN167367]	Ma,G,Sim
1771	1502	Scotland	1508	1164	Doune Hill East Top	701	79	2,300	259	01E	56	[56.138785307055;-4.7439143239432 NS296974]	Sim
1772	566	Scotland	1509	421	Blackcraig Hill	701	236	2,300	774	27C	71 77	[55.332974781519;-4.1344598412404 NS647064]	Ma,G,Sim,D,CoU
1773	109	Ireland	91	20	Ben Gorm	700	612	2,297	2,008	47A	37	[53.624393224001;-9.7222179198522 L861652]	Ma,Sim,Hew,Dil,A,VL
1774	1986	Scotland	1510	1550	Beinn Bhreac	700	52	2,297	171	01C	57	[56.219663159899;-4.489978189657 NN457058]	Sim
1775	490	Scotland	1511	362	Slat Bheinn	700	267	2,297	876	10B	33	[57.067764905401;-5.4490974935664 NG910027]	Ma,G,Sim
1776	995	Scotland	1512	755	Creag Sgiathan	700	132	2,297	433	12A	25	[57.510212770296;-5.0598886652856 NH168508]	Hu,Sim
1777	1440	Scotland	1513	1108	Meall Buidhe	700	83	2,297	272	12A	25	[57.508075663701;-4.9611864743886 NH227503]	Sim
1778	1878	Scotland	1514	1464	Meall nan Ruadhag	700	57	2,297	187	09B	35	[57.126608439212;-4.4365598841884 NH526066]	Sim
1779	2167	Scotland	1515	1698	Cairn Leuchan	700	45	2,297	148	07B	44	[57.001463662304;-3.0239179467419 NO379905]	Sim
1780	575	Scotland	1516	429	Meall Fuar-mhonaidh	699	234	2,293	768	11B	26	[57.264337821112;-4.5600906523368 NH457222]	Ma,G,Sim
1781	2417	Scotland	1517	1904	Meall nan Aighean Beag	699	37	2,293	121	09B	34	[57.157080004169;-4.4865216986332 NH497101]	Sim
1782	1736	Scotland	1518	1351	Carn Leac Saighdeir	699	65	2,293	213	08B	37	[57.139074774774;-3.2078271113959 NJ270060]	Sim
1783	1605	Ireland	92	158	Camaderry Mountain	699	72	2,292	236	55A	56	[53.022080092065;-6.3897760901214 T081980]	Sim,Hew,Dil,A,VL
1784	129	Ireland	93	27	Birreencorragh	698	583	2,290	1,913	46B	23 31	[53.985138198735;-9.4885659956888 G024050]	Ma,Sim,Hew,Dil,A,VL
1785	1037	Scotland	1519	789	Garelet Dod	698	126	2,290	413	28B	78	[55.440847639903;-3.3830445208602 NT126172]	Hu,Sim,D
1786	1217	Scotland	1520	932	Black Law	698	103	2,290	338	28B	73	[55.538590394584;-3.2343462861025 NT222279]	Hu,Sim,D
1787	1837	Scotland	1521	1432	Meall Dubh	698	59	2,290	194	01A	52	[56.452926166285;-3.8447350866931 NN864305]	Sim
1788	999	Scotland	1522	758	Meall Cumhann	698	131	2,290	430	04A	41	[56.782165934668;-4.985586171024 NN177696]	Hu,Sim
1789	1968	Scotland	1523	1534	Druim Gleann Laoigh	698	53	2,290	174	10D	41	[56.918303348794;-5.1870987296248 NN061853]	Sim
1790	224	Wales	68	13	Mynydd Mawr	698	463	2,290	1,519	30B	115	[53.068601741672;-4.1820018816987 SH539546]	Ma,Sim,Hew,N
1791	552	Wales	69	35	Allt-Fawr	698	243	2,290	797	30B	115	[53.007615390722;-3.9672624006823 SH681474]	Ma,Sim,Hew,N
1792	629	Scotland	1524	473	Windy Standard	698	212	2,290	696	27C	77	[55.287328045855;-4.1745302845816 NS620014]	Ma,G,Sim,D
1793	2132	Ireland	94	193	Silsean	698	46	2,290	151	55B	56	[53.091483958795;-6.473764563276 O023056]	Sim,Hew,Dil,A,VL
1794	153	Scotland	1525	105	Creach-Beinn	698	551	2,290	1,808	17E	49	[56.381689558504;-5.8210957115664 NM642276]	Ma,G,Sim
1795	1135	Scotland	1526	868	Creagan nan Sgiath	697	112	2,287	367	01C	57	[56.296860262138;-4.4497417876867 NN485143]	Hu,Sim
1796	1218	Scotland	1527	933	Creag an Sgliata	697	103	2,287	338	01A	51 52	[56.534040285495;-4.0031662981338 NN769398]	Hu,Sim
1797	958	Scotland	1528	724	Teileasbhal	697	137	2,287	449	24B	13 14	[57.976997329139;-6.8648577660558 NB125090]	Hu,Sim
1798	663	Scotland	1529	498	Carn Loch nan Amhaichean	697	202	2,287	663	15B	20	[57.742809945769;-4.6711374309582 NH411757]	Ma,G,Sim
1799	924	Scotland	1530	699	Ceann Garbh Meallan Chuaich	697	142	2,287	466	14B	19	[57.678444194092;-5.1629860220239 NH115698]	Hu,Sim,sMa
1800	333	Scotland	1531	244	Queensberry	697	363	2,287	1,191	27C	78	[55.281021559269;-3.5931783076633 NX989997]	Ma,G,Sim,D
1801	1186	Scotland	1532	907	Meall an Araich	697	107	2,287	351	03C	50	[56.549580862168;-4.9005146715907 NN218435]	Hu,Sim
1802	1663	Scotland	1533	1291	Tarfessock	696	69	2,285	225	27B	77	[55.170542739362;-4.4995076094612 NX409891]	Sim,D
1803	1209	Scotland	1534	926	Chapelgill Hill	696	104	2,283	341	28B	72	[55.55742786045;-3.4806794912835 NT067303]	Hu,Sim,D
1804	2366	Scotland	1535	1863	Beinn Bheag West Top	696	38	2,283	125	18B	40	[56.715172908628;-5.4232639862666 NM906634]	Sim
1805	1141	England	107	84	Rest Dodd	696	111	2,283	364	34C	90	[54.514502354467;-2.8788713123391 NY432136]	Hu,Sim,Hew,N,W,B,Sy,Fel
1806	664	Ireland	95	84	Bencollaghduff	696	202	2,283	663	47B	37	[53.512507404074;-9.8141613749145 L797529]	Ma,Sim,Hew,Dil,A,VL
1807	1838	Scotland	1536	1433	Monawee	696	59	2,283	194	07B	44	[56.914719901204;-2.9739104710133 NO408808]	Sim
1808	1466	Scotland	1537	1133	Tom Breac	696	81	2,283	266	08B	36 44	[57.082605149848;-3.285186584133 NO222998]	Sim
1809	825	Scotland	1538	621	Beinn na Muice	695	159	2,280	522	12A	25	[57.417120829132;-4.9688259638589 NH218402]	Ma,G,Sim
1810	1250	Scotland	1539	955	Meall nan Aighean	695	100	2,280	328	16D	16	[58.228100393524;-4.24934774561 NC680288]	Hu,Sim
1811	1562	Scotland	1540	1213	Meallach Bheag	695	75	2,280	246	06A	35	[57.003615948124;-4.0266983830885 NN770921]	Sim
1812	2643	Scotland	1541	2092	An t-Sail	695	32	2,280	105	10B	33 40	[57.026072823213;-5.3957772431584 NM940979]	Sim
1813	1879	Wales	70	110	Mynydd Drws-y-coed	695	57	2,280	187	30B	115	[53.043695852337;-4.1673167103889 SH548518]	Sim,Hew,N
1814	1575	Scotland	1542	1225	Meaul	695	74	2,280	243	27B	77	[55.189547759443;-4.3577256395891 NX500909]	Sim,D
1815	1629	Scotland	1543	1266	Black Hill	695	71	2,280	233	07B	44	[56.865043635962;-2.8889657167147 NO459752]	Sim
1816	2503	Scotland	1544	1978	Meall na Caora East Top	694	35	2,277	115	01B	57	[56.303587749815;-4.236787368645 NN617146]	Sim
1817	421	England	108	23	Pen-y-ghent	694	306	2,277	1,004	35B	98	[54.155256641111;-2.2495543570671 SD838733]	Ma,Sim,Hew,N
1818	1317	Scotland	1545	1013	Meallan Odhar	694	93	2,277	305	12B	25	[57.377917629183;-4.9157373936469 NH248357]	Sim,sHu
1819	1530	Scotland	1546	1187	Leac nan Uan	694	77	2,277	253	09B	34	[57.031678906027;-4.6841586091275 NN372966]	Sim
1820	2587	Scotland	1547	2048	Creag na h-Iolaire	694	33	2,277	108	16D	16	[58.227890032311;-4.2612564895799 NC673288]	Sim
1821	116	Ireland	96	23	Keeper Hill	694	607	2,277	1,991	53B	59	[52.751443229708;-8.2628595721191 R823667]	Ma,Sim,Hew,Dil,A,VL
1822	285	Ireland	97	44	The Paps East	694	402	2,277	1,319	48C	79	[52.015261839967;-9.2635489728447 W133855]	Ma,Sim,Hew,Dil,A,VL
1823	1676	Scotland	1548	1302	Beinn an t-Sithein	694	68	2,277	223	01D	50 56	[56.332870785496;-4.9422928652883 NN182195]	Sim
1824	2418	Scotland	1549	1905	Camock Hill	694	37	2,277	121	08B	37	[57.125634983488;-3.2040857755258 NJ272045]	Sim
1825	1003	Scotland	1550	761	Maol Mor	693	130	2,275	428	01C	50 56	[56.272507893345;-4.6291012429965 NN373120]	Hu,Sim
1826	1396	Ireland	98	149	Ben Creggan	693	88	2,274	289	47A	37	[53.636878784362;-9.7287743455783 L857666]	Sim,Hew,Dil,A,VL
1827	1854	Scotland	1551	1447	Meall Daimh	693	58	2,274	190	01A	51	[56.449448569005;-4.1707107735487 NN663307]	Sim
1828	1987	Scotland	1552	1551	Carn Tuairneir	693	52	2,274	171	21A	36	[57.290470241299;-3.498173637196 NJ098232]	Sim
1829	2059	Scotland	1553	1612	Meall Mor	693	49	2,274	161	11A	25	[57.308840077542;-4.9102632758346 NH248280]	Sim
1830	2189	Scotland	1554	1717	Meall nan Dearcag	693	44	2,274	144	10C	34	[57.015775529154;-4.8741318059445 NN256953]	Sim
1831	1104	Scotland	1555	844	Balcnock	693	116	2,274	381	01E	56	[56.085189019538;-4.7288472438249 NS303914]	Hu,Sim
1832	1693	Scotland	1556	1316	Meall Beithe	693	67	2,274	220	03C	50	[56.471397483994;-4.9757446217175 NN168350]	Sim
1833	1969	Scotland	1557	1535	Tolm Buirich	693	53	2,274	174	08B	36	[57.191964931211;-3.3088409226053 NJ210120]	Sim
1834	1941	Scotland	1558	1511	Black Craig	692	54	2,270	177	01B	51 57	[56.362024642698;-4.185164971917 NN651210]	Sim
1835	2461	Scotland	1559	1942	Tom Liath	692	36	2,270	118	06A	43	[56.905222631283;-3.8226447645661 NN891808]	Sim
1836	311	Scotland	1560	231	Beinn a' Mhuinidh	692	383	2,270	1,257	14A	19	[57.640815466867;-5.2988285979098 NH032660]	Ma,G,Sim
1837	1142	Scotland	1561	873	Carn Feur-lochain	692	111	2,270	364	15B	20	[57.820655594085;-4.6870010794876 NH405844]	Hu,Sim
1838	1306	Scotland	1562	1004	Ladhar Bheinn North Top	692	94	2,270	308	10B	33	[57.090680100468;-5.5932471744484 NG824057]	Sim,sHu
1839	722	Scotland	1563	543	Mullwharchar	692	187	2,270	614	27B	77	[55.149525447875;-4.4275621856739 NX454866]	Ma,G,Sim,D
1840	339	Scotland	1564	247	Ettrick Pen	692	358	2,270	1,175	28B	79	[55.355857065054;-3.264931986594 NT199076]	Ma,G,Sim,D
1841	700	England	109	42	Seatallan	692	193	2,270	633	34B	89	[54.463663834433;-3.3282807011326 NY140084]	Ma,Sim,Hew,N,W,B,Sy,Fel
1842	2588	Ireland	99	217	Beann NE Top	692	33	2,270	108	50B	78	[51.93205599622;-9.8471519773065 V730771]	Sim,Hew,Dil,A,VL
1843	1189	Ireland	100	126	Caoinkeen	692	106	2,270	348	52A	85	[51.824534164421;-9.4366119613309 W010645]	Hu,Sim,Hew,Dil,A,VL
1844	1804	Scotland	1565	1406	Earn Skelly	692	61	2,270	200	07B	44	[56.838720870713;-2.9260408680952 NO436723]	Sim
1845	344	Scotland	1566	252	Beinn Tharsuinn	692	353	2,270	1,158	15B	21	[57.780702284238;-4.3459150375795 NH606792]	Ma,G,Sim
1846	1997	Ireland	101	187	Knockaterriff	692	51	2,269	168	53A	74	[52.346244700303;-8.2237690824768 R848216]	Sim,Hew,Dil,A,VL
1847	1058	Scotland	1567	808	Beinn Eagagach	691	123	2,268	403	02A	52	[56.686164476576;-3.8708226398436 NN855565]	Hu,Sim
1848	1767	Scotland	1568	1378	Talla Cleuch Head	691	63	2,267	207	28B	72	[55.482293476674;-3.373419315001 NT133218]	Sim,D
1849	1970	Scotland	1569	1536	Carn na Ruabraich	691	53	2,267	174	08B	36	[57.178822135381;-3.4423693695528 NJ129107]	Sim
1850	1175	Scotland	1570	897	Na h-Uamhachan	691	108	2,267	354	10D	40	[56.904365585556;-5.3419920470225 NM966842]	Hu,Sim
1851	2133	Scotland	1571	1670	Meall Meadhonach West Top	691	46	2,267	151	16F	15	[58.11174416082;-5.1231959877429 NC161179]	Sim
1852	576	Ireland	102	75	Binn Bhraoin	691	234	2,267	768	47B	37	[53.499613258108;-9.8347103614847 L783515]	Ma,Sim,Hew,Dil,A,VL
1853	1288	Scotland	1572	987	West Knock	691	96	2,267	315	07B	44	[56.868809289541;-2.8644489551889 NO474756]	Sim,sHu
1854	1845	Wales	71	107	Foel Wen	691	59	2,266	193	30E	125	[52.890475019135;-3.3406162470078 SJ099334]	Sim,Hew,N
1855	2521	Scotland	1573	1993	Meall nan Tarmachan West Top	690	35	2,265	114	01C	50 56	[56.329255076451;-4.6653594390638 NN353184]	Sim
1856	778	Scotland	1574	584	Meall Dearg	690	172	2,265	565	01A	52	[56.551327395843;-3.8137289984722 NN886414]	Ma,G,Sim
1857	1153	Scotland	1575	880	Dun Mor	690	110	2,264	360	06A	43	[56.893466152069;-3.7005844321555 NN965793]	Hu,Sim
1858	1331	Scotland	1576	1023	Erie Hill	690	92	2,264	302	28B	78	[55.454286156601;-3.3866774277009 NT124187]	Sim,D,sHu
1859	1503	Wales	72	85	Twmpa	690	79	2,264	259	32A	161	[52.007986769404;-3.1319589507329 SO224350]	Sim,Hew,N
1860	1000	Scotland	1577	759	Beinn Dubhcharaidh	690	131	2,264	430	09B	35	[57.247929277607;-4.3417851299666 NH588199]	Hu,Sim
1861	1563	Scotland	1578	1214	Eagan	690	75	2,264	246	12A	25	[57.451930102522;-5.303462190671 NH019450]	Sim
1862	1942	Scotland	1579	1512	Sgurr a' Gharg Gharaidh	690	54	2,264	177	10A	33	[57.182766287823;-5.4515408940514 NG915155]	Sim
1863	925	England	110	63	Great Calva	690	142	2,264	466	34A	89 90	[54.669948528841;-3.1024105231863 NY290311]	Hu,Sim,Hew,N,sMa,W,B,Sy,Fel
1864	140	Ireland	103	31	Knocknadobar	690	565	2,264	1,854	50A	83	[51.992955433539;-10.175802673675 V506845]	Ma,Sim,Hew,Dil,A,VL
1865	1190	Ireland	104	127	The Paps West	690	106	2,264	348	48C	79	[52.015136344582;-9.2751982062952 W125855]	Hu,Sim,Hew,Dil,A,VL
1866	866	Scotland	1580	653	Beinn Molurgainn	690	151	2,264	495	03B	50	[56.510218272502;-5.221024159117 NN019400]	Ma,G,Sim
1867	1916	Scotland	1581	1493	Stob Gaibhre	690	55	2,264	180	03B	50	[56.571254159834;-5.1545651446854 NN063466]	Sim
1868	1219	Scotland	1582	934	Carn nan Sgliat	690	103	2,264	338	07A	43	[56.995428337659;-3.3727136146987 NO167902]	Hu,Sim
1869	2606	Scotland	1583	2062	Gearr Aonach	690	33	2,263	108	03B	41	[56.65691500252;-4.9985176947514 NN163557]	Sim
1870	2279	Scotland	1584	1790	Sgurr an Fheadain	689	41	2,261	133	17B	32	[57.24002515948;-6.2247034127286 NG452245]	Sim
1871	657	Scotland	1585	494	Ballencleuch Law	689	204	2,260	669	27C	78	[55.326588516679;-3.680125163774 NS935049]	Ma,G,Sim,D
1872	1241	Scotland	1586	949	Meall Dubh na Caoidhe	689	101	2,260	331	12A	25	[57.444439388514;-5.0293847044356 NH183434]	Hu,Sim
1873	2462	Scotland	1587	1943	Dunan Liath	689	36	2,260	118	15B	20	[57.824422418866;-4.6788600539711 NH410848]	Sim
1874	2504	Scotland	1588	1979	Sithean Dubh	689	35	2,260	115	09B	35	[57.10766482681;-4.4402701558099 NH523045]	Sim
1875	446	Wales	73	27	Arenig Fach	689	294	2,260	965	30D	124 125	[52.957850477098;-3.7580581136739 SH820415]	Ma,Sim,Hew,N
1876	1210	Wales	74	69	Cnicht	689	104	2,260	341	30B	115	[52.999529040129;-4.02054438504 SH645466]	Hu,Sim,Hew,N
1877	1432	Wales	75	80	Foel Hafod-fynydd	689	84	2,260	276	30E	124 125	[52.79014713622;-3.6667541300649 SH877227]	Sim,Hew,N
1878	861	Scotland	1589	650	Beinn Direach	689	152	2,260	499	16B	16	[58.301574245949;-4.7216805772993 NC406380]	Ma,G,Sim
1879	67	Ireland	105	10	Croaghaun	688	688	2,257	2,257	46C	22 30	[53.983252348999;-10.197406675289 F559060]	Ma,Sim,Hew,Dil,A,VL
1880	553	Scotland	1590	412	Stob Breac	688	243	2,257	797	01C	57	[56.316274811079;-4.5124372378766 NN447166]	Ma,G,Sim
1881	2238	Scotland	1591	1756	Rodger Law	688	42	2,257	138	27C	71 78	[55.334887885923;-3.664710304365 NS945058]	Sim,DT
1882	638	Scotland	1592	482	Gathersnow Hill	688	210	2,257	689	28B	72	[55.515037852162;-3.4933409246287 NT058256]	Ma,G,Sim,D
1883	917	Scotland	1593	693	Carn na Farraidh	688	143	2,257	469	08B	36	[57.214454552331;-3.4685973808934 NJ114147]	Hu,Sim,sMa
1884	1450	Scotland	1594	1118	Meall a' Bhraghaid	688	82	2,257	269	16E	15	[58.084035947031;-4.8883194691682 NC298142]	Sim
1885	2463	Scotland	1595	1944	A' Chraidhleag	688	36	2,257	118	09B	34	[57.113144717607;-4.5265216322216 NH471053]	Sim
1886	1050	Scotland	1596	800	Loch Fell	688	124	2,257	407	28B	79	[55.329323601869;-3.3097991197474 NT170047]	Hu,Sim,D
1887	1231	Scotland	1597	940	Craigie Thieves	688	102	2,257	334	07A	44	[56.815316805375;-3.2416189622189 NO243700]	Hu,Sim
1888	1292	Scotland	1598	991	Mudlee Bracks	688	95	2,257	312	07B	44	[56.959028601231;-2.8073401390761 NO510856]	Sim,sHu
1889	1606	Ireland	106	159	Ben Creggan South Top	687	72	2,254	236	47A	37	[53.632410362314;-9.727079852127 L858661]	Sim,Hew,Dil,A,VL
1890	1289	Scotland	1599	988	Cadhachan Riabhach	687	96	2,254	315	14A	19	[57.756419728674;-5.3463601841602 NH010790]	Sim,sHu
1891	2505	Scotland	1600	1980	Sail Gharbh Far West Top	687	35	2,254	115	16E	15	[58.213715680073;-5.0691427676733 NC198291]	Sim
1892	2687	Scotland	1601	2132	Craiggowrie	687	31	2,254	102	08A	36	[57.199587663542;-3.7196025229279 NH962134]	Sim
1893	2688	Scotland	1602	2133	Meall a' Chuilinn South Top	687	31	2,254	102	18B	40	[56.69566630324;-5.4460005760212 NM891613]	Sim
1894	607	England	111	36	Great Coum	687	221	2,254	725	35B	98	[54.246300888069;-2.4618790578574 SD700835]	Ma,Sim,Hew,N
1895	1278	Ireland	107	138	Slieve Meelmore	687	97	2,254	318	43B	29	[54.190659497472;-5.9999447305106 J306287]	Sim,Hew,Dil,A,VL,sHu
1896	2168	Scotland	1603	1699	Craig Maskeldie	687	45	2,254	148	07B	44	[56.904619062075;-3.0015614534248 NO391797]	Sim
1897	2211	Scotland	1604	1736	Cairn of Meadows	687	43	2,254	141	07B	44	[56.862062573345;-2.9282578419244 NO435749]	Sim
1898	1232	Scotland	1605	941	Sgurr na Bana Mhoraire	687	102	2,253	334	13B	24	[57.513320849104;-5.5579073109551 NG870526]	Hu,Sim
1899	1721	Scotland	1606	1339	Manywee	686	66	2,251	215	07B	44	[56.810320565627;-2.9974063816092 NO392692]	Sim
1900	1821	Scotland	1607	1419	Meall Odhar	686	60	2,251	197	06B	43	[56.775374418503;-3.4464899825951 NO117658]	Sim
1901	1038	Scotland	1608	790	Beinn Dearg	686	126	2,251	413	14B	20	[57.673430178133;-4.8840841646065 NH281685]	Hu,Sim
1902	1096	Scotland	1609	836	Leaba Bhruic	686	117	2,251	384	15B	20	[57.81439679951;-4.6427558418335 NH431836]	Hu,Sim
1903	1839	Scotland	1610	1434	Meall Coire an t-Searraich	686	59	2,251	194	10B	33	[57.087731073598;-5.6639692677353 NG781056]	Sim
1904	2007	Scotland	1611	1569	Sgurr na Cairbe	686	51	2,251	167	12A	26	[57.476072888899;-4.8284635886387 NH305464]	Sim
1905	2060	Scotland	1612	1613	Creag Ghlas	686	49	2,251	161	12A	25	[57.548286499775;-4.9326887722535 NH246547]	Sim
1906	1630	England	112	109	Round Hill	686	71	2,251	233	35A	91	[54.719241776348;-2.3989362966985 NY744361]	Sim,Hew,N
1907	1657	Ireland	108	164	War Hill	686	69	2,251	226	55B	56	[53.139682764425;-6.2538688830166 O169113]	Sim,Hew,Dil,A,VL
1908	2265	Scotland	1613	1779	Meall Breac	685	41	2,248	135	05A	42	[56.797909483329;-4.1826258358077 NN668695]	Sim
1909	2330	Scotland	1614	1829	Creagan an Lochain	685	39	2,247	128	01B	51 57	[56.359188493035;-4.1930968628085 NN646207]	Sim
1910	1880	Scotland	1615	1465	Carn Coire Dhealanaich	685	57	2,247	187	09B	35	[57.24339809328;-4.1426027332689 NH708190]	Sim
1911	2367	Scotland	1616	1864	Sgurr a' Gharg Gharaidh North Top	685	38	2,247	125	10A	33	[57.184468659875;-5.4550108877848 NG913157]	Sim
1912	2212	Wales	76	129	Gwaun y Llwyni	685	43	2,247	141	30E	124 125	[52.769060100441;-3.6955946505664 SH857204]	Sim,Hew,N
1913	289	Ireland	109	45	Hungry Hill	685	400	2,247	1,312	51A	84	[51.686600380101;-9.793761139564 V760497]	Ma,Sim,Hew,Dil,A,VL
1914	1631	Wales	77	95	Pen y Brynfforchog	685	71	2,247	233	30E	124 125	[52.745734738771;-3.7539498995126 SH817179]	Sim,Hew,N
1915	1176	Scotland	1617	898	Stob an Lochain	684	108	2,244	354	01C	57	[56.212741292039;-4.4766269031901 NN465050]	Hu,Sim
1916	2008	Scotland	1618	1570	Laird's Cleuch Rig	684	51	2,244	167	28B	78	[55.462370712564;-3.3869611993166 NT124196]	Sim,DT
1917	790	Scotland	1619	594	Leana Mhor	684	169	2,244	554	09C	34 41	[56.949532743019;-4.8229768003618 NN284878]	Ma,G,Sim
1918	1293	Scotland	1620	992	Meall a' Mhadaidh	684	95	2,244	312	12B	26	[57.391701920673;-4.8236211419773 NH304370]	Sim,sHu
1919	1632	Scotland	1621	1267	Meall Daimh	684	71	2,244	233	14A	19	[57.674409183047;-5.3203374879485 NH021698]	Sim
1920	2009	Scotland	1622	1571	Meallan Liath Mor	684	51	2,244	167	16B	16	[58.255820780877;-4.718170294323 NC406329]	Sim
1921	793	Ireland	110	97	Knockmoyle	684	168	2,244	551	50B	78 83	[51.910775609192;-9.9407444850063 V665749]	Ma,Sim,Hew,Dil,A,VL
1922	1899	Wales	78	114	Y Garn	684	56	2,244	184	31A	135	[52.450081055546;-3.8039835695501 SN775851]	Sim,Hew,N
1923	611	Scotland	1623	459	Beinn Damhain	684	220	2,244	722	01D	50 56	[56.315964762461;-4.7792583429369 NN282172]	Ma,G,Sim
1924	791	Scotland	1624	595	Cruach an t-Sidhein	684	169	2,244	554	01E	56	[56.129056677996;-4.7770187643668 NS275964]	Ma,G,Sim
1925	2464	Scotland	1625	1945	Coire Breac Top	684	36	2,244	118	07B	44	[56.948294362491;-3.0438307094046 NO366846]	Sim
1926	2096	Scotland	1626	1638	Creag Grianain	683	47	2,242	155	01A	52	[56.493694724651;-3.8824519447624 NN842351]	Sim
1927	1225	Scotland	1627	937	Carn na Bruar	683	102	2,241	335	21A	37	[57.315416093054;-3.1803994778077 NJ290256]	Hu,Sim
1928	2419	England	113	168	Bannerdale Crags	683	37	2,241	121	34A	90	[54.651694443104;-3.0321700908401 NY335290]	Sim,Hew,N,W,B,Sy,Fel
1929	2689	Scotland	1628	2134	Craig Maskeldie South Top	683	31	2,241	102	07B	44	[56.899229868507;-3.0014171790467 NO391791]	Sim
1930	1434	Scotland	1629	1102	Beinn Chas	683	84	2,240	274	01D	50 56	[56.30297549672;-4.9141236833093 NN198161]	Sim
1931	2061	Ireland	111	191	Tomaneena	682	49	2,239	161	55A	56	[53.024256475625;-6.4180131580482 T062982]	Sim,Hew,Dil,A,VL
1932	114	Ireland	112	22	Maumtrasna	682	608	2,238	1,995	47C	38	[53.612999730537;-9.5706437526626 L961637]	Ma,Sim,Hew,Dil,A,VL
1933	1111	Scotland	1630	851	Ruadh Mheall	682	115	2,238	377	01A	51	[56.456099882964;-4.1499919083127 NN676314]	Hu,Sim
1934	1900	Scotland	1631	1479	Tullich Hill	682	56	2,238	184	01A	51 52	[56.503563331937;-4.1071793463292 NN704366]	Sim
1935	776	Scotland	1632	582	Beinn a' Chaisgein Beag	682	173	2,238	568	14A	19	[57.782241804055;-5.422794908874 NG966821]	Ma,G,Sim
1936	1694	Scotland	1633	1317	Beinn Acha' Bhraghad	682	67	2,238	220	09B	26 35	[57.285014138054;-4.229646026845 NH657238]	Sim
1937	2213	Scotland	1634	1737	Sgurr a' Gharg Gharaidh Far South Top	682	43	2,238	141	10A	33	[57.177522530146;-5.4460858164139 NG918149]	Sim
1938	1633	Ireland	113	161	Carrigvore	682	71	2,238	233	55B	56	[53.129914144803;-6.3244881828825 O122101]	Sim,Hew,Dil,A,VL
1939	2420	Scotland	1635	1906	Cairn Lick	682	37	2,238	121	07B	44	[56.891159210041;-2.9995598020883 NO392782]	Sim
1940	1855	Ireland	114	176	Corranabinnia SW Top	681	58	2,234	190	46B	30	[53.961033171278;-9.6812114431354 F897026]	Sim,Hew,Dil,A,VL
1941	1014	Scotland	1636	768	Meall nan Saighdearan	681	129	2,234	423	01B	51 57	[56.364414546125;-4.1513016249626 NN672212]	Hu,Sim
1942	438	Scotland	1637	324	Meall Onfhaidh	681	299	2,234	981	10D	41	[56.904481628173;-5.2697104382467 NN010840]	Ma,G,Sim
1943	479	Scotland	1638	352	Meall na Faochaig	681	273	2,234	896	12A	25	[57.528975973675;-4.9127582700441 NH257525]	Ma,G,Sim
1944	2589	Scotland	1639	2049	Carn Dearg	681	33	2,234	108	10C	34	[57.118738918598;-4.9300230727338 NH227069]	Sim
1945	883	Scotland	1640	665	Blacklorg Hill	681	148	2,234	486	27C	77	[55.313384708094;-4.1239514592041 NS653042]	Hu,Sim,D,sMa
1946	1551	England	114	102	Swarth Fell	681	76	2,234	249	35A	98	[54.364324541745;-2.3785579518726 SD755966]	Sim,Hew,N
1947	329	Ireland	115	51	Caherbarnagh	681	364	2,234	1,194	48C	79	[52.030513404368;-9.17946755193 W191871]	Ma,Sim,Hew,Dil,A,VL
1948	1917	Scotland	1641	1494	Mullachdubh	681	55	2,234	180	21A	37	[57.137639968996;-3.0689839973254 NJ354057]	Sim
1949	169	Scotland	1642	117	Beinn Bhreac	681	524	2,233	1,719	01E	56	[56.16300530171;-4.7053716998549 NN321000]	Ma,G,Sim
1950	2223	Scotland	1643	1743	Meall Chrombaig	680	42	2,232	138	06B	43	[56.906956838548;-3.6322218990906 NO007807]	Sim
1951	1943	Scotland	1644	1513	Frith-mheallan	680	54	2,231	177	14A	19	[57.772966875034;-5.4000453796098 NG979810]	Sim
1952	2062	Scotland	1645	1614	An Soutar	680	49	2,231	161	12B	25	[57.372059840333;-4.8969723624471 NH259350]	Sim
1953	2266	Scotland	1646	1780	Sgurr a' Gharg Gharaidh Far North Top	680	41	2,231	135	10A	33	[57.187022030349;-5.4602164761499 NG910160]	Sim
1954	2331	Scotland	1647	1830	Sgurr a' Gharg Gharaidh South Top	680	39	2,231	128	10A	33	[57.179270478101;-5.447904001586 NG917151]	Sim
1955	2134	Scotland	1648	1671	The Ca	680	46	2,231	151	08B	37	[57.132961697822;-3.1894543973847 NJ281053]	Sim
1956	1840	England	115	124	Plover Hill	680	59	2,231	194	35B	98	[54.172366331086;-2.2328070032947 SD849752]	Sim,Hew,N
1957	2174	Wales	79	128	Mynydd Tarw	679	44	2,229	145	30E	125	[52.88170458738;-3.3210264782485 SJ112324]	Sim,Hew,N
1958	1988	Scotland	1649	1552	Creag a' Mhadaidh	679	52	2,229	171	02A	52	[56.664944010978;-3.9073024869336 NN832542]	Sim
1959	127	Scotland	1650	88	Tiorga Mor	679	588	2,228	1,929	24B	13 14	[57.994791418818;-6.9858731221152 NB055115]	Ma,G,Sim
1960	1607	Wales	80	94	Chwarel y Fan	679	72	2,228	236	32A	161	[51.958113349322;-3.0812212521947 SO258294]	Sim,Hew,N,CoH,CoU,CoA
1961	730	Scotland	1651	549	Meall a' Chrathaich	679	184	2,228	604	11B	26	[57.25916647404;-4.7205936080296 NH360220]	Ma,G,Sim
1962	759	Scotland	1652	568	Carn na Breabaig	679	177	2,228	581	12B	25	[57.320326460679;-5.2135432786774 NH066301]	Ma,G,Sim
1963	959	Scotland	1653	725	Meall nam Bradhan	679	137	2,228	449	15A	20	[57.867552746935;-4.9232204116901 NH267902]	Hu,Sim
1964	1750	Scotland	1654	1363	Carn Dearg Beag	679	64	2,228	210	09B	34	[57.008998166534;-4.6940542235226 NN365941]	Sim
1965	898	Ireland	116	105	Colly	679	146	2,228	479	50A	78 83	[51.962509132288;-9.9648033270686 V650807]	Hu,Sim,Hew,Dil,A,VL,sMa
1966	2644	Scotland	1655	2093	Beinn Mhic-Mhonaidh East Top	679	32	2,228	105	03C	50	[56.477952582407;-4.888547648431 NN222355]	Sim
1967	389	Wales	81	22	Maesglase	679	318	2,226	1,044	30F	124 125	[52.719677202505;-3.7529039727615 SH817150]	Ma,Sim,Hew,N
1968	298	Scotland	1656	221	Carn Breac	678	392	2,224	1,286	13B	25	[57.524800745364;-5.266614017988 NH045530]	Ma,G,Sim
1969	763	Scotland	1657	572	Carn Mhic an Toisich	678	176	2,224	577	11B	34	[57.22594343289;-4.8009928245801 NH310185]	Ma,G,Sim
1970	1226	Scotland	1658	938	Meall an Aodainn	678	102	2,224	335	03B	41	[56.624877918874;-5.131319287095 NN080525]	Hu,Sim
1971	2239	Scotland	1659	1757	Feith a' Ghiubhais	678	42	2,224	138	11A	25	[57.322885984781;-4.9246655865753 NH240296]	Sim
1972	826	Scotland	1660	622	Capel Fell	678	159	2,224	522	28B	79	[55.348968002988;-3.3214872008662 NT163069]	Ma,G,Sim,D
1973	493	England	116	29	Baugh Fell - Tarn Rigg Hill	678	265	2,224	869	35A	98	[54.319315315354;-2.4012041276881 SD740916]	Ma,Sim,Hew,N
1974	1989	Ireland	117	186	Knocksheegowna	678	52	2,224	171	54A	75	[52.299927702484;-7.5946917321356 S277165]	Sim,Hew,Dil,A,VL
1975	134	Ireland	118	30	Sawel	678	580	2,224	1,903	44B	13	[54.819727645049;-7.0409169257154 H617973]	Ma,Sim,Hew,Dil,A,VL,CoH,CoU
1976	2042	Ireland	119	190	Slieve Binnian North Top	678	50	2,224	164	43B	29	[54.151772395126;-5.9849823675689 J317244]	Sim,Hew,Dil,A,VL
1977	290	Ireland	120	46	Slieve Snaght	678	400	2,224	1,312	45B	01	[54.980655858828;-8.1210131815505 B923148]	Ma,Sim,Hew,Dil,A,VL
1978	503	Wales	82	32	Creigiau Gleision	678	262	2,224	860	30B	115	[53.135429273771;-3.902835763351 SH728615]	Ma,Sim,Hew,N
1979	410	Scotland	1661	303	Hill of Wirren	678	311	2,224	1,020	07B	44	[56.854059062014;-2.785400488959 NO522739]	Ma,G,Sim
1980	2690	Scotland	1662	2135	Meall Odhar Mor	678	31	2,223	102	02A	42 51 52	[56.664825403951;-3.9725697229967 NN792543]	Sim
1981	692	Scotland	1663	522	Andrewhinney Hill	677	194	2,222	636	28B	79	[55.411521328676;-3.2698694839307 NT197138]	Ma,G,Sim,D
1982	2479	Scotland	1664	1956	Bodnasparet	677	36	2,222	117	07A	44	[56.809597850307;-3.2741878593788 NO223694]	Sim
1983	693	Scotland	1665	523	Carn Gorm	677	194	2,222	636	12B	26	[57.37913221361;-4.7827210999604 NH328355]	Ma,G,Sim
1984	1200	Scotland	1666	919	Dun Law	677	105	2,221	344	27C	71 78	[55.404313023094;-3.7134306301255 NS916136]	Hu,Sim,D
1985	1125	Scotland	1667	864	Creag a' Chinn Duibh	677	113	2,221	371	13A	19 24	[57.604243927801;-5.5852177151173 NG859628]	Hu,Sim
1986	1397	Scotland	1668	1076	Meall Reamhar	676	88	2,219	289	01C	51	[56.373115706548;-4.4109076943707 NN512227]	Sim
1987	1695	Scotland	1669	1318	Stob Law	676	67	2,218	220	28B	73	[55.586328791543;-3.2231518435415 NT230332]	Sim,D
1988	427	Scotland	1670	316	Meall Mor	676	304	2,218	997	03B	41	[56.656436597365;-5.0915042890326 NN106559]	Ma,G,Sim
1989	832	Scotland	1671	627	Leana Mhor	676	158	2,218	518	09C	34 41	[56.9516058066;-4.7705013007182 NN316879]	Ma,G,Sim
1990	1307	Scotland	1672	1005	Meall na Speireig	676	94	2,218	308	14B	20	[57.684954972856;-4.851441707927 NH301697]	Sim,sHu
1991	2368	Scotland	1673	1865	Beinn na h-Eaglaise South Top	676	38	2,218	125	13B	25	[57.506884080445;-5.4988232731795 NG905517]	Sim
1992	1805	Wales	83	104	Moel Druman	676	61	2,218	200	30B	115	[53.009164706684;-3.982238862686 SH671476]	Sim,Hew,N
1993	1608	Scotland	1674	1247	Larg Hill	676	72	2,218	236	27B	77	[55.049825195318;-4.4684931633311 NX424756]	Sim,D
1994	312	England	117	15	The Calf	676	383	2,218	1,257	35A	98	[54.367418302019;-2.5140288364544 SD667970]	Ma,Sim,Hew,N
1995	1227	Ireland	121	130	Knocknagantee	676	102	2,218	335	50B	78 83	[51.892859367155;-9.9370669666886 V667729]	Hu,Sim,Hew,Dil,A,VL
1996	468	Scotland	1675	344	Beinn Suidhe	676	280	2,218	919	03C	50	[56.517911761187;-4.9094748016459 NN211400]	Ma,G,Sim
1997	1379	Scotland	1676	1062	Meall nan Ceapairean	676	89	2,217	292	13B	25	[57.480557095502;-5.4428965323198 NG937486]	Sim
1998	2526	England	118	174	Calders	675	34	2,216	112	35A	98	[54.358451133539;-2.5093004654914 SD670960]	Sim,Hew,N
1999	2421	Scotland	1677	1907	Cardon Hill	675	37	2,215	121	28B	72	[55.567270051579;-3.4842215576496 NT065314]	Sim,DT
2000	1696	Scotland	1678	1319	Meall Breac	675	67	2,215	220	06B	43	[56.798327982512;-3.6929988506989 NN967687]	Sim

== DoBIH codes ==
The DoBIH uses the following codes for the various classifications of mountains and hills in the British Isles, which many of the above peaks also fall into:

- Ma Marilyn
- Hu HuMP
- Sim Simm
- 5 Dodd
- M Munro
- MT Munro Top
- F Furth
- C Corbett
- G Graham
- D Donald
- DT Donald Top
- Hew Hewitt
- N Nuttall
- Dew Dewey
- DDew Donald Dewey
- HF Highland Five
- 4 400-499m Tump
- 3 300-399m Tump (GB)
- 2 200-299m Tump (GB)
- 1 100-199m Tump (GB)
- 0 0-99m Tump (GB)
- W Wainwright
- WO Wainwright Outlying Fell
- B Birkett
- Sy Synge
- Fel Fellranger
- CoH County Top – Historic (pre-1974)
- CoA County Top – Administrative (1974 to mid-1990s)
- CoU County Top – Current County or Unitary Authority
- CoL County Top – Current London Borough
- SIB Significant Island of Britain
- Dil Dillon
- A Arderin
- VL Vandeleur-Lynam
- O Other list (which includes):
  - Bin Binnion
  - Bg Bridge
  - BL Buxton & Lewis
  - Ca Carn
  - CT Corbett Top
  - GT Graham Top
  - Mur Murdo
  - P500 P500
  - P600 P600
- Un unclassified

prefixes:
- s sub
- x deleted

suffixes:
= twin

== People who have climbed all hills in a group ==
As of 31 December 2023, 7,654 people had climbed all 282 Scottish Munros; as of April 2020 eleven people had climbed all 1556 Marilyns of Great Britain; (Note: Does include the IOM, but does not include the 454 Marilyns on the Island of Ireland) while as of December 2024 only six people had climbed all the 2532 Simms of Great Britain: (Note: Does not include IOM or Ireland) Ken Whyte (Cruachan Beag 21/09/2010), Iain Thow (Cut Hill 07/06/2015), Michael Earnshaw (Cruach Fhiarach 16/07/2019), Rob Woodall (Sgurr Dhonuill West Top 28/06/2021), Anne Bunn (Torr Ceum na Caillich, 24/09/2022) and Callum Gray (Sgurr Dubh, 21/12/2024). The first three have also climbed the Irish Simms, so including all the Simms of the British Isles.

== See also ==
- Lists of mountains and hills in the British Isles
- Lists of mountains in Ireland
- List of Munro mountains
- List of Murdo mountains
- List of Furth mountains in the British Isles
- List of Marilyns in the British Isles
- List of P600 mountains in the British Isles
