= Birkscairn Hill =

Hill in Scottish Borders, Scotland

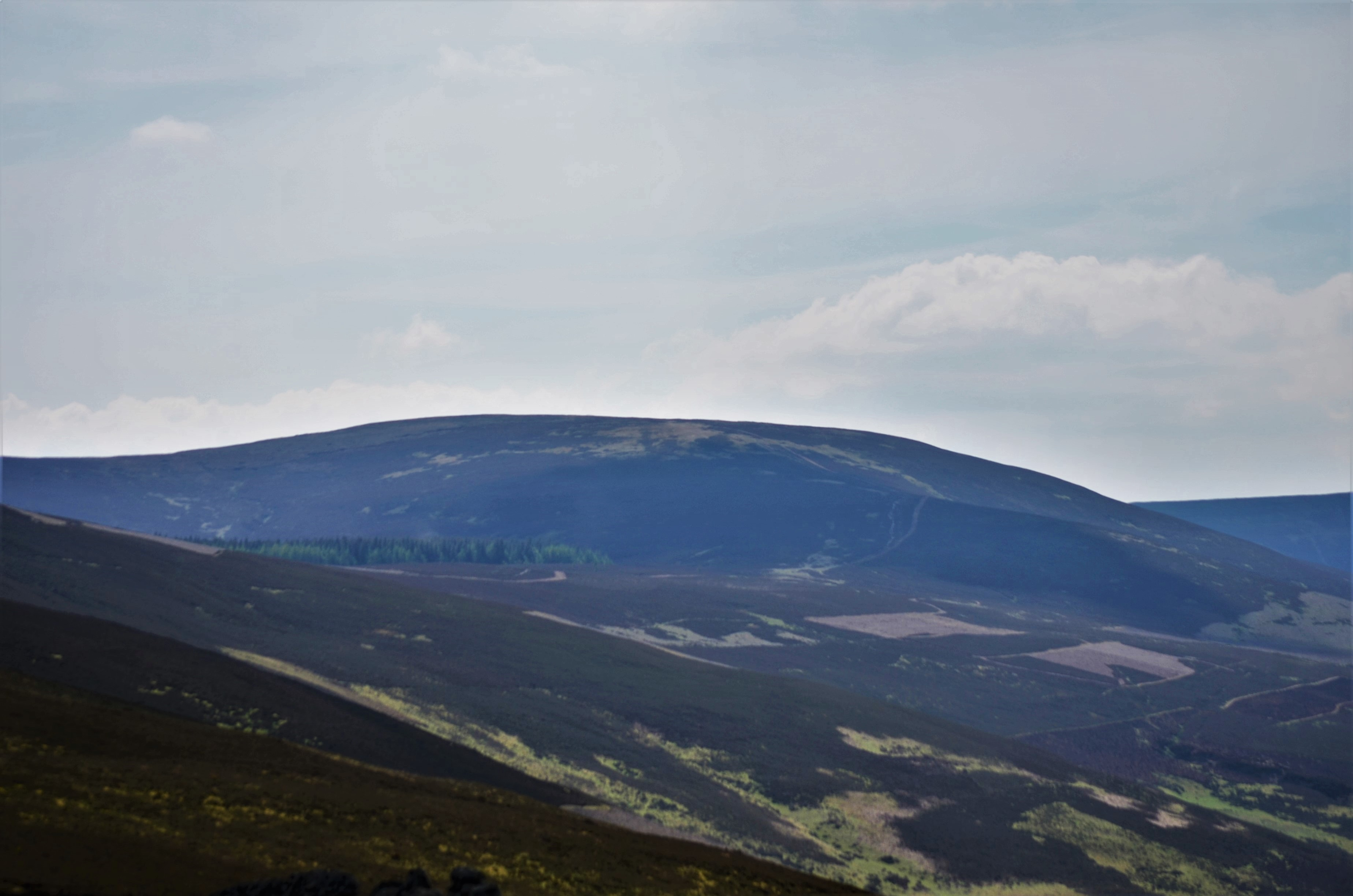

Highest point
- Elevation: 661 m (2,169 ft)
- Prominence: 62 m (203 ft)
- Listing: Tu,Sim,D,GT,DN

Geography
- Location: Scottish Borders, Scotland
- Parent range: Manor Hills, Southern Uplands
- OS grid: NT 27470 33163
- Topo map: OS Landranger 73

Birkscairn Hill is a hill in the Manor Hills range, part of the Southern Uplands of Scotland. It is the lowest, and normally first, Donald in a round of hills known as the Dun Rig Horseshoe, south of Peebles.
