= Drumelzier Law =

Hill in the Southern Uplands of Scotland

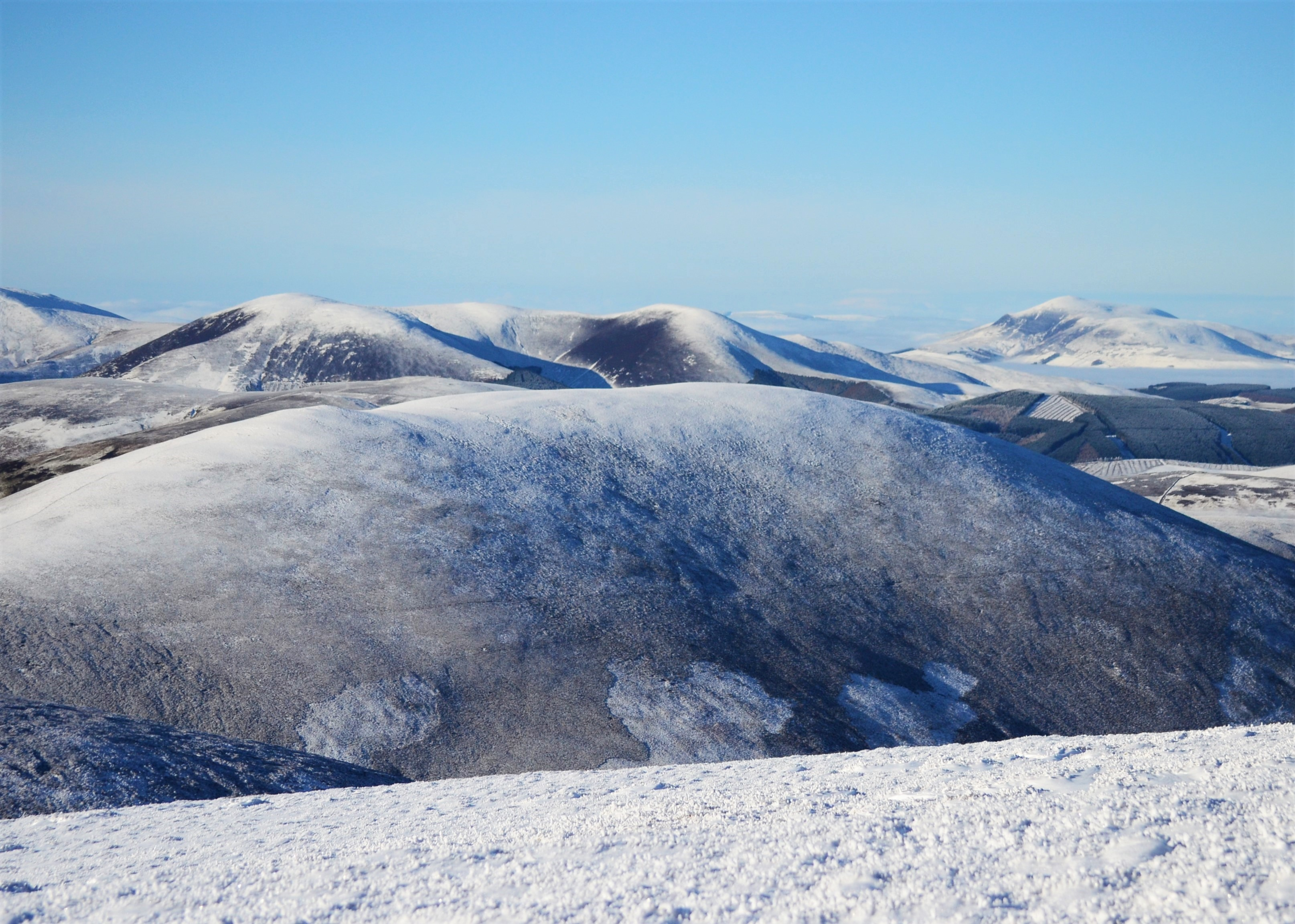

Highest point
- Elevation: 668 m (2,192 ft)
- Prominence: 95 m (312 ft)
- Listing: Tu,Sim,D,sHu,GT,DN

Geography
- Location: Scottish Borders, Scotland
- Parent range: Manor Hills, Southern Uplands
- OS grid: NT 14925 31242
- Topo map: OS Landranger 72

Drumelzier Law is a hill in the Manor Hills range, part of the Southern Uplands of Scotland. It is often ascended from Drumelzier itself or Stanhope farm to the west, but ascents from the Manor Valley to the east are also common.
