= Manor Hills =

Range of hills in the Scottish Borders

Coordinates: 55°34′36″N 3°11′46″W

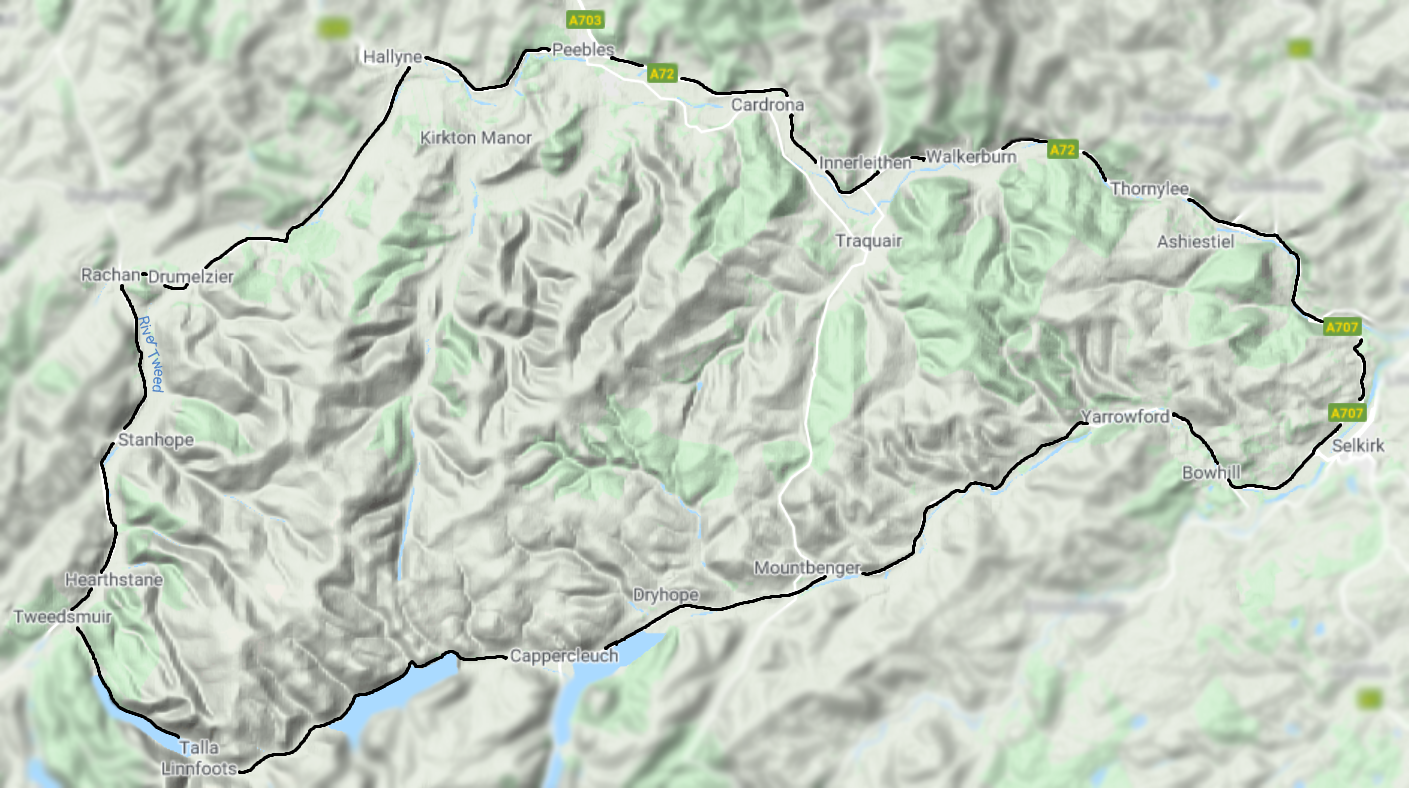
Google Maps terrain map showing a broad outline of the range.

The Manor Hills, also known as the Tweedsmuir Hills, are a range of hills south of Peebles in the Scottish Borders, one of the ranges which collectively form the Southern Uplands. They are separated from the Moffat Hills by the Talla Reservoir, Megget Reservoir and St. Mary's Loch, the Moorfoot Hills by the A72 and the Culter Hills in South Lanarkshire by the A701. The western portion of the hills are designated as the 'Tweedsmuir Hills' Site of Special Scientific Interest and the 'Upper Tweeddale' National Scenic Area, with the major tributary rivers designated as Special Areas of Conservation.

== The Hills ==
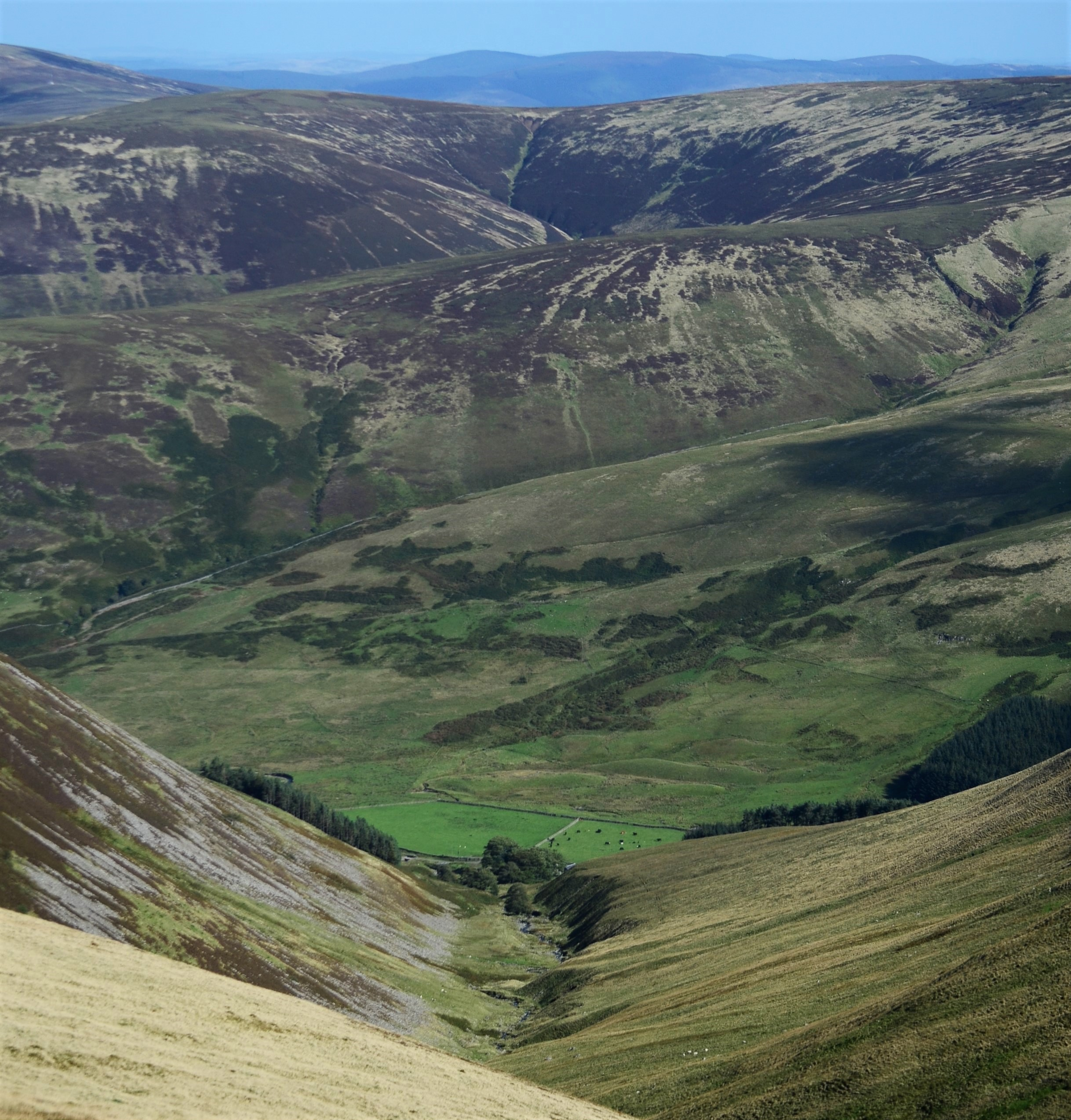
From Fifescar Knowe looking down Ugly Grain, across the Manor Valley to Blackhouse Heights. Minch Moor in the background.

A broad area, the higher hills could be said to generally split into three sections: those directly south of Peebles, those north of the Megget Reservoir and those southeast of Drumelzier. There is, however, a section of lower hills east of the B709 road as well as some isolated hills throughout. The highest point of the range is Broad Law, which is also the highest point in the historic county of Peeblesshire. The hills contain five Marilyns and thirteen Donalds, of which there is one Graham and one Corbett.

In a roughly clockwise direction, the hills in the range over 2,000 feet (609.6 metres) (excluding tops) are as follows:

Summit	Height (m)	Listing
Stob Law	676	Tu,Sim, D,GT,DN
Glenrath Heights	732	Tu,Sim, D,GT,DN
Dun Rig	744	Ma,Hu,Tu,Sim, G, D,DN,Y
Birkscairn Hill	661	Tu,Sim, D,GT,DN
Black Law	698	Hu,Tu,Sim, D,GT,DN,Y
Greenside Law	643	Tu,Sim, D,GT,DN
Dollar Law	817	Tu,Sim, D,CT,DN
Cramalt Craig	830	Hu,Tu,Sim, D,sMa,CT,DN,Y,xC
Broad Law	840	Ma,Hu,Tu,Sim, C, D,CoH,CoU,CoA,DN,Y,P600,P500
Talla Cleuch Head	691	Tu,Sim, D,GT,DN
Middle Hill	717	Tu,Sim, D,GT,DN
Drumelzier Law	668	Tu,Sim, D,sHu,GT,DN
Pykestone Hill	737	Hu,Tu,Sim, D,GT,DN,Y

== Other information ==
The Southern Upland Way passes through the eastern end of the range, coming close to the summit of Minch Moor; this is the second highest point of the route after the Lowther Hills.
