= Greenside Law =

Hill in the Southern Uplands of Scotland

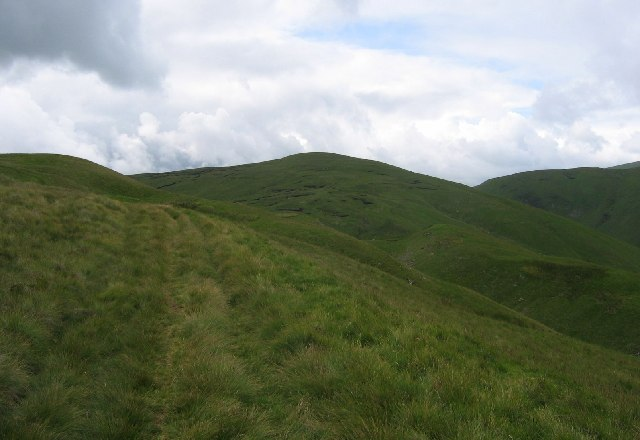

Highest point
- Elevation: 643 m (2,110 ft)
- Prominence: 77 m (253 ft)
- Listing: Tu,Sim,D,GT,DN

Geography
- Location: Scottish Borders, Scotland
- Parent range: Manor Hills, Southern Uplands
- OS grid: NT 19791 25621
- Topo map: OS Landranger 72

Greenside Law is a hill in the Manor Hills range, part of the Southern Uplands of Scotland. The lowest Donald hill in the range, it is situated at the head of the Manor Valley, with its position somewhat in-between the adjacent ridges on its west and east. The easiest ascents (i.e. those with paths) are from the Manor Valley itself to the north, or Craigierig Farm to the south.
