= Corranabinnia =

Mountain in Mayo, Ireland

- Coire na Binne
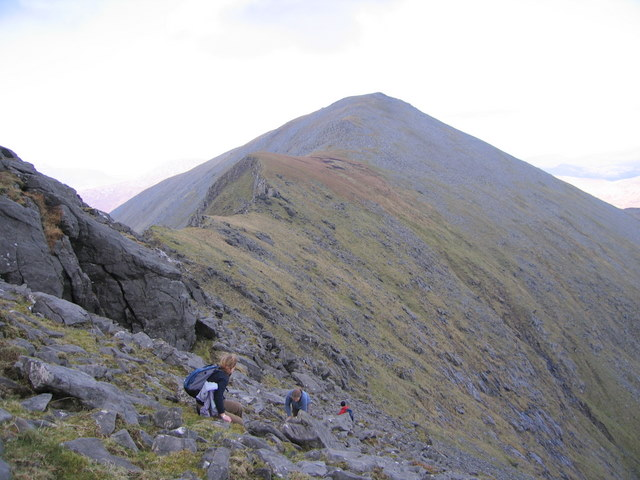
- Corranabinnia from its southwest ridge

Highest point
- Elevation: 716 m (2,349 ft)
- Prominence: 540 m (1,770 ft)
- Listing: Hewitt, Marilyn
- Coordinates: 53°57′58″N 9°40′20″W

Naming
- English translation: hollow of the peak
- Language of name: Irish

Geography
- Location within island of Ireland
- Location: County Mayo, Ireland
- Parent range: Nephin Beg Range

Corranabinnia (from Irish Coire na Binne, meaning 'hollow of the peak') is a mountain with a height of 716 metres (2,349 ft) in County Mayo, Ireland. It is also known as Cushcamcarragh (from Irish Coiscéim Charrach, meaning 'rocky step') and is part of the Nephin Beg Range.

It has several spurs, including Bengorm to the east. The mountain overlooks several corries and glens, including Corranabinnia Lough (west), Corryloughaphuill (north), Glennamong (east), Glendahurk (southeast), Glenthomas (southwest).

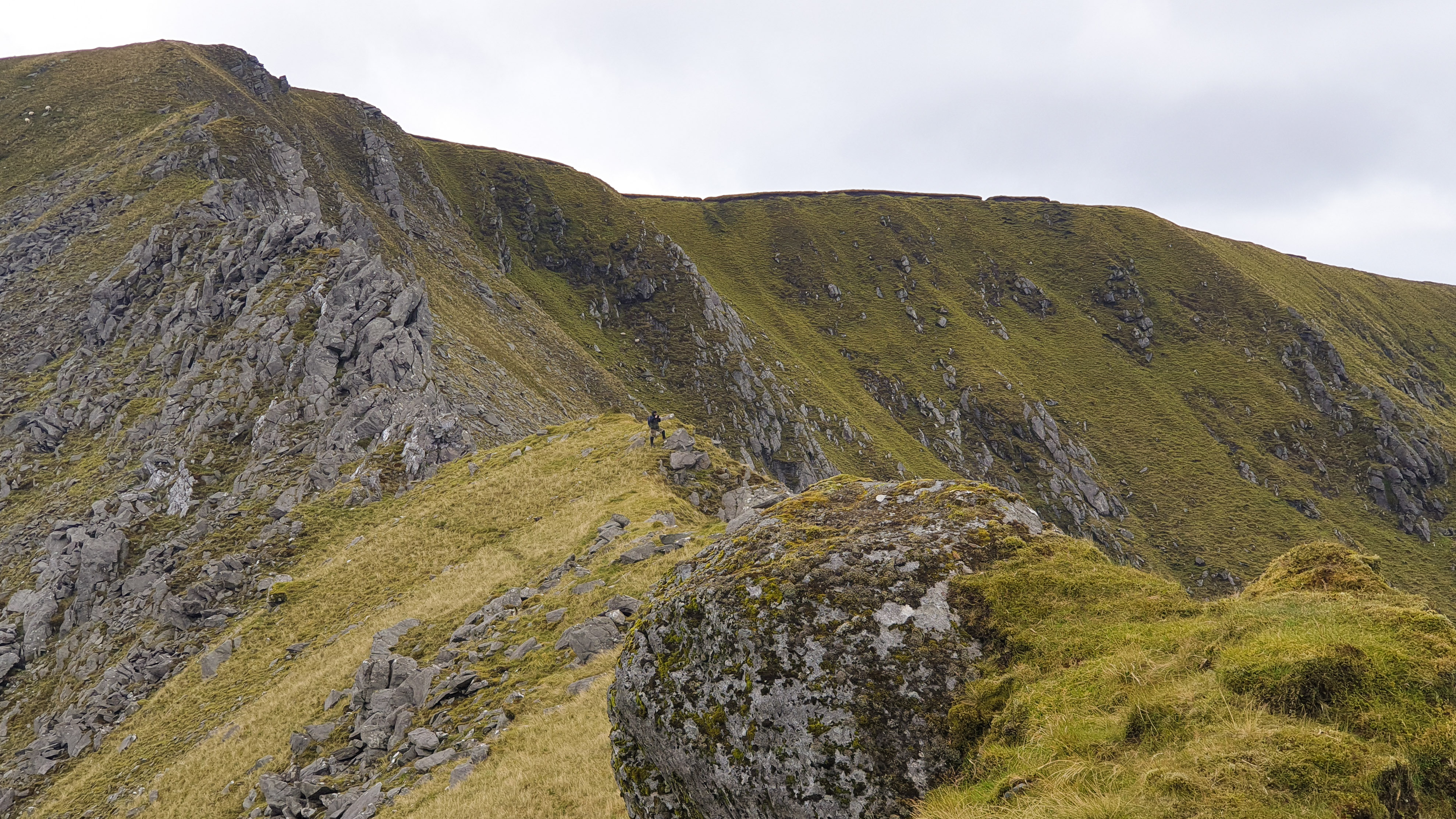
Corranabinnia

== See also ==
- Lists of mountains in Ireland
- List of mountains of the British Isles by height (1501–2000)
- List of Marilyns in the British Isles
- List of Hewitt mountains in England, Wales and Ireland
