= Stob Law =

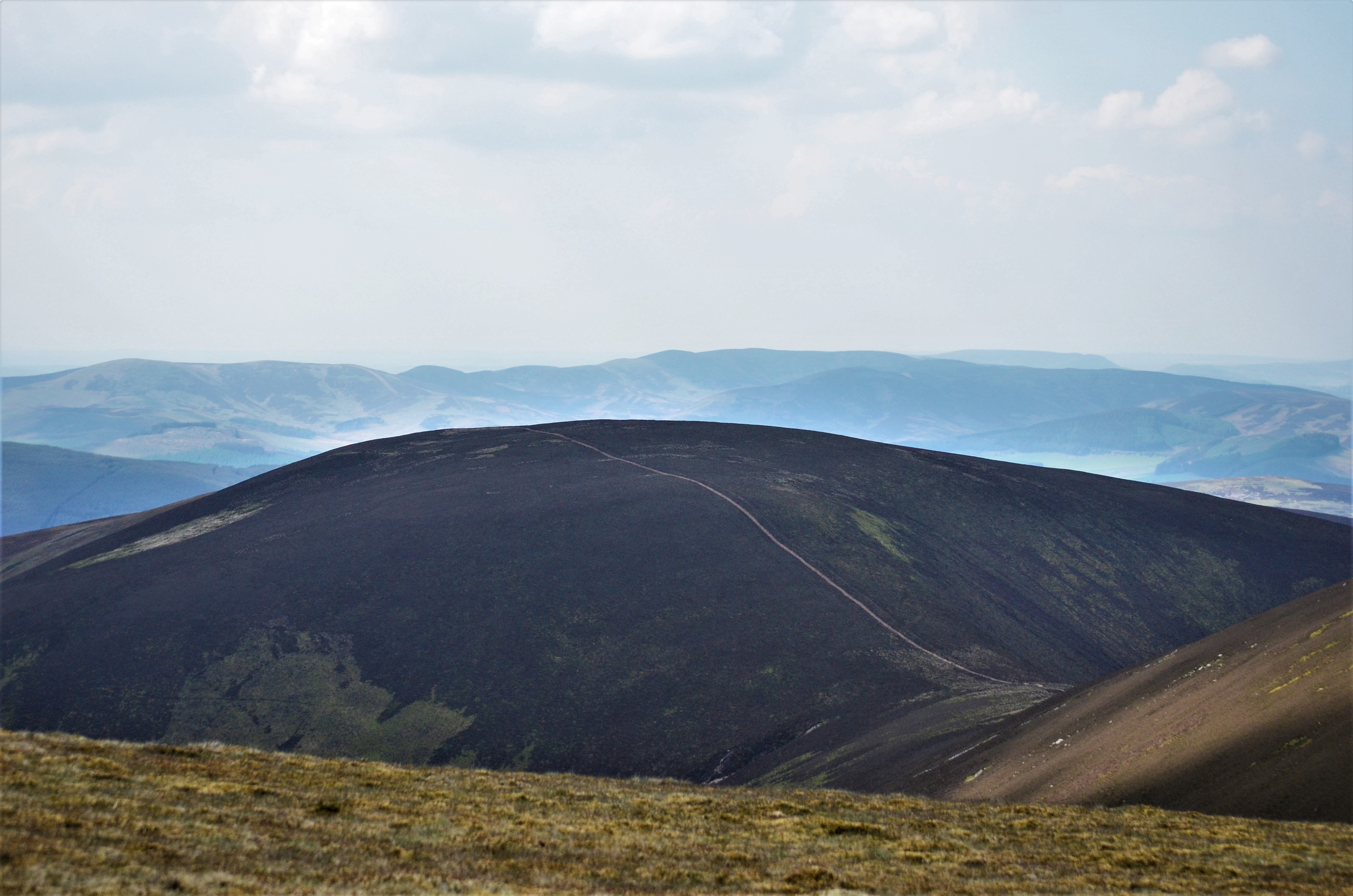

Highest point
- Elevation: 676 m (2,218 ft)
- Prominence: 67 m (220 ft)
- Listing: Tu,Sim,D,GT,DN

Naming
- English translation: Scots: Stake Hill

Geography
- Location: Scottish Borders, Scotland
- Parent range: Manor Hills, Southern Uplands
- OS grid: NT 23022 33259
- Topo map: OS Landranger 73

Stob Law is a hill in the Manor Hills range, part of the Southern Uplands of Scotland. It is normally climbed as an outlier of the Dun Rig horseshoe, starting from Peebles.
