= Middle Hill (Scottish Borders) =

Hill in the Southern Uplands of Scotland

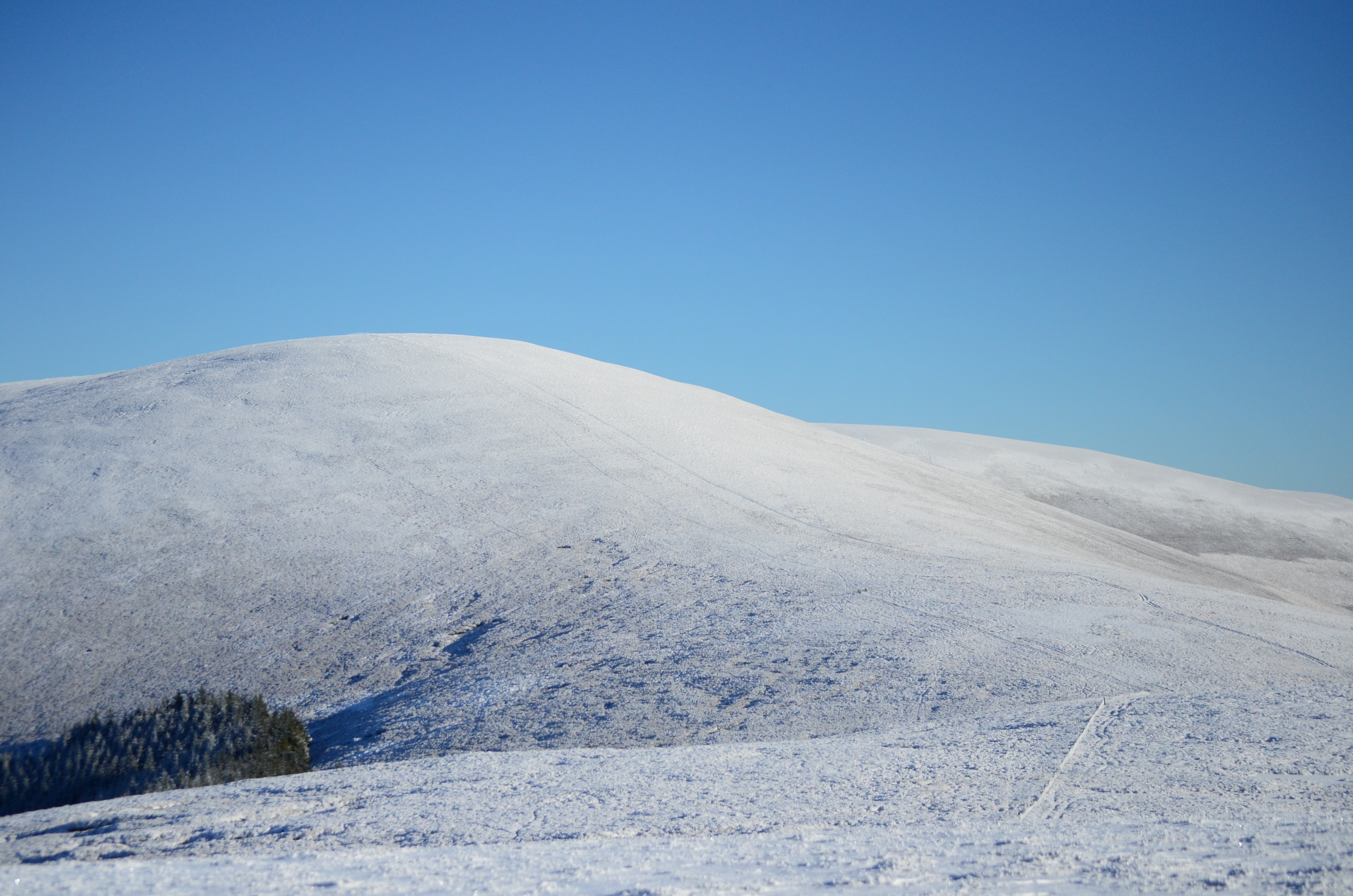

Highest point
- Elevation: 717.2 m (2,353 ft)
- Prominence: 41.8 m (137 ft)
- Listing: Tu,Sim,D,GT,DN

Geography
- Location: Scottish Borders, Scotland
- Parent range: Manor Hills, Southern Uplands
- OS grid: NT 15944 29443
- Topo map: OS Landranger 72

Middle Hill is a hill in the Manor Hills range, part of the Southern Uplands of Scotland. It is often climbed from Drumelzier to the north or Stanhope Farm to the west, but ascents from the Manor Valley to the east are also possible.

== Subsidiary SMC Summits ==
Summit	Height (m)	Listing
Taberon Law	636.8	DT,sSim
