= Talla Cleuch Head =

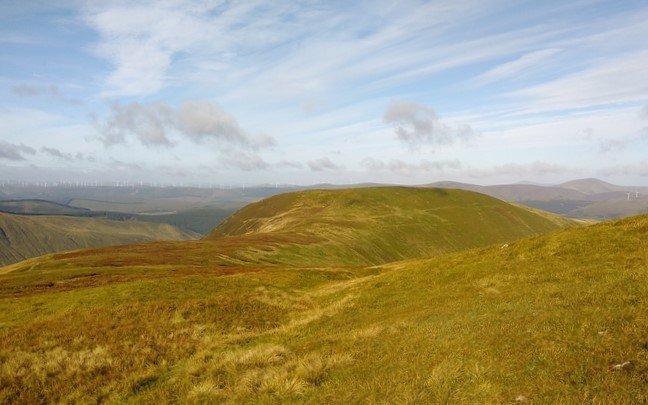

Highest point
- Elevation: 691 m (2,267 ft)
- Prominence: 63 m (207 ft)
- Listing: Tu,Sim,D,GT,DN

Geography
- Location: Scottish Borders, Scotland
- Parent range: Manor Hills, Southern Uplands
- OS grid: NT 13348 21827
- Topo map: OS Landranger 72

Talla Cleuch Head is a hill in the Manor Hills range, part of the Southern Uplands of Scotland. As ascents are either long or steep from all other sides, Talla Cleuch Head is normally climbed from the Megget Stane to the southeast, which allows for a deer fence to be followed to the summit.
