= Glenrath Heights =

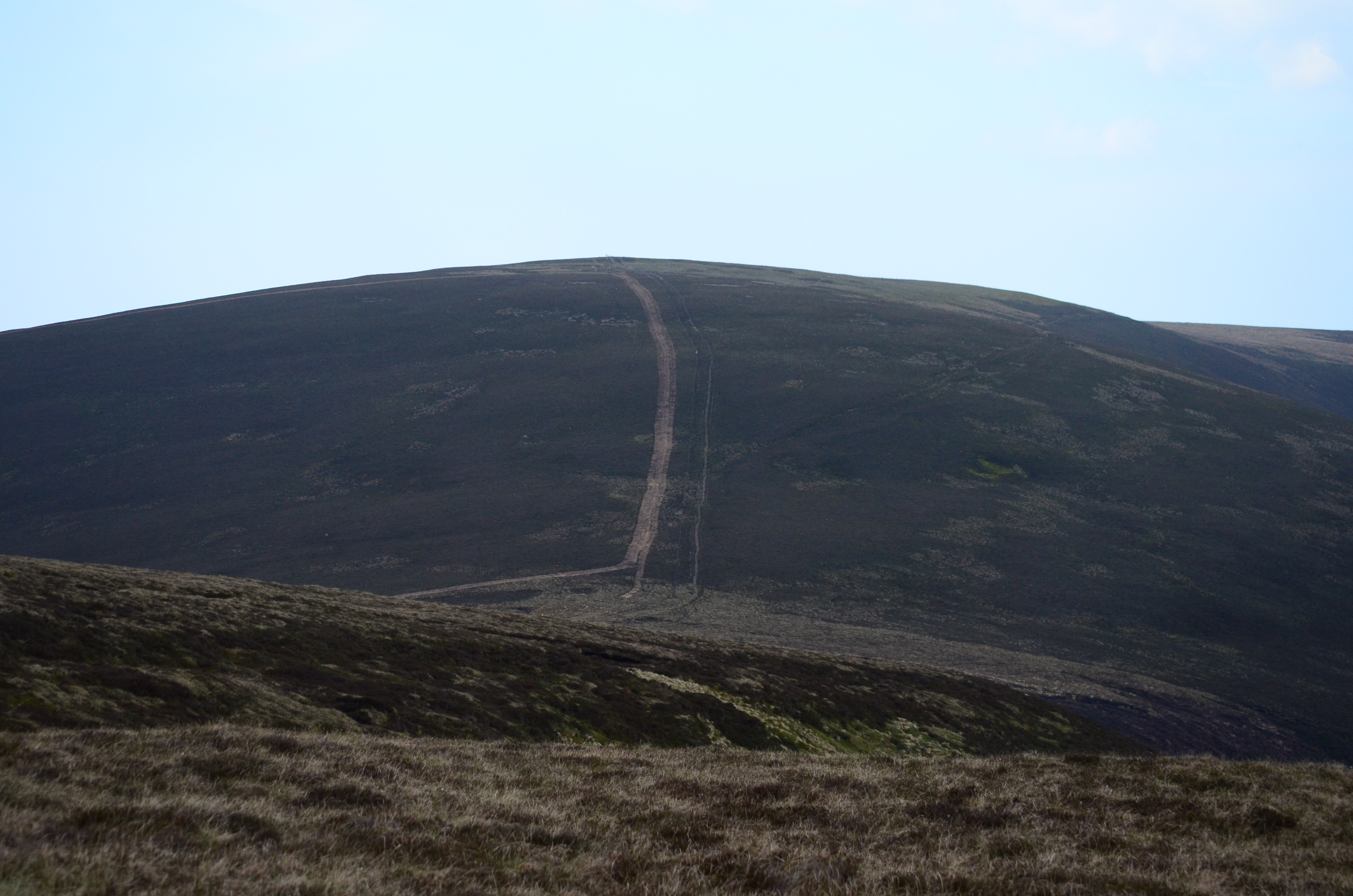

Highest point
- Elevation: 732 m (2,402 ft)
- Prominence: 87 m (285 ft)
- Listing: Tu,Sim,D,GT,DN

Geography
- Location: Scottish Borders, Scotland
- Parent range: Manor Hills, Southern Uplands
- OS grid: NT 24176 32249
- Topo map: OS Landranger 73

Glenrath Heights is a hill in the Manor Hills range, part of the Southern Uplands of Scotland. It is the second highest hill in a route of hills known as the Dun Rig Horseshoe, south of Peebles.
