= Pykestone Hill =

Hill in Scotland

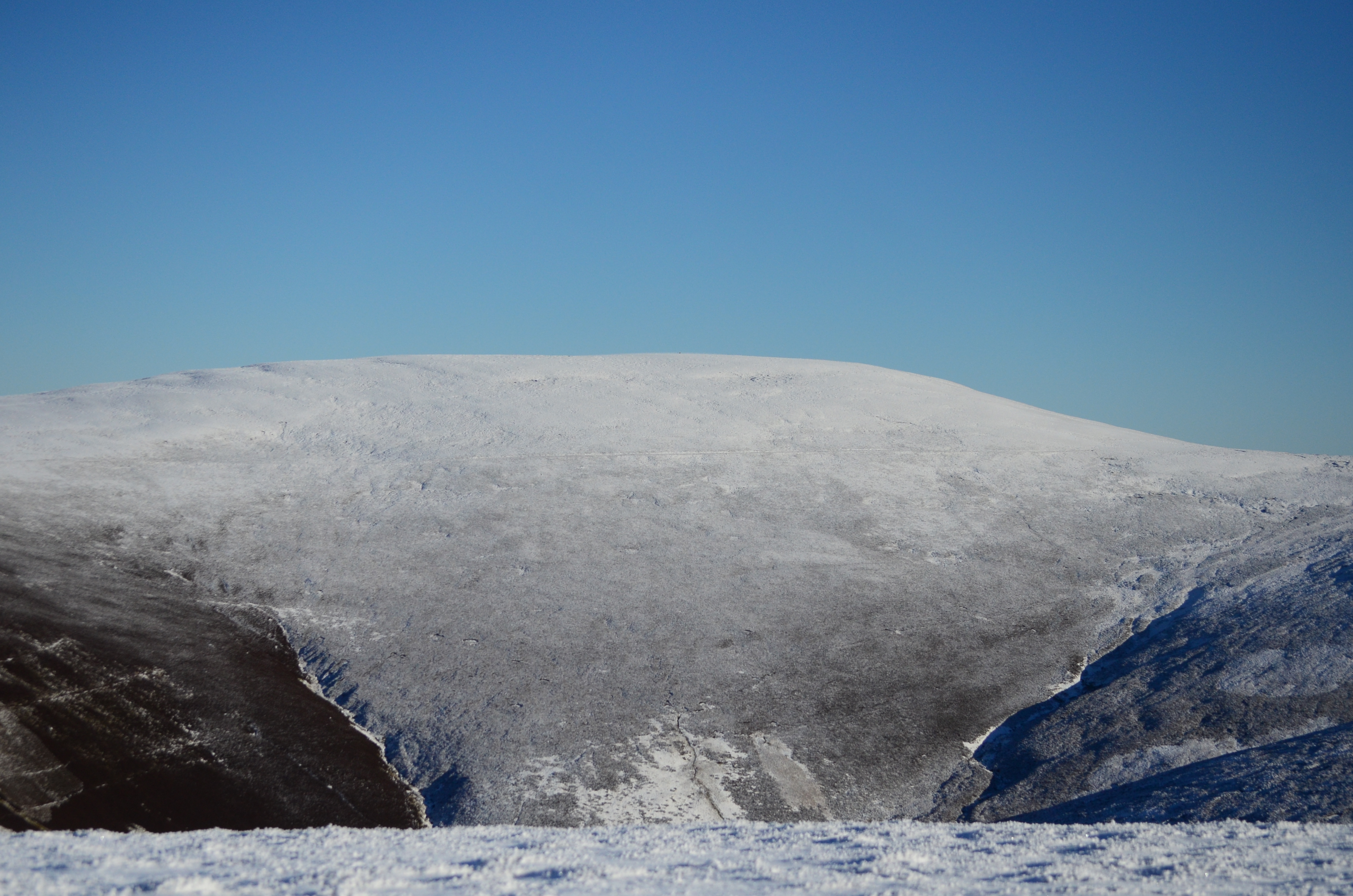

Highest point
- Elevation: 737 m (2,418 ft)
- Prominence: 133 m (436 ft)
- Listing: Hu,Tu,Sim,D,GT,DN,Y

Geography
- Location: Scottish Borders, Scotland
- Parent range: Manor Hills, Southern Uplands
- OS grid: NT 17304 31257
- Topo map: OS Landranger 72

Pykestone Hill is a hill in the Manor Hills range, part of the Southern Uplands of Scotland. The highest of a small group of hills near the village of Drumelzier, they are themselves a western portion of the Manor Hills. The summit is characterised by a series of sharp, protruding stones, from which the hill likely derives its name. It is often climbed from Drumelzier itself or Stanhope farm to the west, but ascents from the Manor Valley to the east are also possible.

== Subsidiary SMC Summits ==
Summit	Height (m)	Listing
The Scrape	719	Tu,Sim,DT,GT,DN
