= Dun Rig =

Hill of the Southern Uplands of Scotland

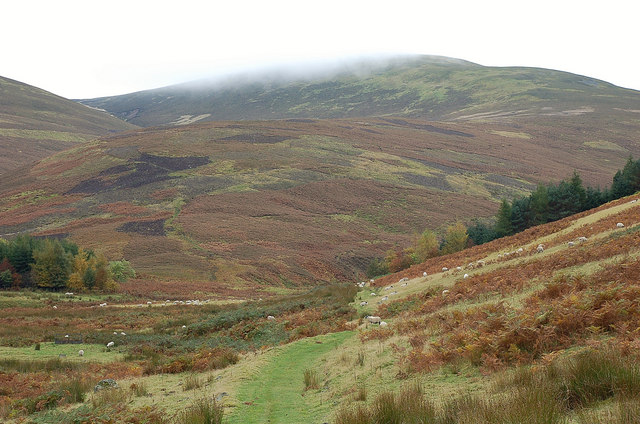

Highest point
- Elevation: 744 m (2,441 ft)
- Prominence: 243 m (797 ft)
- Listing: Ma,Hu,Tu,Sim,G,D,DN,Y
- Coordinates: 55°34′20″N 3°11′06″W

Geography
- Location: Scottish Borders, Scotland
- Parent range: Manor Hills, Southern Uplands
- OS grid: NT 25317 31547
- Topo map: OS Landranger 73

Dun Rig is a hill in the Manor Hills range, part of the Southern Uplands of Scotland. It is the highest hill in the northernmost cluster of the Manor Hills, south of the town of Peebles in the Scottish Borders. A sprawling summit, it is usually climbed as part of the Dun Rig Horseshoe from the Peebles side and provides great views into the Moorfoot Hills, Pentlands, rest of the Manor Hills and the central Borders. It is the historic county top of the former county of Selkirkshire.
