= Beinn a' Chuallaich =

Hill in Scotland

Coordinates: 56.7293°N 4.1513°W

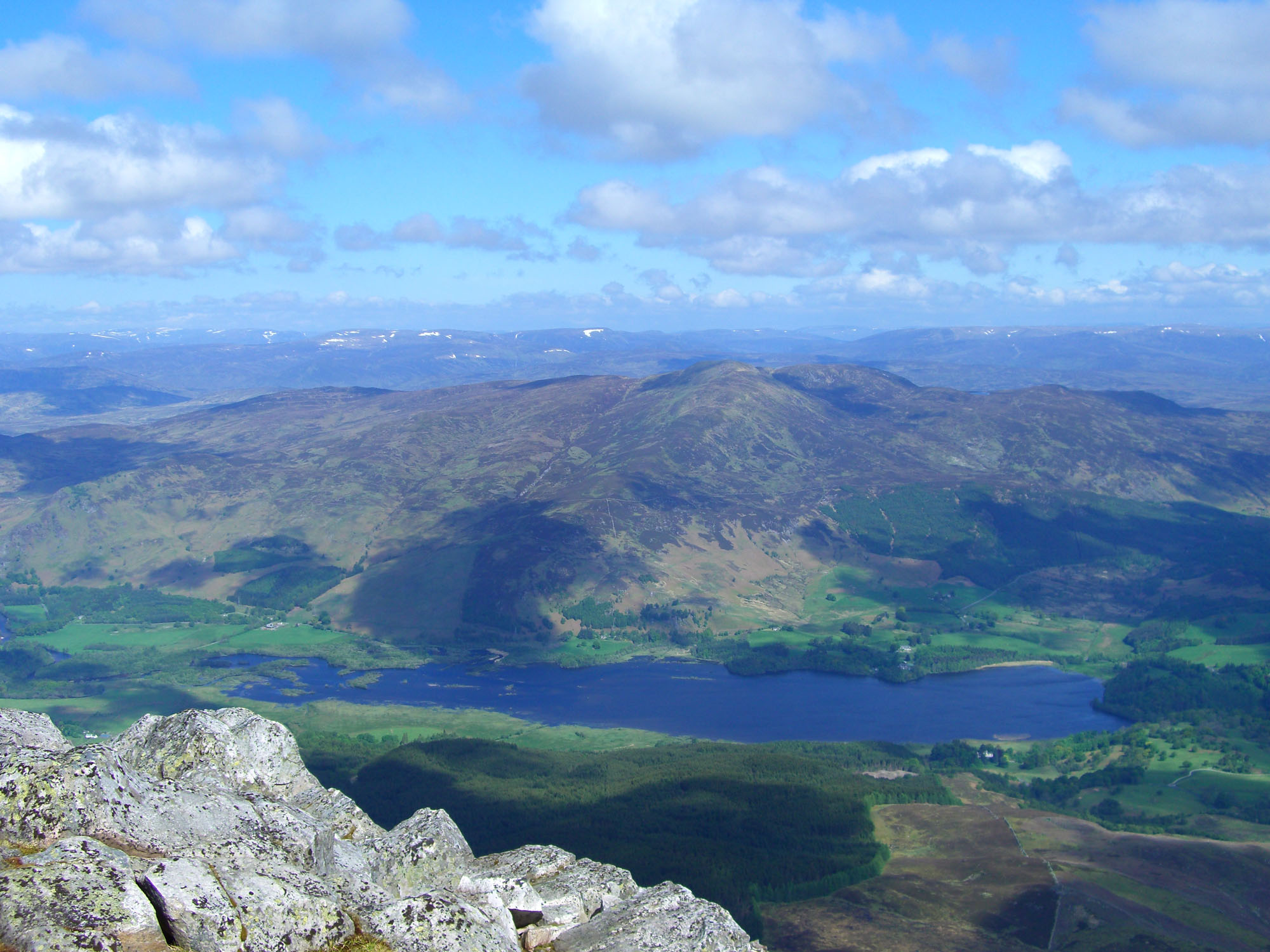
- Seen across Dunalastair Water from Schiehallion, 7 km to the SE.

Highest point
- Elevation: 892 m (2,927 ft)
- Prominence: 527 m (1,729 ft)
- Listing: Corbett, Marilyn

Naming
- English translation: Hill of the Herding
- Language of name: Gaelic
- Pronunciation: Scottish Gaelic: [ˈpeiɲ ə ˈxuəl̪ˠɪç]

Geography
- Location within Scotland
- Location: Perth and Kinross, Scotland
- Parent range: Grampians
- OS grid: NN684617
- Topo map: OS Landranger 42, OS Explorer 386

Beinn a' Chuallaich is a Scottish hill, four kilometres northeast of the village of Kinloch Rannoch in the Perth and Kinross council area. It is part of the high ground between Strath Tummel and Glen Errochty.

== Overview ==
Beinn a’ Chuallaich is a sizeable and extensive hill which can seem quite inconspicuous when viewed from certain places, especially from the south. This is mainly because of the close proximity of the more eye catching and higher Schiehallion which lies seven km to the SE across Dunalastair Water and dominates Strath Tummel. However Beinn a' Chuallaich is well seen from the head of Glen Errochty where it shows its long NE ridge and its craggy eastern corrie. The hill reaches a height of 892 metres (2926 feet) and qualifies as a Corbett and a Marilyn.

== Etymology ==
The hill's name translates from the Scottish Gaelic language as “Hill of the Herding” and this refers to the fact that it lies on the route of one of the main north-south ancient drovers' roads of Scotland, the area around the mountain was used as a gathering point for the cattle. The western corrie of the hill could well have been the collecting point as it is a huge gentle bowl which is ideal for summer grazing and the concealing of cattle. James Stobie's map of 1770 refers to the hill as Ben Chualach, Charles Knight’s Penny Cyclopaedia of the 1840s also uses this name and the hill seems to have been designated as Beinn a’ Chuallaich by Victorian cartographers in the second half of the 19th century.

== Geography ==
Beinn a’ Chuallaich's large bulk dominates the village of Kinloch Rannoch and contains several long ridges and two significant corries. The longest of the ridges goes north and then NE taking in the subsidiary top of Meall nan Eun (852 metres) before broadening and descending NE to the shores of Loch Errochty. The top of Meall nan Eun is marked by a ring of stones and gives a fine view of Loch Errochty which is not visible from the main summit. Loch na Caillich stands on this NE ridge at a height of around 700 metres and is a well known gathering point for deer with Charles Plumb describing it as a place “where the deer love to wallow”. Coire Odhar on the eastern side of the hill is ringed by cliffs which fall from the summit, the corrie itself contains some very large detached boulders. The western corrie, known as Coire Labhrainn is drained by the Allt Mòr which is a fine sight after heavy rain as it roars through the woodland above Kinloch Rannoch and through the village to join the River Tummel. All drainage from the mountain joins the River Tay eventually either going by Glen Errochty or Strath Tummel. Some of the streams on the eastern side of the hill have been diverted into the Errochty catchwater as part of the Tummel hydro-electric power scheme.

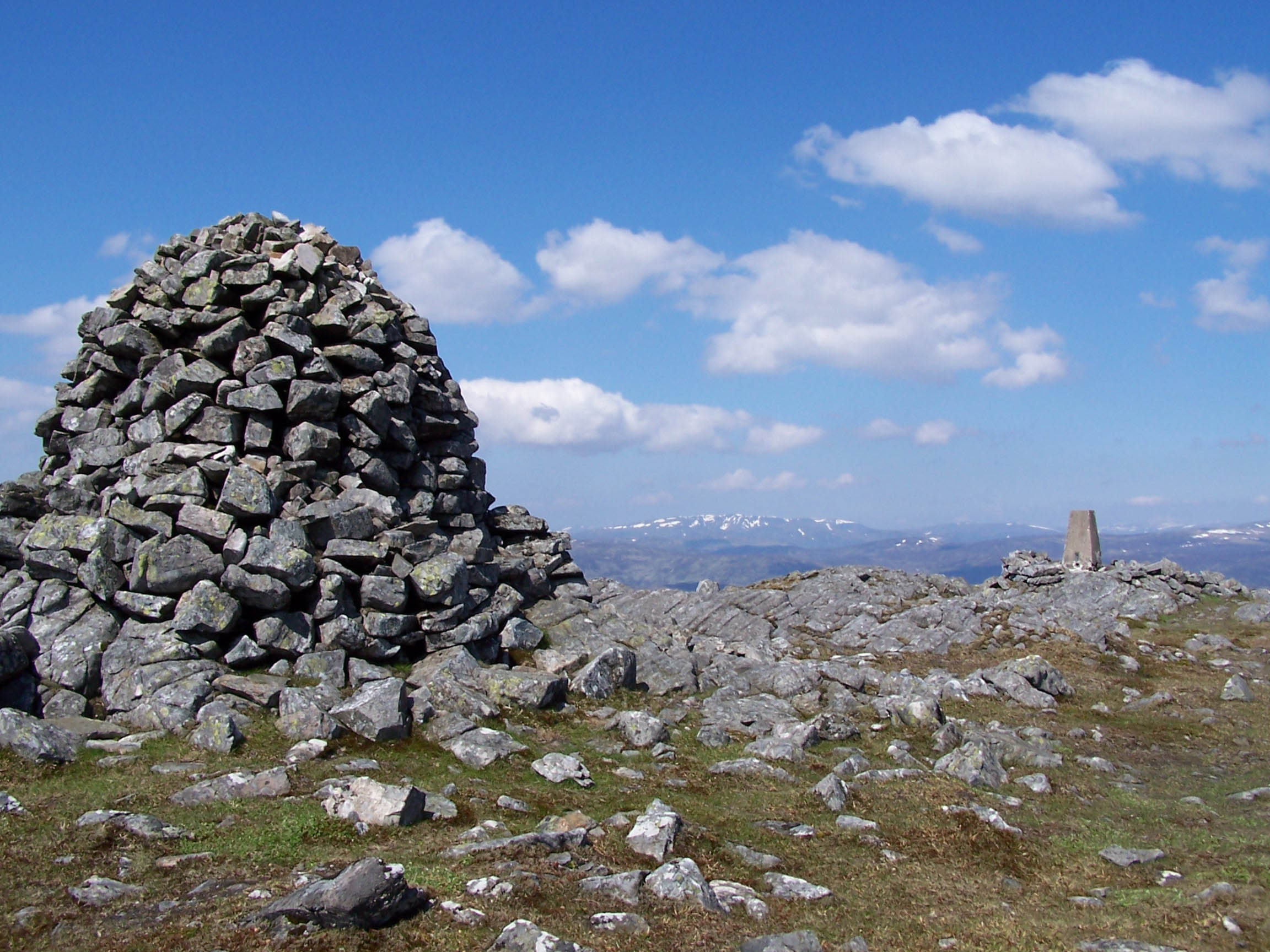
The summit with the large cairn and trig point with Ben Alder in the distance.

The three southern ridges are quite steep as they drop away to the valley of the River Tummel. One goes initially west and then south taking in the craggy and rocky slopes of the outlying top of Càrn Fiaclach. Another ridge goes just east of south descending to Drumglas on the shores of Dunalistair Water and has the crags of Creag Buidhe on its lower slopes. The third of the ridges on the south side of the mountain goes just west of south and is the most interesting of the three as it ends in a steep and spectacular crag which drops to the B846 road just east of Kinloch Rannoch. The crag is known as Craig Varr and is an example of a truncated spur formed in the Earth's last glacial period about 10,000 years ago when the huge glacier flowing east from Rannoch Moor sliced through the ridge descending to the valley and left steep south facing cliffs.

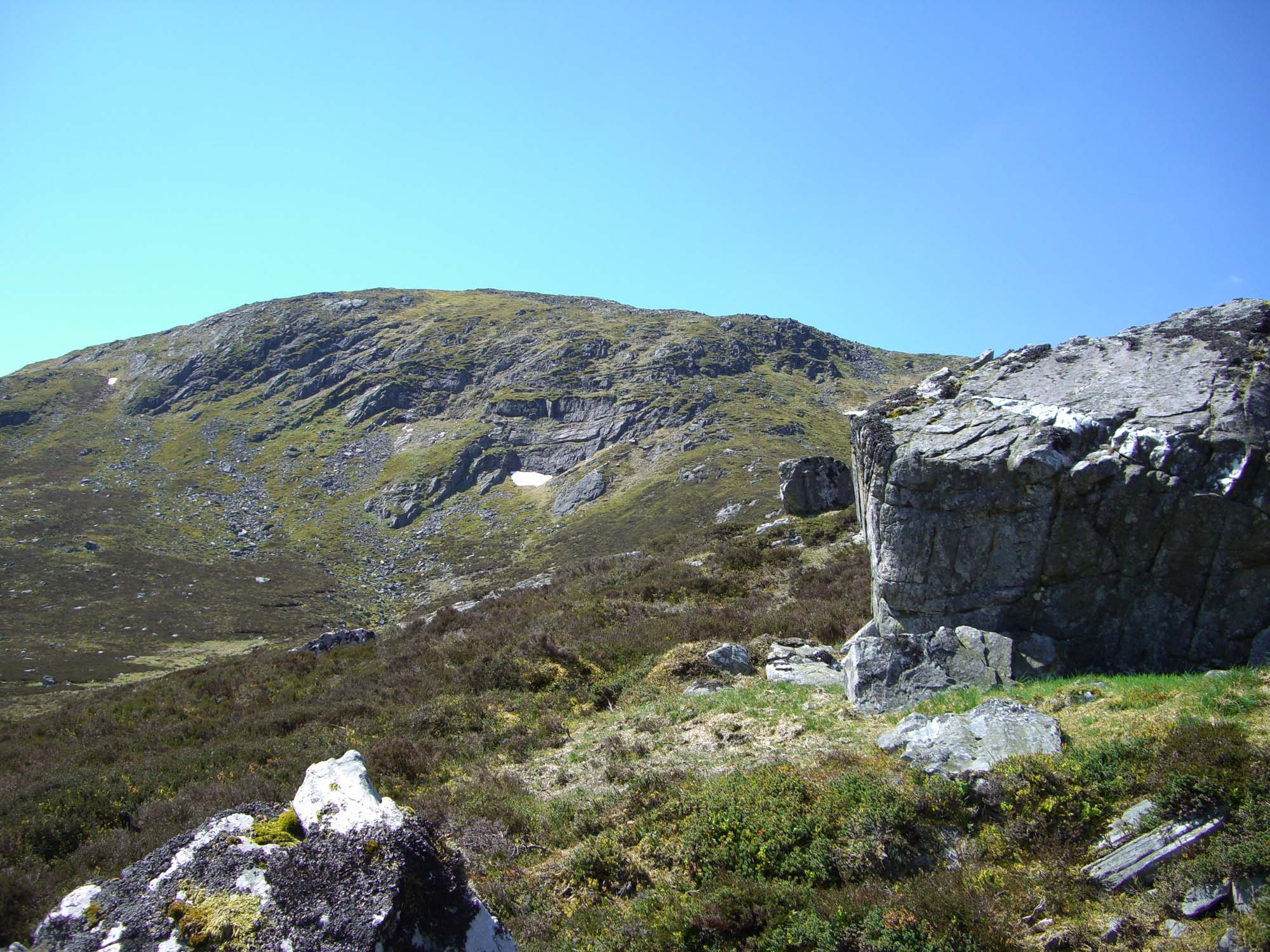
Approaching the summit from the east from the large boulders in Coire Odhar.

== Rock climbing ==
The crags of Craig Varr are a popular venue for rock climbers being close to the road and parking spots. The 100-metre-high (330 ft) schist crags contain around 30 routes from 30 to 50 metres in length, varying in grade from Very Difficult to Very Severe. The crags are south facing, a fact which adds to their popularity, being quick drying and catching plenty of sunshine.

== Ascents and summit ==
Beinn a’ Chuallaich is usually ascended from the south or the east. From the south there are routes from Kinloch Rannoch and Drumglas. From Kinloch Rannoch the route goes up the Allt Mòr, passing a fine waterfall before going steep up to the summit ridge. The route from Drumglas is the most direct and utilises the SE ridge. An approach from the east starts from the B847 road at grid reference NN706616 and goes past a bothy and a deer fence before going steeply up to climb Coire Odhar and reach the summit.

Beinn a’ Chuallaich is a fine viewpoint, having a topographic prominence of 527 metres, it is the highest point for some distance with Schiehallion, over seven km to the SE being the only hill to interrupt the distant view. There is a fine full length view of Loch Rannoch and the Ben Alder massif to the NW. The highest point of the hill is marked by an Ordnance Survey trig point but the highlight of the summit is the three-metre-high cairn built from quartzite boulders which stands 20 metres SE of the trig point.
