= Dunalastair Water =

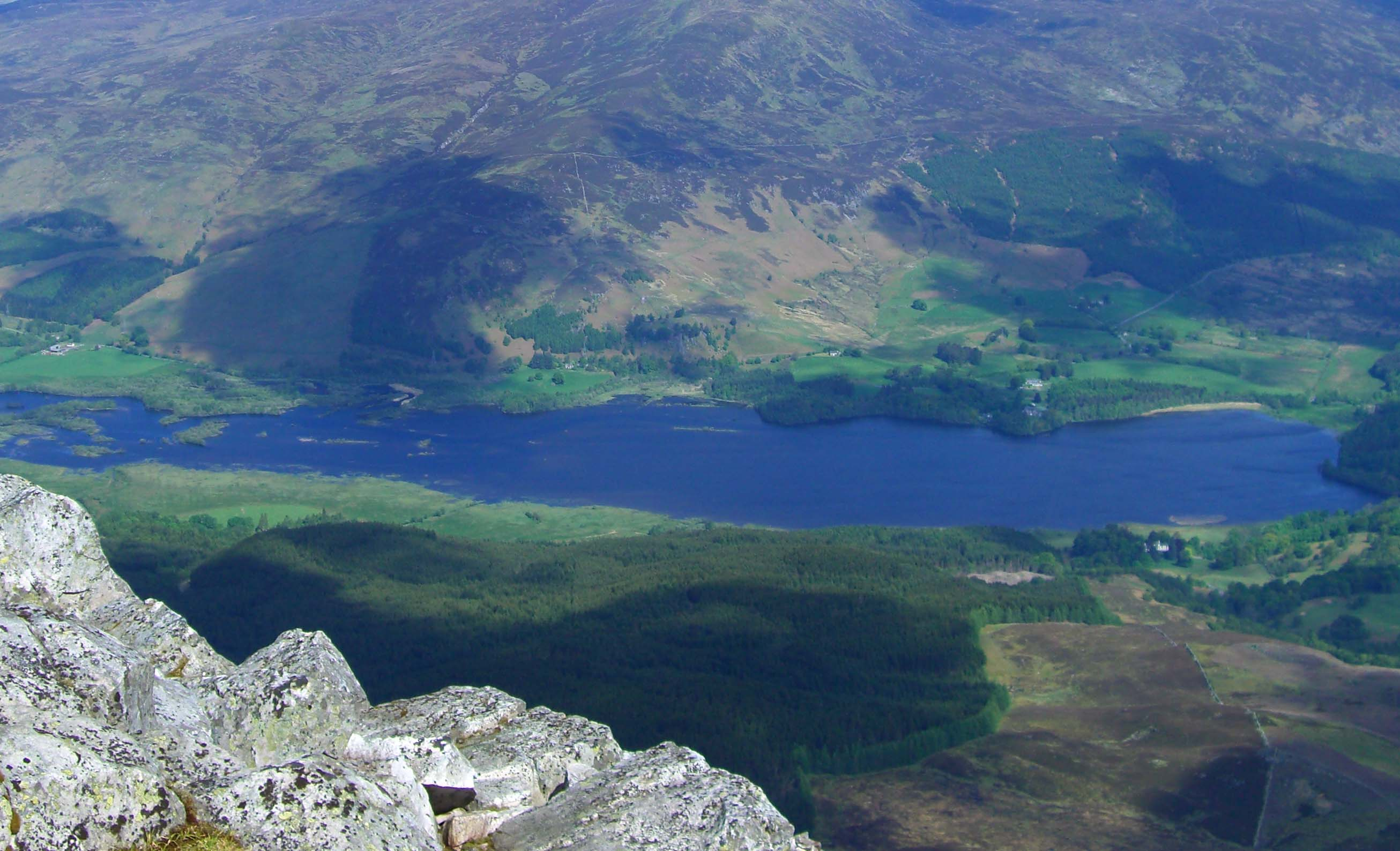
- Seen from the high ground to the south

- Location within Perth and Kinross
- Location: Perth and Kinross, Scotland
- Coordinates: 56°41′55″N 4°7′45″W
- Type: freshwater loch, reservoir
- Basin countries: Scotland
- Max. length: 2.5 km (1.6 mi)
- Max. width: 800 m (2,600 ft)
- Surface area: 1.65 km^{2} (0.64 sq mi)
- Average depth: 1.5 m (4 ft 11 in)
- Surface elevation: 198 m (650 ft)

Dunalastair Water (Scottish Gaelic: "Loch Dhùn Alastair") is an entirely man made reservoir in Scotland which lies between Loch Rannoch and Loch Tummel in Strath Tummel in Perth and Kinross council area. The loch provides water power for the Tummel hydroelectricity power station and has the reputation as one of the best wild trout fishing locations in the United Kingdom.

== Overview ==
Dunalastair Water lies at the approximate grid reference of NN697584 it has an area of 165 hectares, being 2.5 km long and 800 metres wide at its broadest point. It was formed by the damming of the River Tummel by the Grampian Electric Supply Company in 1933 as part of the Tummel hydro-electric power scheme. The reservoir is narrow at its head, taking the form of a slender wooded glen with the Dunalastair estate situated on the northern bank. The reservoir has roads running on both its northern and southern shores, the B846, which is the road between Pitlochry and Rannoch railway station runs on the northern shore while a minor road from Kinloch Rannoch runs on its southern side. The Water is hemmed in by high ground to the north and south, with Beinn a' Chuallaich to the north and Schiehallion to the south.

The dam itself is 65 metres wide and has two floodgates and several spillways due to the quantity of water which sometimes needs to be released Into the River Tummel. The main purpose of the dam is to act as an intake which supplies water to an open 15 metre wide concrete aqueduct that runs to the south of the River Tummel. The aqueduct flows for five km losing very little height, keeping to the 200 metre contour before feeding the Tummel hydroelectricity power station at the head of Loch Tummel through two large pipes.

== Biology ==
Dunalastair Water is a shallow reservoir, having an average depth of only 1.5 metres and this provides unique biological conditions for birds with the site around the Water being declared a SSSI over an area of 241.6 hectares. Among the birds which can be seen on the site are Old World warbler, willow warbler, bittern, grey heron, egret, kinglet and goldcrest. Gives list of birds on loch. Dunalastair Water is a first-rate venue for fishing with the shallow waters warming quickly and generating good feeding for the fish and providing a huge variety of insect life. There are some very large brown trout which inhabit the water and feed mainly at night. Fishing is strictly from boats and outboard motors are banned. The dam incorporates a fish ladder this is of the pool and weir design and consists of 18 pools.
