= McConnico =

McConnico is a surname of Scottish origin, a derivation of the McConnachie/McConochie/MacConnochie name in 1600s Scotland. The first known person with the surname is William McConnico, born in Edinburgh in 1702. The McConnico/McConochie family is affiliated with the Duncan (Clan Donnachaidh), Robertson, and Campbell clans, and has historical roots in the Midlothian, Argyll, Alyth Perthshire regions of Scotland.

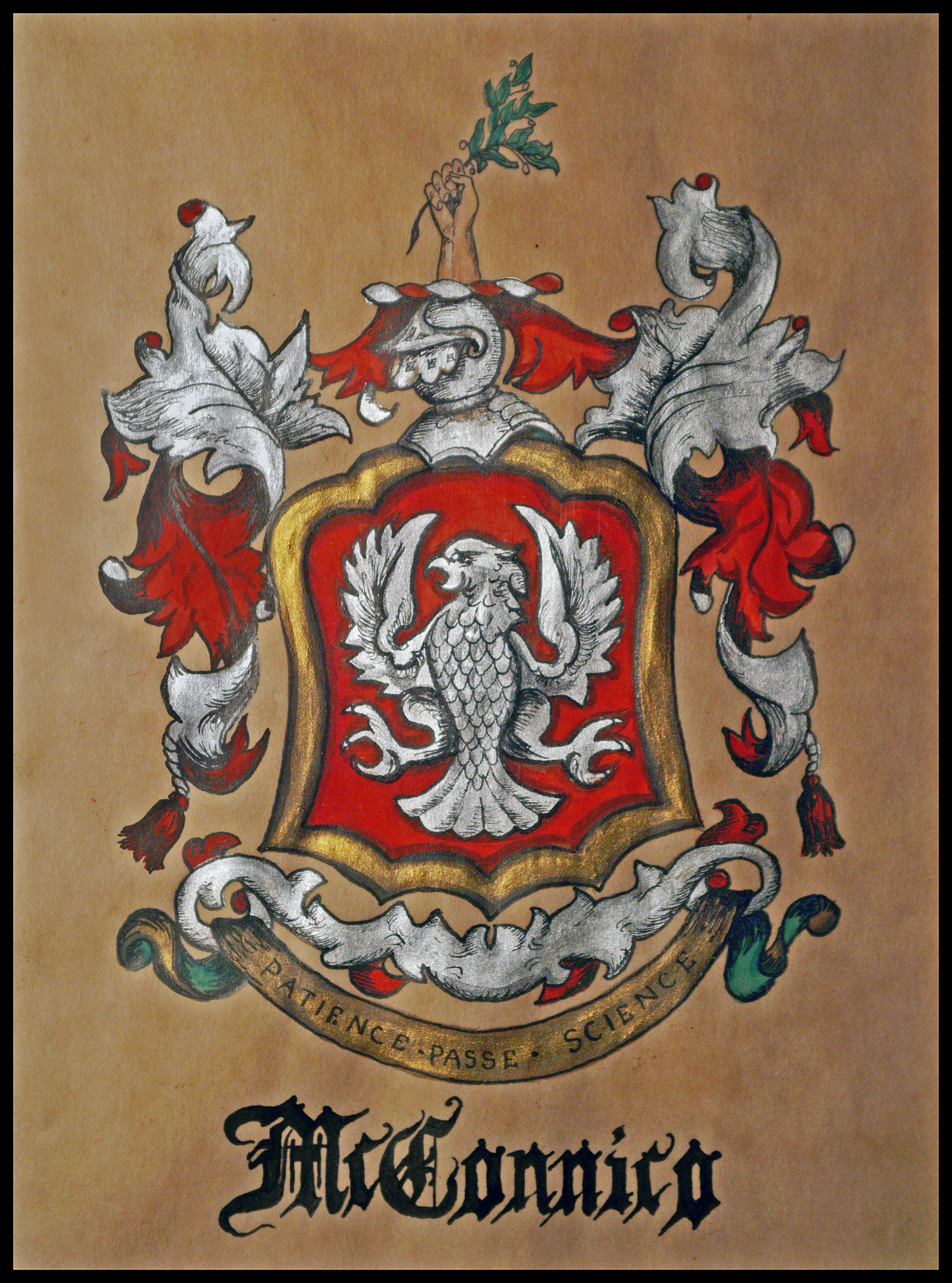
McConnico Coat of Arms, circa early 1700s

Notable people with the surname include:

- Hilton McConnico (born 1943), American artist
- John McConnico, American photographer

== See also ==
- McConnico, Arizona, an unincorporated community
