= Clach na Bratach =

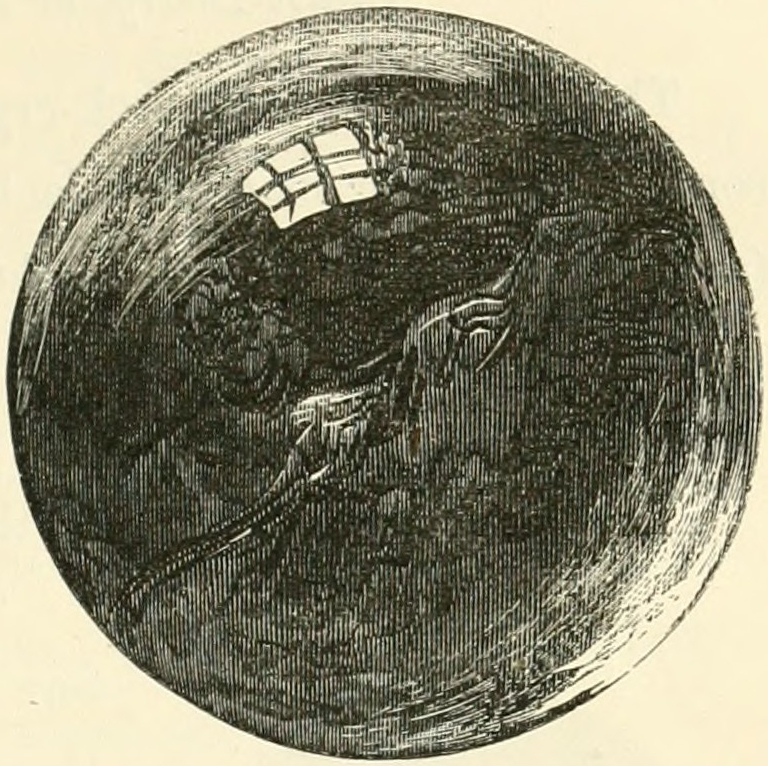
Clach na Bratach of the Robertsons of Struan (woodcut, sometime before 1872)

The Clach na Bratach, also known as the Stone of the Standard, is a charm-stone believed to have magical properties that was owned by the Clan Donnachaidh. It is a globe of transparent crystal that was described by antiquarian James Simpson as "about the size of a small apple.

It was allegedly found by Duncan Ard (b. 1275) in 1315 on his way to Bannockburn. It was believed to heal illness in domestic animals and people, and had some clairvoyant properties. If it clouded over, it foretold ill-fortune in battle.

== Current Housing ==
The Clach na Bratach is currently housed at the Clan Donnachaidh Museum in Pitlochry, Perthshire. The museum showcases a variety of exhibits related to the history and heritage of Clan Donnachaidh, including the Clach na Bratach.
