= Dunalastair =

Estate in the southern part of the Scottish Highlands

Coordinates: 56.7036°N 4.1078°W

The building in 2005

Dunalastair (Scottish Gaelic: Dùn Alastair, meaning "fort of Alexander") is an estate in the southern part of the Highlands, in Perthshire, Scotland. It is 18 miles (29 km) west of the town of Pitlochry, lying along the River Tummel between Tummel Bridge to the east and Kinloch Rannoch to the west, and incorporates part of Dunalastair Water.

Dunalastair is close to a former home of the Clan Donnachaidh, known as Clan Robertson in English, of Scotland. However the present ruined house, despite widespread but incorrect information, has no association with the clan, the land having been sold prior to its construction. The Clan's family lived nearby until the 1850s, and there is a burial ground of the chiefs of the Clan in the grounds. There is the ruin of an old baronial-style mansion in the grounds, built in 1862 by General Macdonald, the then-owner of Dunalastair. The original tower house was burnt down after the 1745 rebellion, as the great chieftain Alexander Robertson of Struan was a Jacobite supporter. Another house built on the site was demolished by General Macdonald in order to build the current building.

The estate is overlooked by the peak of Schiehallion, a conical mountain sometimes translated as "Fairy hill of the Caledonians".
