= Loch Tummel =

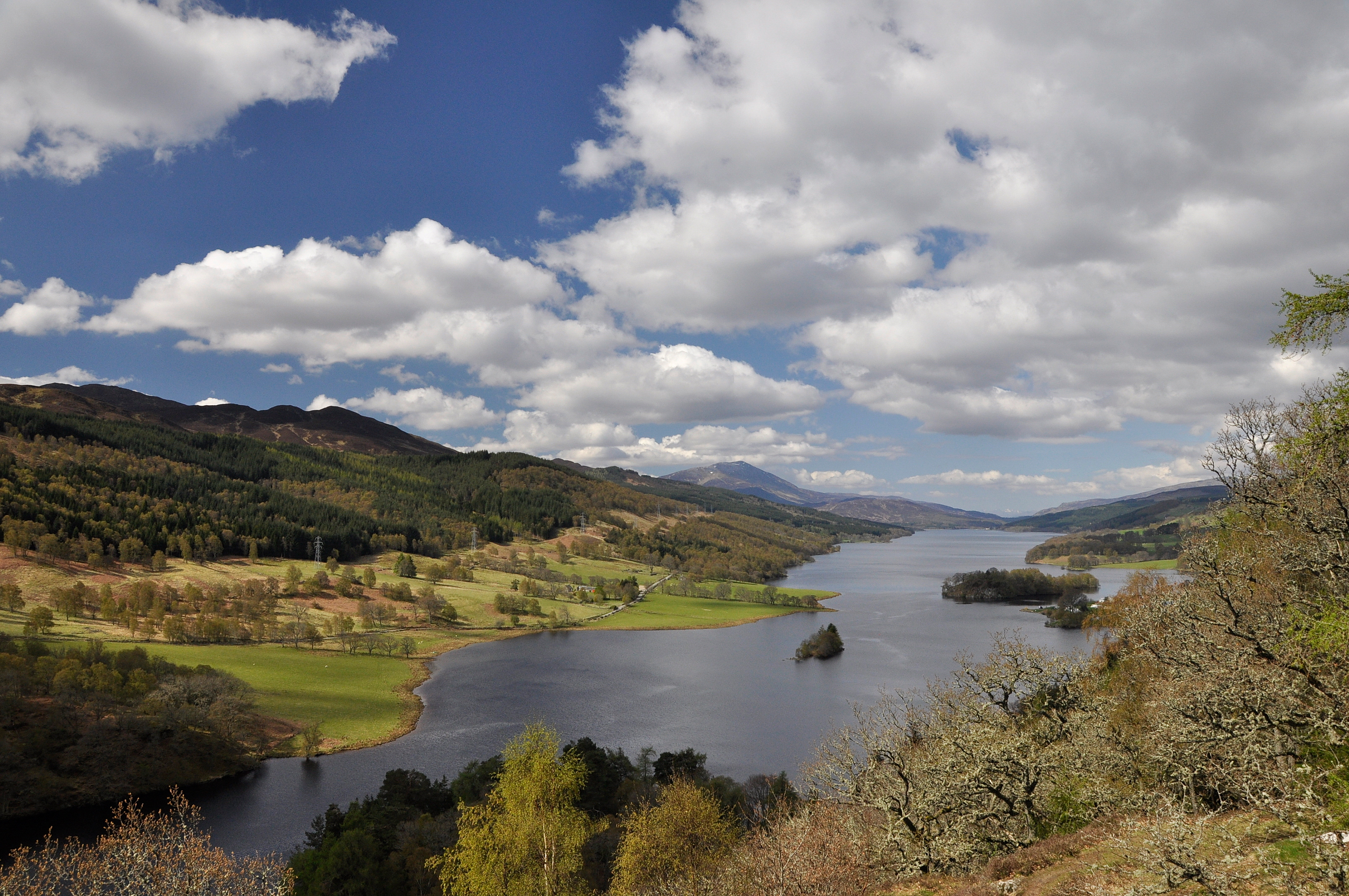
- The 'Queen's View'

- Loch Rannoch shown within Perth and Kinross.
- Location: Perth and Kinross, Scotland
- Coordinates: 56.7107°N 3.9290°W
- Type: freshwater loch
- Basin countries: Scotland
- Max. length: 11 km (7 mi)
- Max. width: 0.95 km (0.59 mi)
- Surface area: 579.1 ha (1,431 acres)
- Max. depth: 44 m (145 ft)
- Shore length^{1}: 27.2 km (16.9 mi)
- Surface elevation: 142 m (466 ft)
- ^{1} Shore length is not a well-defined measure.

Loch Tummel (Scottish Gaelic: Loch Teimheil) is a long, narrow loch, seven kilometres (4 1/2 miles) northwest of Pitlochry in the council area of Perth and Kinross, Scotland. It is fed and drained by the River Tummel, which flows into the River Tay about 13 km (8 mi) south-east of the Clunie Dam at the loch's eastern end.

The loch is traversed by roads to both north and south. Along the northern side the road is numbered as the B8019, and runs from the Pass of Killiecrankie on the A9 in the east to Tummel Bridge at the head of the loch. The road on the southern side is unclassified, and meets the A9 further south, near to Pitlochry.

The loch gives its name to the Loch Tummel National Scenic Area (NSA), one of 40 such areas in Scotland, which are defined so as to identify areas of exceptional scenery and to ensure its protection by restricting certain forms of development. The Loch Tummel Lyon NSA covers 9,013 hectares (22,272 acres), all of which lies within Perth and Kinross. The NSA covers the hills surrounding the loch, and extends along the River Tummel to also take in the area surrounding the Pass of Killiecrankie on the River Garry.

== Leisure and tourism ==
Loch Tummel is popular with anglers who fish for brown trout and pike. Fishing is managed by the Loch Rannoch Conservation Association, who issue permits and control catches. Loch Tummel Sailing Club is based at Foss on the south west shore of the loch. The loch is also very popular with campers during the spring and summer. The roads on either side of the loch both offer splendid views of the surrounding countryside, especially from the well-known 'Queen's View' from the north shore, which was made famous by Queen Victoria in 1866. This viewpoint offers a magnificent vista over the loch with Schiehallion in the background. It is also claimed that the view was originally named after Queen Isabel, wife of Robert the Bruce, who is said to have hidden in the nearby woods after the Bruce's defeat at the Battle of Methven in 1306.

Areas of forestry around Loch Tummel owned by Forestry and Land Scotland (FLS) form part of the Tay Forest Park, a network of FLS forests spread across the Highland parts of Perthshire that are managed to provide walks and amenities for visitors.

== Nature and conservation ==
Loch Tummel National Scenic Area
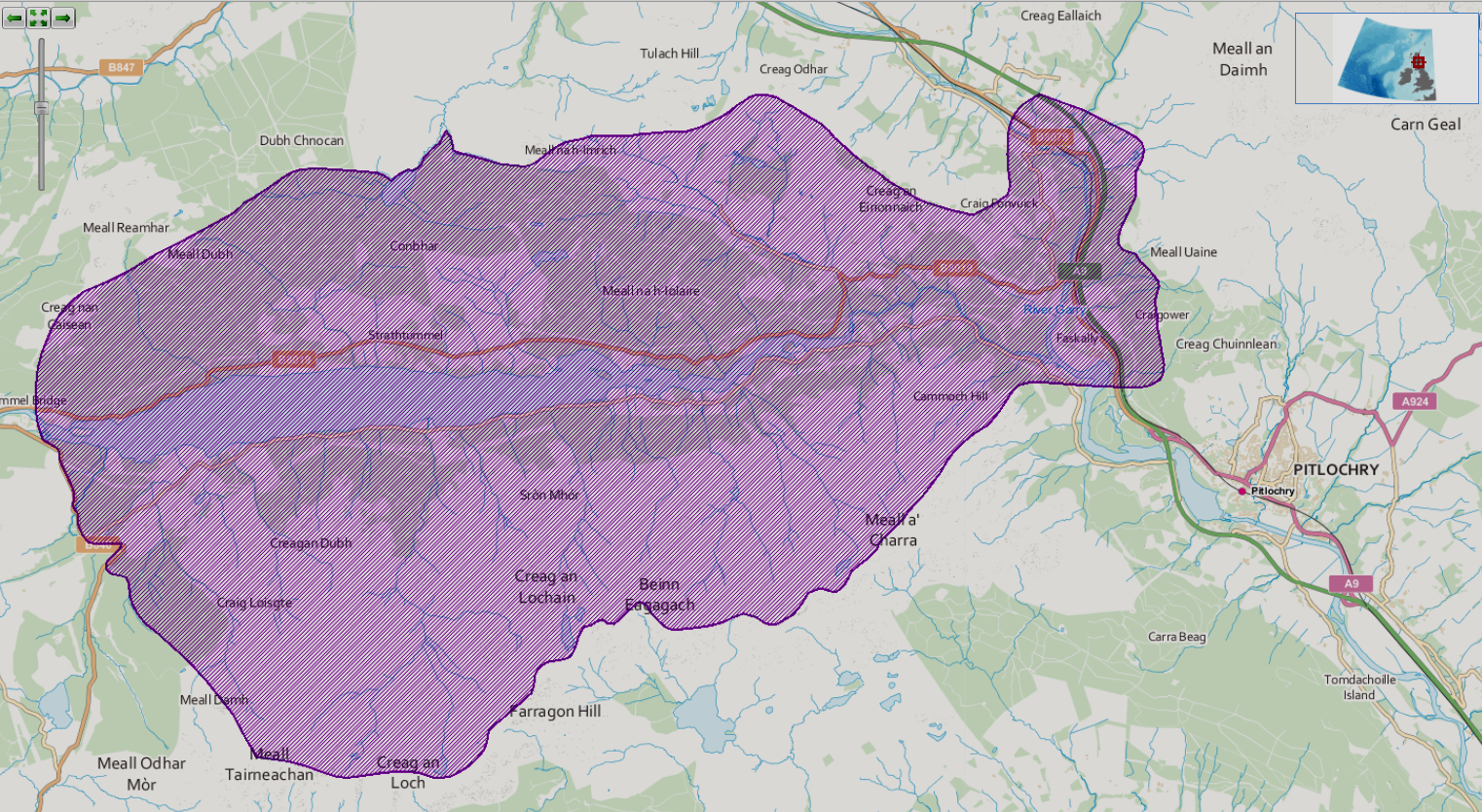
- A map showing the extent of the Loch Tummel National Scenic Area.
- Location: 56°42′40″N 3°55′40″W
- Area: 90.1 km^{2} (34.8 sq mi)
- Established: 1981
- Governing body: NatureScot

The River Tummel is a tributary of the River Tay, and Loch Tummel is included as part of the River Tay Special Area of Conservation. The designation notes the river system's importance for salmon, otters, brook lampreys, river lampreys and sea lampreys. Brown trout and pike are also present in the loch.

The woods to the north of the loch are home to a number of protected species, including capercaillie, black grouse, red squirrel, pearl-bordered fritillary and juniper.

== Hydro-electricity ==
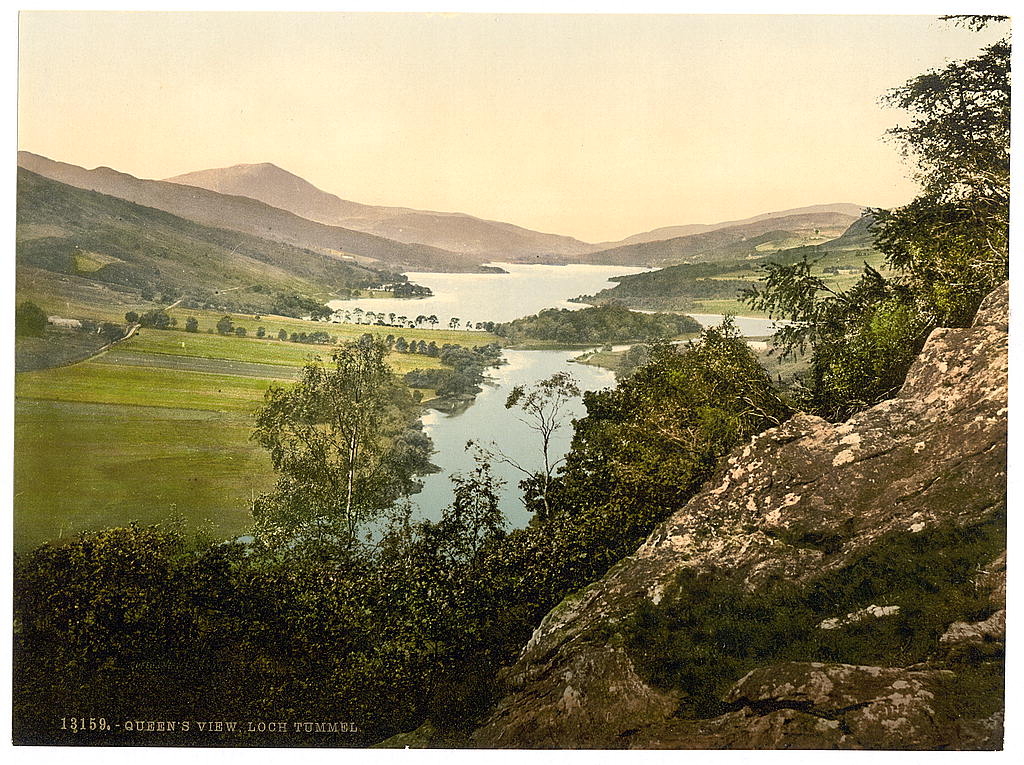
Loch Tummel from the Queen's View in about 1895. Note the lower water level when compared to the modern image.

Loch Tummel became part of the Tummel Hydro-Electric Power Scheme when the Clunie Dam was constructed by Wimpey Construction at its eastern end in 1950, raising the water level by 4.5 m (15 ft). Prior to this the loch, which is now approximately 11 km (7 mi) long and just under 0 km (1 mi) wide was much smaller, being 4.4 km (2 3/4 mi) long and 0.8 km (1/2 mi) wide.

Water from Loch Tummel is diverted to Loch Faskally, running via Clunie power station, which has a vertical head of 53 m (174 ft) and a total generating capacity of 61 MW. There is also a power station at Tummel Bridge at the western end of the loch that takes water from Dunalastair reservoir below Loch Rannoch, and discharges into Loch Tummel: this station has a vertical head of 53 m (174 ft) and a total generating capacity of 34 MW.

== Historical sites ==
The northern side of the loch has many archeological sites, including an Iron Age ring fort, abandoned townships, and the remains of Pictish fortified villages. This area also includes the standing stones of Clachan Aoraidh, located at the head of Glen Fincastle in the Allean Forest. Fincastle House, a 17th-century Category A listed building, sits at the eastern end of the strath.

The raising of the loch for hydroelectricity led to the drowning of an artificial island of a type known as a crannog lying off Port an Eilean on the northern side of the loch. The island is now 3 m underwater, and was investigated by the Scottish Trust for Underwater Archaeology and Perth & Kinross Heritage Trust in 2004. A well-made flagstone floor and a flight of steps that led down a distance of 2 m to the loch bed were found. Analysis of one of the timbers found on the site revealed that it dated from around 1840.

Above the head of the loch, there are two bridges over the River Tummel at Tummel Bridge. The original humpbacked bridge was built by General Wade in about 1734 as part of his construction of some 240 miles (390 km) of roads and 30 bridges in Scotland between 1725 and 1737. A modern replacement alongside Wade's bridge carries the traffic from Aberfeldy on the B846 road. The historic drove road of the Road to the Isles leaves Wade's military road at Tummel Bridge, from where it heads west into Lochaber, and Tummel is one of the places mentioned in the Scottish folk song named after the road.

== See also ==
- List of reservoirs and dams in the United Kingdom
