= Tay Forest Park =

Park in Perth and Kinross, Scotland, UK

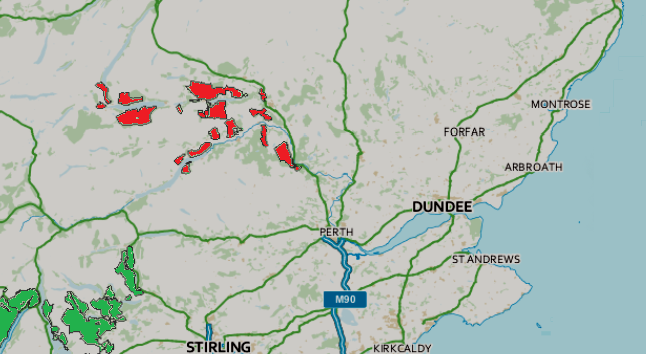
- The location of the Tay Forest Park, shown in red

- Location within Perth and Kinross Location within Scotland
- Interactive map of Tay Forest Park

Geography
- Location: Perth and Kinross, Scotland
- Coordinates: 56.5837412°N 3.664917°W

Tay Forest Park is a forest park in the council area of Perth and Kinross in Scotland. It consists of a network of forests managed by Forestry and Land Scotland (FLS) that are spread across the Highland parts of Perthshire, and covers 194 km^{2} (75 sq mi) in total. The park contains a series of disparate woods that are managed for multiple benefits, with an emphasis on recreation facilities for visitors.

The park's main visitor centre is at Queen's View, near Loch Tummel, where there is a café, gift shop and interpretative displays. Other smaller centres are located at the following locations:

- Allean, also close to Loch Tummel
- Faskally, between Pitlochry and Killiecrankie
- Carie on the south side of Loch Rannoch
- Grandtully, between Aberfeldy and Ballinluig
- Weem, north of Aberfeldy
- Drummond Hill on the north side of Loch Tay
- Craigvinean, near Dunkeld and Birnam

At each location there is a car park and waymarked trails for visitors. Some of the sites have more facilities, such as toilets.

== Gallery ==
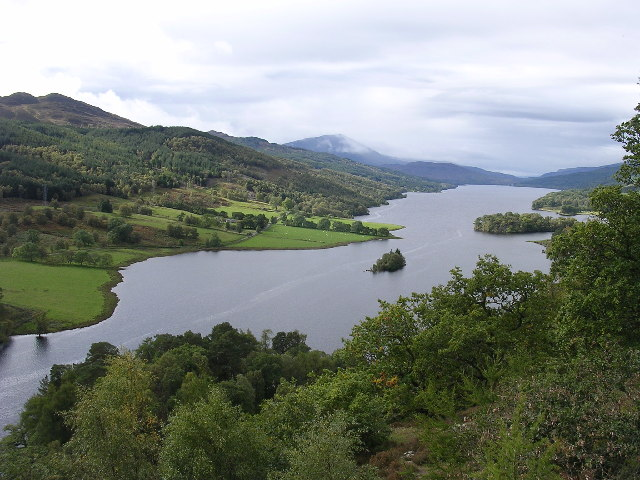
Queen's View, Loch Tummel
