= Clan Robertson =

Scottish clan

Clan Donnachaidh
- Clann Donnchaidh
- Crest: Dexter hand holding up an imperial crown Proper
- Motto: Virtutis gloria merces (Glory is the reward of valour)
- War cry: Garg 'nuair dhùisgear (Fierce when roused)

Profile
- Region: Highlands
- District: Struan, Perthshire
- Plant badge: bracken
- Pipe music: Teachd Chlann Dhonnchaidh (Coming of the Duncans) or Teachd Chlann Donnachaidh (The Clan Donnachie has arrived).

Chief
- Gilbert Robertson of Struan
- The 23rd Chief of Clan Donnachaidh (Mac Dhonnchaidh)
- Historic seat: Mount Alexander
Septs of Clan Donnachaidh
Collier, Colyear, Conlow
Connachie, Dobbie
Dobieson, Dobie Dobinson,Dobson
Donachie, Donica, Donnachie,Duncan, Duncanson, Dunkeson, Dunnachie, Inches, MacConachie, MacConlogue, MacConnichie, MacDonachie, MacInroy, MacIver, MacIvor, MacLagan, MacLaggan, MacRob, MacRobb, MacRobbie, MacRobert, MacRobie, MacWilliam, McConnachie, [McRobie, Robb, Robbie, Roberts, Roberson, Robison, Robinson, Robson, Roy, Stark, Tannoch (Tanner, Tonner), Tannochy, Hart,
Note that several of the above are merely anglicised variants of the Scottish Gaelic MacDhonnchaidh or literal translations into English of the same (Duncan, Duncanson, etc).
Clan branches
Robertson of Struan (chiefs)
Robertson of Lude (principal cadets).
Robertson of Auchleeks.
Robertson of Faskally.
Robertson of Inches.
Robertson of Kindeace.
Robertson of Kinlochmouidart.
Allied clans
Clan MacGregor
Rival clans
Clan Ogilvy
Clan MacDougall

Clan Robertson, correctly known as Clan Donnachaidh (Duncan) (Scottish Gaelic: Clann Dhonnchaidh) ([ˈkʰl̪ˠãũn̪ˠ ˈɣɔn̪ˠɔxɪ]) is a Scottish clan. The principal surnames of the clan are Robertson, Reid and Duncan but there are also many other septs.

== History ==
=== Origins ===
There are two main theories as to the origins of the Clan:

1. That the founder of the clan, Donn(a)chadh (Duncan) was the second son of Angus MacDonald, Lord of the Isles.
2. That the Robertsons are lineal descendants of the Celtic Earls of Atholl, whose progenitor was King Duncan I (Donnchadh in Scottish Gaelic). The Collins Scottish Clan & Family Encyclopedia supports this theory.

=== Wars of Scottish Independence ===
The clan's first recognised chief, Donnchadh Reamhar, "Stout Duncan", son of Andrew de Atholia (Latin "Andrew of Atholl"), was a minor land-owner and leader of a kin-group around Dunkeld, Highland Perthshire, and as legend has it, an enthusiastic and faithful supporter of Robert I (king 1306–29 aka Robert the Bruce) during the Wars of Scottish Independence; he is believed to have looked after King Robert after the Battle of Methven in 1306. The clan asserts that Stout Duncan's relatives and followers (not yet known as Robertsons) supported Robert the Bruce at the Battle of Bannockburn in 1314. His descendants became known (in English or Scots) as the Duncansons, or Gaelic Clann Dhonnchaidh, "Children of Duncan". Duncan is believed to have been killed at the Battle of Neville's Cross and was succeeded by Robert, from whom the Clan Robertson takes its name. Robert's brother, Patrick, was the ancestor of the Robertsons of Lude who were the principal cadet branch.

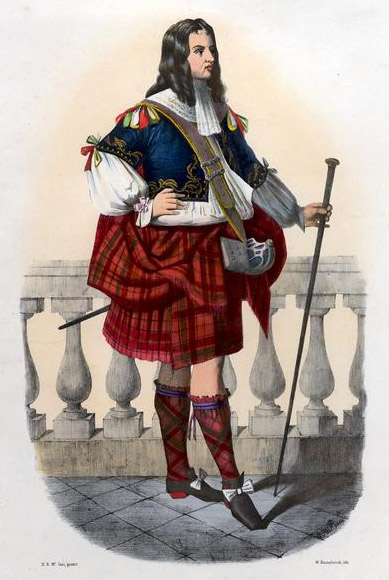
"Robertson". Romanticised Victorian depiction of a member of the clan in a late 17th-century dress by R. R. McIan, from The Clans of the Scottish Highlands, published in 1845.

=== 14th- and 15th-century clan conflicts ===
In 1394 a clan battle took place between Clann Dhonnchaidh, Clan Lindsay and involving Clan Ogilvy, who were the hereditary sheriffs of Angus, during a cattle raid on Angus. Sir Walter Ogilvy was slain at this battle. Clandonoquhy had rather a reputation as raiders and feuders in late medieval Scotland, though the chiefs seem always to have been loyal to the Bruce and Stewart royal dynasties.

Robert Riabhach ("Grizzled") Duncanson, 4th Chief of Clann Dhonnchaidh, was a strong supporter of King James I (1406–1437) and was incensed by his murder at the Blackfriars Dominican Friary in Perth. He tracked down and captured two of the regicides, Sir Robert Graham and the King's uncle Walter Stewart, Earl of Atholl, as they hid above Invervack in Atholl, and turned them over to the Crown. They were tortured to death in the Grassmarket in Edinburgh on the orders of the Regent, James I's widow, Joan Beaufort (d. 1445). The Collins Scottish Clan & Family Encyclopedia states that they were put to death with considerable savagery. The Robertson crest badge of a right hand upholding an imperial crown was awarded by James II (1437–60) to the 4th chief on 15 August 1451 as a reward for capturing his father's assassins. The highly unusual third supporter (below the shield) on the Robertson coat of arms, of a "savage man in chains" is in reference to the capture of Graham. It is in honour of Robert Riabhach that his descendants took the name Robertson. James II also erected the clan lands into the Barony of Struan, which formerly took in extensive lands in Highland Perthshire, notably in Glen Errochty, the north and south banks of Loch Tay and the area surrounding Loch Rannoch. None of these lands are any longer in the possession of the clan.

Robert Riabhach or Riach died in 1460 from wounds received in battle. The chiefship then passed to his eldest son, Alexander. The Clan Robertson then feuded with the Clan Stewart of Atholl. William Robertson, the sixth chief was killed trying to recover lands that had been seized by the Stewarts of Atholl. The eighth chief of Clan Robertson was murdered and his brother inherited the estate.

Struan (Gaelic Sruthan, "streams"), is a parish church, of early Christian origin and dedicated to St. Fillan, at the confluence of the Errochty Water and Garry rivers. Many of the medieval chiefs were buried in this church (although individual monuments have unfortunately not survived). The present building was built in the early 19th century, but the foundations of its predecessor can be traced in the churchyard. Donnchadh Reamhar is, however, said to have been buried in the parish church of Dull, near Aberfeldy. Recent excavations by members of the Clan Donnachaidh Society within the now redundant church of Dull (Gaelic Dul, "meadow", "haugh") failed to find evidence of this specific burial, although others were uncovered, along with early medieval carved stones. Recent generations of chiefs have been buried in a family vault in the grounds of the estate of Dunalastair, near Kinloch Rannoch.

=== 17th century and Civil War ===
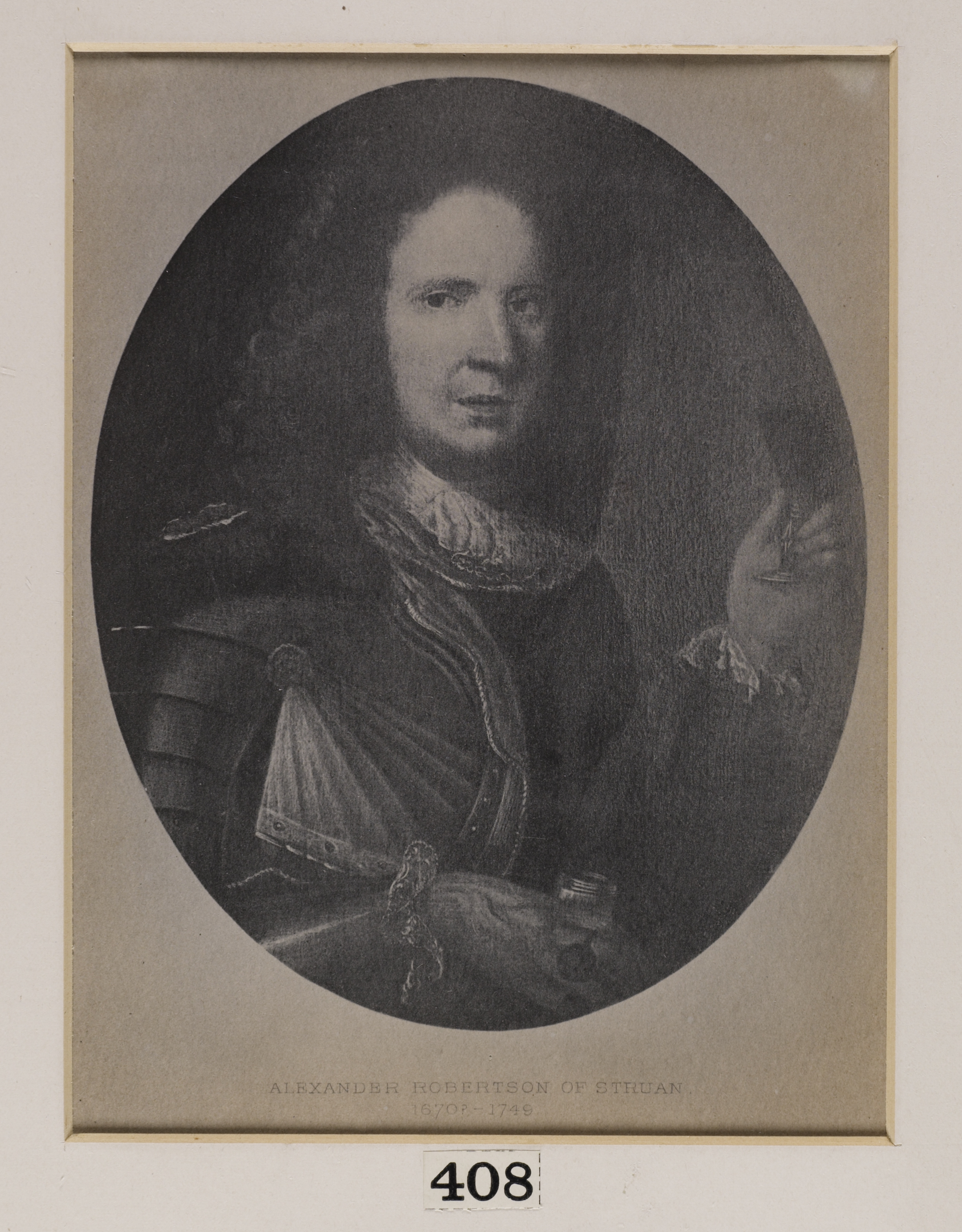
Alexander Robertson, 13th chief of Clan Robertson who supported the Jacobite risings of 1689 and 1715

Under Alexander Robertson, 12th chief, the clan is said to have supported Montrose in all of his battles during the Scottish Civil War. During this time, the main Robertson castle at Invervack, near the present Clan museum, was burned by Cromwell's forces, and many family records were lost. The Clan Robertson played a major part in the fighting at the Battle of Inverlochy (1645) in support of the royalist, James Graham, 1st Marquis of Montrose, where they put the king's enemies to flight. Alexander Robertson of Lude fought for Charles I of Scotland at the Battle of Tippermuir and as a result Lude was burned by Cromwell's forces in retaliation.

In 1653 the Earl of Glencairn was in Rannoch looking for support for Charles II. He raised the Clan MacGregor from the Isle of Rannoch and Alexander Robertson led his men from Fea Corrie. Both forces met above Annat and marched up the old path to Loch Garry. However, the leaders reportedly quarrelled so much among themselves that Cromwell's General, George Monk had little difficulty in winning the ensuing Battle of Dalnaspidal.

Alexander Robertson, 13th chief (b. 1668) joined the Jacobite rising of 1689 and was taken prisoner a few weeks after the Jacobite defeat at the Battle of Dunkeld. After being released he went to live in France for thirteen years where he served for some time in the French army. He returned to Scotland in 1703.

=== 18th century and Jacobite uprisings ===
Alexander Robertson, 13th chief, led 500 men of Clan Robertson in support of the Earl of Mar at the Battle of Sheriffmuir in 1715. He was captured, but later rescued and he took refuge in France. General Wade's report on the Highlands in 1724, estimated the clan strength at 800 men. The fighting force of Clan Donnachaidh was estimated at 700 men in 1745.

After the defeat of the Jacobite rising of 1745 the Robertson lands became part of the Forfeited Estates, although most were returned to the then chief, another Alexander Robertson, in 1784, after it became clear that the Central Highlands were wholly pacified.

Two of the most notorious and well documented Highland Clearances occurred on the Robertson clan land of Strathcarron:

1. In 1845, the Glencalvie or Croick clearance, executed by the factor James Gillander on behalf of William Robertson, sixth laird of Kindeace.
2. In 1854, the Greenyards clearance, sometimes known as the Massacre of the Rosses. This was also carried out by James Gillander on behalf of Major Charles Robertson—son of William.

The Clearances upon the Clan Robertson lands are also important to the history of Scottish Gaelic literature.

In Sutherland, Eòghainn MacDhonnchaidh (Ewan Robertson, (1842–1895) of Tongue was called "the Bard of the Clearances"; is most famous for his song Mo mhallachd aig na caoraich mhòr ("My curses upon the big [Blackface and/or Cheviot, introduced from England] sheep") mocking, among others, the Duchess of Sutherland and Patrick Sellar. The song has been recorded by notable singers Julie Fowlis and Kathleen MacInnes. There is a monument to Robertson in Tongue.

A similar poem in Canadian Gaelic attacks James Gillanders of Highfield Cottage near Dingwall, who was the Factor for the estate of Major Charles Robertson of Kincardine. As his employer was then serving with the British Army in Australia, Gillanders was the person most responsible for the mass evictions staged at Glencalvie, Ross-shire in 1845. The Gaelic-language poem denouncing Gillanders for the brutality of the evictions was later submitted anonymously to Pàdraig MacNeacail, the editor of the column in Gaelic in which the poem was published in the Antigonish, Nova Scotia newspaper The Casket. The poem, which is believed to draw upon eyewitness accounts, is believed to be the only Gaelic language source relating to the evictions in Glencalvie.

Only the family vault at Dunalastair is still in the possession of the family of Struan; however, many modern properties have been added to the clan land. The title Baron of Struan is still transferred through Dunalastair.

== Clan castles ==
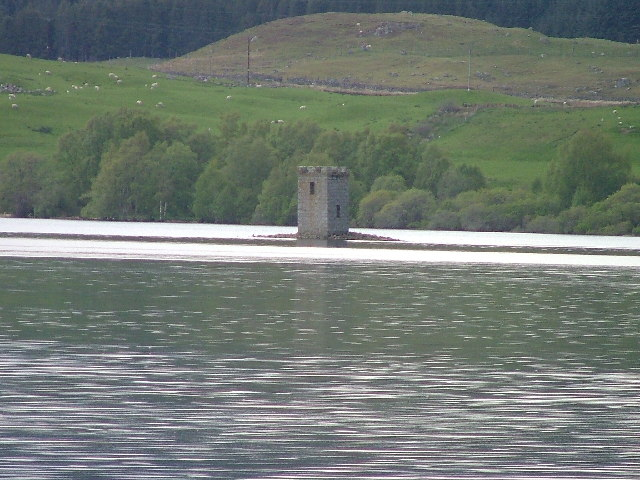
Eilean nam Faoilaig was once held by the Robertsons

- Mount Alexander was among the original seats of the chiefs of Clan Robertson. The castle was eventually replaced by Dall House. Despite common misconception, the present ruin at Dunalistair has absolutely no historical connection to Clan Donnachaidh. The previous house was sold by the then chief to General John Macdonald of Dalchosnie in 1853 He then built the, now runied, house on the site.
- The original seat was at Invervack, and was lost in the Civil war
- Lude Castle belonged to the Clan Robertson from at least the 17th century but was torched by the forces of Oliver Cromwell in 1650 after Alexander Robertson of Lude had fought on the side of James Graham, 1st Marquess of Montrose at the Battle of Tippermuir in 1644.
- Auchleeks Castle was held by the Clan Robertson from the 1530s but was later replaced by a mansion. They sold the property in 1962 and the garden is occasionally open to the public.
- Eilean nam Faoilaig, near Kinloch Rannoch, Perthshire, is the site of a castle on an island that was held by the Robertsons of Struan and was used as both a refuge and a prison.

== Tartans ==
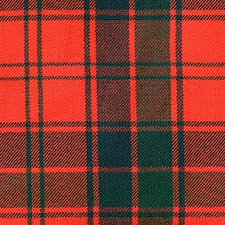
Robertson red tartan

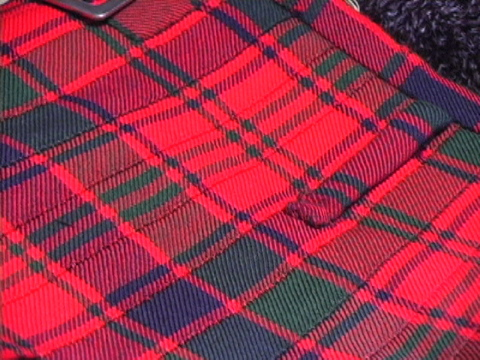
Detail of a Robertson red kilt

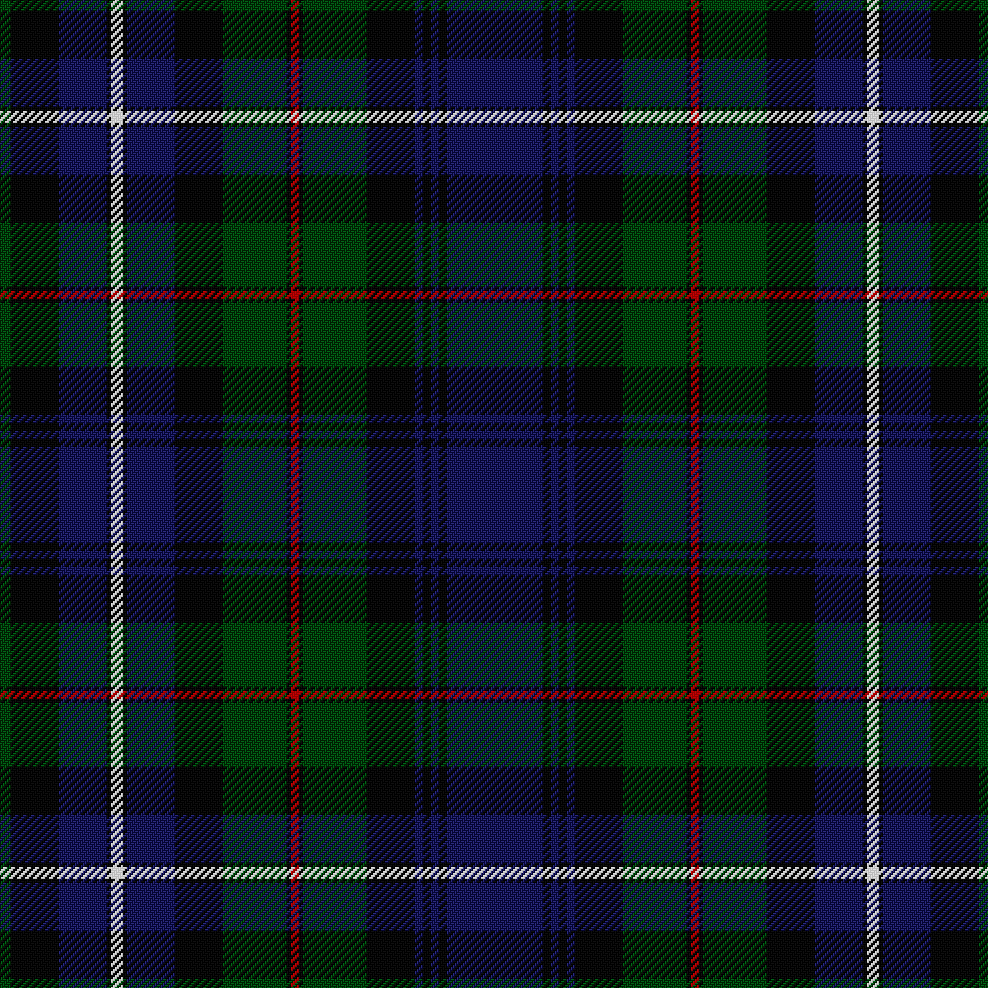
Robertson hunting tartan, in the "modern" colour palette; originally the military tartan of the Loyal Clan Donnachie Volunteers

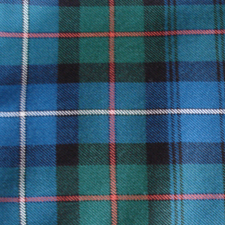
Robertson hunting in "ancient" colour palette (closeup)

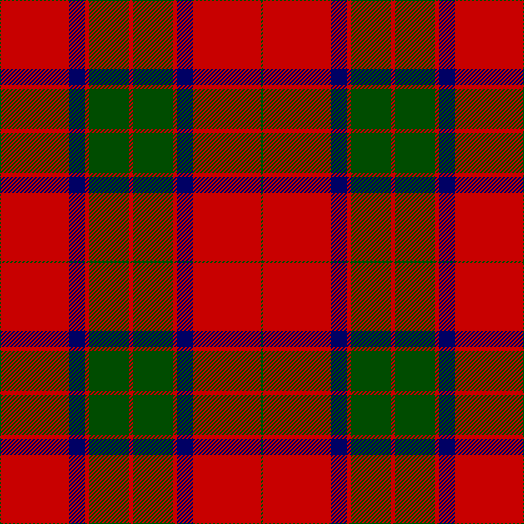
"Clandonoquhay" tartan, as published in 1842 in the Vestiarium Scoticum

== Gaelic names ==
- MacDhonnchaidh (surname, 'son of Duncan')
- MacRaibeirt (surname, 'son of Robert')
- Robasdan (surname – used when following a first name)
- An Robasdanach (surname, 'the Robertson' – used on its own, without a first name)
- Clann MhicDhonnchaidh / Clann 'IcDhonnchaidh (collective – 'Clan Robertson')
- Clann Dhonnchaidh (collective)
- Na Robasdanaich (collective) – the Robertsons as a whole.

Note: the common spelling often appears with an "a" after the double nn of Dhonnchaidh, but this is not correct (though it does reflect the Gaelic insertion of an epenthetic vowel in pronunciation). Cf. the anglicised surname MacConnochie (and variants). "MacDhonnchaidh" and derivatives are usually used on the mainland, "Robasdan" and derivatives on the islands.

== Branches ==
- Robertson of Auchleeks.
- Robertson of Faskally.
- Robertson of Inches.
- Robertson of Kindeace.
- Robertson of Kinlochmouidart.
- Robertson of Lude.
- Robertson of Struan.

== Septs ==
The main surname used by the Clan is Robertson, which is also used by the present chief's family, though other names are associated with the clan. These may include:

- Barr
- Collier
- Colyear
- Conlow
- Connachie
- Dobbie
- Dobie
- Dobieson
- Dobinson
- Dobson
- Donachie
- Donnachie
- Donica
- Donohoe
- Duncan
- Duncanson
- Dunkeson
- Dunnachie
- Dunshea
- Green
- Inches
- MacConachie
- MacConnachie
- MacConlogue
- MacConnichie
- MacDonachie
- MacGlashan
- MacInroy
- MacIver
- MacIvor
- MacLagan
- MacLaggan
- MacRob
- MacRobb
- MacRobbie
- MacRobert
- MacRobie
- MacWilliam
- McDonnough
- McConnachie
- McConnico
- McConochie
- McConnochie
- McConaghie
- McInroy
- McRobie
- Reed
- Reid
- Robb
- Robbie
- Roberts
- Robison
- Robinson
- Roberson
- Robson
- Roy
- Stark
- Tannoch
- Tannochy
- Hart

Note that several of the above are merely anglicised variants of the Scots Gaelic MacDhònnchaidh or literal translations into English of the same (Duncan, Duncanson, etc.).

== Clan profile ==
- Motto: Virtutis gloria merces ('Glory is the reward of valour')
- Slogan: Garg 'nuair dhùisgear ('Fierce when Roused')
- Crest: A dexter hand holding up an imperial crown, all proper
- Badge: Bracken (the clan had lands on the southern side of Loch Rannoch – Gaelic Loch Raineach, 'Loch of Bracken')
- Pipe music:
  - Salute: Fàilte Thighearna Sruthain (Struan Robertson's Salute or Laird of Struan's Salute)
  - Gathering: Thàinig Clann Dhònnchaidh (The Robertsons Are Come)
  - March: Till an Crodh Dhònnchadh (Turn the Cattle, Dònnchadh); Riobain Gorm (Blue Ribbon); Teachd Chlann Dhònnchaidh (Coming of the Robertsons)
  - Lament: Cumha Sruthain (Lament for Robertson of Struan)
- Clan chief: Alexander Gilbert Haldane Robertson of Struan, 24th Chief of Clan Robertson, 28th of Struan (styled Struan Robertson)
