= John McConnico =

American photographer

John McConnico is an American Pulitzer Prize and World Press Photo award-winning photojournalist.

== Personal ==
McConnico resides in Panama city, Panama. He speaks English, French, and Spanish.

== Career ==
McConnico has spent the last 25 years as a wire service photographer and photo editor. He has worked in over 90 different countries. Much of his work focuses on photo essays in Europe, Africa, and Asia. Some of his clients include the New York Times, UNICEF, Conde Nast, and the Associated Press.
