= Alexander Robertson of Struan =

Scottish Jacobite and clan chief

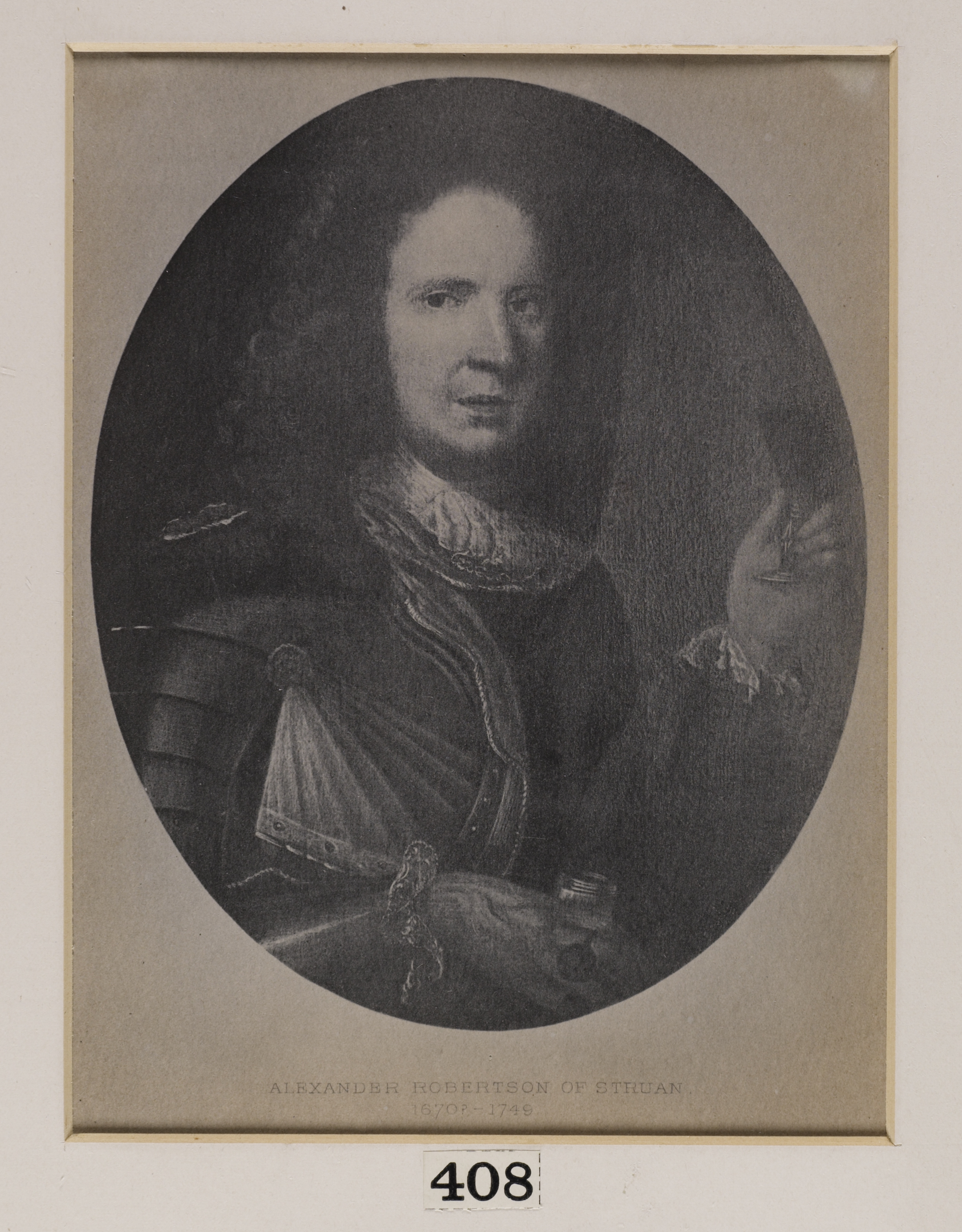
Alexander Robertson of Struan, by an unknown artist.

Alexander Robertson of Struan (c. 1670 – 18 April 1749), 13th Chief of Clan Robertson, was a Scottish Jacobite soldier and poet, notable for participating in three Jacobite risings.

== Biography ==
Robertson was the younger son of another Alexander Robertson, 11th Chief of Clan Robertson, who died in 1687 and was succeeded by his oldest son, Robert. Robertson succeeded his elder brother as clan chief in 1688. He was a student at the University of St Andrews, but left his studies to participate in the Jacobite rising of 1689 in the army of Viscount Dundee after receiving a commission from James II. Robertson was taken prisoner by Government forces a few weeks after the Battle of Dunkeld, but was released or escaped later that year. He was attainted in 1690 and followed James II into exile in France at Château de Saint-Germain-en-Laye.

Robertson remained at the Jacobite court, spending some time in the French Royal Army, before returning to Scotland in 1703 having obtained a remission. However, the remission was never made official and the forfeiture of 1690 was never legally repealed. in Scotland he became deeply involved in Jacobite plotting, training men for a new rising and in constant communication with the Jacobite court. He strongly opposed the Treaty of Union between England and Scotland in 1707.

In 1715, he led 500 of his clansmen in the Jacobite rising of that year and participated in the Battle of Sheriffmuir, but was captured for a second time in early 1716. He was rescued by Jacobite supporters and escaped to the Netherlands before returning to France, where he served as a colonel in the Scots brigade. In 1725 he was created a baronet in the Jacobite peerage by James Francis Edward Stuart. Robertson was briefly in Scotland in 1726. He visited again in 1731, when he successfully gained remission for his life and settled again on the Robertson estate.

Robertson rallied his clan to join the Jacobite rising of 1745 in support of Prince Charles. Despite his age, he travelled to meet Prince Charles at Dalnacardoch with 200 of his clansmen and was given the honorary commission of major-general. He was present with Clan Robertson at the Battle of Prestonpans in September 1745, after which he seized the carriage and possessions of General Sir John Cope as a victory prize. Being too infirm, he did not join the Jacobite advance into England. Following the defeat of the Jacobite rising in 1746, his tower house at Dunalastair was burnt down by government soldiers and his estates were forfeited. Much of the Robertson land was returned to the clan in 1784. Robertson died on 18 April 1749; he never married and was succeeded as clan chief by a relation. His nearest heir was Colonel Duncan Robertson of Drumachine, who was dispossessed as a Jacobite and whose son Alexander eventually received the estate in 1784.

After his death, a collection of various poems that he had written throughout his life was collated into one book, which was published in 1752. His portrait is in the collection of the National Galleries of Scotland.
