= River Tummel =

River in Perth and Kinross, Scotland

- River Tummel

- Location within Scotland
- Native name: Uisge Theimheil (Scottish Gaelic)

Location
- Country: Scotland
- County: Perth and Kinross

Physical characteristics
- Source
  - location: Loch Rannoch
  - coordinates: 56°38′30″N 3°40′00″W
- Mouth: River Tay
- Length: 58 m (190 ft)

The River Tummel (Scottish Gaelic: Uisge Theimheil) is a river in Perth and Kinross, Scotland. Water from the Tummel is used in the Tummel hydro-electric power scheme, operated by SSE.

As a tributary of the River Tay, the Tummel is included as part of the River Tay Special Area of Conservation. The designation notes the river system's importance for salmon, otters, brook lampreys, river lampreys and sea lampreys.

== Description ==
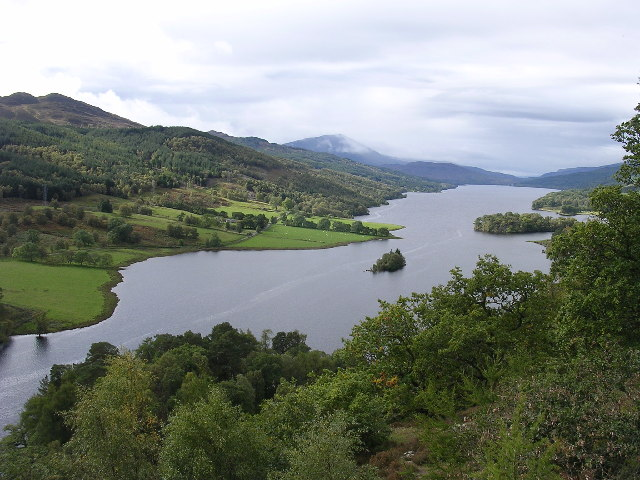
The 'Queen's View', Loch Tummel.

Discharging from Loch Rannoch, it flows east to a point near the Falls of Tummel, where it bends to the southeast, a direction which it maintains until it falls into the River Tay, just below Logierait, after a course of 58 miles (93 km) from its source in Stob Ghabbar (3,565 ft (1,087 m)). Its only considerable affluent is the Garry, 24 miles (39 km) long, an impetuous river which issues from Loch Garry (2.5 mi (4.0 km) and 1,334 ft (407 m) above sea level). Some 2 miles from its outlet from Loch Rannoch the river expands into Dunalastair Water (or Dunalastair Reservoir), a man made loch formed by a weir, part of the Tummel Hydro Electric power scheme. About midway in its course the Tummel expands into Loch Tummel, between which and the confluence with the Garry occur the Pass and Falls of the Tummel, which are rather in the nature of rapids, the descent altogether amounting to 15 ft (4.6 m). Loch Tummel was previously 4.43 km (2.75 mi) long and 39 m (128 ft) deep, but with the construction of the Clunie Dam in 1950, the water level was raised by 4.5 metres, and Loch Tummel is now approximately 11 km (7 mi) long.

The scenery throughout this reach is most picturesque, culminating at the point above the eastern extremity of the loch, known as the "Queen's View" (Queen Victoria made the view famous in 1866, although it is said to have been named after Queen Isabel, wife of Robert the Bruce). The chief places of interest on the river are Kinloch Rannoch; Dunalastair, a rocky hill in well-wooded grounds, the embellishment of which was largely due to Alexander Robertson of Struan, the Jacobite and poet, from whom the spot takes its name (the stronghold of Alexander); Foss; Faskally House (beautifully situated on the left bank); Pitlochry; and Ballinluig.

The ancient name of the river, in its upper reaches at least, was the Dubhag.
