= Catchwater =

Runoff catching or channeling device

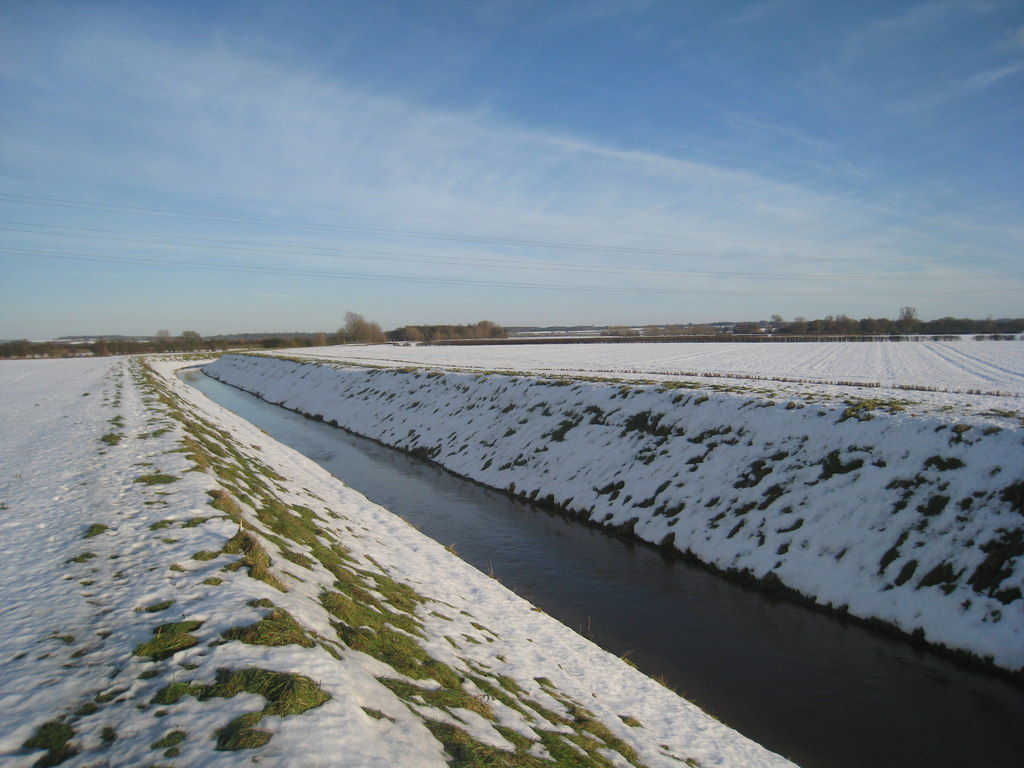
A village catchwater drain

A catchwater device is a large-scale man-made device for catching surface runoff from hills and the sky from precipitation by channeling it to reservoirs for commercial and domestic use later. Freshwater is a scarce natural resource due to pollution, droughts, and overpopulation. Catchwater is a sustainable mechanism to increase freshwater in areas facing droughts or polluted waterways. A catchwater drain decreases the velocity of storm-water runoff to reduce and prevent erosion and other environmental problems.

== Types ==
=== Catchwater drains ===
Catchwater drains may take the form of concrete canals, such as in Hong Kong, where there are many. Alternatively, they may take the form of a large concrete sheet, smothering a hill, and preventing rainfall from entering the rock strata, with a smaller channeling system for transport of the water to the storage tank - this latter system is in operation in Gibraltar. In Hong Kong there are approximately 120 kilometres (75 mi) of concrete channels, used as gutters built along hillsides in order to direct freshwater runoff into reservoirs for local water consumption. These catchwaters can overflow, causing dangerous hazards, erosive streams and blockages.

=== Earthship drains ===
An earthship drain is water that is collected from impervious surfaces that are channeled into cisterns. A cistern is a reservoir located underground. The water within these underground reservoirs is heated by the sun. The water that is stored is used in domestic ways for washing dishes and bathing. Once water is used it is cycled and filtered in a module to be reused again.

=== Rain barrels ===
Rainwater tanks, also known as rain barrels in North America, are used to collect runoff coming from precipitation to prevent contamination from entering waterways. The only use of water from rain barrels is used for commercial use such as gardening and agriculture. Rain barrels are large containers that are connected to buildings through a gutter system which catches runoff from roofs. Many households use rain barrels as a substitute for a to reduce the amount of water they waste for recreational activities.

=== Rain gardens ===
A Rain garden is another man-made device created by digging a hole in an area and planting a garden with a variety of vegetation. The vegetation helps catch storm-water runoff, then filters the water to reduce the pollutants before the water reenters the hydrology cycle. Rain gardens are used to decrease the speed of water by capturing the water, so it does not become surface runoff through infiltrating the soil.

== Gallery ==
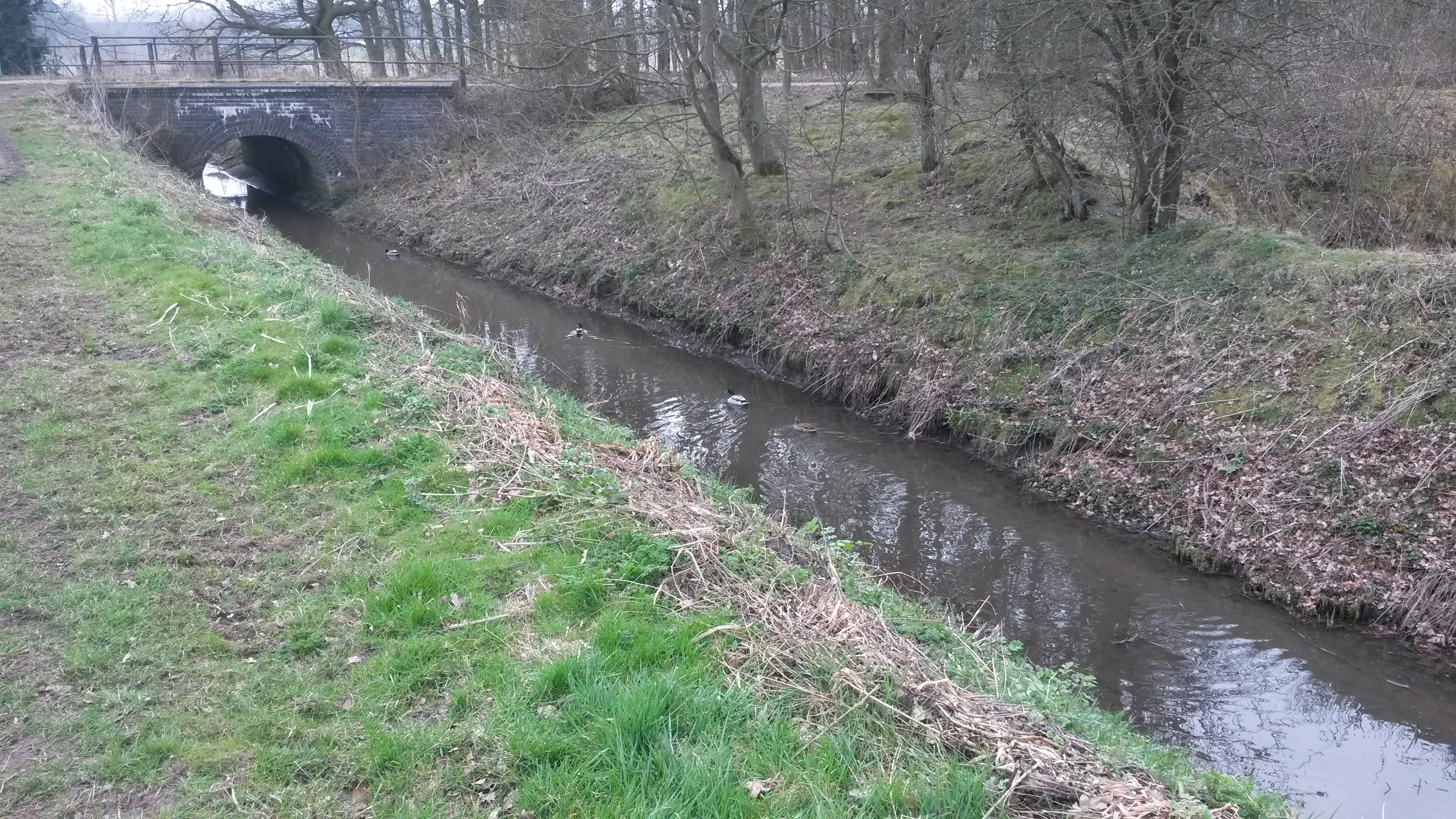
Catchwater drain

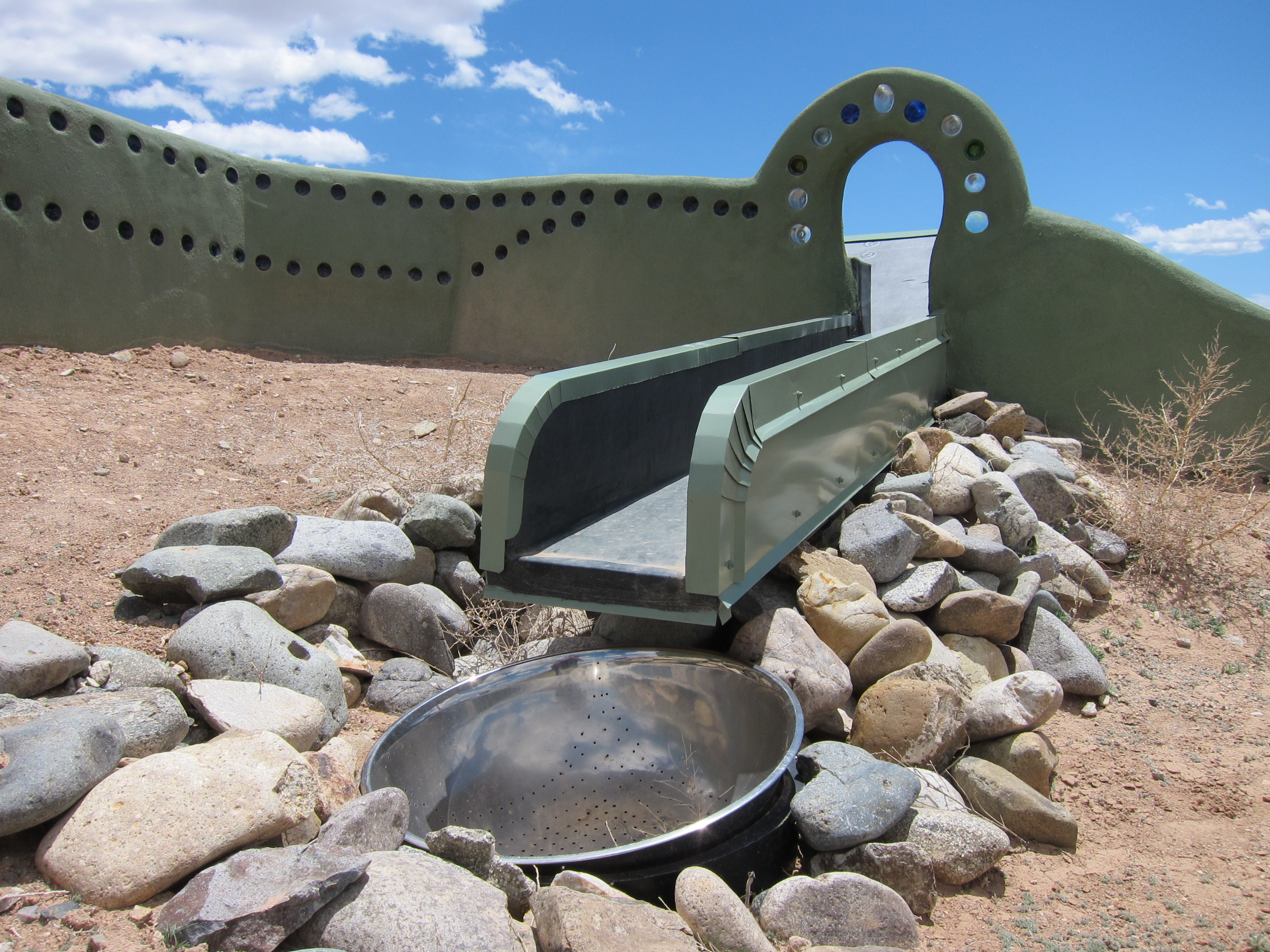
Earthship water capture system

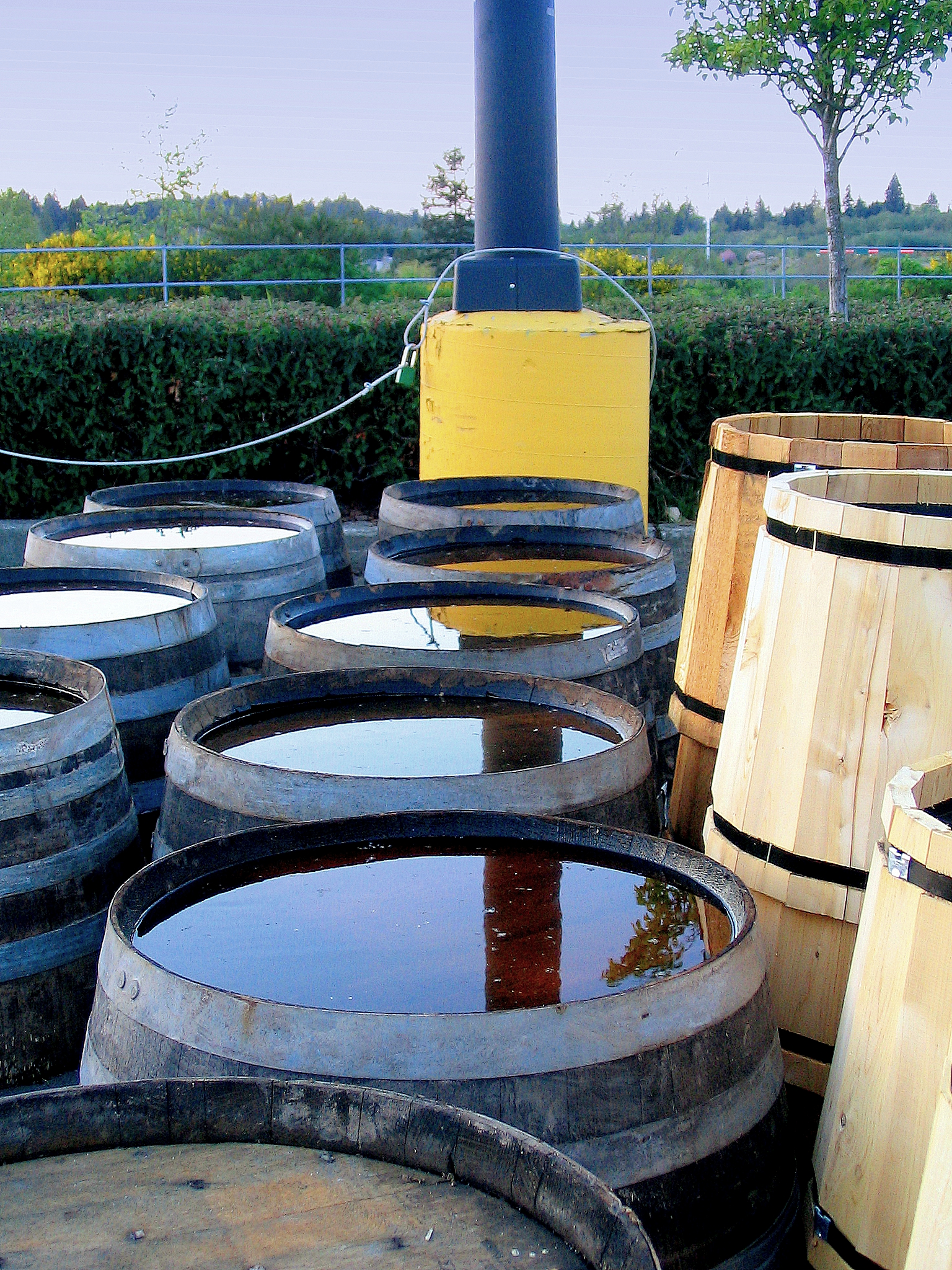
Rain barrels

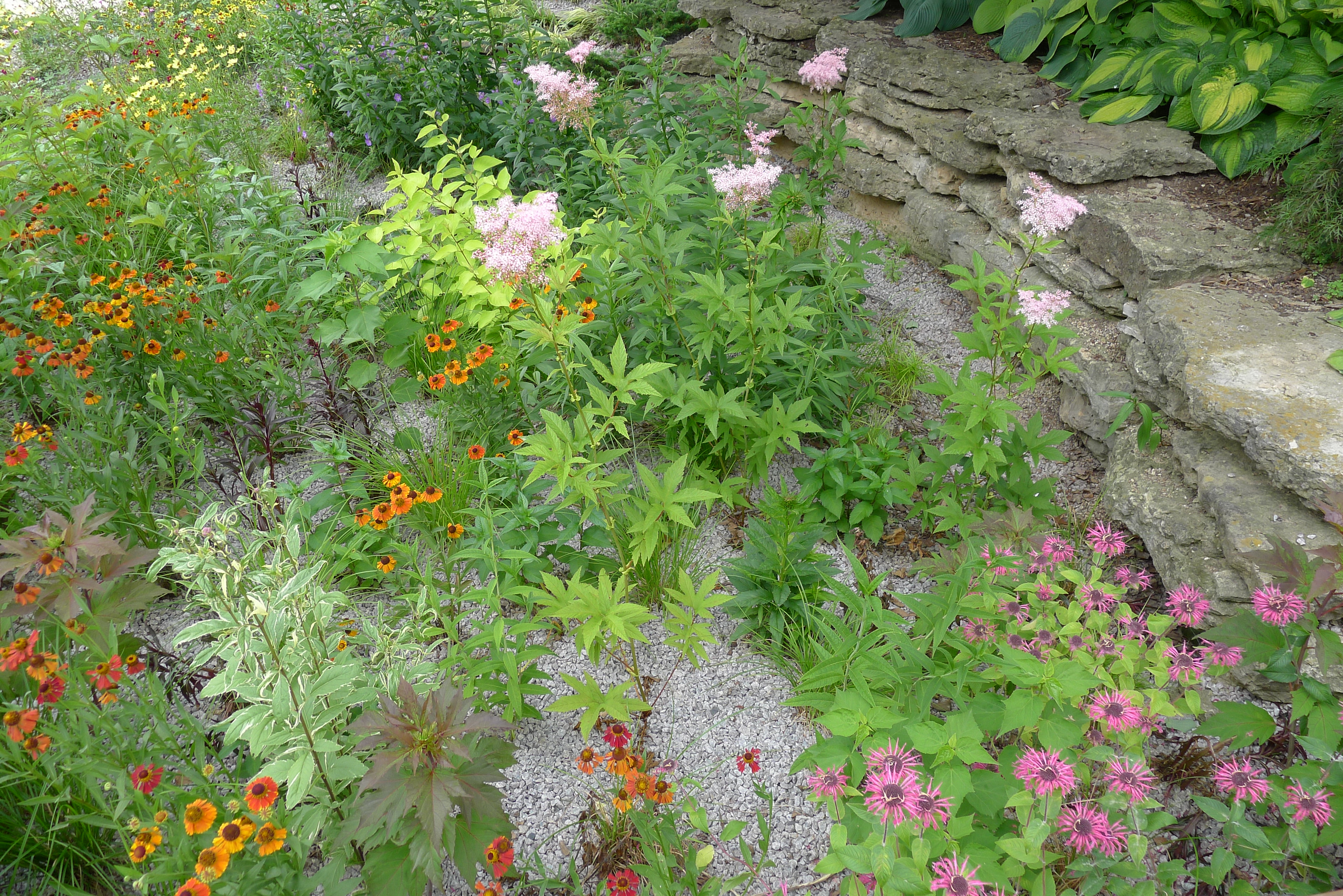
Rain garden

== Advantages and disadvantages ==
=== Sustainability ===
Some drains are able to self-maintain through geomorphological equilibrium. Catchwater drains are predominantly used for agriculture. Agriculture uses the water to in catchwater drains for irrigation and the use for controlling flooding or other functions to direct large amounts of water away from crops during wet seasons. Catchwater drains also allow communities to wore down the water tables when they need to an allow the retentive of the water table to be restore after times of heavy use.

=== Environmental safety ===
Catchwater drains need a lot of landscaping and management. Rain gardens are not suitable for steep slopes unlike other types of catchwater drain. Gardens can get congested and become impervious if land around the garden is not managed. Due to the expense of these systems, they are generally only to be found where there is an extreme shortage of freshwater, because of geographical or political issues.

== See also ==
- Blue roof
