= Tummel hydro-electric power scheme =

Power stations in Perth and Inverness

Tummel hydro-electric scheme
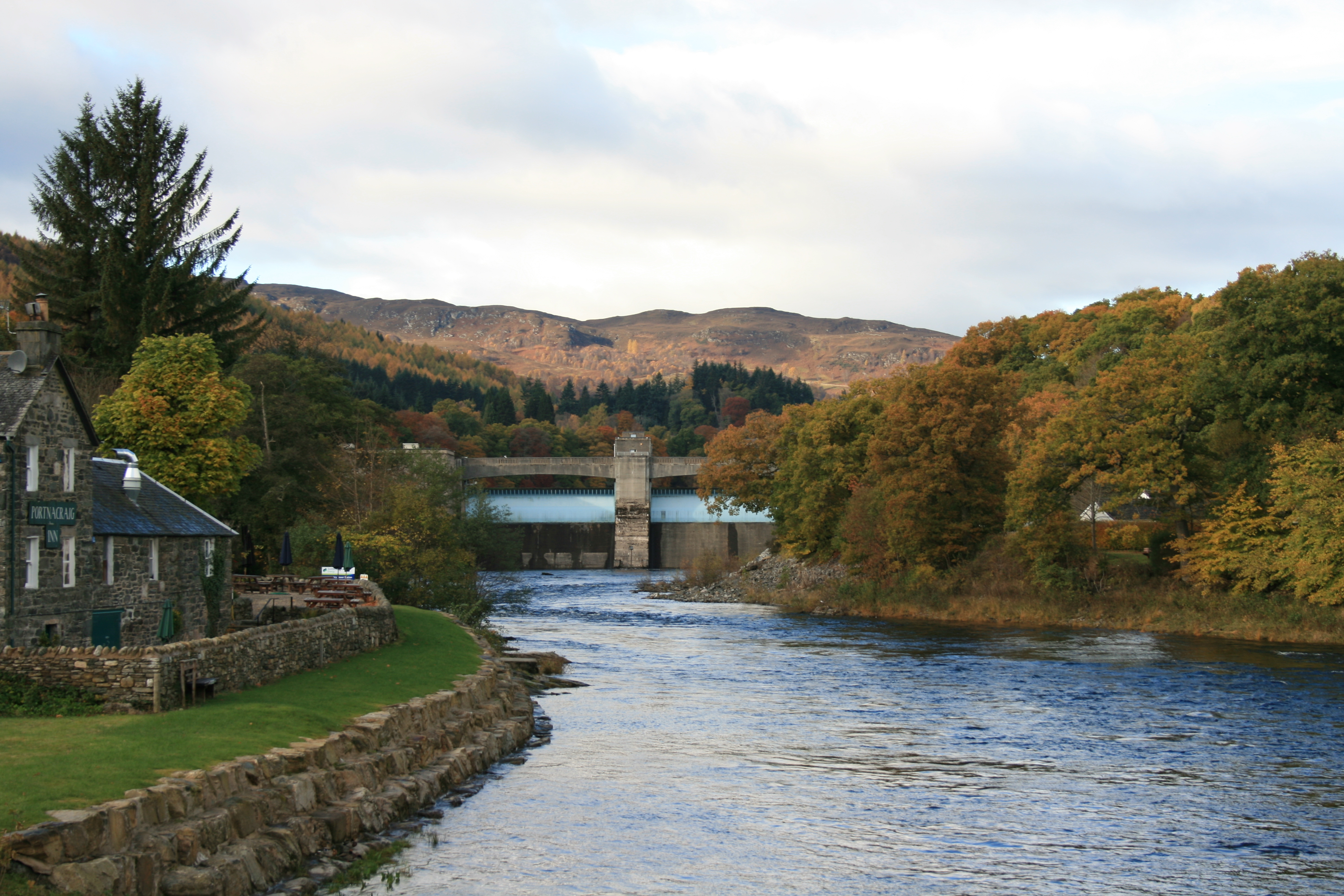
- Pitlochry hydro-electric power station and River Tummel

- Location within Scotland
- Country: Scotland
- Location: Perth and Inverness
- Coordinates: 56.715°N 3.939°W
- Purpose: Power
- Status: Operational
- Construction began: 1928
- Opening date: 1933
- Owner: SSE

The Tummel hydro-electric power scheme is an interconnected network of dams, power stations, aqueducts and electric power transmission in the Grampian Mountains of Scotland. Roughly bounded by Dalwhinnie in the north, Rannoch Moor in the west and Pitlochry in the east it comprises a water catchment area of around 1,800 square kilometres (690 square miles) and primary water storage at Loch Ericht, Loch Errochty, Loch Rannoch and Loch Tummel, in Perth and Kinross. Water, depending on where it originates and the path it takes, may pass through as many as five of the scheme's nine power stations as it progresses from north-west to south-east. The scheme was constructed in the 1940s and 50s incorporating some earlier sites. It is managed by SSE plc.

== Early development ==
The idea of Loch Ericht as a source for hydro-electric power was first anticipated in 1899, when the Highland Water Power Bill was put before Parliament. The plan was to generate electricity for industrial purposes, but the bill did not receive parliamentary approval. The next attempt was the Ericht Water and Electric Power Act 1912 (2 & 3 Geo. 5. c. lxxxix), but it included a clause that prohibited alteration of the water level of the loch, making the scheme uneconomic. Dundee Corporation sought to use Loch Ericht, Loch Rannoch and Loch Tummel in a scheme proposed in 1919, but there was strong opposition to it, and the plans did not come to fruition.

The potential for hydro-electric power in the Highlands of Scotland was recognised by the Snell Committee, who published reports in 1919 and 1920. Against this background, the Grampian Electricity Supply Bill was laid before Parliament. The promotors were aware of the "fundamental principles" set out by the Snell Committee, and ensured that these formed part of the bill. Consequently, the scheme would treat a single catchment area comprehensively, and would ensure that some of the power generated would be made available to residents who lived within the catchment of the scheme. The promotors included the Duke of Atholl and the chairman of Lloyds Bank, John William Beaumont Pease, both men who were known to be honest and trustworthy, and who were held in high regard locally. The bill became the Grampian Electricity Supply Act 1922 (12 & 13 Geo. 5. c. lxxix), and allowed the promotors to use the waters of Loch Ericht, Loch Rannoch and Loch Tummel. Loch Ericht would be augmented by water diverted from Loch Seilich and Loch Garry, increasing the catchment area to 418 square miles (1,080 square kilometres). The power generated would supply an area of over 5,000 square miles (13,000 square kilometres), covering the counties of Perth, Kinross and Forfar, together with parts of Inverness-shire, Argyllshire and Stirlingshire. Some of the power would be sold in bulk to the Scottish Central Electric Power Company and the Fife Electric Power Company.

=== Grampian Electricity Company ===
The newly formed Grampian Electricity Supply Company failed to raise the £1.75 million of authorised capital, and asked George Balfour for help. Balfour, with Andrew Beatty, had formed the engineering company Balfour Beatty in 1907, and in October 1922 this had been restructured so that Power Securities Corporation Ltd bought the share capital of Balfour Beatty and a number of utility companies for which they had provided engineering or management expertise. Power Securities was created specifically to provide funding for capital intensive schemes, and despite the deep depression of late 1922, were able to help. They bought the Grampian company, which was passed to the Scottish Power Company Limited, the Scottish arm of the new organisation, and Balfour Beatty became its engineers and managers. They realised that the scheme could only be economic if some of the power generated was exported to the industrial heartland of central Scotland, as their own area was too sparsely populated. Indeed, the newly-formed Central Electricity Board rejected the idea of extending the national grid into the Grampian area, because of its low demand for power. However, in June 1927 they had agreed to buy bulk electricity from the Grampian company via a link to the national grid at Abernethy and Balfour was ready to proceed with the Grampian scheme.

The Grampian Electricity Supply Act 1922 allowed the Grampian company to raise the maximum level of Loch Ericht by 53 feet (16 m) and to vary the level by 77 feet (23 m) when the scheme was operating. There were much stricter limits on Loch Rannoch, where the level could only vary by 8 feet (2.4 m). Some ingenuity was required to make the scheme work efficiently under all conditions. The solution adopted was to use a power station on the River Tummel below Loch Rannoch to provide most of the power under flood conditions, and to store water in Loch Ericht. When there was less water available, most of the power would come from a power station on the banks of Loch Rannoch, fed with water from Loch Ericht, and Loch Rannoch would be used to store water. Accordingly, Rannoch power station had a capacity of 48 MW and Tummel power station had a capacity of 34 MW.

The scheme was split into two phases, with work on the first beginning in 1928. A concrete gravity dam, 1,400 ft (430 m) long was built at the southern end of Loch Ericht, from where a tunnel cut through solid rock carried the water to a point above the north bank of Loch Rannoch. The tunnel was nearly 3 miles (4.8 km) long, and a steel pipeline then ran down the hillside to Rannoch power station. Several smaller projects supplemented the flow into Loch Ericht by diverting the headwaters of the River Truim, the Allt Ghlas, and other streams. This phase was completed in November 1930. A dam was also constructed at the northern end of Loch Ericht close to the village of Dalwhinnie to contain the raised water level, and prevent it from discharging into the River Truim and flooding Dalwhinnie. The dam has a concrete core with earth embankments on the upstream and downstream faces. It is around 1,150 ft (350 m) long and has a maximum height of 15 ft (4.5 m) above ground level.

The growing need for electricity in the central belt of Scotland meant that the scheme was able to supply 12 MW to the Central Electricity Board, and when the sale of bulk electricity was doubled to 24 MW in late 1930, the Grampian Board had the resources to extend their network to some of the more remote parts of their authorised area, and to press on with the second phase of the scheme. This was the Tummel development, on which work started in Spring 1931. A control weir was built at the outlet to Loch Rannoch, and the river channel below that was made deeper. A dam was built at Dunalastair, 4 miles (6.4 km) below the control weir, creating a new loch called Dunalastair Water. Three miles (4.8 km) of open aqueduct were constructed, running from the dam along the south side of the valley, at the end of which the water descended 170 ft (52 m) through two steel pipes to reach the Tummel power station located on the banks of the Tummel at Tummel Bridge. Rannoch and Tummel power stations were notable for being the first storage high-head stations, where water is held in a reservoir above the power station, rather than simply relying on water passing as part of the run of the river as had previously been done in Scotland.

=== Infrastructure ===
Water from the surrounding hills collects in Loch Ericht. At its southern end, the dam was built on the River Ericht some distance downstream of the loch's outlet, which raised the water level by 14 feet (4.3 m). In order to drain the loch down to 5 feet (1.5 m) below its original level, a channel was cut from the dam for 1.5 miles (2.4 km) at this lower level. This resulted in approximately 78,050 acre feet (96,277,000 m^{3)} of water storage. Water then passes through tunnels and increasingly narrow pipes, reducing from 12 ft 4 in to 7 ft 10.5 in (3.7 m to 2.4 m), as it drops the 485 feet (148 m) to Rannoch power station on the northern bank of Loch Rannoch. At the time Rannoch was fitted with two 22,000 hp (16,500 kW) water turbines with provision for a third. Steel towers, some 97 feet (30 m) high, carried 132 kV power lines east along the bank of the Loch, continuing for 58 miles (93 km) to connect to the National Grid at Abernethy, to the south-east of Perth. A separate 33 kV transmission line ran for 74 miles (119 km) to Arbroath.

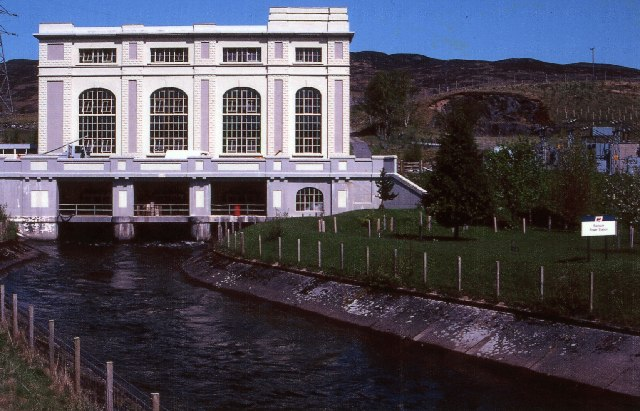
Rannoch power station is supplied with water from Loch Ericht

Loch Rannoch formed the main storage for the next station in line at Tummel, about 8 miles (13 km) downstream to the east. The weir at Kinloch Rannoch regulates the depth at the exit of Loch Rannoch to 8 feet (2.4 m), this being an increase of about 4 ft (1.2 m), with water passing down the River Tummel for 5 miles (8 km) to a narrow point where Dunalastair dam creates an artificial loch known as Dunalastair Water. From there an open aqueduct carries the water the remaining 3 miles (5 km) to Tummel where a head of 170 feet (52 m) powers two 24,000 hp (18,000 kW) horizontal generators, with the electricity generated connected into the same transmission line as Rannoch. The discharge water then rejoined the river Tummel for 1.2 miles (1.9 km) before entering Loch Tummel.

The various works were designed and built by Balfour Beatty with consultant engineer William Halcrow. Subsequently, both Tummel and Rannoch power stations have become Category A listed buildings, being designed in "a simple classical style and with a bold outline."

Kinloch Rannoch weir consists of three floodgates, each 40 feet (12.2 m) wide, which were designed and built by Glenfield and Kennedy of Kilmarnock, Ayrshire. The gates lasted for almost 80 years, but in 2009, SSE decided that they needed to be replaced, and a contract for the work was awarded to Site Services of Aberdeen. The new gates had to comply with modern codes of practice, but could not be heavier than the originals, so that they could be lifted by the original control mechanism. They were manufactured in parts, each of which had a maximum weight of five tonnes, which were then assembled on site. The weight limit allowed them to be lifted into place by an existing overhead gantry, as it would have been too difficult to access the site with a mobile crane.

== Main scheme ==
=== Background ===
In the early 1940s various schemes were proposed for electricity development across Scotland and the nationalised North of Scotland Hydro-Electric Board was established in 1943 to undertake some of them. The schemes, including the then named Tummel-Garry Scheme, were not universally welcomed. At the time the Tummel-Garry scheme was introduced, only 1 in 6 farms and 1 in 200 crofts in Perthshire had electric power. The concerted opposition to the Board's plans resulted in the resignation of the first chair of the board Lord Airlie, and Tom Johnston was appointed to run the board in 1946. His tenure lasted until 1959 and he successfully completed many projects by pushing an agenda of social change through development.

There had been concerted opposition to the Board's first scheme, that at Loch Sloy, but when the Tummel Garry scheme was published as the second scheme to be implemented, the Secretary of State, Tom Johnston received 25 objections. Johnston therefore set up a tribunal to consider the application, overseen by John Cameron, Sir Robert Bryce Walker and Major G H M Brown Lindsay. The hearing lasted for ten days, and the transcripts ran to 1,188 pages. Opposition was spearheaded by Perthshire County Council, a number of riparian landowners and the residents of Pitlochry. There were claims that the amenity of the area would be destroyed, tourists would no longer come to the area, and that salmon fishing would no longer be possible. Edward MacColl, the Board's Chief Executive, was unable to appear as he was ill, and Lord Airlie was a less able witness, who had suffered months of vicious abuse in the press. However, he recovered his composure on the second day, and emphasised that the scheme would benefit much of the North of Scotland and the Islands.

From day six, fishery experts, civil engineers, architects, hotel owners, youth hostelers and environmentalists argued the case for the opposition. There were calls for the Board to develop schemes elsewhere, such as Affric, or the more remote parts of the Highlands. The allegations were acrimonious, but R P Morison, summing up for the Board at the end of the proceedings, stated that the benefits of providing electricity to remote areas where it would be uneconomic to do so without such a scheme outweighed the small amount of damage that might be done, and he was adamant that the tourists would still come to Pitlochry and that the livelihoods of the residents would be maintained. The final report, when it was published, largely agreed with this position, and recommended that the scheme should proceed. There were attempts to derail the progress of the bill in Parliament, which raised the same issues again, but the MP for Perth and Kinross, William Snadden, failed to convince the House of Commons that the confirmation order should be annulled, and Lord Kinnaird was persuaded not to bring a similar motion in the House of Lords.

Edinburgh based architect Harold Tarbolton of Tarbolton & Ochterlony was part of the NoSHEB architectural panel, along with Reginald Fairlie and James Shearer. The panel was responsible for much of the design of the later scheme's structures several of which are now listed. Listings include Pitlochry which is Category A (defined as "Buildings of special architectural or historical interest which are outstanding examples of a particular period, style or building type.") and is described by Historic Environment Scotland as "an outstanding example...a bold modernist design by Harold Tarbolton."

Sir Edward MacColl was the board's engineer having previously been responsible for other hydro schemes. The contracting engineers were Sir Alexander Gibb and Partners and around 12,000 workers were employed at the peak of construction with workers including German and Italian former prisoners of war as well as a cohort of Donegal Tunnel Tigers, Irish tunnelling specialists who moved from job to job.

The scheme was expected to generate 635 Gigawatt-hours a year, and by 1986 it had achieved an average of 663 GWh a year.

=== Infrastructure ===
The first stage of the project involved the construction of the Clunie Dam at the eastern end of Loch Tummel. This raised the level of the loch by 17 feet (5.2 m), and more than doubled its length. Two drum gates control the discharge of flood water through the dam. To allow fish to continue to reach the upper river, a fish ladder consisting of 34 pools was built. The main contractor was George Wimpey. From the dam, a 2-mile (3.2 km) long tunnel was constructed, which is horseshoe shaped in cross section, and was the largest tunnel in Britain at the time, with the same capacity as a 23 ft (7.0 m) diameter pipeline. At the eastern end it feeds three 12 ft (3.7 m) diameter steel pipelines, which each feed a 20.4 MW turbines. The water then discharges into the River Tummel, just below its junction with the River Garry. A memorial arch, with the same cross section as the tunnel, was built at the entrance to the car park, to commemorate those who died during the construction. The main contractor for the tunnel and power station was Cementation Company.

Loch Faskally was created by the construction of the Port-na-Craig Dam at Pitlochry. The water level of the loch is maintained by two automatic drum gates, and varies very little. The gates were the first time that such an arrangement had been used in Britain. The power station contains two 7.5 MW generating sets, and a pool and orifice fish ladder allows fish to reach the upper river. The generated power is carried by underground power lines to Clunie power station, so there are no overhead pylons in the area. The whole project was beset by the difficulty of obtaining the necessary supplies of aggregate, sand, cement and heavy plant. Obtaining workers was worse, and a general shortage of labour continued through 1946, 1947 and early 1948. The Board expected the power stations to be operational by late 1947, but delays resulted in the Clunie generators coming online in April, June and November 1950, while the Pitlochry generators came online in October and December 1950. A formal opening by Lady MacColl was due to be held on 16 July 1951, but Edward MacColl died on the previous day.

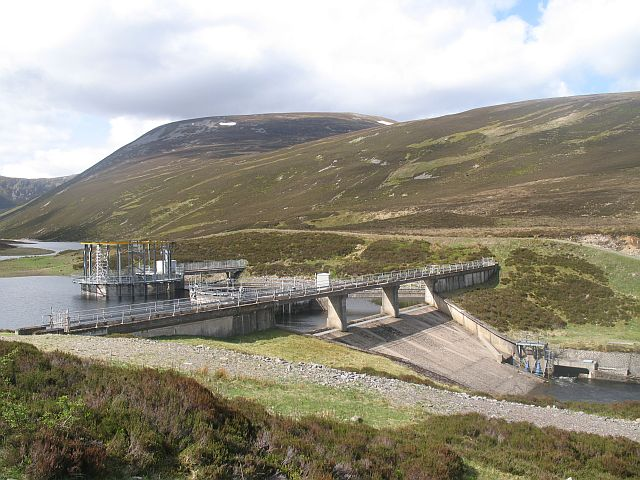
The Tromie Dam at the northern end of Loch an t-Seilich. The circular enclosure behind the dam is the start of the tunnel that takes water to Loch Cuaich and Cuaich power station.

The second phase of the project involved constructing a dam across Glen Errochty close to the junction of the Errochty Water and Allt Con. This impounded the waters of those two rivers, to form Loch Errochty, and the volume of water impounded was increased by a long tunnel which headed northwards and then to the east, collecting water from several of the upper tributaries of the River Garry. A second tunnel and buried pipeline, 6.2 miles (10 km) long, fed the water from the loch to Errochty power station, at the western end of Loch Tummel. Errochty power station was larger than any of the other stations, with two turbines and an installed capacity of 75 MW. Water which passed through the power station was then used again at Clunie and Pitlochry. In order to maintain some flow on the Errochty Water, compensation water is fed through a pipeway and into the river channel. A small turbine is installed in the pipeway, so that even this water generates electricity.

Three small stations completed the project. Gaur power station is located on the banks of the River Gaur, 0.3 miles (0.5 km) below Gaur Dam, which impounds water in Loch Eigheach. After passing through the turbine, the water is discharged into the River Gaur to reach Loch Rannoch. Because of its remote location, the station was the first in Scotland to be automated. Loch Ericht power station is on the eastern bank of Loch Ericht, and is fed with water from Loch Garry. Cuaich power station is the most northerly of the scheme, and its single turbine is fed from Loch Cuaich, which is dammed at its southern end. A tunnel brings further water to Loch Cuaich from Loch an t-Seilich, which is dammed at its northern end.

=== Water route ===
There are four main water paths in the completed scheme, all of which ultimately discharge into Loch Tummel to feed the Clunie and Pitlochry stations. From the north the highest storage point in the scheme is at Loch an t-Seilich, which is at 1,391 ft (424 m) above ordnance datum (AOD). The loch covers 280 acres (113 ha) and has a catchment area of 23.52 square miles (60.9 km^{2}). Water passes through a tunnel to Loch Cuaich at 1,319 feet (402 m) AOD, which covers 115 acres (47 ha) and has a catchment area of 5.97 square miles (15.47 km^{2}). This feeds the Cuaich station discharging into the north-east end of Loch Ericht at 1,168 ft (356 m) AOD. Loch Ericht has a surface area of 8.64 square miles (22.4 km^{2}) and a catchment area of 52.37 square miles (135.6 km^{2}).

A second path begins at Loch Garry, which is at 1,352 feet (412 m) AOD. It has a surface area of 406 acres (164 ha) and a catchment area of 22.61 square miles (58.6 km^{2}). Water from Loch Garry feeds west through a tunnel to Ericht power station on the east bank of Loch Erich, and discharges into the loch. Water from Loch Ericht flows through a tunnel to Rannoch power station, which was part of the Grampian scheme, and discharges into Loch Rannoch. This is at 676 feet (206 m) AOD, covers an area of 7.26 square miles (18.8 km^{2}) and has a catchment area of 247.19 square miles (640.2 km^{2}).

From the west water from Rannoch Moor is impounded at Loch Eigheach, which is at 827 ft (252 m) AOD. It is relatively small with a surface area of 327 acres (132 ha), but its catchment area is 66 square miles (171 km^{2}). It feeds Gaur power station, discharging into the River Gaur, which flows into the western end of Loch Rannoch. At the eastern end of Loch Rannoch, Kinloch Rannoch weir regulates the outflow into the River Tummel, which soon reaches Dunalastair Reservoir, at 643 ft (196 m) AOD. Its surface area is 358 acres (145 ha) and its catchment area 266.62 square miles (690.5 km^{2}). Water from Dunalastair Reservoir feeds Tummel power station, built as part of the 1930s Grampian scheme, with the water discharging into the River Tummel.

In the centre of the system the headwaters of the River Bruar and of several of the tributaries of the River Garry are fed to storage at Loch Errochty, at 1,076 ft (328 m) AOD. It has a surface area of 748 acres (303 ha) and a catchment area of 19.66 square miles (50.9 km^{2}). Most of the water feeds Errochty power station, which discharges into the River Tummel just to the west of Loch Tummel. Some bypass water, used to maintain a small river known as Errochty Water, is used to generate power at Trinafour. Errochty Water joins the River Garry, which flows into Loch Faskally, and is the only power station in the scheme where the water does not eventually reach Loch Tummel.

Regardless of path that it takes, most of the water arrives at Loch Tummel, where it is impounded by the Clunie Dam located in a narrow valley at the eastern end of the loch. The construction of this dam raised the water level by 17 feet (5.2 m) to create a reservoir with a capacity of 36,400,000 cubic metres. Loch Tummel is at 466 ft (142 m) AOD, has a surface area of 1,430 acres (579 ha) and a catchment area of 315.92 square miles (818.2 km^{2}). Water then passes through Clunie station to Loch Faskally which feeds the Pitlochry station.

The scheme power stations are generally, though not exclusively, named for their physical location as opposed to the source of their water supply. For example, Loch Ericht station is fed from Loch Garry but is adjacent to, and discharges into, Loch Ericht. A notable exception is Errochty power station, which discharges into Loch Tummel. It is also known as Tummel Bridge to distinguish it from the nearby, pre-existing Tummel station.

=== Ecological impact ===
The scheme made many changes to the natural water courses across the region. Many of the scheme's rivers and lochs are categorised as Heavily Modified Water Bodies (defined as a body of surface water which, as a result of physical alterations by human activity, is substantially changed in character.) Near the highest point in the scheme the upper River Garry was completely dry for a distance of 20 km (12 miles) from the 1950s until a project in 2017 returned some water, around 1 m^{3} (35 cu ft) per second, to the section. Other associated changes included the removal of a weir at Struan to allow fish to pass up the river.

Power Station Information
Station Name	Capacity (MW)	Head of Water (m)	Year Completed
Cuaich	2.5	27	1959
Loch Ericht	2.2	55	1962
Rannoch	44	156	1930
Gaur	7.5	30	1953
Tummel	34	53	1933
Errochty (Tummel Bridge)	75	186	1957
Trinafour	0.5	91	1959
Clunie	61	53	1950
Pitlochry	15	15	1950

The scheme has nine named dams and one weir. The 1930 dam at Ericht (for Rannoch) appears to have been extended as part of the later scheme.

Listed by SSE as main dams are: Gaur, Errochty, Clunie and Pitlochry. Other dams are at Ericht, Dalwhinnie, Dunalastair, Cuaich, and Tromie (Loch an-t-Seilich). A significant weir at Kinloch Rannoch is also part of the scheme.

Dam information
Dam Name	Type	Height (m)	Length (m)	Year Completed	Approximate Altitude
Gaur (Loch Eigheach)	Concrete Gravity	13	110	1958	259
Errochty	Buttress	49	501	1957	329
Clunie (Loch Tummel)	Concrete Gravity	21	116	1951	144
Pitlochry	Mass Gravity	16	145	1951	
Ericht	Concrete Gravity	14.5	340	1930 / 54	359
Dalwhinnie	Concrete Core embankment	4.5	350	1954	
Dunalastair	Concrete Gravity	11	88	1933	
Kinloch Rannoch Weir				1930s	
Cuaich					397
Tromie					
Clunie	Concrete Gravity	21	116	1951	

== Bibliography ==
- Dempster, K J; et al. (2004). "Ericht and Dalwhinnie Dam refurbishment and protection works" (PDF). Long-term benefits and performance of dams. Thomas Telford (reproduced by British Dams Society). Archived (PDF) from the original on 13 June 2021.
- Johnson, F. G. (3 September 1986). "Experience with the concrete dams of the North of Scotland Hydro-Electric Board" (PDF). British Dams. The British National Committee on Large Dams. Archived (PDF) from the original on 14 June 2021.
- Miller, James (2002). The Dam Builders - Power from the Glens. Birlinn. ISBN 978-1-84158-225-2.
- Munro, Allan; Ross, Duncan (2010). "Contested Energy: A Long-term Perspective on Opposition to Renewable Power Developments in Scotland" (PDF). European Business History Association. Archived (PDF) from the original on 13 June 2021.
- Payne, Peter L (1988). The Hydro. Aberdeen University Press. ISBN 978-0-08-036584-8.
- Ritchie, Gayle (13 January 2021). "Pitlochry Dam: Controversial scheme sparked doom-laden fears of dried-up rivers and submerged homes". The Courier. Archived from the original on 17 August 2022.
