= Schiehallion =

Mountain in central Scotland

- Sìth Chailleann
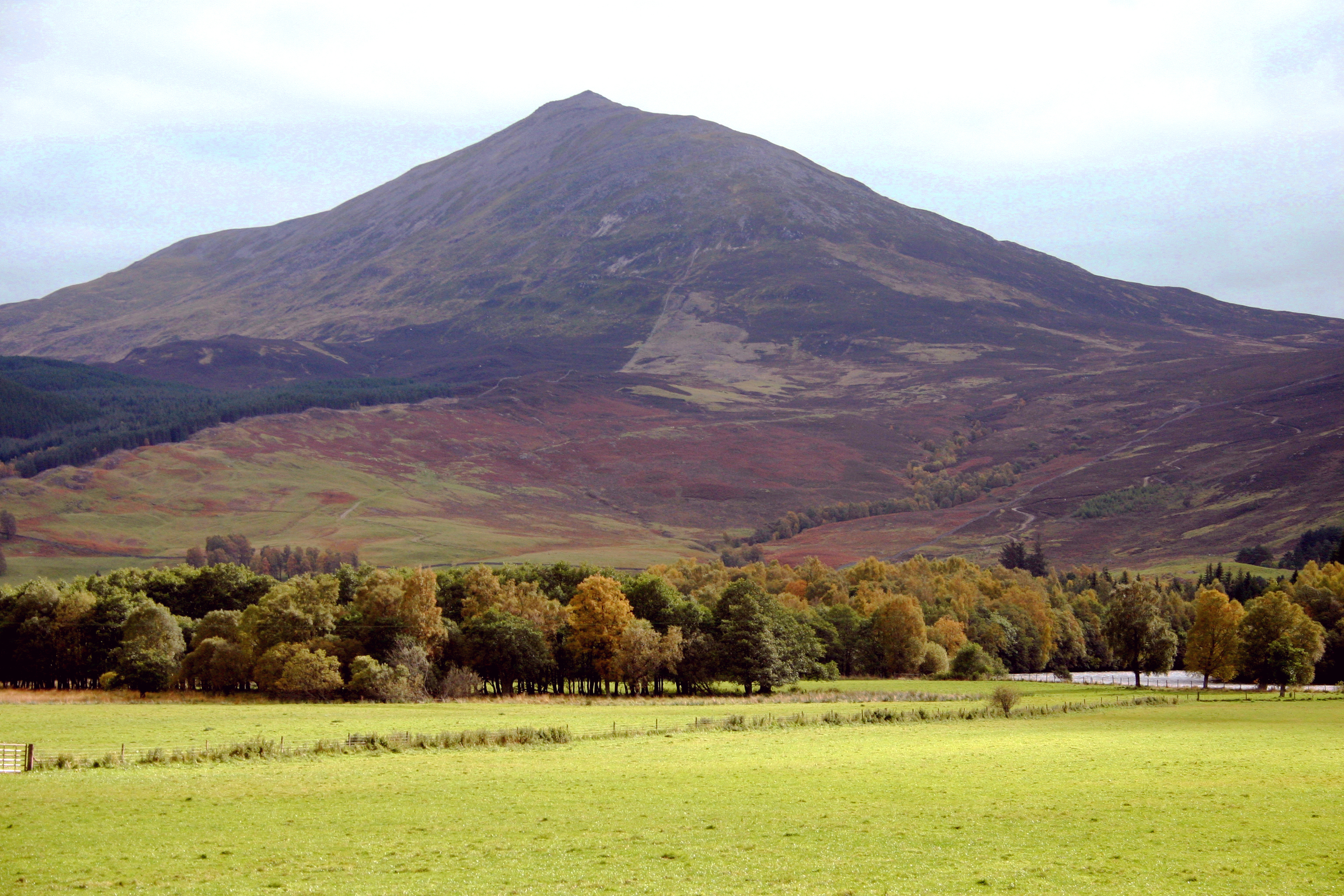
- Schiehallion viewed across the River Tummel.

Highest point
- Elevation: 1,083 m (3,553 ft)
- Prominence: c. 716 m
- Parent peak: Ben Lawers
- Listing: Munro, Marilyn
- Coordinates: 56.6668°N 4.1001°W

Naming
- English translation: fairy hill of Caledonia
- Language of name: Gaelic
- Pronunciation: Scottish Gaelic: [ʃiˈxaʎən̪ˠ]

Geography
- Location within Perth and Kinross
- Location: Perthshire, Scotland
- Parent range: Breadalbane, Grampians
- OS grid: NN714548
- Topo map: OS Landranger 51

Schiehallion (/ʃiːˈhæli.ən/; Scottish Gaelic: Sìth Chailleann, IPA: [ʃiˈxaʎən̪ˠ]) is a prominent cone-shaped mountain in the Breadalbane region of the Scottish Highlands, in the county of Perthshire. It rises to 1,083 metres (3,553 ft) and is classed as a Munro. Schiehallion has a rich flora, interesting folklore and archaeology, and a unique place in scientific history for an 18th-century experiment in "weighing the Earth". It is near the centre of mainland Scotland. The mountain's popularity amongst walkers led to erosion on its footpath and extensive repairs were undertaken in 2001.

== Name ==
The name comes from the Gaelic Sìth Chailleann, meaning "fairy hill of the Caledonians"; compare nearby Dunkeld (Gaelic Dùn Chailleann), whose name means "fort of the Caledonians". A Lowland name for the mountain, recorded in the 18th century, was "Maiden Pap".

== Location ==
Schiehallion lies between Loch Tay, Loch Rannoch and Loch Tummel, about 10 miles (16 kilometres) to the west-north-west of Aberfeldy in Perthshire. The mountain, with an elevation of 1,083 metres (3,553 ft), is isolated from other peaks and has an almost perfectly conical shape from the west. The view of the broad eastern flank attracts many visitors to the shores of Loch Tummel.

Schiehallion is sometimes described as the centre of Scotland, as it lies only 5 km west of the centre of gravity of (a uniform plane in the shape of) mainland Scotland. The folk group Gaberlunzie sang a song "The Back of Schiehallion", meaning Scotland.

== Botany ==
The slopes of Schiehallion are rich in botanical life, with heathers, mosses, lingonberry and blaeberry. Blanket bog and heather moorland change colour with the seasons. The limestone pavement provides nutrients, supporting plants including dog's mercury, lily of the valley and wood anemone.

== Geology ==
The majority of Schiehallion consists of quartzite, a rock formed from an original sand by heat and pressure. Quartzite is a white or pinkish rock, in which the dominant mineral is quartz. People often mistakenly think that Schiehallion is an extinct volcano because its shape is reminiscent of an active volcano; in fact, it was formed by sedimentary processes and the shape is the result of erosion by ice during the ice ages.

== History ==
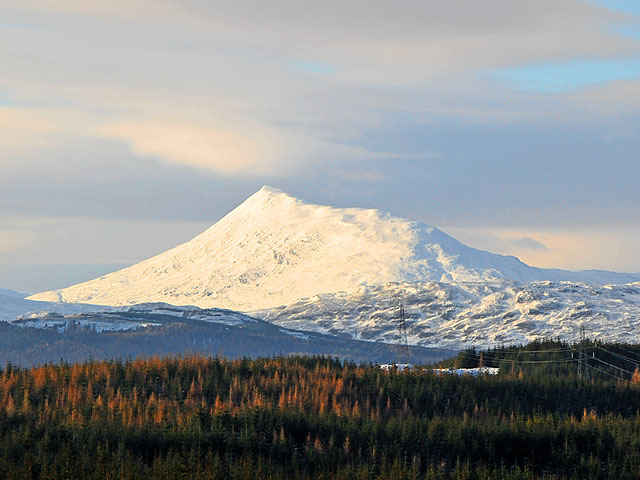
Schiehallion covered in snow

The slopes of Schiehallion have been inhabited and cultivated since the first millennium BC until approximately two hundred years ago. Schiehallion has been used for grazing sheep and stalking red deer.

Since 1999 the eastern side of the mountain has been owned by the John Muir Trust.

=== The Schiehallion experiment ===
Schiehallion's isolated position and regular shape led it to be selected by the English astronomer Charles Mason (of Mason–Dixon line fame) for a ground-breaking experiment to estimate the mass of the Earth in 1774. The deflection of a pendulum by the mass of the mountain provided an estimate of the mean density of the Earth, from which its mass and a value for Newton's gravitational constant G could be deduced. Mason turned down a commission to carry out the work, and it was instead coordinated by the Astronomer Royal, Nevil Maskelyne. He was assisted in the task by mathematician Charles Hutton, who devised a graphical system to represent large volumes of surveyed heights, later known as contour lines.

== Footpath ==
A Munro mountain, Schiehallion is popular with walkers due to its accessibility, ease of ascent and views from its summit. An estimated 17,500 to 20,000 walkers made the ascent in 2000. Most walkers start from the Forestry and Land Scotland car park at Brae of Foss, which lies just outside the boundary of the John Muir Trust estate. The route, which initially heads southwest before turning west to follow the main ridgeline of the hill, is about 4.5 kilometres (2 3/4 miles) in length.

Ben Nevis, the highest mountain in the British Isles, can be seen to the west from the summit of Schiehallion.

By 1999, when the John Muir Trust bought the estate, the main path had become exceedingly eroded by the passage of many thousands of walkers. The scar was visible from quite a distance. The organisation therefore decided to construct a new path, following a different line, better able to handle the pressure of visitors.

== In culture ==
=== In the folklore of Perthshire ===
On the southwestern side of the mountain lies the well-concealed Uamh Tom a’ Mhòr-fhir (= cave (uamh) of the mound (tom) of the big man (mhòr-fhir)), featuring in the folklore of Rannoch as an entrance to the underworld. The Scottish Gaelic word tom can mean not only a natural hillock or knoll of round or conical form (or, indeed a natural thicket/mound of vegetation) but also a grave mound or tumulus. Accounts of a ghostly dog haunting the lower slopes of Schiehallion serve to reinforce such an association, since such portals to the supernatural realms are traditionally guarded, in Scottish folklore and mythology, by the Cù-sìth, (= fairy dog). The mountain is also one of the haunts of the ancient winter goddess of Scotland known as the Cailleach Bheur.

=== Modern cultural references ===
The Schiehallion oilfield in the North Atlantic is named after the mountain. One of the major oilfields on Scotland's continental shelf, it is operated by BP and situated approximately 175 kilometres (95 nautical miles) west of the Shetland Mainland.

Schiehallion was the setting for much of book two of Grant Morrison's comic series Zenith, and also the electro-magnetic prison for the Chimera creature which would play a major part in subsequent books.

The Harviestoun Brewery produce a cask-conditioned lager called Schiehallion.

A Scottish country dance ("Schiehallion") and figure, the Schiehallion Reel, are both named after the mountain.

The song "Schiehallion" was featured on the 1994 album Time For A New Day by the independent band King Rizla.

Pipe Major Donald Shaw Ramsay composed a 3/4 march entitled "Schiehallion".

The England-based band "Schiehallion Pipes and Drums" (named for the Munro) has adopted the march as their signature tune. It is the lead-in tune on their album Hail! Schiehallion.

The Anglo-Cypriot power metal band Gloryhammer mentions Schiehallion in the song "The Fires of Ancient Cosmic Destiny" on the album Legends from Beyond the Galactic Terrorvortex and refers to the popular misconception that mountain is a volcano.

== Gallery ==
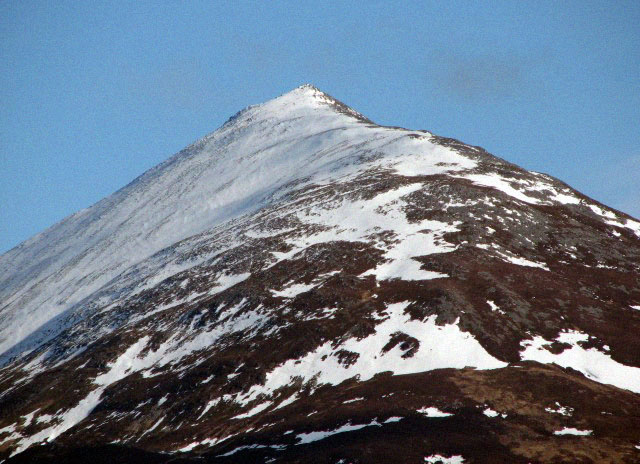
The north-west ridge of Schiehallion in April

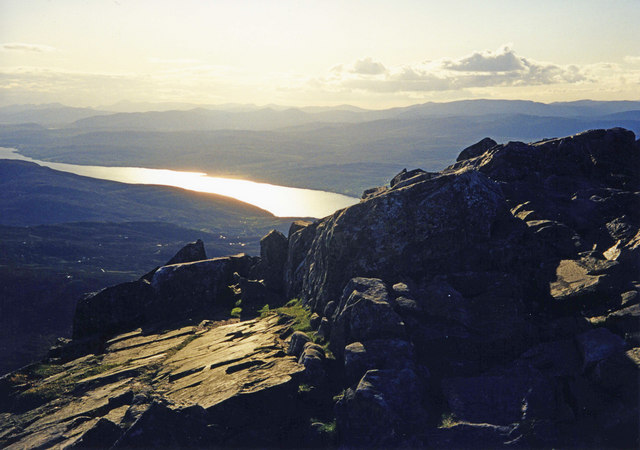
View from the summit of Schiehallion looking over Loch Rannoch into the setting sun

View from summit of Schiehallion towards Loch Rannoch

== See also ==
- List of places in Perth and Kinross
- List of mountains in Scotland
- Maiden Paps
- Breast shaped hills
