= Loch Rannoch =

Freshwater loch in Perth and Kinross, Scotland

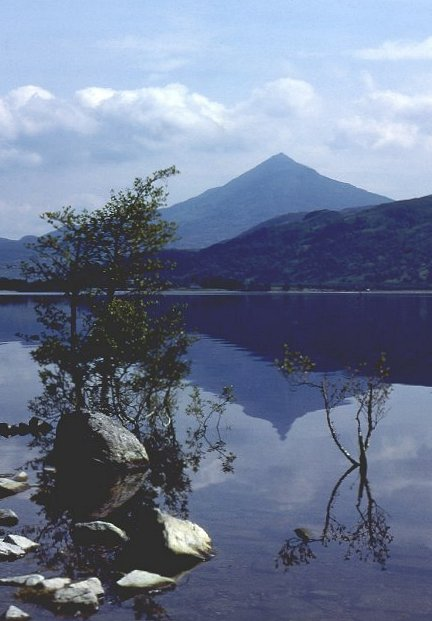
- Looking towards Schiehallion

- Location within Perth and Kinross
- Location: Perth and Kinross
- Coordinates: 56°40′59″N 4°18′50″W
- Type: freshwater loch
- Primary outflows: River Tummel
- Max. length: 15.69 km (9.75 mi)
- Max. width: 1.21 km (0.75 mi)
- Average depth: 51.1 m (167.5 ft)
- Max. depth: 130 m (440 ft)
- Water volume: 0.97 km^{3} (0.23 mi^{3})

Loch Rannoch (Scottish Gaelic: Loch Raineach) is a freshwater loch in Perth and Kinross, Scotland. It is over 15 kilometres (9.3 mi) long in a west–east direction with an average width of about 1.2 kilometres (0.75 mi), and is deepest at its eastern end, reaching a depth of 130 metres (440 ft). The River Tummel begins at its eastern end, where the small village of Kinloch Rannoch can be found, whilst the wild expanse of Rannoch Moor extends to the west of the loch. The area surrounding Loch Rannoch, along with Rannoch Moor itself, was formerly part of the native Caledonian Forest that stretched across much of Northern Scotland. Native forest is now largely absent from much of the area, due partly to logging, and partly to the climate becoming wetter, and Loch Rannoch is now largely surrounded by commercial forestry and open hillsides, although a small area remains at the Black Wood of Rannoch on the southern shore of the loch.

Loch Rannoch forms part of the Loch Rannoch and Glen Lyon National Scenic Area, one of 40 such areas in Scotland, which are defined so as to identify areas of exceptional scenery and to ensure its protection from inappropriate development by restricting certain forms of development.

== Tourism ==
The surrounding area has many attractions, which can be found on the Rannoch and Tummel Tourist Association site which has information about the glen. The loch offers good sport fishing, with brown and ferox trout, arctic charr, pike and perch all present, although there are no salmon in the loch. Fishing is managed by the Loch Rannoch Conservation Association, which issues permits and control catches in accordance with the Salmon and Freshwater Fisheries (Consolidation) (Scotland) Act 2003.

Areas of forestry around Loch Rannoch owned by Forestry and Land Scotland (FLS) form part of the Tay Forest Park, a network of FLS forests spread across the Highland parts of Perthshire that are managed to provide walks and amenities for visitors.

== Historical sites ==
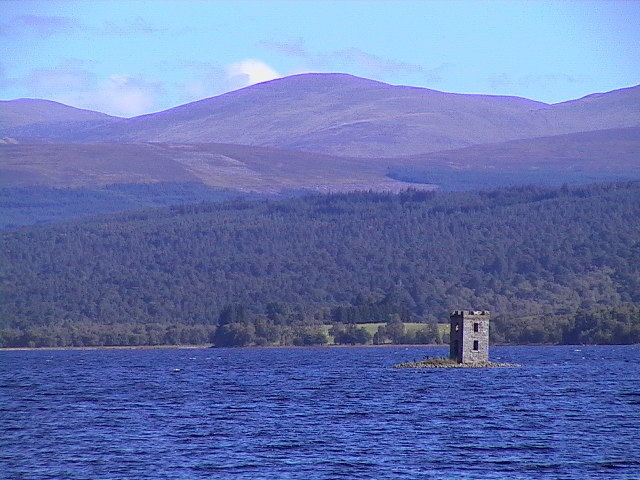
Eilean nam Faoileag crannog

A crannog is present at Eilean nam Faoileag in the western half of the loch. A folly was constructed on the island in the nineteenth century, reputedly by a Baron Granbley. The folly, which is still standing, takes the form of a tower, and may be based on the design of a small island prison. There may also be crannog at Eilean Beal na Gaoire at the very western end of the loch, however the level of the loch has been raised causing the island to become submerged, and so its status as a crannog was regarded as uncertain when surveyed in 1969.

Mary, Queen of Scots, who was in Glen Tilt, wrote to Colin Campbell of Glenorchy on 3 August 1564, asking him to demolish a house of strength on an island in the loch. The Clan Macdonald of Clanranald were rebuilding the house, which her father James V had previously ordered to be demolished.

== Transport ==
The historic route of the Road to the Isles went along Loch Rannoch as part of the route between Pitlochry on the main Stirling to Inverness road, and Lochaber, and Loch Rannoch is one of the places mentioned in the Scottish folk song named after the road. The road is now classified as the B846, which runs along the north shore of the loch. The road terminates at Rannoch railway station on the West Highland Line, some 5 1/2 miles (9 km) west of Loch Rannoch. The route of the Road to the Isles continues only as an untarmaced track from here to the west.

== Hydro-electricity ==
Rannoch Power Station, on the northern shore of the loch, is part of the Tummel hydro-electric power scheme, which is operated by SSE. The power station has a vertical head of 156 m (512 ft) and a total generating capacity of 44 MW, and uses water fed by pipeline and tunnel from Loch Ericht which is discharged into Loch Rannoch.

== Black Wood of Rannoch ==
The Black Wood of Rannoch, a fragment of the former Caledonian Forest, lies on the southern shore of Loch Rannoch. It is designated as a Special Area of Conservation (SAC), and is the largest remaining area of Caledonian Forest in Perth and Kinross. The forest supports a number of rare plants including species such as coralroot Corallorhiza trifida and serrated wintergreen Orthilia secunda. It also supports populations of Scottish crossbill and capercaillie.

The Black Wood of Rannoch had been used to provide timber for nearly 200 years, and during the Great War, there were plans to fell it completely. The wood has been owned and managed by the Forestry Commission and its successor body, Forestry and Land Scotland (FLS), since 1947. FLS manage the wood as a forest reserve as well as to provide Scots pine seeds for use in regeneration projects across Scotland.
