= List of power stations in Scotland =

This list of power stations in Scotland includes current and former electricity-generating power stations in Scotland, sorted by type. Scotland is a net exporter of electricity and has a generating capacity of over 10 GW. None of this is generated by conventional oil- or gas-burning power stations. Instead there is one large gas turbine power station and one large nuclear power station, as well as several hydro-electric schemes, predominantly in the Highlands, comprising over 80 generating stations with a combined capacity of 1.4 GW. Scotland also has an increasing number of wind farms, due to the large proportion of upland areas. As of July 2010, there were 100 operating wind farms in Scotland with a combined capacity of 8 GW, and a further 96 projects under construction or consented, with capacity of 2 GW. A number of other power plants include experimental wave power and tidal power generators, and Steven's Croft near Lockerbie, which is the UK's largest wood-fired biomass power station. Since 2016, no coal-fired power stations operate in Scotland.

A pink background denotes a power station that is no longer operational.

== Nuclear power stations ==
Name	Operator	Location (UK grid reference)	Council area	Type	Capacity (MW)	Commissioned	Closed
Chapelcross	Nuclear Decommissioning Authority	NY216697	Dumfries and Galloway	Magnox	200	1959	2004
Dounreay DFR	Nuclear Decommissioning Authority	NC981668	Highland	Fast breeder reactor	14	1962	1977
Dounreay PFR	Nuclear Decommissioning Authority	NC981668	Highland	Fast breeder reactor	250	1975	1994
Hunterston A	Nuclear Decommissioning Authority	NS183514	North Ayrshire	Magnox	360	1964	1990
Hunterston B	EDF Energy	NS183514	North Ayrshire	Advanced gas-cooled reactor	1,288	1976	2022
Torness	EDF Energy	NT746750	East Lothian	Advanced gas-cooled reactor	1,364	1988	-

== Coal-fired ==
Scotland has no operational coal-fired power stations, the last being Longannet which closed in 2016.

Name	Operator	Location (UK grid reference)	Council area	Capacity (MW)	Commissioned	Closed
Aberdeen			Aberdeen City	57.25	operating 1959	Closed
Barony	SSEB	NS528218	East Ayrshire	60	1957	1989
Bonnybridge	Scottish Central Electric Power Co. / S.S.E.B.			60	operating 1959	Closed
Braehead	SSEB	NS517677	Renfrewshire	260	1951	1979
Clyde's Mill	Clyde Valley Electrical Power Co. / S.S.E.B.			277.5	1916	Closed
Cockenzie	ScottishPower	NT394754	East Lothian	1,200	1967	2013
Dalmarnock	Clyde Valley Electrical Power Co. / S.S.E.B.			257.5		Closed
Dundee (Carolina Port)	Dundee Corporation		Dundee	75.625	operating 1959	1984
Dunfermline (Townhill)	Fife Electric Power Co.			25.5	operating 1959	Closed
Falkirk	Scottish Central Electric Power Co.			7.5	operating 1959	Closed
Galashiels				6.625	operating 1959	Closed
Kilmarnock	Ayrshire Electricity Board			60	operating 1959	Closed
Kincardine	ScottishPower	NS923882	Fife	760	1958	1997
Longannet	ScottishPower	NS953852	Fife	2,400	1970	2016
Methil	ScottishPower	NO381002	Fife	57	1965	2000
Pinkston	Glasgow Corporation/S.S.E.B.	NS595667	Glasgow	65	1901	1960s
Portobello	Edinburgh Corporation/S.S.E.B.	NT301743	Edinburgh		1934	1977
Yoker	Clyde Valley Electrical Power Co./S.S.E.B.	NS510686	Glasgow	100	1905	1976

== Oil- and gas-fired ==
Name	Operator	Location (UK grid reference)	Council area	Fuel	Capacity (MW)	Commissioned	Closed
Arnish	SSE	NB422304	Western Isles	Diesel	10.3	2000	-
Barra	SSE	NF718033	Western Isles	Diesel	2.5	1986	-
Bowmore	SSE	NR320602	Argyll and Bute	Diesel	6.0	1946	-
Brodick				Diesel	3.087		
Campbeltown				Diesel	3.740		
Daliburgh				Diesel	1.56		
Grangemouth	INEOS	NS944810	Falkirk	Gas	130	2001	-
Inverkip	South of Scotland Electricity Board	NS196711	Inverclyde	Oil	1900	1970	1988
Kirkwall	SSE	HY44651097	Orkney	Oil	16	1951	
Lerwick A and B	SSE	HU465427	Shetland	Oil	67	1953 & 1996	-
Lochalsh				Diesel	0.91		
Loch Carnan	SSE	NF832427	Western Isles	Diesel	11.8	1971	-
Peterhead	SSE	NK127430	Aberdeenshire	Gas	1550	1980	-
Stornoway	SSE	NB431321	Western Isles	Diesel	23.5	1950	-
Sullom Voe Terminal	ENGIE	HU401751	Shetland	Gas	22 (100)	1980	-
Tiree	SSE	NL997446	Argyll and Bute	Diesel	2.5	1953	-
Tobermory				Diesel	1.375		

== Hydro-electric ==
Hydroelectricity relies on gravity to propel water through power-generating turbines. The difference in height between the turbine and the water source is known as the "head". Smaller "run-of-river" schemes operate only when there is sufficient water, larger schemes typically involve a storage reservoir. Pumped-storage hydro-electric power stations, can also pump water back up to the storage reservoir during periods of low electricity demand or high renewable generation.

=== Pumped-storage hydro-electric ===
Scotland has two large pumped-storage hydro-electric power stations, Cruachan and Foyers. Although claimed to be the first such station in the world when it opened in 1965 by the Visit Cruachan website, Drax Group PLC's Cruachan Power Station was preceded by the Ffestiniog Power Station in North Wales, which opened in 1963, and on a smaller scale by the North of Scotland Hydro-Electric Board's Sron Mor power station opened in 1957, part of the Shira Hydro-Electric Scheme. Cruachan can hold 7 gigawatt-hours (25 TJ) of energy, equivalent to 22 hours of full production. 12 hours is reserved for black start.

Name	Operator	Location (UK grid ref.)	Council area	Gross head (m)	Capacity (MW)	Stored energy	Date commissioned
Sron Mor	SSE Renewables	NN161200	Argyll and Bute	40 feet (12 m)	5		1957
Cruachan	Drax Group	NN077268	Argyll and Bute	360	440	7 GWh or 8.8	1965
Foyers/Loch Mhòr	SSE Renewables	NH503217	Highland	179	300	6.3 GWh	1974

There are several proposals for new pumped storage hydro-electric schemes in Scotland, mostly in the Great Glen;

- The 600 MW Coire Glas scheme is being developed by SSE above the northwestern shores of Loch Lochy. The scheme was given planning permission in October 2020 and exploratory geotechnical work had started by December 2022.
- The 450 MW Loch na Cathrach (formerly called Red John) Pumped Storage Hydro Scheme to the southeast of Dores. It would involve a new upper reservoir constructed near Loch Duntelchaig. The scheme was developed by Intelligent Land Investments Group and acquired by Statkraft at the end of 2023.
- An up-to 600 MW Loch Kemp Storage scheme, southwest of Loch Ness near Whitebridge. A planning application was submitted in November 2023. If built, the water level in Loch Kemp could fluctuate by up to 28 m. The Ness District Salmon Fisheries Board have raised concerns about the cumulative impact of these schemes on water levels in Loch Ness, and the effect this might have on Salmon.
- The 900–1800 MW Earba Storage is being developed by Gilkes Energy in the Ardverikie Estate to the southwest of Loch Laggan. It would use Lochan na h-Earba and Loch a’ Bhealaich Leamhain as the lower and upper reservoirs, both with new dams required. An application for consent under Section 36 of the Electricity Act was submitted in March 2024, supported by an environmental impact assessment, and received planning consent in 2025.
- A 1500 MW/45 GWh scheme is being developed in Argyll & Bute by Intelligent Land Investments Group called Balliemeanoch PSH, using Loch Awe as the lower reservoir. A planning application under Section 36 of the Electricity Act was submitted to the Scottish Government in July 2024, with the scheme aiming for completion in 2031.
- A 1800 MW/37 GWh scheme at Loch Fearna above the existing reservoir at Loch Quoich is being developed by SSE Renewables and Gilkes Energy.
- A 2 GW/34 GWh scheme is being developed by Glen Earrach Energy (GEE) on the western shore of Loch Ness. The upper reservoir would be formed at Loch nam Breac Dearga, about half way between Drumnadrochit and Invermoriston, using Loch Ness as the lower reservoir. A 300–600 MW scheme was previously proposed by SSE under the name Balmacaan Hydro, storing up to 30 GWh. By May 2024, a consortium without SSE worked on the project. The planning application was submitted in May 2025.

Scotland has a potential for around 500 GWh of pumped storage.

=== Conventional hydro-electric ===
Several of Scotland's hydro-electric plants were built to power the aluminium smelting industry, but many more were built in the mid-20th century by the North of Scotland Hydro-Electric Board to supply the communities of the Highlands. These were built in several "schemes" of linked stations, each covering a catchment area, whereby the same water may generate power several times as it descends.

Name	Operator	Scheme	Location (UK grid reference)	Council area	Gross head (m)	Capacity (MW)	Year commissioned
Achanalt	SSE Renewables	Conon	NH308619	Highland	20	3	1956
Aigas	SSE Renewables	Affric-Beauly	NH474436	Highland	18	20	1962
Allt Fionn	Osspower/Glenfalloch Estate	-	NN331209	Stirling	180	2	2012
Allt-na-Lairige	SSE Renewables	Shira	NN231136	Argyll and Bute	249	6	1956
Allt na Moine	Allt na Moine Hydro Ltd	-	NG692541	Highland		2	2023
Auchtertyre	RWE	-	NN353290	Stirling	-	0.7	2000
Blantyre	Blantyre Hydro Ltd	-	NS695583	South Lanarkshire	-	0.575	1995
Bonnington	Lanarkshire Hydro-Electric Co. / SSEB / Drax Group	Lanark	NS884416	South Lanarkshire	30	11	1927
Black Rock	RWE	-	NH598667	Highland		3.93	2015
Braevallich	RWE	-	NM958073	Argyll and Bute	-	2.2	2006
Carnoch	RWE	-	NM847606	Highland	245	1.35	2006
Carsfad	Drax Group	Galloway	NX604854	Dumfries and Galloway	20	12	1936
Cashlie	SSE Renewables	Breadalbane	NN507419	Perth and Kinross	142	11	1959
Cassley	SSE Renewables	Shin	NC396232	Highland	113	10	?
Ceannacroc	SSE Renewables	Great Glen	NH223108	Highland	90	20	1959
Chliostair	SSE Renewables	Chliostair	NB059091	Western Isles	125	1	1960
Cia Aig	RWE	-	NN176899	Highland	185 / 194	3	2016
Clachan	SSE Renewables	Shira	NN191133	Argyll and Bute	294	40	1955
Clunie	SSE Renewables	Tummel	NN912597	Perth and Kinross	53	61	1955
Cuaich	SSE Renewables	Tummel	NN674876	Highland	27	2.5	1959
Cuileig	SSE Renewables	-	NH179767	Highland	-	3.2	2002
Culligran	SSE Renewables	Affric-Beauly	NH377404	Highland	60	19	1962
Dalchonzie	SSE Renewables	Breadalbane	NN740219	Perth and Kinross	29	4	1958
Deanie	SSE Renewables	Affric-Beauly	NH291387	Highland	113	38	1963
Douglas Water	RWE	-	NN054054	Argyll and Bute	173	3	2008
Drumjohn	Drax Group	Galloway	NX521973	Dumfries and Galloway	-	2	1985
Earlstoun	Drax Group	Galloway	NX614818	Dumfries and Galloway	20	14	1936
Errochty	SSE Renewables	Tummel	NN772593	Perth and Kinross	186	75	1955
Fasnakyle	SSE Renewables	Affric-Beauly	NH318295	Highland	159	69	1951
Finlarig	SSE Renewables	Breadalbane	NN585345	Perth and Kinross	415	16.5	1955
Foyers Falls	SSE Renewables	Foyers	NH503217	Highland	108	5	1896 reconf. 1971
Garrogie	Innogy	-	NH500132	Highland	-	2.4	2005
Garry Gualach	Innogy	-	NH170004	Highland	-	0.78	2002
Gaur	SSE Renewables	Tummel	NN464569	Perth and Kinross	30	7.5	1953
Gisla	SSE Renewables	Gisla	NB128257	Western Isles	47	0.7	1960
Glen Noe	RWE	Glen Noe	NN048341	Argyll and Bute		2	2021
Glen Tarbert	RWE	-	NM865605	Highland	-	0.85	2000
Glendoe	SSE Renewables	Glendoe	NH451031	Highland	600	100	2009
Glenlee	Drax Group	Galloway	NX606805	Dumfries and Galloway	120	24	1935
Glenmoriston	SSE Renewables	Great Glen	NH364156	Highland	93	37	1957
Grudie Bridge	SSE Renewables	Conon	NH320623	Highland	168	18.7	1950
Inverawe	SSE Renewables	Sloy-Awe	NN016321	Argyll and Bute	36	25	1963
Inverbain	RWE	-	NG786549	Highland	-	1	2005
Invergarry	SSE Renewables	Great Glen	NH319013	Highland	53	20	1956
Inverlael	RWE	-	NH189854	Highland	120	2.5	2009
Kendoon	Drax Group	Galloway	NX604876	Dumfries and Galloway	46	24	1936
Kerry Falls	SSE Renewables	-	NG829719	Highland	56	1	1952
Kilmelfort	SSE Renewables	Kilmelfort	NM832141	Argyll and Bute	111	2	1956
Kilmorack	SSE Renewables	Affric-Beauly	NH494442	Highland	17	20	1962
Kingairloch	SSE Renewables	-	NM836532	Highland	-	3.5	2005
Kinlochleven	GFG Alliance (prev.Rio Tinto Alcan)	-	NN190618	Highland	285	30	1909
Lairg	SSE Renewables	Shin	NC575069	Highland	10	3.5	1959
Lednock	SSE Renewables	Breadalbane	NN698303	Perth and Kinross	91	3	1961
Livishie	SSE Renewables	Great Glen	NH353159	Highland	259	15	1962
Loch Dubh	SSE Renewables	Loch Dubh	NC149012	Highland	166	1.2	1955
Loch Eilde Mor	Green Highland Renewables	-	NN194618	Highland		2.0	2017
Loch Ericht	SSE Renewables	Tummel	NN553727	Perth and Kinross	55	2.2	1962
Loch Gair	SSE Renewables	Loch Gair	NR924908	Argyll and Bute	109	6	1961
Loch na Laoirgh	Gilkes Energy	-	NH016397	Highland	50	0.95	2017
Lochaber	GFG Alliance (prev.Rio Tinto Alcan)	Lochaber	NN127751	Highland	-	65	1944
Lochay	SSE Renewables	Breadalbane	NN545349	Perth and Kinross	180	45	1958
Lubreoch	SSE Renewables	Breadalbane	NN453417	Perth and Kinross	30	4	1958
Luichart	SSE Renewables	Conon	NH394570	Highland	56	34	1954
Lussa	SSE Renewables	Lussa	NR735260	Argyll and Bute	116	2.4	1952
Morar	SSE Renewables	Morar	NM683922	Highland	5	1	1948
Mossford	SSE Renewables	Conon	NH330633	Highland	161	18.6	1957
Mucomir	SSE Renewables	Great Glen	NN183839	Highland	7	1.95	1962
Mullardoch	SSE Renewables	Affric-Beauly	NH222309	Highland	27	2.4	1955
Nant	SSE Renewables	Sloy-Awe	NN015208	Argyll and Bute	172	15	1963
Nostie Bridge	SSE Renewables	Lochalsh	NG852272	Highland	149	1	1948
Orrin	SSE Renewables	Conon	NH436545	Highland	222	18	1959
Pattack	Gilkes Energy	-	NN528886	Highland	150	5	2017
Pitlochry	SSE Renewables	Tummel	NN935577	Perth and Kinross	15	15	1950
Quoich	SSE Renewables	Great Glen	NH107011	Highland	101	18	1955
Rannoch	SSE Renewables	Tummel	NN529582	Perth and Kinross	156	44	1930
River E	RWE	-	NH521164	Highland	287	3	2007
Shin	SSE Renewables	Shin	NH573974	Highland	81	18.6	1958
Sloy	SSE Renewables	Sloy	NN320098	Argyll and Bute	277	152.5	1950
Sron Mor	SSE Renewables	Shira	NN161200	Argyll and Bute	46	5	1957
St Fillans	SSE Renewables	Breadalbane	NN690246	Perth and Kinross	253	16.8	1957
Stanley Mills	Redeveloped by Innogy	-	NO114328	Perth and Kinross	-	0.84	2003
Stonebyres	Lanarkshire Hydro-Electric Co. / SSEB / Drax Group	Lanark	NS850441	South Lanarkshire	51	5	1927
Storr Lochs	SSE Renewables	Storr Lochs	NG500506	Highland	136	2.4	1952
Strathan	Gilkes Energy	-	NG942378	Highland	177	0.5	2017
Striven	SSE Renewables	Striven	NS056839	Argyll and Bute	123	8	1951
Taodail	Gilkes Energy	-	NG946422	Highland	101	1.35	2017
Tongland	Drax Group	Galloway	NX694535	Dumfries and Galloway	32	33	1935
Torr Achilty	SSE Renewables	Conon	NH446545	Highland	16	15	1954
Trinafour	SSE Renewables	Tummel	NN724647	Perth and Kinross	91	0.5	1959
Tummel Bridge	SSE Renewables	Tummel	NN763590	Perth and Kinross	53	34	1935
Uisge Dubh	Gilkes Energy	-	NH000366	Highland	85	2	2017

== Wind power ==
=== Onshore ===
Name	Operator	Location (UK grid ref.)	Council area	Number of turbines	Capacity (MW)	Date commissioned	Notes
Burnfoot Hill	EDF Renewables	NN905034	Stirling	13	26	October 2010	
Upper Ardgrain		NJ960344	Aberdeenshire	3	2.4	October 2010	
Ben Aketil extension	Falck Renewables	NG330461	Highland	2	4.6	October 2010	
Achany Estate	SSE Renewables	NC504044	Highland	19	38	October 2010	
Hammars Hill	Hammars Hill Energy Ltd	HY384235	Orkney	5	4.5	September 2010	
Tullo	Eneco	NO757716	Aberdeenshire	7	17	September 2010	
Methil Docks	The Hydrogen Office	NT375993	Fife	1	0.75	September 2010	
Crystal Rig 2	Fred Olsen Renewables Ltd	NT656683	Scottish Borders	51	117.3	September 2010	
Crystal Rig 2a	Fred Olsen Renewables Ltd	NT660680	Scottish Borders	9	20.7	September 2010	
House o'Hill		NJ976585	Aberdeenshire	3	2.4	July 2010	
Cairnmore Farm	RWE Npower Renewables	NJ503244	Aberdeenshire	3	2.55	July 2010	
Carcant	SSE Renewables	NT364525	Scottish Borders	3	6	June 2010	
Toddleburn	SSE Renewables	NT494535	Scottish Borders	12	27.6	June 2010	
Craigengelt Hill	GDF Suez	NS723866	Stirling	8	20	March 2010	
Tiree Community Wind Turbine	Tiree Renewable Energy Ltd	NM076483	Argyll and Bute	1	0.9	March 2010	
Fairburn Estate	SSE Renewables	NH416519	Highland	20	40	February 2010	
Hill of Fiddes	Broadview Energy	NJ932250	Aberdeenshire	3	6.9	February 2010	
Boyndie extension	Falck Renewables	NJ640619	Highland	1	2.3	January 2010	
Pates Hill	Your Energy	NS965605	West Lothian	7	14	January 2010	
North Rhins	AES Wind Generation	NX020568	Dumfries and Galloway	11	22	January 2010	
Edinbane	Vattenfall	NG346462	Highland	18	41.4	December 2009	
Skelmonae		NJ889396	Aberdeenshire	4	3.2	December 2009	
Strath of Brydock extension	A.J. Duncan	NJ653599	Aberdeenshire	1	2.3	December 2009	
Cowhill		NJ746336	Aberdeenshire	1	0.8	December 2009	
Newstead		NJ813503	Aberdeenshire	1	0.8	December 2009	
Ednie Farm		NK087511	Aberdeenshire	1	0.8	December 2009	
Burgar Hill extension	Burgar Hill Renewables	HY341265	Orkney	1	2.3	November 2009	
Dun Law extension	ScottishPower	NT461574	Scottish Borders	35	29.75	October 2009	
Longpark	EDF Renewables	NT474424	Scottish Borders	19	38	October 2009	
Holodyke	DC & MC Wallace	HY319215	Orkney	1	0.9	October 2009	
Hill of Burns		NJ742350	Aberdeenshire	1	0.8	October 2009	
Westray Community wind turbine	Westray Development Trust	HY437460	Orkney	1	0.9	October 2009	
Lochhead Farm	A7 Energy Ltd	NS778474	South Lanarkshire	3	6.15	July 2009	
Clyde Wind Farm	SSE Renewables		South Lanarkshire	206	522	2012+2017	
Hill of Balquhindachy extension	Greenspan Energy	NJ857425	Aberdeenshire	2	1.7	July 2009	
St John's Wells	St John's Wells Wind Farm Limited	NJ800369	Aberdeenshire	3	2.4	July 2009	
Beinn Tharsuinn extension (Beinn nan Oighrean)	RockBySea & Midfern Renewables	NH614815	Highland	2	4.6	July 2009	
Ardkinglas/Clachan Flats	ScottishPower	NN175145	Argyll and Bute	9	15.03	June 2009	
Strath of Brydock	A.J. Duncan	NJ653599	Aberdeenshire	2	4.6	June 2009	
Achairn Farm	J & R Innes	ND305504	Highland	3	6.15	May 2009	
Aikengall	Community Windpower	NT714704	East Lothian	16	48	2009	
Ardrossan	Ventient Energy	NS232471	North Ayrshire	12	24	2003	
Artfield	SSE Renewables	NX225675	Dumfries and Galloway	15	22	2005	
Balnamoon	Balnamoon Renewables Ltd.	NJ484555	Moray	1	0.8	2008	
Beinn an Tuirc	ScottishPower	NR746367	Argyll and Bute	46	30.36	2002	
Beinn Ghlas	Ventient Energy	NM975258	Argyll and Bute	14	8.4	1999	
Beinn Tharsuinn	ScottishPower	NH614814	Highland	17	30	2006	
Ben Aketil	Falck Renewables	NG330445	Highland	10	23	2007	
Bilbster (Flex Hill)	Npower	ND271518	Highland	3	3.9	2008	
Black Hill	RES	ND229446	Scottish Borders	22	28.6	2007	
Black Law	ScottishPower	NS897539	North Lanarkshire; South Lanarkshire; West Lothian	54	124.2	2005, extended 2006	
Bowbeat	E.ON UK	NT302455	Scottish Borders	24	31.2	2002	
Boyndie	Falck Renewables	NJ621639	Aberdeenshire	7	14	2006	
Braes of Doune	Airtricity	NN719107	Stirling	36	72	2005	
Bu Farm	I & H Brown	HY621218	Orkney	3	2.7	2002	
Buolfruich	Anthony Hall	ND160355	Highland	15	12.75		
Burgar Hill	Npower	HY346256	Orkney	2	5	2007	
Burra Dale	Shetland Aerogenerators	HU424424	Shetland	5	3.7	2000, extended 2003	
Cairn Uish (Rothes)	Fred Olsen Renewables	NJ184505	Moray	22	50.6	2005	
Causeymire	Npower	ND155505	Highland	24	55	2004	
Craig	Craig Wind Farm Co.	NX019569	Dumfries and Galloway	4	8	2007	
Cruach Mhor	ScottishPower	NS035874	Argyll and Bute	35	29.75	2004	
Crystal Rig	Fred Olsen Renewables	NT678679	Scottish Borders	25	62.5	2004, extended 2007	
Dalswinton	SSE Airtricity	NX950889	Dumfries and Galloway	15	30	2008	
Deucheran Hill	E.ON UK	NR761442	Argyll and Bute	9	15.75	2001	
Drumderg	SSE Renewables	NO179553	Perth and Kinross	16	32	2008	
Dummuie	Eco2	NJ563357	Aberdeenshire	7	10.4	2007	
Dun Law	ScottishPower	NT466572	Scottish Borders	26	17.6	2000	
Earlsburn	Falck Renewables	NS696884	Stirling	15	37.5	2007	
Farr	Npower	NH734289	Highland	40	92	2006	
Findhorn Ecovillage	Findhorn Wind Park	NJ058640	Moray	4	0.75	2006	
Fintry	FREE	NS616867	Stirling	1	2.5	2007	
Forss	Fivestone	ND019695	Highland	6	7	2003	
Gigha	Gigha Renewable Energy Company	NR637472	Argyll and Bute	3	0.675	2004	
Glens of Foudland	Centrica	NJ613360	Aberdeenshire	20	26	2005	
Greendykeside	A7 Energy	NS811703	North Lanarkshire	2	4	2007	
Green Knowes	ScottishPower	NN965070	Perth and Kinross	18	27	2008	
Hadyard Hill	SSE Renewables	NX264992	South Ayrshire	52	120	2006	
Hagshaw Hill	ScottishPower	NS789307	South Lanarkshire	46	42	1995 ext. 2008	
Hare Hill	ScottishPower	NS654097	East Ayrshire	20	13.2	2000	
Kilbraur	Falck Renewables	NC785075	Western Isles	19	47.5	2008	
Liniclate	Element Wind Ltd.	NF786498	Western Isles	1	0.9	2008	
Mackie's	Mackie's Ice Cream	NJ763319	Aberdeenshire	3	2.55	2007	
Michelin Tyre Factory	Ecotricity	NO448328	Dundee	2	4	2006	
Millennium (Glenmoriston)	Falck Renewables	NH271077	Highland	20	50	2008	
Minsca Farm	SSE Airtricity	NY225810	Dumfries and Galloway	16	36.8	2008	
North Redbog	Redbog Renewables Ltd/Enercon	NJ996552	Aberdeenshire	2	1.6	2008	
Novar (Bendealt)	RWE	NH554714	Highland	50	53.8	1997	
Paul's Hill	Fred Olsen Renewables	NJ114404	Moray	24	55.2	2006	
Sainsbury's, East Kilbride	Ecotricity	NS641514	South Lanarkshire	1	0.6	2001	
Sigurd	Triodos Renewables	HY346256	Orkney	1	1.3	2000	
Spurness	SSE Renewables	HY604343	Orkney	4	11	2005	
Tangy Farm	SSE Renewables	NR678286	Argyll and Bute	15	12.75	2002	
Wardlaw (Dalry)	Community Windpower	NS251517	North Ayrshire	6	18	2006	
Wether Hill	ScottishPower	NX691939	Dumfries and Galloway	14	18.2	2007	
Whitelee	ScottishPower	NS575465	East Ayrshire; East Renfrewshire; South Lanarkshire	215	539	2009 ext. 2013	
Windy Standard	Npower	NS618016	Dumfries and Galloway	36	21.6	1996	

=== Offshore ===
More comprehensive details are available at List of offshore wind farms in the United Kingdom.

Name	Operator	Location (UK grid ref.)	Sea area	Number of turbines	Capacity (MW)	Date commissioned
Beatrice (Demonstrator)	Talisman Energy / SSE Renewables	ND361006	Moray Firth	2	10	2007
Beatrice	SSE Renewables; Copenhagen Infrastructure Partners; Red Rock Power Limited	ND361006	Moray Firth	84	588	2018
Robin Rigg	E.ON UK	NX899420	Solway Firth	60	180	2009
Hywind Scotland	Equinor / Masdar	OG213845	15 miles (24 km) from Peterhead	5	30	2017

== Others ==
Name	Operator	Location (UK grid ref.)	Council area	Type	Capacity (MW)	Date commissioned	Date closed	Ref.
Billia Croo	EMEC	HY222093	Orkney	Wave power (test site)	7 (Note: No wave power devices currently installed)	2003	-	
Braehour	Scottish Hydro Electric	ND093532	Highland	Peat burning	?	1954	1960	
Baldovie	Dundee Energy Recycling	NO448329	Dundee	Energy from waste	10.5	1999	-	
Fall of Warness	EMEC	HY534298	Orkney	Tidal power (test site)	10 (Note: Consented to test up to 10MW, installed capacity varies)	2006	-	
Greengairs	Shanks McEwan	NS786697	North Lanarkshire	Landfill gas	3.8	1996	-	
Islay LIMPET	Wavegen	NR158533	Argyll and Bute	Wave power	0.5	2000	2012	
MeyGen	SAE	ND348751	Orkney	Tidal power	6.0	2016	-	
Shetland Tidal Array, Bluemull Sound	Nova Innovation	HP556023	Shetland	Tidal power	0.3 (Note: Up to 0.6MW has operated at this site, 0.3MW decommissioned)	2016	-	
Steven's Croft	E.ON UK	NY121853	Dumfries and Galloway	Biomass (wood)	44	2008	-	
Westfield	Energy Power Resources	NT193981	Fife	Biomass (poultry litter)	10	2000	-	

== See also ==
- List of largest power stations
- List of power stations in England
- List of power stations in Northern Ireland
- List of power stations in Wales
- List of onshore wind farms in the United Kingdom
- List of offshore wind farms in the United Kingdom
- ScottishPower
- South of Scotland Electricity Board
- North of Scotland Hydro-Electric Board

== Bibliography ==
- Payne, Peter L (1988). The hydro: a study of the development of the major hydro-electric schemes undertaken by the North of Scotland Hydro-Electric Board. Pergamon. ISBN 978-0-08-036584-8.
