= Earba Storage Project =

Proposed Scottish energy storage project

- Country: Scotland, UK
- Location: Grampian Mountains
- Coordinates: 56.885°N 4.468°W
- Status: Proposed

Power generation
- Nameplate capacity: 1.8 GW
- Storage capacity: 40 GWh

The Earba Storage Project is a proposed pumped-storage hydroelectricity (PSH) scheme in the Scottish Highlands. If built, the project will be the largest pumped-hydro scheme in Scotland and the UK, storing 40GWh of energy with a maximum generating capacity of 1.8GW. This is around 22 hours at full power.

The scheme is being developed by Gilkes Energy, a subsidiary of the Kendal-based turbine manufacturer Gilbert Gilkes & Gordon.

Earba is one of three pumped storage projects, all in Scotland, the UK Government announced in 2026 that it was minded to support.

== Current Status ==
In June 2026 the electricity regulator announced that it was "minded" to award the project a Cap and Floor arrangement for the electricity generated by the project.

This means the project is expected to move ahead. Construction is expected by the early 2030s.

If it proceeds, construction is expected to take around six or seven years.

== Proposals ==
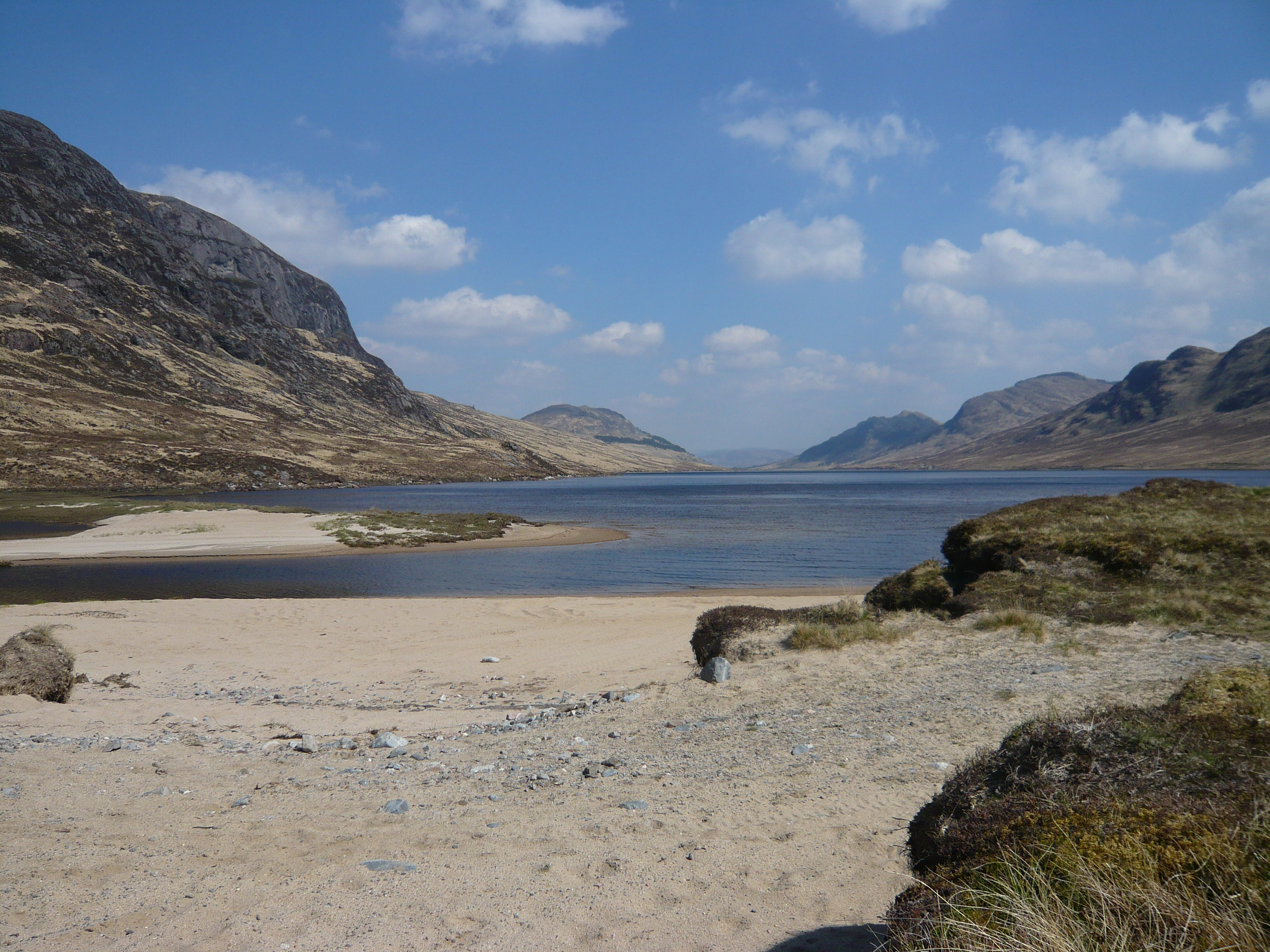
Loch Earba

The scheme is located on the Ardverikie Estate, between Loch Laggan and Loch Ericht, about 37 km (23 mi) east of Fort William and 30 km (19 mi) south-west of Newtonmore. The estate and Ardverikie House were used in the 2000s TV series Monarch of the Glen.

It will use Loch Earba as the lower reservoir, and Loch Leamhain as the upper.

Loch Earba (Gaelic: Lochan na h'Earba) consists of two bodies of water at around 350m above sea level (AOD), lying in a long glacial valley running southwest to northeast. Damming both ends of this valley will create the lower reservoir. When full the lake will be approximately 6km long and 500m across, with a top water level (TWL) at 376m AOD and a bottom water level (BWL) at 358m AOD. A complete generation cycle will therefore raise the water level by 18m over a period of 22 hours.

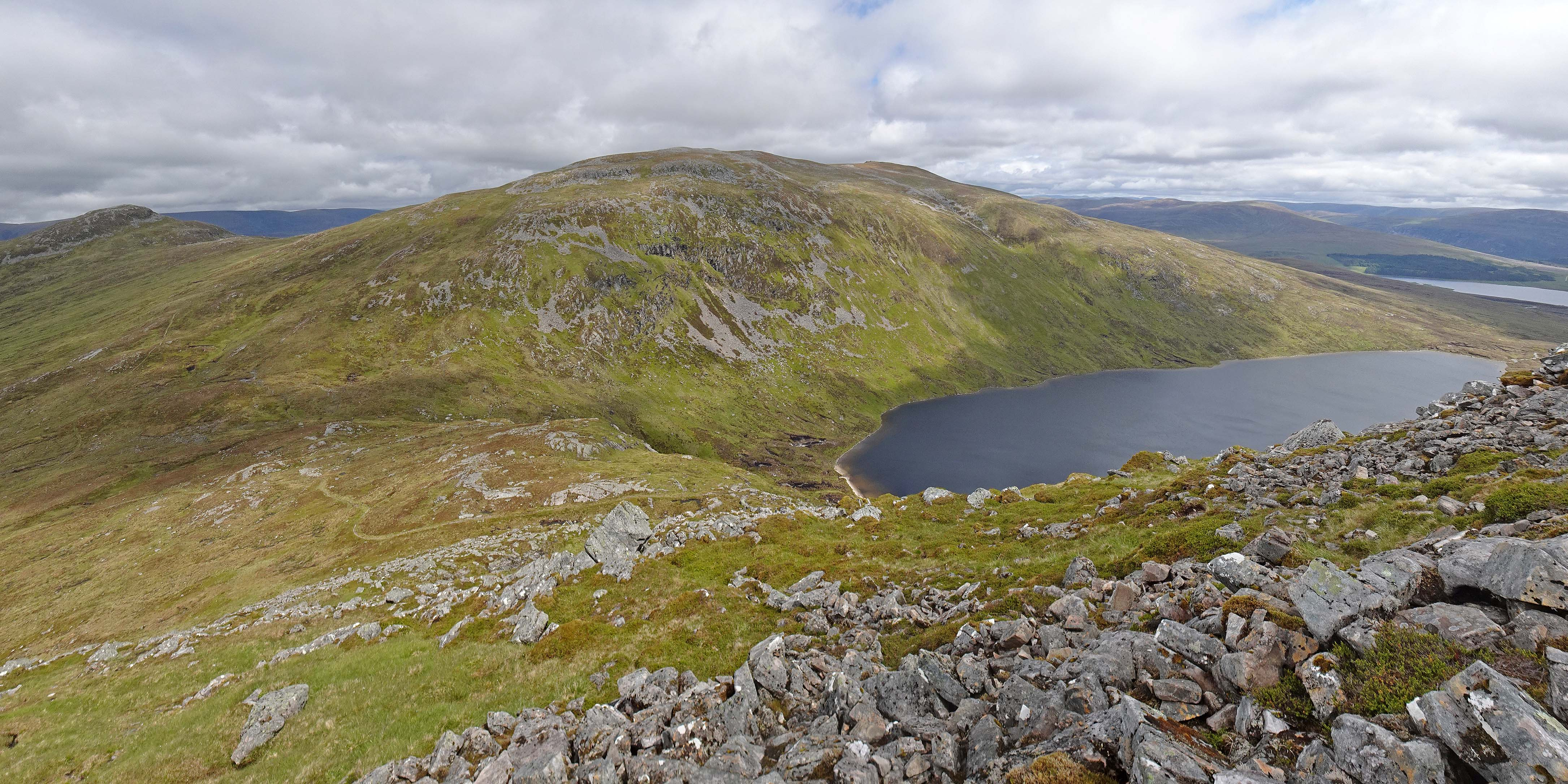
Loch Leamhain that will be dammed to create the upper reservoir

Loch Leamhain (Gaelic: Loch a'Bhealaich Leamhain) is a glacial corrie tarn, in the high mountains to the East of Loch Earba, at an elevation of 635 AOD. The corrie drains towards the southeast. Damming the entrance would create the upper reservoir, raising the level of Loch Leamhain by around 75m to 710m AOD. When full, the reservoir would be around 1.5km long by 1km across.

The power station would be located on the shore of Loch Earba, with 3km long tunnels carrying water to the upper reservoir, beneath the mountain ridge that separates the two lochs.

A 400 kV underground power line would connect the powerhouse to the National Grid with a new substation constructed adjacent to the Beauly-Denny power line. This would be a separate consent by SSEN Transmission.

== Opposition to scheme ==
There has been significant opposition to the scheme, which is located in designated Wild Land and Special Landscape areas. The proposed scheme is close to the Munros of Geal Charn, Creag Pitridh and Beinn a' Chlachair, plus the Ardverikie wall rock climbing area, with Mountaineering Scotland quoted as saying project "raises some significant concerns for climbers and hillwalkers". They also say that there will be "highly visible and intrusive bare draw-down zones around the lochs" due to the rising and falling water levels from the scheme operation.

The John Muir Trust also voiced concerns regarding the drawdown scars and the impact on the perceived wild character of the area, including the Mamores-Alder-Rannoch Wild Land Area in which the scheme is proposed. They say that building large-scale infrastructure in the area will "significantly impact the sense of remoteness, sanctuary, challenge and risk", noting that these are key characteristics of the Wild Land Area designation. While accepting the need for energy storage as part of decarbonisation efforts, the trust questioned the need to build new PSH, citing a 2023 study on Large Scale Electricity Storage from the Royal Society which suggests the bulk of energy storage will be from hydrogen and PSH will only play a marginal role.

== Project history ==
At the scoping stage, the scheme was originally proposed to be rated at 900 MW with 33 GWh of storage (36 hours at full load). This was subsequently increased in the development stage to 1800 MW and 40 GWh of storage (22 hours), making it the largest PSH scheme in the UK (both operational and under development).

The planning application for the scheme was submitted in March 2024.

In March 2025, the project was granted Section 36 planning consent by the Scottish Government.

In September 2025, OFGEM assessed the Earba Storage Project as being eligible for the next stage of the UK government's cap and floor funding mechanism for Long Duration Energy Storage.

According to the project promoters, the next stage of the process was that Ofgem "will select a small number of Long Duration Electricity Storage (LDES) projects to be awarded a cap and floor contract in mid-2026.... Earba is expected to score well in this [selection] process thanks to its scale, its long storage duration (22hrs) and its location and local topography which means it can be delivered at a very competitive capital cost."

== See also ==
- Loch Kemp Storage
- Balliemeanoch Pumped Storage Hydro
- Coire Glas power station
- Fearna Storage project
- Glen Earrach Energy
- List of power stations in Scotland §Pumped-storage hydro-electric
