= Fearna Storage project =

Proposed pumped storage scheme in Scotland

Coordinates: 57.078°N 5.209°W

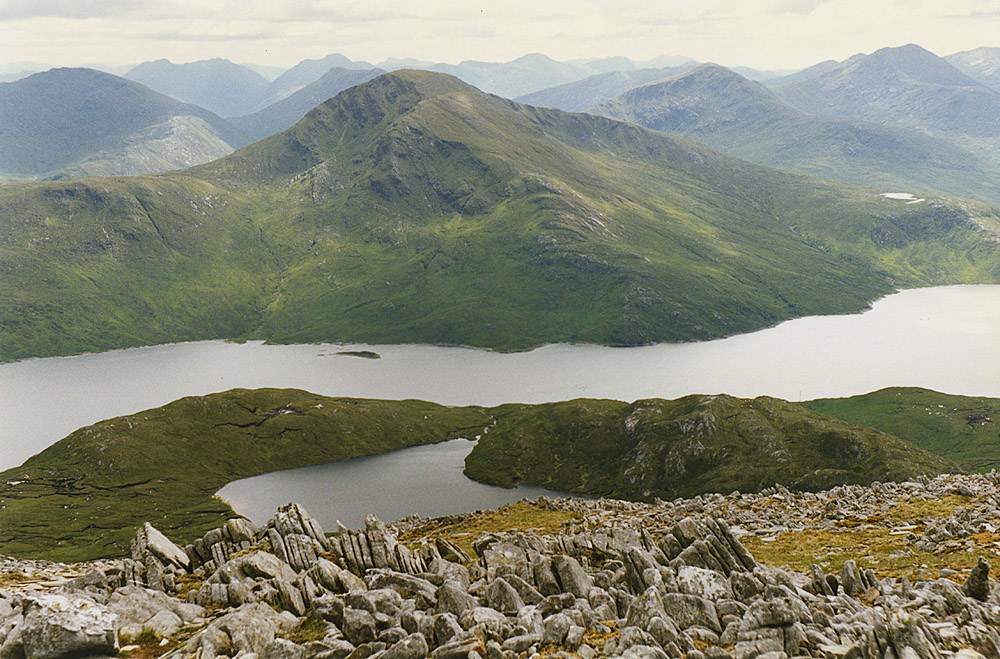
View of Loch Quoich with Loch Fearna, at a much higher elevation in the foreground. The high rock barrier containing Loch Fearna will be dammed to form the upper reservoir

The Fearna Storage project is a proposed pumped storage hydroelectricity (PSH) scheme in the Scottish Highlands. The project is a collaboration between SSE and Gilkes Energy.

If built, the project will be one of the largest pumped-hydro schemes in Scotland, storing 37GWh of energy, equating to 20 hours of generation at the maximum capacity of 1.8GW.

== Geography ==
The project is an extension to the Glen Garry hydroelectric scheme, which includes the reservoir Loch Quoich, situated west of Loch Garry approximately 40 km northwest of Fort William.

Loch Fearna is a small lake roughly 1 km from Loch Quoich. Water from Loch Quoich will be pumped up to Loch Fearna over an average hydraulic head of 376m, with relatively short tunnels needed to connect the two. The water to be displaced would use 11% of the storage capacity of Loch Quoich.

== Current status ==
A planning application under Section 36 of the Electricity Act 1989 was submitted in March 2025. If approved, it is expected that construction and commissioning will take seven years.

== See also ==
- Loch Kemp Storage
- Coire Glas power station
- Balliemeanoch Pumped Storage Hydro
- Earba Storage Project
- Glen Earrach Energy
