= Scottish Power Company Limited =

- Company type: Private company
- Industry: Electricity industry
- Founded: 1909
- Defunct: 1 April 1948
- Fate: Industry nationalisation
- Successor: South East Scotland Electricity Board
- Headquarters: Edinburgh, Scotland
- Area served: Scotland
- Key people: George Balfour (chairman
- Products: Electric power
- Production output: 473 GWh (1948)
- Net income: £348,700 (1947)

The Scottish Power Company Limited was an electricity industry holding company that operated from 1909 until 1948. Its subsidiary companies generated and supplied electricity to up to 136,800 consumers in an area of 13,000 square miles over large parts of Scotland.

== Foundation ==
The Scottish Power Company Limited was incorporated in 1909. Its sole subsidiary at that time was the Scottish Central Electric Power Company which had been established in 1903 under the terms of the Scottish Central Electric Power Act 1903 (3 Edw. 7 ccxli). The Central Company had constructed and operated a power station at Bonnybridge near Falkirk.

=== Management ===
The Scottish Power company's management board in 1927 comprised: Henry Brown (chairman); George Balfour; J.W. Bowhill; Sir T.O. Callender; and Ian C.A. Murray.

In 1937 the board comprised: George Balfour (chairman); Alexander H. Bowhill; Sir T.O. Callender; Ian C.A. Murray; and Kenneth Sanderson. George Balfour died in September 1941 and was succeeded as chairman by William Shearer who remained chairman until 1948.

The company's registered office was 10 Melville Street, Edinburgh.

== Subsidiary Companies ==
The Scottish Power Company went on to acquire the shares and capital of other Scottish electricity undertakings. By 1927 these included:

- Scottish Midlands Electricity Supply Limited
- Grampian Electricity Supply Limited
- North of Scotland Electric Light and Power Company Limited
- Crief Electric Supply Company Limited
- Dunblane and District Electricity Supply Limited

By 1930 the Scottish Power Company had also acquired:

- Fife Electric Power Company
- Arbroath Electric Light and Power Company Limited
- Beauly Electric Supply Company Limited
- Duncan's Electricity Supply Company Limited

By 1937 its subsidiaries also included:

- Elgin Electric Supply Company Limited
- Grantown-on-Spey Electric Supply Company Limited
- Ross-shire Electric Supply Company Limited
- Scottish Southern Electric Supply Company Limited
- Strichen Electrical Supply Company Limited

By 1948 the Power Company had absorbed 21 electricity undertakings and had made arrangements for the acquisition of nine other undertakings. However, these arrangements were abandoned as a consequence of the nationalization of the electricity industry. The Scottish Power Company was dissolved and its power stations and power lines were vested in the South East Scotland Electricity Board.

== Power stations ==
The engineering details of the power stations operated by the subsidiary companies in 1921 were as follows:

Scottish Power Company subsidiaries power stations (1921)
Company	Power station	Generating plant, steam unless stated	Total generating capacity, MW	Electricity supplied, MWh	Maximum Load, kW	Connections
Arbroath	Arbroath	1 × 150 kW, 1 × 300 kW, 1 × 600 kW	1.050	1,115.1	800	2,793
Dunblane	Dunblane	Not operational	–	–	–	–
Duncan's	Aboyne	Not operational	–	–	–	–
Duncan's	Ballater	2 × 42 kW (oil)	84	44.58	40	186
Duncan's	Ellon	2 × 42 kW (oil)	84	50.4	50	240
Fife	Dunfermline	1 × 300 kW, 1 × 1250 kW, 1 × 1500 kW, 1 × 3500 kW, 1 × 5000 kW	16.55	21,149.5	6,408	8,877
Grampian		Not operational	–	–	–	–
North of Scotland	Brechin	2 × 66 kW	132	177.2	129	956
North of Scotland	Inverness	2 × 90 kW, 1 × 150 kW, 1 × 220 kW, 1 × 300 kW	850	818.1	620	2,698
North of Scotland	Montrose	2 × 66 kW, 1 × 75 kW, 1 × 150 kW, 1 × 150 kW	507	406.8	385	1,945
Scottish Midlands		–	–	280.7	200	650

In 1946 the following subsidiary companies and their power stations were operational.

Scottish Power Company subsidiaries power stations (1946)
Company	Power station	Type	Electricity supplied, MWh	Maximum load, kW
Fife	Dunfermline	Steam	7,432	10,850
Grampian	Arbroath	Steam	2,548	4,120
Grampian	Ballater	Oil	1.20	74
Grampian	Broara	Oil	68.6	470
Grampian	Elgin	Oil	83.2	450
Grampian	Fochabers	Oil	2.92	42
Grampian	Lairg	Oil	291.6	160
Grampian	Loch Luichart	Hydro	13,219	2,035
Grampian	Oban	Oil	75.1	950
Grampian	Perth	Steam	442	3,247
Grampian	Rannoch	Hydro	157,273	44,520
Grampian	Tummel	Hydro	113,427	23,950
North of Scotland	Brechin	Steam	3.19	50
Scottish Central	Bonnybridge	Steam	68,625.7	52,770
Scottish Southern	Galashiels	Steam	5,157.3	5,805

== Operations 1910–1948 ==
Outline operational details of the Scottish Power Company over its lifetime are summarised in the table. The data demonstrates the significant growth of the company.

Scottish Power Company key parameters 1910 to 1948
Year	1910	1920	1927	1930	1937	1948
Generating capacity, MW	1.8			80.0	152.322	181.76
Connected load, MW	1.4		22.0	63.790		457.5
Electricity sold, MWh	2,000	13,030 (1922)	26,600	70,000		473,000
Power lines, miles	18.25		150		3,000	5,185
Consumers			1,400	19,264	63,000	136,800
Capital, £	93,174	353,858	3,440,173	4,000,000	6,000,000	15,000,000
Subsidiary companies	1		6	10	15	21

Individual power stations continued to operate following nationalisation. These Included Dunfermline (25.4 MW); Bonnybridge (37 MW); and Galashiels (6.625 MW).

== Financial ==
The capital available to the company is shown on the table above.

Net profit (£1000) from the company's operations

== Dissolution ==
Under the terms of the Electricity Act 1947 the British electricity was nationalized on 1 April 1948. The Scottish Power Company was dissolved and its infrastructure such as power stations and power lines were vested in the South East Scotland Electricity Board.

== See also ==
- South of Scotland Electricity Board
- North of Scotland Hydro-electric Board
- List of power stations in Scotland
