= Loch Kemp Storage =

Proposed pumped-storage hydropower scheme in Scotland

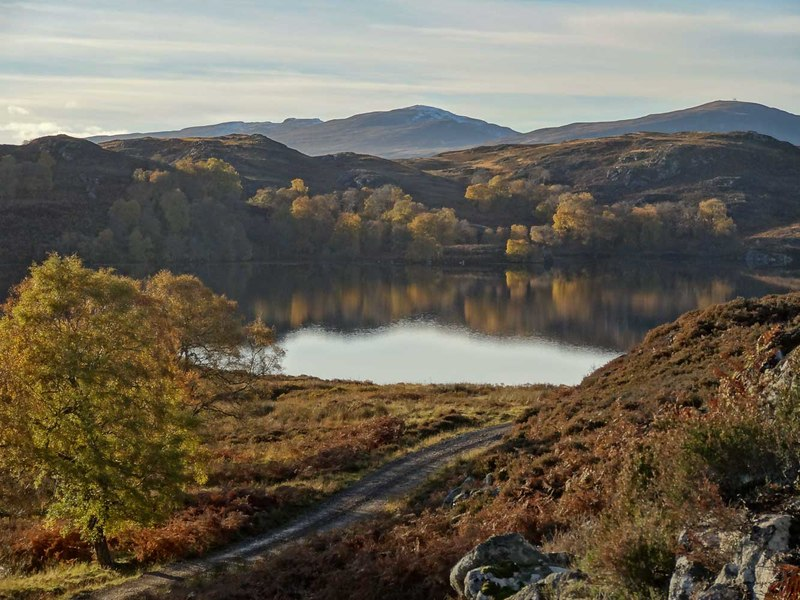
- Loch Kemp, the proposed site of the upper reservoir

- Location within Scotland
- Country: Scotland
- Location: Loch Kemp
- Coordinates: 57.213°N 4.537°W
- Status: Proposed
- Owner: Statera Energy

Power Station
- Hydraulic head: 160 m (520 ft)
- Installed capacity: 600 MW
- Website lochkempstorage.co.uk//
- Upper reservoir: Loch Kemp; Lower body of water: Loch Ness

Loch Kemp Storage is a proposed 600 MW, 22.3 hour duration pumped-storage hydroelectricity (PSH) energy storage scheme in the Scottish Highlands. It would use Loch Ness as the lower reservoir, and Loch Kemp in the hills to the southeast as the upper reservoir.

If built, it would be the first pumped hydro project in the UK since the Dinorwig Power Station in North Wales began operation in 1984.

In June 2026 the electricity regulator announced that it was "minded" to award Loch Kemp Storage a "Cap and Floor" arrangement for the electricity generated by the project. This means the project is expected to move ahead. Construction is expected by the early 2030s.

== Geography ==
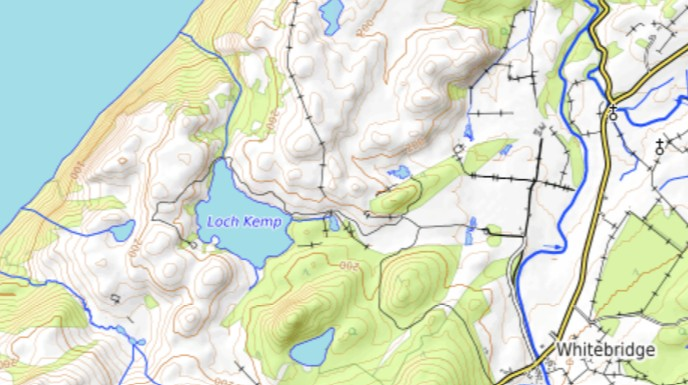
Topographic map of Loch Kemp and part of Loch Ness

Loch Ness lies along the Great Glen of Scotland. It is the largest body of fresh water by volume in Scotland, containing over 7 million cubic metres of fresh water. The elevation varies with the seasons and weather, ranging from 15.25 m above ordnance datum (AOD) (the lowest recorded level) to 16.47 m AOD (top of the normal range). The maximum level recorded at Foyers was 17.71 m AOD in March 2015.

Loch Kemp is a small loch in the hills to the southeast of Loch Ness, between Loch Ness and Whitebridge. It is approximately 700 m long and 400 m wide, lying at an altitude of 177 m AOD.

== Proposals ==
It is proposed to create an upper reservoir approximately 1500 m long by 1500 m wide, by building four new saddle dams and four minor cut-off dams to raise the level of Loch Kemp by 28 m.

A 600 MW shaft-type power plant would be built beside Loch Ness, with a water intake below the loch's level with tunnels and surge shafts connecting to Loch Kemp.

A 275 kV underground cable would connect the power station to the National Grid at Foyers substation, with a switching station close to Dell Farm.

== Ofgem assessment ==
In June 2026, Ofgem assessed the project as the highest ranking of all the 70-plus Long Duration Energy Storage (LDES) projects submitted in the first window of its competition to qualify for Cap and Floor support.

In its assessment of the scheme, Ofgem concluded that:

"Loch Kemp Storage ranked 1st in the Economic Assessment, with a score of 180.12. The project was above the Financial Assessment threshold, and no material concerns were identified in the Strategic Assessment (Scenario Analysis score of -2; Green deliverability rating). Taking these factors together, we are minded-to award this project cap and floor support."

== Opposition to scheme ==
There has been opposition to the scheme, due to the potential cumulative environmental impact on Loch Ness. It has been the third scheme proposed to use Loch Ness as the lower reservoir, in addition to the existing Foyers Pumped Storage scheme and the planned Loch na Cathrach (formerly Red John) to the northeast of Loch Kemp. Combined, the three schemes could alter the level of Loch Ness by 0.73 metres (2 ft 5 in). The Atlantic Salmon Trust claims this could adversely impact endangered wild Atlantic salmon and the developers have not fully assessed the potential risks.

Subsequently, Glen Earrach Energy have submitted proposals for a larger scheme on the opposite shore, increasing the maximum potential change in level of Loch Ness to 1.2 m (3 ft 11 in).

== See also ==
- Coire Glas power station
- Fearna Storage project
- Balliemeanoch Pumped Storage Hydro
- Earba Storage Project
- Glen Earrach Energy
- List of power stations in Scotland §Pumped-storage hydro-electric
