= Sgùrr Mòr =

Several Scottish mountains share the name Sgùrr Mòr:

- Sgùrr Mòr (Fannichs) (1,109 m), a Munro in the north-western Highlands
- Sgùrr Mòr (Loch Quoich) (1,003 m), a Munro in the north-western Highlands
- Sgùrr Mòr (Beinn Alligin) (986 m), a Munro and the highest summit of Beinn Alligin
