= Long duration electricity storage cap and floor =

Proposed UK energy market support mechanism

The long duration electricity storage cap and floor is a proposed UK state support mechanism to encourage the development of more long duration energy storage (Note: The UK Government scheme refers to electricity storage, however technically it is energy storage. The abbreviation LDES may refer to either.) (LDES) on the National Grid. This aims to support future investment in LDES project, such as pumped storage hydroelectricity, which have high up-front capital cost but lower operating costs. The "cap and floor" contracts would offer a top-up when wholesale market prices are below a set "floor", but projects would have to pay back excess profits above the cap. The mechanism would be funded through electricity consumer bill, but Ofgem expect the scheme to be broadly neutral over time on energy bills.

Building more LDES is expected to lower the overall costs of electricity systems, reducing both the need to curtail renewable generation when there is too much and to turn up expensive gas fire generation at times of high electricity demand. It can also provide flexibility and resilience, such as frequency stabilisation and black-start. The cost of limited storage was highlighted during the June 2026 heatwave, when, during a period of high demand and low generation, the National Energy System Operator had to buy imported electricity at £1379/MWh — around 15 times the typical rate on the day-ahead market.

As of 2026, the GB national grid has 2.8 GW of LDES, made up of four pumped storage hydro electric schemes, two in Wales and two in Scotland. As well as more pumped-storage, projects being considered include various forms of batteries and compressed air storage. The first of these projects are expected to start operating in the early 2030s.

Ofgem’s definition for LDES is being able to provide at least eight hours at full power, which is at least 100MW for established technologies (TRL9) in Stream 1 or 50MW for less established technologies in Stream 2 at TRL8. Ofgem clarified at the Energy Storage Summit in February 2026 that the scheme was not about developing new technologies, which should be done using other funding mechanisms.

A similar scheme has operated for electricity inter-connectors since 2014. According to the Government, no floor payments have been made within this, although revenues have been capped and profits shared with consumers.

== History ==
The UK Government launched a consultation on a policy framework to enable investment in long duration electricity storage. This ran from 9 January to 5 March 2024, with the government’s response in October that year.

In October 2024, Energy Minister Michael Shanks launched the Long Duration Electricity Storage investment support scheme.

In September 2025, Ofgem shortlisted 77 projects, from 171 applications. These projects were invited to submit detailed proposals for evaluation, although four projects withdrew.

In June 2026, this shortlist was reduced to 16 projects that the government are minded to support. The final list will be announced in the Autumn following a consultation that closes on 7 August.

== Long duration storage projects ==
In the tables below, capacity refers to the maximum output and duration the longest time at full output, however they are rarely operated like this. Technology abbreviations: pumped storage hydroelectricity (PSH), compressed air energy storage (CAES); Lithium-ion battery energy storage system (Li-ion BESS), Vanadium Flow/Zinc Battery (VFB/Zn).

=== Operational projects ===
Name	Technology	Location	Capacity (MW)	Duration (h)	Commissioned
Ffestiniog	PSH	N Wales	360	4	1963
Cruachan	PSH	W Scotland	400	22	1965
Foyers	PSH	N Scotland	300	21	1974
Dinorwig	PSH	N Wales	1800	5	1984

=== Proposed projects ===
The UK Government announced in June 2026 they were minded to support the following top 16 projects ranked projects, with a total capacity of 7645 MW. This allows for some attrition, while staying within the recommended capacity range of 2.7–7.7 GW.

List of projects "minded to support"
Name	Technology	Location	Capacity (MW)	Duration (h)	Expected operation
Loch Kemp Storage	PSH	N Scotland	660	22.3	2030
Coire Glas power station	PSH	N Scotland	1440	32	2033
TeesCAES	CAES	NE England	50	30	2029
Earba Storage Project	PSH	N Scotland	1800	15	2033
Field Netherton	Li-ion BESS	N Scotland	400	16.3	2030
Field New Deer	Li-ion BESS	N Scotland	400	18.03	2030
Field Rigifa	Li-ion BESS	N Scotland	200	18.03	2030
Field Fyrish	Li-ion BESS	N Scotland	200	16.5	2030
Field Long Stratton	Li-ion BESS	E England	400	16.05	2033
East Claydon Storage	Li-ion BESS	E England	500	12	2030
Ocker Hill BESS	Li-ion BESS	W Midlands	145	8	2029
Sundon Storage	Li-ion BESS	E England	500	8	2030
Drakelow (Innova)	Li-ion BESS	W Midlands	385	8.7	2030
Frontier Legacy	VFB/Zn	N Wales	65	8	2029
Springwell	Li-ion BESS	E Midlands	400	11.1	2030
Thornton BESS 2	Li-ion BESS	E Midlands	100	11.11	2029
