= Lussa Hydro-Electric Scheme =

Power station near Peninver, Scotland

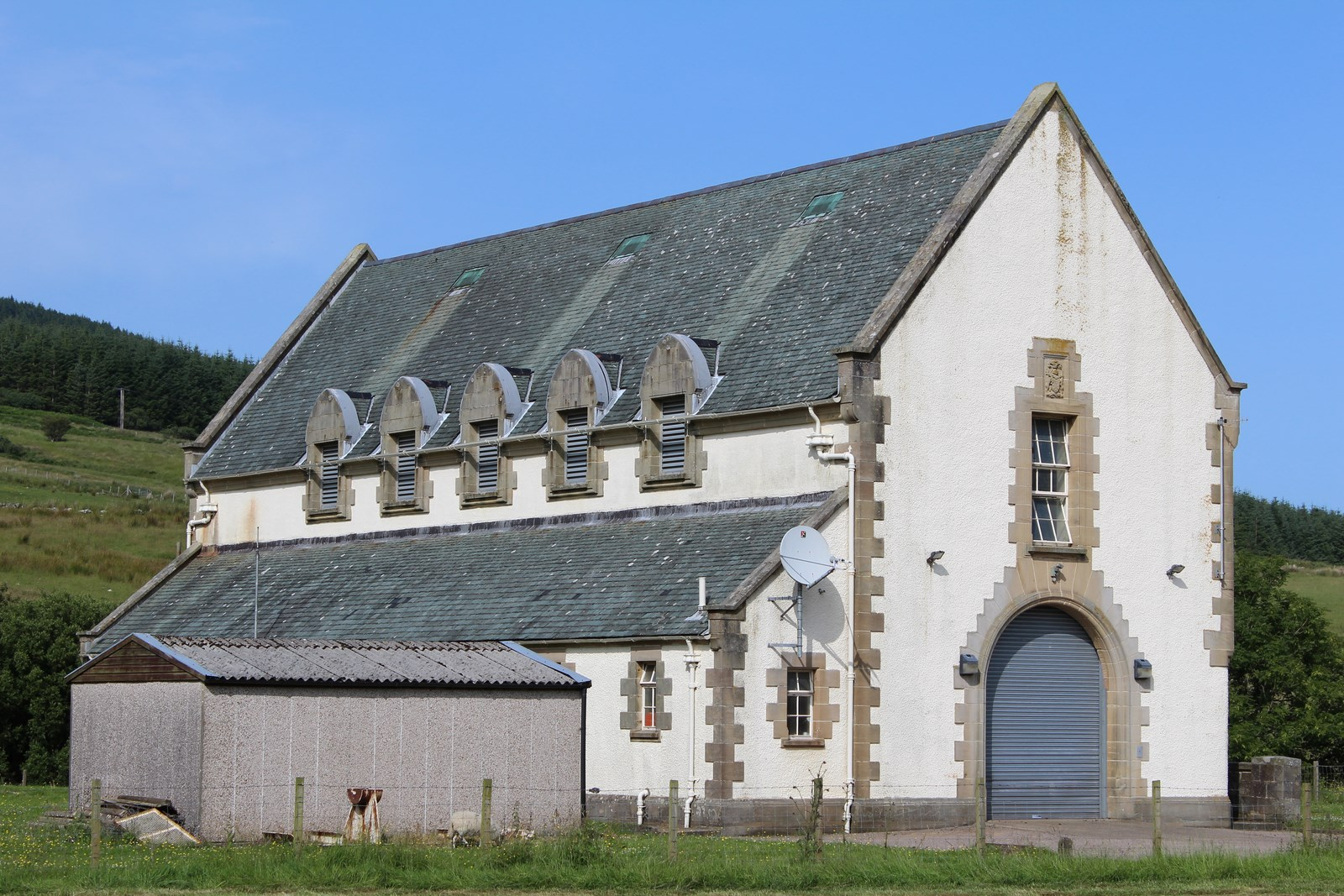
- The Lussa power station

- Location within Argyll and Bute
- Country: Scotland
- Location: Peninver, Argyll and Bute
- Coordinates: 55.4761°N 5.5846°W
- Purpose: Power
- Status: Operational
- Opening date: 1956
- Owner: SSE

Lussa Hydro-Electric Scheme is a small-scale hydro-electric power station, built by the North of Scotland Hydro-Electric Board and commissioned in 1956. It is located near Peninver on the Kintyre peninsula, part of Argyll and Bute in Scotland. It was originally designed to supply power to Campbeltown, but is now connected to the National Grid.

== History ==
The North of Scotland Hydro-Electric Board was created by the Hydro-electric Development (Scotland) Act 1943, a measure championed by the politician Tom Johnston while he was Secretary of State for Scotland. Johnston's vision was for a public body that could build hydro-electric stations throughout the Highlands. Profits made by selling bulk electricity to the Scottish lowlands would be used to fund "the economic development and social improvement of the North of Scotland." Private consumers would be offered a supply of cheap electricity, and their connection to that supply would not reflect the actual cost of its provision in remote and sparsely populated areas.

The chairman of the new Board was to be Lord Airlie, who had initially been critical of the 1943 Act because its scope was too limited. The deputy chairman and chief executive was Edward MacColl, an engineer with wide experience of hydro-electric projects and electrical distribution networks. It soon became clear that MacColl intended to push ahead with the aspirations of the Act at breakneck speeds. He produced a list of 102 potential sites in just three months, and in June 1944, the first constructional scheme was published. This was for the Loch Sloy scheme, which had a ready market for bulk supplies to nearby Clydeside, but it included two smaller schemes, to demonstrate the Board's commitment to supplying remote areas.

Lussa was another small-scale scheme, and when it was commissioned in 1956, it supplied power to Campbeltown. The turbine house was designed by Ian Gordon Lindsay, one of several architects who formed the design panel for the North of Scotland Hydro-Electric Board, and unlike most of the other stations built by the board, it included a pitched roof. Lindsay was particularly fond of Scottish history and Scottish baronial themes, and the resulting structure includes 17th and early 18th century design themes.

To provide a water supply, a dam was constructed across Strathduie Water. It is 130 feet (40 m) long and around40 feet (12 m) high. The central buttressed section is curved and includes a fixed spillway. Lussa Loch formed behind the dam, and as its level rose, two smaller lochs became one. A valve tower on the upstream side of the dam controls the flow of water into a tunnel. The tunnel terminates at a valve house a short distance below the dam, from where a surface pipeline, some 2 miles (3.2 km) long, carries the water to the turbine house, crossing over Glenlussa Water just before it enters the turbines. A branch pipeline joins the main pipeline about two-thirds of the way down. At its upper end is an intake, and there are five sluices on four tributaries of Glenlussa Water, which feed water into the branch pipeline. The tributaries include the Allt Easach, the Allt a'Choire and the Allt Righ. Below the junction is a surge tower, marked as a valve house on the Ordnance Survey map. After passing through the turbines, the water is discharged into Glenlussa Water.

Work on the project started in 1952, and the station can generate 2.4 MW from a head of 381 feet (116 m). The scheme was completed in 1956, and played an important role in demonstrating that the social agenda of the North of Scotland Hydro-Electric Board brought benefit to remote communities. The arrival of electric power in Campbeltown stimulated the local economy. In early 1957, Lord Lucas of Chilworth asked questions in the House of Lords about the costs of Scottish hydro-electricity. Lord Strathclyde stated that for Lussa, the capital cost of the project was £533 per kW, the highest of the 27 schemes mentioned, and considerably higher than the average cost of £175 per kW. The scheme was the North of Scotland Hydro-Electric Board's Constructional Scheme No. 8 and No. 68.

=== Operation ===
In 2002, the Renewables Obligation (Scotland) legislation was introduced. It was conceived as a way to promote the development of small-scale hydro-electric, wave power, tidal power, photovoltaics, wind power and biomas schemes, but by the time it came into force, the definition of small scale had been increased from 5 MW to 10 MW and then 20 MW, and existing hydro-electric stations that had been refurbished to improve efficiency could be included. Lussa at 2.4 MW thus qualified, and between 2002 and 2007 the station qualified for 43,128 Renewable Obligation Certificates, generating a subsidy for SSE of over £2,060,000. Between 2003 and 2007, the station operated at an average load factor of 37.2 percent, although the load factor increased every year during that period.

The power station ran in its original form for around 60 years, but some improvements have been made since 2016. Compensation flow from Lussa Loch maintains the habitat on Glenlussa Water, and in 2016 Gilkes, a subsidiary of Gilbert Gilkes & Gordon of Kendal in Cumbria, supplied a Turgo turbine, a generator and a control system which were installed at the dam. The turbine includes manual spear valves, which were adjusted during the commissioning phase so that the regulated compensation flow is supplied to the river at all levels of the reservoir. A deflector system ensures that the turbine is protected from damage if the load is removed, and the water continues to flow into the river.

In 2021/22, the turbines were replaced, following a two-year consultation period. The Austrian company Andritz AG supplied two new Francis turbines rated at 1.1 MW each, together with two 11 kV synchronous generators. The inlet valves were also replaced, while a new control system and instrumentation were installed as part of the upgrade. The power station is connected to the National Grid by a substation at Campbeltown. For operational reasons, Scottish and Southern Electric (SSE) who own the scheme now class Lussa as part of their Sloy/Awe hydro power scheme.

== Hydrology ==
The surface level of Lussa Loch is 430 feet (131 m) above Ordnance datum (AOD), it covers 0.46 square miles (1.2 km^{2}), and drains an area of 10.64 square miles (27.56 km^{2}). Strathduie Water flows into it from the north, and that collects water from many tributaries, fanning out to the north, east and west. Below the dam, Glenlussa Water flows to the south east and then to the east. It flows over a weir and is crossed by the B842 road before it enters Ardnacross Bay, opposite the Isle of Arran.

== Ecology ==
Although essentially artificial, Lussa Loch, together with three other lochs on the Kintyre peninsula, form the Kintyre Goose Lochs Site of Special Scientific Interest (SSSI). They provide habitat for a large population of roosting Greenland white-fronted geese. With Tangy Loch SSSI, the five lochs are also listed as a wetland of international importance under the Ramsar Convention and a Special Protection Area. During the winter months, roosting geese numbers reach over 2,300, representing around eight per cent of the world population.

== Bibliography ==
- Dekker, Nick (2008). "Public Petition No. PE1184" (PDF). Scottish Parliament. Archived (PDF) from the original on 10 January 2024.
- Fleetwood, David; et al. (2010). Power to the People - The built heritage of Scotland's hydroelectric power. Historic Scotland. ISBN 978-1-84917-036-9.
- Miller, James (2002). The Dam Builders - Power from the Glens. Birlinn. ISBN 978-1-84158-225-2.
- NoSHEB (1948). Constructional Schemes. North of Scotland Hydro-Electric Board.
- Payne, Peter L (1988). The Hydro. Aberdeen University Press. ISBN 978-0-08-036584-8.
- Reeves, Julian, ed. (2018). Power from the Glens - 75th Anniversary edition. SSE. ISBN 978-1-5272-2500-8.
- Swap (June 2005). "Subsidies and Subterfuge" (PDF). Scottish Wind Assessment Project. Archived (PDF) from the original on 11 October 2022.
- Wellhäusser, Kai (2021). "An architectural pearl providing local power". Customer Magazine. Andritz Hydro. Archived from the original on 1 July 2022.
- Whitlock, Robin (1 August 2016). "Gilkes awarded contract for hydro turbines on three SSE sites". Archived from the original on 22 September 2017.
- Wood, Emma (2002). The Hydro Boys. Luath Press. ISBN 978-1-84282-016-2.
