= Turgo turbine =

Design of impulse water turbine

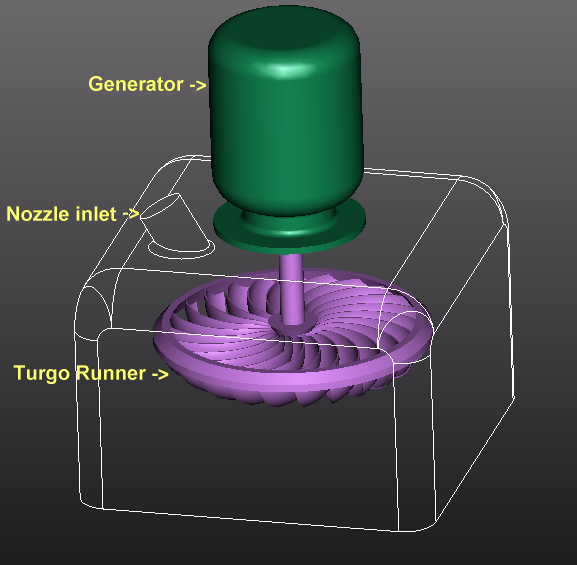
Turgo turbine and generator

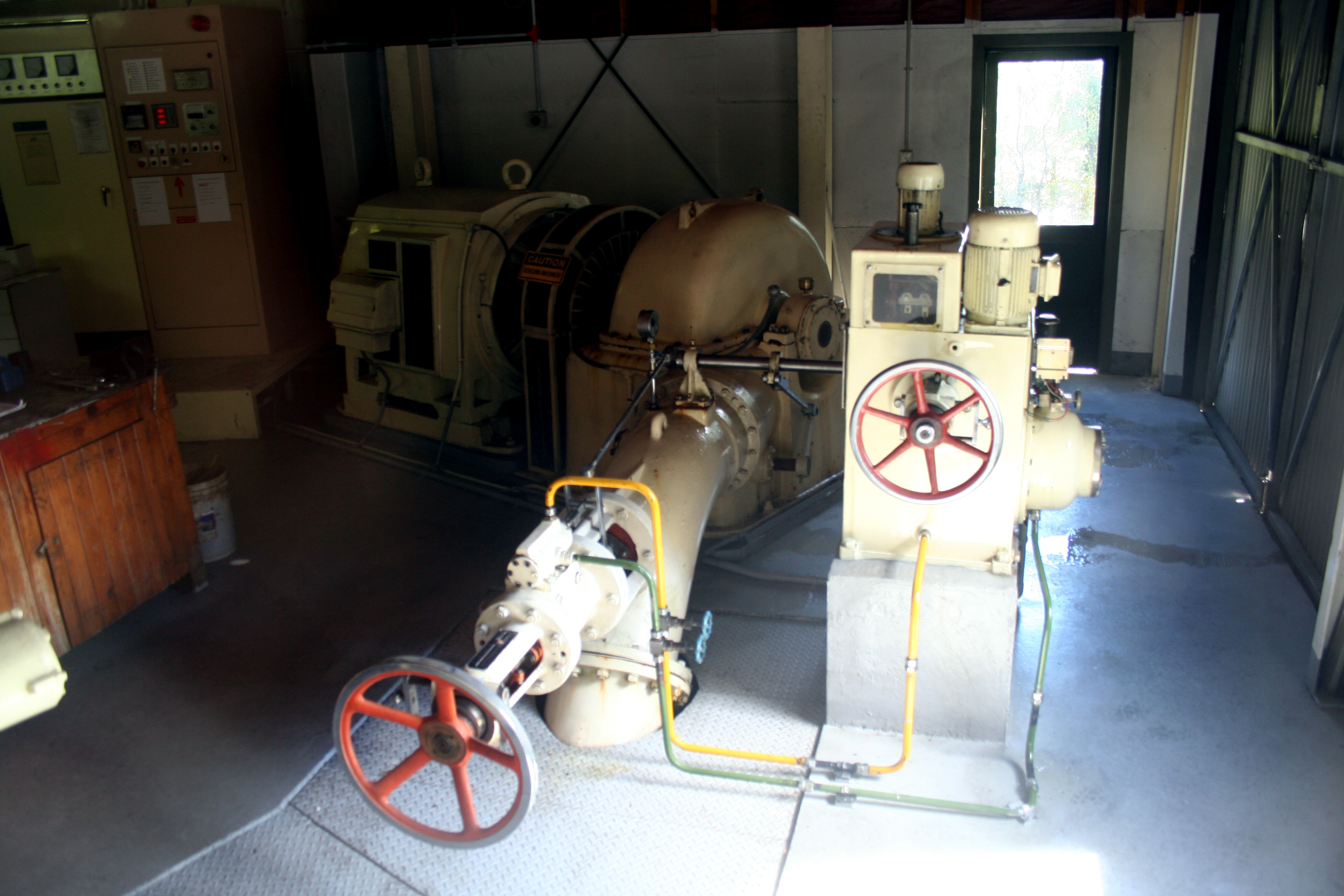
At Milford Sound, New Zealand

The Turgo turbine is an impulse water turbine designed for medium head applications. Operational Turgo turbines achieve efficiencies of about 87%. In factory and lab tests Turgo turbines perform with efficiencies of up to 90%. It works with net heads between 15 and 300 m.

Designed in 1919 by Gilbert Gilkes & Gordon as a modification of the Pelton wheel, the Turgo has some advantages over Francis turbine and Pelton wheel designs for certain applications.

First, the runner is less expensive to make than a Pelton wheel. Second, it doesn't need an airtight housing like the Francis. Third, it has higher specific speed and can handle a greater flow than the same diameter Pelton wheel, leading to reduced generator and installation cost.

Turgos operate in a head range where the Francis and Pelton overlap. While many large Turgo installations exist, they are also popular for small hydro where low cost is very important.

Like all turbines with nozzles, blockage by debris must be prevented for effective operation.

== Theory of operation ==
The Turgo turbine is an impulse type turbine; water does not change pressure as it moves through the turbine blades. The water's potential energy is converted to kinetic energy with a nozzle. The high speed water jet is then directed on the turbine blades which deflect and reverse the flow. The resulting impulse spins the turbine runner, imparting energy to the turbine shaft. Water exits with very little energy. Turgo runners are extremely efficient

A Turgo runner looks like a Pelton runner split in half. For the same power, the Turgo runner is one half the diameter of the Pelton runner, and so twice the specific speed. The Turgo can handle a greater water flow than the Pelton because exiting water doesn't interfere with adjacent buckets.

The specific speed of Turgo runners is between the Francis and Pelton. Single or multiple nozzles can be used. Increasing the number of jets increases the specific speed of the runner by the square root of the number of jets (four jets yield twice the specific speed of one jet on the same turbine).

== See also ==
- Water turbine
- Hydroelectric power
