= Binnein Shuas =

Mountain in Highland, Scotland

Coordinates: 56.910°N 4.527°W

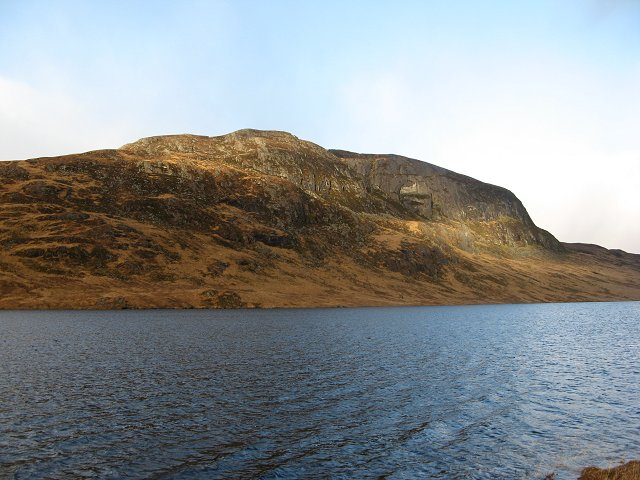
- Binnein Shuas

Highest point
- Elevation: 747 m (2,451 ft)
- Prominence: 391 m (1,283 ft)
- Listing: Graham, Marilyn

Geography
- Location: Inverness-shire, Scotland
- Parent range: Grampian Mountains
- OS grid: NN463827
- Topo map: OS Landranger 34, 42

Binnein Shuas (747 m) is a mountain in the Grampian Mountains of Scotland. It lies between Loch Laggan and Lochan na h-Earba in Inverness-shire.

A steep hill of some character, it is a popular spot for rock-climbers as well as hill walkers, for its cliffs include the very difficult 'Ardverikie Wall'. The nearest village is Kinloch Laggan.
