= Glen Earrach Energy =

Proposed Scottish energy storage project

Coordinates: 57.268°N 4.566°W

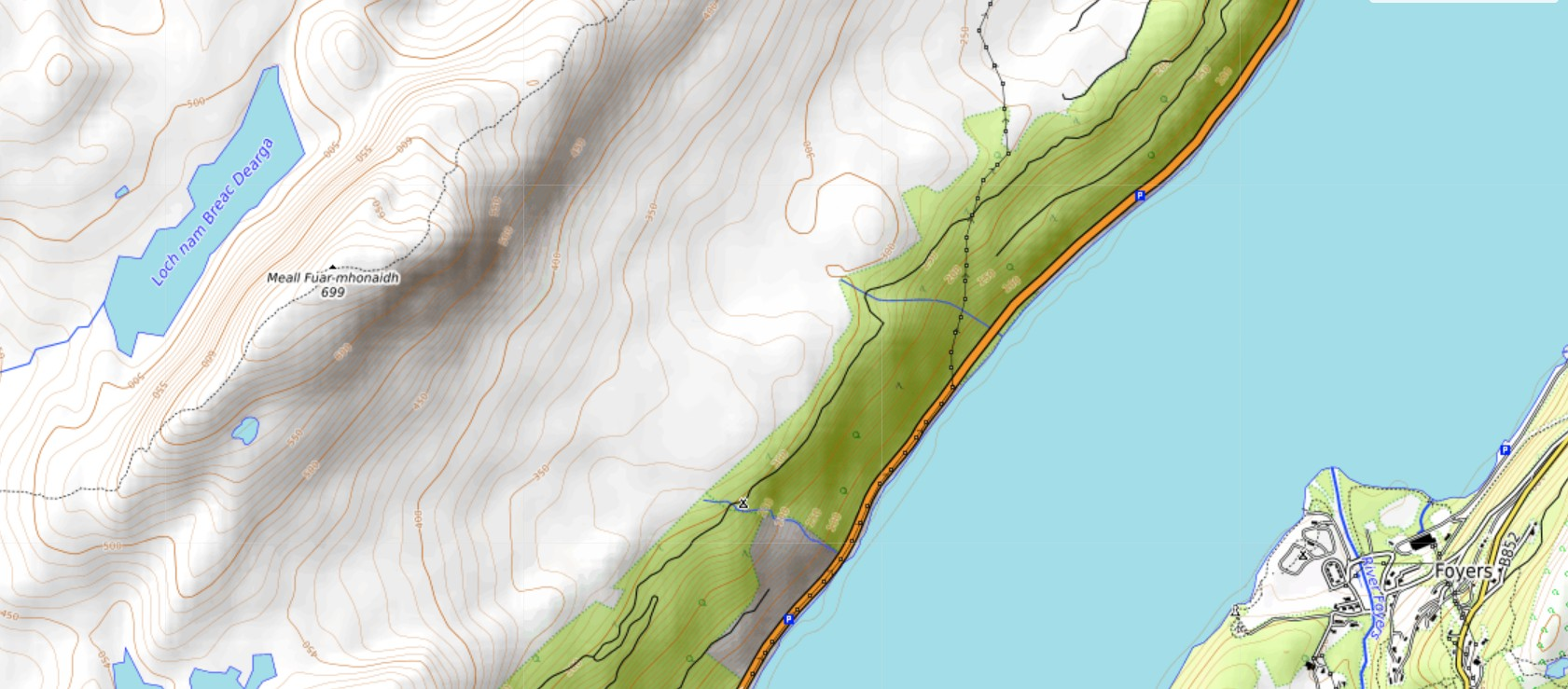
Topograhic map of Loch nam Breac Dearga (left), in the hills above Loch Ness, opposite the village of Foyers (right)

Glen Earrach Energy is a proposed pumped-storage hydroelectricity (PSH) scheme in the Scottish Highlands. If built, the project will be one of the largest pumped-hydro scheme in Scotland, storing 30GWh of energy with a maximum generating capacity of 2.0GW.

== Current Status ==
Public consultations took place in October and November 2024.

The developers plan to soon publish a detailed environmental impact assessment. They aim to start construction in 2026, and hope to deliver first power to the national grid in 2030.

== Proposals ==
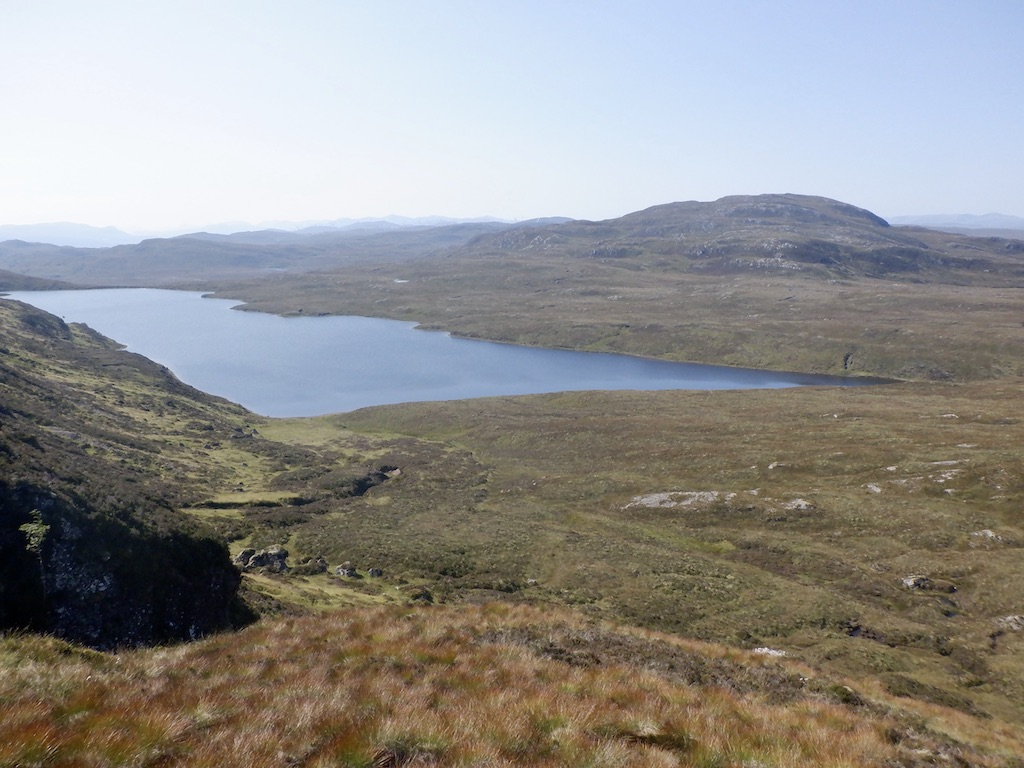
Loch nam Breac Dearga in 2021

The scheme will use Loch Ness as the lower reservoir, and Loch nam Breac Dearga as the upper.

== Economics ==
The scheme will cost in the order of £3 billion.

The economics are favourable because the large height difference between the upper reservoir, at nearly 500 m above sea level, and Loch Ness, which is just 16 m above sea level, and only 3 km distant.

== Criticism ==
The Ness District Salmon Fishery Board has reservations about the impact on water levels in Loch Ness. The Guardian newspaper reports that critics fear the scheme "could significantly affect the [Loch Ness's] delicate ecology, its migrating salmon and trout, its leisure cruising firms and its archaeological sites, including a prehistoric crannog, or human-made island."

== See also ==
- Loch Kemp Storage
- Balliemeanoch Pumped Storage Hydro
- Coire Glas power station
- Fearna Storage project
- Earba Storage Project
