= Sgùrr Mòr (Loch Cuaich) =

Mountain in Scotland

An Sgùrr Mòr
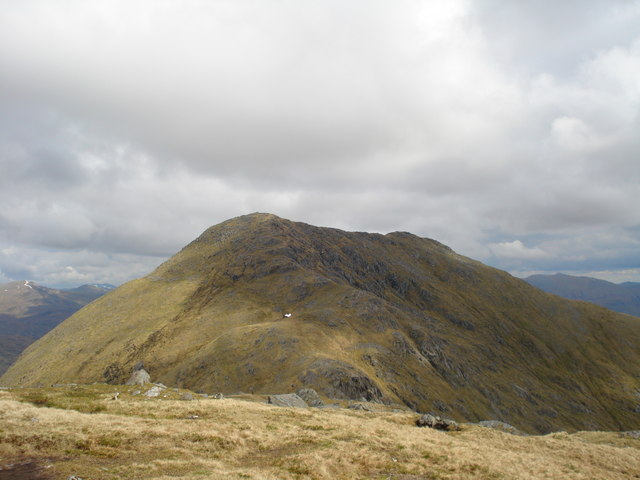

Highest point
- Elevation: 1,003 m (3,291 ft)
- Prominence: 341 m (1,119 ft)
- Listing: Munro, Marilyn
- Coordinates: 57°01′42″N 5°21′15″W

Geography
- Location: Lochaber, Scotland
- Parent range: Northwest Highlands
- OS grid: NM965980
- Topo map: OS Landranger 33, 40

Sgùrr Mòr (in Gaelic An Sgùrr Mòr) is a 1,00m high mountain in the Northwest Highlands of Scotland, on the southern side of Loch Cuaich in Lochaber.

A steep and rugged peak, Sgùrr Mòr is one of the most remote Munros in Scotland and also one of the hardest to reach. It is usually climbed from the head of Loch Arkaig to the south.
