= Coire Glas power station =

Proposed hydroelectric power station in Scotland

Coire Glas Power Station
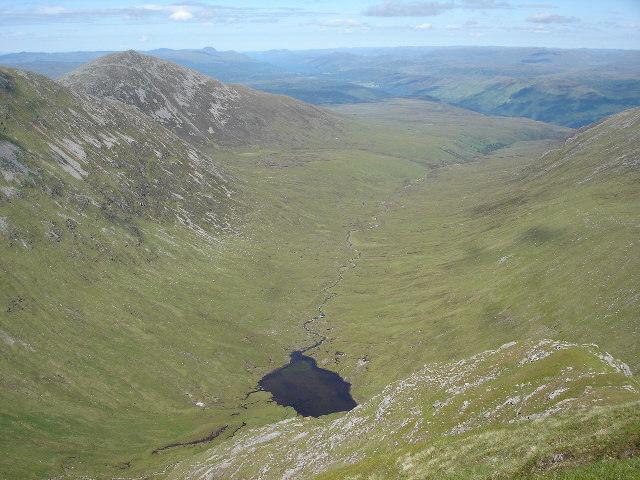
- The proposed site of the upper reservoir at Coire Glas

- Location within Scotland
- Country: Scotland
- Location: Coire Glas
- Coordinates: 57.013°N 4.919°W
- Status: Proposed
- Owner: SSE

Power Station
- Hydraulic head: 500 m (1,600 ft)
- Pump-generators: 4 × 324 MW
- Installed capacity: 1296 MW
- Website www.coireglas.com
- Upper reservoir: Loch a' Choire Ghlais; Lower body of water: Loch Lochy

Coire Glas power station is a proposed 1.3 GW pumped storage hydroelectric power station in the Scottish Highlands. If built, it will double the UK's ability to store energy for long periods.

It is one of three pumped storage hydro projects, all in Scotland, that the UK Government announced it was minded to support, in June 2026.

== Geography ==
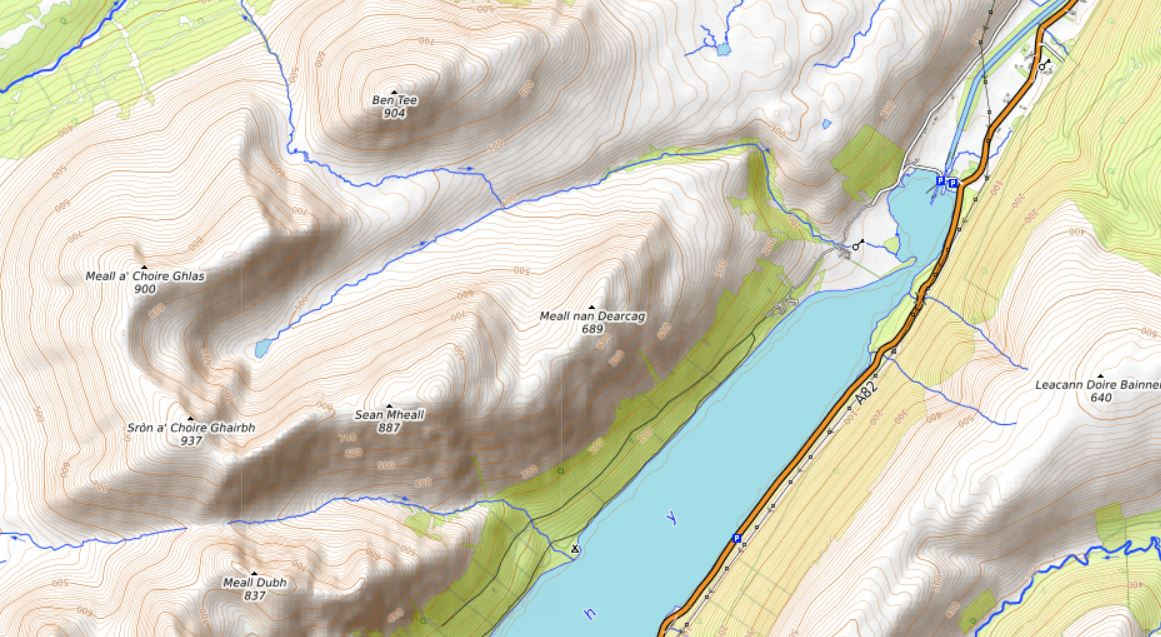
Topographic map of Coire Glas (left centre) and part of Loch Lochy

Loch Lochy lies along the Great Glen of Scotland, at an elevation of 29 m above ordnance datum (AOD).

Above its north-western shore, the Munro mountain Sròn a' Choire Ghairbh reaches a height of 937 m. The northeast slope of the summit forms the headwall of the Coire Glas, a horseshoe-shaped glacial corrie. The corrie tarn, Loch a' Choire Ghlais, lies at an elevation over 500 m AOD.

== Proposal ==
Damming the mouth of the Coire Glas valley will create the upper reservoir. The crest of the dam will be around 700 m long and 92 m above ground level at its tallest point. When full, the reservoir will be approximately 1 km long and 500 m across, with a maximum surface area of 0.63 km^{2}. The water level will vary between 494 m and 558 m AOD. The storable volume of 25.9 million cubic metres, corresponds to a variation of 1.5 m in the level of the 1720 ha Loch Lochy.

A sloping headrace tunnel will take water down from the upper reservoir through the mountain to a vertical high-pressure shaft leading down to turbines located in a cavern within the mountain itself, and thence to an upwards-sloping tailrace discharging into Loch Lochy. The turbines, motor-generator sets and water channels are reversible, so that water from the loch can be pumped back uphill to store electrical energy when needed.

As of May 2023, the power station is planned to have four 324 MW turbines with a total generating capacity of 1300 MW. When full, the system would store 30 GWh of energy, enough for 24 hours of non-stop generation at full output. The power station would be able to switch from standby to stable generation within 30 seconds.

== Grid Connectivity ==
Development of the power station requires significant new grid infrastructure, managed by SSEN Transmission under the "Coire Glas Connection Project." This involves a 400 kV switching station at the site in Glengarry Forest and a 400/132 kV substation at Loch Lundie.

== Geology ==
The Coire Glas site lies within a geologically complex part of the Great Glen. Reporting on the exploratory works states that the site includes two main geological domains: the Great Glen Fault Zone, with heavily sheared and brecciated fault rocks, and the Tarvie Psammite Formation to the north, which consists of more competent meta-sedimentary rocks dominated by psammite. The exploratory adit later encountered a zone of very poor, highly deformed rock, which led to further investigation of the fault zone and changes to the support design.

== Current status ==
The project has been granted planning consent, and sizeable preliminary works have been undertaken, including driving a 1.2 kilometre long exploratory tunnel into the mountainside.

In June 2026 the electricity regulator announced that it was "minded" to award the project a Cap and Floor arrangement for the electricity generated by the project.

This means the project is expected to move ahead. Construction is expected by the early 2030s.

== Project history ==
A smaller 600 MW scheme was first approved in 2013.

In May 2017, SSE submitted a scoping report for a revised Coire Glas scheme, saying it was proposing to increase generating capacity from the consented 600 MW to up to 1,500 MW in order to maximise the potential of the site.

In March 2018, SSE submitted a revised application for the 1.3GW Coire Glas Pumped Storage Scheme

In October 2020, the Scottish Government granted consent for SSE's revised Coire Glas pumped storage scheme, with a maximum generating capacity of up to 1,500 MW.

In May 2022, SSEN Transmission launched the first "Stage 1" public consultation exhibitions in Invergarry and Fort Augustus to present the preferred route for the Coire Glas Connection Project.

In March 2023, SSE announced plans to spend £100M in exploratory work, including drilling a tunnel 1 km into the mountainside to assess the geology.

In 2023, a final investment decision depended on UK government assurances about how the regulated electricity market would reward storage schemes. SSE hoped to make that £1.5bn decision in 2024, in which case the scheme could be completed in 2031.

In January 2024, the UK Government opened a consultation on a policy framework to enable investment in long-duration electricity storage, a process closely watched by developers of Coire Glas.

In October 2024, the UK Government decided to introduce a cap-and-floor scheme for long-duration electricity storage, to be delivered by Ofgem.

In August 2024, the roughly 5-metre-wide and 1.2 km long exploratory tunnel was completed, yielding geological insights for the main construction.

In September 2025, OFGEM assessed the Coire Glas Project as being eligible for the next stage of the UK government's cap and floor funding mechanism for Long Duration Energy Storage (LDES).

== See also ==
- Loch Kemp Storage
- Fearna Storage project
- Balliemeanoch Pumped Storage Hydro
- Earba Storage Project
- Glen Earrach Energy
