= Balliemeanoch Pumped Storage Hydro =

Coordinates: 56.300°N 5.164°W

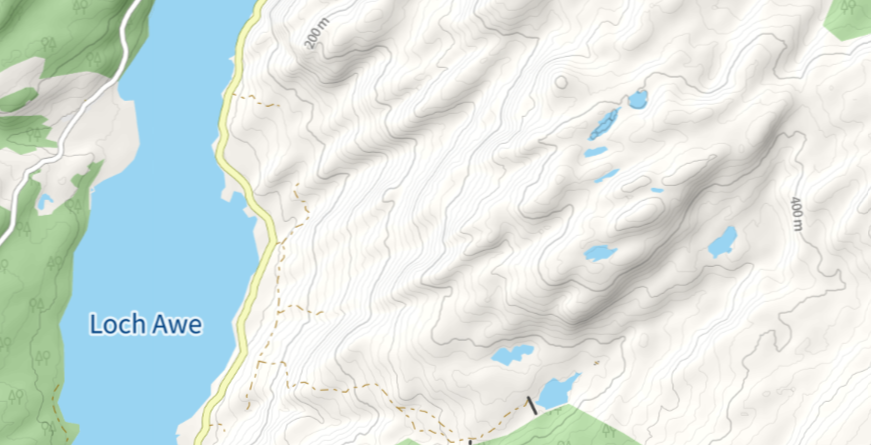
Topograhic map of site of Balliemeanoch pumped storage hydro project. Lochan Airigh is the most easterly body of water, located in a valley which would be dammed to create the upper reservoir

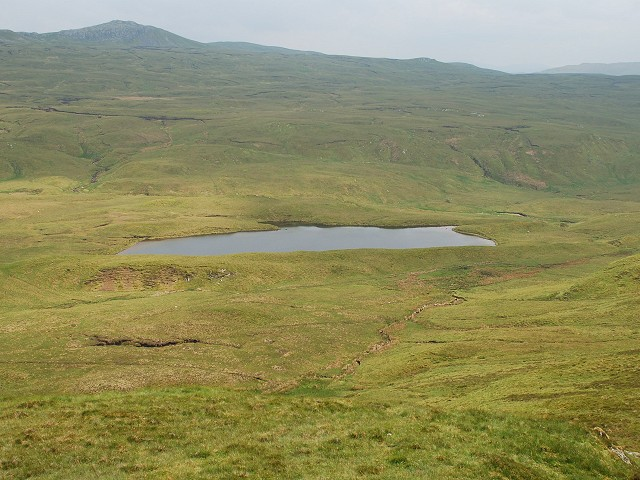
Lochan Airigh viewed from the North West, lying in a wide valley that would contain the upper reservoir

Balliemeanoch Pumped Storage Hydro is a proposed pumped storage hydro (PSH) scheme in the Scottish Highlands.

If built, the project will be the largest pumped-hydro scheme in Scotland, storing 45GWh of energy, equating to 30 hours of generation at the maximum capacity of 1.5GW.

Like the nearby Cruachan Power Station, the project would use the 40km long Loch Awe as the lower reservoir.

In the hills to the East a small mountain lake, Lochan Airigh, lies in a wide valley at approximately 360m above Ordnance Datum (AOD), 9km northwest of Inveraray and 3km east of the village of Balliemeanoch.

The upper reservoir would be created by damming the valley. The proposed dam would be 1500m long and 110m high at its tallest point.

When full the reservoir would be approximately a mile across. The water level, at an elevation of 425m AOD, would be 65m above the current level of Lochan Airigh. The working volume, of up to 58 million m^{3}, corresponds to a 1.5 metre change in the water level of the 38km^{2} Loch Awe.

Surplus electricity from the national grid would be stored by pumping water from Loch Awe up to Lochan Airigh, to be used as required.

== See also ==
- Loch Kemp Storage
- Coire Glas power station
- Fearna Storage project
- Earba Storage Project
- Glen Earrach Energy
