= Loch Garry =

Lake in Highland, Scotland

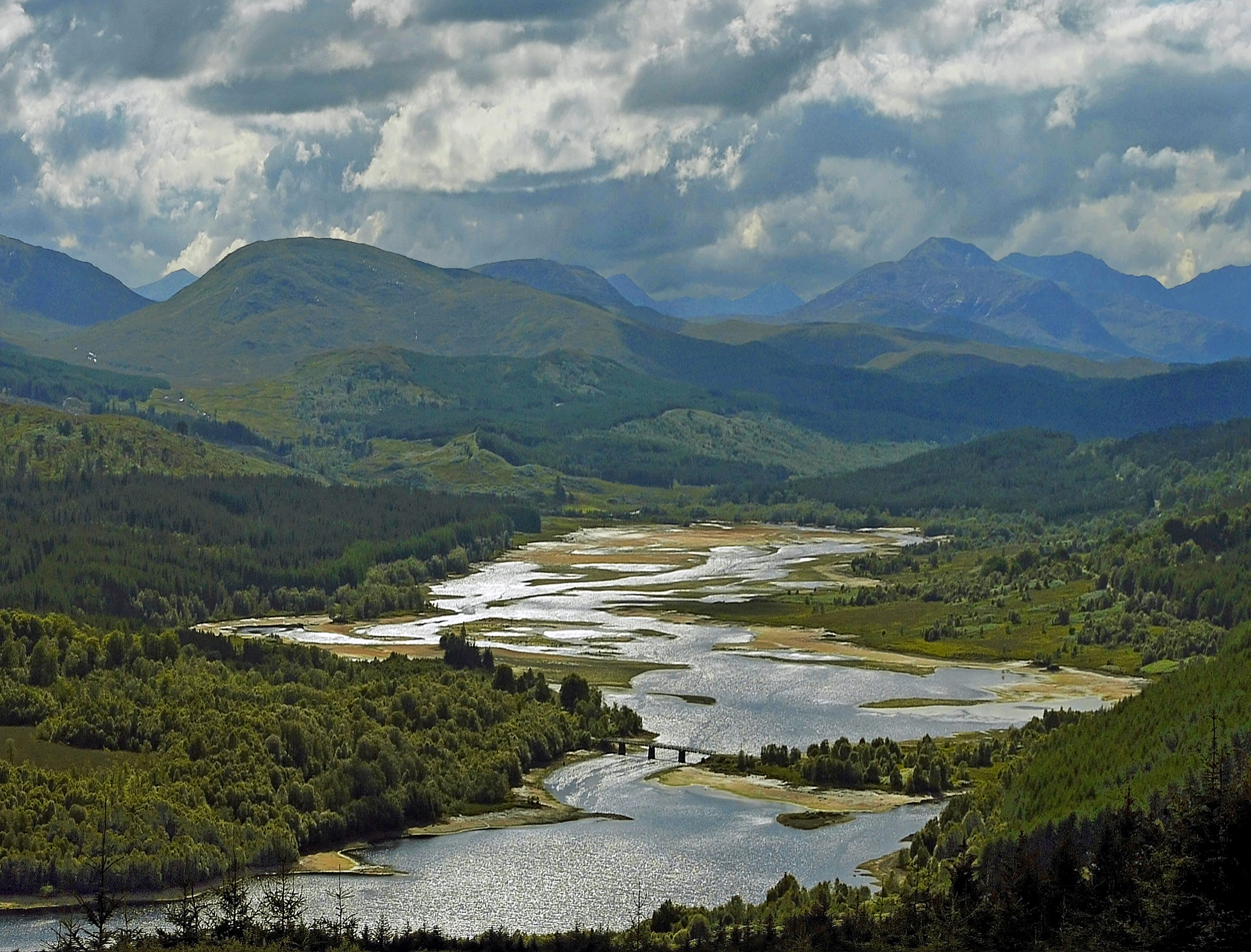
- Looking west from the lookout on the A87

- Location within Highland
- Location: Scotland
- Coordinates: 57°05′N 4°55′W
- Primary inflows: River Garry
- Basin countries: United Kingdom
- Max. length: 11.3 km (7.0 mi)
- Max. width: 0.8 km (0.50 mi)
- Surface area: 686 ha (1,700 acres)
- Average depth: 11.25 m (36.9 ft)
- Max. depth: 50 m (160 ft)
- Water volume: 846,000,000 ft^{3} (24,000,000 m^{3})
- Shore length^{1}: 30.7 km (19.1 mi)
- Surface elevation: 83 m (272 ft)
- Max. temperature: 57 °F (14 °C)
- Min. temperature: 46 °F (8 °C)
- Islands: 7
- ^{1} Shore length is not a well-defined measure.

Loch Garry (Scottish Gaelic: Loch Garraidh) is a freshwater loch 25 km north of Fort William, Lochaber, Scotland. Loch Garry is 11 km long and 50 m deep. It is fed by waters from Loch Quoich 10 km upstream on the River Garry, and drains into Loch Oich in the Great Glen just 5 km downstream. Loch Garry is much photographed from the A87 for its romantic setting and also because a quirk of perspective makes it appear like a map of Scotland.

Both lochs have been dammed for the production of hydroelectricity, the dam on Loch Quoich being the largest rockfill dam in Scotland at 320 m long and 38 m high. Water is fed by tunnel to the two power stations each producing 20MW, and the scheme was completed in 1962.

The Glen used to be home of the Clan MacDonell of Glengarry, but since the Highland Clearances the population has been reduced to a handful of estates. The main activities are deer stalking and forestry, with little tourism apart from Munro-baggers seeking some spectacularly remote mountains at the head of the glen. The minor road along the north side of Loch Garry continues past Loch Quoich to Kinlochhourn from where a footpath continues to Knoydart.

There is another Loch Garry in Glengarry County, Ontario, Canada. This loch is named by Clan MacDonell of Glengarry, after their previous home loch, Loch Garry in Scotland, after their emigration to the county from Scotland in result of the Highland Clearances

== See also ==
- List of reservoirs and dams in the United Kingdom
