= Loch Cuaich =

- Loch Quoich
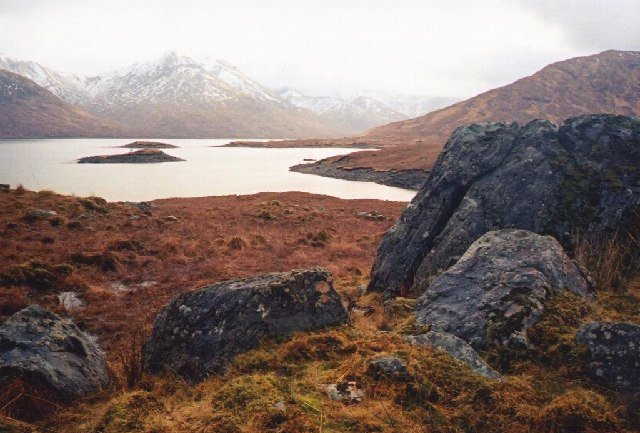
- Looking south west to Sgùrr Mòr in the distance

- Location within Highland
- Location: Lochaber, Scotland
- Coordinates: 57°04′N 5°17′W
- Type: reservoir, loch
- Basin countries: United Kingdom
- Surface elevation: 200 m (660 ft)

Loch Cuaich or Loch Quoich is a loch and reservoir situated west of Loch Garry approximately 40 km northwest of Fort William in Lochaber. The name means "loch of the quaich" in Scottish Gaelic. In 1896, it was listed as six miles long and three-quarters of a mile in width, belonging to Mrs. Ellice of Glenquoich, within the parish of Kilmonivaig.

Both Lochs Cuaich and Garry form part of the 19 MW Glen Garry hydroelectricity project commissioned by the North of Scotland Hydro-Electric Board in the 1950s. The scheme was completed in 1962.

The Fearna Storage project, a 1.8 GW / 36 GWh pumped-storage hydroelectricity project on the north-east hill expects to use 11% of Loch Cuaich.

== Geology ==
The Loch Quoich Line is a fault line extending for over 60 kilometres within the Moine Thrust Belt. In 1980, the mineral johnsomervilleite, a transition-metal phosphate mineral, was first discovered in vicinity of Loch Cuaich.

On 10 November 2018, a landslide at Loch Cuaich near Kinloch Hourn destroyed a pylon and knocked out power for 20,000 homes; telephones service was also interrupted. The landslide, which dislocated 9,000 tonnes, blocked road access until mid-2019.

== Gallery ==
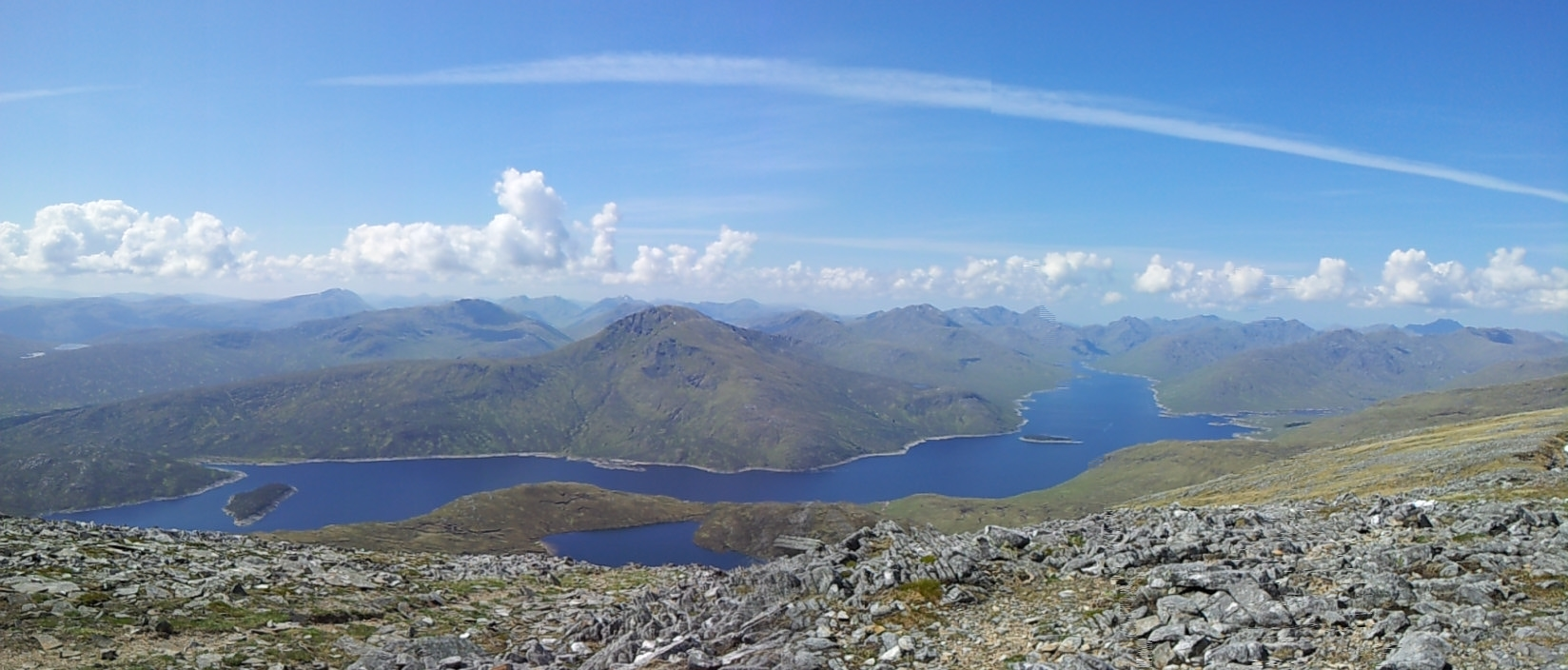
Loch Cuaich from An Spìdean Mialach

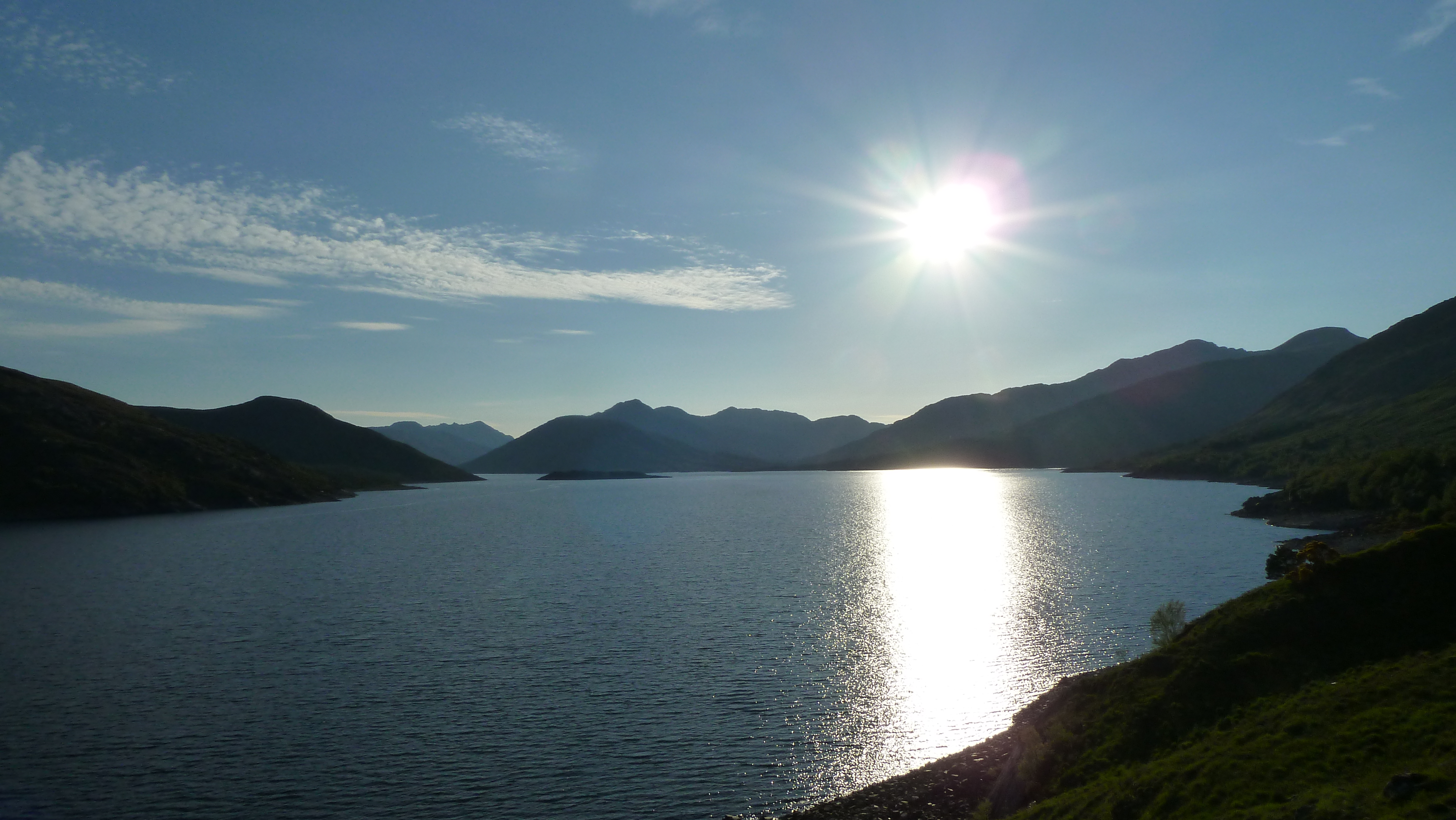
Loch Cuaich from the roadside, looking west

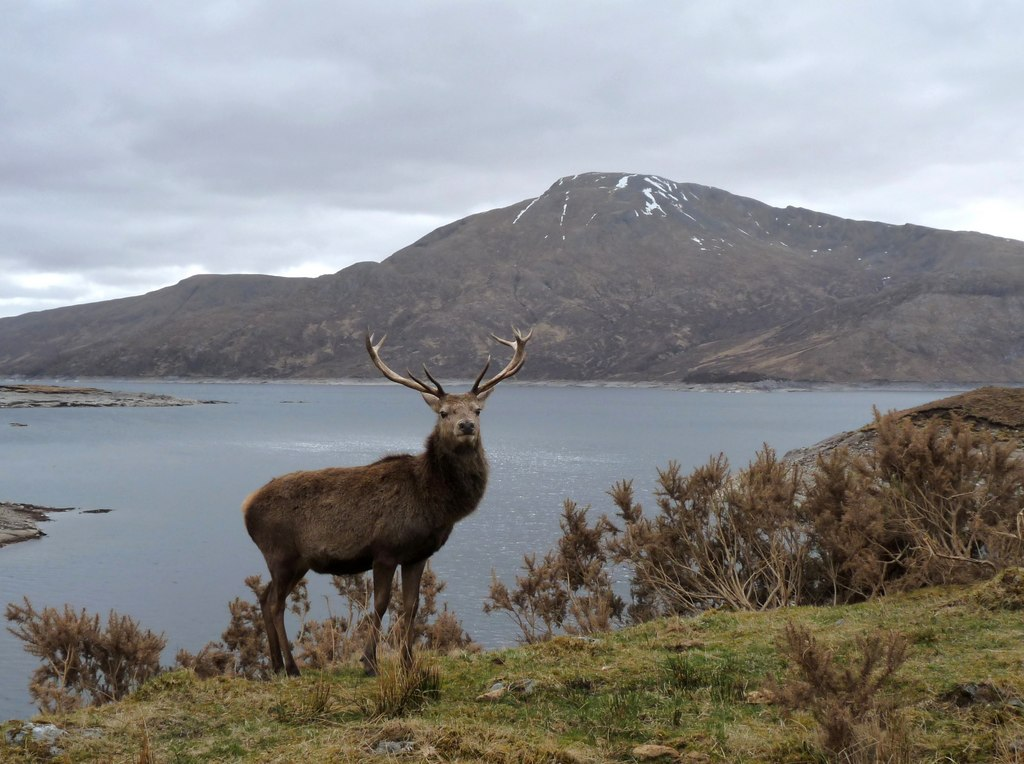
Stag at Loch Cuaich

== See also ==
- List of reservoirs and dams in the United Kingdom
