= Lochan na h-Earba =

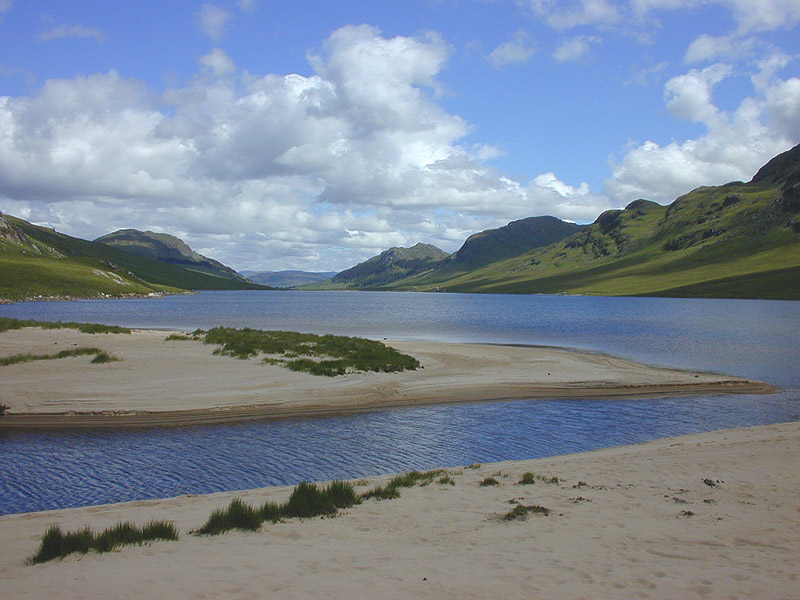
- View northeast from the southwest end of the west loch

- Location within Highland
- Location: Highland, Scotland
- Coordinates: 56°55′12″N 4°29′20″W
- Type: freshwater loch
- Primary outflows: Loch Laggan via the Allt Labhrach
- Basin countries: Scotland
- Surface elevation: 370 m (1,210 ft)

The single name Lochan na h-Earba is applied to two lochs above (and to the south of) Loch Laggan in Highland, Scotland, close to the historic boundary between Lochaber and Badenoch. It is thought that the two lochs once formed a single loch, but became separated by the build up alluvial deposits from the Moy Burn (Scottish Gaelic: Allt a' Mhaigh), which now joins the short watercourse that connects the two lochs. Ordnance Survey maps of the area show a single name printed across both lochs. They occupy a narrow glen running southwest to northeast, and roughly parallel with Loch Laggan, from which they are separated by the Binnein Shuas range of hills. The Munros of Geal Charn and Creag Pitridh are the highest peaks of the hills to the southeast.

The lochs lie on the Ardverikie Estate. They have been used as the location for several film and television productions, most frequently appearing regularly in the BBC series Monarch of the Glen, which was largely filmed in and around the Laggan area. Scenes from Mrs Brown and Outlander have also been filmed here.

Both lochs were fully surveyed by the Bathymetrical Survey of the Fresh-Water Lochs of Scotland in 1902.

== Earba Storage project ==
A 1.8 GW / 40 GWh pumped-storage hydroelectricity project received planning consent in 2025, with Earba as the lower reservoir, and Loch Leamhain as the higher reservoir at 650 m (2,130 ft) altitude.

== The west loch ==
The west loch sits an elevation of 351 metres (1,151.7 ft), and is 2.8 kilometres (1.75 mi) in length. It has a surface area of 106 hectares (263 acres), and contains 11,600,000 cubic metres (408,000,000 cu ft) of water. It has a maximum depth of 25 metres (81 ft), and a mean depth of 11 metres (35.5 ft). It is fed by numerous small burns, with the most significant being those descending from Beinn a' Chlachair.

== The east loch ==
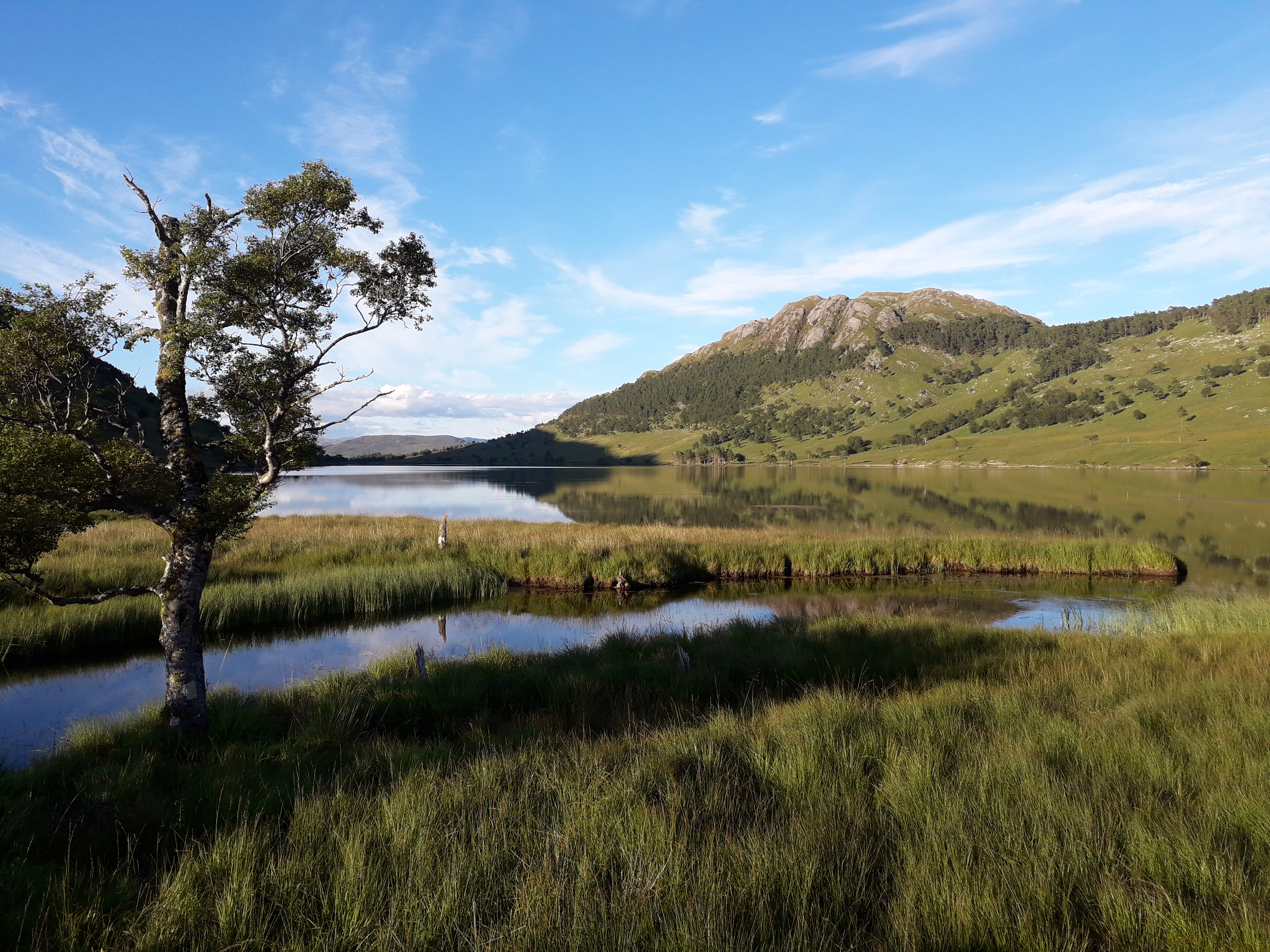
View along the east loch from its southwestern end.

The east loch is fed chiefly by the outflow from the west loch, to which it is connected by a short watercourse. It is slightly lower than the west loch, with an elevation of 348 metres (1,142.3 ft). It is the smaller of the two lochs, being 2 kilometres (1.2 mi) long, with a surface area of 59 hectares (146 acres), and contains 5,400,000 cubic metres (191,000,000 cu ft) of water. It has a maximum depth of 21 metres (69 ft), and a mean depth of 9 metres (31 ft).
