= Foyer (disambiguation) =

A foyer is a type of room, typically an entrance.

Foyer or variation, may also refer to:

== People ==
- Bob Foyers (1868–1942), UK soccer player
- Christine Foyer (born 1952), UK botanist
- Jean Foyer (1921–2008), French politician
- Lucien Le Foyer (1872–1952), French politician and pacifist
- Mats Foyer (born 1954), Swedish ambassador to North Korea
- Roz Foyer (born 1972), Scottish trade unionist

== Places ==
- Foyers, Highland, Scotland, UK; a village
- River Foyers, a river emptying into Loch Ness, near Foyers, Highland, Scotland, UK
  - Falls of Foyers, a waterfall on Foyers

== Other uses ==
- Foyer S.A., Luxembourg insurance company
- Foyer (housing model), a type of hostelry for laborers
- Le Foyer, French 3-act comedy by Octave Mirabeau

== See also ==
- Grand Foyer, White House, Washington, D.C., USA
