= Stornoway power station =

Power station in Outer Hebrides, Scotland

Coordinates: 58.2033°N 6.3737°W

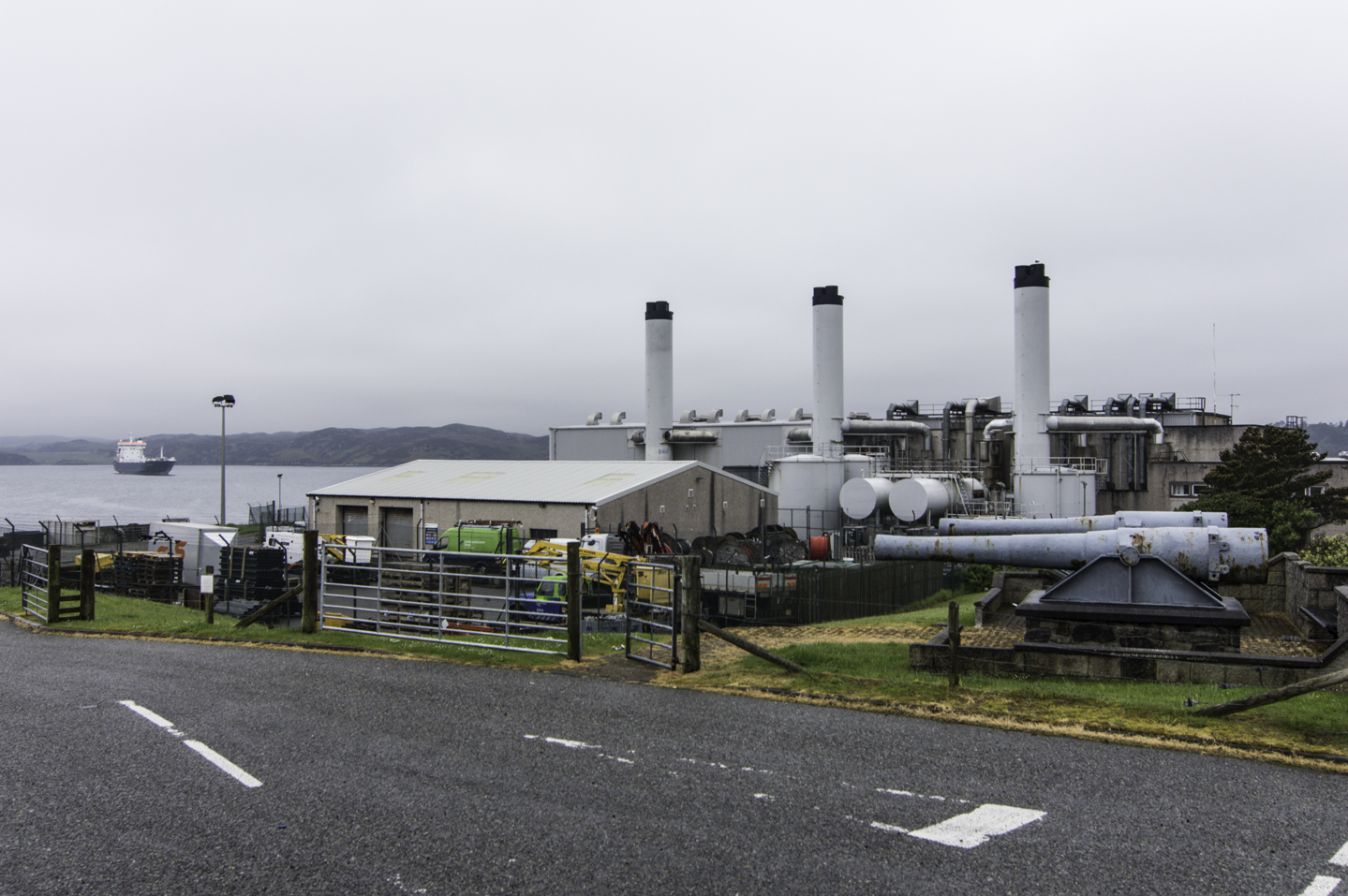
Stornoway power station

Stornoway power station, also known as Battery Point Power Station, is an electrical generation facility in Stornoway, Scotland. It was commissioned in 1954 to supply power to the Western Isles. The station has eight Mirrlees Blackstone medium speed diesel generators with a combined output of 25.5MW. The station is owned and operated by Scottish and Southern Electricity Networks (SSEN), part of SSE plc. The Western Isles power network was originally operated independently of the Scottish mainland network.

In 1990 a 33kV submarine interconnector cable was constructed to link to the 132kV single circuit from Fort Augustus via Skye to Harris onto Lewis. The power station now operates principally as a 'peaking' station during the winter months when demand exceeds the capacity of the interconnector (ca. 22MW) and during maintenance of the interconnector in the summer months as well as providing backup in case of loss of the inter-connector supply.

Other smaller power stations on the Western Isles are located at Arnish (near Stornoway), Lewis; Loch Carnan, South Uist; and Ardveenish, Barra.

== Technical details ==
The power station has a total electrical rating of 25.5MW comprising eight Mirrlees Blackstone, medium speed, compression ignition engines with a net rated thermal input of between 5.1 MW and 12.0 MW, burning low sulphur (marine grade) diesel fuel oil, as detailed below:

Engine Number	Thermal Input (MW)	Electrical Output (MW)	Engine Type
1	5.1	2.0	Mirrlees KVSS
2	5.1	2.0	Mirrlees KVSS
3	10.5	4.6	Mirrlees KV Major Mk2
5	7.4	2.2	Mirrlees KVSS
6	5.1	2.0	Mirrlees KVSS
8	9.2	3.5	Mirrlees KV Major Mk1
9	12.0	4.6	Mirrlees KV Major Mk2
10	9.5	4.6	Mirrlees KV Major Mk2
Total		25.5	

There is no engine number 4 or 7.

The engines are operated such that the newer engines (3, 9, 10) are brought on-line first and run to meet demand where possible. Should additional demand be required, power output is provided from engine 8, then from engines 5 and 6 and then from engines 1 and 2 in that order (engine 1 and 2 also being of equal rank).

The engines are grouped to exhaust through three stacks:

Stack Number	Engines
1	1, 2, 3
2	5, 6
3	8, 9, 10

Nitrogen monoxide and nitrogen dioxide (NOx) mg/Nm3 emissions are limited to 1850 mg/Nm3 per stack.

== Operating regime ==
The operating regime of the power station is heavily determined by the availability of the interconnector to the Scottish mainland and the local power demand in Stornoway. The power station's combustion engines are maintained in a back-up role to cater for periods when the island's demand for power exceeds the supply capacity.

The power station currently operates in the following scenarios:

- When the island's demand for electricity exceeds the supply capacity of the 33kV submarine cable from the mainland, typically three hours per night, five days per week between November and March when "peak lopping" occurs
- During periods of maintenance of the submarine cable, in the summer, running continuously for two weeks every June or July
- In the event of failure of the submarine cable or mainland link
- When instructed for frequency control
- Engine testing and exercising purposes on one day per month if not otherwise running

Following the completion of a number of transmission projects to improve reliability, and development of wind farms locally, site operations are now largely dictated by the availability of local wind energy supply.

In November 2018, following a landslip that damaged part of the overhead transmission network on the mainland, the Western Isles were entirely dependent on the four power stations.

== Refurbishment ==
SSE obtained consent for the refurbishment of the power station in 2017 from Scottish Environment Protection Agency (SEPA).

The historic fuel oil supply consisted of a 1 km underground fuel oil transfer pipeline from the fuelling berth at Stornoway Harbour, with a Pipeline Inspection Gauge (pig) launching / receiving facility and two 2,000 tonne bulk fuel storage tanks at the power station. The harbour facilities and associated pipeline are no longer in use. The pig launching / receiving facility has been removed.

The original fuel tanks were removed and replaced with a new tank farm that is bunded (Note: Fuel tanks with a tank-within-tank arrangement to contain any leaks in the primary tank) to the appropriate capacity specification to meet modern environmental requirements, along with provision of a new fuel oil delivery system. The new tanks are: three new 145 tonne marine-grade diesel fuel oil storage tanks, two daily service tanks, one lubricating oil tank, and one waste oil sludge tank.

The following works were approved:

- Increase in the height of the chimney stacks by 3m and an increase in the emission limit for Oxides of Nitrogen (NOx) from 1500 to 1850 mg/m3
- The cessation of use of the fuel oil supply pipeline
- The cessation of use of the former fuel oil storage tanks
- The removal of the fuel oil pipeline inspection gauge (PIG) launching/receiving facility
- The removal of two 2,000 tonne bulk storage tanks for fuel oil and replacement with three 145 tonne tanks
- The introduction of a new fuel oil storage facility and road tanker offloading area, comprising the new 145 tonne tanks, two day tanks and one lubricant oil tank
- The addition of an on-site groundwater remediation system

The chimney works were undertaken in 2017. ABB Group undertook a refurbishment of the engine turbo-chargers in 2017

== Future ==
The proposed Western Isles HVDC connection comprises a 450MW (later proposed as 600MW) HVDC link between Beauly and the Isle of Lewis and the associated Lewis Infrastructure reinforcement to be completed by 2023. This link is primarily aimed at enabling wind farm developments on the Western isles to be linked to the mainland network for export of power. However it would also provide a second circuit to the islands increasing capacity and security of supply and reducing the need for diesel plant on the islands. In 2019 the regulator Ofgem gave a provisional statement in support of a 450MW link to be confirmed later in 2019.
