= Steven's Croft power station =

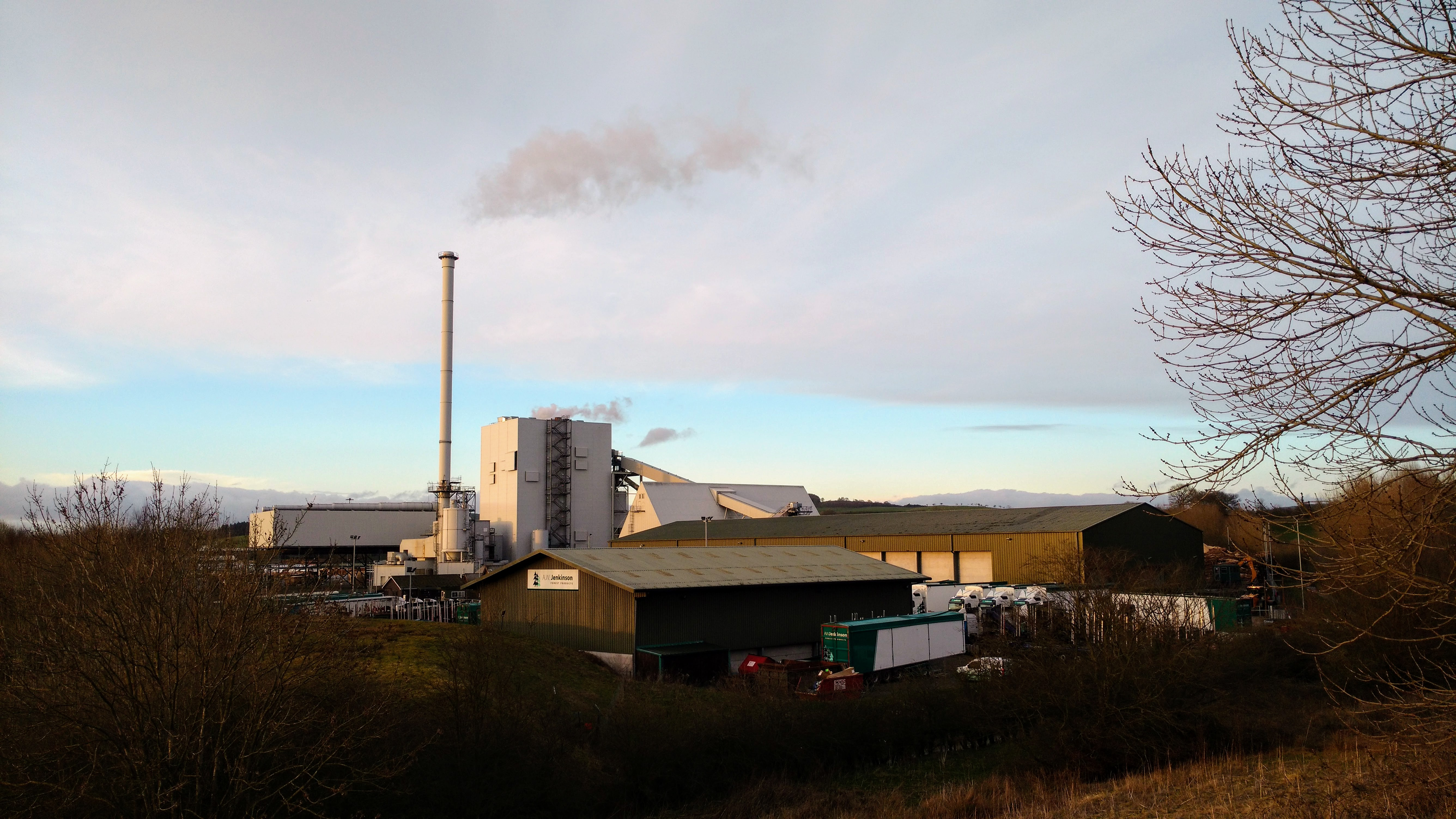
- Steven's Croft in 2017
- Country: Scotland
- Location: Dumfries and Galloway
- Coordinates: 55.152914°N 3.38279°W
- Commission date: 2008
- Operator: E.ON

Thermal power station
- Primary fuel: Wood

Steven's Croft is a wood-fired power station near Lockerbie in Scotland. It started energy production in 2008. It is operated by E.ON and produces 44 MW of electricity, burns 60% waste from timber production, 20% coppiced wood, and 20% recycled fibre. It claims to save 140,000 tonnes of greenhouse gases a year. It uses 480,000 tonnes of fuel per year to produce 126 MW of thermal energy, and the boiler is optimised to run at 537 °C and 13.7 megapascals (137 bars) of pressure. Aqueous wastes are dispersed using a wetland filtering system.
