= Gilbert Gilkes & Gordon =

English hydropower engineering company

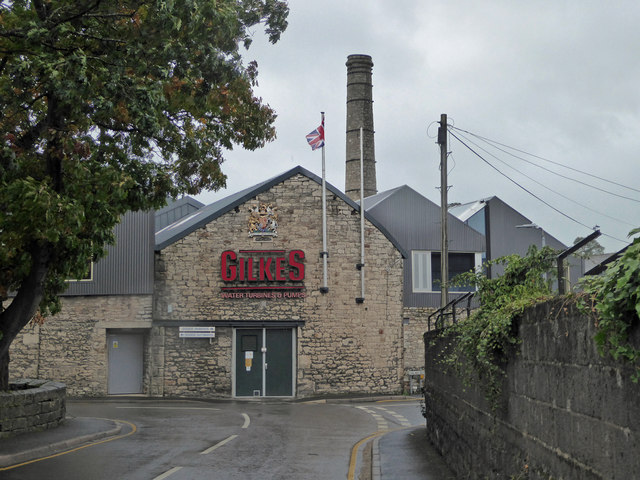
- The works in Kendal in 2018
- Industry: Hydropower engineering
- Predecessors: Williamsons Brothers; Gilbert Gilkes & Co. James Gordon & Co.
- Founded: 1853
- Founder: Gilbert Gilkes
- Headquarters: Kendal, England
- Key people: Charles Crewdson (chairman); Andy Poole (CEO)
- Products: Turgo turbine etc
- Subsidiaries: Gilkes Energy
- Website: www.gilkes.com

Gilbert Gilkes & Gordon, known as Gilkes, is an English hydropower engineering company based in Kendal, Cumbria, founded in 1853.

The company makes hydropower turbines and engine cooling pumps. One of the company's notable products is the Turgo turbine, invented in 1919 by Eric Crewdson whose grandson Charles Crewdson OBE is, as of 2021 the company chairman.

== History ==
In 1853 two brothers named Williamson established a company at Canal Head, Kendal. The first turbine they built in 1856 was installed at Holmescales Farm at Old Hutton and powered farm machinery there for more than a century. This, the "Williamson Bros Vortex Turbine No. 1", survives and is in the collection of Lakeland Arts; it was part of the Museum of Lakeland Life & Industry in Kendal, as of January 2021 closed during redevelopment of Abbot Hall.

In 1881 Gilbert Gilkes (1845–1924) bought Williamson Brothers, and remained the company chairman until 1920, when he was succeeded by his nephew, Norman Forster Wilson (born 1869). The company installed a turbine at Balmoral Castle for Queen Victoria in 1898, to provide electric lighting.

In 1932 the company acquired James Gordon & Co, and became Gilbert Gilkes & Gordon.

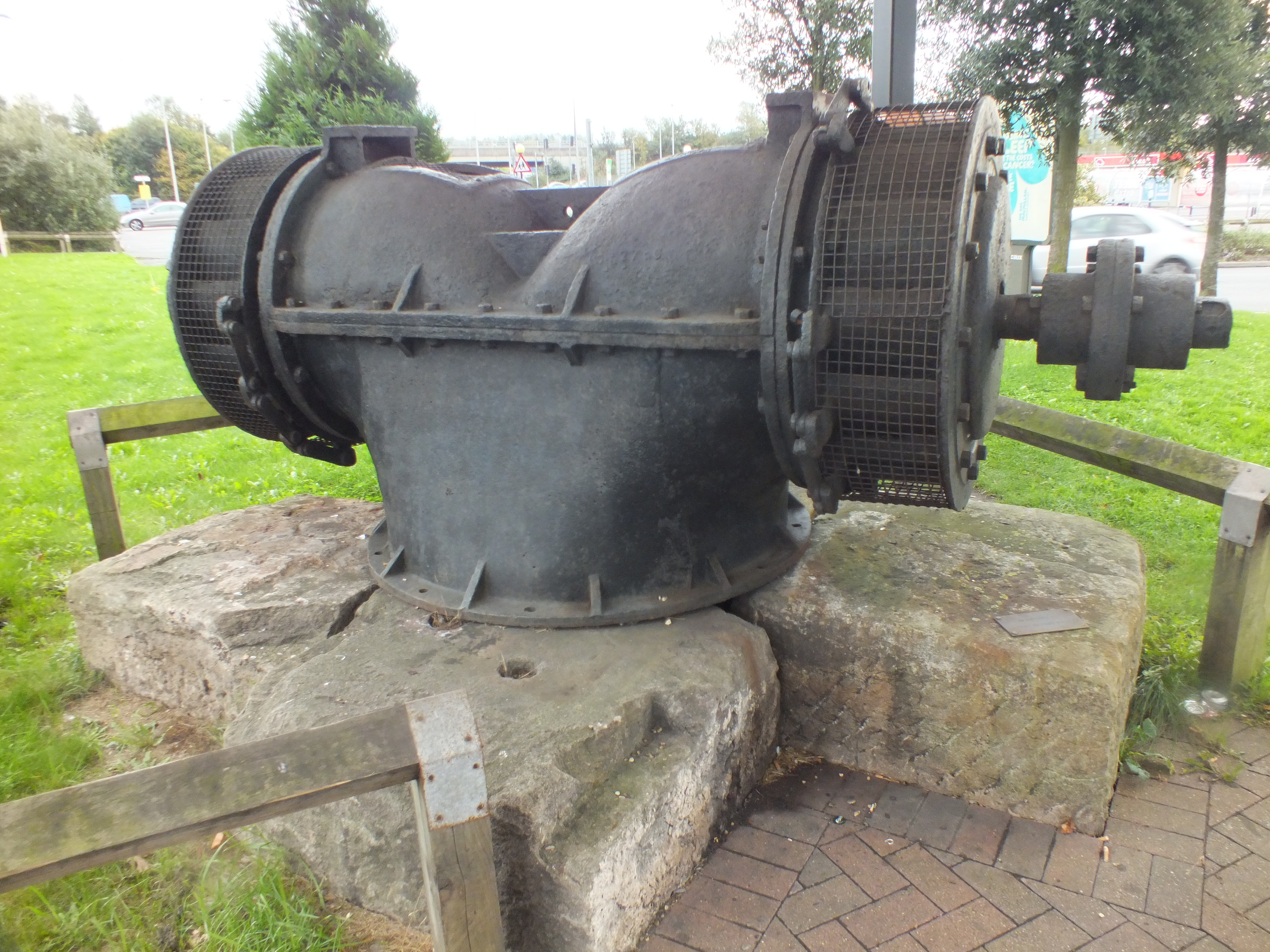
A preserved Gilkes turbine from the former Portwood mill near Stockport, now a supermarket site

Gilkes Energy was formed as a subsidiary in 2010 and works in hydropower project development.

== Recognition ==
The company has held a Royal warrant as "Water Turbine Engineers" since 1996, initially to Elizabeth II and now to King Charles III. In 2010 the company was awarded The Queen's Award for Enterprise: International Trade (Export).
