= Awe Hydro-Electric Scheme =

Power stations near Loch Awe, Scotland

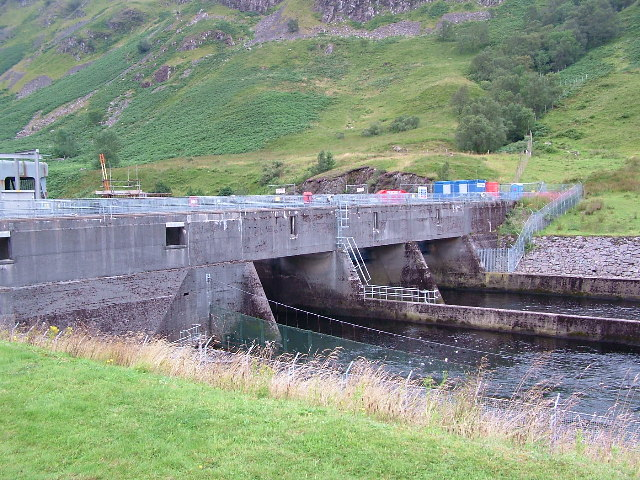
- The Awe barrage controls flow to Inverawe power station

- Location within Argyll and Bute
- Country: Scotland
- Location: Loch Awe, Argyll and Bute
- Coordinates: 56.3937°N 5.1138°W
- Purpose: Power
- Status: Operational
- Opening date: 1965
- Owners: SSE, Drax Group

The Awe Hydro-Electric Scheme was the penultimate scheme developed by the North of Scotland Hydro-Electric Board. It centres around Loch Awe, in Argyll and Bute, on the southern edge of the Scottish Highlands. It consists of three power stations, two conventional hydro-electric stations, and the Cruachan power station, the first large pumped storage scheme built by the Board. It was completed in 1965.

== History ==
The North of Scotland Hydro-Electric Board was created by the Hydro-electric Development (Scotland) Act 1943, a measure championed by the politician Tom Johnston while he was Secretary of State for Scotland. Johnston's vision was for a public body that could build hydro-electric stations throughout the Highlands. Profits made by selling bulk electricity to the Scottish lowlands would be used to fund "the economic development and social improvement of the North of Scotland." Private consumers would be offered a supply of cheap electricity, and their connection to that supply would not reflect the actual cost of its provision in remote and sparsely populated areas.

Sir Edward MacColl, the first chief executive for the North of Scotland Hydro-Electric Board had suggested the use of a "reversible hydraulic station" at Sloy in 1936, while working for the Central Electricity Board, but his idea was dismissed as uneconomic at the time. The Loch Sloy Hydro-Electric Scheme was the first constructional scheme that the Board built, but the power station was a conventional one, as pumped storage was too much of a gamble for their first project. The Shira Hydro-Electric Scheme, completed in 1957, and situated immediately to the west of the Sloy scheme, included Sron Mor power station, which was the first major implementation of pumped storage in Britain. Although it was a fairly small-scale station, the Board were keen that operational data for it should be collected, in view of its potential benefits for systems which might soon include nuclear generating capacity.

By the late 1950s, it seemed that the time was right to suggest a major pumped storage scheme. Angus Fulton, who had taken over as chief executive in 1955, and was as fanatical an advocate of hydro-electric power as MacColl had been, was keen to drive this forwards, but knew that they would need to resolve a number of civil, electrical and mechanical engineering issues before such a scheme could be confidently proposed. The Awe scheme became the Board's Constructional Scheme No.28, and was published on 17 July 1957. The scheme would include two conventional stations, Nant, which would use the waters of Loch Nant and would discharge into Loch Awe, and Inverawe, which would use water from Loch Awe and discharge back into the River Awe just before it entered the sea loch Loch Etive. To achieve this, a barrage would be built across the River Awe, from where a tunnel would feed water to the power station.

The barrage would be located in the Pass of Brander, and the Amenity committee asked whether is could be moved further upstream, to retain the beauty of the pass. However, the Board could not accommodate this, as the structure had to be capable of discharging large volumes of water into the river in times of flood, and this would be compromised if it was further upstream, where is would be much narrower. Nor could its height be increased, as the water levels of Loch Awe had to be maintained within close limits. Moving the barrage would also involve extending the tunnel for the power station, and the cost of this was estimated to be £475,000.

The third power station would be the Cruachan pumped storage station. Whereas previous implementations of pumped storage had always used separate pumps, Fulton suggested that a reversible pump-turbine would be considerably cheaper and would occupy much less space. As there was no existing data for starting such a machine in pumping mode, when it was working against a high head, he invited hydro-electric manufacturers to develop the machinery needed. Boving & Co carried out research at Kristinehamn in Sweden, while English Electric used their hydraulic laboratories in Rugby. Merz & McLellan the consulting engineers were satisfied that the designs would work, and the scheme was approved by Parliament in May 1959. Work began on the River Awe barrage and the stations at Nant and Inverawe soon afterwards.

=== Construction ===
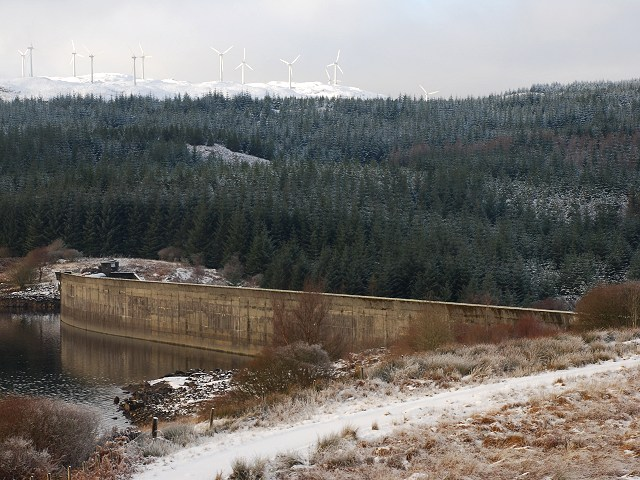
Nant dam prevents water from spilling into Glen Nant

Nant was the smallest of the stations, with an installed capacity of 15 MW. It has a head of 564 feet (172 m), taking its water supply from Loch Nant and discharging into Loch Awe. The station is located underground, accessed by a tunnel that starts near to the start of the overhead transmission lines. In common with many of the schemes that the Board built, the natural catchment of Loch Nant was supplemented by capturing the headwaters of the Abhainn Fionain and its tributaries. Aqueducts feed this additional flow into the tunnel to the power station, rather than into the loch. The capacity of Loch Nant was increased by the construction of a mass gravity dam which prevents the extra water from flowing northwards along the River Nant to Loch Etive. The intake tower for the tunnel is located to the south of the loch, and the gatehouse contains two roller gates to regulate the flow.

Inverawe station has an installed capacity of 25 MW, and a head of 118 feet (36 m). When built, a travelling crane was constructed first, and then the rest of the building was erected around it. The single turbine uses large volumes of water, and was designed to do so, to take account of the size of the catchment of Loch Awe and the fluctuations in water level that occur. The power station is above ground and has a pitched roof. A surge shaft to protect the pipeline is located to the north-east of the power station, on higher ground. The Awe barrage regulates flow on the river, and diverts water into the tunnel supplying the power station. Two radial gates allow it to be used to control flood flows on the river, and it has been designed so that in extreme conditions, flood water can flow over the top of the structure without causing a breach. Under normal conditions, compensation flow to maintain the habitat in the River Awe below the barrage passes through a compensation set, which generates additional power. To enable migrating fish to access Loch Awe, the structure includes a Borland fish pass. Both stations were commissioned in 1963.

The major task for the Cruachan station was the excavation of some 300,000 cubic yards (230,000 m^{3}) of rock to create the caverns in which the machinery would be located. The rock was expected to be fine-grained granite, but once work started, a crush zone was discovered, which passed through the site diagonally. This required changes to the way the rest of the chamber was excavated, and additional support to the roof. Two of the four 100-MW turbines were ordered from Boving, and two from English Electric, although both used subcontractors, and they were supplied by John Brown of Clydebank and Harland and Wolff. Construction of the tailrace into Loch Awe was particularly difficult, due to the steep slope of the banks of the loch, and the fact that the rock was covered with gravel and boulders. The outfall works were quite extensive, due in part to the need for them to include fine mesh filters, to prevent salmon smolts from entering the tunnel.

The upper reservoir for the station was formed by constructing a massive buttress dam across the exit of a corrie high above Loch Awe. This type of dam was chosen because it was known that it could withstand the changes in pressure that arise when water levels fluctuate significantly. The design has eleven buttresses, five to the west and six to the east of a central gravity block, which houses two intakes, the gate shafts and the outlet pipes. The dam is 1,037 feet (316 m) long, and provides a head of 1,198 feet (365 m) for the turbines. The catchment for the reservoir is 8.9 square miles (23 km^{2}), achieved by constructing a network of around 12 miles (19 km) of tunnels to capture the headwaters of numerous streams. A tunnel to the south-east of the dam intercepts the Allt Lorgaidh, while one to the south-west picks up water from several streams that flow into the River Awe. To the north, a series of interconnecting tunnels pick up water from the River Noe and its tributaries, the Allt Mhoille and its tributaries, and the River Liver and its tributaries. Unusually, the routes of the tunnels are shown on Ordnance Survey maps, although they are not visible from the surface.

Despite many bridges on the route to the site being strengthened, some items were still too heavy to cross them, and were delivered in pieces, to be reassembled on site. This included the two main transformers, which were supplied by Ferranti's, and this was the first time that such an approach had been used for transformers. They had to be reassembled in environmentally controlled tents erected in the main chamber. During the final year there were 21 principal contractors and many sub-contractors working on site for 24 hours a day. The station was completed more or less on time, and the cost of it was only 8 per cent above the estimates made seven years earlier. The opening of the station was held on 15 October 1965, attended by Queen Elizabeth, who had agreed to the date some two years earlier. The machines were not quite ready, and when the Queen operated the switch to start the first set, it actually started an electric motor to turn the generator, and some sound effects to make it appear that it was operating. Few people knew of the reality, and it was another two months before the machines were actually ready. There were teething problems which damaged two of the machines, and the first two sets were not fully operational until January 1966, with all four being available from 1967.

=== Operation ===
One benefit of the network of tunnels feeding water into Cruachan Reservoir is that around 10 per cent of the electricity generated by the station is conventional hydro-electric power. When the electricity industry was privatised in 1990, most of the assets of the North of Scotland Hydro-Electric Board became the responsibility of Scottish Hydro-Electric, which subsequently became SSE plc, but Cruachan passed to Scottish Power, which took over the assets of the South of Scotland Electricity Board. Two of the turbines at Cruachan have since been upgraded from 100 MW to 120 MW, increasing the output of the station to 440 MW. When operating in pumping mode, the motors consume 110 MW.

Since the Awe barrage was built, flow in the River Awe below it has been controlled by the release of compensation water. Until 2010, the compensation flow was high in the summer, to support fishing interests, and low in winter, but this is the opposite of how a natural river works. There were concerns that this was detrimental to juvenile salmon or smolts, and the Argyll Fisheries Trust conducted research to understand what was happening. Without juvenile salmon reaching the sea, the numbers of adult salmon returning to spawn are reduced, and this trend has become apparent on many rivers. After negotiation, a new regime was introduced in 2012, where the summer flows were reduced, and the winter flows increased. The quantity of salmon, grilse and sea trout in the river is significantly lower than it was in the 1960s, when the main concern was fishing, rather than sustaining stocks for the future.

Compensation flows on the river are normally maintained at around 900 Megalitres per day (Mld). In addition, there is a schedule of freshet releases, where extra water is discharged for a limited period. In 2023, three freshets of 300 Ml are scheduled during April and May, with the extra flow lasting for 12 hours. Freshets of 500 Ml over 24 hours are released on two occasions in July and August, with one of 600 Ml in 24 hours in September. A further six freshets of 2,100 Ml over 72 hours are scheduled at two-week intervals between October and December. In addition, there is a freshet gate in the barrage, and when there is a build up of smolts above the barrage, a smolt freshet is released through the gate, to assist passage of the smolts to the sea. These occur between mid-April and the end of June. Finally, the Borland fish lift operates throughout the year, filling four times a day between March and September, and twice a day during the winter months. Each lift cycle takes an hour to complete, and enables adult salmon to reach Loch Awe.

== Glen Noe Hydro-Electric Scheme ==
Despite the fact that some of the headwaters of the River Noe are captured to feed Cruachan Reservoir, RWE decided that there was still sufficient flow in the river to power a run-of-the-river hydro-electric station. Argyll and Bute Council authorised construction of the Glen Noe hydropower project in September 2016, and construction began in 2019. The power station is located close to Loch Etive, and is fed by 1.9 miles (3.1 km) of buried pipeline, which runs along the south bank of the river. At its far end, there are two dams, one across the River Noe, and another across a tributary, which divert water into the pipeline. A third dam diverts water from another tributary into the pipeline roughly half way along its length. The power station has a wooden finish, and contains a 2 MW turbine. It was commissioned in February 2021, and the scheme will benefit the local community, as RWE will pay £3,000 per year into a community fund run by Taynuilt Community Council while the station is operational.

== Bibliography ==
- "Power From the Glens" (PDF). Scottish and Southern Energy. Archived from the original (PDF) on 18 October 2007.
- BERR, ed. (2009). "Power stations in the United Kingdom, May 2009 (DUKES 5.11)". BERR. Archived from the original (XLS) on 2 October 2009.
- Fleetwood, David; et al. (2010). MacDowell, Dawn (ed.). Power to the People - the built heritage of Scotland's hydroelectric power. Historic Scotland. ISBN 978-1-84917-036-9.
- Miller, James (2002). The dam builders: power from the glens. Birlinn. ISBN 978-1-84158-225-2.
- Payne, Peter L (1988). The hydro: a study of the development of the major hydro-electric schemes undertaken by the North of Scotland Hydro-Electric Board. Pergamon. ISBN 978-0-08-036584-8.
- Reeves, Julian, ed. (2018). Power from the Glens - 75th Anniversary edition. SSE. ISBN 978-1-5272-2500-8.
- Wood, Emma (2002). The Hydro Boys: Pioneers of Renewable Energy. Luath Press. ISBN 978-1-84282-016-2.
