= Kerry Falls Hydro-Electric Scheme =

Power station near Peninver, Scotland

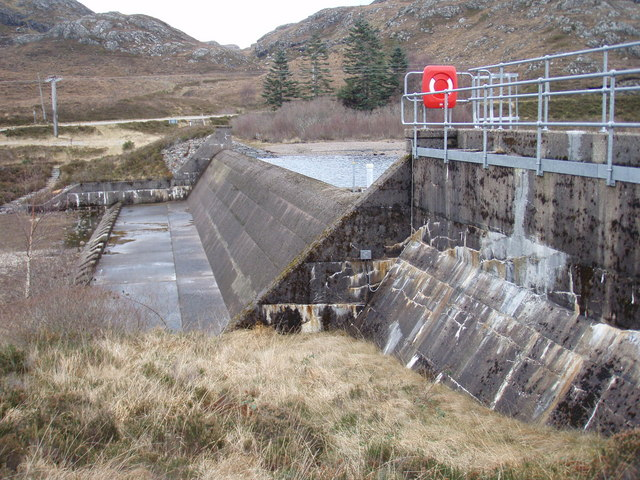
- Loch Bad an Sgalaig Dam impounds the water supply for the power station

- Location within Highland
- Country: Scotland
- Location: Gairloch, Wester Ross
- Coordinates: 57.6852°N 5.6435°W
- Purpose: Power
- Status: Operational
- Opening date: 1952
- Owner: SSE

Kerry Falls Hydro-Electric Scheme, sometimes known as Gairloch is a small-scale hydro-electric power station, built by the North of Scotland Hydro-Electric Board and commissioned in 1952. It is located near Gairloch in Wester Ross, part of the Highlands of Scotland. It was originally designed to supply power to local communities in this remote area, but is now connected to the National Grid.

The River Kerry below the power station is a Special Area of Conservation, due to the presence of an internationally important population of freshwater pearl mussels. It also hosts populations of salmon and trout, without which the mussels could not reproduce. The hydro-electric scheme is thought to contribute to the success of the mussels, as Loch Bad an Sgalaig traps silt, which if deposited on gravel beds can suffocate mussels and fish embryos. The flow on the river is also relatively stable for long periods, although subject to step changes when turbines are switched on or off, and flows are maintained throughout the year, enabling salmon and trout to enter the river.

== History ==
The North of Scotland Hydro-Electric Board was created by the Hydro-electric Development (Scotland) Act 1943, a measure championed by the politician Tom Johnston while he was Secretary of State for Scotland. Johnston's vision was for a public body that could build hydro-electric stations throughout the Highlands. Profits made by selling bulk electricity to the Scottish lowlands would be used to fund "the economic development and social improvement of the North of Scotland." Private consumers would be offered a supply of cheap electricity, and their connection to that supply would not reflect the actual cost of its provision in remote and sparsely populated areas.

The chairman of the new Board was to be Lord Airlie, who had initially been critical of the 1943 Act because its scope was too limited. The deputy chairman and chief executive was Edward MacColl, an engineer with wide experience of hydro-electric projects and electrical distribution networks. It soon became clear that MacColl intended to push ahead with the aspirations of the Act at breakneck speeds. He produced a list of 102 potential sites in just three months, and in June 1944, the first constructional scheme was published. This was for the Loch Sloy scheme, which had a ready market for bulk supplies to nearby Clydeside, but it included two smaller schemes, to demonstrate the Board's commitment to supplying remote areas.

Kerry Falls was part of Constructional Scheme No.2, and was included as part of the much larger Tummel Hydro-Electric Scheme. When the scheme was published, there were no objections to the Kerry Falls scheme, which was a small scale project capable of generating around 1.25 MW of electricity, but concerted objections to the Tummel scheme, which would include several power stations with a capacity to generate 150 MW. Many within the North of Scotland Hydro-Electric Board thought that it might be better to postpone the scheme, in view of the bitter animosity that they had suffered with the Sloy scheme, but MacColl wanted to push on, in the hope that if this succeeded, there might be less opposition to future schemes. Kerry Falls was caught up in the ensuing furore.

Johnston decided to appoint a tribunal to hear the evidence for and against the scheme, which started on 25 May 1945 and lasted for ten days. The transcript of the hearing ran to 1,188 pages. At the end of it, Mr Hill-Watson, summing up for the opposition, stated that the whole scheme was uneconomic, would destroy the salmon fisheries of the River Tay, wipe out the tourist trade and spoil the amenities of Pitlochry. He stated that the Highlands would barely benefit, as only 350 houses in Gairloch would benefit from an electricity supply, whereas all of the power from the Tummel scheme would be sold to the Lowlands. Although they acknowledged the seriousness of the objections, the tribunal decided that the whole scheme was in the public interest, and should proceed. The bill then had to go before Parliament, where there were further attempts to derail it, and savage attacks on Lord Airlie. However, an annulment order in the House of Commons was rejected, and a similar attempt in the House of Lords was eventually withdrawn, allowing the scheme to be approved on 19 November 1945. The Kerry Falls project could then proceed.

An impounding reservoir was created by building a dam across the outlet of Loch Bad an Sgalaig, at the upper end of the River Kerry. A further small dam and pond were created below the dam, to feed water into a surface pipeline, which runs along the north bank of the river to the site of the turbine house. This creates a head of 183 feet (56 m) for the turbines. There are three turbines, with a combined capacity of 1.25 MW. Originally there were two, but a third, smaller turbine was added to allow water to bypass the main turbines and effectively provide compensation water to the river while still generating electricity. The red sandstone used in the construction of the building was quarried near Dingwall, and the project was completed by the contractor Willie Logan, later known for the creation of the airline Loganair.

=== Operation ===
In 2002, the Renewables Obligation (Scotland) legislation was introduced. It was conceived as a way to promote the development of small-scale hydro-electric, wave power, tidal power, photovoltaics, wind power and biomas schemes, but by the time it came into force, the definition of small scale had been increased from 5 MW to 10 MW and then 20 MW, and existing hydro-electric stations that had been refurbished to improve efficiency could be included. Kerry Falls at 1.3 MW thus qualified, and between 2004 and 2007 the station qualified for 14,867 Renewable Obligation Certificates, generating a subsidy for SSE of nearly £710,000. SSE expected to refurbish the turbines at the station during 2008.

== Hydrology ==
The reservoir for the scheme was formed by building a dam across the outlet from Loch Bad an Sgalaig into the River Kerry. This is supplemented by water from Loch Dubh and Am Feur-Loch. Loch Bad an Sgalaig and Loch Dubh are effectively a single loch, with the surface levels of both at 381 feet (116 m) above Ordnance datum (AOD). They cover an area of 0.51 square miles (1.32 km^{2}) and drain a catchment area of 13.01 square miles (33.7 km^{2}). Am Feur-Loch is located to the north-east of the reservoir and is much smaller, covering just 7.4 acres (3 ha) and draining 3.07 square miles (7.95 km^{2}). Its elevation is 384 feet (117 m).

This receives water from Lochan a' Chleirich, of a similar size but at an elevation of 584 feet (178 m), which is to the south east. The Allt Lochan a' Chleirich connects the two water bodies. From the north, the Allt Airigh an Leisteir brings water from Loch nam Buainichean to Am Feur-Loch. This has a surface area of 30 acres (12 ha), drains an area of 0.57 square miles (1.48 km^{2}) and is at an elevation of 659 feet (201 m).

Loch Bad an Sgalaig also receives some water from Loch na h-Oidhche, some distance to the south-east. This is a comparatively deep loch, with a maximum depth of 121 feet (36.9 m). It has a surface area of 0.54 square miles (1.4 km^{2}), drains an area of 3 square miles (7.77 km^{2}), and is located at 1,273 feet (388 m) AOD. Its ouflow descends quite rapidly, but when it reaches Meall Lochan na Geala, a hill that rises to 1,253 feet (382 m), it divides into two. The Abhainn a' Gharbh Coire flows to the left of the hill to reach Loch Bad an Sgalaig, while the Abhainn Loch na h-Oidhche flows to the right of the hill, and passes through Loch Garbhaig to reach Loch Maree.

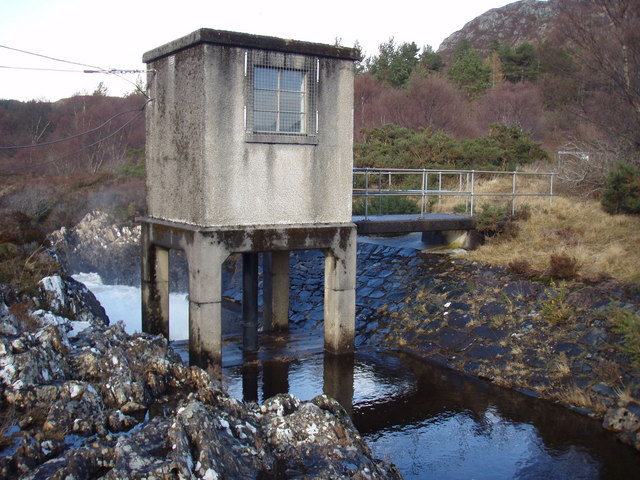
The valve tower controls flow from Loch Bad an Sgalaig

Below the Bad an Sgalaig Dam, a valve tower controls flows from the reservoir into the River Kerry. A small dam further downstream forms a smaller storage area, and a similar structure controls flow into the pipeline, which runs on the north bank of the river as it flows to the west. The pipeline is crossed by the A832 road about halfway along its length, and again close to the turbine house, which is located on the right bank of the river, and discharges into the river. Just below it is a weir, which prevents migrating salmon and trout from passing further upstream. Below the weir, the river is a Special Area of Conservation (SAC).

Land to the south of the river is drained by Lochan Druim na Fearna, feeding the Allt Loch Druim na Fearna and Loch na Doire Mòire, feeding the Allt Loch na Doire Mòire. These two streams join the Allt na Claise, before the combined flow enters the River Kerry, which turns to the north at this point. The A832 road has followed the river closely on its right bank for all of its length, and the only major bridge over the river occurs where the B8056 road from Badachro crosses to join the A832. The river passes to the west of the hamlet of Kerrysdale, where it turns to the north-west, and then turns to the south-west to enter Loch Kerry, an inlet which is part of the sealoch Loch Gairloch or Gair Loch. A salmon hatchery is located on the north bank close to the mouth of the River Kerry.

== Ecology ==
The River Kerry is about 3.1 miles (5 km) long and the lower 2.1 miles (3.4 km) from its mouth to the weir below the hydro-electric station is a Special Area of Conservation, as defined by the European Union's Habitats Directive. It has been designated because it provides habitat for an internationally important population of freshwater pearl mussels. It also hosts populations of salmon and trout, without which the mussels could not reproduce. The river is one of the best stretches of water for the endangered mussels in the United Kingdom, and probably Europe. Following a flood event in 1998, a careful survey of the population was made, and it was estimated that there were from 600,000 to 1.2 million mussels in the river and some of its tributaries. The population includes a fairly high proportion of juveniles, indicating that it is in good condition.

Mussels can live for up to 150 years, and live in patches of coarse sand and gravel in fast-flowing, acidic rivers. Fertilised eggs spend the first half year of their life cycle attached to the gill fibres of salmon or trout, living as parasites. They then drop off, and bury themselves in sand or gravel for five years, until they reach the adult stage. An adult mussel filters up to 11 imperial gallons (50 L) of water a day, removing dissolved material to the benefit of the salmon, trout and other species. Some research has concluded that hydro-electric plants usually result in mussel populations declining, but this does not appear to be the case in the Kerry. The Bad an Sgalaig Dam prevents sediment from the upper reaches of the river system entering the Kerry, which is beneficial because silt entering the gravel beds can suffocate mussels and fish embryos. Volumes of water in the river remain relatively stable for long periods, although subject to step changes when the number of turbines in use is changed, and flood events are attenuated by Loch an Sgalaig. All of these factors are thought to contribute to the success of the population of mussels.

== Bibliography ==
- Dekker, Nick (2008). "Public Petition No. PE1184" (PDF). Scottish Parliament. Archived (PDF) from the original on 10 January 2024.
- Miller, James (2002). The Dam Builders - Power from the Glens. Birlinn. ISBN 978-1-84158-225-2.
- Payne, Peter L (1988). The Hydro. Aberdeen University Press. ISBN 978-0-08-036584-8.
- Swap (June 2005). "Subsidies and Subterfuge" (PDF). Scottish Wind Assessment Project. Archived (PDF) from the original on 11 October 2022.
- Thomas, R; Hoey, J (2006). Geomorphological assessment of the River Kerry Special Area of Conservation. Commissioned Report No.182 (Report). Scottish Natural Heritage.
- Wood, Emma (2002). The Hydro Boys. Luath Press. ISBN 978-1-84282-016-2.
