= Kilmelfort Hydro-Electric Scheme =

Power station near Kilmelford, Scotland

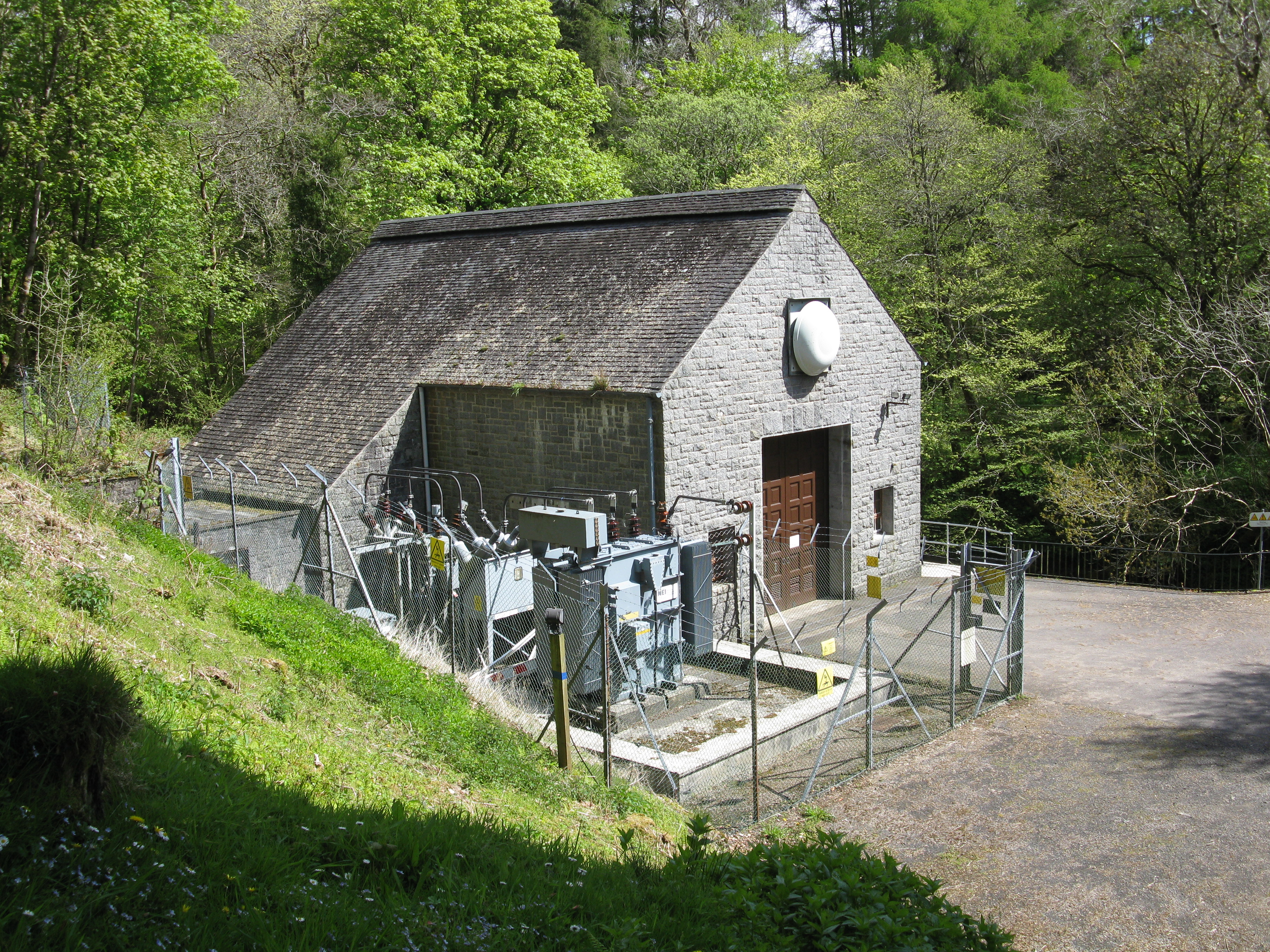
- The turbine house for the Kilmelfort scheme

- Location within Argyll and Bute
- Country: Scotland
- Location: Kilmelford, Argyll and Bute
- Coordinates: 56.2732°N 5.4895°W
- Purpose: Power
- Status: Operational
- Opening date: 1956
- Owner: SSE plc

Kilmelfort Hydro-Electric Scheme is a small-scale hydro-electric power station, built by the North of Scotland Hydro-Electric Board and commissioned in 1956. It is located near Kilmelford in Argyll and Bute, Scotland. It was originally designed to supply power to the local communities around Kilmelford, but is now connected to the National Grid.

== History ==
The North of Scotland Hydro-Electric Board was created by the Hydro-electric Development (Scotland) Act 1943, a measure championed by the politician Tom Johnston while he was Secretary of State for Scotland. Johnston's vision was for a public body that could build hydro-electric stations throughout the Highlands. Profits made by selling bulk electricity to the Scottish lowlands would be used to fund "the economic development and social improvement of the North of Scotland." Private consumers would be offered a supply of cheap electricity, and their connection to that supply would not reflect the actual cost of its provision in remote and sparsely populated areas.

The chairman of the new Board was to be Lord Airlie, who had initially been critical of the 1943 Act because its scope was too limited. The deputy chairman and chief executive was Edward MacColl, an engineer with wide experience of hydro-electric projects and electrical distribution networks. It soon became clear that MacColl intended to push ahead with the aspirations of the Act at breakneck speeds. He produced a list of 102 potential sites in just three months, and in June 1944, the first constructional scheme was published. This was for the Loch Sloy scheme, which had a ready market for bulk supplies to nearby Clydeside, but it included two smaller schemes, to demonstrate the Board's commitment to supplying remote areas.

Kilmelfort was another small scheme, designed to supply the remote communities near Kilmelford, about 15 miles (24 km) south of Oban. The scheme was designed by the architect Ian Gordon Lindsay, and the turbine house is located on the right bank of the River Oude, to the north of the hamlet of Melfort. It contains a single 2 MW undershot turbine, supplied by Gilbert Gilkes & Gordon of Kendal, which is supplemented by a 75 kW machine powered by compensation water released to maintain the habitat in the River Oude. Lindsay was also responsible for the design of an attendant's cottage and the bridge over the River Oude which provides access to the cottage and turbine house.

Water for the scheme is stored in Oude Dam, a reservoir created by constructing a dam across the River Oude. It is a mass gravity dam and is relatively small, as it is located in a steep-sided gorge. It incorporates a fixed spillway, and a walkway for pedestrians runs along the top of it. An intake tower controls the flow of water into a tunnel, with a steel pressure pipeline completing the route to the turbine house. Further upstream is Loch Tralaig, which has been enlarged by the construction of another mass gravity dam, consisting of a central spillway with earth embankments on either side of it. A control tower regulates the water discharged through the dam, which passes through the compensation set to generate additional power before flowing along the stream bed to reach Oude Dam.

The water supply has been increased by the construction of a small dam at the northern end of Loch Cheallair. A stream flows northwards from the dam to join the River Oude just below the Loch Tralaig Dam. Loch Na Sreinge is located to the east of Loch Tralaig, and its natural outlet flows northwards along the Allt Braglenmore to Loch Scammadale, but another dam has been built across the outlet, and some of its water flows through a tunnel which discharges into the streams that feed Loch Tralaig.

The scheme was commissioned in 1956, and was the North of Scotland Hydro-Electric Board's Constructional Scheme No.61. In early 1957, Lord Lucas of Chilworth asked questions in the House of Lords about the costs of Scottish hydro-electricity. Lord Strathclyde stated that for Kilmelfort, the capital cost of the project was £334 per kW, towards the upper end of the 27 schemes mentioned, and considerably higher than the average cost of £175 per kW, reflecting the remote location in which it was built.

=== Operation ===
In 2002, the Renewables Obligation (Scotland) legislation was introduced. It was conceived as a way to promote the development of small-scale hydro-electric, wave power, tidal power, photovoltaics, wind power and biomas schemes, but by the time it came into force, the definition of small scale had been increased from 5 MW to 10 MW and then 20 MW, and existing hydro-electric stations that had been refurbished to improve efficiency could be included. Kilmelfort at 2.5 MW was thus included, and between 2004 and 2007 the station qualified for 38,441 Renewable Obligation Certificates, generating a subsidy for SSE of over £1,815,000. The compensation set also qualified for 1,843 certificates, generating £87,001 in the same period.

Documents produced by Lindsay for the design of the scheme were kept by his architectural practice after his death in 1966, but in 1973 many items were given to the National Monuments Record of Scotland, and further acquisitions were made between then and 1992. His archive now consists of around 26,000 drawings and plans.

== Hydrology ==
The surface level of Oude Dam is 367 feet (112 m) above Ordnance datum (AOD), it covers 25 acres (10 ha), and drains an area of 8.87 square miles (22.97 km^{2}). Loch Tralaig is located at 440 feet (134 m) AOD, has a surface area of 0.29 square miles (0.75 km^{2}) and a catchment area of 4.68 square miles (12.12 km^{2}). Loch Cheallair is located at 843 feet (257 m), and has a surface area of just 7.4 acres (3 ha). Loch na Sreinge is at 778 feet (237 m) AOD, has a surface area of 0.08 square miles (0.21 km^{2}) and drains an area of 1.15 square miles (2.98 km^{2})

The River Oude is crossed by three bridges carrying minor roads below Loch Tralaig dam, and by the A816 Lochgilphead to Oban road above the northern end of Oude Dam. The Eas Tarsuinn, on which there is a dam and a sluice, joins the Oude at the southern end of the Pass of Melfort below Oude Dam. The river flows over a weir, to the west of which the tunnel from Oude Dam ends and the surface pipeline begins. In the vicinity of the power station, there are three more bridges, including the one that provides access to the station, and one carrying the road from Kilmelford to Melfort. Shortly afterwards, the river flows into the sea at Fearnach Bay, part of Loch Melfort.

== Bibliography ==
- Dekker, Nick (2008). "Public Petition No. PE1184" (PDF). Scottish Parliament. Archived (PDF) from the original on 10 January 2024.
- Miller, James (2002). The Dam Builders - Power from the Glens. Birlinn. ISBN 978-1-84158-225-2.
- Payne, Peter L (1988). The Hydro. Aberdeen University Press. ISBN 978-0-08-036584-8.
- Reeves, Julian, ed. (2018). Power from the Glens - 75th Anniversary edition. SSE. ISBN 978-1-5272-2500-8.
- Swap (June 2005). "Subsidies and Subterfuge" (PDF). Scottish Wind Assessment Project. Archived (PDF) from the original on 11 October 2022.
- Wood, Emma (2002). The Hydro Boys. Luath Press. ISBN 978-1-84282-016-2.
