= Storr Lochs Hydro-Electric Scheme =

Power station on Isle of Skye, Scotland

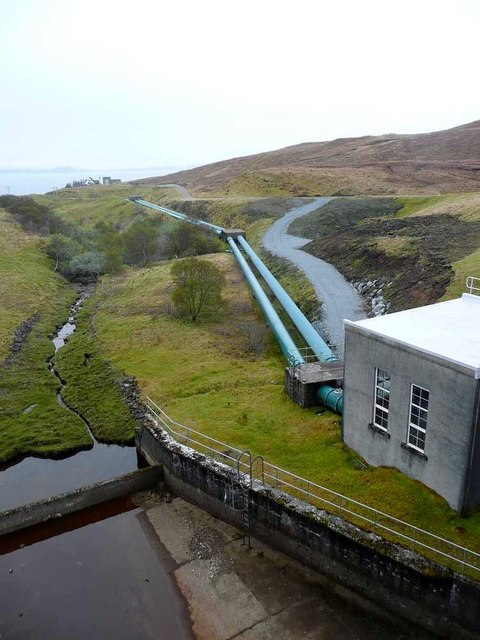
- Pipes running from Storr Lochs Dam towards the power station

- Location within Highland
- Country: Scotland
- Location: Isle of Skye
- Coordinates: 57.4967°N 6.1455°W
- Purpose: Power
- Status: Operational
- Construction began: 1950
- Opening date: 1952
- Owner: SSE

Storr Lochs is a hydro-electric power station built on the Isle of Skye, Inner Hebrides, Scotland and commissioned in 1952. It was built by the North of Scotland Hydro-Electric Board, and used water from Lochs Leathan and Fada, to provide the first general supply of electricity to the island. Because the location of the turbine house was not easily accessible, it is served by an electric funicular railway.

The original two turbines were supplemented by a third in 1956, and it continued to operate until the 2010s. By that time, it was becoming difficult to maintain, and it was upgraded in 2017, when two new turbines were installed, and most of the ancillary services were upgraded, allowing it to be controlled from Scottish and Southern Energy's control centre in Perth.

== History ==
The North of Scotland Hydro-Electric Board was created by the Hydro-electric Development (Scotland) Act 1943, a measure championed by the politician Tom Johnston while he was Secretary of State for Scotland. Johnston's vision was for a public body that could build hydro-electric stations throughout the Highlands. Profits made by selling bulk electricity to the Scottish lowlands would be used to fund "the economic development and social improvement of the North of Scotland." Private consumers would be offered a supply of cheap electricity, and their connection to that supply would not reflect the actual cost of its provision in remote and sparsely populated areas.

Prior to its construction, electricity supply on Skye was patchy. A diesel generator supplied power to parts of Portree, while the village of Broadford was supplied from the power station at Nostie Bridge on the Scottish mainland by a cable that ran for 10 miles (16 km) under the sea. A switching-on ceremony was held at Kyleakin on 6 May 1947, to inaugurate the undersea supply from Nostie to Broadford, at which Lady Mackenzie presided. The cable was sized to supply 85 per cent of the population of Skye, but once the formal opening ceremony had been completed, Edward MacColl, the chief executive of the North of Scotland Hydro-Electric Board, was able to announce that the Storr Lochs scheme had just been approved by the Electricity Commissioners.

The Board received permission to proceed with the construction of the project in late 1949, and work began in early 1950. Water was supplied by Loch Fada and Loch Leathan, which are situated between the main road from Portree to Staffin and the sea. The turbine house was located on the shore at Bearreraig Bay, separated from the lochs by a 350-foot (110 m) cliff. In order to overcome the difficulties of accessing this site, a funicular railway was built at the start of the project, and used to transport men and materials down to the shore. The formation for the railway included 647 steps cast into the concrete. The railway is standard gauge with a maximum gradient of 1 in 2, and an electric winch controls the movement of the single carriage. Prior to its construction, the Board anticipated that materials could be brought to the beach by landing craft, but the loss of one vessel and all the equipment it was carrying due to the fierce tides resulted in this approach being abandoned.

The turbine house had a slate roof and was clad in local stone, so that it would blend in with its surroundings. A dam was constructed across the Bearreraig River to raise the level of Loch Leathan, which included screens to prevent debris entering the pipeline. A long wing wall was built across the surrounding hillside, to provide additional stability to the dam, because of the boggy nature of the terrain. A single pipeline was initially run from the valve house by the dam to the turbine house, but the formation was made wide enough to accommodate a second pipeline, and this was added in 1956.

The turbine house was equipped with two 1 MW Francis turbines, which was sufficient to supply the whole of Skye. The consulting engineers were Blyth and Blyth of Edinburgh, while construction was carried out by James Miller and Partners, also from Edinburgh. The official opening took place on 31 May 1952, when Lady Rachel Stuart, wife of the Secretary of State for Scotland, James Stuart, started the turbines. Tom Johnston was by this time chairman of the North of Scotland Hydro-Electric Board, and used the occasion to say that despite those who felt that electricity was unnecessary, because the Highlanders were satisfied with their oil lamps, 850 houses were already connected to the grid, and this total would rise to 2500 during 1953. The cost of the scheme was £247,000, and initially it could supply 5.5 GWh of electricity per year. The population of Skye at the time was 10,500.

A house for the station attendant called Bearreraig Cottage was built on the Portree to Staffin road, and a second house for another attendant was constructed near the winch house in the 1960s. In 1956, the scheme was upgraded. The single 42-inch (1,100 mm) pipeline was duplicated, and a third 1 MW generator was added in the turbine house. Subsequently, Loch Fada was connected to Loch Leathan by constructing a channel between the two, so that its water could be used to supplement the supply from Loch Leathan at times when rainfall was low.

The station could produce 2.85 MW of power. Loch Leathan covers an area of 300 acres (120 ha) and draws its water from a catchment of 3,586 acres (1,451 ha). Its surface level is 136 metres (446 ft) above Ordnance datum (AOD). Loch Fada is smaller, covering an area of 82 acres (33 ha) and having a catchment of 1,024 acres (414 ha). Its surface level is 476 feet (145 m) AOD.

=== Upgrade ===
After nearly 70 years of operation, during which time it produced around 8 GWh of power per year, the station was becoming difficult to maintain, and the lack of automation meant that site visits were necessary whenever adjustments needed to be made. In the mid-2010s Scottish and Southern Energy (SSE), who inherited the scheme when the electricity industry was privatised, decided that a complete upgrade of the station was necessary. The original turbines were replaced by two new ones, supplied by Voith Group, which incorporate automatic adjustment of the guide vanes by an autonomous hydraulic control unit. It was the first time that this system had been used for a small hydro-electricity plant. Most of the testing could be carried out off-site, significantly reducing disruption to the generation of power.

Site Drilling Specialists were responsible for removal of the original turbines, and used a diamond wire saw to cut the concrete foundations into blocks small enough to enable them to be removed by the funicular railway. In parallel with the turbine replacement, the low-voltage distribution and protection systems were replaced, and a modern control system using programmable logic controllers was installed, linked to a graphical display system, which is accessible from SSE's main control centre in Perth. Servelec Controls supplied the automation, which included telemetry links between the turbine house, the winch house and the valve house. All of the upgrade work was completed by the end of 2017.

== Bibliography ==
- Miller, James (2002). The Dam Builders - Power from the Glens. Birlinn. ISBN 978-1-84158-225-2.
- Patel, Sonal (2018). "Small Hydro Innovation Revitalizes Scotland's Storr Lochs Plant". Power Magazine. Archived from the original on 3 July 2022.
- Payne, Peter L (1988). The Hydro. Aberdeen University Press. ISBN 978-0-08-036584-8.
- Wood, Emma (2002). The Hydro Boys. Luath Press. ISBN 978-1-84282-016-2.
