= Loch Dubh =

Loch Dubh ("Black Loch") may refer to the following lochs in Scotland:

- Loch Dubh, Loch Ard Forest
- Dubh Loch, Glen Muick, in Aberdeenshire, Scotland
- Loch Dubh, Argyll, inflow River Shira, outflow River Garron, into Loch Fyne, in Argyll and Bute, Scotland

or to

- Loch Dubh Hydro-Electric Scheme in Ross and Cromarty, Scotland
