= Loch Dubh Hydro-Electric Scheme =

Power station near Ullapool, Scotland

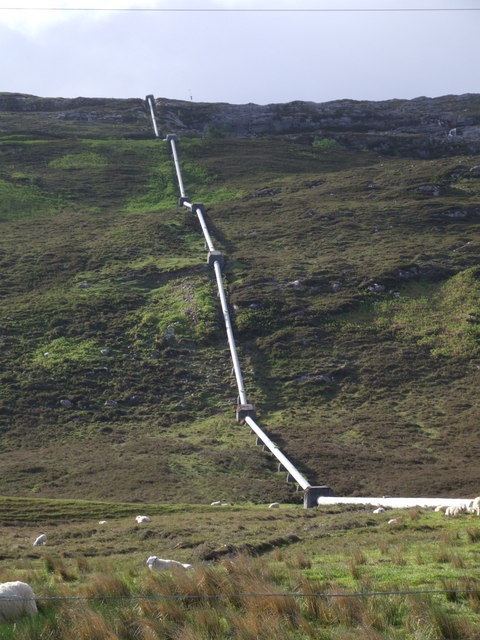
- The pipeline that feeds Loch Dubh power station

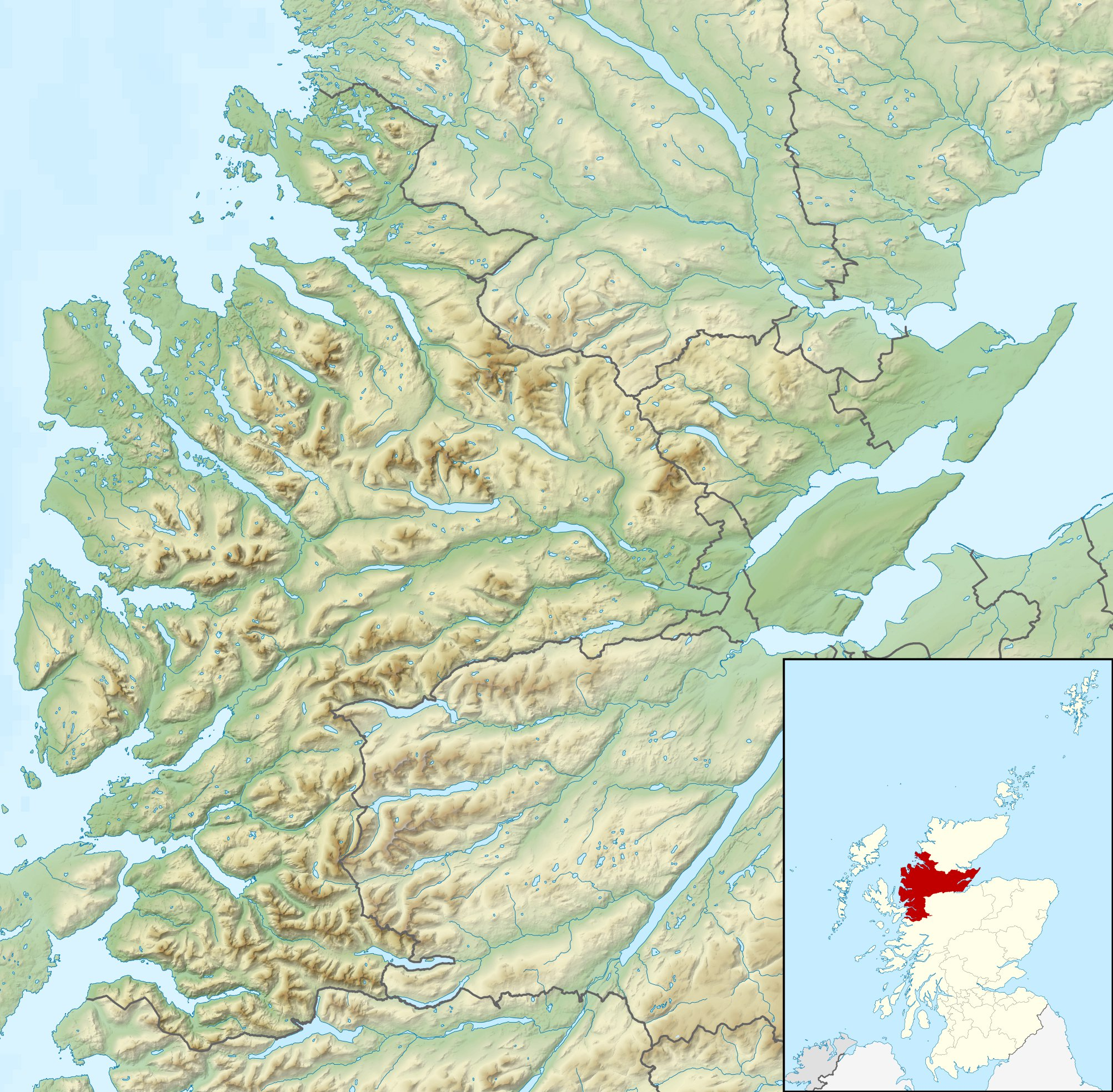
- Location within Ross and Cromarty
- Country: Scotland
- Location: Ullapool, Ross and Cromarty
- Coordinates: 57.9618°N 5.1299°W
- Purpose: Power
- Status: Operational
- Opening date: 1955
- Owner: SSE

Loch Dubh Hydro-Electric Scheme is a small-scale hydro-electric power station, built by the North of Scotland Hydro-Electric Board and commissioned in 1955. It is located near Ullapool in Ross and Cromarty, Scotland. It was originally designed to supply power to the remote communities around Ullapool, but is now connected to the National Grid.

== History ==
The North of Scotland Hydro-Electric Board was created by the Hydro-electric Development (Scotland) Act 1943, a measure championed by the politician Tom Johnston while he was Secretary of State for Scotland. Johnston's vision was for a public body that could build hydro-electric stations throughout the Highlands. Profits made by selling bulk electricity to the Scottish lowlands would be used to fund "the economic development and social improvement of the North of Scotland." Private consumers would be offered a supply of cheap electricity, and their connection to that supply would not reflect the actual cost of its provision in remote and sparsely populated areas.

The chairman of the new Board was to be Lord Airlie, who had initially been critical of the 1943 Act because its scope was too limited. The deputy chairman and chief executive was Edward MacColl, an engineer with wide experience of hydro-electric projects and electrical distribution networks. It soon became clear that MacColl intended to push ahead with the aspirations of the Act at breakneck speeds. He produced a list of 102 potential sites in just three months, and in June 1944, the first constructional scheme was published. This was for the Loch Sloy scheme, which had a ready market for bulk supplies to nearby Clydeside, but it included two smaller schemes, to demonstrate the Board's commitment to supplying remote areas.

Loch Dubh was another small scheme, designed to supply the remote village of Ullapool. It is located about 4 miles (6.4 km) to the north of Ullapool, and is fed by a number of lochs located to the south of the turbine house. The principal one consists of Loch Dubh and Loch Ob an Lochain, which were once separate, but have become one because the dam built across the river that formed the northern outlet of Loch Dubh has raised the water level of both. It flows into Loch Beinne Deirg, which has also increased in size significantly due to the presence of a second dam on the river below its outlet. To the east of Loch Beinne Deirg is Loch na Maoile, which is joined to Loch Bad na h-Achlaise since the dam on the western outlet of Loch na Maoile was constructed. Further east is Loch Cnoc a' Choilich or Loch Maoile, while to the north Loch Bad nan Calman feeds water into the system. A network of small lochs and streams drain the foothills of Beinn Donuill and Cnoc a' Choilich, flowing into the main lochs.

The dam that creates Loch Dubh is the furthest upstream of the three dams that were built, and Loch Dubh is the main source of water for the power station. It is a concrete gravity dam, the downstream face of which is flared, and it includes fixed spillways to allow excess water to overflow into Loch Beinne Deirg. From Loch Beinne Deirg dam, a surface pipeline descends into Strath Canaird, which is occupied by the River Canaird. The turbine house is located on the left bank of the river and contains two turbines made by Gilkes of Kendal, which have a combined output of 1.2 MW. The tailrace discharges into the river.

Structures for the scheme were designed by the architect James Shearer, who was one of the architectural advisors for the North of Scotland Hydro-Electric Board. The Board appointed three Scottish architects to act as architectural advisors in 1943, and their role was to judge competitive entries submitted by others, but by 1947 this model had been abandoned, and Shearer, together with Reginald Fairlie and Harold Tarbolton designed the buildings themselves.

The scheme was the North of Scotland Hydro-Electric Board's Constructional Scheme no.20, and the order to authorise it was laid before Parliament and signed on 8 March 1949. The scheme was commissioned in 1955. In early 1957, Lord Lucas of Chilworth asked questions in the House of Lords about the costs of Scottish hydro-electricity. Lord Strathclyde stated that for Loch Dubh, the capital cost of the project was £366 per kW, the third highest of the 27 schemes mentioned, and considerably higher than the average cost of £175 per kW, reflecting the remote location in which it was built.

=== Operation ===
In 2002, the Renewables Obligation (Scotland) legislation was introduced. It was conceived as a way to promote the development of small-scale hydro-electric, wave power, tidal power, photovoltaics, wind power and biomas schemes, but by the time it came into force, the definition of small scale had been increased from 5 MW to 10 MW and then 20 MW, and existing hydro-electric stations that had been refurbished to improve efficiency could be included. Loch Dubh at 1.2 MW thus qualified, and between 2003 and 2007 the station qualified for 14,292 Renewable Obligation Certificates, generating a subsidy for SSE of nearly £691,000. Both turbines at the station were refurbished in the two-year period prior to April 2008.

Shearer produced a large amount of documentation relating to the scheme, including two boxes containing job files and lots of prints and drawings. His architectural practice continued after his death in 1962, but when it closed in 1994, the records were given to the Royal Incorporation of Architects in Scotland. The archive, which consists of over 20,000 drawings and 205 boxes of manuscripts, is currently in the care of Historic Environment Scotland.

== Hydrology ==
The surface level of Loch Dubh and Loch Ob an Lochain is 633 feet (193 m) above Ordnance datum (AOD), they cover 0.27 square miles (0.70 km^{2}), and drain an area of 2.92 square miles (7.56 km^{2}). Loch Beinn Deirg is located at 178 metres (584 ft) AOD, is smaller with a surface area of 0.058 square miles (0.15 km^{2}) but has a catchment area of 4.81 square miles (12.46 km^{2}). Loch Bad na h-Achlaise and Loch na Maoile are both at the same level of 614 feet (187 m). Together, they cover an area of 0.116 square miles (0.30 km^{2}) and have a catchment of 1.69 square miles (4.4 km^{2}). The rest of the lochs are relatively small, with Loch Maoile or Cnoc a'Choilich at 646 feet (197 m) AOD and Loch a' Choire Bhuig at 748 feet (228 m) AOD.

== Bibliography ==
- Dekker, Nick (2008). "Public Petition No. PE1184" (PDF). Scottish Parliament. Archived (PDF) from the original on 10 January 2024.
- Fleetwood, David; et al. (2010). MacDowell, Dawn (ed.). Power to the People - the built heritage of Scotland's hydroelectric power. Historic Scotland. ISBN 978-1-84917-036-9.
- Miller, James (2002). The Dam Builders - Power from the Glens. Birlinn. ISBN 978-1-84158-225-2.
- Payne, Peter L (1988). The Hydro. Aberdeen University Press. ISBN 978-0-08-036584-8.
- Swap (June 2005). "Subsidies and Subterfuge" (PDF). Scottish Wind Assessment Project. Archived (PDF) from the original on 11 October 2022.
- Wood, Emma (2002). The Hydro Boys. Luath Press. ISBN 978-1-84282-016-2.
