= Registered power zone =

A registered power zone (RPZ) is an area of the National Grid (UK) network, geographical or electrical, specifically designated for the research, development and demonstration (R,D&D) of new technologies concerning the power network. Specifically to develop solutions to the problems associated with connecting generating capacity at the distribution network level.

== Current RPZ ==
There are currently three registered power zones in the UK, operated by different distribution network operators:

1. Skegness and The Fens, operated by Central Networks
2. Island of Orkney, operated by Scottish Hydro Electric
3. Marsham primary, operated by EDF Energy

== Future development ==
The scheme has been successful in initializing development of tools, computer software and devices to facilitate the connection of distributed/embedded generation. This is essential to the growth of renewable energy usage in the UK. It is hoped that the most successful outputs of the RPZ schemes can be rolled out nationwide after 2010.
