= Nostie =

Human settlement and power station in Scotland

Coordinates: 57.28391°N 5.55153°W

Nostie: Scottish Gaelic: Ceann na Mòna
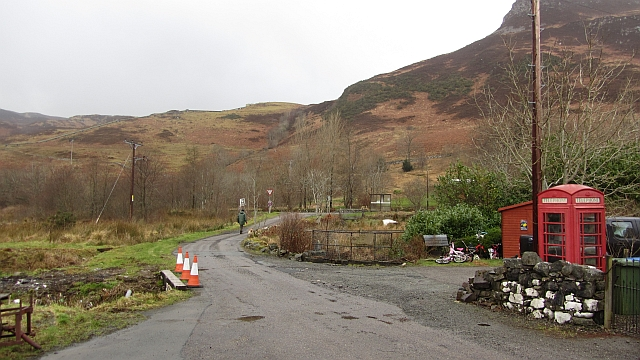
- The road through Nostie, looking towards the A87 junction

- Location within the Highland council area
- OS grid reference: NG860270
- Council area: Highland
- Country: Scotland
- Sovereign state: United Kingdom
- Post town: Kyle of Lochalsh
- Postcode district: IV40 8
- Police: Scotland
- Fire: Scottish
- Ambulance: Scottish

Nostie (Scottish Gaelic: Ceann na Mòna) is a small remote hamlet, lying on Nostie Bay, an inlet at the northeastern end of the sea loch, Loch Alsh in the Scottish Highlands and is in the council area of Highland. Nostie lies a short distance from one of Scotland's popular tourist attractions, Eilean Donan Castle.

It is the location of one of the three hydro-electric stations that formed the first schemes to be implemented by the North of Scotland Hydro-Electric Board following its formation in 1943. Construction began in May 1946, and the power station was built of stone to blend in with its surroundings. This decision informed most of the work of the board, and revived the dying art of stone-masonry in the Highlands. The station was completed in 1948, and was opened in December by Miss Macrae from Conchra.

During a severe drought in 1955, workers using hand tools constructed nearly 1 mile (1.6 km) of channel to enable water from Loch na Smeòraich to supplement the supply in Lochalsh Dam. In 2016, the output of the station was increased by fitting a Pelton turbine into the compensation flow, which maintains the habitat in the Allt Gleann Udalain.

== Notable residents ==
It is the home of the well known young Scottish harpist, Murdo Macrae. He was born there, the second son of Farquar Macrae, a hill farmer and Susie Macrae, a dentist, both of whom were musical. He began to play the piano when he was five, and discovered the harp at Plockton primary school when he was nine. After finishing his schooling at Sleat on the Isle of Skye and at Plockton High School, he went to the City of Edinburgh Music School, and subsequently began a post graduate course at Brooklyn College in New York.

Nostie was also the home village of the late Reverend Kenneth MacLeod.

== Hydro-electricity ==
The politician Tom Johnston during his time as Secretary of State for Scotland, championed the Hydro-electric Development (Scotland) Act 1943, which created the North of Scotland Hydro-Electric Board. Johnston's vision was for a public body that could build hydro-electric stations throughout the Highlands. Profits made by selling bulk electricity to the Scottish lowlands would be used to fund "the economic development and social improvement of the North of Scotland." Private consumers would be offered a supply of cheap electricity, and their connection to that supply would not reflect the actual cost of its provision in remote and sparsely populated areas.

The chairman of the new Board was to be Lord Airlie, who had initially been critical of the 1943 Act because its scope was too limited. The deputy chairman and chief executive was Edward MacColl, an engineer with wide experience of hydro-electric projects and electrical distribution networks. It soon became clear that MacColl intended to push ahead with the aspirations of the Act at breakneck speeds. He produced a list of 102 potential sites in just three months, and in June 1944, the first constructional scheme was published. This was for the Loch Sloy scheme, which had a ready market for bulk supplies to nearby Clydeside, but it included two smaller schemes, to demonstrate the Board's commitment to supplying remote areas. These were at Morar and Kyle of Lochalsh. The estimated cost of the two smaller schemes was £0.5 million, compared to £4.1 million for the Sloy development. Implementation was delayed, because although there were no objections to the two smaller schemes, there was vigorous opposition to the Sloy scheme, and a public inquiry was held to consider the objections. John Cameron KC decided that the objectors had failed to convince him that the scheme was not in the public interest, and the three schemes were authorised on 28 March 1945.

The Lochalsh scheme would be built at Nostie Bridge, where the A87 road crosses the Allt Gleann Udalain, just to the west of the hamlet, by the engineers Sir William Halcrow and Partners. Construction began after a pole raising ceremony was held at the power station site in May 1946. The single dam that was built was seen as the first part of a scheme that could be extended by the construction of a second dam, further up the Allt Gleann Udalain, which would increase the capacity of the system to 4 MW, but with the National Grid yet to reach the remoter areas of Scotland, one dam would provide enough power for the Lochalsh and Loch Carron local distribution network, which covered around 144 square miles (370 km^{2}). The population of the area was 2,400, and the scheme would serve around 95 percent of the people. As an interim measure, a diesel generator was used to supply the area, which also provided power to a local network in the south-east of the Isle of Skye, connected to it by a submarine cable. The installed capacity of the Nostie Bridge station was 1.25 MW.

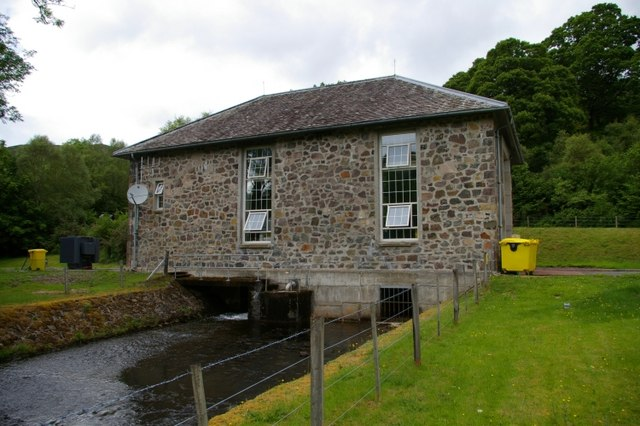
Nostie Bridge power station, showing the stone construction. The tailrace discharges into the river soon after leaving the station.

James Shearer was one of three members of the Panel of Architectural Advisors to the Board, and he was asked to carry out the architectural work for the Lochalsh scheme. The civil engineers stated that they wanted a rectangular brick building with a slate roof. Shearer visited the site, and noted that all of the buildings in the area were built of local stone, in a style which he called cottage architecture. He began to wonder whether it would be possible to use stone for the power station, despite the fact that building with stone was a dying art. With some trepidation, he approached MacColl to discuss his proposal, and found that MacColl was in complete agreement with the concept. He asked Shearer to produce a list of sources for the material, and to find contractors who could muster enough quarrymen and masons to ensure the success of the idea. Implementation was not without its difficulties, but these were gradually overcome, and the Lochalsh Power Station at Nostie was completed in 1948. It was officially opened on 21 December by Miss Macrae from Conchra, with Tom Johnston overseeing the proceedings. The smaller station at Morar was designed by Reginald Fairlie, another member of the Panel of Architectural Advisors. It was also built of stone and opened on the same day. The decision to use stone informed most of the projects undertaken by the North of Scotland Hydro-Electric Board subsequently. Smaller buildings were built of stone, while larger ones were clad with it.

=== Infrastructure ===
A reservoir for the power station was formed by constructing a dam across Gleann Udalain. This is a mass gravity structure, with the top of the dam forming the spillway for most of its width. A walkway is carried over the dam supported by a continuous row of arches. The dam is 250 feet (76 m) long and 56 feet (17 m) high in the centre of the valley. The reservoir is known as Lochalsh Dam, covers an area of 30 acres (12 ha), and its surface level is 502 feet (153 m) above ordnance datum (AOD). Its catchment area is 7.938 square miles (20.56 km^{2}), with most of the water flowing into it from the Allt Gleann Udalain, but this is fed by an extensive network of tributary streams stretching to the north east, which drain the land between Loch Carron to the north-west and Loch Long to the south-east.

Just below the dam is a weir, where a valve house routes most of the water discharged from the dam into a steel pipeline. This is initially 33 inches (840 mm) in diameter, and is encased in concrete. It follows the contours of the valley, and is reinforced whenever the route changes direction. Further down, it changes to twin 24-inch (610 mm) pipelines, and only the joins where it changes direction are encased in concrete. It runs on the surface, broadly parallel to the Allt Gleann Udalain, to a point just to the north of the A87 road. The final small section to Nostie Bridge power station, which is immediately to the south of the road, runs underground. The outflow from the station rejoins the river a short distance to the south-east, which flows over a weir and is crossed by a bridge carrying the road through Nostie. In the early 20th century, there was a footbridge, a ford and stepping stones at this point. The bridge forms the highest point to which tides flow, and the river then enters Nostie Bay and Loch Alsh.

In 1955, there was a severe drought in the Highlands, and water levels in Lochalsh Dam dropped sufficiently that reductions in the amount of power produced seemed likely. In order to resolve the problem, workers constructed nearly 1 mile (1.6 km) of channel to enable water from Loch na Smeòraich to supplement the supply in Lochalsh Dam. The work was carried out using hand tools.

In 2016, Gilkes, a subsidiary of Gilbert Gilkes & Gordon of Kendal, Cumbria, supplied a new Pelton turbine which enables the compensation flow released to maintain the habitat in the Allt Gleann Udalain to be used to generate extra electricity. The machine was fitted with manual spear valves, which were adjusted during the commissioning phase to ensure that the regulatory compensation flow would be released whatever the level of the reservoir. To prevent damage to the turbine if the load is suddenly removed, it is fitted with a deflector system, that ensures the flow is still able to pass without spinning the turbine.

=== Operation ===
In 2002, the Renewables Obligation (Scotland) legislation was introduced. It was conceived as a way to promote the development of small-scale hydro-electric, wave power, tidal power, photovoltaics, wind power and biomas schemes, but by the time it came into force, the definition of small scale had been increased from 5 MW to 10 MW and then 20 MW, and existing hydro-electric stations that had been refurbished to improve efficiency could be included. Nostie Bridge at 1.3 MW thus qualified, and between 2003 and 2007 the station qualified for 22,390 Renewable Obligation Certificates, generating a subsidy for SSE of nearly £1,042,000. Between 2004 and 2007 the station operated at an average load factor of 47.2 percent.

== Bibliography ==
- Dekker, Nick (2008). "Public Petition No. PE1184" (PDF). Scottish Parliament. Archived (PDF) from the original on 10 January 2024.
- Fraser, Norrie, ed. (1956). Sir Edward MacColl - A maker of modern Scotland. Edinburgh: Stanley Press.
- Miller, James (2002). The Dam Builders - Power from the Glens. Birlinn. ISBN 978-1-84158-225-2.
- NoSHEB (1948). Constructional Schemes. North of Scotland Hydro-Electric Board.
- Payne, Peter L (1988). The Hydro. Aberdeen University Press. ISBN 978-0-08-036584-8.
- Swap (June 2005). "Subsidies and Subterfuge" (PDF). Scottish Wind Assessment Project. Archived (PDF) from the original on 11 October 2022.
- Whitlock, Robin (1 August 2016). "Gilkes awarded contract for hydro turbines on three SSE sites". Archived from the original on 22 September 2017.
- Wood, Emma (2002). The Hydro Boys. Luath Press. ISBN 978-1-84282-016-2.
