= James Shearer =

Scottish architect (1881–1962)

James Grant Shearer
- Born: 6 April 1881; Dunfermline, Scotland
- Died: 20 December 1962 (aged 81); Dunfermline, Scotland
- Education: Dunfermline High School
- Occupation: Architect
- Known for: Work with North of Scotland Hydro-Electric Board

James Shearer (1881–1962) was a Scottish architect, active in the early and middle twentieth century. He was based in Dunfermline, but worked on projects covering much of Scotland. He is particularly noted for his work for The Scottish Youth Hostel Association, now called Hostelling Scotland, the Carnegie United Kingdom Trust, which was also based in Dunfermline, and the North of Scotland Hydro-Electric Board.

== Early life ==
James Grant Shearer was the son of James Shearer, a manufacturer of linen and a designer of damask patterns, and his first wife Agnes Donaldson Smith. The family had settled in Dunfermline prior to 1854, after his grandfather, another James, had moved there from Craigellachie, Banffshire. The younger James was born at Morton Lodge, Dunfermline on 6 April 1881, and later attended Dunfermline High School, before beginning an apprenticeship with Thomas Hislop Ure in September 1897. In November 1901, he obtained a job as an assistant at John Burnet & Son in Glasgow, and was promoted to senior assistant in 1902. While working in Glasgow, he also attended courses at the Glasgow School of Art. In March 1906, he resigned from Burnet's practice, and nearly a year later, set up his own practice at 1 Bonnar Street Dunfermline in February 1907. He married Jessie Gorrie, the daughter of a local solicitor called David Gorrie in 1914, but was conscripted in August 1916, serving with the Royal Highland Regiment and then the Royal Engineers from 1917. His time in the army ended in February 1919, and he restarted his architectural practice straight away, moving his offices to Queen Anne Street around 1920.

== Career ==
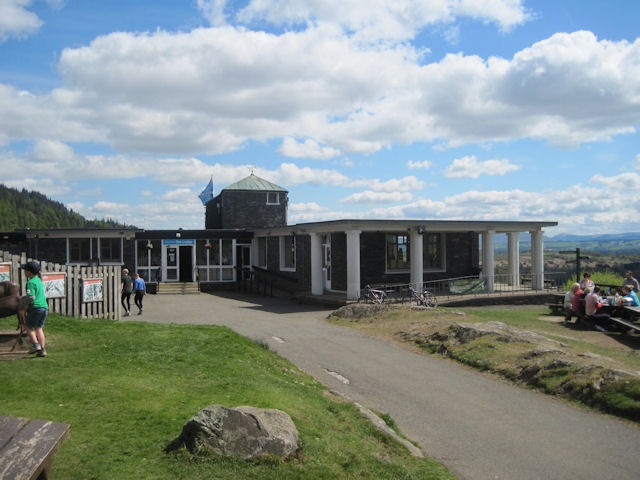
David Marshall Lodge at Aberfoyle, built as a youth hostel by Shearer and now a visitor centre

Like many architects, his early work centred on extending and altering existing buildings, such as the City Arms Hotel in Dunfermline, which he completed around 1910. He designed an extension for Carnock Primary School in 1912, a house for himself at Crossford in 1914, and worked on the Savings Bank at Dunfermline in 1915. He also tackled a number of industrial buildings, including the Caledonia Works at Dunfermline around 1909 and Fordell Colliery between 1912 and 1914. From the 1920s, he formed a productive relationship with the Carnegie Dunfermline Trust and the Carnegie United Kingdom Trust, which included reconstructing St Mary's Hall Dunfermline in 1924, and the addition of a memorial building to the Andrew Carnegie Birthplace Museum. This was designed in 17th century Scottish baronial style with crowstepped gables, and the main hall includes clerestory dormers. Because of its stylistic interest, this newer addition is a listed building in its own right.

A notable departure from his traditional building styles was Dunfermline fire station, built in modernist Art Deco-International style between 1934 and 1936. It ceased to be used as a fire station in 2010, but is a category B listed building. He was appointed as the town planning consultant for Dunfermline in 1938, and also for Clackmannan in 1944. From 1940 to 1943 he worked for the Scottish Youth Hostels Association, advising them on the conversion of large country houses into youth hostels. He was responsible for the David Marshall Lodge youth hostel at Aberfoyle, built with drystone slate rubble and incorporating a central tower from which the surrounding landscape can be viewed. It is now the Queen Elizabeth Forest Park visitor centre, run by the Forestry Commission, and is a category B listed building.

=== North of Scotland Hydro-Electric Board ===
The creation of the North of Scotland Hydro-Electric Board, as a result of the passing of the Hydro-electric Development (Scotland) Act 1943, gave Shearer some of his greatest opportunities. The Act was championed by the politician Tom Johnston while he was Secretary of State for Scotland. Johnston's vision was for a public body that could build hydro-electric stations throughout the Highlands. Profits made by selling bulk electricity to the Scottish lowlands would be used to fund "the economic development and social improvement of the North of Scotland." Private consumers would be offered a supply of cheap electricity, and their connection to that supply would not reflect the actual cost of its provision in remote and sparsely populated areas.

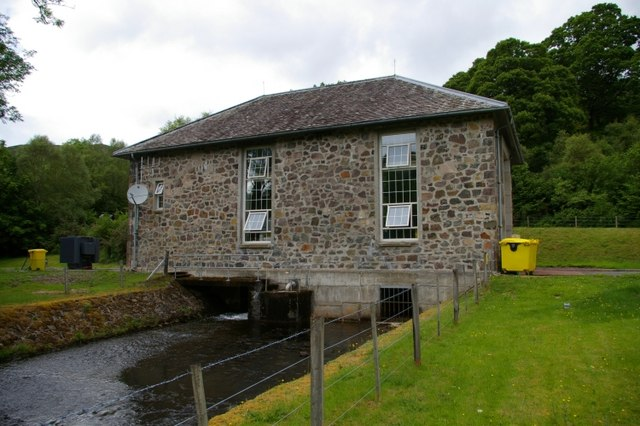
Nostie Bridge power station, showing the stone construction that Shearer pioneered.

Originally, the Board were going to have just one architectural advisor, and the Royal Institute of British Architects put forward two names. However, the Board then decided that they would have three advisors, all of whom were to be resident in Scotland. They chose Reginald Fairlie, Harold Tarbolton and Shearer, who had all accepted their positions in principle by January 1944, and were subsequently appointed. They would supervise the construction of power stations, utility buildings such as gate houses and valve houses on the numerous tunnels which were constructed, and housing for the staff of the Board. Work for the Board would be a significant part of Shearer's life for the next 18 years.

Shortly after his appointment, Shearer was asked to work on three projects, the Affric-Beauly scheme, the Fannich scheme on the River Conon, and the much smaller Lochalsh scheme, with a single power station at Nostie Bridge. The engineers specified that they wanted a brick box with a slate roof to house the machinery, but a site visit convinced him that brick would be an intrusion in a landscape where every other building was made of stone. He described the style as "cottage architecture", and wondered whether it could be used to make a power station that would blend into the landscape harmoniously. Since the skills needed to work with stone had all but died out, he approached Edward MacColl the chief executive of the Board with some trepidation, but found that he was in complete agreement with the idea. MacColl asked him to find sources of stone and contractors who could muster a sufficient number of masons and quarrymen to handle the work. The power station opened on 21 December 1948, on the same day as the Morar station, which was designed by Fairlie, but was also constructed in stone. They were the first of the Board's stations to become operational.

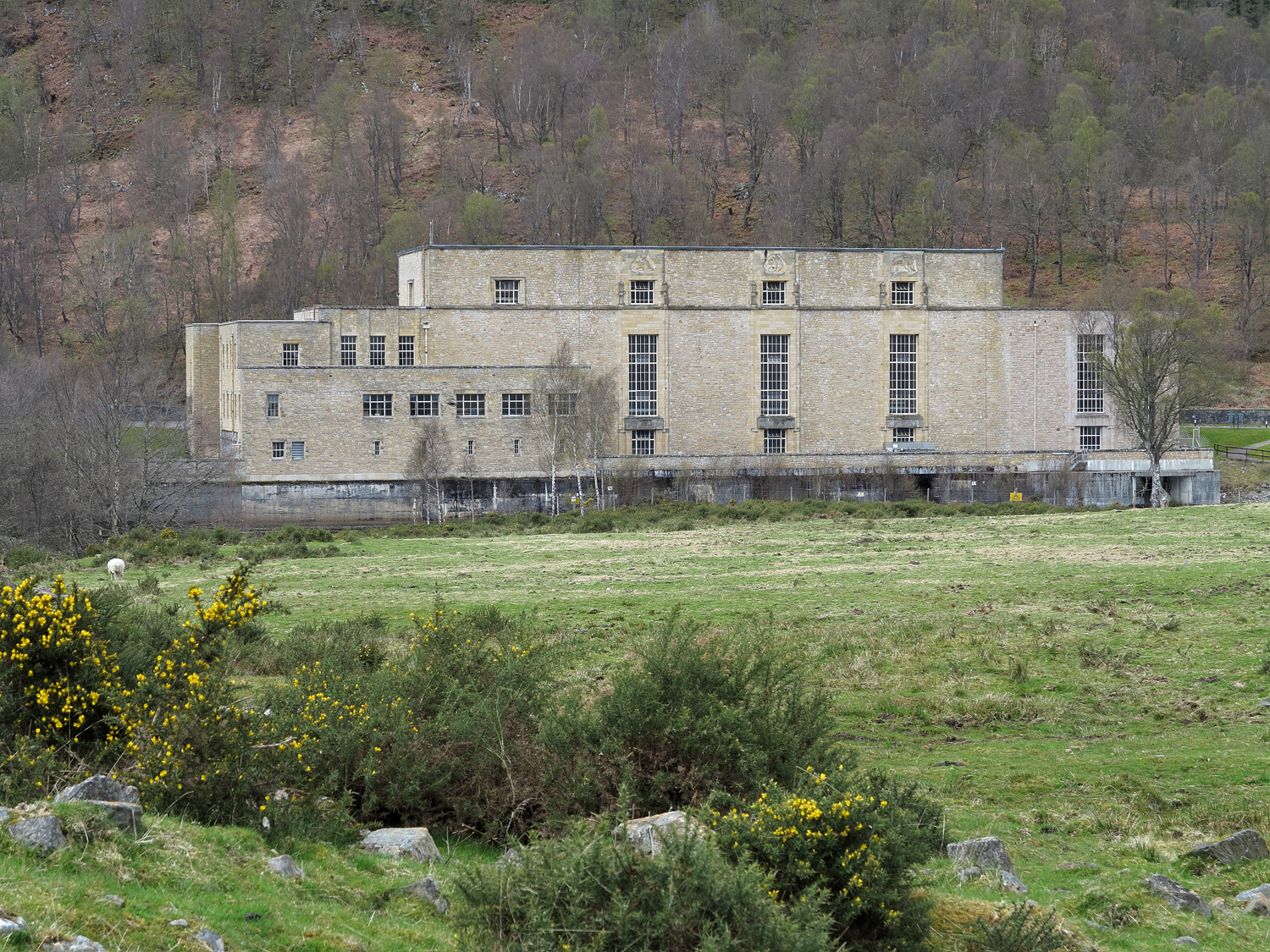
Fasnakyle power station is a fine example of Shearer's work, and is a Category A listed structure.

When designing Grudie Bridge power station, on the River Conon, Shearer did not think that such a large structure could be built of stone either economically, or within a reasonable time scale, so he prepared drawings for a concrete, steel and glass structure. MacColl studied the drawings and asked Shearer whether he had ever seen a concrete building that had been exposed to Scottish weather for 20 years. Shearer admitted that he had only ever seen new concrete structures, so MacColl proposed a weekend in which they would visit concrete buildings that were older, to see whether Shearer still felt that concrete was a suitable medium for such projects. The weekend convinced him that concrete did not weather well, and the idea of cladding the buildings in stone was conceived. Shearer then spent time investigating potential sources of stone, but found that many quarries had closed down. Two quarries were still in production, and large orders were placed, effectively revitalising a dying industry. They were Greendale Quarry at Hopeman near Elgin and Tarradale Quarry, near Muir of Ord. The station at Fasnakyle, in Glen Affric, is now a category A listed building, as it is an outstanding example of a large power station, and "a preeminent example of the design ideals of architect James Shearer who sought to integrate the large buildings such as power stations into their natural setting through the use of local stone and Pictish symbols."

On the Affric-Beauly scheme, Fasnakyle and Grudie Bridge power stations were built of ferro-concrete and faced with stone. Two fairly large electricity sub-stations were built, at Beauly and Fasnakyle, and these were constructed entirely of stone. MacColl looked at the costs and time required to construct buildings using both methods, and asked Shearer to investigate whether future power stations should be built entirely of stone. His conclusions, based on consultation with the General Contractor for the scheme, was that it would be quicker and slightly cheaper to build stone walls than composite walls, and a meeting was then held with the engineers to convince them of the wisdom of this approach. Accordingly, the walls of Luichart power station, part of the River Conon scheme, were built of stone, with exposed masonry internally and externally. Shearer tried to ensure that the buildings used local stone, so that they would blend into the landscape. Both Grudie Bridge and Luichart used pink sandstone from the Tarradale quarry. Fasnakyle power station used a honey-coloured stone from Burghead quarry, and Mossford power station used stone from Tain, which was a similar colour. At Deanie and Culligran, both of which were built underground, the portals to the entrance tunnels were constructed of stone that was removed from the underground chambers.

Shearer had a huge influence on the designs for the Board. Initially, the role of the architectural panel was seen as the selection of entries submitted by other architects, but this competitive model had been abandoned by 1947, and the panel became the designers. Tarbolton died later in 1947, before any of his designs had been commissioned, while Fairlie died in 1952, leaving Shearer as the main architect for all of the subsequent schemes for the next ten years.

=== Town planning ===
As well as his architectural practice, Shearer was employed part time as the planning consultant for Dunfermline between 1937 and 1948, and was also the planning consultant for Clackmannanshire Country Council between 1944 and 1947. He turned down requests to act in a similar role from Inverness in 1941, Forres in 1946 and Lerwick in 1947. In 1937, he had no previous experience of town planning, but he was a well-respected architect with a good knowledge of the town, and took the responsibilities of the post seriously. He was asked to make an advisory town plan, containing ideas and suggestions as to how Dunfermline and its communications could be improved. The town council approved the report, and used it as the basis for a statutory town plan, following the passing of the Town and Country (Scotland) Act 1947. In 1949, his plan and the accompanying report, which ran to 10,000 works, were published by the town council and the Carnegie Dunfermline Trust.

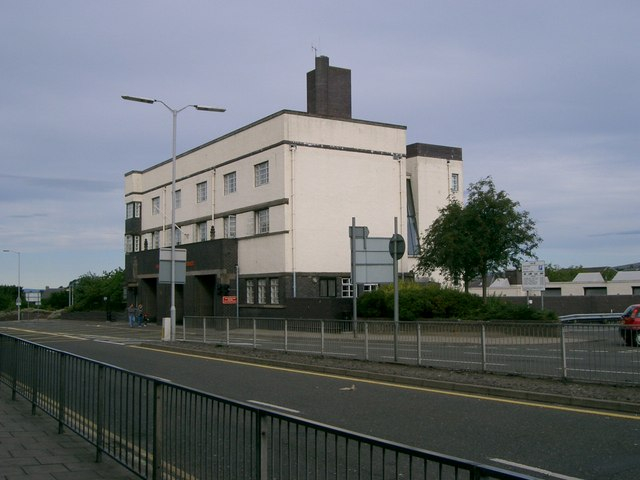
Dunfermline fire station of 1936 was one of Shearers few departures from traditional architecture

His plan proposed a number of gradual improvements that could be made to deal with issues that were likely to arise in the near future. He suggested two residential estates, each sufficiently large to support their own schools, shops and other community facilities, a civic centre with municipal buildings and separate industrial areas. The population would be limited to around 60,000 people, and new roads would reduce the number of vehicles entering the crowded town centre. He is known to have read widely to keep abreast of developments in town planning. His vision for Dunfermline was that planning would "provide comfortable, convenient and pleasant surroundings for his fellow citizens, young and old, at work and at play".

His ideas were well received by the town council, who asked him to become their full-time planning officer, a proposal which he refused because of other activity. They were also praised by the regional newspapers, and became the subject of a 20-minute documentary film, produced for the Department of Health for Scotland in 1948. It was directed by Kay Mander, who went on to work on films such as From Russia with Love and Fahrenheit 451. It was partly biographical, with an actor playing Shearer working as a town planner, and was widely shown at events in Scotland, including the Edinburgh Festival. More importantly, his plan formed the basis for Dunfermline's first development plan, produced in 1952, and that ensured that many of his ideas shaped the future development of the town.

=== Practice ===
Shearer moved back to Morton Lodge in 1931, when his father died. His wife had also died at around that time. His architectural practice was a small affair, as he only employed one or sometimes two assistants during the 1920s, and ran it single-handedly during the early 1930s. He was then joined by Peter Macdonald in 1934, by James Armstrong in 1944, and by his son James David Shearer and Edward D Armitage in 1946. His team was swelled by Marcus Johnston soon afterwards, and then by George Annand in 1949. Annand became a partner in 1952, and the partnership was known as Shearer and Annand subsequently.

He was awarded an Order of the British Empire in 1959, and continued working as an architect until his death on 20 December 1962 at the age of 81. Annand died in 1964, and the practice was then run by Shearer's son James until his early death in 1974. It continued until 1990, when it amalgamated with the practice of Mercer Blaikie, and finally closed in 1994. All of the records, consisting of over 20,000 drawings and 205 boxes of manuscripts, were given to the Royal Incorporation of Architects in Scotland, and transferred to the Royal Commission on the Ancient and Historical Monuments of Scotland in 1999. All of the material produced during Shearer's lifetime was catalogued in a five-year project, running from 1999 to 2004. This covers 14,400 drawings, and the manuscripts relating to those drawings. The Royal Commission also hold a number of personal papers, given to them by Shearer's family.

== Bibliography ==
- Fleetwood, David; et al. (2010). MacDowell, Dawn (ed.). Power to the People - the built heritage of Scotland's hydroelectric power. Historic Scotland. ISBN 978-1-84917-036-9.
- Fraser, Norrie, ed. (1956). Sir Edward MacColl - A maker of modern Scotland. Edinburgh: Stanley Press.
- McConnachie, Siobhan (2003). "James Shearer and the North of Scotland Hydro-Electric Board". Architectural Heritage. 14. Architectural Heritage Society of Scotland / Edinburgh University Press: 104–118. ISSN 1350-7524.
- Owen, Caroline (2003). "James Shearer and the Dunfermline Advisory Town Plan, 1946". Architectural Heritage. 14. Architectural Heritage Society of Scotland / Edinburgh University Press: 86–108. ISSN 1350-7524.
- Miller, James (2002). The Dam Builders - Power from the Glens. Birlinn. ISBN 978-1-84158-225-2.
- Payne, Peter L (1988). The Hydro. Aberdeen University Press. ISBN 978-0-08-036584-8.
- Wood, Emma (2002). The Hydro Boys. Luath Press. ISBN 978-1-84282-016-2.
