= Shira Hydro-Electric Scheme =

Power stations near Loch Fyne, Scotland

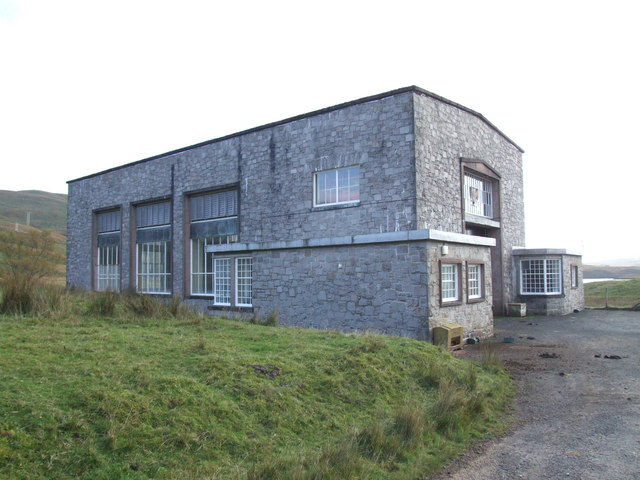
- Sron Mor power station

- Location within Argyll and Bute
- Country: Scotland
- Location: Glen Shira, Argyll and Bute
- Coordinates: 56.2776°N 4.9220°W
- Purpose: Power
- Status: Operational
- Opening date: 1955
- Owner: SSE

The Shira Hydro-Electric Scheme is a project initiated by the North of Scotland Hydro-Electric Board to use the waters of the River Shira, the River Fyne and other small streams to generate hydroelectricity. It is located between Loch Fyne and Loch Awe in Argyll and Bute, western Scotland. It consists of three power stations and three impounding dams.

The remoteness of the area in which the scheme was built required 15 miles (24 km) of access roads to be built before the main works could begin. The three dams were all of different types; a round headed buttress dam; a concrete gravity and earth fill dam; and the first ever use of a prestressed gravity dam. The construction of the earth fill dam was hindered by four months of extremely wet weather. Clachan was the first large underground power station that the Board built, while Sron Mor was the first implementation of a pumped storage scheme, built in anticipation of the arrival of nuclear power generation. The power stations were commissioned in 1953, 1955 and 1957, in advance of the completion of work on the dams.

== History ==
The North of Scotland Hydro-Electric Board was created by the Hydro-electric Development (Scotland) Act 1943, a measure championed by the politician Tom Johnston while he was Secretary of State for Scotland. Johnston's vision was for a public body that could build hydro-electric stations throughout the Highlands. Profits made by selling bulk electricity to the Scottish lowlands would be used to fund "the economic development and social improvement of the North of Scotland." Private consumers would be offered a supply of cheap electricity, and their connection to that supply would not reflect the actual cost of its provision in remote and sparsely populated areas.

The first two major schemes promoted by the Board had been at Loch Sloy and Tummel-Garry, but both had been the subject of fierce opposition on the grounds of amenity and fishing. The Shira scheme was close to the Sloy scheme but quite remote, and did not attract the same level of opposition. The Board surveyed the area in 1946, and installed a number of rain gauges, to provide accurate data on water resources. These showed that average rainfall would be about 105 inches (2,700 mm), but also showed that there were some periods when it was very heavy indeed. In addition, the terrain was quite challenging for a large construction project, and many miles of access roads were needed to enable vehicles to reach the construction sites.

Several of the Board's schemes were able to cascade power stations, so that water was used more than once, but for the Shira scheme there was only one suitable site for a storage reservoir. However, it also became clear that additional water could be obtained from adjacent river systems, to increase the amount of power that could be generated. The project became the Board's Construction Scheme No.12. When work began in 1949, the first task was the construction of around 15 miles (24 km) of access roads, which was a slow process, and no other work could be started until these were completed. A quarry was opened near to the dam, and quarrying machinery from the Loch Sloy project was adapted to produce rock sand. A base for 800 workmen was built on an abandoned military camp, and by Spring 1951, everything was in place for the main construction to begin.

=== Construction ===
A main dam was built across the River Shira to create Lochan Shira, and another dam creating a second much smaller reservoir called Lochan Sron Mor was built below it. At the main dam site, the rock strata was quite variable, and 135,000 cubic yards (103,000 m^{3}) of rock and soil were excavated before the foundations were put in. A round headed buttress dam was thought to be most suitable for the ground conditions after consideration of several other types. It was 2,379 feet (725 m) long and 148 feet (45 m) high. The second dam was built in two parts, either side of a large rock intrusion. One half was a concrete gravity dam, and the other an earth fill dam with a central spine of concrete. Construction proceeded well until mid-June 1954, when four months of extremely wet weather made working with earth fill almost impossible. By the end of December 1954, however, impounding began in the lower reservoir. Filling of the main reservoir began two years later, in December 1956, although construction of the dam was not completed until early 1959.

The tunnel from Lochan Sron Mor to Clachan power station, on the banks of Loch Fyne, was around 6 miles (9.7 km) long and 11 feet (3.4 m) in diameter. Half of it was completed in the first year. Costings for Clachan power station were similar for a surface building and an underground station, as there was a shortage of steel at the time, and the underground option saved 350 tons of it. This option was therefore adopted, and the cavern was created by cut-and-cover. Once the enormous machine hall had been excavated, a reinforced concrete arch roof was built over it, and rocks were used to return the ground surface to its original profile. This was the first large underground station that the Board built. The machine hall housed a single Francis turbine driving a 40 MW generator, the largest water-powered generator in the United Kingdom at the time. The power station was commissioned in January 1955.

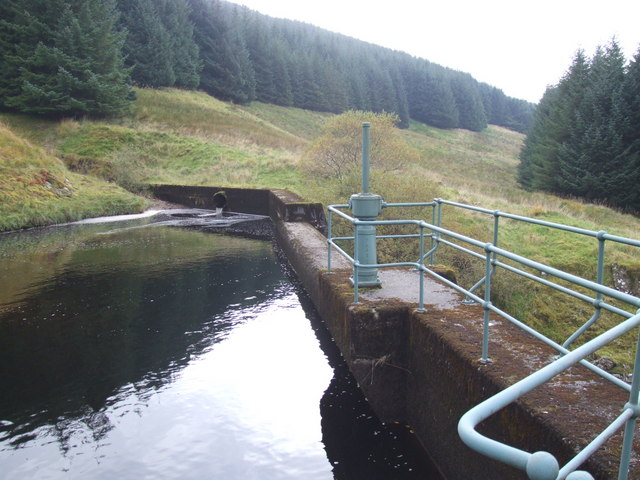
Water from the Brannie Burn is fed into the Clachan tunnel

The catchment area of Lochan Shira was increased by intercepting tributaries in the River Fyne catchment, one of which, the Allt an Taillir also received water from dams on the Allt Coire Làir, a tributary of the River Lochy that flows into Loch Awe. The catchment of the Lochan Sron Mor was increased by aqueducts from dams on tributaries of the Cladich River, while similar intakes on the Brannie, Kilbaan and Clachan fed water into the tunnel to Clachan power station. However, when the station was not generating, the water from these intakes flowed in the reverse direction and into Lochan Sron Mor. The lower reservoir was much too small for its catchment. To prevent the water going to waste, Sron Mor power station, which normally generated power when water passed from the upper to the lower reservoir, was fitted with pumps to move water from the lower to the upper reservoir. Edward MacColl, the Board's chief executive from inception until his death in 1951, had suggested a similar scheme for a power station at Sloy in 1936, while working for the Central Electricity Board. His idea, which he called a "reversible hydraulic station", was dismissed as uneconomic. Such a scheme is now called pumped storage and the Sron Mor station was the first major implementation of it in Britain. The Board were keen that data should be collected on its operation, in view of its potential benefits for systems which might soon include nuclear generating capacity. Sron Mor station began operating in Autumn 1957, around 18 months before the main dam and the final collecting aqueduct were completed.

=== Allt na Lairige ===
A site for a further reservoir was found in the valley of the Allt na Lairige, a tributary of the Fyne. Other streams could be diverted to increase the catchment area above the natural 3.2 square miles (8.3 km^{2}), where the rainfall was around 125 inches (3,200 mm) per year. By locating the power station on the banks of the River Fyne, a head of 800 feet (240 m) could be obtained, but the costs of the dam would make the scheme uneconomic. Engineers suggested that a prestressed concrete dam would be significantly cheaper than a mass gravity dam, but Angus Fulton who with Tom Lawrie had driven the Board forwards with energy and enthusiasm after MacColl's death, argued that a better solution was to spend the same amount of money on a prestressed dam, but build it 14 feet (4.3 m) higher. Despite the risks that this would be the first dam of its type in the world, Fulton thought it had "an element of adventure" and the Board agreed to proceed. The project became the Board's Construction Scheme No.27, and work started in 1953. Allt na Lairige Dam was 1,395 feet (425 m) long and 78 feet (24 m) high, while the tunnel from the dam to Allt na Lairige power station was 1.75 miles (2.82 km) long. There were some problems with getting the high tensile steel bars delivered on time, but the work progressed well, and was completed in Autumn 1956. The water powered two Pelton wheels connected to a central 6 MW alternator, and the dam was fitted with instrumentation so that data would be available to inform future designs, although the Board did not subsequently build another prestressed dam.

== Hydrology ==
The surface level of Lochan Shira is 1,109 feet (338 m) above Ordnance datum (AOD), it covers 0.483 square miles (1.25 km^{2}), and drains an area of 4.44 square miles (11.5 km^{2}). Lochan Sròn Mór is a lot smaller, covering 0.104 square miles (0.27 km^{2}), and its catchment area is 5.1 square miles (13.21 km^{2}). Its surface level is 974 feet (297 m) and it is this difference in levels that provides the head of 150 feet (46 m) for Sron Mor power station. Loch Fyne is a sea loch and a head of 964 feet (294 m) powers Clachan power station. Clachan discharges into the River Fyne above the point at which it enters Loch Fyne. This was the suggestion of the Fishery advisor, and required much more civil engineering than discharging into Loch Fyne. The intent was to encourage breeding fish to enter the river, rather than the tailrace of the power station.

The reservoir formed by the Allt na Lairige Dam is at 994 feet (303 m) AOD, has a surface area of 82 acres (33 ha) and drains an area of 3.17 square miles (8.2 km^{2}). This provides the head of 817 feet (249 m) for the power station.

== Bibliography ==
- Miller, James (2002). The dam builders: power from the glens. Birlinn. ISBN 978-1-84158-225-2.
- Payne, Peter L (1988). The hydro: a study of the development of the major hydro-electric schemes undertaken by the North of Scotland Hydro-Electric Board. Pergamon. ISBN 978-0-08-036584-8.
- Reeves, Julian, ed. (2018). Power from the Glens - 75th Anniversary edition. SSE. ISBN 978-1-5272-2500-8.
- Wood, Emma (2002). The Hydro Boys: Pioneers of Renewable Energy. Luath Press. ISBN 978-1-84282-016-2.
