= Loch Bad an Sgalaig =

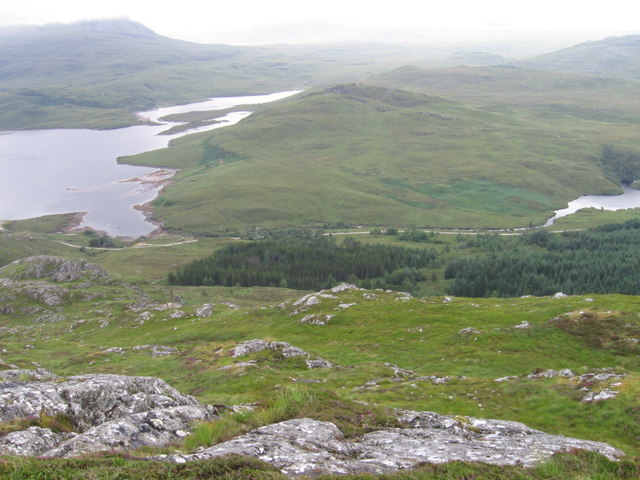
- From Meall Aundrary to Loch Bad an Sgalaig

- Location within Highland
- Location: Wester Ross, Scotland
- Coordinates: 57°40′32″N 5°36′33″W
- Type: freshwater loch and reservoir
- Primary inflows: Abhainn a' Gharbh Choire
- Basin countries: Scotland
- Max. length: 0.66 mi (1.06 km)
- Max. width: 0.5 mi (0.80 km)
- Surface area: 132.2 ha (327 acres)
- Average depth: 24.25 ft (7.39 m)
- Max. depth: 64 ft (20 m)
- Water volume: 151,000,000 ft^{3} (4,300,000 m^{3})
- Shore length^{1}: 10.2 km (6.3 mi)
- Surface elevation: 116 m (381 ft)
- ^{1} Shore length is not a well-defined measure.

Loch Bad an Sgalaig is a small, irregular shaped, freshwater loch and reservoir lying 5 mi (8.0 km) south of the village of Gairloch, in Wester Ross, Scotland.

The north west end of the loch, where it outflows to the Eas na Laimh stream, was dammed in 1949 to power the Kerry Falls hydroelectric power station.

The loch was surveyed on 30 July 1902 by T.N. Johnston and John Hewitt and later charted as part of the Sir John Murray's Bathymetrical Survey of Fresh-Water Lochs of Scotland 1897-1909.

== See also ==
- List of lochs in Scotland
