= North of Scotland Hydro-Electric Board =

UK hydroelectric government body (1943–1990)

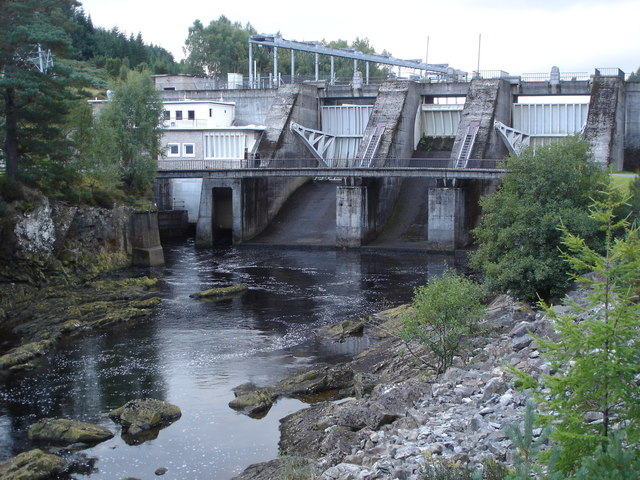
- The Dundreggan Dam was built in 1957 to supply water to Glenmoriston hydro-electric power station.
- Formerly: New establishment
- Type: Government body
- Industry: Electricity generation and supply
- Founded: 1943
- Founder: Act of Parliament: Hydro-Electric Development (Scotland) Act 1943
- Defunct: 1990
- Fate: Privatisation
- Successor: North of Scotland Electricity plc
- Headquarters: Edinburgh, Scotland
- Area served: North of Scotland
- Key people: Thomas Johnston (Chairman)
- Products: Electricity
- Production output: 7073 GWh (1989)
- Services: Generation and supply of electricity
- Net income: £15.741 million (1988)
- Total assets: Electricity generating stations and transmission system
- Owner: UK Government (Secretary of State for Scotland)
- Number of employees: 3917 (1989)
- Parent: UK Government
- Divisions: Distribution areas (see text)

The North of Scotland Hydro-Electric Board (1943–1990) was founded to design, construct and manage hydroelectricity projects in the Highlands of Scotland. It is regarded as one of the major achievements of Scottish politician Thomas Johnston, who chaired the board from 1945 to 1959.

== Background ==
In the 1930s several schemes were proposed to develop hydro-electric power in the north of Scotland. These met with opposition by landowners, sporting interest and the coal mining industry on the grounds of competition. There was also opposition from official sources. Plans to build a power station at Kinlochleven for the benefit of the aluminium industry were shelved when Inverness County Council refused to allow water from the River Spey and River Laggan to cross the county border into Argyllshire. In 1938, the Caledonian Water Power bill was defeated in Parliament. This would have allowed a private company to build hydro-electric schemes in the Highlands, and its defeat was welcomed by the Inverness Courier, whose editorial proclaimed:

The opponents of [the Bill] have been falsely represented as being opposed to the development of water power and the introduction of industry in every shape and form. Nothing could be further from the truth. What we ... maintain is that there shall be no further development of the water power resources of the Highlands until a Committee is set up by the Government to enquire into [how] ... these water resources should be developed for the benefit of the Highlands.

When World War II broke out, Tom Johnston, who had been a member of Parliament since the 1920s, was appointed as Regional Commissioner for Civil Defence for Scotland. In 1941, Winston Churchill, who was by then prime minister, having failed to convince Johnston to accept a post in London, asked him to be Secretary of State for Scotland. He agreed, providing that he could form a Council of State consisting of all five of the former secretaries of state who were still alive. If they could agree on an issue affecting Scotland, Johnston would look to Churchill to support the plan. He also did not want to receive any payment for the post, while the war lasted. Like the Inverness Courier, Johnston did not want private enterprise to be managing national resources, and had voted against the Caledonian Water Power bill in 1938. When another bill for a hydro-electric scheme in Glen Affric was put forward in September 1941, it was defeated, and Johnston announced that the government had its own plans for water power in the Highlands. In October, the Committee on Hydro-Electric Development in Scotland was set up, although it was generally known as the Cooper Committee, after its chairman Lord Cooper. Other members of the committee were William Douglas Weir, an engineer who had helped to plan Britain's national power grid in the 1920s; Neil Beaton, chairman of the Scottish Co-operative Wholesale Society; James Williamson, a civil engineer who had been involved with hydro-electric schemes in Galloway in the 1930s; and John A. Cameron of the Scottish Land Court.

Prior to the committee meeting, Cooper was sceptical of its aims, believing that most of the feasible hydro-electric schemes in Scotland had been explored by the Snell Committee, which met between 1918 and 1921. With the exception of the Glen Affric scheme and the West Highland scheme, both of which had failed to gain parliamentary approval, the only schemes left to pursue were small and unlikely to be viable. He initially dismissed the subsequent Hilleary Report as amateurish, but careful study of it convinced him that some action could be taken. Despite the wartime conditions, the committee devoted the first half of 1942 to researching existing documentation and consulting with a wide range of organisations, including the Central Electricity Board, the Electricity Commission, fishery boards, local authorities, estate owners and even the Royal Scottish Automobile Club. The committee published their report on 15 December 1942, and it was quite remarkable, not least for its clarity and lack of ambiguity. It was systematic, analytical and realistic, causing Johnson to tell the House of Commons that it was 'by common consent, a masterly production and a model of terse, constructive and courageous draftsmanship.' It argued that state policy had for over twenty years discouraged or prohibited private enterprise from developing the water resources of the Highlands, and had failed to produce its own strategy, resulting in deepening depression gripping the region. It suggested that the only realistic solution was a new public body called the North of Scotland Hydro-electric Board to initiate and develop schemes, including the distribution of power in areas where there was no existing supply network.

Johnson worked hard to ensure that the report would be well received. He talked to many people across the political spectrum, attempting to disarm potential opponents. Civil servants working for the Scottish Office also worked to understand potential opposition to the scheme, noting that the most likely group to oppose it would be the Coal Owners Association, who had a powerful influence in Parliament. By the time it was put before Parliament, Johnson had obtained cross party support from eight Cabinet ministers, including the Chancellor of the Exchequer, Sir Kingsley Wood. At its second reading in the House of Commons, Johnson stated that the bill was a 'partial remedy' for the malaise of the Highlands, which was 'rapidly bleeding to death' as a result of outward migration. He emphasised that surplus power would be sold to the national grid, to defray the costs of distribution in remote rural areas, and that the new board would be responsible for economic development and social improvement of large swathes of the Highlands. Despite the clear vision of the original report, large numbers of checks were added to the bill, requiring parliamentary approval at every stage of implementation, to the extent that James Henderson-Stewart of East Fife, who represented the Liberal National Party, moved an amendment to attempt to free the board from such bureaucratic interference, arguing that if Parliament was not going to trust the board to do its job, then they should not set it up in the first place. His amendment was later withdrawn when the Lord Advocate agreed to amend the bill at its committee stage, based on the objections raised during the debate.

Hydro-Electric Development (Scotland) Act 1943 (Note: Section 28.)
- Act of Parliament
- Parliament of the United Kingdom
- Long title: An Act to provide for the establishment of a Board for the development of supplies of electricity in the North of Scotland; to authorise the Board to generate and supply electricity and for purposes connected with the matters aforesaid.
- Citation: 6 & 7 Geo. 6. c. 32
- Territorial extent: United Kingdom

Dates
- Royal assent: 5 August 1943
- Commencement: 5 August 1943 (Note: The Acts of Parliament (Commencement) Act 1793.)
- Repealed: 31 March 1990 (Note: The Electricity Act 1989 (Commencement No. 2) Order 1990 (SI 1990/117).)

Other legislation
- Amended by: Electricity Act 1947; Electricity Act 1957; Statute Law (Repeals) Act 1978; Electricity (Scotland) Act 1979
- Repealed by: Electricity Act 1989

Status: Repealed

Text of statute as originally enacted

The bill was received enthusiastically in the House of Lords, where it was presented by Lord Alness. There was widespread support for the measures, and particular praise for Tom Johnson. Lord Airlie stated that speed was important, as residents were unlikely to remain content with the economic depression of the region for long. Finally, Lord Lovat appealed that when projects were implemented, they should use Scottish workers from the Highland Division when they returned from war, rather than Irish navvies. The necessary legal powers were granted by the Hydro-Electric Development (Scotland) Act 1943 (6 & 7 Geo. 6. c. 32), which was passed on 5 August 1943.

== Constitution ==
In September 1943, the names of the five board members were announced. Four were jointly appointed by the Secretary of State for Scotland and the Minister of Fuel and Power. The fifth was a nominee of the Central Electricity Board, and a member of that board. The chairman was to be David Ogilvy, the Earl of Airlie. He had worked with Johnson when they had been in charge of civil defence, and had initially been critical of the 1943 act because its scope was too limited. The deputy chairman and chief executive was Edward MacColl, an engineer with wide experience of hydro-electric projects and electrical distribution networks. His was the only full-time post. Neil Beaton had previously been a member of the Cooper Committee, Hugh Mackenzie was the Provost of Inverness, and the final member was the Central Electricity Board nominee, Walter Whigham, who was also a director of the Bank of England. Ill health led to him being replaced by the engineer Sir Duncan Watson soon afterwards.

Shortly after the conception of the board, Major Gwilym Lloyd George, the Minister for Fuel and Power, led a committee which considered how electricity supply could be rationalised in Britain. Johnson argued that his proposals would destroy the principles of the 1943 act, and eventually ensured that the Hydro-Electric Board was excluded from them. Some initial work under the act was carried out by civil servants, but the board took office in January 1944, and moved into a permanent office in Rothesay Terrace, Edinburgh a few weeks later. MacColl knew how to build up new organisations, and assembled a group of enthusiastic engineers around him, all of whom were relatively young. It was a fairly small team, and they were always over-worked. MacColl then invited five engineers, drawn from major engineering consultancies, to consider how the aims of the act could be implemented. This constituted the Panel of Technical Advisers, and they became an important and permanent part of the board's activities for fifteen years.

The headquarters of the board in Rothesay Terrace, Edinburgh were located outside the board's operating area. The 1943 act specified the management board was to comprise a chairman and not less than four and not more than eight members. The board in 1958 comprised Thomas Johnston (chairman), Sir Hugh Mackenzie (deputy chairman), Sir John Erskine, Sir George McGlashan, A. I. Mackenzie, A. Macrae, I. A. Duncan Millar, William Hughes, and John Jardine.

When the UK electricity supply industry was nationalised in 1948, the board took over the assets of the Grampian Electricity Supply Company and other bodies producing electricity in the northern part of Scotland, these were: Campbeltown and Mid-Argyll, Crieff, Dunoon and District, Loch Leven, North of Scotland, Peterhead, Stornoway, Thurso and District, Dundee, Aberdeen, Perth, Inverness, Buckie, Lossiemouth, Branderburgh and Oban corporations.

== Activity ==
One of the first responsibilities was to produce a development scheme. This would detail the available water resources in their area of operation, which had the potential to later become 'constructional schemes'. MacColl pressed on at breakneck speed, and within three months they had a list of 102 sites with potential for development. These ranged in size from small, such as one utilising Loch nan Gillean (Plockton) and streams, with a capacity of four million units (kilowatt-hours per year) to huge schemes such as that at Glen Affric, with a capacity of 440 million units. The capacity of all the schemes combined was estimated to be 6,274 million units, which was considerably more than the 4,000 million units suggested by the Cooper Committee. MacColl wanted to ensure that no scheme could later be rejected because it had not been included in the development scheme. Guthrie Brown, one of the panel of technical advisers, later wrote of his amazement at MacColl's detailed knowledge of so vast an area and its potential for water power.

While Johnston was still fighting the political battle to save the board from Lloyd George's reorganisations, MacColl wanted to begin building a scheme to demonstrate the effectiveness of the board. He chose Loch Sloy as the first constructional scheme. The loch had been the proposed site of a 360 MegaWatt pumped storage scheme in 1935, which had been rejected by Parliament, and the new scheme was for a conventional hydro-electric station with a lower capacity of 130 MW. The plans included two smaller projects, at Loch Morar and Kyle of Lochalsh, which were probably included to demonstrate the board's commitment to providing power to remote communities, even though on their own these two projects would not have been economically viable. Despite approval by the Amenity Committee, the Fishery Committee and the Electricity Commissioners, the Loch Sloy scheme was opposed by several county councils and some private individuals, raising the same issues that had prevented development of hydro-electric power in the Highlands for many years. An inquiry, chaired by John Cameron KC, was held in Edinburgh, which lasted for six days. The board had done themselves no favours by moving the site of the dam after the original plans were published, but Cameron was sympathetic to their cause, and handled attempts to scuttle the plans skillfully. Some of the county councils withdrew their opposition during the hearing, but Dumbarton Council persisted with their claim that they needed Loch Sloy for domestic water supply. Cameron decided that their development plans were too optimistic to be achievable, and ruled that the scheme was in the public interest. He stated that the Secretary of State should approve the scheme, and Tom Johnston as Secretary of State did so. No further objections were received while it was before Parliament, and the Loch Sloy scheme was authorised on 28 March 1945.

The second constructional scheme was the Tummel–Garry scheme, which included a much smaller project for a power station at Kerry Falls near Gairloch. The main scheme would involve the construction of three dams, the first near Trinafour to create Loch Errochty along the course of a stream called Errochty Water, a tributary of the River Garry. This would feed a power station near the head of Loch Tummel. The second dam would be built across the River Tummel upstream of the Falls of Tummel, and would feed Clunie power station, located below the falls. The level of Loch Tummel would be 17 feet (5.2 m) higher. The third dam was to be built across the Tummel above Pitlochry, which would supply compensation water to maintain the flow in the river downstream as well as generating power. The Hydro-Electric Board were unsure whether to proceed at the time, because of the opposition to their previous scheme, but MacColl was adamant that they should fight to ensure the principles of the original act of Parliament were not eroded. The Central Electricity Board and the Electricity Commissioners approved the scheme on 7 February 1945, but the Amenity Committee and the Fisheries Committee both wanted parts of it omitted. When it was published by the Secretary of State, there were 25 formal objections, with Perthshire County Council, riparian owners and the residents of Pitlochry leading the opposition.

Johnston decided that a tribunal was necessary to consider the objections, and John Cameron was joined by Sir Robert Bryce Walker and Major G. H. M. Brown Lindsay. It began on 25 May 1945 and lasted for ten days, with the transcript of the proceedings running to 1,188 pages. MacColl was unable to speak, as he was ill, and Lord Airlie was savaged by those opposing the scheme. In desperation, he asked the question, "Do the people of this country want electricity or do they not?" Lord Airlie recovered his composure for the second day of the hearing, and was followed by technical experts, including Thomas Lawrie, who spoke in place of MacColl, and J. Guthrie Brown, who spoke eloquently on every aspect of the civil engineering works. The objectors had their say from the end of day six onwards, and predicted that the amenities of the area would be destroyed by the scheme. It also became clear on day nine that a number of riparian owners had donated waterfalls to the National Trust for Scotland, to make the board's job more difficult. The final report acknowledged the serious objections to the scheme, and examined them against the public interest. It stated that the scheme must stand or fall as a whole, and that despite some possible damage to amenities, the project should proceed.

Following the decision of the tribunal, an order to confirm the scheme was placed before Parliament, but unlike previous schemes, there were attempts to annul the order. William Snadden, the member for Perth and Kinross lead the attack, claiming that "the beauty of the heart of Scotland will be forever broken." All of the issues that had been aired at the tribunal were raised again, and there were savage attacks on both the board and on Lord Airlie. There were however supporters for the scheme, and Colonel Errol, the member for Althincham and Sale, was particularly lucid as he proclaimed that the Scottish Lowlands and England were going to pay for cheap power for the Highlands. He also wondered whether those who would no longer visit the River Tummel might be outnumbered by those who came to see the engineering works, and he reminded the house that everyone connected with the scheme was Scottish. When a vote was taken, annulment of the order was rejected by 248 votes to 63. Lord Kinnaird was persuaded not to introduce a similar motion to annul the order in the House of Lords, and so the Tummel–Garry scheme was authorised on 19 November 1945. However, Lord Kinnaird introduced a debate on the operation of the Hydro-Electric Development (Scotland) Act 1943, at which Lord Airlie was able to put the case for the Tummel–Garry scheme and to explain the way in which the board operated. There were some who felt that there was no need for hydro-electric power at all, because it would soon be superseded by atomic power. In summary, Lord Westwood, the leader of the house, spoke in favour of the board and Lord Kinnaird's motion was rejected, allowing the board to continue. Lord Westwood also stated during the debate that all objections to the Fannich scheme, on the River Conon in Ross-shire, had been withdrawn, and the scheme would therefore proceed.

== Power generation ==
The board's generating capacity was mainly provided by the construction of "schemes" of linked hydro-electric stations, with multiple generators located across one or more catchment area. There were also steam driven and diesel engine driven power stations. When the board was first constituted it owned only two power stations: the oil-fired stations at Kirkwall on Orkney and Rothesay on the Isle of Bute.

=== Hydro-electric power stations ===
The following hydro-electric stations were operational prior to nationalisation. Some were transferred to the South of Scotland Board.

Hydro-electric stations operational in 1946
Station	Owner	Capacity kW	Commissioned	Output (1946) MWh
Maxwell Town	Dumfries Corporation	87		220.6
Loch Luichart	Grampian Electricity Supply Co	2035	1926	13,219
Rannoch	Grampian Electricity Supply Co	44,520	1930	157,273
Tummel	Grampian Electricity Supply Co	23,950	1933	113,081
Glebe	Greenoch Corporation	3382		635.2
Bught	Inverness Corporation	98		680.7
Inshes	Inverness Corporation	26		159.6
Lochaber	Lochaber Power Co	55,950	1929	455,385
Tobermory	Tobermory Corporation	37	1927	60.3

The principal schemes constructed by the board were:

- Affric-Beauly
- Awe (often grouped as Sloy/Awe)
- Breadalbane
- Conon
- Foyers
- Great Glen or Garry–Moriston
- Shin
- Shira (often grouped with Sloy/Awe)
- Sloy (often grouped as Sloy/Awe)
- Tummel Valley

In 1958 the following hydro-electric stations were in operation:

Hydro-electric stations (1958 and 1968)
Station	Scheme No.	Capacity MW	Water head feet	Commissioned	Output (1958) GWh	Output (1968) GWh
Sloy	1	130	910	1957	104.88	120
Nostie Bridge (Lochalsh)	1	1.25	490	1947	4.607	6
Morar	1	0.75	16	1948	2.422	3
Pitlochry	2	15	50	1950	52.948	55
Clunie	2	61.2	173	1950	147.398	165
Grudie Bridge (Fannich)	3	24	550	1950	99.487	82
Kerry Falls (Gairloch)	2	1.25	185	1952	2.801	5
Striven (Cowal)	4 and 69	6	403	1951	17.84	19
Fasnakyle (Affric)	7	66	522	1951	209.437	223
Lussa	8 and 68	2.4	380	1952	8.837	10
Shira	12	40	965	1955	45.826	74
Storr Lochs (Skye)	13	2.85	447	1952	5.871	7
Tummel Bridge	Grampian	34	173	1933	55.023	120
Rannoch	Grampian	48	512	1930	150.174	174
Gaur	15	6.4	92	1953	15.93	17
Luichart	16	24	185	1954	114.743	124
Torr Achilty	16	15	52	1954	29.838	36
Loch Dubh (Ullapool)	20	1.2	543	1954	4.299	5
Errochty	2	75	610	1955	80.2.2	84
Mullardoch Tunnel	7	2.4	1956	1956	6.92	8
Finlarig (Lawers)	18	30	1362	1956	53.747	80
Quoich	24	22	320	1955	90.252	77
Achanalt		2.4	65	1956	6.99	8
Invergarry	23	20	175	1956	72.017	82
Ceannacroc	23	20	296	1956	58.086	73
Allt na Lairige	27	6	817	1956	14.444	
Kilmelfort	21	2	365	1956	9.19	9
Small compensation water stations		0.675				

Hydro-electric power stations under construction in 1958 were:

Hydro-electric stations under construction 1958 (output in 1968)
Station		Capacity MW	Output (1968) GWh
Sron Mor (Shira)		5	6
Mossford		24	112
Glenmoriston		32	114
Breadalbane (Killin section)	Lochay	47	160
Breadalbane (Killin section)	Lubreoch	4	13
Breadalbane (Killin section)	Cashlie	11	25
Breadalbane (St Fillans section)	St Fillans	21	76
Breadalbane (St Fillans section)	Dalchonzie	4	18
Breadalbane (St Fillans section)	Lednoch	3	5
Lairg		3.5	10
Shin		24	103
Cassley		10	24
Orrin		18	76
Small compensation water stations		3.7	

The following additional hydro-electric stations were commissioned in the 1960s.

Hydro-electric stations commissioned in the 1960s
Power station	Scheme No.	Commissioned	Head of water m	Catchment km^{3}	Capacity MW	Annual output GWh
Loch Ericht	31	1962	55	89	2.2	11
Kilmorack	30	1962	17	906	20	55
Aigas	30	1962	18	780	20	55
Culligran	30	1962	60	290	24	57
Deanie	30	1963	113	212	38	94
Livishie	23A	1962	259	41	15	24
Inverawe	28	1963	36	839	25	100
Nant	28	1963	172	44	15	27
Chliostair	35	1960	122	8	1	2.4
Gisla	34	1960	47	16	0.54	2
Loch Gair	71	1961	109	62	6	18
Mucomir	26	1962	7	383	1.95	9

By 1968 the installed capacity of all conventional hydro-electric power stations operated by North of Scotland Board was 1047.06 MW, and the total average annual output was 2911.4 GWh.

==== Cruachan pumped storage scheme ====
The Cruachan power station (also known as the Cruachan Dam) is a pumped-storage hydroelectric power station commissioned in 1965. It can provide 440 MW of power and has a capacity of 7.1 GWh.

=== Steam power stations ===
There were two steam power stations in 1958.

Steam power stations
Station	Steam raising, lb/hr	Generating sets	Maximum demand, MW	Electricity generated, GWh
Aberdeen (Ferryhill)	604,000	2 × 5 MW, 2 × 12.5 MW, 1 × 15 MW, 1 × 6.25 MW, 1 × 1 MW	53.1	65.906
Dundee (Carolina Port)	812,000	1 × 15.625 MW, 2 × 30 MW,	76.8	228.655

=== Diesel engine stations ===
There were nine diesel fuelled power stations in 1958.

Diesel engine stations
Station	Engines	Power output MW	Maximum demand MW	Total electrical energy generated 1958 GWh
Bowmore	3 × 0.6 MW, 2 × 0.265 MW	2.33	1.38	4.978
Brodick	1 × 0.88 MW, 1 × 0.685 MW, 1 × 0.6 MW, 1 × 0.425 MW, (1 × 0.135 MW water driven)	3.087	2.18	5.725
Campbeltown	1 × 1 MW, 2 × 0.6 MW, 2 × 0.4 MW 2 × 0.37 MW	3.74	2.71	3.332
Daliburgh	1 × 0.46 MW, 2 × 0.45 MW, 1 × 0.2 MW	1.56	0.730	2.798
Kirkwall	4 × 1 MW, 1 × 0.52 MW, 2 × 2 MW	8.52	4.48	14.807
LerwIck	2 × 2 MW, 3 × 1 MW, 1 × 0.6 MW	7.6	3.985	12.894
Lochalsh	1 × 0.375 MW, 1 × 0.135 MW, 2 × 0.2 MW	0.91	0.59	0.059
Stornoway	2 × 2.04 MW, 1 × 2.0 MW, 3 × 1.0 MW	9.08	5.55	18.963
Tobermory	1 × 0.45 MW, 1 × 0.425 MW, 1 × 0.274 MW, 3 × 0.075 MW	1.375	0.47	1.486

== Transmission ==
The supply of electricity was through the Highland Grid operating at 132 kV. In 1958 this comprised 1,630 circuit miles with 31 substations. The total length of all mains was 17,369 circuit miles. By April 1989 there were 1,053 miles (1,694 km) of 275 kV lines; 2,115 miles (3,403 km) of 132 kV lines; and 27,550 miles (44,340 km) of lines operating at less than 132 kV.

== Distribution area ==
Supply to customers was through 13 distribution areas. The areas' supply capacity and key data for 1956 were as follows:

North of Scotland Hydro-electric Board Distribution areas
Distribution area	Supply (generating) capacity MW	Max. load MW	Total electricity sold 1956 GWh	Consumers
Aberdeen	57.25	72.7	238.752	74,479
Cowal	2.952; 6.0 (hydro-electric)	10.56	36.65	15,308
Dalriada	3.14; 2.4 (hydro-electric)	6.658	23.953	7,451
Dundee	45.625	80.97	277.295	66,086
Lewis	7.68	4.73	13.079	7,285
Lochaber	3.5; 0.75 (hydro-electric)	3.66	12.735	3,628
Lorne and the Isles	1.56; 2.0 (hydro-electric)	6.36	21.893	5,539
North Caledonia	0.12 (hydro-electric)	70.889	210.655	63,289
Orkney	5.04	3.93	11.408	5,123
Perth (city)	Electricity imported	13.647	3181	13,725
Shetland	6.2	3.465	9.756	4,651
Skye and Lochalsh	0.91; 2.85 (hydro-electric)	2.5	7.81	4,121
South Caledonia	75 + 30 + 6.4 +15 + 48 + 34 (hydro-electric)	70.193	226.956	57,050

== Operating data 1949 to 1989 ==
Key operating data for the North of Scotland Hydro-Electric Board is summarised in the table.

Key operating data for the North of Scotland Hydro-Electric Board
Year	Total installed generating capacity, MW	Maximum demand MW	Customers Thousands	Employees	Capital expenditure £ million	Net profit £ million
1949	251	216	222	2453	13.4	0.097
1959	1047	861	384	3038	13.0	–0.029
1969	1815	992	454	3860	7.8	–1.399
1971	1830	1045	473	3832	11.3	0.093
1972	1821	1289	482	3641	14.4	–3.207
1973	1832	1339	488	3588	16.1	–2.474
1974	2150	1456	477	3673	16.9	–2.725
1975	2150	1498	486	3745	32.2	–2.274
1976	2160	1486	498	3808	70.1	0.103
1977	2176	1614	510	3796	77.2	5.888
1978	2109	1576	520	3910	63.5	1.794
1979	2116	1691	528	4059	47.6	2.065
1980	2116	1695	536	4146	42.7	2.473
1981	2125	1637	543	4115	41.5	11.214
1982	2551	1740	549	4005	32.5	13.217
1983	3173	1443	556	3920	41.9	18.358
1984	3179	1495	563	3840	38.9	12.191
1985	3259	1552	571	3830	38.3	–6.075
1986	3259	1502	578	3767	44.5	5.930
1987	3262	1660	585	3795	54.7	17.298
1988	3265	1486	590	3861	54.0	15.741
1989	3265	1419	597	3917	38.3	0.584

Electricity supplied by the board, in GWh

== Dissolution ==
North of Scotland Electricity plc was formed in 1989 to acquire the board's assets ahead of privatisation, however the name was later changed to Scottish Hydro-Electric plc. The board was dissolved in March 1990 and privatised in June 1991. The company's head office was moved from Edinburgh to Perth.

A further name change to Scottish and Southern Energy plc was made in December 1998 after the merger with Southern Electric plc. The brand name "Scottish Hydro-Electric" continues to be used for the company's Scottish business.

== See also ==
- Energy policy of the United Kingdom
- Energy use and conservation in the United Kingdom
- South of Scotland Electricity Board

== Bibliography ==
- Electrical Journal (1958). Electricity undertakings of the world. London: Benn Brothers.
- Garrett, Frederick (1959). Garcke's Manual of Electricity Supply vol.56. London: Electrical Press.
- Miller, James (2002). The Dam Builders - Power from the Glens. Birlinn. ISBN 978-1-84158-225-2.
- Payne, Peter L (1988). The Hydro. Aberdeen University Press. ISBN 978-0-08-036584-8.
- Wood, Emma (2002). The Hydro Boys. Luath Press. ISBN 978-1-84282-016-2.
