= Kilmelford =

Coordinates: 56°15′54″N 5°28′49″W

Kilmelford: Scottish Gaelic: Cill Mheallaird
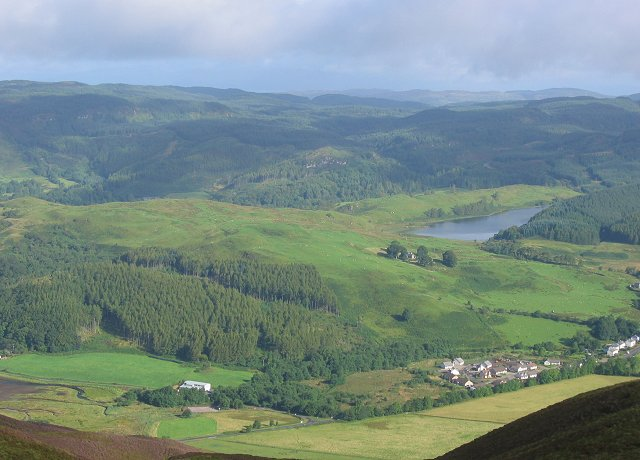
- Looking to Kilmelford from Ceann Mòr (119 m)

- Location within Argyll and Bute
- OS grid reference: NM845125
- Council area: Argyll and Bute
- Lieutenancy area: Argyll and Bute
- Country: Scotland
- Sovereign state: United Kingdom
- Post town: OBAN
- Postcode district: PA34
- Dialling code: 01852
- Police: Scotland
- Fire: Scottish
- Ambulance: Scottish
- UK Parliament: Argyll, Bute and South Lochaber
- Scottish Parliament: Argyll and Bute

Kilmelford (Scottish Gaelic: Cill Mheallaird) is a village in Argyll and Bute, Scotland.

It is situated near the head of the west coast sea loch, Loch Melfort, on the A816 Lochgilphead to Oban road about 15 miles (24 km) south of Oban.

== Points of interest ==
- An Sithean (Kilmelford Cave)
- Arduaine Gardens
- Clachan Bridge, the Bridge over the Atlantic
- The Cuilfail Hotel
- Boaby The Policeman's Garden of Remembrance
- Kilmartin Glen prehistoric sites
- Kilmelford Church
- Slate Islands, including Easdale Island Folk Museum
