= Scottish Hydro Electric =

UK electricity supplier (1989–1998)

Scottish Hydro-Electric plc
- Formerly: North of Scotland Electricity plc
- Type: Public
- Predecessor: North of Scotland Hydro-Electric Board
- Incorporated: Scotland
- Founded: 1 April 1989; 37 years ago
- Defunct: 14 December 1998; 27 years ago
- Fate: Merged with Southern Electric plc
- Successor: Scottish and Southern Energy (now SSE plc)
- Headquarters: Perth, Scotland, UK
- Products: Gas and Electricity
- Website: www.hydro.co.uk

Scottish Hydro-Electric (named North of Scotland Electricity between 1 April 1989 and 1 August 1989) was a public electricity supplier in the United Kingdom. It was listed on the London Stock Exchange and was once a constituent of the FTSE 100 Index. The company merged with Southern Electric in 1998, and is now known as SSE plc.

== History ==
The company was formed on 1 April 1989 to acquire the assets of the North of Scotland Hydro-Electric Board ahead of electricity privatisation in the United Kingdom under the name North of Scotland Electricity plc. The company was floated on the London Stock Exchange in June 1991. It merged with the English public electricity supplier Southern Electric plc to become Scottish and Southern Energy plc (SSE) on 14 December 1998.

== Operations ==
The Scottish Hydro name was used as a brand name by SSE plc for supplying gas and electricity in Scotland, and by Scottish Hydro-Electric Power Distribution Ltd, the distribution network operator in the north of Scotland. In 2011, power consumption of the north was largely handled by Scottish Hydro.

== Successors ==
Post-merger logo

The Scottish Hydro brand continued in use for a time after the 1998 merger but SSE later used its own brand throughout the UK. Following the purchase of SSE's retail business by OVO Energy in 2020, the Scottish Hydro brand became a trading name of OVO Electricity Limited until it was replaced by the Ovo brand.

== Fuel sources ==
The fuel sources used by SSE Energy Supply to generate power during the year 2015-16 and 2021-22 were as follows:

Fuel	2015-16		2021-22	
Fuel	% of total	GB average (for comparison)	% of total	GB average (for comparison)
Coal	25%	17%	0%	3.8%
Natural Gas	35%	32%	70.1%	38.5%
Nuclear	7%	24%	0%	16.1%
Sun, wind, water	29%	24%	29.9%	38.7%
Other	4%	3%	0%	2.9%
Total	100%	100%	100%	100%
