= Edward MacColl =

Scottish engineer (1882–1951)

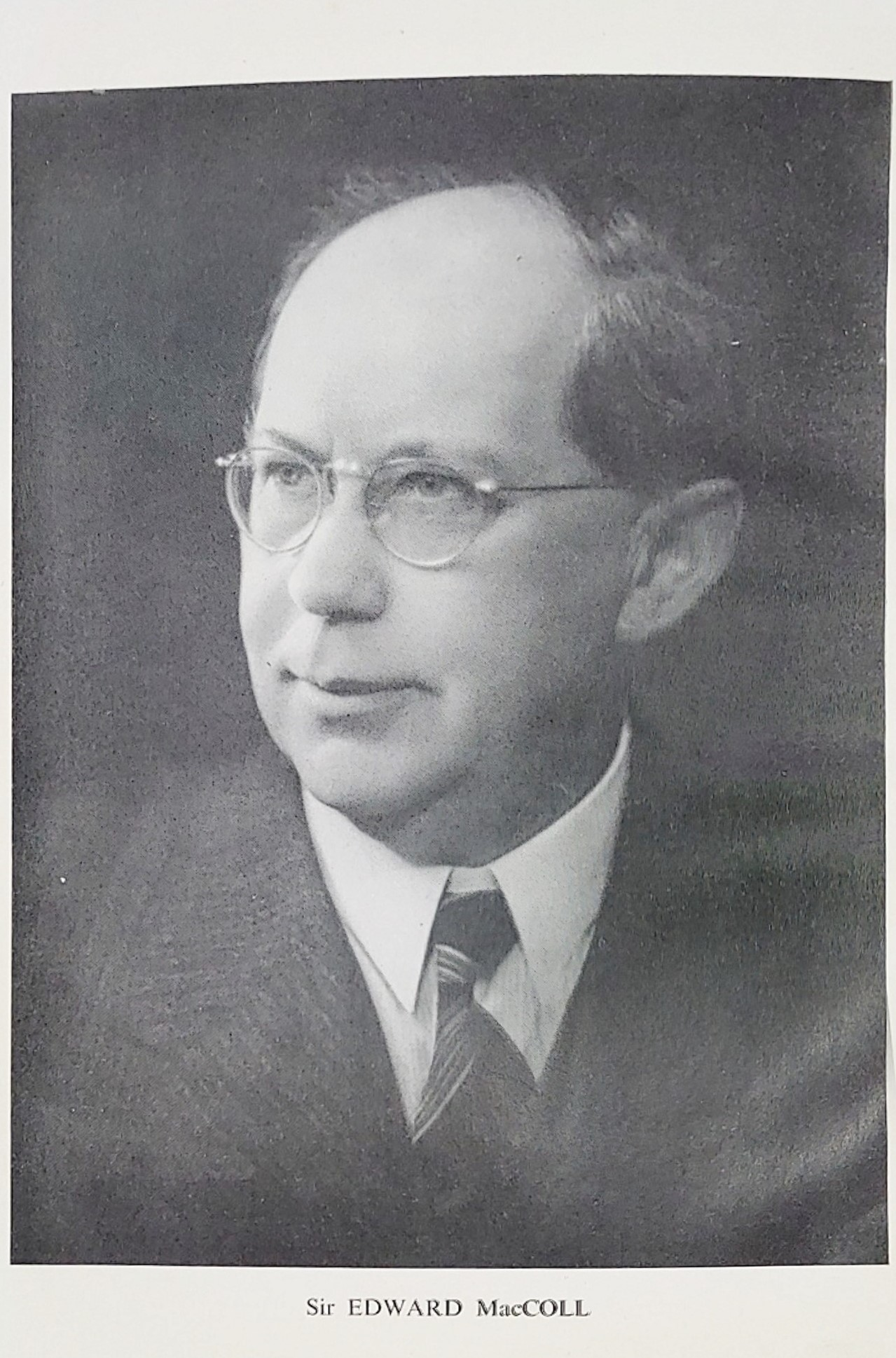
- Sir Edward MacColl
- Born: 8 July 1882; Dumbarton, Dunbartonshire, Scotland
- Died: 15 July 1951 (aged 69); Edinburgh
- Occupation: Engineer
- Spouse: Margaret Donald
- Children: 2 (Alastair, Sheila)

Edward MacColl (8 July 1882 - 15 July 1951), later Sir Edward MacColl, was a Scottish engineer, whose greatest achievements were made during the time he was Vice Chairman and chief executive officer for the North of Scotland Hydro-Electric Board. He was knighted in 1949, and died on 15 July 1951, the day before his wife Lady Margaret MacColl was due to perform the formal opening of the Tummel hydro-electric power scheme.

== Early life ==
Edward MacColl, actually Albert Edward MacColl, was born on 8 July 1882 in Dumbarton, Dunbartonshire. His mother was English and his father was John MacColl, originally from Kilmelford in Argyll, Scotland. John MacColl died while Edward was still a child, and so the family moved in with his mother's parents. His grandfather was Albert Edward Johnson, who was employed by Denny's shipyard to make models of the ships which would then be built in the yard, and MacColl spent a lot of time in his grandfather's workshop, learning to appreciate craftsmanship. His mother taught music to generate some income, and he picked up a love of music from her. He was formally educated at a school for Scottish Episcopalians. Both of his grandparents died on the same day during the flu epidemic of 1895, at which point his mother married a building contractor named William Barlas. That event marked the end of his formal education.

As his step-father was not prepared to fund his higher education, he began serving an apprenticeship in 1896, working for the shipbuilders John Brown and Company, of Clydebank. Despite working for 12 hours each day, he managed to find time to attend classes at Glasgow Technical College, and subsequently at Glasgow University. He also found time to attend concerts when he could afford to. Conditions in the shipyard were harsh, and in 1901 he was dismissed for bad timekeeping.

== Career ==
He obtained a job in 1902 working for Glasgow Corporation, in the Tramways Department. The horse-drawn system was electrified in 1901, and MacColl was initially a substation chargeman, but his manager soon realised that he showed promise, and he moved first to the Test Room and then to Pinkstone Power Station. He became well known for his expertise, and in 1918 was recruited by the Clyde Valley Electric Power Company, becoming their Chief Technical Engineer.

His new employer was the largest of its type in Scotland, generating and distributing electric power from coal-fired power stations at Yoker, Clyde's Mill and Motherwell. Their next project was the development of a hydro-electric station at the Falls of Clyde, the finance and promotion of which was by the Power and Traction Finance Company of London. MacColl worked on the details of the scheme, fostering good relationships with all of the landowners likely to be affected by the proposal. He also considered the questions of amenity, for a power station to be built in a popular beauty spot. He decided that a run-of-river system, which did not need a dam or reservoir, would be suitable for the location, and ensured that the buildings would blend into the countryside. He was also careful to make sure that there would be adequate compensation water flowing over the Falls of Clyde, so that they would remain a tourist attraction. It was this attention to detail that ensured permission was granted by Parliament to proceed with the scheme, and that Scotland's first hydro-electric scheme designed for public supply, rather than to serve industry, was a success, despite opposition from many who felt that coal-fired stations were the only way to generate electricity.

Having gained a knowledge of hydro-electric stations, his next post would enable him to work on an electricity distribution system. In 1927, he moved to the Central Electricity Board, newly formed following the deliberations of the Weir Committee. Here he worked on long-distance transmission lines, defining the technical specifications for such a system, and inventing the MacColl Protective System, which would subsequently be used worldwide wherever transmission lines needed to be controlled. At the time, there were no national standards for the frequency of alternating current supplies, meaning that they could not be connected together, but he decided that all systems should provide power at 50 Hertz, and by 1933 had created Scotland's National Grid. This was the first regional distribution grid in Britain, and served as the prototype for the rest of the National Grid.

During this early part of his career with the Central Electricity Board, he had negotiated with the Grampian Electricity Supply Company, which had resulted in the Board buying electricity in bulk produced by the Grampian's hydro-electric stations, for distribution over the new grid. In 1936, he worked on planning for another hydro-electric scheme, that at Loch Sloy, to the west of Loch Lomond. Here he conceived the idea of a pumped storage system, which he called a "reversible hydraulic station". It would use surplus electricity to pump water from Loch Lomond to Loch Sloy when demand was low, typically at night, and would use that water to generate electricity when demand was high. With eight turbines producing a total of 360 MW, it would have been much bigger than any of the existing Scottish hydro-electric schemes. The Technical Development Committee visited the site in 1937, and called for a scaled-down scheme, where dams and aqueducts would be used to significantly increase the catchment area of Loch Sloy, enabling the number of pumps to be reduced to four, but even this was deemed to be uneconomic, and MacColl was told to abandon it. He was beginning to realise that his sort of creative innovation was not what the Central Electricity Board was looking for.

In his spare time, MacColl worked on a survey of potential hydro-electric schemes for the Hilleary Committee. He collaborated with J Henderson on the water resources of the Highlands, and with James Williamson on how they could be used for the generation and transmission of power. His report reflected his attention to detail, with pages of statistics, maps and figures, but it was dismissed by the Central Electricity Board. When the committee's report was published in 1938, his work had been rewritten and most of the statistics removed, to the extent that Lord Cooper had called it "amateurish" when reviewing it for the Cooper Report of 1942. MacColl gave evidence to the Cooper Committee, particularly on how a bill for the development of hydro-electric power in Scotland should be structured, and how the Board to oversee the work should operate. The final report recommended the creation of the North of Scotland Hydro-Electric Board, and was welcomed by Evan Barron, editor of the Inverness Courier, as the culmination of 25 years of campaigning for the water resources of the Highlands to be used for the benefit of those who lived there.

=== North of Scotland Hydro-Electric Board ===
The Cooper Report resulted in the Hydro-Electric Development (Scotland) Act 1943 being introduced by Parliament, which created the new Board. Lord Airlie was to be its chairman, with MacColl as vice-chairman and chief executive. Of the other three members of the Board, two were appointed by the Secretary of State for Scotland Tom Johnston, working with the Minister of Fuel and Power, and one by the Central Electricity Board. All of the posts except MacColls were part time.

A plaque at Pitlochry Power Station commemorates Edward MacColl.

MacColl started working for the new Board in January 1944, and used his expertise at creating new organisations by recruiting a small team of enthusiastic young engineers. Angus Fenton became the chief civil and hydraulic engineer, and like MacColl, was fanatical about hydro-electric power and was a driver of men. W Guthrie became the chief electrical engineer, while David Fenton was the commercial engineer. A N Ferrier became the chief accountant, and the final engineer was Thomas Lawrie, who was released from the Royal Navy to become the secretary. All of them were passionate about harnessing the natural resources of the Highlands and ensuring that the Board succeeded in its aims of commercial success and delivering electricity to the people of the Highlands. With hindsight, the team was perhaps a little small for the amount of work that would be expected of them. Before he took up office, MacColl had asked five senior consulting engineers to meet him in Edinburgh to discuss the best way forward for the fledgling Board. They would become his Panel of Technical Advisors. Those with civil engineering expertise were William Halcrow, James Williamson, with whom he had worked on his submission to the Hilleary Committee, and J Guthrie Brown of Sir Alexander Gibb & Partners. The final two, with electrical and mechanical expertise, were J R Beard of Merz & McLellan and S B Donkin of Kennedy & Donkin. Rather than advising on an occasional basis, MacColl ensured that they became a permanent feature of the Board's operation for the next 15 years.

The Panel of Technical Advisers met in October 1943, and quickly realised that MacColl's intention was to be generating electricity much sooner than anyone imagined. The first requirement of the new legislation was to produce a Development Scheme, showing the possible water resources available. Having previously produced his report for the Hilleary Committee, MacColl listed 102 sites that might be suitable, and completed the task in only three months. It seems that MacColl included every possible site, to ensure that they would not wish to develop a site in the future and face objections that it had not appeared in the Development Scheme. The total amount of power they could produce was estimated at 6,274 million units, which far exceeded any previous estimates for the Scottish Highlands. Guthrie Brown would later write that he was amazed by MacColl's "detailed knowledge ... of the various areas and their value for water power development. It seemed as if he had walked over all the areas himself and assessed their potentialities..."

With MacColl's intimate knowledge of Loch Sloy from his earlier attempts to build a pumped storage scheme there, it seemed like a good choice for the Board's first Constructional Scheme. A conventional hydro-electric scheme was proposed with a capacity of 130 MW, and the proposed scheme included two much smaller power stations, at Loch Morar and Kyle of Lochalsh, which demonstrated the Board's commitment to supplying remote areas with electricity. Several formal objections to the Loch Sloy scheme were raised, and a bitter public enquiry was held in Edinburgh, which lasted six days. At the end of it John Cameron KC decided that the scheme was in the public interest, and it was approved on 28 March 1945.

The second Constructional Scheme was the Tummel hydro-electric power scheme, which again included a smaller remote scheme at Gairloch. While most of the board had been rattled by the public enquiry for Sloy, MacColl argued that they should push on immediately, to ensure that the principles of the 1943 Act were upheld. The scheme was economical, and the income it generated would enable them to finance smaller projects which they could never expect to be so. The scheme included a power station at Pitlochry, and there was a huge outcry at the proposals. The Secretary of State for Scotland, Tom Johnston, appointed a tribunal to consider the objections, with John Camerson supported by Sir Robert Bryce Walker and Major G H M Brown Lindsay. When the time came to give evidence, MacColl was unable to attend, as he had been ill and was recovering from an operation. Lord Airlie spoke in his place and without MacColl's technical expertise, was savaged in the witness box. Several of the Panel of Technical Advisors gave evidence in place of MacColl, and acquitted themselves well. Ultimately, the tribunal found in favour of the Board, and the Tummel Scheme was authorised on 19 November 1945.

MacColl's commitment to good design was illustrated by the small Loch Morar and Kyle of Lochalsh schemes. James Shearer was the architect for these, and became fascinated by what he called the "cottage architecture" of the Highlands. He approached MacColl to see if he could use local stone for the power stations, which would be more costly than concrete. MacColl then organised a visit to see a concrete dam, for Shearer and other members of the Board. They noted the effects of weathering on concrete, and MacColl then asked Shearer to draw up a list of locations where Highland stone could be obtained by contractors for the various schemes. He then ordered significant quantities of stone from some of them, to ensure that they would remain in business. Many of the Board's power stations were subsequently built of sandstone, or clad with it. Two quarries that benefitted were Greenbrae Quarry at Hopeman near Elgin and Tarradale Quarry at Muir of Ord. Not only did this encourage local enterprise, but it also meant that the Board could not be accused of environmental vandalism quite so readily.

== Personal life ==
In 1911, MacColl attended a Concert for Dumbarton charities, and met Margaret McDiarmid Donald on the platform of the event. They were married in the summer of 1916, the delay between their meeting and their marriage caused by the fact that MacColl's stepfather had died. He had not taken care of his affairs, and MacColl was helping his mother by supporting his step-brother and step-daughter. The couple had a son of their own, called Alastair, and later a daughter named Sheila. Margaret was particularly good at telling stories, and MacColl enjoyed listening to them, as his own mother had never told him stories. He developed a keen interest in Norse and Celtic legends.

They owned a Sunbeam tourer car, and regularly drove from Dumbarton to Loch Lomond side on Saturdays when the weather was suitable. Each summer, he and Margaret set aside a month to explore the Highlands, and this exploration may have been the source of his great knowledge of available water supplies.

In May 1941, MacColl's house in Overcliffe, Dumbarton, was destroyed during a bombing raid on the town. A number of staff from the Central Electricity Board helped him to recover clothes and other personal items from the wreckage, and he moved into Arden House, a house which had been bought to provide office space for some of the staff, and which could be used as the Board's main office in an emergency. It was located on the shore of Loch Lomond, near Bannachra. His house at Overcliffe was not rebuilt until after he died. Although he was generally healthy for most of his life, he became ill in 1943, and was confined to bed for several weeks.

== Bibliography ==
- Brown, Guthrie, ed. (1958). Hydro-Electric Engineering Practice. Blackie.
- Donkin, S B (1952). "Hydro-Electric Development in Scotland - Discussion". Proceedings of the Institution of Civil Engineers. 1 (3). Institution of Civil Engineers: 277–301. doi:10.1680/iicep.1952.10954. Archived from the original on 27 January 2023.
- Fraser, Norrie, ed. (1956). Sir Edward MacColl - A maker of modern Scotland. Edinburgh: Stanley Press.
- Miller, James (2002). The Dam Builders. Birlinn. ISBN 978-1-84158-225-2.
- Payne, Peter L (1988). The Hydro. Aberdeen University Press. ISBN 978-0-08-036584-8.
- Wood, Emma (2002). The Hydro Boys - Pioneers of Renewable Energy. Luath Press. ISBN 978-1-84282-016-2.
