= Dash for Gas =

1990s movement towards natural gas–based electricity generation in Britain

The Dash for Gas was the 1990s shift by the newly privatized companies in the electricity sector of the United Kingdom towards generation of electricity using natural gas. Gas consumption peaked in 2001 and has been in decline since 2010.

UK gas production, consumption, and net exports 1970–2024

The key reasons for this shift were: (a) political: The privatization of the UK electricity industry in 1990; the regulatory change that allowed gas to be used as a fuel for power generation; (b) economic: the high interest rates of the time, which favoured gas turbine power stations, which were quick to build, over coal and nuclear power stations, which were larger but slower to build; the decline in wholesale gas prices; the desire by the regional electricity companies to diversify their sources of electricity supply and establish a foothold in the profitable generation market; (c) technical: advances in electricity generation technology (specifically combined cycle gas turbine generators (CCGT) with higher relative efficiencies and lower capital costs. An underpinning factor in the dash for gas was the recent development of North Sea gas.

In 1990, gas turbine power stations made up 5% of the UK's generating capacity. By 2002, the new CCGT power stations made up 28% UK generating capacity; gas turbines accounted for a further 2%. It is estimated the Dash for Gas cost £11bn.

Gas-fired power stations with more than 30 MW installed capacity commissioned between 1990 and 2002 are listed below.

Year of commission or year generation began	Power Station Name	Installed capacity, MW	Location (Scotland, Wales, Northern Ireland, or English region)	Date of mothballing/ closure
1991	Roosecote Power Station	229 (before being mothballed in March 2012 pending demolition by spring 2015)	North West England	2012
1992	Teesside Power Station	1875 (45 MW from OCGT after mothballing most of the power station in 2011)	North East England	2011 (partial - mothballed)
1993	Glanford Brigg Power Station	260	Yorkshire and the Humber	
1993	Killingholme B power station	900	Yorkshire and the Humber	
1993	Peterborough Power Station	405	East of England	
1993	Rye House Power Station	715	East of England	
1993	Corby Power Station	401	East Midlands	
1994	Killingholme A power station	665	Yorkshire and the Humber	
1994	Keadby Power Station	749	Yorkshire and the Humber	
1994	Barking Power Station	1000	London	
1994	Derwent Power Station	228	East Midlands	2012
1994	Deeside Power Station	500	Wales	
1994	Knapton Power Station	40	Yorkshire and the Humber	
1995	Charterhouse St Power Station	31	London	
1995	Fellside Power Station	180	North West England	
1995	Little Barford Power Station	665	East of England	
1995	Medway Power Station	688	South East England	
1996	Connah's Quay Power Station	1380	Wales	
1996	South Humber Bank Power Station	1285	Yorkshire and the Humber	
1996	Kings Lynn Power Station	340	East of England	
1998	Barry Power Station	230	Wales	
1998	Didcot B Power Station	1430	South East England	
1998	Rocksavage Power Station	810	North West England	
1998	Thornhill Power Station	50	Yorkshire and the Humber	
1998	Seabank 1 Power Station	812	South West England	
1999	Cottam Development Centre	390	East Midlands	
1999	Sutton Bridge Power Station	819	East Midlands	
1999	Enfield Power Station	408	London	
1999	Sandbach Power Station	50	North West England	
2000	Damhead Creek Power Station	800	South East England	
2000	Salt End Power Station	1200	Yorkshire and the Humber	
2000	Seabank 2 Power Station	410	South West England	
2000	Shoreham Power Station	400	South East England	
2000	Fife Power Station	123 (before closed in March 2011)	Scotland	2011
2001	Coryton Power Station	753	East of England	
2001	Great Yarmouth Power Station	420	East of England	
2001	Shotton Power Station	45	Wales	
2002	Baglan Bay Power Station	510	Wales	
2002	Castleford Power Station	56	Yorkshire and the Humber	
