= List of power stations in Wales =

This is a list of electricity-generating power stations in Wales, sorted by type and name, with installed capacity (May 2007).

Note that the DBERR maintains a comprehensive list of operational UK power stations here:

== Nuclear power stations ==
Nuclear power stations

| Name | Location | Coordinates | Output | Notes |
|---|---|---|---|---|
| Trawsfynydd | Gwynedd | 52°55′29.51″N 3°56′54.38″W | 470 MW | (Decommissioned in 1991) |
| Wylfa | Anglesey | 53°25′00″N 4°29′00″W | 980 MW | (Decommissioned in 2015) |

== Coal-fired ==
Coal-fired power stations:

| Name | Location | Coordinates | Output | Notes |
|---|---|---|---|---|
| Aberthaw power stations | Vale of Glamorgan | 51°23′14″N 3°24′18″W | 1,500 MW | (Decommissioned in 2020) |
| Uskmouth A Power Station | Near Newport | 51°32′57″N 2°58′14″W | 228 MW | (Decommissioned in 1981) |
| Uskmouth B Power Station | Near Newport | 51°32′57″N 2°58′14″W | 393 MW | Initially burning coal with intermittent biomass firing up until 2017, planned conversion to burn biomass and waste abandoned. Decommissioned by 2024. |
| Cardiff power stations | Cardiff | 51°29′42″N 3°8′45″W | 87.6 MW | Commissioned 1894 operational until late 1960s |
| Carmarthen Bay Power Station | Burry Port | 51°40′47″N 4°14′35″W | 360 MW | (Decommissioned in 1984) |
| Llanelly Power Station | Llanelli | 51°41′33″N 4°10′15″W | 24 MW | operating until 1967 |
| Marchwiel Power Station | Wrexham | 53°01′55″N 2°55′25″W | 12.41 MW | operating until 1959 |
| Newport power stations | Newport | 51°35′11″N 2°59′08″W | 80 MW | operating 1895 to late 1970s |
| Rogerstone power station | Rogerstone near Newport | | 126 MW | (Decommissioned in 1984) |
| Llynfi Power Station | Bridgend | 51°34′13″N 3°36′40″W | 120 MW | (Decommissioned in 1977) |
| Tir John Power Station | Swansea | 51°37′35″N 3°53′50″W | 142 MW | Oil-fired from 1967 (Decommissioned in 1976) |
| Upper Boat Power Station | Pontypridd | 51°34′34″N 3°18′07″W | 144 MW | (Decommissioned in 1972) |
| Penarth power station | | | 2.2 MW | Operating 1948/9, closed by 1958/9 |
| Bridgend power station | | | 2.0 MW | Operating 1948/9, closed by 1958/9 |
| Pontypridd power station | | | 1.8 MW | Operating 1948/9, closed by 1958/9 |
| Penydarren power station | | | 0.52 MW | Operating 1948/9, closed by 1958/9 |

== Gas-fired (or combined gas/coal) ==
Gas (or combined gas/coal) fired power stations:

| Name | Location | Coordinates | Output | Notes |
|---|---|---|---|---|
| Baglan Bay Power Station | Neath Port Talbot | 51°37′11″N 3°49′47″W | 582 MW | Closed in 2020 |
| Barry Power Station | Vale of Glamorgan | 51°24′29″N 3°13′43″W | 245 MW | Decommissioned March 2019 |
| Connah's Quay Power Station | Flintshire | 53°13′56″N 3°04′53″W | 1,380 MW | Originally coal-fired PF, 6x Parsons 30 MW turbines. Commissioned 1955. |
| Deeside Power Station | Flintshire | 53°14′02″N 3°02′02″W | 500 MW | |
| Pembroke Power Station | Pembroke | 51°40′59″N 4°59′18″W | 2,000 MW | (Planning approved 2009), operational 2012 |
| Severn Power Station | Uskmouth | 51°32′52″N 2°58′35″W | 824 MW | Mothballed August 2020 |
| Shotton Power Station | Flintshire | 53°14′02″N 3°01′58″W | 210 MW | CHP (decommissioned 2012) |
| BioGen Gwyriad | Gwynedd | 53.047741°N 2.993057°W | 3.5 MW | Biogas |

== Hydro-electric ==
Hydro-electric power stations:

| Name | Location | Coordinates | Output | Notes |
|---|---|---|---|---|
| Cwm Dyli hydro Power Station | Gwynedd | | 10 MW | commissioned 1906 operational |
| Dinorwig Power Station | Gwynedd | 53°7′7″N 4°6′50″W | 1,728 MW | (pumped storage) |
| Dolgarrog power station | Conwy (county borough) | 53°11′28″N 3°50′33″W | 28 MW | commissioned 1907 operational 2020 |
| Dolgelley power station | Dolgellau | | 148 kW | hydro + oil engine |
| Ffestiniog Power Station | Gwynedd | 52°58′51″N 3°58′8″W | 360 MW | (pumped storage) |
| Machynlleth A Power Station | Powys | | 250 kW | hydro + oil engine |
| Maentwrog power station | Gwynedd | 52°56′10″N 4°0′15″W | 30 MW | commissioned 1928, refitted 1988-92 |
| Rheidol Power Station | Ceredigion | 52°23′46″N 3°54′00″W | 56 MW | |
| River Tawe Barrage | Swansea | 51°36′58″N 3°55′44″W | 200 kW | |
| Towyn power station | Tywyn | | 950 kW | hydro + oil engine |
| Radyr Hydro Scheme | Cardiff | 51°31′9.79″N 3°15′13.50″W | 394 kW | Hydro (River Weir Screw Turbines) |
| Llys-y-frân Reservoir | Pembrokeshire | 51°52′5″N 4°51′08″W | 37 kW | |
| Gafr Hydro | Gwynedd | 53°06′22″N 4°04′53″W | 350 kW | |
| Strata Florida Water Treatment Works | Ceredigion | 52°16′39.5″N 3°49′29.7″W | 140 kW | |
| Llyn Brianne Reservoir | Carmarthenshire | 52°07′10.3″N 3°45′59.8″W | 4.6 MW | |
| Bryn Cowlyd Upper | Conwy (county borough) | 53°10′12.2″N 3°51′39.2″W | 200 kW | |
| Bryn Cowlyd Lower | Conwy (county borough) | 53°10′35.9″N 3°50′45.6″W | 200 kW | |
| Caban Coch Reservoir | Powys | 52°16′06.7″N 3°34′33.6″W | 950 kW | |
| Pen-y-garreg, Craig Goch and Claerwen Reservoirs | Powys | 52°15′46.4″N 3°36′21.9″W | 2.91 MW | 3 turbines, one on each reservoir |
| Cwmorthin Hydro | Gwynedd | 52°59′41.3″N 3°58′10.1″W | 410 kW | |
| Ffestiniog Hydroelectric | Gwynedd | 52°58′31.0″N 3°56′44.9″W | 710 kW | |
| Llyn Celyn Reservoir | Gwynedd | 52°56′42.8″N 3°40′06.1″W | 4.5 MW | |
| Alwen Water Treatment Works | Denbighshire | 53°03′45.4″N 3°33′22.3″W | 37 kW | |
| Brenig Reservoir | Denbighshire | 53°04′23.1″N 3°31′53.6″W | 60 kW | |
| Cefn Dryscoed Water Treatment Works | Powys | 51°46′22.3″N 3°34′58.7″W | 70 kW | |
| Crai Water Treatment Works | Powys | 51°50′31.5″N 3°40′08.0″W | 90 kW | |
| Dolbenmaen Water Treatment Works | Gwynedd | 52°57′48.6″N 4°14′07.6″W | 89 kW | |
| Eithynfynydd Water Treatment Works | Gwynedd | 52°46′27.9″N 4°04′29.0″W | 30 kW | |
| Preseli Water Treatment Works | Pembrokeshire | 51°55′05.0″N 4°49′03.9″W | 37 kW | |
| Pen Y Cefn Water Treatment Works | Gwynedd | 52°44′58.7″N 3°53′07.9″W | 12 kW | |
| Tyn Y Waun Water Treatment Works | Rhondda Cynon Taf | 51°40′55.7″N 3°32′47.8″W | 90 kW | |

== Oil-fired ==
Oil-fired power stations:

| Name | Location | Coordinates | Output | Notes |
|---|---|---|---|---|
| Aberystwyth Power Station | Ceredigion | 52°24′45″N 4°5′3″W | 5.0 MW | Diesel fired generators, closed by 1978 |
| Haverfordwest Power Station | Pembrokeshire | | 8.465 MW | Oil engines (8) operational 1959 |
| Machynlleth A and B power stations | Powys | | 522 kW (A), 4.258 MW (B) | Diesel fired generators, closed by 1978 |
| Milford Haven Power Station | Pembrokeshire | | 815 kW | Oil engines, closed 28 February 1958 |
| Pembroke Power Station | Pembrokeshire | 51°40′59″N 4°59′18″W | 2,000 MW | closed 1999, now demolished |
| Lampeter power station | | | 400 kW | Internal combustion (diesel), Operating 1948/9, closed by 1958/9 |
| Llandrindod Wells power station | | | 231 kW | Internal combustion (diesel), Operating 1948/9, closed by 1958/9 |
| St Clears power station | | | 113 kW | Internal combustion (diesel), Operating 1948/9, closed by 1958/9 |
| Aberayron power station | | | 100 kW | Internal combustion (diesel), Operating 1948/9, closed by 1958/9 |

== Wind power ==
Wind power generating facilities:

| Name | Location | Coordinates | Output | Notes |
|---|---|---|---|---|
| Alltwalis Wind Farm | Carmarthenshire | 51°58′24″N 4°15′3″W | 23 MW | |
| Brechfa Forest Wind Farm | Gwernogle, Carmarthenshire | | 90 MW | |
| Carno wind farm | Carno, Powys, Mid Wales | 52°33′1″N 3°36′1″W | 49 MW | |
| Cefn Croes wind farm | Ceredigion | 52°24′18″N 3°45′03″W | 58.5 MW | |
| Moel Maelogen | Conwy | 53°08′07″N 3°43′25″W | 14.3 MW | |
| North Hoyle Offshore Wind Farm | Liverpool Bay | 53°26′N 3°24′W | 60 MW | |
| Pen y Cymoedd | Neath | 51°41′01″N 03°41′01″W | 228 MW | |
| Rhyd-y-Groes | Anglesey | | 7.0 MW | |
| Rhyl Flats | Liverpool Bay | 53°22′N 03°39′W | 90 MW | |
| Gwynt y Môr | Irish Sea | 53°27′N 03°35′W | 576 MW | (consent granted 2008, construction began 2011) |

== Anaerobic Digesters ==
Anaerobic digester generating facilities:

| Name | Location | Coordinates | Output | Notes |
|---|---|---|---|---|
| Cardiff East Wastewater Treatment Works | Cardiff | 51°28′39.3″N 3°8′12.4″W | 4.2 MW | Anaerobic Digestion with Combined Heat and Power |
| Afan Wastewater Treatment Works | Neath Port Talbot | 51°34′16.3″N 3°47′21.9″W | 3.0 MW | Anaerobic Digestion with Combined Heat and Power |
| Five Fords Wastewater Treatment Works | Wrexham | 53°01′29.4″N 2°56′57.1″W | 1.2 MW | Anaerobic Digestion with Gas to Grid and Combined Heat and Power |
| Cog Moors Wastewater Treatment Works | Vale of Glamorgan | 51°25′10.0″N 3°12′22.1″W | 390 kW | Anaerobic Digestion with Combined Heat and Power |
| Kinmel Bay Wastewater Treatment Works | Conwy County | 53°17′39.2″N 3°31′17.3″W | 190 kW | Anaerobic Digestion with Combined Heat and Power |
| Llanfoist Wastewater Treatment Works | Monmouthshire | 51°48′49.1″N 3°01′03.6″W | 177 kW | Anaerobic Digestion with Combined Heat and Power |
| Swansea Bay Wastewater Treatment Works | Swansea | 51°37′13.6″N 3°53′42.1″W | 580 kW | Anaerobic Digestion with Combined Heat and Power |
| Queensferry Wastewater Treatment Works | Flintshire | 53°12′24.4″N 3°00′54.7″W | 190 kW | Anaerobic Digestion with Combined Heat and Power |

== See also ==
- List of power stations in England
- List of power stations in Northern Ireland
- List of power stations in Scotland
