= Towyn power station =

Towyn power station was a combined oil engine and hydro-electric generating station in Wales. It provided electricity to the towns of Towyn (Tywyn) and Aberdovey (Aberdyfi) and the surrounding district from the 1930s to the 1960s.

== History ==
Towyn, Aberdovey and District Electricity Company Limited built a combined oil engine and water-turbine electricity generating plant at Happy Valley Towyn. Upon the nationalisation of the British electricity supply industry in 1948 the Towyn power station was vested in the British Electricity Authority. The power station was decommissioned in the 1960s.

=== Power station owners ===
The owners of the power station over its operational life were: Towyn, Aberdovey and District Electricity Company Limited (until 1948), British Electricity Authority (1948–55), Central Electricity Authority (1955–57), Central Electricity Generating Board (from 1958).

== Plant and equipment ==
The plant at Towyn power station comprised:

- 5 × 183 kW oil engine sets, total capacity of 916 kW
- 1 × 34 kW water turbine set

The total generating capacity was 950 kW, the generating sets operated at 380, 400 and 420 V.

- In December 1951 a 400 kW English Electric diesel engine set was transferred from Aberystwyth power station.

== Operations ==
The operating conditions and electricity output of Towyn power station were:

Towyn power station operating parameters 1946–63
Year	Running hours	Plant capacity kW	Electricity sent out MWh	Load factor per cent	Thermal efficiency per cent
1946	–	–	1,291	36.4	–
1954	6948	950	1,631	24.7	–
1955	5212	950	1,726	34.9	–
1956	4345	950	1,262	30.6	–
1957	1661	950	321	20.3	–
1958	3997	900	909	23.9	–
1961	–	574	119	1.5	27.72
1962	–	642	139	2.8	28.54
1963	–	642	521	11.9	29.19

== See also ==
- Timeline of the UK electricity supply industry
- List of power stations in Wales
- Hydroelectricity in the United Kingdom
