= Machynlleth power stations =

Power stations in Wales

Machynlleth power stations were two small electricity generating stations in Machynlleth Powys. They provided electricity to the town and the surrounding rural district from 1938 until the 1970s. The A station was a combined diesel & hydro-electric plant and the B station was a diesel engine plant.

== History ==
Machynlleth Electric Supply Company Limited (founded in 1932) proposed an electricity supply scheme for Machynlleth in 1938. The company constructed a combined diesel engine and water-turbine electricity generating plant, later known as Machynlleth A. Upon the nationalisation of the British electricity supply industry in 1948 the Electric Supply Company was abolished and Machynlleth power station was vested in the British Electricity Authority (BEA). In 1956 the BEA's successor the Central Electricity Authority (CEA) constructed the diesel-fired Machynlleth B, which was commissioned in September 1956. One of the diesel engines of the A station was transferred to the B station in 1956. The A power station was decommissioned in the 1960s, and the B station by 1978.

== Plant and equipment ==
=== A station plant ===
The plant at Machynlleth A power station comprised:

- 1 × 110 horsepower (82 kW ) Francis water turbine
- 1 × 35 horsepower (26 kW ) Francis water turbine
- 1 × 100 horsepower (75 kW ) diesel engine
- 1 × 200 horsepower (149 kW ) diesel engine
- 1 × 400 horsepower (298 kW ) diesel engine

The turbines and engines drove a range of alternators:

- 1 × 23 kW Brush alternator
- 1 × 57 kW Brush alternator
- 1 × 66 kW Brush alternator
- 1 × 104 kW Brush alternator

The total generating capacity was 250 kW, 3-phase, 400 V AC.

=== B station plant ===
The plant at Machynlleth B power station comprised:

- 3 × 1,330 kW Mirlees 8-cylinder four-stroke supercharged diesel engines driving:
- 3 × Brush 6.6 kV alternators
- 1 × 268 kW Petters 4 cylinder two-stroke diesel engine with a Brush generator (transferred from the A station in 1956).

The total installed generating capacity of the B station was 4.258 MW.

Cooling water for the engines was drawn from the Afon Dulas.

== Operations ==
The operating conditions and electricity output of Machynlleth A power station were:

Machynlleth A power station operating parameters 1946–63
Year	Running hours	Plant capacity kW	Electricity sent out MWh	Load factor per cent	Thermal efficiency per cent
1946	–	–	522	34.2	–
1954	7500	518	1,232	31.7	–
1955	5680	518	1,406	47.8	–
1956	5480	518	1,219	42.9	–
1957	5959	518	560	18.1	–
1958	4119	500	248	11.6	–
1961	–	250	256	11.7	27.9
1962	–	250	89	4.1	26.73
1963	–	250	193	5.43	26.24

The electricity 'sent out' data is the total output from both the hydro-electric and diesel plants. The proportions of diesel to hydro-electric generation was typically:

Year	Hydro-electric kWh	Diesel kWh
1946	256,440	270,512
1963	74,000	119,000

The operating conditions and electricity output of Machynlleth B power station were:

Machynlleth B power station operating parameters 1957–72
Year	Running hours	Plant capacity kW	Electricity sent out MWh	Load factor per cent	Thermal efficiency per cent
1957	184	3990	200	27.2	–
1958	1036	3990	2,146	49.0	–
1961	–	4258	6,310	16.9	33.79
1962	–	4258	10,386	27.8	35.33
1963	–	4258	13,712	36.83	34.9
1967	–	3990	14,843	41.5	35.03
1972	–	3990	4,077	11.6	31.18

== See also ==
- Timeline of the UK electricity supply industry
- List of power stations in Wales
- Hydroelectricity in the United Kingdom
