= Maentwrog power station =

Hydro-electric power station in Wales

- Country: Wales
- Location: Maentwrog Gwynedd
- Coordinates: 52°56′10″N 04°00′15″W
- Status: Operational
- Commission date: 1928
- Owners: North Wales Power Company Limited (1926–1948); British Electricity Authority (1948–1955); Central Electricity Authority (1955–1957); Central Electricity Generating Board (1958–1990); Nuclear Electric (1990–2004); Nuclear Decommissioning Authority (2004–present)
- Operator: Nuclear Restoration Services

Power generation
- Units operational: 2 x 15 MW
- Nameplate capacity: 24 MW (1928-1988) 30 MW (1992-)
- Annual net output: 60.6 GWh (2019)

Maentwrog power station was built by the North Wales Power Company and supplied electricity to North Wales, Deeside and Cheshire. It exploits the water resources of the Snowdonia mountains, using water turbines to drive electricity alternators. The 24 MW station has been owned by several organisations; since 2004 it has been owned by the Nuclear Decommissioning Authority. It generates an annual electricity output of 60.6 GWh.

== History ==
Maentwrog hydro-electric power station was first commissioned in October 1928 by the North Wales Power Company Limited. It was later extended under the terms of the North Wales Hydro-Electric Power Act 1952. The company also owned Dolgarrog and Cwm Dyli power stations. The new station was financed by the issue of £1.7 million of debenture stock in 1924. The architectural design of the power house was by Sir Alexander Gibb & Partners.

To power the station a new reservoir was built at Trawsfynydd, formed by the construction of four dams. The main dam on the Afon Prysor was Britain's first large arch dam. The other three cut off dams were Gyfynys, Hendre Mur and Trawsfynydd. In 1925, members of the North Wales and South Cheshire Joint Electricity Authority visited the dam at Maentwrog, then under construction. They reported that they were "greatly impressed with the magnitude of the work and with the expeditious way in which this great work is being carried out".

The reservoir is 650 ft (200 m) above the power station. It has an area of 2 square miles (5.2 km^{2}) and can hold 33,000,000 cubic metres (1.2×10^{9} cu ft) of water.

Water flows to the power station through a 9 ft 6 in (2.90 m) diameter low pressure pipeline and two tunnels, plus a 6 ft (1.8 m) diameter high pressure line. The working head of water is 630 ft (190 m). The station initially had a capacity of 18 MW, but this was increased in 1934 to 24 MW by an additional 6 MW generator set fed by a 5 ft (1.5 m) diameter high pressure pipeline.

By 1925, the transmission lines of the North Wales and South Cheshire Joint Electricity Authority to which the North Wales Power Company was connected extended from Pwllheli to Runcorn and to the borders of Staffordshire, and served an area of 1,200 square miles (3,100 km^{2}).

The operation of the stations was dependent on rainfall. In the year 1935/6, the North Wales Power Company noted that rainfall was well above average, with 144.4 inches (3,670 mm) of rain at Cwm Dyli. As a result, the company's three stations (Maentwrog, Cwm Dyli and Dolgarrog) were able to generate a total of 93,199,950 MWh of electricity.

In 1960, the catchment area of the reservoir was increased by 14.5 square miles (38 km^{2}), which included the construction of 8 miles (13 km) of leets or open channels. The operation of the Trawsfynydd nuclear power station from 1965 to 1991, using the reservoir for cooling water, restricted the height of water available for hydro-electricity.

In 1988, construction work began on a replacement dam 75 m (246 ft) downstream of the original arch dam. The S-shaped dam is 219 m (719 ft) long and 38.8 m (127 ft) high, it contains 54,500 cubic metres (1,920,000 cu ft) of concrete.

== Owners ==
Maentwrog power station has been owned by the following organisations, through nationalisation, reorganisation and privatisation of the electricity industry.

- North Wales Power Company Limited (1926–1948)
- British Electricity Authority (1948–1955), nationalisation 1948
- Central Electricity Authority (1955–1957)
- Central Electricity Generating Board (1958–1990)
- Nuclear Electric (1990–1996)
- Magnox Electric (1996-2004)
- Nuclear Decommissioning Authority (2004–present).

Maentwrog power station was vested in Nuclear Electric when the British electricity supply industry was split up prior to privatisation in 1990. It was then moved to Magnox Electric in 1996 when Nuclear Electric was merged with Scottish Nuclear. From 2004, the Nuclear Decommissioning Authority (NDA) assumed ownership although operations are devolved to NDA site licence company Nuclear Restoration Services.

== Plant and equipment ==
The original generating plant comprised four 6 MW Boving-English Electric 6.6 kV generating sets. The alternator exciters are directly coupled, 40 kW, 110 V.

There were English Electric and Ferranti step up transformers, from 6.6 kV to 20, 33, and 66 kV.

The original plant was removed in 1989-1992 and new plant with a generating capacity of 30 MW (two 1 MW) was installed.

== Operations ==
Operating data for the period 1935–92 was:

Maentwrog power station utilisation and output, 1935–92
Year	Running hours	Max output capacity MW	Electrical energy supplied MWh	Load factor per cent
1935	–	24	37,294	–
1946	–	24	34,181	29.6
1954	5386	24	28,431	22.0
1955	4371	24	51,729	49.3
1956	4112	24	23,456	23.8
1957	5710	24	51,133	37.3
1958	5553	24	59,259	44.5
1961	–	24	39,203	18.6
1962	–	24	37,594	17.9
1963	–	24	32,628	15.52
1967	–	24	48,220	22.9
1972	–	24	31,965	15.2
1979	–	24	42,055	20.0
1982	–	24	52,195	24.8
1986	–	24	47,956	22.9
1992	–	30	?	?

Station output in MWh

The station is operated by Magnox Ltd on behalf of the Nuclear Decommissioning Authority.

== See also ==
- Timeline of the UK electricity supply industry
- List of power stations in Wales
- Hydroelectricity in the United Kingdom
