= Newport power stations =

Former power station in Wales

- Country: Wales
- Location: Newport
- Coordinates: 51°35′11″N 02°59′08″W
- Status: Decommissioned
- Construction began: 1892
- Commission date: 1895
- Decommission date: 1970s
- Owners: Newport Corporation (1895–1948); British Electricity Authority (1948–1955); Central Electricity Authority (1955–1957); Central Electricity Generating Board (1958–1972)
- Operator: as owner

Thermal power station
- Primary fuel: Coal
- Turbine technology: Steam turbines
- Cooling source: Estuary water

Power generation
- Units operational: 2 × 30 MW 2 × 10 MW
- Make and model: Fraser-Chalmers/GEC, Escher Wyss-Brown-Boveri
- Nameplate capacity: 80 MW
- Annual net output: 400,000 MWh (1954)

The Newport power stations supplied electricity to the town of Newport and the surrounding area from 1895 to the late 1970s. The original power station was in Llanarth Street which supplied electric lighting; a larger station, known as the East power station, was built in Corporation Road from 1903. They were owned and operated by Newport Corporation prior to the nationalisation of the British electricity supply industry in 1948. The East power station was redeveloped in the 1920s and 1940s to meet the increased demand for electricity.

== History ==
In 1891 Newport Corporation applied for a provisional order under the Electric Lighting Acts to generate and supply electricity to the town. The Newport (Mon.) Electric Lighting Order 1891 was granted by the Board of Trade and was confirmed by Parliament through the Electric Lighting Orders Confirmation (No. 11) Act 1891 (54 & 55 Vict. c. cv). The original power station was built in Llanarth Street, Newport (51°35′12″N 02°59′35″W) and it first supplied electricity on 14 October 1895. Further equipment was added to meet the rising demand for electricity; by the 1920s it had a generating capacity of 600 kW.

A larger power station was built in Corporation Road (51°35′11″N 02°59′08″W) this was known as the East power station, on the east side of the River Usk. This supplied electricity to the Newport Corporation Tramways. The power station was expanded with new generating plant between 1925 and 1929 and again in 1941 and 1948. These additions brought the generating capacity to 80.5 MW. The East power station operated until the late 1970s

== Equipment specification ==
The initial installation of plant at the Llanarth Street site in 1895 comprised horizontal compound engines coupled by ropes to Hall dynamos. The plant had a rating of 350 kW.

The station was supplied with coal via a siding off the nearby dockside railway sidings.

By 1922 the plant at Llanarth Street comprised boilers delivering 28,000 lb/h (3.53 kg/s) of steam to 2 × 300 kW reciprocating engines.

=== Plant in 1923 ===
By 1923 the generating plant at the East power station comprised:

Coal-fired boilers generating up to 150,000 lb/h (18.9 kg/s) of steam which was supplied to:

Generators:

- 1 × 200 kW reciprocating engine with DC generator
- 1 × 300 kW reciprocating engine with DC generator
- 2 × 500 kW reciprocating engines with DC generators
- 1 × 1,500 kW steam turbo-alternator AC
- 1 × 3,000 kW steam turbo-alternator AC
- 1 × 3,750 kW steam turbo-alternator AC
- 1 × 5,000 kW steam turbo-alternator AC.

These machines gave a total generating capacity of 14,750 kW comprising 13,250 kW of alternating current (AC) plus 1,500 kW of direct current (DC).

Electricity supplies to consumers were:

- 200 & 100 Volts, single phase, 87.5 Hz AC (from Llanarth Street)
- 200 & 100 Volts, single phase, 50 Hz AC
- 400 & 230 Volts, 3-phase, 50 Hz AC
- 460 & 230 Volts DC
- 500 V DC Traction current

=== Plant in 1924–48 ===
New plant was commissioned at the East power station in 1925 and 1929 (known as the low pressure plant), and again in 1941 and 1948 (high pressure plant). This comprised:

- Low pressure boilers:
  - 1 × Babcock & Wilcox 60,000 lb/h (7.56 kg/s) boiler, steam conditions 260 psi and 560 °F (17.9 bar, 293 °C)
  - 2 × Babcock & Wilcox 80,000 lb/h (10.08 kg/s) boilers, steam conditions 260 psi and 670 °F (17.9 bar, 312 °C)
- High pressure boilers:
  - 2 × Babcock & Wilcox 150,000 lb/h (18.9 kg/s) boilers, steam conditions 625 psi and 875 °F (43.1 bar, 468 °C)
  - 2 × Babcock & Wilcox 180,000 lb/h (22.7 kg/s) boilers, steam conditions 625 psi and 875 °F (43.1 bar, 468 °C)

The boilers supplied steam to:

- High pressure generators:
  - 2 × 30 MW Fraser-Chalmers/GEC turbo-alternator, generating at 6.2 and 11.8 kV, installed in 1941 and 1948
- Low pressure generators:
  - 1 × 10 MW Escher Wyss-Brown-Boveri turbo-alternator, generating at 6.2 kV, installed in 1925
  - 1 × 10 MW Escher Wyss-GEC Bellis turbo-alternator, generating at 6.2 kV, installed in 1929
  - 1 × 0.5 MW Allen-GEC house set

The station was supplied with coal via a siding off the nearby railway line.

Condenser cooling water was drawn from the tidal river at 5 million gallons per hour (6.31 m^{3}/s).

== Operations ==
=== Operating data 1898 ===
Operating data for 1898 included:

- Electricity sold: to consumers 99,410 kWh; for public lamps 96,522 kWh; total 195,932 kWh
- No. of lamps on circuits: 11,994
- No. of Public lamps: 42
- Revenue from sales of electricity was £3,467; the cost of generation was £1,599.

=== Operating data 1921–23 ===
The electricity supply data for the period 1921–23 was:

Newport power station supply data 1921–23
Electricity Use	Units	Year		
Electricity Use	Units	1921	1922	1923
Lighting and domestic	MWh	2,136	2,276	2,620
Public lighting	MWh	604	576	607
Traction	MWh	1,798	1,616	1,792
Power	MWh	3,895	4,583	8,163
Bulk supply	MWh	0	0	0
Total use	MWh	8,432	9,052	13,183

The electricity loads on the system were:

Year		1921	1922	1923
Maximum load	kW	4,765	5,085	7,840
Total connections	kW	17,086	22,311	23,700
Load factor	Per cent	28.5	28.6	26.3

Revenue from sales of current (in 1923) was £126,084; the surplus of revenue over expenses (1923) was £60,763.

By the late 1930s the supply area was 53 square miles (137 km^{2}) and there were 25,000 consumers. The corporation tramways ceased operating in September 1937.

=== Operating data 1946 ===
Newport power station operating data for 1946 is:

Generating capacity MW	Load factor per cent	Max output load MW	Electricity supplied MWh	Thermal efficiency per cent
58.75	47.0	65.01	221,938	19.96

The British electricity supply industry was nationalised in 1948 under the provisions of the Electricity Act 1947 (10 & 11 Geo. 6. c. 54). The Newport electricity undertaking was abolished, ownership of Newport power station was vested in the British Electricity Authority, and subsequently the Central Electricity Authority and the Central Electricity Generating Board (CEGB). At the same time the electricity distribution and sales responsibilities of the Newport electricity undertaking were transferred to the South Wales Electricity Board (SWEB).

=== Operating data 1954–72 ===
Operating data for the period 1954–72 was:

Newport power station operating data, 1954–72
Year	Running hours or load factor (per cent)	Max output capacity MW	Electricity supplied GWh	Thermal efficiency per cent
Low pressure
1954	3647	22	33.799	11.02
1955	2530	18	22.940	11.73
1956	2349	18	15.825	11.20
1957	1530	18	9.859	10.04
1958	1040	18	6.391	8.47
High pressure
1954	8589	57	364.417	24.56
1955	8263	57	309.144	24.50
1956	7261	57	286.102	24.98
1957	6317	57	227.823	24.74
1958	5323	57	172.669	24.02
Total output
1961	23.4 %	75	153.476	22.01
1962	15.1 %	75	99.478	18.88
1963	21.48 %	75	141.119	20.88
1967	11.1 %	75	73.001	9.03
1972	5.5 %	57	27.368	14.24

Output from the stations in MWh

== Newport supply district ==
Following nationalisation Newport became an electricity supply district, covering 79.2 square miles (205 km^{2}) with a population of 135,160 in 1958. The number of consumers and electricity sold in the Newport district was:

Year	1956	1957	1958
Number of consumers	40,108	41,103	41,923
Electricity sold MWh	381.468	385.845	420,562

In 1958 the number of units sold to categories of consumers was:

Type of consumer	No. of consumers	Electricity sold MWh
Domestic	37,345	53,940
Farms	311	1,451
Commercial	3,869	22,556
Industrial	393	340,515
Public lighting	5	2,100
Traction	0	0
Total	41,923	420,562

== Closure ==
Newport power station was decommissioned in the late 1970s. Some of the power station buildings were converted for commercial use and the area has been redeveloped with residential and commercial premises.

== See also ==
- Timeline of the UK electricity supply industry
- List of power stations in Wales
- Newport Corporation Tramways
