= Dolgelley power station =

Power Station

Coordinates: 52°44′12″N 3°52′35″W

Dolgelley or Dolgellau power station was a combined diesel and hydroelectric generating station. It provided electricity to the town of Dolgellau, Gwynedd, Wales and the surrounding district from 1936 until the 1960s.

== History ==
Dolgellau Urban District Council constructed a combined diesel engine and water-turbine electricity generating plant at Frongoch Dolgellau. In 1936–7 the Electricity Commissioners had authorised the Council to obtain a loan of £4,979 for building work, the purchase of plant, the installation of mains, and the provision of customers’ meters. Upon the nationalisation of the British electricity supply industry in 1948 the Dolgellau power station was vested in the British Electricity Authority. The power station was decommissioned in the 1960s.

== Power station owners ==
The owners and operators of the power station over its operational life were: Dolgellau Urban District Council (1935–48), British Electricity Authority](1948–55), Central Electricity Authority (1955–57), Central Electricity Generating Board (1958–70).

== Plant and equipment ==
The plant at Dolgellau power station comprised:

- One 66 kW Brush diesel engine set
- One 29 kW Gilkes-Gordon water turbine set
- One 53 kW Gilkes-Gordon water turbine set

The total generating capacity was 148 kW, the generating sets operated at 400 V alternating current.

== Operations ==
The operating conditions and electricity output of Dolgellau power station were:

Dolgellau power station operating parameters 1946–67
Year	Running hours	Plant capacity kW	Electricity sent out MWh	Load factor per cent	Thermal efficiency per cent
1946	–	–	288.6	–	–
1954	6157	148	637	69.9	–
1955	6706	148	682	68.8	–
1956	4682	148	441	63.6	–
1957	4118	148	346	56.8	–
1958	6657	148	476	48.3	–
1961	–	82 hydro + 66 diesel	211	16.3	28.14
1962	–	82 + 66	278	21.5	28.72
1963	–	82 + 66	242	27.63	27.86
1967	–	82 + 66	432	33.6	28.02

== See also ==
- Timeline of the UK electricity supply industry
- List of power stations in Wales
- Hydroelectricity in the United Kingdom
