= Accrington brick =

Type of construction brick

Coordinates: 53°46′09″N 2°21′33″W

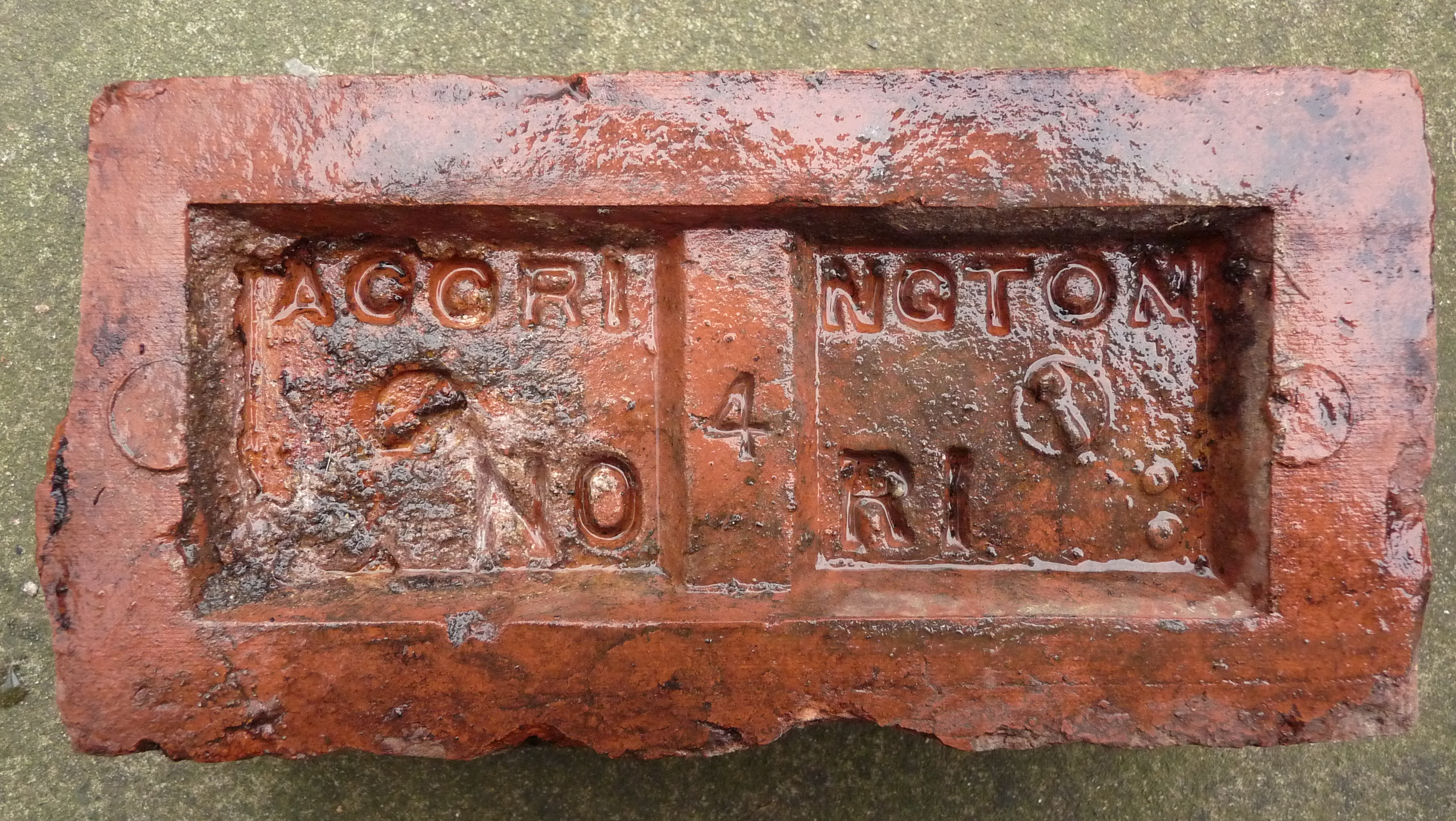
An Accrington brick

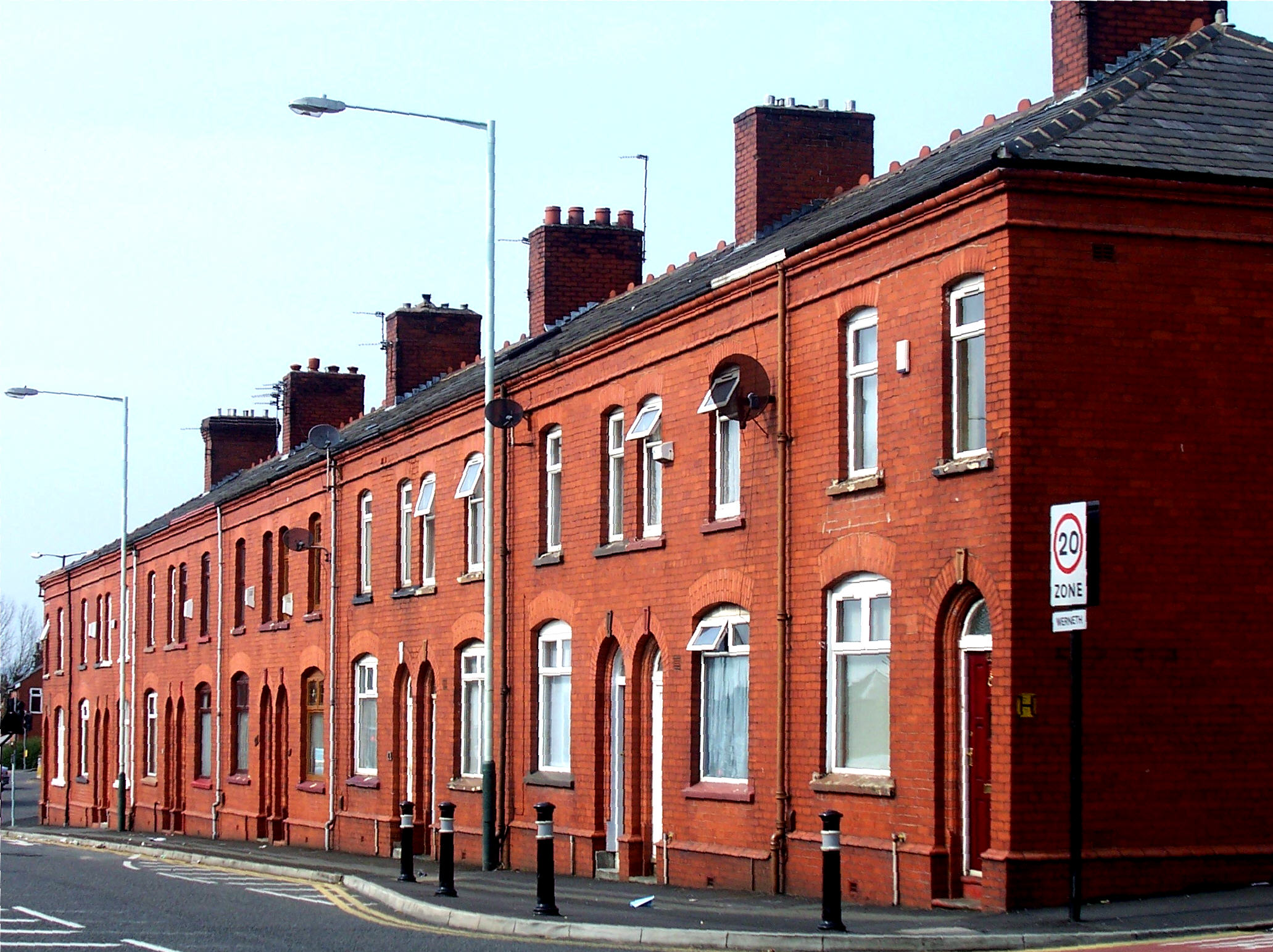
Houses on Fredrick Street, Werneth, Oldham built from Accrington bricks

Accrington bricks, or Nori, are a type of iron-hard engineering brick, produced in Altham near Accrington, Lancashire, England from 1887 to 2008 and again from 2015. They were famed for their strength, and were used for the foundations of the Blackpool Tower and the Empire State Building.

== Name ==
Three theories have been proposed for the name "Nori":

- Iron was written on the chimney of the brickworks, but backwards with the I at the bottom
- The letters IRON were accidentally placed backwards in the brick moulds thus spelling NORI. This is by far the most common story.
- It was a deliberate decision of the owners to differentiate them from the REDAC brick works in Huncoat, standing for Accrington Red.

== Geology ==
Fireclay is often found close to coal seams and the Accrington area had many collieries. At the end of the Ice Age, the River Calder was blocked and formed a large lake in the Accrington area. The sediment from this lake produced the fireclay seams and local coal was available to fire it.

== History ==
The Nori was first produced at a brickworks adjacent to the quarry at Whinney Hill, Altham, by the Accrington Brick and Tile Company Ltd. The clay there produced bricks of the highest strength and hardness. These bricks were acid resistant, so could be used for the lining of flues and chimneys.

There were four brickyards, producing engineering bricks (Enfields, Whinney Hills) and specials. Specials were hand thrown into plaster of Paris moulds. They could be extremely decorative. These bricks were used for specialised engineering projects such as in furnaces and for power stations.

The site had its own mineral railway connecting with the East Lancashire Line at Huncoat Station, and was close to the Leeds and Liverpool Canal.

The brickworks once managed by Marshall Clay Products were bought out by Heidelberg Materials UK, a subsidiary of the multi-national HeidelbergCement group, in 2005. The brickworks was closed in 2008, with the loss of 83 jobs. Hanson, who said they were mothballing the factory, cited the recession and standstill in new house builds. The Accrington Nori Brick works was temporarily re-opened in August 2009 only to close again that November, after a lifespan of 122 years. In 2013 the works was for sale. Since 1982 the old quarries have been increasingly used for landfill of domestic waste from the north west region operated by the company SITA UK. In 2013 local residents began legal action against SITA over claims of foul smells coming from the site.

Following an upturn in new house starts Hanson reopened its Claughton Manor plant, near Lancaster, in 2014. This is the first ever example of "de-mothballing" a brickworks. Additional shifts were added at Kirton, Desford and Wilnecote. In May 2014 it was decided to reopen the Accrington factory.

The restart was to be carried out in two stages: the first phase costing £1.4 million started production in January 2015 with the second phase, requiring further investment of around £350,000, due to follow later in 2015. Hanson say the factory has the capacity to produce 45 million bricks a year and the adjoining quarry has between 30 and 40 years' clay reserves. In the first week of production the Conservative Prime Minister David Cameron and his Chancellor of the Exchequer, George Osborne, chose to visit the factory during their election campaign visit to Lancashire.

== Usage ==
- Blackpool Tower
- Barry Power Station
- Battersea Power Station
- University of Birmingham: original Edgbaston buildings. Its distinctive appearance helped popularise the term red brick university.
- Empire State Building
- Fiddlers Ferry Power Station
- Sellafield
- Thiepval Memorial
- The Haçienda
- The Brick Train at Darlington
