= Hydroelectricity in the United Kingdom =

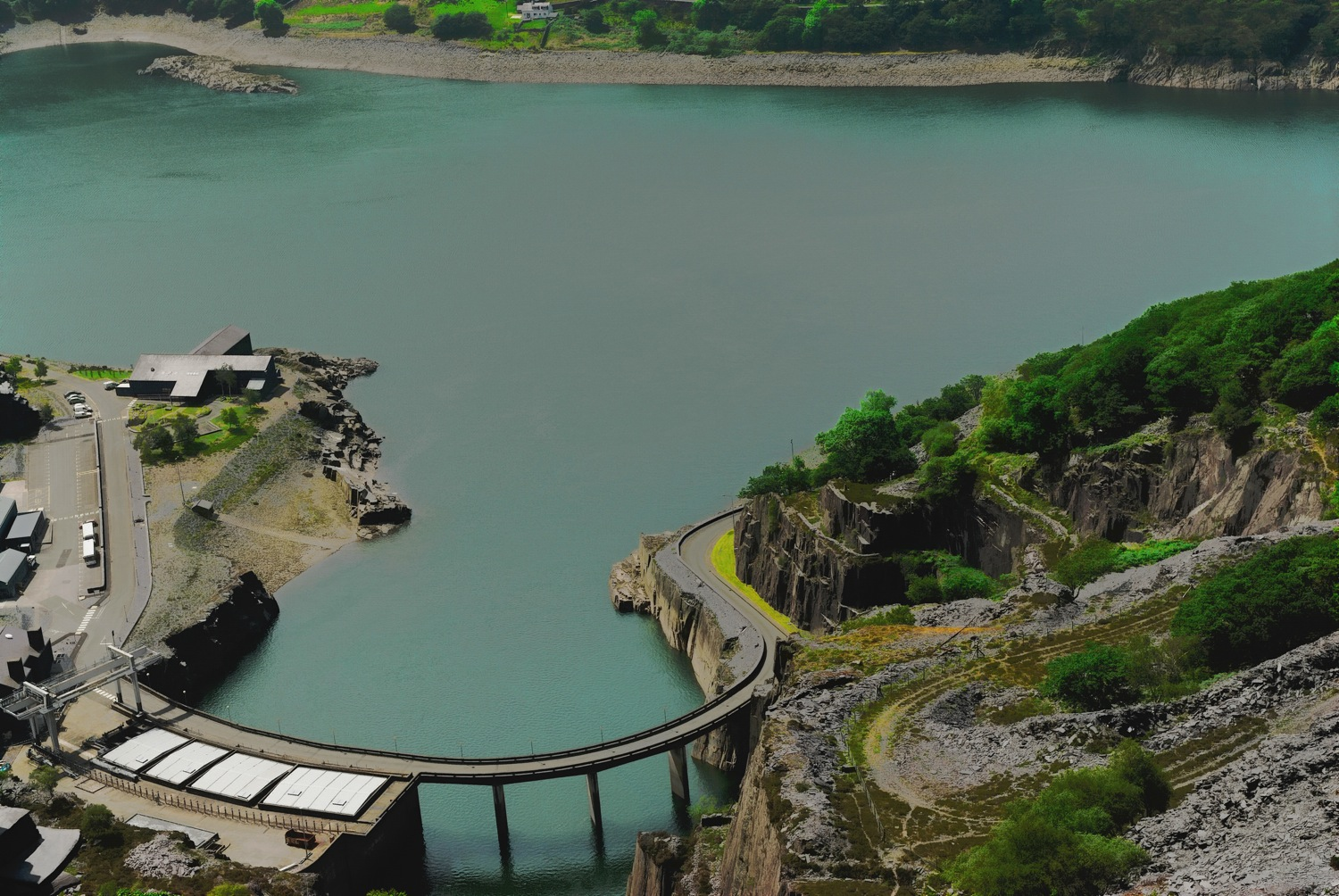
The Dinorwig Power Station lower reservoir, a 1,800 MW pumped-storage hydroelectric scheme, in north Wales, and the largest hydroelectric power station in the UK

Hydroelectricity accounted for 4.2% of electricity generation from renewable sources in the United Kingdom (2018)

As of 2018, hydroelectric power stations in the United Kingdom accounted for 1.87 GW of installed electrical generating capacity, being 2.2% of the UK's total generating capacity and 4.2% of UK's renewable energy generating capacity. This includes four conventional hydroelectric power stations and run-of-river schemes for which annual electricity production is approximately 5,000 GWh, being about 1.3% of the UK's total electricity production. There are also four pumped-storage hydroelectric power stations providing a further 2.8 GW of installed electrical generating capacity, and contributing up to 4,075 GWh of peak demand electricity annually.

The potential for further practical and viable hydroelectricity power stations in the UK is estimated to be in the region of 146 to 248 MW for England and Wales, and up to 2,593 MW for Scotland.

Interest in hydropower in the UK rose in the early 2010s due to UK and EU targets for reductions in carbon emissions and the promotion of renewable energy power generation through commercial incentives such as the Renewable Obligation Certificate scheme (ROCs) and feed-in tariffs (FITs). Before such schemes, studies to assess the available hydro resources in the UK had discounted many sites for reasons of poor economic or technological viability, but studies in 2008 and 2010 by the British Hydro Association (BHA) identified a larger number of viable sites, due to improvements in the available technology and the economics of ROCs and FITSs. However, during the same period there have been significant reductions in costs of other renewable energy sources such as offshore wind and photovoltaics, this has resulted in reduced competitiveness of large scale hydroelectric schemes in the UK. There are no large scale hydroelectric scheme planned in the UK as of 2020. However, it is predicted that pumped storage will play an increasingly important role in the UK electricity grid in future years as more intermittent sources of electricity generation come on line.

Schemes up to 50 kW are eligible for FITs, and schemes over 5 MW are eligible for ROCs. Schemes between 50 kW and 5 MW can choose between either. The UK Government's National Renewable Energy Action Plan of July 2010 envisaged between 40 and 50 MW of new hydropower schemes being installed annually up to 2020. The most recent feedback for new hydro schemes is for 2009, and only about 15 MW of new hydropower was installed during that year.

== Statistics for UK hydroelectric schemes ==
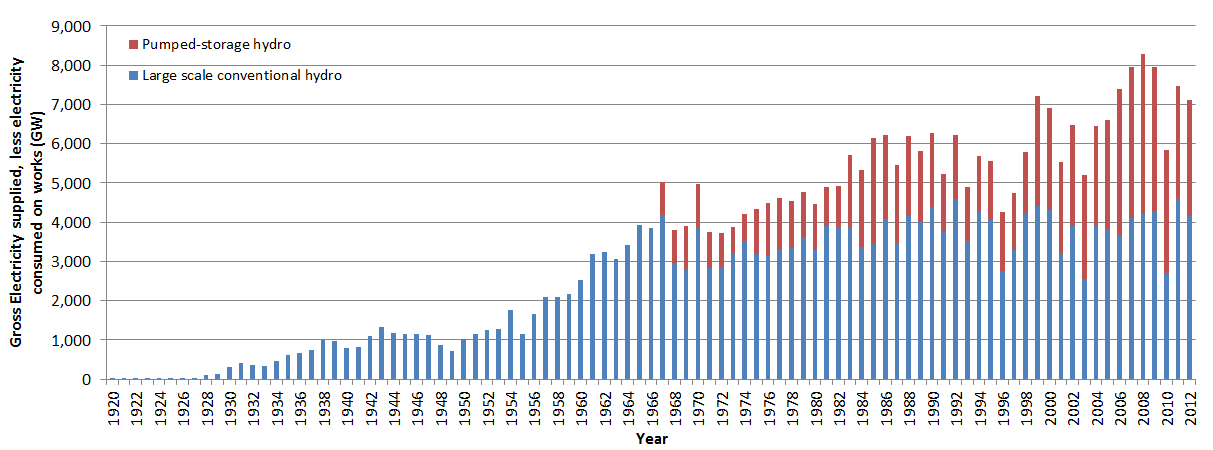
United Kingdom gross electricity supplied from Hydro between 1920 and 2012 (GWh), including for pumped-storage schemes

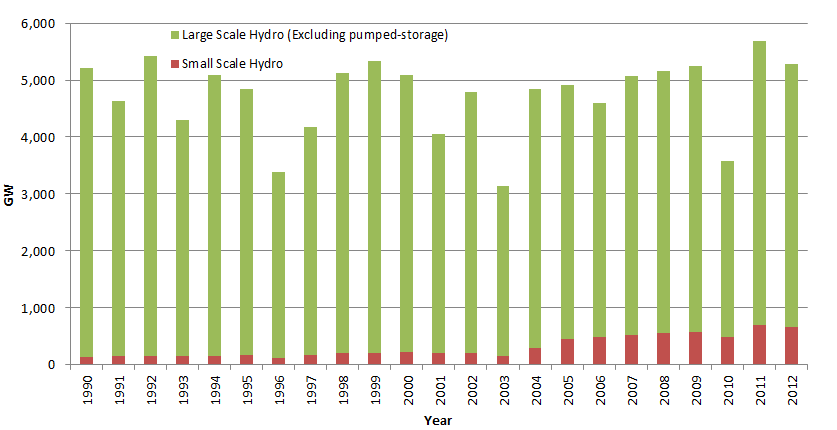
United Kingdom annual electricity generation from hydroelectricity between 1990 and 2012 (GW hours), excluding pumped-storage schemes

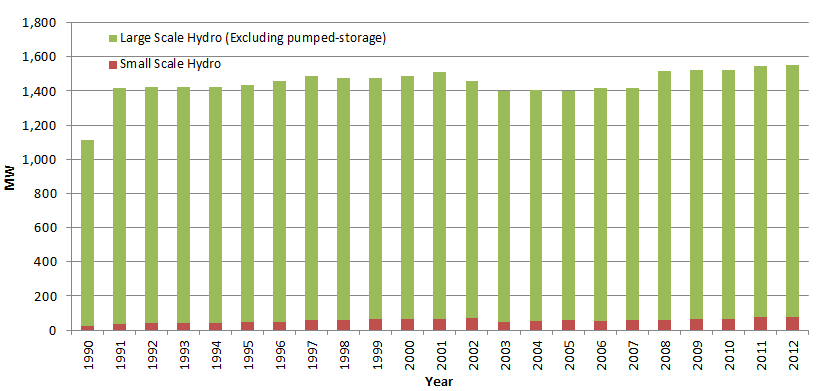
United Kingdom net installed hydroelectricity capacity between 1990 and 2012 (MW), excluding pumped-storage schemes

== List of UK hydroelectric schemes over 1 megawatt ==
Name	Operator	Location	Capacity (kW)	Notes
Clachan	SSE Renewables	Argyll, Scotland	40,000	
Cruachan Dam	Drax Group	Argyll, Scotland	440,000	Pumped-storage
Dinorwig Power Station	First Hydro Company	Gwynedd, Wales	1,728,000	Pumped-storage
Errochty	SSE Renewables	Scotland	75,000	
Ffestiniog Power Station	First Hydro Company	Gwynedd, Wales	360,000	Pumped Storage
Glendoe Hydro Scheme	SSE Renewables	Inverness-shire, Scotland	100,000	600 m hydraulic head (largest in the UK)
Glenlee	Drax Group	Scotland	24,000	
Glenmoriston	SSE Renewables	Highland, Scotland	37,000	
Inverawe	SSE Renewables	Argyll, Scotland	25,000	
Kendoon	Drax Group	Scotland	24,000	
Lochaber	Alcan Primary Metals - Europe	Highland, Scotland	84,000	
Maentwrog	Nuclear Decommissioning Authority	Gwynedd, Wales	30,000	
Rannoch	SSE Renewables	Scotland	48,000	
Rheidol	Statkraft	Ceredigion, Wales	56,000	3 dams: Dinas 13.5 MW, Cwm Rheidol 41 MW + 1 MW
Sloy	SSE Renewables	Argyll, Scotland	160,000	Plans for conversion to pumped storage unveiled in May 2023
Tongland	Drax Group	Scotland	33,000	
Tummel	SSE Renewables	Scotland	34,000	
Aigas	SSE Renewables	Inverness-shire, Scotland	20,000	
Bonnington	Drax Group	Scotland	11,000	
Carsfad	Drax Group	Kirkcudbrightshire, Scotland	12,000	
Cashlie	SSE Renewables	Perthshire, Scotland	11,000	
Cassley	SSE Renewables	Sutherland, Scotland	10,000	
Ceannacroc Power Station	SSE Renewables	Inverness-shire, Scotland	20,000	
Culligran Unit 2	SSE Renewables	Inverness-shire, Scotland	17,100	
Dinas Power Station	Stratkraft	Ceredigion, Wales	13,500	
Dolgarrog High-Head Power Station	Conwy Road	Dolgarrog Power Station, Dolgarrog, Nr Conwy, Wales	18,400	
Dolgarrog Low-Head Power Station	Conwy Road	Dolgarrog Power Station, Dolgarrog, Nr Conwy, Wales	14,980	
Earlstoun	Drax Group	Kirkcudbrightshire, Scotland	14,000	
Finlarig	SSE Renewables	Scotland	16,900	
Grudie Bridge	SSE Renewables	Scotland	18,600	
Invergarry	SSE Renewables	Invergarry, Inverness-shire, Scotland	19,975	
Kilmorack	SSE Renewables	Scotland	20,000	
Kinlochleven Hydro Power Station	Alcan Primary Metal - Europe	Argyll, Scotland	19,500	
Livishie	SSE Renewables	Inverness-Shire, Scotland	17,000	
Mossford	SSE Renewables	Inverness-shire, Scotland	18,600	
Nant	SSE Renewables	Argyll, Scotland	15,000	
Orrin	SSE Renewables	Ross-shire, Scotland	18,000	
Pitlochry	SSE Renewables	Scotland	15,000	
Quoich	SSE Renewables	Tomdoun, By Loch Garry, Nr Fort Augustus, Inverness-shire, Scotland., Scotland	22,000	
Shin	SSE Renewables	Sutherland, Scotland	18,620	
St Fillans	SSE Renewables	Scotland	16,830	
Torr Achilty	SSE Renewables	Ross-shire, Scotland	15,000	
Achanalt	SSE Renewables	Ross-shire, Scotland	3,100	
Allt na Lairige	SSE Renewables	Argyll and Bute, Scotland	6,000	
Ardverikie	Ardverikie Estates Ltd	Inverness-shire, Scotland	1,100	
Beeston Weir	Novera Energy	Nottinghamshire, England	1,676	largest run-of-river scheme in England
Black Rock	Npower Renewables	Highland, Scotland	3,000	
Braevallich Hydro Station	Npower Renewables	Argyll, Scotland	2,274	
Broken Cross Muir Hydro	The Scottish Coal Company Ltd	Scotland	1,000	
Callop	Broadland properties	Scotland	1,087	
Carnoch	Npower Renewables	Scotland	1,350	
Chliostair Power Station	SSE Renewables	Harris, Hebrides, Scotland	1,320	
Chonais	SSE Renewables	Highland, Scotland	3,500	
Cuaich	SSE Renewables	Inverness-shire, Scotland	2,500	
Cuileig Power Station	SSE Renewables	Wester Ross, Scotland	3,300	
Culligran Comp Set	SSE Renewables	Inverness-shire, Scotland	2,000	
CWM Rheidol Hydro Dam	Stratkraft	Ceredigion, Wales	1,000	
Dalchonzie	SSE Renewables	Scotland	4,000	
Deanie	SSE Renewables	Highland, Scotland	3,800	
Douglas Water Power Station	Npower Renewables	Argyll, Scotland	3,000	
Drumjohn Power Station	Drax Group	Dumfries and Galloway, Scotland	2,200	
East Aberchalder	Npower Renewables	Inverness-shire, Scotland	3,500	
Elan Valley	Novera Energy	Powys, Wales	3,113	
Eredine Hydro Project	NPower renewables	Argyll and Bute, Scotland	2,500	
Falls Of Unich	Npower Renewables	Angus, Scotland	6,000	
Fasnakyle	SSE Renewables	Inverness-Shire, Scotland	7,701	
Foyers Falls	SSE Renewables	Inverness-shire, Scotland	5,036	
Foyers	SSE Renewables	Inverness-shire, Scotland	300,000	Pumped-storage
Franklaw Hydro at Franklaw Water Treatment	United Utilities PLC	Perth & Kinross, Scotland	1,000	
Garrogie Power Station	Npower Renewables	Inverness-shire, Scotland	2,400	
Gaur	SSE Renewables	Perthshire, Scotland	7,900	
Glenn Dubh Hydro	Npower Renewables	Highland, Scotland	3,000	
Inverar Hydro	Npower Renewables	Perth & Kinross, Scotland	1,100	
Inver broom	Norgen (Ffestiniog) Ltd	Highland, Scotland	3,170	
Inverfarigaig	GreenPower	Inverness-shire, Scotland	4,000	
Inverlael	Npower Renewables	Scotland	1,250	
Kerry Falls	SSE Renewables	Highland, Scotland	1,250	
Kielder Power Station	Northumbrian Water Ltd	England	5,500	largest conventional hydro in England
Kilmelfort	SSE Renewables	Argyll, Scotland	2,500	
Kingairloch Hydro	SSE Renewables	Inverness-shire, Scotland	3,500	
Lairg	SSE Renewables	Sutherland, Scotland	3,500	
Lednock	SSE Renewables	Scotland	3,000	
Lochay	SSE Renewables	Scotland	47,000	
Little Loch Roag	SSE Renewables	Scotland	1,000	
Llyn Brianne	Novera Energy	Carmarthenshire, Wales	4,600	
Llyn Celyn	Novera Energy	Wales	4,507	
Loch Dubh	SSE Renewables	Wester Ross, Scotland	1,200	
Loch Eilde Mor	Hydro Plan (for Alcan)	Highland, Scotland	7,000	
Loch Ericht Power Station	SSE Renewables	perthshire, Scotland	2,200	
Loch Gair	SSE Renewables	Argyll, Scotland	6,000	
Loch Turret WTW	Scottish Water	Perth & Kinross, Scotland	1,950	
Lochay Compensation Generator	SSE Renewables	Perthshire, Scotland	2,000	
Lochiel Estate	Highland Light and Power Ltd	Highland, Scotland	1,315	
Lubreoch	SSE Renewables	Scotland	5,000	
Lussa	SSE Renewables	Argyll, Scotland	2,400	
Maldie Burn	Npower Renewables	Highland, Scotland	2,000	
Mary Tavy Power Station	South West Water Ltd	Devon, England	2,600	
Mucomir	SSE Renewables	Highland, Scotland	2,000	
Mullardoch Tunnel	SSE Renewables	Inverness-shire, Scotland	2,400	
Nostie Bridge	SSE Renewables	Ross-shire, Scotland	1,300	
River E Power Station	Npower Renewables	Inverness-shire, Scotland	3,000	
Siadar	wavegen / Npower Renewables	Scotland	3,000	
Sron Mor	SSE Renewables	Argyll, Scotland	5,000	
Stonebyres Power Station	Drax Group	Lanarkshire, Scotland	6,000	
Storr Lochs	SSE Renewables	Isle of Skye, Scotland	2,400	
Striven	SSE Renewables	Argyll, Scotland	8,000	
Trossachs	SSE Renewables	Stirlingshire, Scotland	2,500	
Urlar Hydro	Bolfracks Estate	Perth & Kinross, Scotland	1,400	
Victoria Falls Station	CRF Hydropower	Argyll, Scotland	1,120	
Wimett Station	Highland Light & Power	Devon, England	1,430	

== See also ==
Related Lists

- List of power stations in Scotland#Hydro-electric
- List of power stations in England#Hydroelectric power
- List of power stations in Wales#Hydro-electric
- List of conventional hydroelectric power stations
- List of pumped-storage hydroelectric power stations

Related UK pages

- Energy policy of the United Kingdom
- Energy use and conservation in the United Kingdom
- Geothermal power in the United Kingdom
- Green electricity in the United Kingdom
- Renewable energy in Scotland
- Renewable energy in the United Kingdom
- Scottish Hydro Electric
- Solar power in the United Kingdom
- Wind power in the United Kingdom

Other related

- Environmental impact of wind power
- Friends of the Earth
- Renewable energy by country
- Relative cost of electricity generated by different sources
- Renewable Electricity and the Grid
- Renewable energy in the European Union
- United Kingdom National Renewable Energy Action Plan

== Bibliography ==
- Payne, Peter L. (1988). The Hydro. Aberdeen University Press. ISBN 978-0-08-036584-8.
