= North Wales Hydro Electric Power Act 1973 =

- Act of Parliament
- Parliament of the United Kingdom
- Long title: An Act to confer powers upon the Central Electricity Generating Board for the construction and erection of works and a generating station in the county of Caernarvon and for the acquisition of lands and easements for the purposes thereof or in connection therewith; and for other purposes.
- Citation: 1973 c. xxxvi

Dates
- Royal assent: 19 December 1973

Text of statute as originally enacted

The North Wales Hydro Electric Power Act 1973 (c. xxxvi) is an act of the Parliament of the United Kingdom which gave powers to the Central Electricity Generating Board (CEGB) to build the hydro electric station at Dinorwig in North Wales and associated purposes.

== Background ==
The Central Electricity Generating Board (CEGB) had a statutory duty to develop and maintain an electricity supply in England and Wales. In order to meet increasing demand for electricity there was a need to construct and operate new works for generating electricity. This act gave powers to the CEGB to build the hydro electric station at Dinorwig in North Wales.

== North Wales Hydro Electric Power Act 1973 ==
The North Wales Hydro Electric Power Act 1973 received royal assent on 19 December 1973. Its long title is ‘An Act to confer powers upon the Central Electricity Generating Board for the construction and erection of works and a generating station in the county of Caernarvon and for the acquisition of lands and easements for the purposes thereof or in connection therewith; and for other purposes.’

=== Provisions ===
The act comprises 58 sections in five parts, and five schedules:

Part I : Preliminary

- Sections 1 to 6, short title, interpretation, application

Part II: Works

- Sections 7 to 20, powers, roads, footpaths, accommodation

Part III: Lands

- Sections 21 to 28, acquisitions, easements

Part IV: Abstractions, impoundings and discharges

- Sections 29 to 46, powers to take water, abstraction, discharges

Part V: Miscellaneous and general

- Sections 47 to 58, preservation, protection, arbitration, costs

Schedules

- Schedule 1 – Part I and Part II Provisions of Water Act 1945
- Schedule 2 – Lands for possession
- Schedule 3 – Footpaths to be stopped up
- Schedule 4 – Description of land for generating station
- Schedule 5 – Land acquired for accommodation

== Effects of the act ==
The act empowered the CEGB to construct hydro electric generating station at Dinorwig. Construction took place from 1974 to 1984, the first generator came on line in February 1983. The generating plant comprises six 290 MW generators with a total net capability of 1728 MW.

== Current status ==
Unknown.

== See also ==
- Timeline of the UK electricity supply industry
- North Wales Hydro-Electric Power Act 1952
- North Wales Hydro-Electric Power Act 1955
