= Gisla Hydro-Electric Scheme =

Power station on Lewis, Outer Hebrides, Scotland

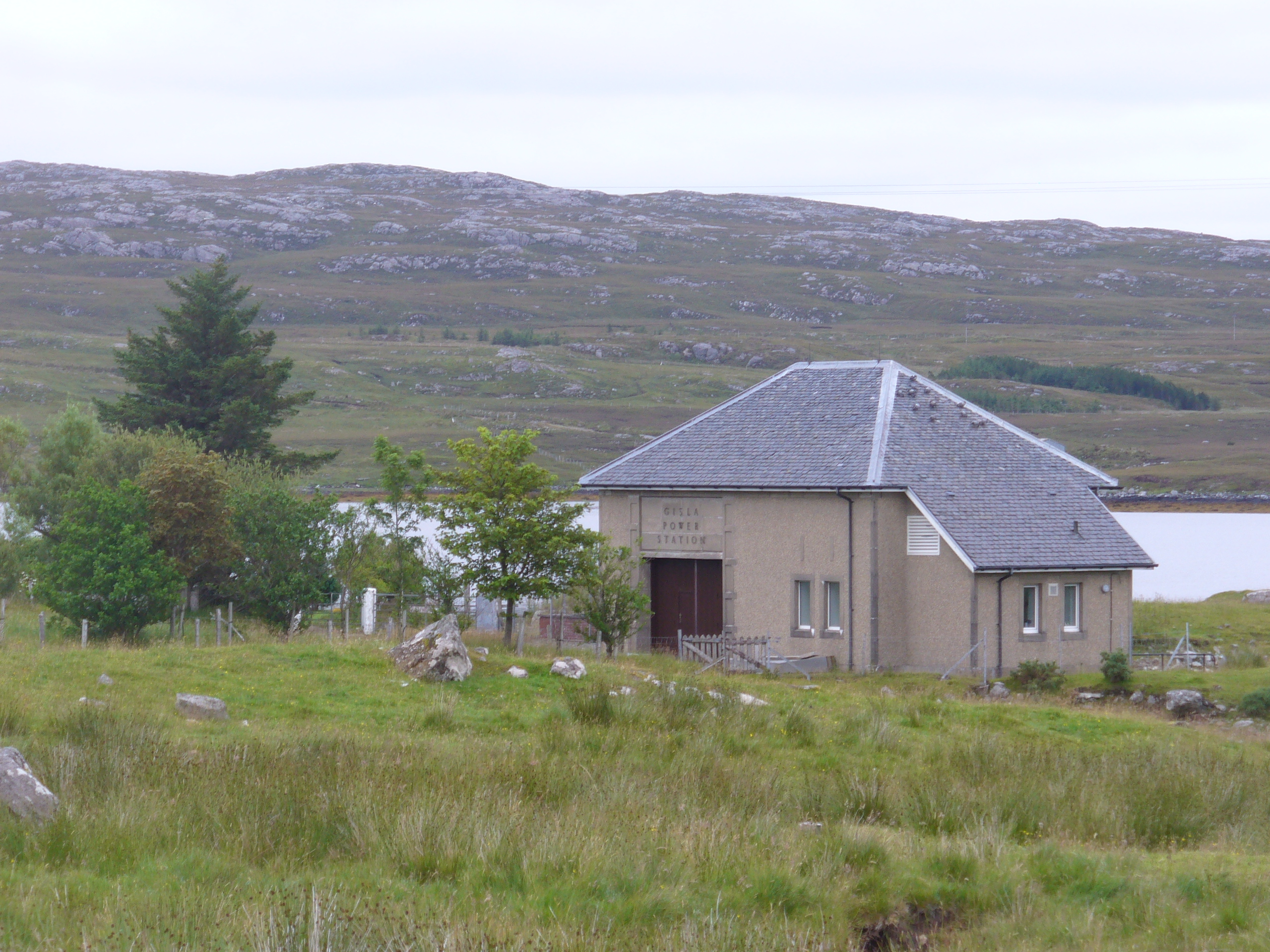
- The turbine house of Gisla power station is on the banks of Loch Ròg Beag

- Location within Scotland
- Country: Scotland
- Location: Isle of Lewis
- Coordinates: 58.1279°N 6.8782°W
- Purpose: Power
- Status: Operational
- Opening date: 1960
- Owner: SSE

Gisla Hydro-Electric Scheme is a small scheme promoted by the North of Scotland Hydro-Electric Board on the Isle of Lewis, Outer Hebrides, Scotland. It consists of a single power station powered with water from Loch Coirceabhat, and was commissioned in 1960.

== History ==
The North of Scotland Hydro-Electric Board was created by the Hydro-electric Development (Scotland) Act 1943, a measure championed by the politician Tom Johnston while he was Secretary of State for Scotland. Johnston's vision was for a public body that could build hydro-electric stations throughout the Highlands. Profits made by selling bulk electricity to the Scottish lowlands would be used to fund "the economic development and social improvement of the North of Scotland." Private consumers would be offered a supply of cheap electricity, and their connection to that supply would not reflect the actual cost of its provision in remote and sparsely populated areas.

The chairman of the new Board was to be Lord Airlie, who had initially been critical of the 1943 Act because its scope was too limited. The deputy chairman and chief executive was Edward MacColl, an engineer with wide experience of hydro-electric projects and electrical distribution networks. It soon became clear that MacColl intended to push ahead with the aspirations of the Act at breakneck speeds. He produced a list of 102 potential sites in just three months, and in June 1944, the first constructional scheme was published. This was for the Loch Sloy scheme, which had a ready market for bulk supplies to nearby Clydeside, but it included two smaller schemes, to demonstrate the Board's commitment to supplying remote areas.

The Gisla scheme was another of the smaller schemes designed to serve remote areas, and was constructional scheme number 34. Johnston wanted to show that the most remote parts of the Board's area would be served, and drove the scheme through its planning stages, despite advice that it would be much better to spend the money on more mainstream projects. Together with the neighbouring Chliostair Hydro-Electric Scheme on Harris, Outer Hebrides, which was built at a similar time, it would bring clean energy to the remote communities on Lewis and Harris, removing their reliance on diesel generators. The estimated cost at the time the scheme was confirmed by the Secretary of State for Scotland was £210,000, but it would be several years before construction began. The cost per kW installed was slightly less than for Chliostair, but the remoteness of Lewis and Harris meant that the cost was among the highest of the projects built by the North of Scotland Hydro-Electric Board. The costs were estimates, as no work had begun at the time they were quoted.

The scheme involved building a dam across the Abhainn Giosla, about 0.6 miles (1 km) west of Loch Ròg Beag, near the hamlet of Giosla. As the water level rose, it created Loch Coirceabhat, joining Loch More Coirgavat and Loch Beg Coirgavat. A pipeline carries water from the reservoir to the turbine house, located between the shore of Loch Ròg Beag (Little Loch Roag) and the B8011 road. Water descends by 154 feet (47 m) from the reservoir to the turbine house and the installed capacity was probably 0.54 MW although OFGEM now quote it as 0.72 MW. The scheme was commissioned in 1960, and produced around 2 GWh of power per year. By 1969, it was operating at a load factor of 42 percent, indicating that it supplied the base load for the communities it served, while the neighbouring Chliostair Hydro-Electric Scheme on North Harris, also completed in 1960, operated at a load factor of 27 percent, indicating that it was used to supply additional power at times of peak demand. Both stations are now fully integrated into the National Grid.

=== Operation ===
In 2002, the Renewables Obligation (Scotland) legislation was introduced. It was conceived as a way to promote the development of small-scale hydro-electric, wave power, tidal power, photovoltaics, wind power and biomas schemes, but by the time it came into force, the definition of small scale had been increased from 5 MW to 10 MW and then 20 MW, and existing hydro-electric stations that had been refurbished to improve efficiency could be included. Gisla at 0.7 MW thus qualified, and between 2002 and 2007 the station qualified for 12,301 Renewable Obligation Certificates, generating a subsidy for SSE of around £584,000. Between 2003 and 2007, the station operated at an average load factor of 38.8 percent.

== Hydrology ==
The pipeline to the turbine house is fed from Loch Coirceabhat, which also supplies compensation water to the Abhainn Giosla. Prior to construction of the dam, the Amhuinn Tharsuinn brought the outflow from Loch More Coirgavat southwards to the Abhainn Giosla, but that is now covered by the larger Loch Coirceabhat. The raised water level has also meant that Loch Beg Coirgavat is part of the same body of water. The new loch covers 91 acres (37 ha) and drains an area of 3,826 acres (1,548 ha). Its surface level is 48 metres (157 ft) above Ordnance datum (AOD). Additional water is supplied from the south by Loch Mòr Ruadh and Loch Beag Ruadh. From the north, a number of small lochs feed into Loch Coirceabhat, including Loch Airigh an Uisge, Dubh Loch, another Loch Mòr Ruadh and Loch na Craobhaige Mòire.

The Abhainn Giosla continues to the west, and is fed by the small Loch na Ciste, which is connected to the much larger Loch Gruineabhat. Although its surface level was 365.9 feet (111.5 m) AOD in 1895, its surface level is now 377 feet (115 m). It covers an area of 389 acres (157 ha) and drains an area of 1,979 acres (801 ha). The change in level has occurred because a small dam has been constructed across the river at the outlet of Loch na Ciste.

== Bibliography ==
- Dekker, Nick (2008). "Public Petition No. PE1184" (PDF). Scottish Parliament. Archived (PDF) from the original on 10 January 2024.
- Fleetwood, David (2010). McDowell, Dawn (ed.). Power to the People: the built heritage of Scotland's hydroelectric power. Historic Scotland. ISBN 978-1-84917-036-9.
- Lea, K J (March 1969). "Hydro-Electric Power Generation in the Highlands of Scotland". Transactions of the Institute of British Geographers (46): 155–165. doi:10.2307/621414. JSTOR 621414.
- Miller, James (2002). The Dam Builders - Power from the Glens. Birlinn. ISBN 978-1-84158-225-2.
- Payne, Peter L (1988). The Hydro. Aberdeen University Press. ISBN 978-0-08-036584-8.
- Swap (June 2005). "Subsidies and Subterfuge" (PDF). Scottish Wind Assessment Project. Archived (PDF) from the original on 11 October 2022.
- Wood, Emma (2002). The Hydro Boys. Luath Press. ISBN 978-1-84282-016-2.
