= North Wales Hydro-Electric Power Act 1952 =

- Act of Parliament
- Parliament of the United Kingdom
- Long title: An Act to confer further powers upon the British Electricity Authority for the construction of works in the counties of Caernarvon and Merioneth and for the acquisition of lands and easements for the purposes thereof or in connection therewith and for other purposes.
- Citation: 15 & 16 Geo. 6. & 1 Eliz. 2. c. xlvi

Dates
- Royal assent: 1 August 1952

Status: Current legislation

Text of statute as originally enacted

The North Wales Hydro-Electric Power Act 1952 (15 & 16 Geo. 6. & 1 Eliz. 2. c. xlvi) is an act of the Parliament of the United Kingdom which gave powers to the British Electricity Authority (BEA) to extend the hydro-electric stations at Dolgarrog and Maentwrog in North Wales and associated purposes.

== Background ==
Dolgarrog hydro-electric power station had originally built in 1907 to generate electricity for an aluminium smelting plant. Public supplies of electricity began in 1922. A new station (known as No. 2 station) was built in 1924–5. By 1952 the electricity industry had been nationalized and the BEA sought powers to extend Dolgarrog power station to increase its generating capacity and output.

Maentwrog hydro-electric power station had first been commissioned in October 1928. In 1952 the BEA sought powers, alongside those for Dolgarrog, to extend the power station.

== North Wales Hydro-Electric Power Act 1952 ==
The North Wales Hydro-Electric Power Act 1952 received royal assent on 1 August 1952. Its long title is 'An Act to confer powers upon the British Electricity Authority for the construction of works in the counties of Caernarvon and Merioneth and for the acquisition of lands and easements for the purposes thereof or in connection therewith and for other purposes.'

=== Provisions ===
The act comprised 41 sections

- Section 1 Short title
- Section 2 Incorporation of Acts
- Section 3 Interpretation
- Section 4 Power to execute works
- Section 5 Power to deviate
- Section 6 Subsidiary works
- Section 7 Works to form part of undertaking
- Section 8 Power to dredge etc.
- Section 9 Temporary stoppage of roads and footpaths
- Section 10 Period for completion of works
- Section 11 Discharge of water into streams
- Section 12 Accommodation for workmen employed on construction of works
- Section 13 Power to take water
- Section 14 Obligation to secure full development of water power
- Section 15 Restriction on taking water in respect of Dolgarrog extension works
- Section 16 Restriction on taking water in respect of Maentwrog extension works
- Section 17 Provisions applicable to last two preceding sections of Act
- Section 18 Agreements with statutory water undertakers and others
- Section 19 Making good diminution in water supplies used for domestic or agricultural purposes
- Section 20 Further provisions relating to Work No. 1
- Section 21 Fencing and crossing of aqueducts
- Section 22 Application and modification of Public Utilities Street Works Act 1950
- Section 23 For the preservation of scenery and amenities
- Section 24 Power to acquire lands
- Section 25 Correction of errors in deposited plans and book of reference
- Section 26 Acquisition of part only of certain properties
- Section 27 Power to expedite entry
- Section 28 Power to enter for survey of valuation
- Section 29 Disregard of recent improvements and interests
- Section 30 Extinction of private rights of way
- Section 31 Power to acquire easements only
- Section 32 Grant of easements by persons under disability
- Section 33 Liability to make compensation
- Section 34 Payment to river board for improvement of fishery
- Section 35 For protection of Postmaster-General
- Section 36 For protection of river board
- Section 37 Saving for Llandudno Urban District Council
- Section 38 Saving for town and country planning
- Section 39 Arbitration
- Section 40 Crown rights
- Section 41 Costs of Act

== Effects of the act ==
The act empowered the BEA to extend the catchment areas of Dolgarrog and Maentwrog power stations, and to build a 10 MW extension to Dolgarrog.

Dolgarrog No. 3 Station was commissioned in 1957. It comprised a 10 MW, 750 rpm, Boving-Bruce Peebles water turbine set. The capacity of the power station increased from 17.7 MW prior to 1957 to 27.7 MW from 1957.

== See also ==
- Timeline of the UK electricity supply industry
- North Wales Hydro-Electric Power Act 1955
- North Wales Hydro Electric Power Act 1973
