= North Wales Hydro-Electric Power Act 1955 =

- Act of Parliament
- Parliament of the United Kingdom
- Long title: An Act to confer powers upon the Central Electricity Authority for the construction and erection of works and generating stations in the counties of Merioneth Cardigan and Montgomery and for the acquisition of lands and easements for the purposes thereof or in connection therewith and for other purposes.
- Citation: 4 & 5 Eliz. 2. c. xxv

Dates
- Royal assent: 27 July 1955

Text of statute as originally enacted

The North Wales Hydro-Electric Power Act 1955 (4 & 5 Eliz. 2. c. xxv) is an act of the Parliament of the United Kingdom which gave powers to the Central Electricity Authority (CEA) to build the hydro-electric stations at Ffestiniog and Rheidol in North Wales and associated purposes.

== Background ==
The Central Electricity Authority had a statutory duty to develop and maintain an electricity supply in England and Wales. In order to meet increasing demand for electricity there was a need to construct and operate new works for generating electricity. This act gave powers to the CEA to build the hydro-electric stations at Ffestiniog and Rheidol in North Wales

== North Wales Hydro-Electric Power Act 1955 ==
The North Wales Hydro-Electric Power Act 1955 received royal assent on 27 July 1955. Its long title is ‘An Act to confer powers upon the Central Electricity Authority for the construction and erection of works and generating stations in the counties of Merioneth, Cardigan and Montgomery and for the acquisition of lands and easements for the purposes thereof or in connection therewith and for other purposes.’

=== Provisions ===
The act comprises 52 sections

- Section 1 Short title
- Section 2 Incorporation of Acts
- Section 3 Interpretation
- Section 4 Power to execute works
- Section 5 As to construction of Works Nos 2 and 20
- Section 6 Power to deviate
- Section 7 Subsidiary works
- Section 8 Construction of fish ladders
- Section 9 Diversion of footpaths and stopping up of highways
- Section 10 Works to form part of undertaking
- Section 11 Power to dredge etc.
- Section 12 Temporary stoppage of roads and footpaths
- Section 13 Period for completion of works
- Section 14 Discharge of water into streams
- Section 15 Accommodation for workmen employed on construction of works
- Section 16 Power to take and use water
- Section 17 Compensation water in respect of Ffestiniog works
- Section 18 Compensation water in respect of Rheidol works
- Section 19 Restriction on taking water in respect of Rheidol works
- Section 20 Provisions applicable to last three preceding sections of Act
- Section 21 Agreements with statutory water undertakers and others
- Section 22 Making good diminution in water supplies used for domestic or agricultural purposes
- Section 23 Laying of pipes for affording or making good water supplies
- Section 24 Agreements with Aberystwyth Corporation
- Section 25 Fencing and crossing of aqueducts
- Section 26 For the preservation of scenery and amenities
- Section 27 For prevention of pollution
- Section 28 Removal of submerged buildings and trees
- Section 29 Power to acquire lands and construct generating stations
- Section 30 Correction of errors in deposited plans and book of reference
- Section 31 Acquisition of part only of certain properties
- Section 32 Power to expedite entry
- Section 33 Power to enter for survey of valuation
- Section 34 Disregard of recent improvements and interests
- Section 35 Extinction of private rights of way
- Section 36 Power to acquire easements only
- Section 37 Grant of easements by persons under disability
- Section 38 Liability to make compensation
- Section 39 Removal of human remains
- Sections 40 to 47 Protection of various organisations
- Section 48 Service of notices to treat
- Section 49 Saving for town and country planning
- Section 50 Arbitration
- Section 51 Crown rights
- Section 52 Costs of Act

Table of Statutes referred to in this Act

== Effects of the act ==
The act empowered the CEA to construct hydro-electric generating stations at Ffestiniog and Rheidol. By 1962 when both power stations had been commissioned, Ffestiniog had an installed capacity of 150 MW and generated 30.26 MWh in 1962, Rheidol had a capacity of 37 MW and generated 155.56 MWh that year.

== Current status ==
Unknown.

== See also ==
- Timeline of the UK electricity supply industry
- North Wales Hydro-Electric Power Act 1952
- North Wales Hydro Electric Power Act 1973
