= Chliostair Hydro-Electric Scheme =

Power station on Harris, Outer Hebrides, Scotland

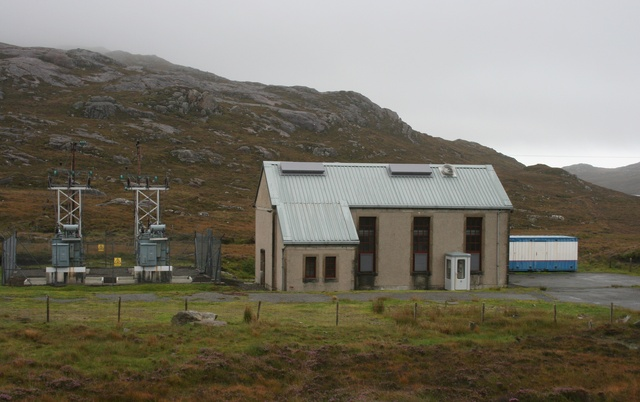
- The turbine house of Chliostair power station

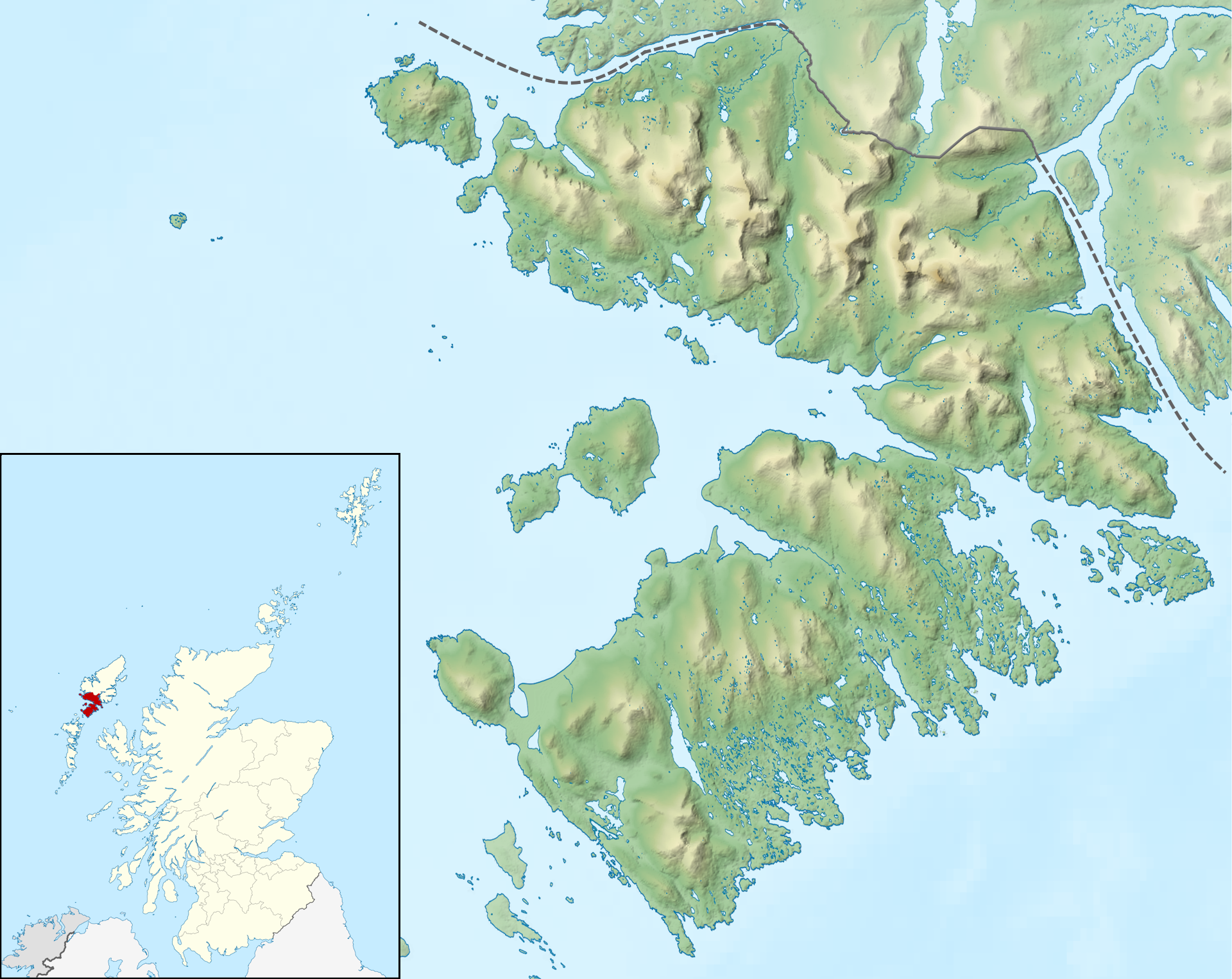
- Location within Harris
- Interactive map of Chliostair; Hydro-Electric Scheme
- Country: Scotland
- Location: Harris, Outer Hebrides
- Coordinates: 57.9740°N 6.9748°W
- Purpose: Power
- Status: Operational
- Opening date: 1960
- Owner: SSE

Chliostair Hydro-Electric Scheme is a small scheme promoted by the North of Scotland Hydro-Electric Board on Harris, Outer Hebrides. It consists of a single power station powered with water from Loch Chliostair, and was commissioned in 1960.

== History ==
The North of Scotland Hydro-Electric Board was created by the Hydro-electric Development (Scotland) Act 1943, a measure championed by the politician Tom Johnston while he was Secretary of State for Scotland. Johnston's vision was for a public body that could build hydro-electric stations throughout the Highlands. Profits made by selling bulk electricity to the Scottish lowlands would be used to fund "the economic development and social improvement of the North of Scotland." Private consumers would be offered a supply of cheap electricity, and their connection to that supply would not reflect the actual cost of its provision in remote and sparsely populated areas.

The chairman of the new Board was to be Lord Airlie, who had initially been critical of the 1943 Act because its scope was too limited. The deputy chairman and chief executive was Edward MacColl, an engineer with wide experience of hydro-electric projects and electrical distribution networks. It soon became clear that MacColl intended to push ahead with the aspirations of the Act at breakneck speeds. He produced a list of 102 potential sites in just three months, and in June 1944, the first constructional scheme was published. This was for the Loch Sloy scheme, which had a ready market for bulk supplies to nearby Clydeside, but it included two smaller schemes, to demonstrate the Board's commitment to supplying remote areas.

The Chliostair scheme was constructional scheme number 35, and it would bring clean energy to the remote communities on Harris, removing their reliance on diesel generators. The cost of building the scheme was estimated at £270,000 in 1955. Because of its remoteness, the capital cost per kW installed was among the highest for the schemes promoted by the board, although at the time of Lord Strathclyde's answer in the House of Lords, work had not started on the project, and so the cost he quoted was only an estimate. However, work had started by March 1959. Johnston faced tough opposition to the scheme, from those who thought it would be much better to spend the money on more mainstream projects, but he insisted that it should proceed, as it showed that the Board would not neglect the remote communities which were within its area.

The scheme would use the water from Loch Chliostair, the level of which would be raised by the construction of a small dam at its southern end. A surface pipeline running broadly parallel to the Abhainn Eabhal would carry the water to the turbine house located just to the north of Loch Leòsaid, some 1.25 miles (2.0 km) north-east of the hamlet of Amhuinnsuidhe. It has the capacity to generate 1 MW of power from a hydraulic head of 410 feet (125 m), and was commissioned in 1960. By 1969, the station was producing an average of 2.4 GWh of electricity per year, and was operating at a load factor of 27 percent, indicating that it was being used to top up the power available at peak periods. The neighbouring Gisla Hydro-Electric Scheme on the Isle of Lewis, also commissioned in 1960, operated at a load factor of 42 percent, indicating that it was supplying the base load demands of the communities that both stations served. Upgrades to the scheme have since increased its capacity to 1.32 MW, and both schemes are now fully integrated into the National Grid.

The dam at Loch Chliostair was designed by L H Dickerson and his staff, and was the first arch dam constructed in Britain. While the construction of the larger schemes by the North of Scotland Hydro-Electric Board is well documented, there is much less information available for the small schemes. Two men who lived in North Harris and who were involved in the project were Calum MacLellan and Kenny MacKay. MacLellan provided vehicles on loan to the Board for the duration of the build, and MacKay was involved in constructing the pipeline. They recall that around 80 men lived and worked on the site for over a year.

=== Operation ===
In 2002, the Renewables Obligation (Scotland) legislation was introduced. It was conceived as a way to promote the development of small-scale hydro-electric, wave power, tidal power, photovoltaics, wind power and biomas schemes, but by the time it came into force, the definition of small scale had been increased from 5 MW to 10 MW and then 20 MW, and existing hydro-electric stations that had been refurbished to improve efficiency could be included. Chliostair at 1.3 MW thus qualified, and between 2004 and 2007 the station qualified for 13,917 Renewable Obligation Certificates, generating a subsidy for SSE of nearly £654,000. Between 2005 and 2007, the station operated at an average load factor of 34.3 percent.

== Hydrology ==
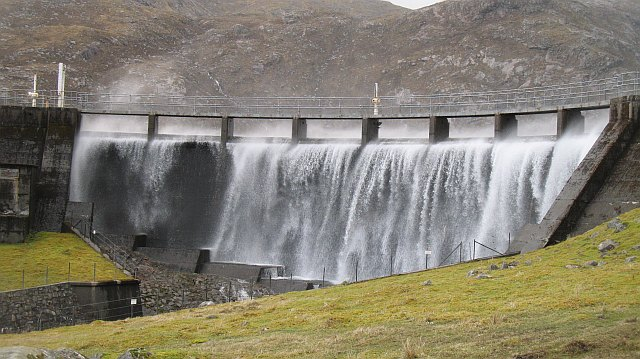
Chliostair dam was the first arch dam to be built in Britain

The power station draws its water from Loch Chliostair, but this is fed by water from two other lochs. Loch Aiseabhat is the most northerly. It drains the saddle between the hills of Sròn Uladail and Ulabhal to the east, and the foothills of Tiòrga Mor to the west. The surface level of the loch is 778 feet (237 m) above Ordnance datum (AOD), it covers 20 acres (8 ha), and drains an area of 440 acres (180 ha). A short stream around 0.3 miles (0.5 km) long connects it to Loch Chliostair. Other streams from the east and west enter the loch at its northern end, and towards its southern end, it a joined by water flowing from Loch Maolaig, a corrie on the south-eastern slopes of Tiòrga Mor. It has a surface area of 12 acres (5 ha), drains an area of 136 acres (55 ha) and its surface is at 1,109 feet (338 m) AOD. The surface of Loch Chliostair was noted as 532.4 feet (162.3 m) AOD on 27 July 1875, but it is now 538 feet (164 m) AOD as a result of the dam. It covers and area of 74 acres (30 ha) and drains 2.07 square miles (5.36 km^{2}).

From the dam at the southern end of Loch Chliostair, the Abhainn Eabhal runs in a south-westerly direction to flow into Loch Leòsaid. The pipeline for the power station runs alongside it, on its right bank. The tailrace flows into the final short section of the Abhainn Eabhal. Loch Leòsaid has a surface area of 74 acres (30 ha), drains 6.68 square miles (17.3 km^{2}) and its surface is 135 feet (41 m) AOD. It is this descent that provides the head for the turbines. From Loch Leòsaid, water flows over some weirs into the Abhainn Mhòr, through two small lochs which are collectively known as Lochan Beag, although they are at different levels with weirs between them. It passes over another weir at the lower end of Lochan Beag, is crossed by a bridge carrying the B887 road, and flows over more weirs before entering the sea at Loch Leosavay, close to the hamlet of Amhuinnsuidhe.

== Bibliography ==
- Dekker, Nick (2008). "Public Petition No. PE1184" (PDF). Scottish Parliament. Archived (PDF) from the original on 10 January 2024.
- Fleetwood, David (2010). McDowell, Dawn (ed.). Power to the People: the built heritage of Scotland's hydroelectric power. Historic Scotland. ISBN 978-1-84917-036-9.
- Lea, K J (March 1969). "Hydro-Electric Power Generation in the Highlands of Scotland". Transactions of the Institute of British Geographers. 46: 155–165. doi:10.2307/621414. JSTOR 621414.
- Miller, James (2002). The Dam Builders - Power from the Glens. Birlinn. ISBN 978-1-84158-225-2.
- Payne, Peter L (1988). The Hydro. Aberdeen University Press. ISBN 978-0-08-036584-8.
- Swap (June 2005). "Subsidies and Subterfuge" (PDF). Scottish Wind Assessment Project. Archived (PDF) from the original on 11 October 2022.
- Wood, Emma (2002). The Hydro Boys. Luath Press. ISBN 978-1-84282-016-2.
