= Beeston Hydro =

Small hydroelectric scheme, in Beeston, Nottinghamshire

Coordinates: 52°54′44″N 1°12′24″W

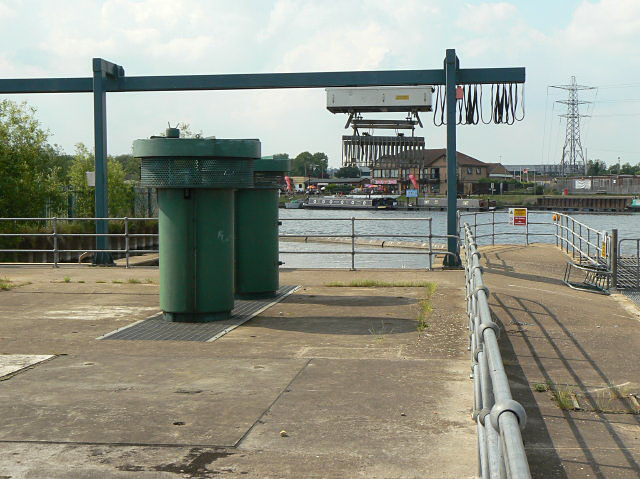
Beeston Hydro on the River Trent

Beeston Hydro is a small hydroelectric scheme, in Beeston, Nottinghamshire. It is located on the River Trent, and generates up to 1.66 MW of electricity.

== History ==
During 1999, Hyder Industrial Ltd. built the UK's largest "run-of river" hydro-electric plant at Beeston Rylands Weir. The plant was commissioned on 4 January 2000 and later sold on to United Utilities in 2001.

== Description ==
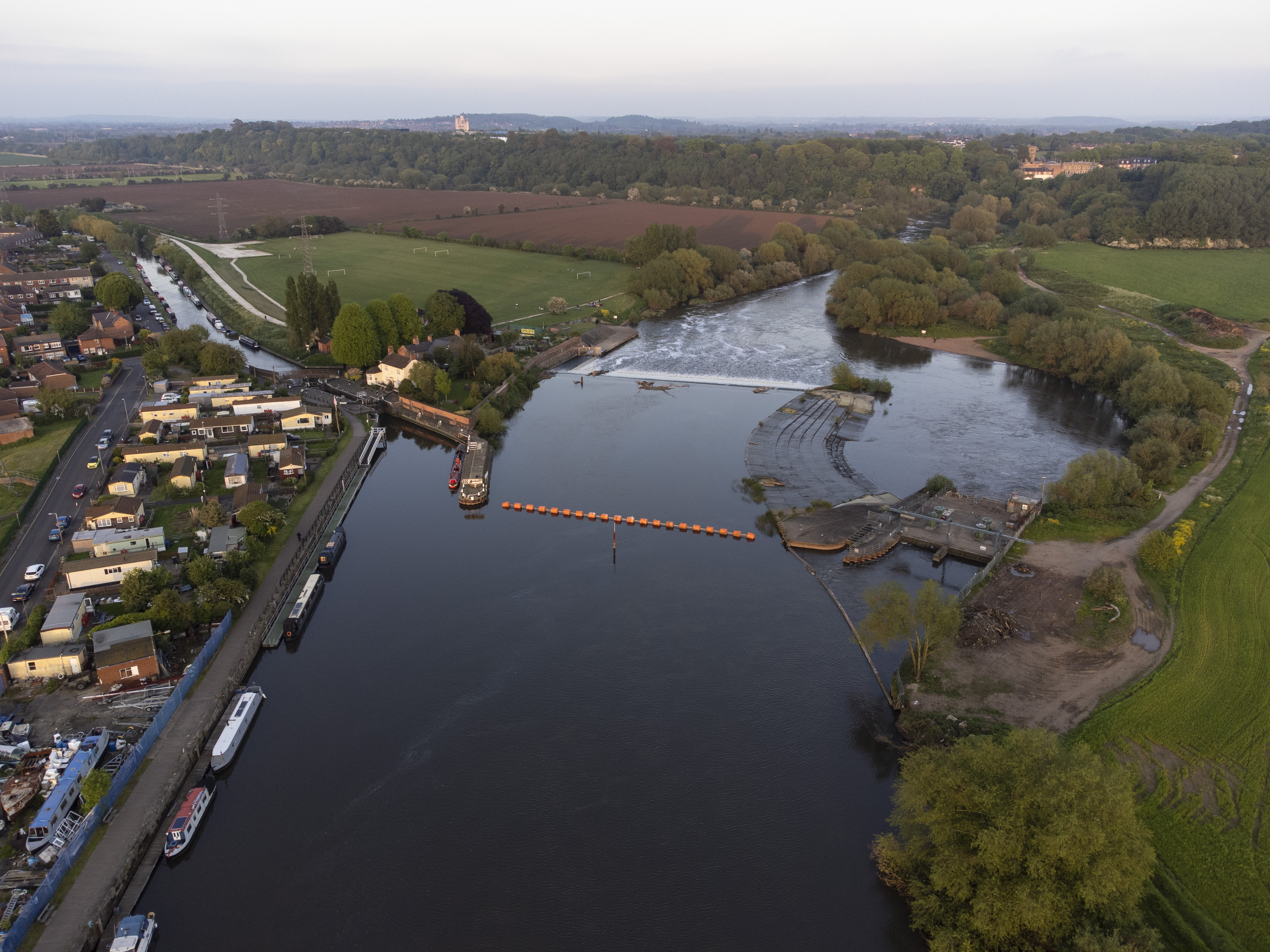
Aerial photograph of Beeston Hydro and Beeston Weir

The plant has a design life of twenty years. At the maximum consented flow rate, 60 m^{3}/s of water passes through the pair of turbines. Upstream of the weir and during the salmon migratory period, the plant utilises a bio-acoustic fish-fence—a bubble curtain in which the bubbles contain a sound that the fish do not like. This fish fence steers migrating fish away from the fast-flowing turbine intakes and into the fish ladder, by which the fish can safely negotiate the weir. The power generated supplies enough electricity (1.5 MW–1.66 MW) for two thousand homes, a total of 5.26 GWh annually. In 2013 it was run by Infinis and as of 2025 it is operated by H2O Power producing 1.4MW.
