= Carmarthen Bay Power Station =

Former coal-fired power station in Wales

Carmarthen Bay power station
- Country: United Kingdom
- Location: Burry Port, Carmarthenshire
- Coordinates: 51°40′47″N 04°14′35″W
- Status: Decommissioned and demolished
- Construction began: 1947
- Commission date: 1953
- Decommission date: 1984
- Construction cost: £25 million
- Owners: Carmarthen Bay Power Station Company Limited (1946–1948); British Electricity Authority (1948–1955); Central Electricity Authority (1955–1957); Central Electricity Generating Board (1958–1984)
- Operator: As owner
- Employees: 500 (1953), 200 (1984)

Thermal power station
- Primary fuel: Coal
- Turbine technology: Steam turbines
- Site area: 89 hectare
- Chimneys: 3
- Cooling towers: none

Power generation
- Units operational: 2 × 52.5 MW, 4 × 60 MW
- Make and model: Metropolitan Vickers
- Units decommissioned: All
- Nameplate capacity: 345 MW
- Annual net output: 588.3 GWh (1971)

Carmarthen Bay Power Station was an electricity power plant on the north shore of the Burry estuary in Wales in operation from 1953 to 1984.

== History ==
Carmarthen Bay power station was planned by the Carmarthen Bay Power Station Company Limited in 1946. The site was selected for the availability of coal from the Gwendraeth Valley and the supply of seawater for condensing steam in the plant. The site covered an area of 220 acres (89 hectares) and was partly in the Urban District of Burry Port and partly in the parish of Pembrey in the Rural District of Llanelli.

In December 1946 the Carmarthen Bay Power Station Company applied to the Electricity Commissioners for consent to build the new power station. The proposed station was in the electricity supply area of the Llanelly and District Electric Supply Company Limited defined under the Llanelly Electricity (Extension) Order 1928. The commissioners gave consent in early 1947.

Construction work on the site began in April 1947 when the 'first sod' was cut by Councillor F. J. Morgan of Burry Port Urban District Council. The building comprised three boiler houses, a turbine hall, control room, transformers and electrical switchgear. It was a steel-framed, brick clad building and used 11.5 million bricks. There were three prominent chimneys. To the north of the station were railway sidings for the delivery of coal, and to the east were setting lagoons for ash from the station.

Upon nationalisation of the British electricity supply industry in 1948 the ownership of Carmarthen Bay power station, then still under construction, was vested in the British Electricity Authority, and subsequently the Central Electricity Authority and the Central Electricity Generating Board (CEGB).

== Specification ==
The power station had 15 boilers by Babcock and Wilcox The boilers operated on pulverised coal and had a combined capacity to supply 3,780,000 kg per hour of steam at 900 psi (62.1 bar) and 482 °C.

There were six turbo-alternators by Metropolitan Vickers, generating at 11.8 kV. Two of the alternators were rated at 52.5 MW and four were rated at 60 MW. The total electricity capacity was 345 Megawatts. The station was built and equipped in three sections: the first section had a capacity of 105 MW from the 52.5 MW machines; the second and third sections each had 120 MW capacity from two 60 MW sets. The final set was commissioned in December 1956.

Condensing of steam and station cooling was by sea water.

Power was first generated on 28 June 1953. At this time the plant employed around 500 people. The power station was formally opened by Sir Henry Self, the Deputy Chair of the British Electricity Authority on 27 August 1954.

== Operations ==
In 1972 the rating of the turbo-alternators was: four 63 MW turbo-alternators and two 55.5 MW sets giving a gross capacity of 363 MW. The 55.5 MW sets had been decommissioned by 1980 and the 63 MW sets de-rated to 60 MW giving an output of 292.5 MW.

The output, average load and thermal efficiency of the station was as follows:

Carmarthen Bay Power Station operation
Year	1953-4	1954-5	1955-6	1956-7	1957-8	1960-1	1961-2	1962-3	1966-7	1971-2	1978-9	1980-81	1981-2
Electricity output, GWh	367.9	872.1	1466.5	1985.6	2062.1	2314.0	2061.3	1815.9	1710.8	588.3	563.664	384.88	380.2
Thermal efficiency, %	27.77	27.88	27.55	28.44	28.17	27.42	27.66	27.11	26.65	21.68	22.67	22.09	23.16
Average load, %	—	—	—	—	—	77.5	68.8	60.61	57.1	19.6	28.7	19.6	19.4

Station output GWh

The power station was locally referred to as “Car Bay” or “The Bay” but sometimes the full title Carmarthen Bay.

Carmarthen Bay power station ceased generating electricity in 1984, and was demolished in 1991–2.

== Aftermath ==
In 1982 the Carmarthen Bay station area became a CEGB test site for wind turbines.

The pulverised fuel ash from the Carmarthen Bay power station was sent to settling lagoons to the west of the power station. Following the closure of the station that area, now known as Ashpits Pond, became an important habitat and breeding site wetland birds.

The accumulated ash from the station was used for landscaping of the area.

The power station site, and the people who worked there, are commemorated on a memorial plaque.
