= Newport Corporation Tramways =

Tramway operator in Wales

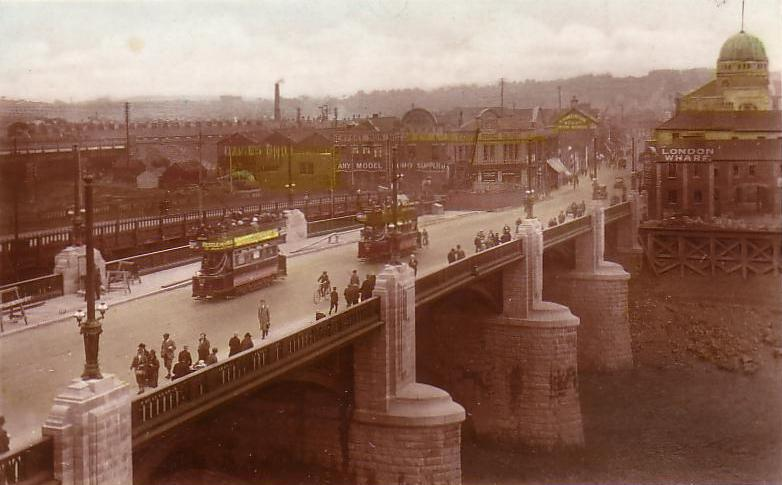
- Trams on Newport Bridge in 1927

Operation
- Locale: Newport
- Open: 9 April 1903
- Close: 5 September 1937
- Status: Closed

Infrastructure
- Track gauge: 3 ft 6 in (1,067 mm)
- Propulsion system: Electric
- Depot: Corporation Road

Statistics
- Route length: 8.55 miles (13.76 km)

Newport Corporation Tramways operated a tramway service in Newport between 1894 and 1937.

== History ==
Newport Corporation took over the Newport Tramways Company on 30 July 1894. The company was then leased back to Solomon Andrews to continue the service.

The first electric services started on 9 April 1903. The trams sported a livery of Maroon and Cream.

== Closure ==
The final tram ran on 5 September 1937.
