= Fife power station =

- Country: Scotland
- Location: Cardenden, Fife
- Coordinates: 56°10′8″N 3°18′22″W
- Decommission date: March 2011
- Owner: Scottish and Southern Energy

Thermal power station
- Primary fuel: Natural gas
- Combined cycle?: Yes

Power generation
- Nameplate capacity: 120 MW

Fife power station was a 120 megawatt gas-fired combined cycle gas turbine generating station at Cardenden in Fife, Scotland.

It was a 1+1 configuration module built around a 74 MW General Electric Frame 6F gas turbine providing for a combined cycle output of 109 MW, exhaust duct firing is employed to reach the stations maximum output.

== History ==
It was formerly the Westfield Development Centre of British Gas. In 1992 Fife Energy bought the site in a £10m deal. A combined-cycle gas turbine plant began commercial operation in January 2001. It was purchased in 2004 by Scottish and Southern Energy (SSE) for £12.3 million, temporarily securing the future of the 10 staff who worked there at the time.

Investigations took place in 2007 into the feasibility of burning used car tyres in Fife, environmental legislations precluded this however.

The plant closed in March 2011.
