= Dolgarrog power station =

Power station in Wales

Dolgarrog Power Station
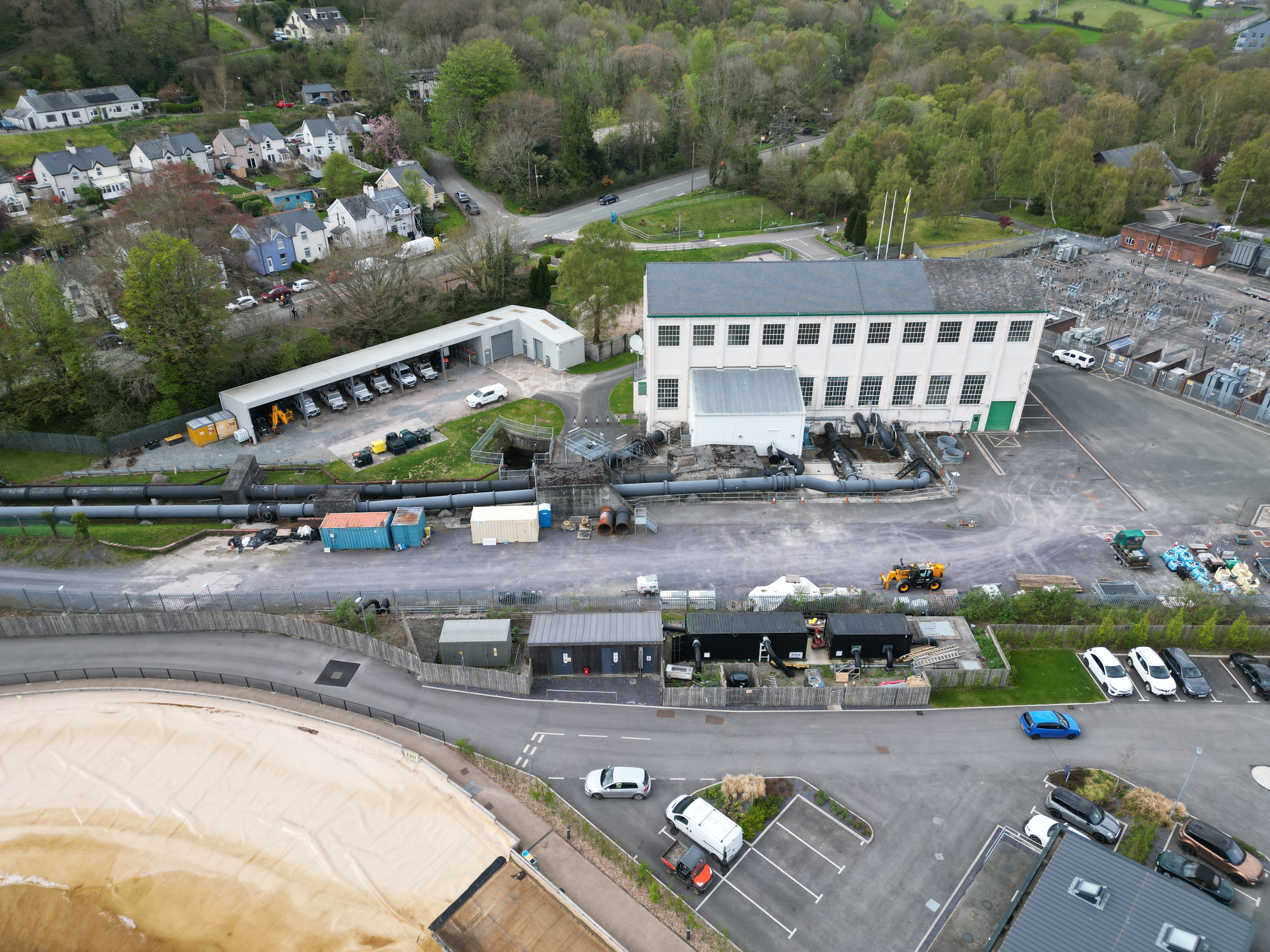
- Country: Wales
- Location: Dolgarrog
- Coordinates: 53°11′28″N 03°50′33″W
- Status: Operational
- Commission date: 1907
- Owners: Aluminium Corporation of Dolgarrog (1907–1920); North Wales Power Company Limited (1920–1948); British Electricity Authority (1948–1955); Central Electricity Authority (1955–1957); Central Electricity Generating Board (1958–1990); National Power (1990–2000); Innogy plc (2000–2002); RWE Innogy (2002–present)
- Operator: As owner

Power generation
- Units operational: 2 × 5 MW; 1 × 6.5 MW; and 1 × 10 MW
- Nameplate capacity: 27 MW
- Annual net output: 74.1 GWh (1958)

Dolgarrog Power Station in Dolgarrog, Wales was originally built in 1907 as part of an aluminium smelting plant. It uses water turbines to drive electricity alternators. Public supplies began in 1922 when power lines were constructed to transmit electricity from the power station to Colwyn Bay, Conwy and Llandudno. The station was vested in the British Electricity Authority and its successors following nationalisation in 1948. It is currently (2025) operated by RWE NPower UK.

== History ==
Dolgarrog hydro-electric power station was commissioned in 1907 by the Aluminium Corporation of Dolgarrog to supply electricity to its adjacent aluminium smelting plant. The smelting of the mineral bauxite to make aluminium is an energy intensive process requiring a large amount of electricity. The availability of cheap hydro-electric power was therefore attractive. The construction of the power station was sanctioned under the provisions of the North Wales Electric Power Act 1904. Water was drawn from Llyn Cowlyd and Llyn Eigiau, via a system of leats and tunnels. There are two 48-inch (1.22 m) diameter pipelines providing a working head of 830 feet (253 m) and 1130 feet (344 m).

The Aluminium Corporation of Dolgarrog acquired a controlling interest in the North Wales Power and Traction Company in 1918. Ownership of the power station was transferred in 1920 to the Power Company which was subsequently renamed the North Wales Power Company Limited. The Power Company also owned and operated the power stations at Cwm Dyli and Maentwrog.

In 1924–25 the North Wales Power Company increased the capacity of the power station by adding two Pelton wheels coupled to 5 MW alternators. This was known as No. 2 station.

In the mid-1930s the Company sought to further expand the power station. The Electricity Commissioners gave consent to the addition of a new 6.5 MW generating set. A new 6-feet (1.83 m) diameter pipe was installed to extend the existing 48-inch (1.22 m) pipe to Cowlyd dam. The North Wales and South Cheshire Joint Electricity Authority (JEA) supported the North Wales Power Bill which increased the share capital of the Power Company to £3 million. Money was therefore available to finance the extension. The power bill was enacted as the North Wales Electric Power Act 1936.

The British electricity supply industry was nationalised in 1948. The North Wales Power Company Limited and the JEA were abolished and ownership of Dolgarrog power station was vested in the British Electricity Authority and its successor organisations. The North Wales Hydro-Electric Power Act 1952 (15 & 16 Geo. 6 and 1 & 2 Eliz. 2. C. cxlvi) provided for the extension of the Dolgarrog and Maentwrog catchment area including a 10 MW extension to the plant at Dolgarrog power station. This was No. 3 Station.

The British electricity supply industry was privatised in 1990. At that time the net capability of Dolgarrog power station was 27 MW from four machines. The station was designated Dolgarrog High-Head power station (18.4 MW) and Dolgarrog Low-Head power station (14.98 MW). Ownership was vested in National Power in 1990 which demerged as Innogy plc in 2000. This was acquired by RWE of Germany in 2002. The station is currently (2020) operated by an Innogy subsidiary Innogy Renewables UK.

== Plant and equipment ==
The power station was developed in stages as outlined above; technical details are as follows.

=== No. 1 station ===
Commissioned in 1909, comprising a Boving Pelton wheel with Bruce Peebles 1.2 MW, 6.6 kV alternator.

=== No. 2 station ===
Commissioned in 1924–25 and comprising 2 Pelton wheels driving 2 × 5 MW AC alternators. In 1936 a third Pelton wheel was installed coupled to a 6.5 MW alternator.

=== No. 3 station ===
Commissioned in 1957, comprising one Boving-Bruce Peebles 10 MW set operating at 750 rpm and with a working head of 750 feet (229 m). There were Ferranti step-up transformers from 6.6 kV to 20 and 33 kV.

=== Plant summary ===
In 1979 the plant at Dolgarrog power station comprised 2 × 5 MW; 1 × 6.5 MW; and 1 × 10 MW turbine & alternator sets giving a net capability of 27 MW. The oldest machine had been installed in 1924.

The generator sets are currently (2020) numbered 2, 3, 4 & 5; all are Francis turbines manufactured by Weir, Weir, Boving & Gilkes respectively, with alternators by GEC-Alsthom (Nos. 2, 3 & 5) and Peebles (No. 4).

== Operations ==
In 1921–23 the electricity statistics for the North Wales Power Company's Dolgarrog power station were:

Dolgarrog power station operating data 1921–23
Year	1921	1922	1923
Electricity generated MWh	6,888	6,487	8,691
Electricity purchased MWh	1,040	2,270	3,248
Electricity sold MWh	7,928	8,757	9,939
Maximum load kW	3,360	4,600	5,000
Total connections kW	7,500	9,000	11,000
Load factor per cent	26.8	21.7	22.6
Revenue from sales	–	£29,563	£34,727
Surplus revenue over expenses	–	£16,010	£17,766

Operating data for the period 1921–86 was:

Dolgarrog power station utilisation and output, 1921–86
Year	Running hours	Max output capacity MW	Electricity supplied MWh	Load factor per cent
1921	–	5.5	1,736	26.8
1922	–	5.5	1,643	21.7
1923	–	5.5	8,459	22.6
1936	–	–	45,434	–
1946 No.1	–	–	43.1	–
1946 No.2	–	21.4	52,400	28.0
1954	8760	17.7	45,959	29.6
1955	8752	17.7	66,246	42.8
1956	8784	17.7	34,203	22.0
1957	8758	27.7	58,136	34.9
1958	7350	27.7	74,103	36.1
1961	–	28	67,260	27.7
1962	–	28	70,984	29.3
1963	–	28	47,551	19.39
1967	–	26.5	61,700	26.2
1972	–	27	39,439	16.9
1979	–	27	58,737	24.8
1982	–	27	65,942	27.9
1986	–	27	64,334	27.3

Output in GWh

The station is currently (2020) operated by Innogy Renewables UK.

== See also ==
- Timeline of the UK electricity supply industry
- List of power stations in Wales
- Hydroelectricity in the United Kingdom
