= King's Lynn Power Station =

Gas power station in Norfolk, England

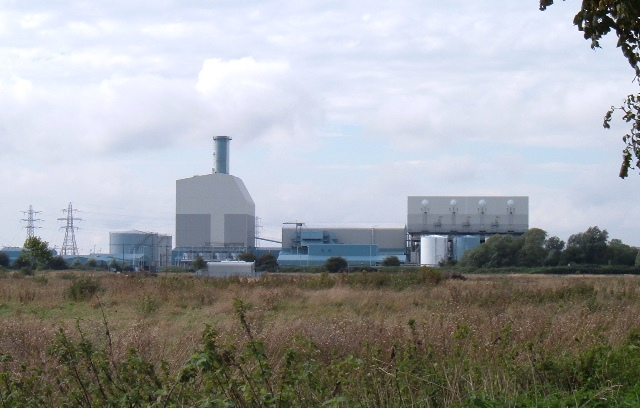
- Country: England
- Location: Norfolk, East of England
- Coordinates: 52.727256°N 0.380117°E
- Commission date: 1997
- Operator: RWE

Thermal power station
- Primary fuel: Natural gas

External links
- Commons: Related media on Commons

King's Lynn Power Station refers to a combined cycle natural gas-powered station near King's Lynn in Norfolk, commissioned in 1997, and now owned by RWE, and to a coal-fired power station in King's Lynn in operation from 1899 to 1960. The CCGT station was mothballed on 1 April 2012. It can generate 325 MW of electricity and employed 40 people. The site was reopened on 19 November 2019.

== History ==
Construction of this power station began in October 1994 and was completed and started producing electricity in December 1997. The owners of the plant, TXU sold the plant to Centrica in October 2001.

The plant was mothballed on 1 April 2012 as older, less efficient, plants such as King's Lynn had become uneconomic due to high gas prices.

In December 2019 RWE purchased the plant from Centrica. The plant joins the UK gas portfolio which is the largest and most efficient fleet in the UK.

== Description ==
The Combined cycle gas turbine power station is located on Willows Business Park, Saddlebow, King's Lynn and uses gas from National Grid's National Transmission System.

=== Original Specification ===
The station was built with one single shaft 237 MW Siemens V94.3 Gas driven Turbine with electrical generator running at 3,000 rpm. The terminal voltage is 21 kV. There is a vertical type triple pressure heat recovery steam generator designed by CMI SA (Belgium)and supplied by CMI SA and International Combustion (since 1997 known as ABB Combustion Services Ltd. The plant has one steam turbine that is coupled to the generator via a self synchronizing clutch. The plant was built with one air cooled condenser which compromises of 61 cooling modules of fins, tubes and fan arranged in four by four configuration, connected to the 132 kV electrical distribution system. The original output of the station was 325 MWe. The power station employs around forty-one staff.

=== Environmental performance ===
In 2006 it generated 900 GWh and emitted the following pollutants:-

- Nitrogen oxides: 310,000 tonnes
- Methane: 26,000 tonnes
- Sulphur Dioxide <100,000 tonnes
- Carbon Monoxide 13 tonnes
- Carbon Dioxide 365,896 tonnes

== King's Lynn B project ==
Centrica has an option to build about 1,000 MW of gas generation capacity near the present site, but has yet to decide if this will go ahead. In 2013 National Grid obtained consent to build a new 400 kV grid connection, but a decision on proceeding is awaited.

== Coal fired power station ==
King’s Lynn power station also refers to a small 5 MW coal-fired power station in Kettlewell Lane in the town centre which operated from 1899 to 1960.

The King’s Lynn Corporation had been granted a Provisional Order under the Electricity Acts to supply electricity to the town in 1896. Supplies of electricity started on 19 August 1899.

By 1921 the plant at the station comprised a 1 MW steam turbine plus two 200 kW and one 400 kW reciprocating engine generators. The station supplied 3-phase 50 Hz AC at 230 and 400 Volts, and 200 and 400 Volt DC. By 1959 the plant comprised one 2.5 MW, one 1.5 MW and one 1.25 MW turbo-alternator sets. Only alternating current was supplied. The station drew its cooling water from the River Gaywood.

The electricity supplied by the station was:

King's Lynn power station output
Year	Electricity supplied (MWh)
1909	524
1910	458
1911	479
1912	500
1913	559
1921	882
1922	837
1923	956
1946	6211
1947	8864
1948	8484
1950	7262
1954	2670
1955	3416
1956	3293
1957	2225
1958	2006

The power station was closed in 1959-60.
