= Rheidol Power Station =

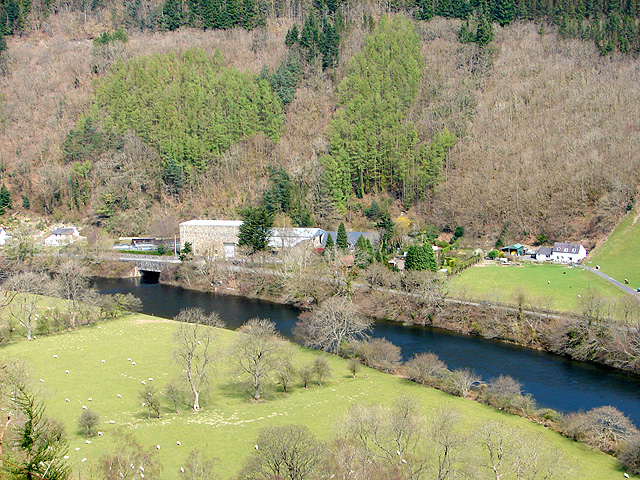
- The main Rheidol power station.

- Location within Wales
- Location: Cwm Rheidol, Wales
- Coordinates: 52.396°N 3.900°W
- Construction began: 1957
- Opening date: 1964
- Construction cost: £10 million

Reservoir
- Creates: Nant-y-Moch, Dinas, Cwm Rheidol
- Catchment area: 162 km2

Power Station
- Turbines: 2 × 20 MW, 1 × 13 MW, 3 × 1 MW
- Installed capacity: 56 MW
- Annual generation: 85 GWh

Rheidol power station is a 56 MW hydroelectric scheme near Aberystwyth, Wales. It was built between 1957 and 1962 and was officially opened on 3 July 1964. It has been operated by Statkraft since 2009 after it was transferred from E.ON UK as part of a swap for shares. In 1964/65 Rheidol Power Station was awarded the Christopher Hinton trophy in recognition of good housekeeping.

The power plant is the largest of its kind in England and Wales. It was constructed under the terms of the North Wales Hydro-Electric Power Act 1955. The plant has generated renewable energy by using rainwater that falls on the surrounding mountains since 1962. The plant covers a total area of 162 square kilometres (63 sq mi) and is made up of an interconnected group of reservoirs, dams, pipelines, aqueducts, and power stations. The upper reaches of the scheme are over 750 metres (2,460 ft) above sea level in the Plynlimon mountains. A series of aqueducts collects the water and channels it into the Nant-y-Moch reservoir. Water flows from this reservoir to a power station at Dinas where it drives a 13 MW generator. From the power station, the water flows into Dinas reservoir. Dinas reservoir supplies water to the largest power station at Cwm Rheidol where there are two 20.5 MW generators. At Cwm Rheidol a further reservoir has been created to avoid large variations in the flow of water. This reservoir collects water that flows through the power station and releases it slowly through a 1 MW generator.
