= Shotton Power Station =

Former power station in Flintshire, Wales

- Country: Wales, United Kingdom
- Location: Flintshire
- Coordinates: 53.23375°N 3.03265°W
- Status: Demolished
- Commission date: 2001
- Decommission date: June 2012
- Owner: GDF Suez

Thermal power station
- Primary fuel: Natural gas

Power generation
- Units operational: 2 x 75 MW; 1 x 60 MW
- Make and model: General Electric
- Nameplate capacity: 210 MW

Shotton Combined Heat and Power Station was a 210 MWe gas-fired CHP power station in Flintshire, Wales. It was located on Weighbridge Road in Deeside, near the A548 in Shotton, Flintshire.

== History ==
The power station opened in 2001 as Shotton CHP Ltd, when owned by TXU Europe. The plant was near the site of UPM's Shotton paper mill and provided steam, condensate and power to the paper mill and fed surplus electricity into the National Grid. It is near steelworks owned by Corus Group. In December 2002, TXU had financial problems when the price of electricity plummeted. The plant went into administration. In January 2003, the administrators, PricewaterhouseCoopers, successfully restarted the power plant. It was the first time a power station had been commercially running whilst in receivership. In October 2003, the plant was bought by Gaz de France (GdF), being their only power station in the UK until the company bought the Teesside Power Station in February 2008. Late 2008 Gaz de France merged with Suez (a major global utility company) to form GDF Suez.

The site was next door to the Deeside Power Station, north of the River Dee. International Power decided to close the plant in June 2012, as the commissioning of a number of highly efficient gas-fired power stations in the UK, the relatively low efficiency of Shotton CHP and the worst position of gas in UK's merit order over the previous years made the plant uncompetitive. It was demolished in 2014.

== Specification ==
It was a CCGT-type power station that runs on natural gas. The plant had two 75 MWe General Electric 6FA gas turbines from which the exhaust gas heats two heat recovery steam generators. The steam from these power one steam turbine.
