= Barry Power Station =

Decommissioned Welsh power plant

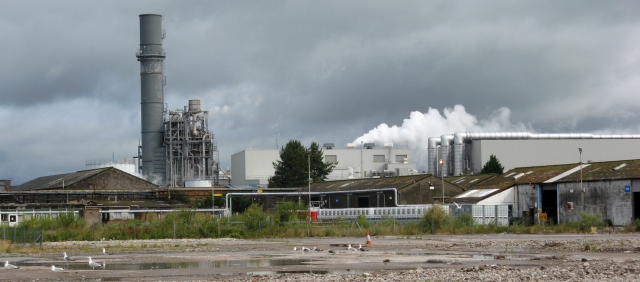
- Barry Power Station
- Country: Wales, United Kingdom
- Location: Sully, Vale of Glamorgan
- Coordinates: 51.408134°N 3.228712°W
- Status: Non-Operational
- Construction began: 1997
- Commission date: 1998
- Decommission date: 2019
- Owner: Centrica
- Operator: Centrica

Thermal power station
- Primary fuel: Natural gas
- Combined cycle?: Yes

Power generation
- Units operational: 1 x 160 MW; 1 x 75 MW
- Make and model: Siemens
- Nameplate capacity: 230 MW

External links
- Commons: Related media on Commons

Barry Power Station was a 230 MWe gas-fired power station on Sully Moors Road in Sully in the Vale of Glamorgan, Wales. It was eight miles west of Cardiff and was situated next to a large Ineos Vinyls chemicals works that makes PVC and a Hexion Chemicals plant.

== History ==
Construction began in January 1997 and it was opened on 7 September 1998, being owned by the AES Corporation but trading as AES Barry Ltd. Until 2000 it ran as a base load station. It was bought by Centrica on 24 July 2003 for £39.7m. AES sold the plant because of the low price of electricity at that time.

The closure of the plant was proposed in Centrica's accounts in February 2012, but the following month a contract was signed to use it to supply peak power. This required a reconfiguration to allow full load to be reached more quickly, and redundancy for a third of the workforce. It was then run in an open-cycle mode, halving operating costs, with the option of switching to combined-cycle mode after an hour. The plant ceased generation on 31 March 2019 and closed on 10 May 2019 with demolition proposed to commence in summer 2019. It was observed that demolition was well underway by July 2019 and by September 2019, the grey steel chimney had been removed, thus a previously well-defined landmark had disappeared.

== Specification ==
It was a CCGT-type power station. There was one 160 MWe Siemens V94.2 gas turbine (built by Ansaldo Energia in Genoa and now called the SGT5-2000E) that fed exhaust gas at 544 °C to a heat recovery steam generator. Steam from this entered a 75 MWe steam turbine running, like the gas turbine, at 3000 rpm. Exhaust steam was passed through an air-cooled condenser and returned to the system as de-aerated feedwater for the HRSG. It connected to the Western Power Distribution section of the National Grid via a substation at 132 kV. The generator on the gas turbine was rated at 180 MVA and had a terminal voltage of 15 kV; the steam turbine's was 11 kV.

The plant was 44% thermally efficient. The chimney was 60 m high.
