= Good Energy =

British energy company

Good Energy Limited
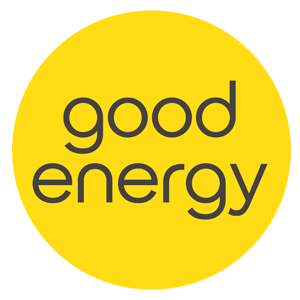
- Type: Private
- Industry: Renewable energy
- Founded: 2003 (as Good Energy)
- Headquarters: Chippenham, Wiltshire, England
- Key people: Nigel Pocklington, CEO
- Products: Renewable energy services
- Revenue: £73.9m (2017) £124.3m (2019)
- Number of employees: 299 (2019)
- Website: www.goodenergy.co.uk

Good Energy Group PLC is a British energy company based in Chippenham, Wiltshire that provides services in the electrification of transport and decentralised renewable energy generation such as domestic solar panels. The company is also an energy retailer, and built a portfolio of wind and solar generation which was sold in 2022. Founded by Juliet Davenport, its CEO is Nigel Pocklington.

On 27 January 2025, it was announced that Dubai based Esyasoft had agreed to purchase Good Energy for £99.4 million.

== History ==
The company was set up in 1997 as Ofex, an offshoot of the German power company Unit Energy Europe. The business was later bought by its management and changed its name to Good Energy in 2003.

In 2012, Good Energy Group was listed on the Alternative Investment Market and raised an additional £4 million of investment.

In 2014, Good Energy bought a £500,000 stake in Tidal Lagoon Power, where Davenport's then-husband Mark Shorrock was the CEO; the company was planning a tidal generation scheme using Swansea Bay. In 2018, the UK government decided not to support the scheme as it was not financially viable. Tidal Lagoon Power Limited entered voluntary insolvency in 2018 and was dissolved in 2024.

In 2015, Good Energy announced it had partnered with energy start-up Open Utility to trial the UK's first renewable energy marketplace, 'Piclo', where generators and consumers buy and sell renewable energy directly at prices they agree on. The six-month trial began in October 2015, and was funded by the DECC Energy Entrepreneurs Fund and Nominet Trust. It was also supported by Ofgem, the energy industry regulator.

As of the end of June 2016, Good Energy supplied 72,250 customers with electricity and 43,000 with gas. The company also administered over 124,500 feed-in tariff generation sites in 2016, making it one of the largest feed-in tariff administrators in the UK.

After announcing reduced profits for 2017, the company stated that it was seeking buyers for the remaining solar and wind sites, and would become a provider of decentralised energy services such as electric vehicle charging and battery storage.

Since June 2020, Good Energy is the controlling (50.1%) shareholder in Next Green Car Ltd, a Bristol-based private company which operates Zap-Map, an electric vehicle charging point mapping platform. Good Energy first bought a minority holding in 2019.

On 1 May 2021, Juliet Davenport stepped down as CEO of Good Energy, and was succeeded by Nigel Pocklington, previously Chief Commercial Officer of Moneysupermarket.com Group. In December 2021, the company called on the government to support energy companies and bill-payers through the energy price crisis.

In May 2023, Ofgem found that Good Energy had charged almost 7,000 customers more than the maximum allowed under the Energy Price Guarantee scheme. The company was required to refund and compensate those customers, the average amount being £109 per customer; and to pay £1.25 million into Ofgem's redress fund for "inadequate systems, processes and repeated inaccurate reporting of information to the regulator over an extended period".

In October 2024, Good Energy bought Amelio Solar for £5.5 million.

=== Takeover offers from Ecotricity ===
In early 2016, 6.8% of the shares of the company were bought by rival energy supplier Ecotricity, making them the second largest shareholder. Ecotricity increased their holding to almost 25% in October 2016. In July 2021, Ecotricity Group made a cash offer for the rest of the shares which implied a value of almost £60 million for the whole company. The offer was rejected by Good Energy on 22 July and the bid lapsed after failing to reach 50% acceptance by shareholders.

Dale Vince, owner of Ecotricity, criticised the company's announcement in November 2021 that it would sell its generation assets, describing it as a break-up of the business.

=== Esyasoft takeover ===
On 27 January 2025, it was announced that Dubai based Esyasoft had agreed to purchase Good Energy for £99.4 million, subject to a shareholder vote. Esyasoft is ultimately controlled by the Abu Dhabi based International Holding Company chaired by Sheikh Tahnoun bin Zayed Al Nahyan, a member of the Abu Dhabi ruling family. Good Energy was 26% owned by British green energy entrepreneur Dale Vince, founder of competitor Ecotricity.

== Generation operations ==
As of June 2017, Good Energy had two wind farms (at Delabole, north Cornwall, and Hampole, South Yorkshire) and eight solar farms.

Delabole wind farm was the first commercial wind farm in the UK. In December 2008, planning approval was granted to Good Energy in order to refurbish (repower) the wind farm. The development was financed by an £11.8 million package including a £9.6 million loan from the Co-operative Bank and £2.2 million equity from Good Energy Group's own resources. In August 2010 the ten original turbines were replaced by four more powerful turbines and in February 2011 Delabole was reopened. In January 2013, Good Energy launched a community tariff offering people living near the wind farm a 20 per cent discount on their energy bills.

In December 2017, the company announced that two solar sites would return to community ownership. In November 2021, during the 2021 natural gas supplier crisis, Good Energy said it would sell its entire 47.5 MW generation portfolio, which had a net book value of £56.8 million and provided around 15% of customers' electricity. The sale to Bluefield Solar Income Fund was completed in January 2022 for £24.5m.

== Lobbying activities ==
Good Energy campaigns for more renewable generation in the UK and was one of the signatories to the 2009 Ofgem guidelines which aimed to clear up confusion over 'green' energy tariffs.

In 2006, Good Energy commissioned Oxford University's Environmental Change Unit to review the green electricity market. Their report put a strong case for an accreditation scheme to advise customers.

Juliet Davenport, CEO of Good Energy, sat on the Renewables Advisory Board until it was abolished in 2010 and, formerly, on the Board of Regen SW, the South West’s renewable energy agency. She sat on Ofgem's Environment and Advisory group and Microgeneration Steering Group.

== Criticism ==
In 2005 an article by The Ecologist magazine noted that Good Energy had not invested directly in constructing new renewable capacity, instead purchasing electricity from third parties: "The reality is that switching to Good Energy has made absolutely no immediate difference to the source of electrons that powered my kettle. My electricity, like everyone else's connected to the UK's national grid, still comes mainly from whatever the closest power station is [...] So what is happening? When a company offers you a '100 per cent green' tariff what it is actually saying is that for every unit of electricity you use it will provide the national grid with the same amount but from a renewable source."

Since then, however, Good Energy upgraded Delabole wind farm, replacing its turbines and increasing its output and seven other generating sites. It also provides support to over 800 independent generators in the UK.

Good Energy validates its claim of supplying 100% renewably generated electricity through the Renewable Energy Guarantee of Origin scheme. It also stated that on its main tariff it retires Renewables Obligation Certificates (ROCs) at an equivalent economic value of 5% above statutory compliance levels that apply to all electricity suppliers.

In 2009 Dale Vince, chief executive of rival company Ecotricity, accused Good Energy of deliberately misleading customers over Renewables Obligation Certificates retirement and called on the National Consumer Council to amend or retract its report. However, Good Energy issued an open letter as a rebuttal, indicating the issue was a fair accounting matter: the company retired additional "ROC financial equivalents" rather than undiscounted ROCs, which was perhaps not well communicated to customers.

In May 2012, Good Energy received criticism for using G4S Utility Services as their meter-reading contractor. Good Energy responded that the relationship was the result of their original contractor Accuread being acquired by G4S in 2008. Due to ethical considerations, Good Energy discontinued their contract with G4S Utility Services and in April 2013 appointed an independent company, Lowri Beck which is part of Calisen plc, as their exclusive contractor to provide meter reading services.

In early 2017, the animal rights group Viva! raised concerns about living conditions for pigs at a farm in Somerset which supplied slurry to a nearby anaerobic digester operated by Wyke Farms, from which Good Energy bought some electricity. The pig farm was reported to have closed in March 2018.

In July 2017 it was alleged that there were "concerning" transactions involving Good Energy and the CEO’s husband, and a "lack of corporate governance".

== See also ==
- Green electricity in the United Kingdom
- Wind power in the United Kingdom
- Energy in the United Kingdom
