= Tidal Lagoon Swansea Bay =

Proposed tidal lagoon power plant in Wales

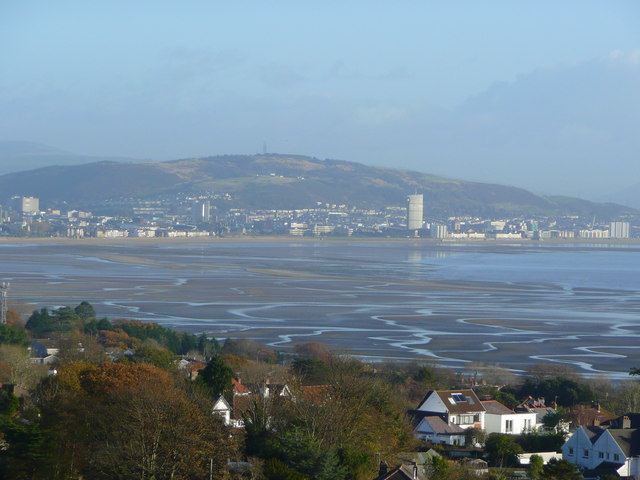
- Country: Wales
- Location: Swansea Bay
- Coordinates: 51.5977°N 3.9064°W
- Status: First proposal rejected by the UK Government
- Construction cost: Proposal estimate £1.3 billion, Blue Eden: multi-billion pound project
- Operator: Tidal Lagoon (Swansea Bay) plc

Tidal power station
- Type: Tidal lagoon

Power generation
- Nameplate capacity: 320 MW

External links
- Website: www.tidallagoonswanseabay.com

Tidal Lagoon Swansea Bay was a proposed tidal lagoon power plant that was to be constructed in Swansea Bay off the south coast of Wales, United Kingdom. Development consent was granted by the UK government in June 2015, and in June 2018 the Welsh Government approved the plan and offered to invest £200 million; however, later that month the UK government withdrew its support on value-for-money grounds. Other options to enable the proposal to go ahead were reportedly still being explored.

If built, the project would have become the world's first tidal lagoon power plant; other types of tidal power plants exist.

== Proposal ==
The scheme is promoted by Tidal Lagoon (Swansea Bay) plc. According to the company, generation could operate 14 hours per day with a maximum output of 320 MW (nameplate capacity), enough to power around 155,000 homes. There are different ways to evaluate tidal energy output. The UK government considered intermittency due to the tides, and concluded that the Tidal Lagoon Swansea Bay would have had a load factor of 19% compared to around 50% for offshore wind power. However, as the monthly variation is predictable, tidal lagoon energy could allow reduction in the amount of energy generated by gas-fired power plants.

During the construction period, the project would have sustained over 2,200 construction and manufacturing jobs, but in operation it would only require 28 workers. The 2016 Hendry Review (the source of these figures) also considered the economic impact of two additional tidal lagoons: "Cardiff could support five times more total direct FTEs than [Swansea Bay] (11,482); Colwyn Bay could support six times more (13,918)".

...just as gas plants and wind farms only create a small number of long-term jobs. The issue here was can we start a new global industry from the UK? Swansea would just be the start. Selective quotes from my Review do not enable us to have a proper debate. (Charles Hendry, 26 June 2018)

The seawalls would be constructed to withstand 500-year-storms and to function as coastline protection against storms and floods.

The project was named as part of the UK Government's 2014 National Infrastructure Plan and was granted development consent by the Department for Energy and Climate Change in June 2015, although the department stated that decisions relating to affordability were a separate matter. In early June 2018, the Welsh Government offered to invest £200 million to improve the project's difficult business case.

On 25 June 2018, the Department for Business, Energy and Industrial Strategy (BEIS) rejected a contract for difference electricity purchasing agreement necessary to fund the £1.3 billion proposal. The main reason given was that there was little cost reduction potential for future lagoons, and a series of lagoons would cost the average electricity consumer an additional £700 by between 2031 and 2050 compared to a mix of offshore wind and nuclear power projects. The value-for-money calculation included the cost of all six of the proposed lagoons in the 35-year cost comparison. A House of Commons briefing paper provided some context for MPs following the conflicting statements and views regarding the facts around tidal lagoons, the Swansea Bay proposal, and its rejection by the UK Government.

The calculations and assumptions made by BEIS which lie behind the rejection of the plan have been challenged by the company behind the proposal in an independently audited riposte which intimates that misleading statements were put to the Parliamentary Joint Select Committee. BEIS responded that the figures used are out of date. The first report by the National Infrastructure Commission published on 11 July 2018 appears to exclude the role of any form of tidal power in the UK's future green energy mix in favour of wind, solar and electric cars, based on a report by Aurora Energy Research looking at the market up to 2050. This states "Offshore wind becomes economical in the 2030s without subsidies, tidal never becomes competitive without government support". The Aurora Energy Research report also states "Amongst renewables, solar PV, onshore wind and offshore wind are the main sources of new renewables to enter economically under a carbon target. Building tidal power requires a subsidy, but the impact on total system cost is minimal". These contrasting perspectives all use different time periods for modelling costs and benefits but a common thread is that a shorter time-frame flatters alternatives to tidal power and a longer time-frame flatters tidal power compared to its alternatives.

=== Proposed design ===
- 9.5 km of seawalls, impounding 11.5 km^{2} of the seabed
- 16 bidirectional turbines
- Each turbine 7.2 m in diameter
- Variable speed regulation claimed to reduce the harm to fish

Roman concrete was proposed as a suitable material for constructing the seawalls.

=== Finances ===
Soon after the proposal was rejected by the UK Government, it was reported that the company behind the plan, owned by Mark Shorrock, was £23 million in debt and had spent £37 million on the proposal. One of the investors in Tidal Lagoon Swansea Bay was Good Energy, a firm led at that time by Shorrock's wife Juliet Davenport. In return, Good Energy took a comprehensive charge over the project's assets, giving it a uniquely privileged class of shares compared to the other ordinary investors. Further questions have arisen out of the web of Shorrock-owned companies involved in the project, such as Tidal Lagoon plc which reportedly gave a loan to Tidal Lagoon Swansea Bay plc at a 20 per cent interest rate.

== Potential future plans ==
In January 2017, a government-commissioned review, published by Charles Hendry, gave backing to the technology's viability and the concept of tidal generation, but not specifically to this company's commercial proposal. The economics of the Swansea Bay proposal have been criticised. The effects on fish and wildlife were reportedly being assessed.

In February 2019, The Guardian reported that a Swansea tidal lagoon plan had been revived without the need for government funding. It was reported that Swansea-based Tidal Power plc had several major companies interested in buying the low-carbon electricity generated by the tide flowing through turbines in a concrete wall along Swansea Bay. Property company Land Securities, Cardiff Airport and property developer Berkeley Group were among those to have expressed an interest in signing a power purchase agreement (PPA) with the lagoon company.

=== Blue Eden ===
In January 2023, plans for a new Swansea tidal lagoon project called "Blue Eden" emerged; this multi-billion pound project would be fully funded by the private sector. Phase SA1 of the project is said to include an electric battery manufacturing plant, battery storage facility, a tidal lagoon in Swansea Bay with a floating solar farm, data storage centre, a green hydrogen production facility, an oceanic and climate change research centre, and hundreds of waterfront homes. Claimed it would be a worldwide first, the project could start within 18 months but would take more than a decade to complete.

== See also ==
- Electricity in Great Britain
- Energy policy of the United Kingdom
- Severn Barrage
