= Wind power in the United Kingdom =

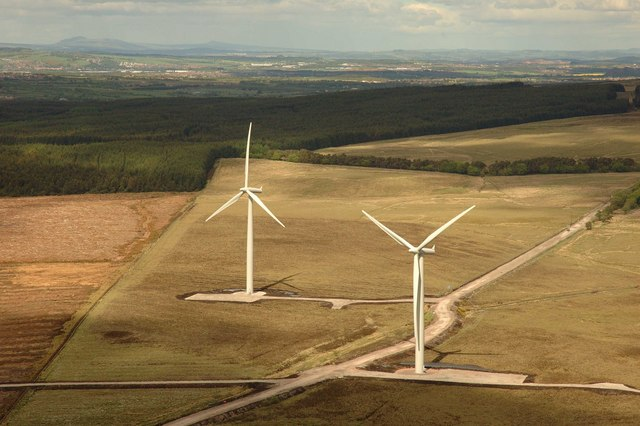
Two of the wind turbines at the Black Law Wind Farm in South Lanarkshire, Scotland

British grid electricity in 2025
1. Wind (29.7%)
2. Nuclear (11.8%)
3. Biomass (6.90%)
4. Solar (6.50%)
5. Hydro (1.60%)
6. Storage (1.60%)
7. Imports (15.1%)
8. Natural gas (26.8%)

The United Kingdom is a strong location for wind power in Europe. The combination of long coastline, shallow water and strong winds make offshore wind unusually effective.

By 2025, the UK had over 12,000 wind turbines with a total installed capacity of 32 gigawatts (GW): 16 GW onshore and 16 GW offshore, the fifth largest capacity of any country. In that year, wind generated over 85 TWh of electricity (giving an overall capacity factor of 30.3%), almost 30% of Great Britain's total generation.

Wind power is the largest source of renewable energy in the UK, but at under 5% provides far less primary energy than oil or fossil gas. However, wind power generates electricity, which is far more powerful in terms of useful energy than the same amount of thermal primary energy. Polling of public opinion consistently shows strong support for wind power in the UK, with nearly three-quarters of the population agreeing with its use in 2022, even for people living near onshore wind turbines.

The UK government has committed to a major expansion of offshore capacity to 60 GW by 2030, with 5 GW from floating wind; one reason for this is to improve energy security.

== History ==
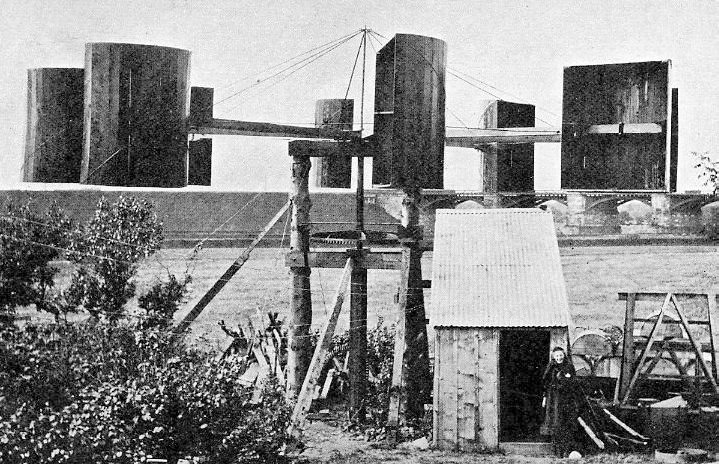
Blyth's "windmill" at his cottage in Marykirk in 1891

Wind power installed capacity in UK (MW)

UK Wind farm rated capacity by region
(installed 2015 and 2020, projected by 2025)

UK wind farm capacity by region (table of figures)
| UK Region | Onshore wind capacity | | Offshore wind capacity | | |
|---|---|---|---|---|---|
| | 2015 (MW) | 2020 (MW) | 2015 (MW) | 2020 (MW) | 2025 (MW); Projected |
| Scotland | 5,413 | 7,543 | 174 | 889 | 2,743 |
| N.W. England | 111 | 193 | 1,087 | 2,005 | 2,005 |
| N.E.England | 116 | 170 | 62 | 102 | 102 |
| Yorks & Humber | 771 | 806 | 429 | 1,659 | 8,045 |
| N. Ireland | 365 | 472 | 0 | 0 | 0 |
| Wales | 448 | 936 | 726 | 726 | 726 |
| East Midlands | 56 | 56 | 464 | 464 | 1,321 |
| Eastern | 131 | 157 | 1,053 | 2,381 | 2,381 |
| S.E. England | 60 | 60 | 1,070 | 1,470 | 1,470 |
| S.W. England | 20 | 20 | 0 | 0 | 0 |
| UK Totals | 7,491 | 10,414 | 5,064 | 9,695 | 18,792 |

The world's first electricity generating wind turbine was a battery charging machine installed in July 1887 by Scottish academic James Blyth to light his holiday home in Marykirk, Scotland. It was in 1951 that the first utility grid-connected wind turbine to operate in the United Kingdom was built by John Brown & Company in the Orkney Islands. In the 1970s, industrial scale wind generation was first proposed as an electricity source for the United Kingdom. An article on wind power costs from the period suggested that the capital cost per installed kilowatt would be in the range of £150 to £250, but that with inflation this would be competitive, and predicted that lower-cost new windmill designs would soon be available.

Modern commercial deployment began after electricity-market reforms around 1990. The Non-Fossil Fuel Obligation (NFFO) created auction rounds that required electricity companies to buy output from non-fossil generators at a premium funded by a levy, and the first commercial wind farm in the UK was commissioned at Delabole in Cornwall in 1991.

In 2007 the United Kingdom Government agreed to an overall European Union target of generating 20% of the EU's energy supply from renewable sources by 2020. Each EU member state was given its own allocated target: for the United Kingdom it is 15%. This was formalised in January 2009 with the passage of the EU Renewables Directive. As renewable heat and renewable fuel production in the United Kingdom are at extremely low bases, RenewableUK estimated that this would require 35–40% of the United Kingdom's electricity to be generated from renewable sources by that date, to be met largely by 33–35 gigawatts (GW) of installed wind capacity.

In December 2007, the Government announced plans for an expansion of wind energy in the United Kingdom, by conducting a Strategic Environmental Assessment of up to 25 GW worth of wind farm offshore sites in preparation for a new round of development. These proposed sites were in addition to the 8 GW worth of sites already awarded in the two earlier rounds of site allocations, Round 1 in 2001 and Round 2 in 2003. Taken together it was estimated that this would result in the construction of over 7,000 offshore wind turbines.

In 2010, 653 MW of offshore wind came online. The following year, only one offshore wind farm, phase 1 of the Walney Wind Farm, was completed in 2011 with a capacity of 183 MW. On 28 December 2011 wind power set a then record contribution to the United Kingdom's demand for electricity of 12.2%.

2012 was a significant year for the offshore wind industry with 4 large wind farms becoming operational with over 1.1 GW of generating capability coming on stream. In the year July 2012 to June 2013, offshore wind farms with a capacity of 1.463 GW were installed, for the first time growing faster than onshore wind which grew by 1.258 GW. The offshore wind industry continued to develop in 2013 with what was once the largest wind farm in the world, the London Array, becoming operational with over 630 MW of generating capability coming on stream.

During 2013, 27.4 TWh of energy was generated by wind power, which contributed 8.7% of the UK's electricity demand.

On 1 August 2013, Deputy Prime Minister Nick Clegg opened the Lincs Offshore Wind Farm. On commissioning the total capacity of wind power exceeded 10 GW of installed capacity. In 2014, Prime Minister David Cameron said that people were "fed up" with wind turbines being built close to homes; onshore wind subsidies were removed and in 2015 planning rules changed to give local authorities strong controls on wind turbine development, greatly reducing onshore deployment.

During 2014, 28.1 TWh of energy was generated by wind power (an average of 3.2 GW, about 24% of the 13.5 GW installed capacity at the time), which contributed 9.3% of the UK's electricity requirement. In the same year, Siemens announced plans to build a £310 million ($264 million) facility for making offshore wind turbines in Paull, England, as Britain's wind power capacity rapidly expanded. Siemens chose the Hull area on the east coast of England because it is close to other large offshore projects planned in coming years. The new plant began producing turbine rotor blades in December 2016. The plant and the associated service centre, in Green Port Hull nearby, will employ about 1,000 workers.

During 2015, 40.4 TWh of energy was generated by wind power and the quarterly generation record was set in the three-month period from October to December 2015, with 13% of the nation's electricity demand met by wind. 2015 saw 1.2 GW of new wind power capacity brought online, a 9.6% increase of the total UK installed capacity. Three large offshore wind farms came on stream in 2015, Gwynt y Môr (576 MW max. capacity), Humber Gateway (219 MW) and Westermost Rough (210 MW).

In 2016, the chief executive of DONG Energy (now known as Ørsted A/S), the UK's largest wind farm operator, predicted that wind power could supply more than half of the UK's electricity demand in the future. He pointed to the tumbling cost of green energy as evidence that wind and solar could supplant fossil fuels quicker than expected.

By 2020, climate change concerns led to greater public support for wind turbines, but despite government policy stating onshore wind is a "key building block" for electricity generation it was unclear if the 2015 onshore planning restrictions would be eased. In 2022 three-quarters of the UK population supported further wind generated power in the UK and the majority would be happy for a wind farm to be built near them.

The current half-hour power record for wind generation in the UK is 23,880 MW, set on 25 March 2026 between 13:30-14:00.

UK wind power capacity and generation Hover over individual cells for combined onshore and offshore totals.
| Year | Cumulative capacity (MW) | | Generation (GWh) | | Capacity factor (%) | | Share of total electricity supplied (%) | |
| Year | Onshore | Offshore | Onshore | Offshore | Onshore | Offshore | Onshore | Offshore |
|---|---|---|---|---|---|---|---|---|
| 2008 | 2,974 (Note: No onshore/offshore data available for this year.) | | 5,357 | | 20.6 | | 1.89 | |
| 2009 | 3,468 | 951 | 7,529 | 1,754 | 27.4 | 26.0 | 2.60 | |
| 2010 | 4,080 | 1,341 | 7,226 | 3,062 | 28.2 | 31.2 | 2.83 | |
| 2011 | 4,758 | 1,838 | 10,814 | 5,149 | 28.2 | 37.8 | 4.58 | |
| 2012 | 6,035 | 2,995 | 12,244 | 7,603 | 25.7 | 35.4 | 3.37 | 2.09 |
| 2013 | 7,586 | 3,696 | 16,925 | 11,472 | 27.6 | 37.6 | 4.82 | 3.27 |
| 2014 | 8,573 | 4,501 | 18,555 | 13,405 | 26.5 | 37.4 | 5.49 | 3.96 |
| 2015 | 9,212 | 5,094 | 22,852 | 17,423 | 29.5 | 40.5 | 6.73 | 5.13 |
| 2016 | 10,833 | 5,923 | 20,754 | 16,406 | 24.1 | 36.5 | 6.15 | 4.86 |
| 2017 | 12,597 | 6,958 | 28,725 | 20,916 | 27.0 | 40.9 | 8.61 | 6.27 |
| 2018 | 13,425 | 8,151 | 30,382 | 26,525 | 26.4 | 39.0 | 9.09 | 7.93 |
| 2019 | 13,998 | 9,856 | 31,860 | 31,975 | 26.4 | 40.1 | 9.62 | 9.65 |
| 2020 | 14,075 | 10,351 | 34,873 | 40,750 | 28.4 | 45.0 | 11.02 | 12.94 |
| 2021 | 14,493 | 11,176 | 29,327 | 35,597 | 23.5 | 37.8 | 9.16 | 11.17 |
| 2022 | 14,840 | 13,768 | 35,102 | 45,113 | 27.3 | 40.9 | 11.43 | 14.76 |
| 2023 | 15,424 | 14,653 | 32,496 | 49,650 | 24.3 | 40.4 | 10.63 | 16.33 |
| 2024 | 16,166 | 15,836 | 34,744 | 48,539 | 24.9 | 35.9 | 11.38 | 16.00 |
| 2025 | 16,438 | 16,570 | 35,077 | 52,019 | 24.6 | 36.7 | 12.1 | 17.9 |

== Wind farms ==
Locations of wind farms in and around the United Kingdom and Ireland

=== Offshore ===
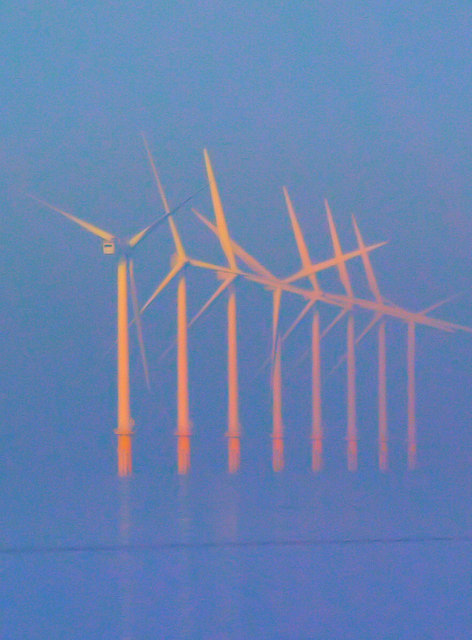
Burbo Bank Offshore Wind Farm

The total offshore wind power capacity installed in the United Kingdom at the start of 2022 was 11.3 GW. The United Kingdom became the world leader of offshore wind power generation in October 2008 when it overtook Denmark. In 2013, the 175-turbine London Array wind farm, located off the Kent coast, became the largest offshore wind farm in the world; this was surpassed in 2018 by the Walney 3 Extension.

The United Kingdom has been estimated to have over a third of Europe's total offshore wind resource, which is equivalent to three times the electricity needs of the nation at current rates of electricity consumption (In 2010 peak winter demand was 59.3 GW, in summer it drops to about 45 GW). One estimate calculates that wind turbines in one third of United Kingdom waters shallower than 25 metres (82 ft) would, on average, generate 40 GW; turbines in one third of the waters between 25 metres (82 ft) and 50 metres (164 ft) depth would on average generate a further 80 GW, i.e. 120 GW in total. An estimate of the theoretical maximum potential of the United Kingdom's offshore wind resource in all waters to 700 metres (2,300 ft) depth gives the average power as 2200 GW.

The first developments in United Kingdom offshore wind power came about through the now discontinued Non-Fossil Fuel Obligation (NFFO), leading to two wind farms, Blyth Offshore and Gunfleet sands. The NFFO was introduced as part of the Electricity Act 1989 and obliged United Kingdom electricity supply companies to secure specified amounts of electricity from non-fossil sources, which provided the initial spur for the commercial development of renewable energy in the United Kingdom.

2001 saw 17 applications being granted permission to proceed in what has become known as Round 1 of United Kingdom offshore wind development.

Offshore wind projects completed in 2010–2011 had a levelised cost of electricity of £136/MWh, which fell to £131/MWh for projects completed in 2012–14 and £121/MWh for projects approved in 2012–2014; the industry hopes to get the cost down to £100/MWh for projects approved in 2020.

The construction price for offshore windfarms has fallen by almost a third since 2012 while technology improved and developers think a new generation of even larger turbines will enable yet more future cost reductions. In 2017 the UK built 53% of the 3.15 GW European offshore wind farm capacity. In 2020, Boris Johnson pledged that, by the end of the decade, offshore wind would generate enough energy to power every UK home.

At the start of 2022 there was a total of 11.26 GW of installed offshore wind capacity. During 2022 an additional 3.2 GW of capacity was added with the commissioning of the Moray East, Triton Knoll and Hornsea Project Two wind farms. A further 13.6 GW of capacity is either under construction (Neart Na Gaoithe, Sofia, Seagreen & Doggerbank A) or has been awarded a Contract for Difference in Round 3 or Round 4.

==== Future plans ====
The government accelerated its decommissioning of coal power stations in early 2020, aiming for a 2024 phase-out date; achieving this on 30 September 2024 with the closure of Ratcliffe-on-Soar Power Station.

Recent British nuclear power station building programs have encountered significant technical issues and project overruns that have resulted in significant increases in project costs. These issues have resulted in new UK nuclear projects failing to secure project financing. Similarly, SMR technology is not currently economically competitive with offshore wind in the UK. Following the Fukushima nuclear disaster public support for new nuclear has fallen. In response, the UK government increased its previous commitment for 40 GW of Offshore wind capacity by 2030. As of 2020, this represents a 355% increase over current capacity in 10 years. It is expected the Crown Estate will announce multiple new leasing Rounds and increases to existing bidding areas throughout the 2020–2030 period to achieve the government's aim of 40 GW.

In 2023 the government increased offshore wind planned by the UK by 2030 to 50 GW, and has a pipeline of offshore wind power schemes of 100 GW.

==== Scottish offshore ====
In addition to the UK Round 3 auction, the Scottish Government and the Crown Estate also called for bids on potential sites within Scottish territorial waters. These were originally considered as too deep to provide viable sites, but 17 companies submitted tenders and the Crown Estate initially signed exclusivity agreements with 9 companies for 6 GW worth of sites. Following publication of the Scottish Government's sectoral marine plan for offshore wind energy in Scottish territorial waters in March 2010, six sites were given approval subject to securing detailed consent. Subsequently, 4 sites have been granted agreements for lease.

In 2022 Crown Estate announced the outcome of its application process for ScotWind Leasing, the first Scottish offshore wind leasing round in over a decade and the first ever since the management of offshore wind rights were devolved to Scotland. 17 projects were selected with a capacity of 25 GW.

Scotland has a target for 2030, made in 2023, of 11 GW of offshore wind by 2030. This would represent an increase of 400% in offshore wind and a 60% increase in total wind generated power

=== Onshore ===
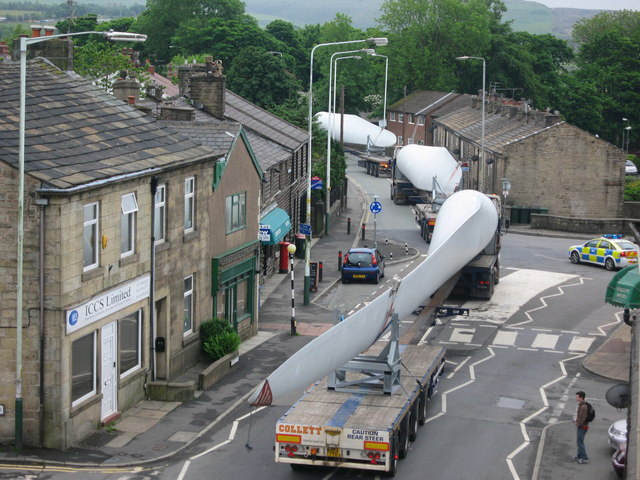
Turbine blade convoy for Scout Moor Wind Farm passing through Edenfield

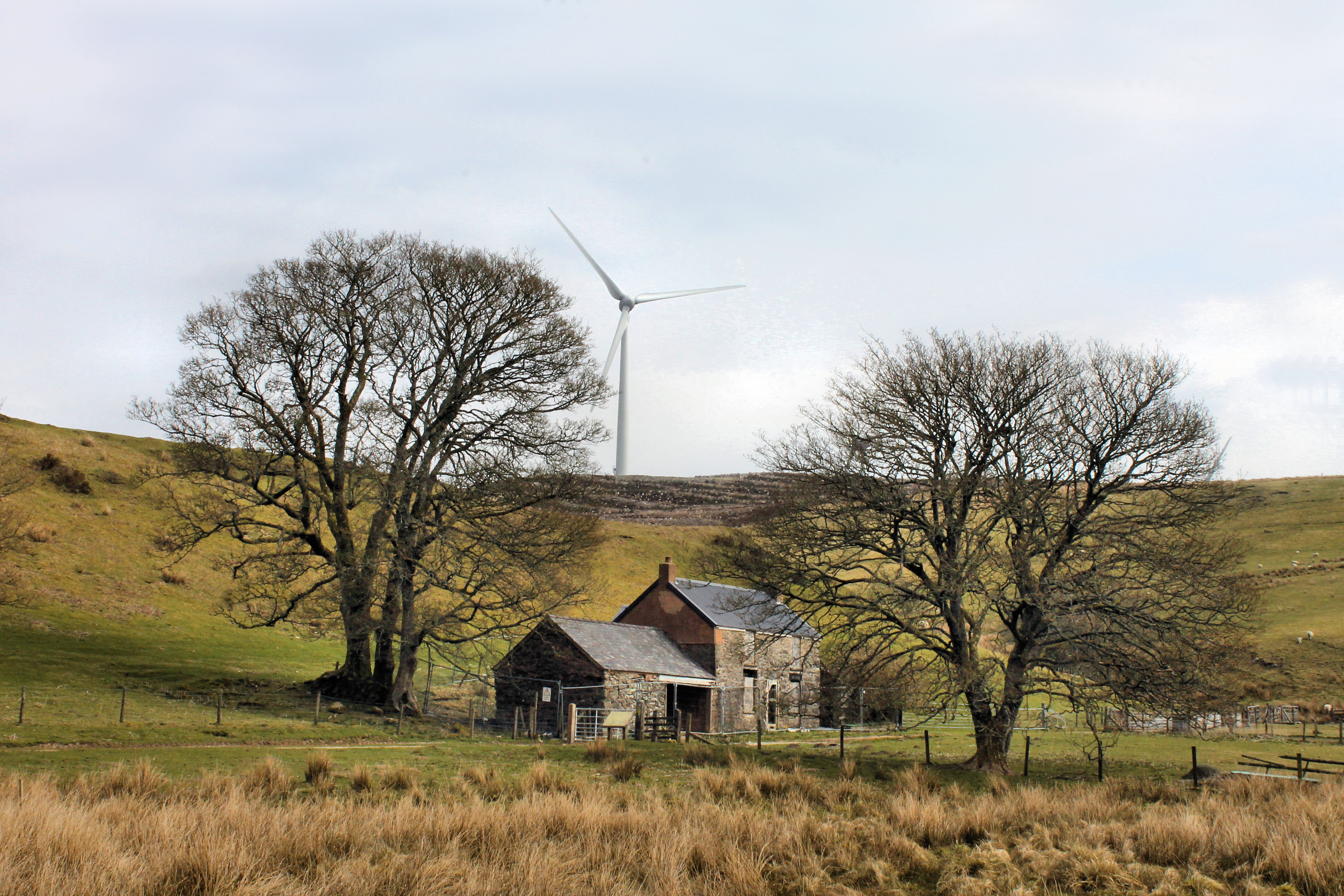
Hafoty Sion Llwyd, on the shore of Llyn Brenig

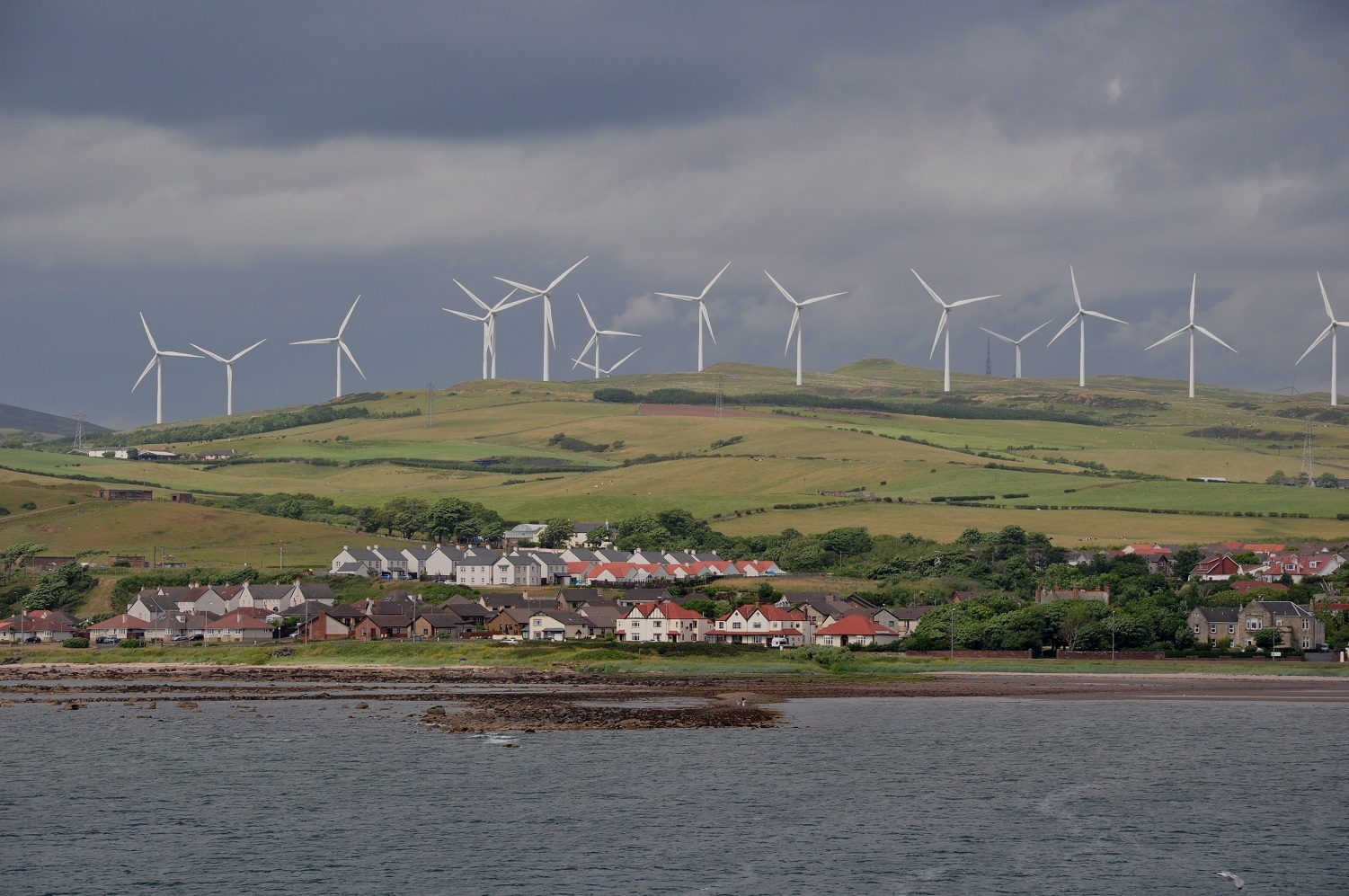
The Ardrossan Wind Farm in North Ayrshire, Scotland

The first commercial wind farm was built in 1991 at Delabole in Cornwall; it consisted of 10 turbines each with a capacity to generate a maximum of 400 kW. Following this, the early 1990s saw a small but steady growth with half a dozen farms becoming operational each year; the larger wind farms tended to be built on the hills of Wales, examples being Rhyd-y-Groes, Llandinam, Bryn Titli and Carno. Smaller farms were also appearing on the hills and moors of Northern Ireland and England. The end of 1995 saw the first commercial wind farm in Scotland go into operation at Hagshaw Hill. The late 1990s saw sustained growth as the industry matured. In 2000, the first turbines capable of generating more than 1 MW were installed and the pace of growth started to accelerate as the larger power companies like Scottish Power and Scottish & Southern became increasingly involved in order to meet legal requirements to generate a certain amount of electricity using renewable means (see Renewables obligations below). Wind turbine development continued rapidly and by the mid-2000s 2 MW+ turbines were the norm. In 2007, the German wind turbine producer Enercon installed the first 6 MW model ("E-126"); The nameplate capacity was changed from 6 MW to 7 MW after technical revisions were performed in 2009 and to 7.5 MW in 2010.

Growth continued with bigger farms and larger, more efficient turbines sitting on taller and taller masts. Scotland's sparsely populated, hilly and windy countryside became a popular area for developers and the United Kingdom's first 100 MW+ farm went operational in 2006 at Hadyard Hill in South Ayrshire. 2006 also saw the first use of the 3 MW turbine. In 2008, the largest onshore wind farm in England was completed on Scout Moor and the repowering of the Slieve Rushen Wind Farm created the largest farm in Northern Ireland. In 2009, the largest wind farm in the United Kingdom went live at Whitelee on Eaglesham Moor in Scotland. This is a 539 MW wind farm consisting of 215 turbines. Approval has been granted to build several more 100 MW+ wind farms on hills in Scotland and will feature 3.6 MW turbines.

As of September 2013, there were 458 operational onshore wind farms in the United Kingdom with a total of 6565 MW of nameplate capacity. A further 1564 MW of capacity is currently being constructed, while another 4.8 GW of schemes have planning consent.

In 2009, United Kingdom onshore wind farms generated 7,564 GWh of electricity; this represents a 2% contribution to the total United Kingdom electricity generation (378.5 TWh).

Large onshore wind farms are usually directly connected to the National Grid, but smaller wind farms are connected to a regional distribution network, termed "embedded generation". In 2009 nearly half of wind generation capacity was embedded generation, but this is expected to reduce in future years as larger wind farms are built.

Gaining planning permission for onshore wind farms continues to prove difficult, with many schemes stalled in the planning system and a high rate of refusal. The RenewableUK (formerly BWEA) figures show that there are approximately 7,000 MW worth of onshore schemes waiting for planning permission. On average, a wind farm planning application takes two years to be considered by a local authority, with an approval rate of 40%. This compares extremely unfavourably with other types of major applications, such as housing, retail outlets and roads, 70% of which are decided within the 13- to 16-week statutory deadline; for wind farms the rate is just 6%.

Approximately half of all wind farm planning applications, over 4 GW worth of schemes, have objections from airports and traffic control on account of their impact on radar. In 2008 NATS en Route, the BWEA, the Ministry of Defence and other government departments signed a Memorandum of Understanding seeking to establish a mechanism for resolving objections and funding for more technical research.

Wind farms in the UK often have to meet a maximum height limit of 125 m (410 ft) (excluding Scotland). However, modern lower cost wind turbines installed on the continent are over 200 m (660 ft) tall. This planning criteria has stunted the development of onshore wind in the UK.

As of 2023, the tallest onshore wind turbine in England is the Lawrence Weston Wind Turbine located in Avonmouth, Bristol, which reaches a total height of 150 m (490 ft).

==== List of the largest operational and proposed onshore wind farms ====
UK Onshore wind farms
| Wind farm | County | Country | Turbine model | Power (MW) each turbine | No. Turbines | Total capacity (MW) | Commiss- ioned | |
|---|---|---|---|---|---|---|---|---|
| Crystal Rig | Scottish Borders | Scotland | Nordex N80/ Siemens SWT-2.3 | 2.5/2.3 | 25/60 | 200.5 | May 2004 | (Note: Extended May 2007 (1a) & September 2010 (2 & 2a)) |
| Cefn Croes | Ceredigion | Wales | GE 1.5 se | 1.5 | 39 | 58.5 | June 2005 | |
| Black Law | South Lanarkshire | Scotland | Siemens SWT-2.3 | 2.3 | 88 | 124 | September 2005 | (Note: Extended September 2006 (Phase 2)) |
| Hadyard Hill | South Ayrshire | Scotland | Bonus B2300 | 2.5 | 52 | 120 | March 2006 | |
| Farr | Highland | Scotland | Bonus B2300 | 2.3 | 40 | 92 | May 2006 | |
| Slieve Rushen | County Fermanagh | Northern Ireland | Vestas V90 | 3 | 18 | 54 | April 2008 | (Note: Largest onshore farm in Northern Ireland) |
| Scout Moor | Lancashire | England | Nordex N80 | 2.5 | 26 | 65 | September 2008 | |
| Little Cheyne; Court | Kent | England | Nordex 2.3 | 2.3 | 26 | 59.8 | November 2008 | |
| Whitelee | East Renfrewshire | Scotland | Siemens SWT-2.3 | 2.3 | 140 | 322 | November 2008 | (Note: Largest operational onshore wind farm in the United Kingdom) |
| Arecleoch | South Ayrshire | Scotland | Gamesa G87 | 2 | 60 | 120 | June 2011 | (Note: Construction began October 2008, completed in June 2011) |
| Griffin | Perth & Kinross | Scotland | Siemens SWT-2.3 | 2.3 | 68 | 156.4 | February 2012 | (Note: Construction began August 2010, completed in February 2012) |
| Clyde | South Lanarkshire | Scotland | Siemens SWT-2.3 | 2.3 | 152 | 350 | September 2012 | (Note: Construction began January 2010, completed in September 2012) |
| Fallago Rig | Scottish Borders | Scotland | Vestas V90 | 3 | 48 | 144 | April 2013 | (Note: Construction finished April 2013) |
| Whitelee extension | East Renfrewshire | Scotland | Alstom ECO 100/ECO 74 | 3/1.6 | 69/6 | 217 | April 2013 | (Note: Construction finished April 2013) |
| Keadby Wind Farm | Lincolnshire | England | Vestas V90 | 2 | 34 | 68 | July 2014 | (Note: First power produced September 2013, England's largest onshore wind farm, Completed July 2014) |
| Harestanes | Dumfries & Galloway | Scotland | Gamesa G87 | 2 | 68 | 136 | July 2014 | |
| Clashindarroch Wind Farm | Aberdeenshire | Scotland | Senvion MM82 | 2.05 | 18 | 36.9 | March 2015 | (Note: Construction began June 2013) |
| Bhlaraidh | Highland | Scotland | Vestas V112/V117 | 3.45 | 32 | 108 | August 2017 | (Note: All 32 turbines connected to the grid.) |
| Pen y Cymoedd | Neath Port Talbot & Rhondda Cynon Taf | Wales | Siemens SWT-3.0 | 3 | 76 | 228 | September 2017 | (Note: Officially opened on 28 September. Largest onshore wind farm in Wales.) |
| Kilgallioch (Arecleoch; Phase 2) | Dumfries & Galloway | Scotland | Gamesa G90/G114 | 2.5 | 96 | 239 | 2017 | |
| Clyde Extension | South Lanarkshire | Scotland | Siemens SWT-3.0 | 3.2 | 54 | 172.8 | 2017 | |
| Stronelairg | Highland | Scotland | | 3.45 | 66 | 227 | December 2018 | (Note: Construction started March 2017 First power in March 2018.) |
| Dorenell | Moray | Scotland | | 3 | 59 | 177 | March 2019 | (Note: Last turbine base completed in September 2018.) |
| South Kyle | Dumfries & Galloway | Scotland | Nordex Delta 4000 | 4.8 | 50 | 240 | | (Note: Wind farm online June 2023.) |
| Viking Wind Farm | Shetland Islands | Scotland | Vestas V117 | 4.3 | 103 | 443 | September 2024 | (Note: Consent granted April 2012 with reduced number of turbines. Construction started in 2020.) |
| Cumberhead West | South Lanarkshire | Scotland | Nordex N133 | 5.7 | 21 | 119.70 | 2024/2025 | (Note: Successful in Contracts for Difference Allocation Round 4, Construction contract awarded 2023) |
| Stornoway | Western Isles | Scotland | | 5? | 36? | 200.00 | 2027 to 2031 | (Note: Consent granted in 2012. First use of 5 MW turbines onshore. Successful in Contracts for Difference Allocation Round 4, Delayed by 2022 interconnect questions, set for IC installation in 2030) |
| Uisenis (formerly Muaitheabhal ) | Western Isles | Scotland | | 3.6 | 25 | 165 | likely 2030+ | (Note: Halted in October 2014 due to external delays Successful in the spring 2019 capacity auctionIC link is needed and final permissions still awaited) |
| Hesta Head | Orkney Isles | Scotland | | 4.08 | 5 | 20.40 | not known | (Note: Successful in the spring 2019 capacity auction, consent lapsed 2022) |
| Druim Leathann | Western Isles | Scotland | | | 14 | 42 | not known | (Note: Successful in the spring 2019 capacity auction) |
| Costa Head | Orkney Isles | Scotland | | 4.08 | 4 | 16.32 | not known | (Note: Successful in the spring 2019 capacity auction) |
| Llandinam – Repower | Powys | Wales | | 3 | 34 | 102 | | (Note: Consent granted in 2015.) |
| Stranoch | | Scotland | | | | 99.96 | 2024/2025 | (Note: Successful in Contracts for Difference Allocation Round 4) |
| North Kyle Energy Project | | Scotland | | | | 212.00 | 2024/2025 | (Note: Successful in Contracts for Difference Allocation Round 4) |
| Chirmorie | | Scotland | | | | 81.60 | 2024/2025 | (Note: Successful in Contracts for Difference Allocation Round 4) |

== Economics ==
=== Subsidies and taxes ===
From 2002 to 2015, windfarms were subsidised through the Renewables Obligation which required British electricity suppliers to obtain an increasing proportion of their sales from renewable sources such as wind power or pay a penalty. The supplier then received Renewable Obligation Certificates (ROCs) for each MW·h of electricity purchased. The Energy Act 2008 introduced banded ROCs for different technologies from April 2009. Onshore wind receives 1 ROC per MWh, but since the banding review in 2009, offshore wind has received 2 ROCs to reflect its higher costs of generation. In Northern Ireland, a banding of 4 ROCs is available for small onshore turbines.

In 2008, wind energy received approximately 40% of the total revenue generated by the Renewables Obligation. This cost was added to end-user electricity bills, and Sir David King warned that this could increase UK levels of fuel poverty. The total annual cost of the Renewables Obligation reached £6.3 billion in 2019–20, of which 67% was for wind power.

The government closed the Renewables Obligation to new onshore wind power projects in 2016. Support for offshore wind was moved into the government's contracts for difference (CfD) scheme. Support for wind power under this programme rose to £1.7 billion in 2020, with £1.6 billion of that total shared between six offshore windfarms.

In 2023, in response to rising wholesale electricity prices, the government imposed a revenue cap on low-carbon generators, except those with fixed-price contracts. This was described as a 'windfall tax'.

=== Costs ===
The economics of wind power are driven by factors such as the capital, operating and finance costs, as well as the operational performance or capacity factor. These factors are in turn affected by issues such as location, turbine size and spacing and, for offshore windfarms, water depth and distance from shore. Operating costs and performance change over a windfarm's life, and several years of data are required before an assessment of the trajectory of these figures can be made.

A review of financial accounts published by the Renewable Energy Foundation in 2020 showed that UK offshore windfarm capital costs rose steadily from 2002 to around 2013, before stabilising and perhaps falling slightly. Operating costs had risen steadily up to the time of the study, but financing costs had fallen. This picture was confirmed by a comprehensive review of audited accounts data for UK offshore windfarms, which found that levelised costs rose from around £60–70/MWh for early projects, to around £140–160/MWh by 2010–13, before stabilising.

The Renewable Energy Foundation study also examined onshore wind costs, finding that capital costs had risen to around 2011 before declining slightly thereafter, while operating costs had risen steadily. Estimates of the levelised cost of UK onshore wind are older. A 2011 study by the engineering consultancy Mott MacDonald put onshore wind costs at £83/MWh, below new nuclear at £96/MWh.

=== Auction bids ===
In the UK's contract for difference auctions of 2017 and 2019, offshore windfarms made bids to supply the grid at strike prices much lower than anything seen before: £57.50/MWh in the 2017 auction and £39.65/MWh in 2019. These values are below the ostensible windfarm costs outlined in the previous section, and have therefore been widely taken as evidence of a fundamental change in the economics of offshore wind power; in other words, that technological advances have led to much lower costs.

There has been no similar reduction in bidding prices from onshore windfarms: by 2021, the lowest successful bid under the CfD regime had been £79.99/MWh.

=== Effects on electricity price ===
Historically, wind power raised costs of electricity slightly. In 2015, it was estimated that the use of wind power in the UK had added £18 to the average yearly electricity bill. This was the additional cost to consumers of using wind to generate about 9.3% of the annual total.

The building of UK wind farms has been supported through the Renewables Obligation and, since 2016, by price guarantee support through the Contracts for Difference scheme too. The 2018 levelised cost of electricity from offshore wind was in the range £100–150/MWh. However, in later CfD auctions, strike prices as low as £39.65/MWh were agreed for offshore wind projects, which led to an assumption that there had been an equivalent reduction in the underlying costs. Due to the structure of the contract for difference arrangements, wind generators pay the government when power prices exceed the strike price. Wholesale power prices averaged £57/MWh in 2018 and £113/MWh in 2021 before spiking above £400/MWh in 2022.

Offshore wind has historically been more expensive than onshore wind, but in 2016 it was predicted that it would have the lowest levelised cost of electricity in the United Kingdom in 2020 when a carbon cost was applied to generating technologies. In the 2022 AR4 CFD auction, offshore wind cleared at an average price of £37.35/MWh versus onshore wind's average price of £42.47/MWh (both expressed as 2012 prices).

=== Actual cost performance ===
A statistical and econometric analysis published in 2020 by the Renewable Energy Foundation (founded by TV presenter Noel Edmonds when he was opposing the development of a windfarm near his Devon house, and which has received funding from Calor Gas) of a majority of onshore and offshore windfarms built in the United Kingdom since 2002 with a capacity of more than 10 MW was performed by a former professor of the School of Economics at the University of Edinburgh. He calculated that the cost of onshore and offshore wind generation had not fallen significantly since 2002. Rather, capital and operating costs per MW had increased, the latter driven by higher than expected frequency of equipment failure and higher cost of preventative maintenance for new generations of larger turbines. The study concluded that, after current contracts guaranteeing above-market prices expired, expected revenues from generation would be less than operating cost. If confirmed, this would require financial regulators to impose heavy risk weightings on loans to offshore wind farm operators, effectively making them too risky for pension funds and small investors.

== Variability and related issues ==
Onshore wind capacity factor by season, UK average 1970-2003
| | Daytime | Overnight | Overall |
|---|---|---|---|
| Winter | 44% | 36% | 38% |
| Summer | 31% | 13% | 20% |

Wind-generated power is a variable resource, and the amount of electricity produced at any given point in time by a given plant will depend on wind speeds, air density and turbine characteristics (among other factors). If wind speed is too low (less than about 2.5 m/s) then the wind turbines will not be able to make electricity, and if it is too high (more than about 25 m/s) the turbines will have to be shut down to avoid damage. When this happens other power sources must have the capacity to meet demand, Three reports on the wind variability in the United Kingdom issued in 2009, generally agree that variability of the wind does not make the grid unmanageable; and the additional costs, which are modest, can be quantified. For wind power market penetration of up to 20% studies in the UK show a cost of £3-5/MWh. In the United Kingdom, demand for electricity is higher in winter than in summer and so are wind speeds.

While the output from a single turbine can vary greatly and rapidly as local wind speeds vary, as more turbines are connected over larger and larger areas the average power output becomes less variable. Studies by Graham Sinden suggest that, in practice, the variations in thousands of wind turbines, spread out over several different sites and wind regimes, are smoothed, rather than intermittent. As the distance between sites increases, the correlation between wind speeds measured at those sites, decreases.

The 2021 United Kingdom natural gas supplier crisis increased electricity prices, which were further worsened by rising demand amidst a lack of wind. Conversely, high production during storms have driven power prices to occasionally become zero or even negative.

=== Constraint payments ===
The development of the GB grid was characterised by the close proximity of major sources and demand for electricity. Since wind farms tend to be sited far from centres of demand, transmission capacity can be inadequate to deliver electricity to users, particularly when wind speeds are high. When the grid cannot deliver electricity generated, wind farm operators are paid to switch off. It is normally necessary to pay another generator – normally a gas-fired power station – on the other side of the constraint to switch on as well, to ensure that demand is met. These two incentives are referred to as "constraint payments" or curtailment, and they are one source of criticism of the use of wind power and its implementation; in 2011 it was estimated that nearly £10 million in constraint payments would be received, representing ten times the value of the potential lost electricity generation. Wind farm constraint payments have increased substantially year on year, £224 million, out of a total of £409 million in 2020–21. In addition, £582 million was spent rebalancing the system afterwards, mainly to gas-fired power stations.

=== Backup and Frequency Response ===
There is some dispute over the necessary amount of reserve or backup required to support the large-scale use of wind and solar energy due to the variable nature of its supply. In a 2008 submission to the House of Lords Economic Affairs Committee, E.ON UK argued that it is necessary to have up to 80–90% backup. Other studies give a requirement of 15% to 22% of installed intermittent capacity. National Grid, which has responsibility for balancing the grid, reported in June 2009 that the electricity distribution grid could cope with on-off wind energy without spending a lot on backup, but only by rationing electricity at peak times using a so-called "smart grid", developing increased energy storage technology and increasing interconnection with the rest of Europe. In June 2011, several energy companies including Centrica told the government that 17 gas-fired plants costing £10 billion would be needed by 2020 to act as back-up generation for wind. However, as they would be standing idle for much of the time they would require "capacity payments" to make the investment economic, on top of the subsidies already paid for wind. In 2015–2016, National Grid contracted 10 coal and gas-fired plants to keep spare capacity on standby for all generation modes, at a cost of £122 million, which represented 0.3% of an average electricity bill.

Grid scale battery storage is being developed in order to cope with the variability in wind and solar power. As of May 2021, 1.3 GW of grid storage batteries was active, along with the traditional 2.5 GW of pumped storage at Dinorwig, Cruachan and Ffestiniog. How much capacity this represents is unclear as GWh values are not disclosed.

With the increase in proportion of energy being generated by wind and solar on the UK grid, there is a significant reduction in synchronous generation. Therefore, in order to ensure grid stability, the National grid ESO is piloting a range of demand side and supply side frequency response products.

== Public opinion ==
Surveys of public attitudes across Europe and in many other countries show strong public support for wind power. About 80 per cent of EU citizens support wind power.

Which should be increased in Scotland?

A 2003 survey of residents living around Scotland's 10 existing wind farms found high levels of community acceptance and strong support for wind power, with much support from those who lived closest to the wind farms. The results of this survey support those of an earlier Scottish Executive survey 'Public attitudes to the Environment in Scotland 2002', which found that the Scottish public would prefer the majority of their electricity to come from renewables and which rated wind power as the cleanest source of renewable energy. A survey conducted in 2005 showed that 74% of people in Scotland agree that wind farms are necessary to meet current and future energy needs. When people were asked the same question in a Scottish renewables study conducted in 2010, 78% agreed. The increase is significant as there were twice as many wind farms in 2010 as there were in 2005. The 2010 survey also showed that 52% disagreed with the statement that wind farms are "ugly and a blot on the landscape". 59% agreed that wind farms were necessary and that how they looked was unimportant. Scotland is planning to obtain 100% of electricity from renewable sources by 2020.

A British 2015 survey showed 68% support and 10% opposition to onshore wind farms.

In Spring 2025, the Department for Energy Security and Net Zero’s Public Attitudes Tracker reported 80% support for offshore wind and 73% support for onshore wind, with 5% opposing offshore wind and 8% opposing onshore wind.

== Politics ==
In the UK, the Conservative government was previously opposed to further onshore wind turbines and cancelled subsidies for new onshore wind turbines from April 2016. The former prime minister David Cameron stated that "We will halt the spread of onshore wind farms", and claimed that "People are fed up with onshore wind" though polls of public opinion showed the converse. Leo Murray of Possible (formerly 10:10 Climate Action) said, "It looks increasingly absurd that the Conservatives have effectively banned Britain's cheapest source of new power." As the UK's Conservative government was opposed to onshore wind power it attempted to cancel existing subsidies for onshore wind turbines a year early from April 2016, although the House of Lords struck those changes down.

In 2015, they also introduced footnotes into the National Planning Policy Framework which introduced limitations on new onshore wind farm projects which were de-facto close to a total ban. This policy was repealed by the 2024 Labour government.

The wind power industry has claimed that the policy will increase electricity prices for consumers as onshore wind is one of the cheapest power technologies, although the government disputes this, and it is estimated that 2,500 turbines will not now be built. Questions have been raised about whether the country will now meet its renewable obligations, as Committee on Climate Change has stated that 25 GW of onshore wind may be needed by 2030.

In 2020, the Boris Johnson-led government decided to permit onshore wind power, and since December 2021 onshore wind developers have been able to compete in subsidy auctions with solar power and offshore wind. On 24 September 2020, Boris Johnson reaffirmed his commitment to renewables, especially wind power and nuclear in the United Kingdom. He said that the UK can be the "Saudi Arabia of wind power", and that

We've got huge, huge gusts of wind going around the north of our country—Scotland. Quite extraordinary potential we have for wind.

== Records ==
December 2014 was a record breaking month for UK wind power. A total of 3.90 TWh of electricity was generated in the month – supplying 13.9% of the UK's electricity demand. On 19 October 2014, wind power supplied just under 20% of the UK's electrical energy that day. Additionally, as a result of eight of 16 nuclear reactors being offline for maintenance or repair, wind produced more energy than nuclear did that day. The week starting 16 December 2013, wind generated a record 783,886 MWh – providing 13% of Britain's total electricity needs that week. And on 21 December, a record daily amount of electricity was produced with 132,812 MWh generated, representing 17% of the nation's total electricity demand on that day.

In January 2018 metered wind power peaked at over 10 GW and contributed up to a peak of 42% of the UK's total electricity supply. In March, maximum wind power generation reached 14 GW, meaning nearly 37% of the nation's electricity was generated by wind power operating at over 70% capacity. On 5 December 2019, maximum wind power generation reached 15.6 GW. At around 2 am on 1 July 2019, wind power was producing 50.64% of the electricity supply, perhaps the first time that over half of the UK's electricity was produced by wind, while at 2:00 am on 8 February 2019, wind power was producing 56.05% of the electricity supply. Wind power first exceeded 16 GW on 8 December 2019 during Storm Atiyah.

On Boxing Day 2020, a record 50.67% of energy used in the United Kingdom was generated by wind power. However, it was not the highest daily amount of energy ever generated by wind turbines; that came earlier in December 2020, when demand was higher than on Boxing Day and wind turbines supplied 40% of the energy required by the National Grid (17.3 GW). However, on 26 August 2020, wind briefly contributed 59.9% of the grids electricity mix.

In 2022 a new record was set on 24 May with maximum wind power generation reaching 19.916 GW. Then on 2 November wind generation reached 20.896 GW, providing 53% of Britain's electricity between 12:00pm and 12:30pm.

10 January 2023 saw 21.620 GW of generation, the first time over 21 GW had been produced by wind power in the UK. 21.8 GW of generation was hit on 21 December 2023.

On 5 December 2024, UK wind generation reached 22.4 GW, the first time above 22 GW. On 8 December 2024, it passed 22.5 GW.

On 5 December 2025 (between 17:30-18:00), UK wind generation passed 23 GW for the first time, peaking at 23,825 MW (a significant increase on the previous record of 22,711 MW, set on 11 November 2025). On 25 March 2026 (between 13:30-14:00), this was beaten by the current record of 23,880 MW.

== Manufacturing ==
As of 2020, there were no major UK-based wind turbine manufacturers: most are headquartered in Denmark, Germany and the USA.

In 2014, Siemens announced plans to build facilities for offshore wind turbines in Kingston upon Hull, England, as Britain's wind power rapidly expands. The new plant was expected to begin producing turbine rotor blades in 2016. By 2019, blades were being shipped in large numbers. The plant and the associated service centre, in Green Port Hull nearby, will employ about 1,000 workers. The facilities will serve the UK market, where the electricity that major power producers generate from wind grew by about 38 per cent in 2013, representing about 6 per cent of total electricity, according to government figures. At the time there were plans to continue to increase Britain's wind-generating capacity, to 14 GW by 2020. In fact, that figure was exceeded in late 2015.

On 16 October 2014, TAG Energy Solutions announced the mothballing and semi closure of its Haverton Hill construction base near Billingham with between 70 and 100 staff redundancies after failing to secure any subsequent work following the order for 16 steel foundations for the Humber Estuary in East Yorkshire.

In June 2016, Global Energy Group announced it had signed a contract in association with Siemens to fabricate and assemble turbines for the Beatrice Wind Farm, at its Nigg Energy Park site. It hopes in the future to become a centre for excellence and has opened a skills academy to help re-train previous offshore workers for green energy projects.

During 2021, £900M were invested in UK offshore wind power manufacturing. The UK offshore wind industry occupied 19,600 people directly in 2021, while thousands others worked in related businesses.

== Specific regions ==
=== Wind power in Scotland ===
Wind power is Scotland's fastest growing renewable energy technology, with 5328 MW of installed capacity as of March 2015. This includes 5131 MW of onshore wind and 197 MW of offshore wind.

Whitelee Wind Farm near Eaglesham, East Renfrewshire is the largest onshore wind farm in the United Kingdom with 215 Siemens and Alstom wind turbines and a total capacity of 539 MW. Clyde Wind Farm near Abington, South Lanarkshire is the UK's second largest onshore wind farm comprising 152 turbines with a total installed capacity of 350 MW. There are many other large onshore wind farms in Scotland, at various stages of development, including some that are in community ownership.

Robin Rigg Wind Farm in the Solway Firth is Scotland's only commercial-scale, operational offshore wind farm. Completed in 2010, the farm comprises 60 Vestas turbines with a total installed capacity of 180 MW. Scotland is also home to two offshore wind demonstration projects: The two turbine, 10 MW Beatrice Demonstrator Project located in the Moray Firth, has led to construction of the 84 turbine, 588 MW Beatrice Wind Farm set to begin in 2017 and the single turbine, 7 MW Fife Energy Park Offshore Demonstration Wind Turbine in the Firth of Forth. There are also several other commercial-scale and demonstration projects in the planning stages.

The siting of turbines is often an issue, but multiple surveys have shown high local community acceptance for wind power in Scotland. There is further potential for expansion, especially offshore given the high average wind speeds, and a number of large offshore wind farms are planned.

The Scottish Government has achieved its target of generating 50% of Scotland's electricity from renewable energy by 2015, and is hoping to achieve 100% by 2020. Renewables produced 97.4% of Scotland's net electricity in 2020, mostly from wind power.

In July 2017 work commissioning an experimental floating wind farm known as Hywind at Peterhead began. The wind farm is expected to supply power to 20,000 homes. Manufactured by Statoil, the floating turbines can be located in water up to a kilometre deep. In its first two years of operation the facility with five floating wind turbines, giving a total installed capacity of 30 MW, has averaged a capacity factor in excess of 50%

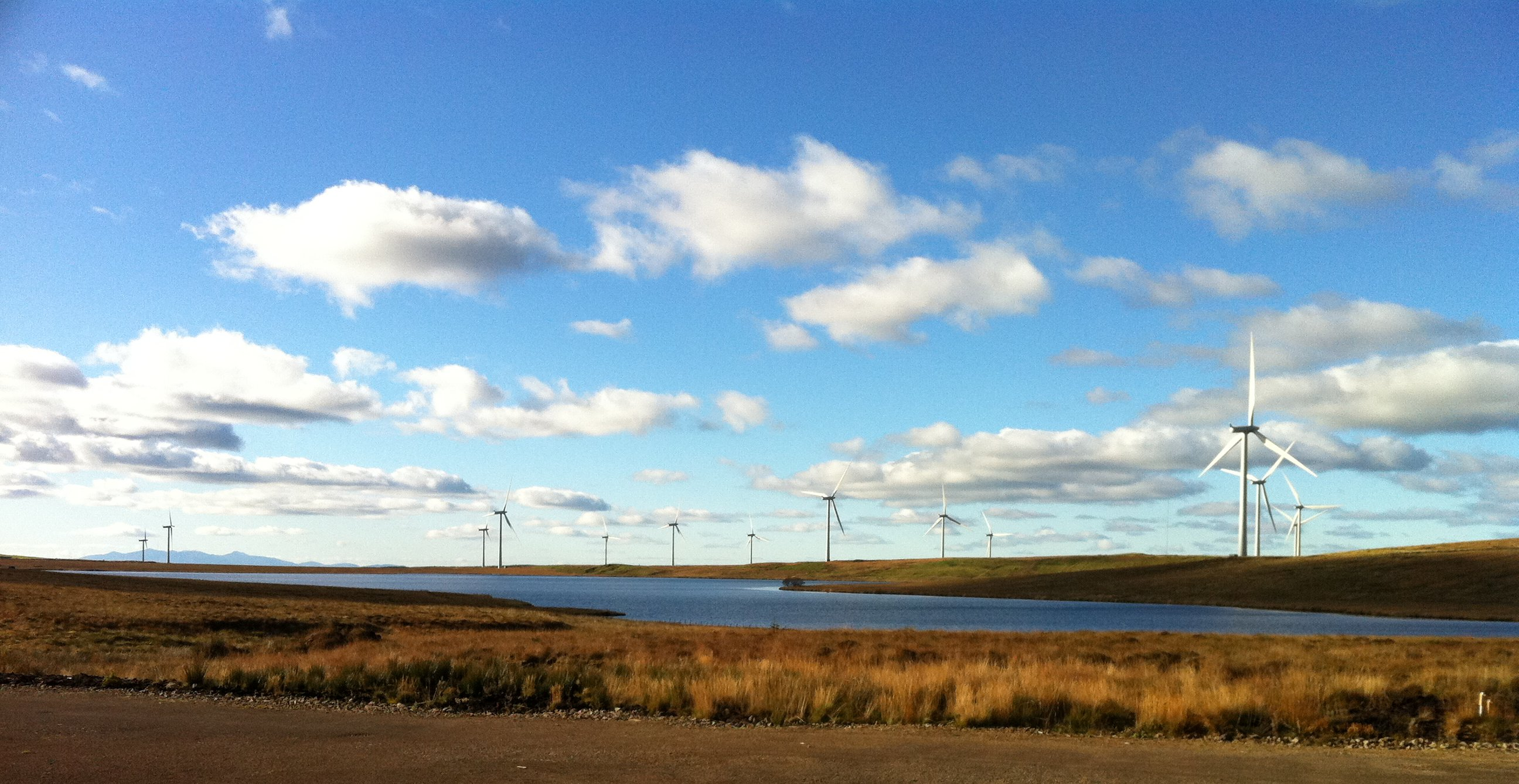
Whitelee Wind Farm with the Isle of Arran in the background

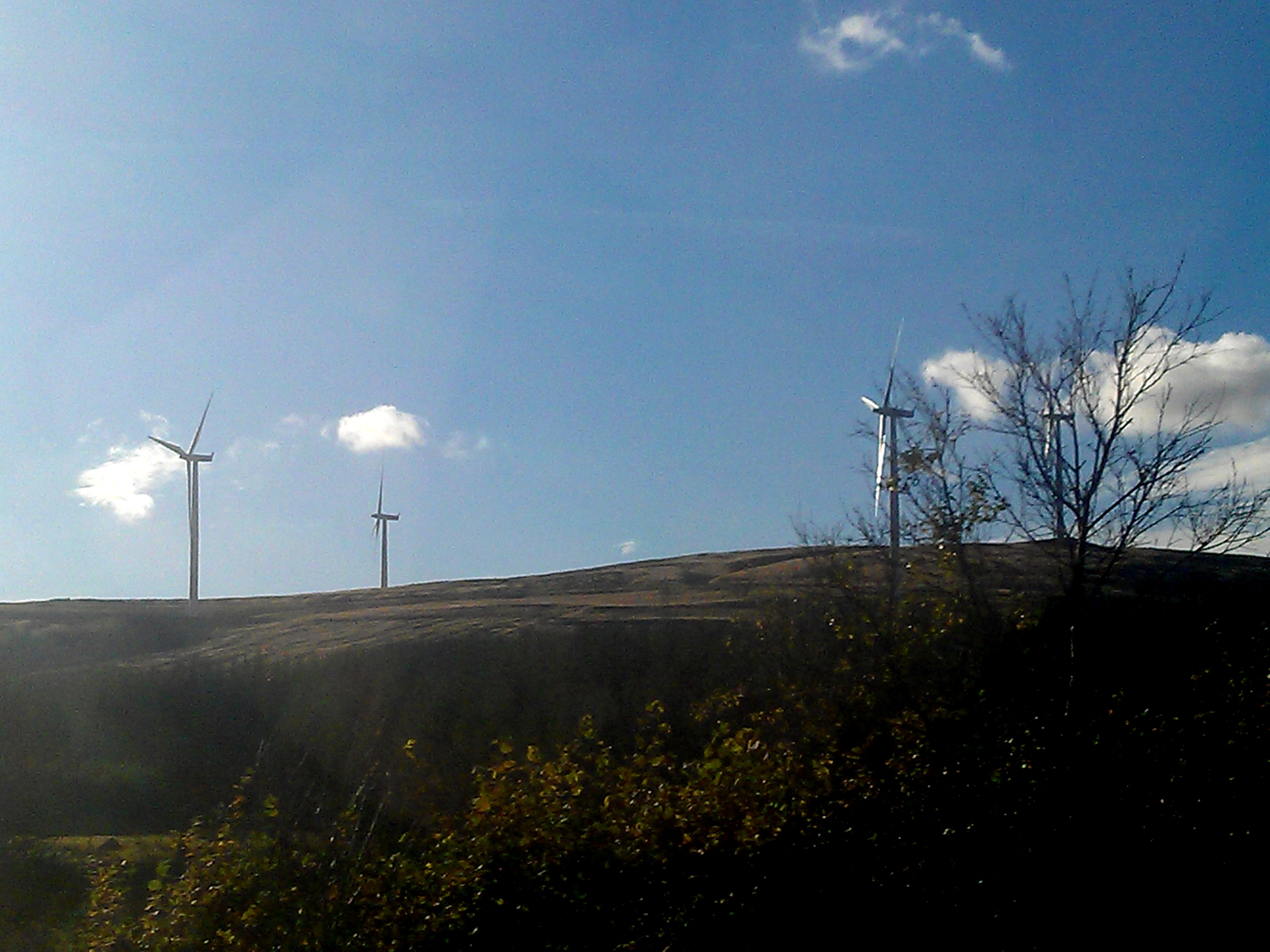
Clyde Wind Farm

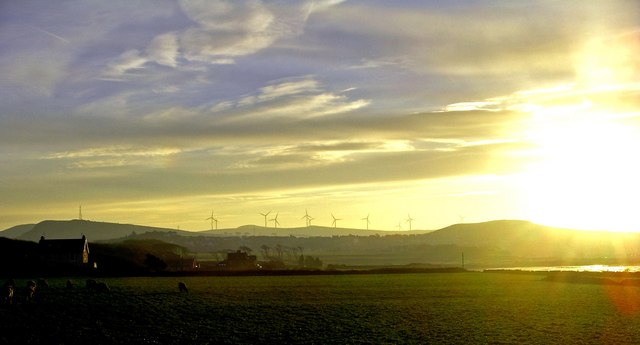
Ardrossan Wind Farm from Portencross, just after sunrise

== See also ==
Related lists

- Lists of offshore wind farms by country
- Lists of offshore wind farms by water area
- Lists of wind farms by country
- List of power stations in Scotland#Wind power
- List of wind turbine manufacturers

Related United Kingdom pages

- Renewable energy in the United Kingdom
- Renewable energy in Scotland
- Solar power in the United Kingdom
- Geothermal power in the United Kingdom
- Biofuel in the United Kingdom
- Hydroelectricity in the United Kingdom
- Energy in the United Kingdom
- Energy use and conservation in the United Kingdom
- Energy policy of the United Kingdom
- Green electricity in the United Kingdom

Developers and operators

- Baywind Energy Co-operative
- Centrica
- DONG Energy
- Ecotricity
- EDF
- Good Energy
- REG WindPower
- RWE npower
- SSE
- Talisman Energy
- Vattenfall
- Westmill Wind Farm Co-operative

Other related

- Environmental impact of wind power
- Friends of the Earth
- Cost of electricity by source
- Renewable Electricity and the Grid
- Renewable energy in the European Union
- Renewable energy by country
- United Kingdom National Renewable Energy Action Plan
- Special Protection Area
