= Gathersnow Hill =

Hill in Scotland

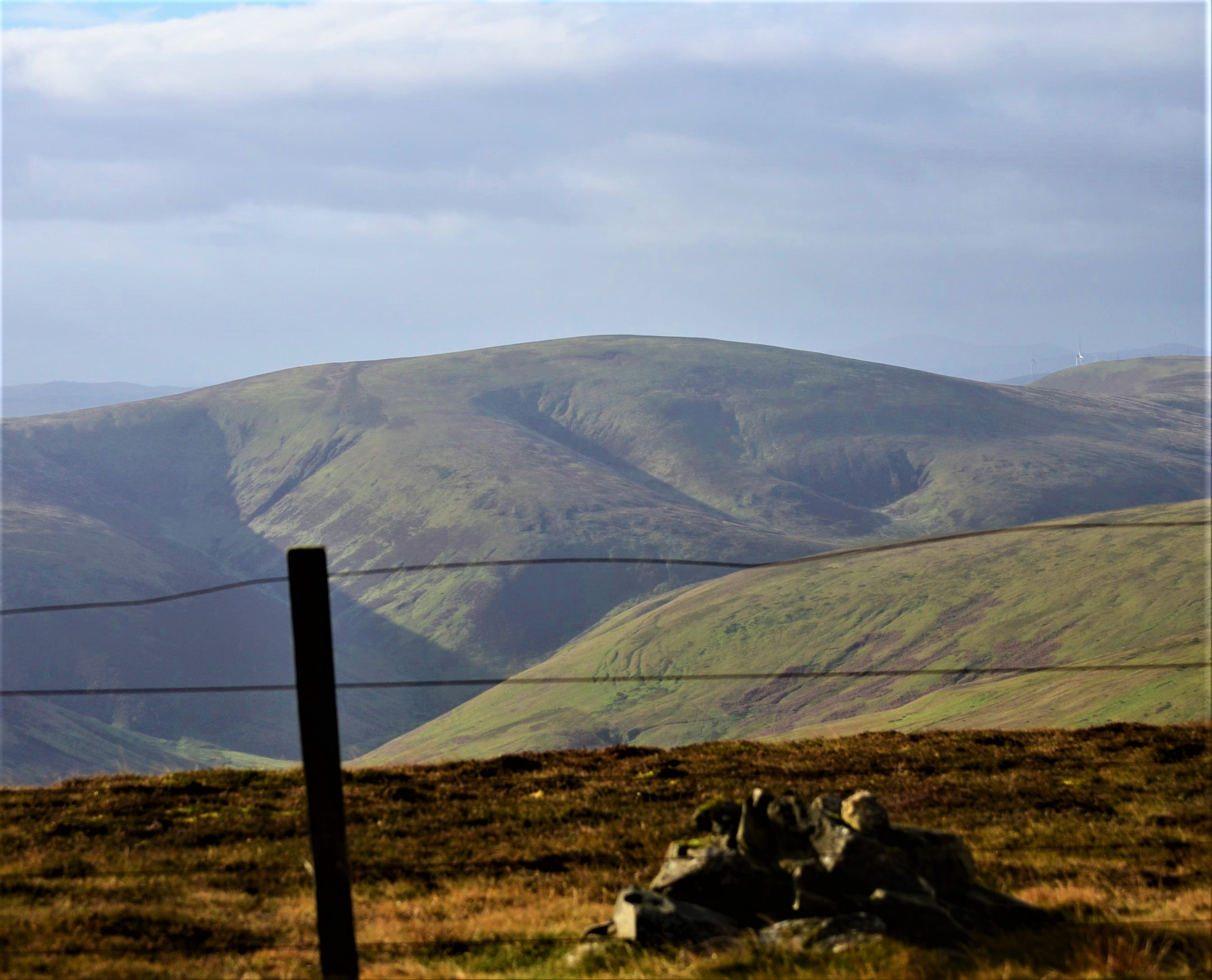

Highest point
- Elevation: 688 m (2,257 ft)
- Prominence: 210 m (690 ft)
- Listing: Ma,Hu,Tu,Sim,G,D,DN,Y
- Coordinates: 55°30′57″N 3°29′32″W

Geography
- Location: South Lanarkshire, Scottish Borders, Scotland
- Parent range: Culter Hills, Southern Uplands
- OS grid: NT 05879 25692
- Topo map: OS Landranger 72

Gathersnow Hill is a hill in the Culter Hills range, part of the Southern Uplands of Scotland. It lies west of the village of Tweedsmuir on the border of the Scottish Borders and South Lanarkshire. The second highest of the Culter Hills after Culter Fell to the north, the two Grahams are often climbed together.

== Subsidiary SMC Summits ==
Summit	Height (m)	Listing
Coomb Hill	640	Tu,Sim,DT,GT,DN
