= Barr, Ayrshire =

Village in the South West of Ayrshire, Scotland

Coordinates: 55.2018°N 4.7116°W

Barr
- Location within South Ayrshire
- Population: 160
- OS grid reference: NX274940
- Council area: South Ayrshire
- Country: Scotland
- Sovereign state: United Kingdom
- Post town: Girvan
- Postcode district: KA26
- Dialling code: 01465
- Police: Scotland
- Fire: Scottish
- Ambulance: Scottish
- UK Parliament: Ayr, Carrick and Cumnock
- Scottish Parliament: Carrick, Cumnock and Doon Valley

Barr is a village in South Ayrshire, Scotland, approximately 8 miles (13 km) from the town of Girvan. There are various opinions as to the origins of the name. The most likely is the Gaelic bàrr meaning 'a hill-top, a height'. It is believed to have been established in the 17th century by smugglers who needed a safe place close to the secluded bays of the Ayrshire coast while having access to the Raiders Road which runs close by. Barr has not grown much since that time. Currently Barr Village has a population of approximately 110, while the total for the Parish of Barr is in the region of 260.

== Location ==
The village is in the Stinchar Valley where the River Stinchar meets the Water of Gregg. The meeting point of these two watercourses is known locally as The Pot. Local residents and visitors often picnic on the banks of the Stinchar.

The village can be accessed from three directions. Each enters the village along a single track road with passing places. The main route is known locally as The Screws because of the twisting nature of the road. The Screws pass through the Hadyard Hill Wind Farm which was established by Scottish and Southern Electricity. Visitors can walk along the service routes and read about the wind farm at the information point in the car park.

=== Natural features ===
Barr has many naturally occurring features and a wealth of wildlife. It is popular with many people who enjoy the peace and quiet of the village and surrounds. There are several signed walks in the area, many of which pass through Forestry Commission land, although there are many which follow farm settings.

=== Buildings ===
The parish has a strong Covenanting history with several being laid to rest in the village cemetery. The village has a church which is open at all times. In addition, Kirk Angus lies at the heart of the village. Although the main building of the church has been converted into private residence, the clock tower was donated to the people of Barr.

=== Governance ===
Barr community council has been the longest suspended parish council in Scotland due to complaints surrounding a controversial hall project that has divided the village. The complaints, first received in late 2022, were finally resolved when the community council was unsuspended on 4 July 2025. During those years the organisation carried on its role and brought the first mobile phone signal to the village.

== Language ==
According to a reference in The Carrick Covenanters by James Crichton, the last place in the Scottish Lowlands where Gaelic was spoken was the village of Barr on the River Stinchar in Ayrshire. Barr was once regarded as one of the most isolated places in that part of Scotland, though situated only a few miles from Girvan as the crow flies. Crichton gives neither date nor details.
