= Hillshaw Head =

Hill in Scotland

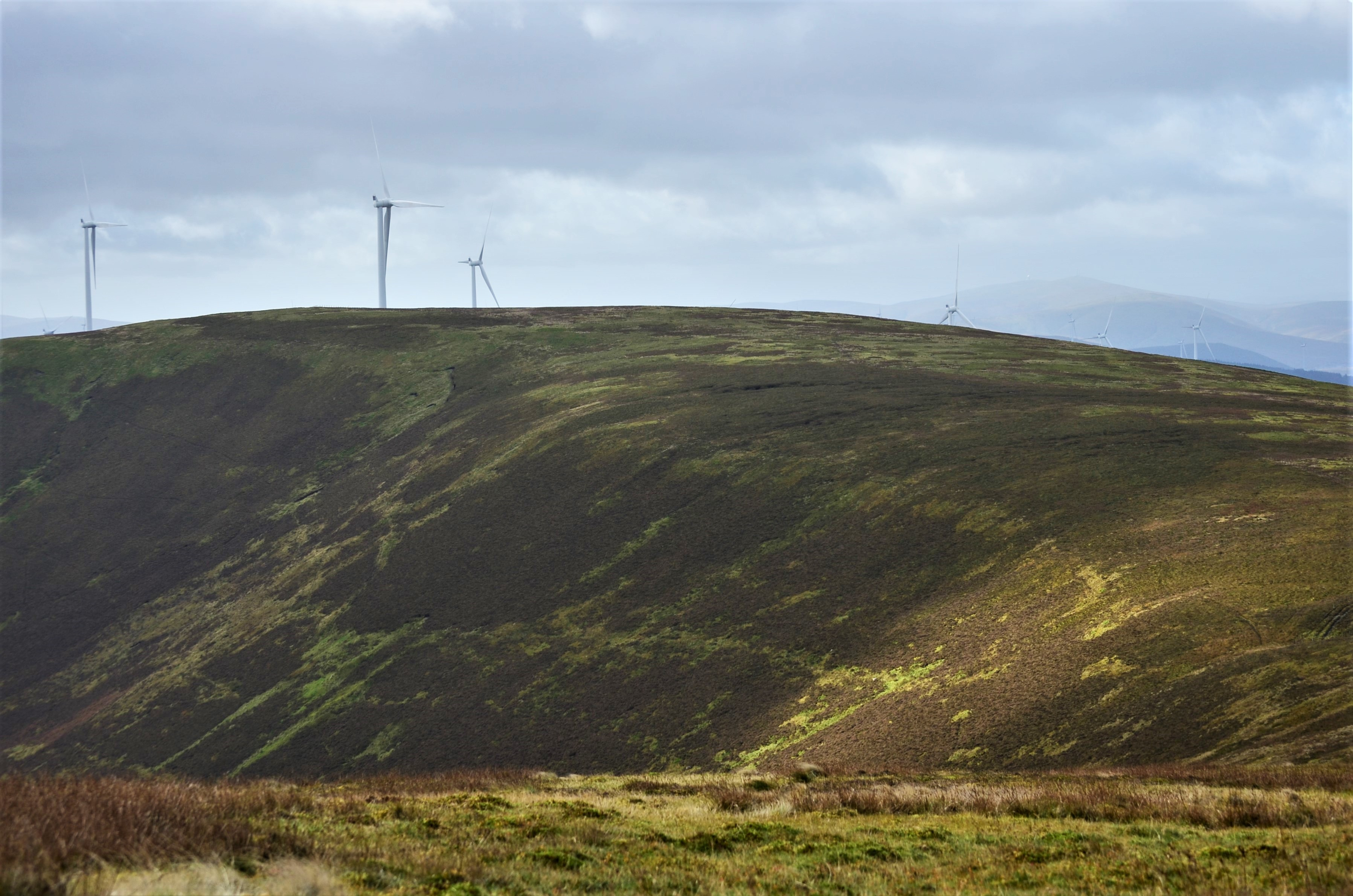

Highest point
- Elevation: 652 m (2,139 ft)
- Prominence: 54 m (177 ft)
- Listing: Tu,Sim,D,GT,DN

Geography
- Location: South Lanarkshire, Scottish Borders, Scotland
- Parent range: Culter Hills, Southern Uplands
- OS grid: NT 04839 24595
- Topo map: OS Landranger 72

Hillshaw Head is a hill in the Culter Hills range, part of the Southern Uplands of Scotland. An extension to the Clyde Wind Farm was commissioned in 2017 which partially built upon its slopes. It is most frequently climbed with the neighbouring hills as part of a round.

== Subsidiary SMC Summits ==
Summit	Height (m)	Listing
Coomb Dod	635	Tu,Sim,DT,GT,DN
