= Hudderstone =

Hill of the Southern Uplands of Scotland

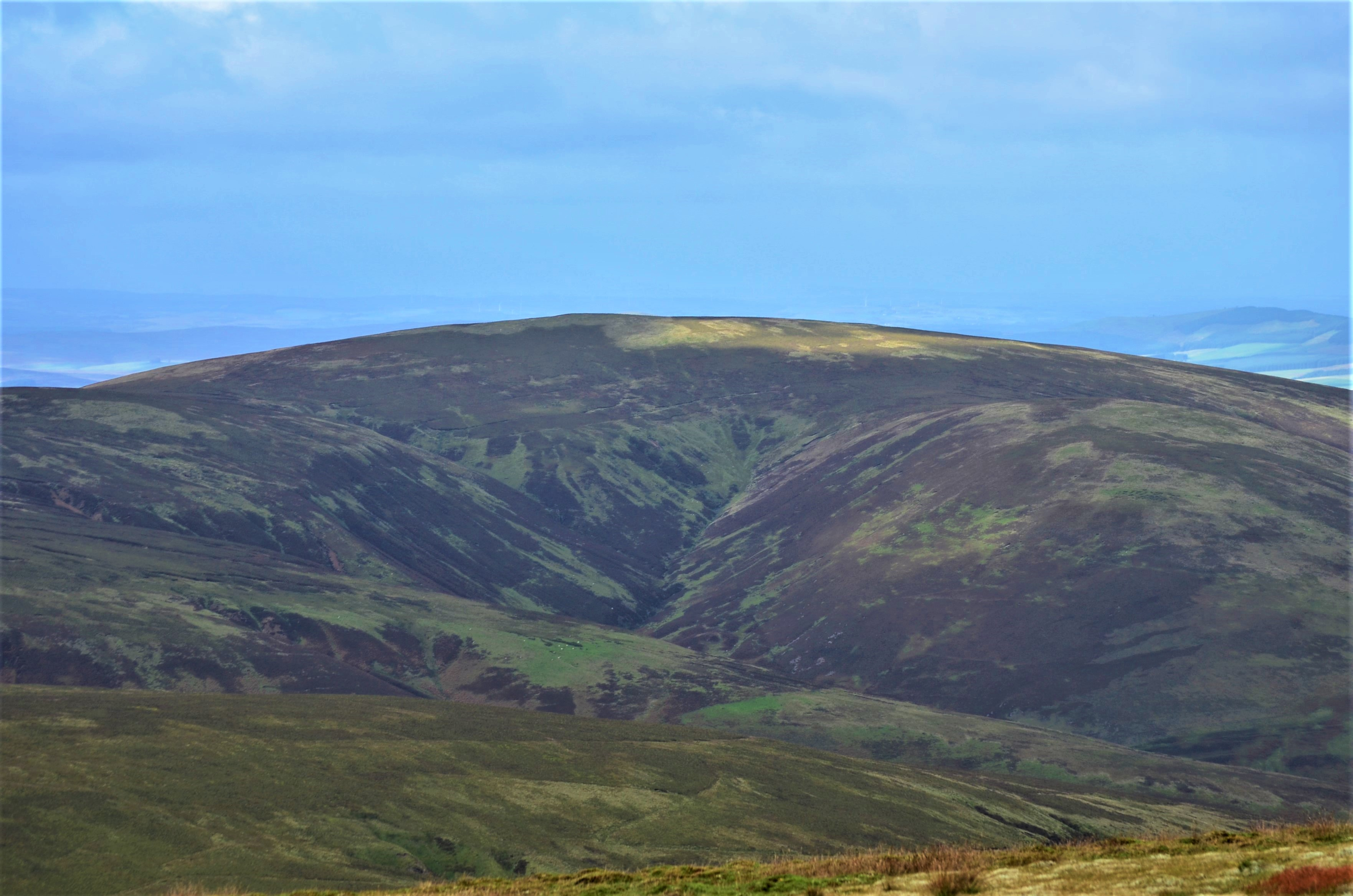

Highest point
- Elevation: 626 m (2,054 ft)
- Prominence: 111 m (364 ft)
- Listing: Hu,Tu,Sim,D,GT,DN,Y
- Coordinates: 55°31′42″N 3°33′03″W

Geography
- Location within Scotland
- Location: South Lanarkshire, Scotland
- Parent range: Culter Hills, Southern Uplands
- OS grid: NT 02212 27137
- Topo map: OS Landranger 72

Hudderstone is a hill in the Culter Hills range, part of the Southern Uplands of Scotland. Normally ascended as part of a popular round, its southern flanks are dotted with turbines from the Clyde Extension Wind Farm.
