= Slieve Rushen Wind Farm =

Power generation facility in County Fermanagh, Northern Ireland

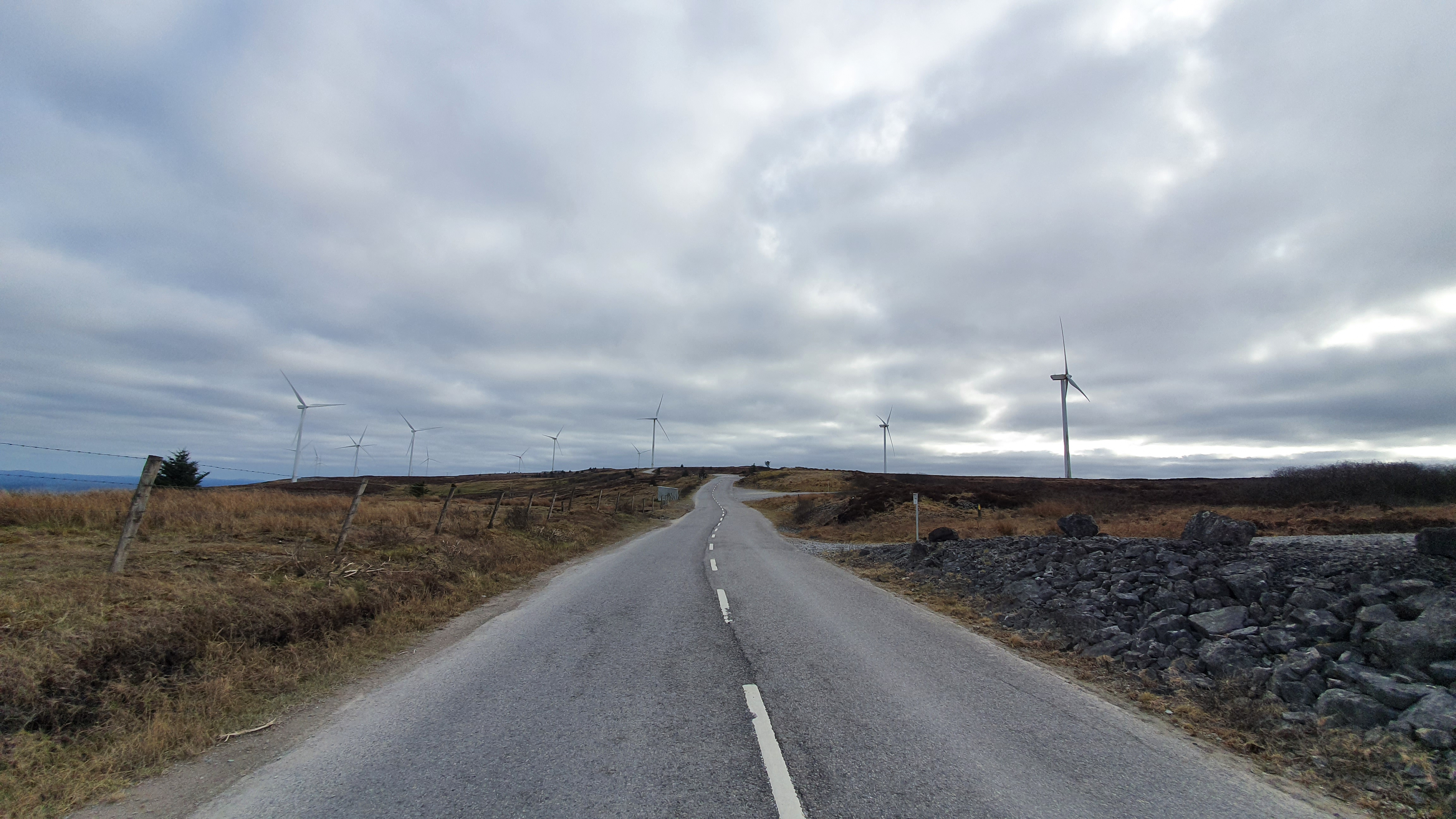
- Country: Northern Ireland, United Kingdom
- Location: County Fermanagh
- Coordinates: 54°09′36″N 07°37′12″W
- Status: Operational
- Construction began: July 2007
- Commission date: April 2008
- Construction cost: £900,000
- Operator: B9 Energy

Wind farm
- Type: Onshore

Power generation
- Units operational: 18 X 3 MW
- Make and model: Vestas: V90
- Nameplate capacity: 54 MW
- Annual net output: 135 GWh

Slieve Rushen Wind Farm is an 18-turbine wind farm in County Fermanagh, Northern Ireland, with a total capacity of 54 MW, enough to power over 30,000 homes. It was commissioned in April 2008.

== See also ==
- Wind power in the United Kingdom
- List of onshore wind farms
