= Chapelgill Hill =

Hill of the Southern Uplands of Scotland

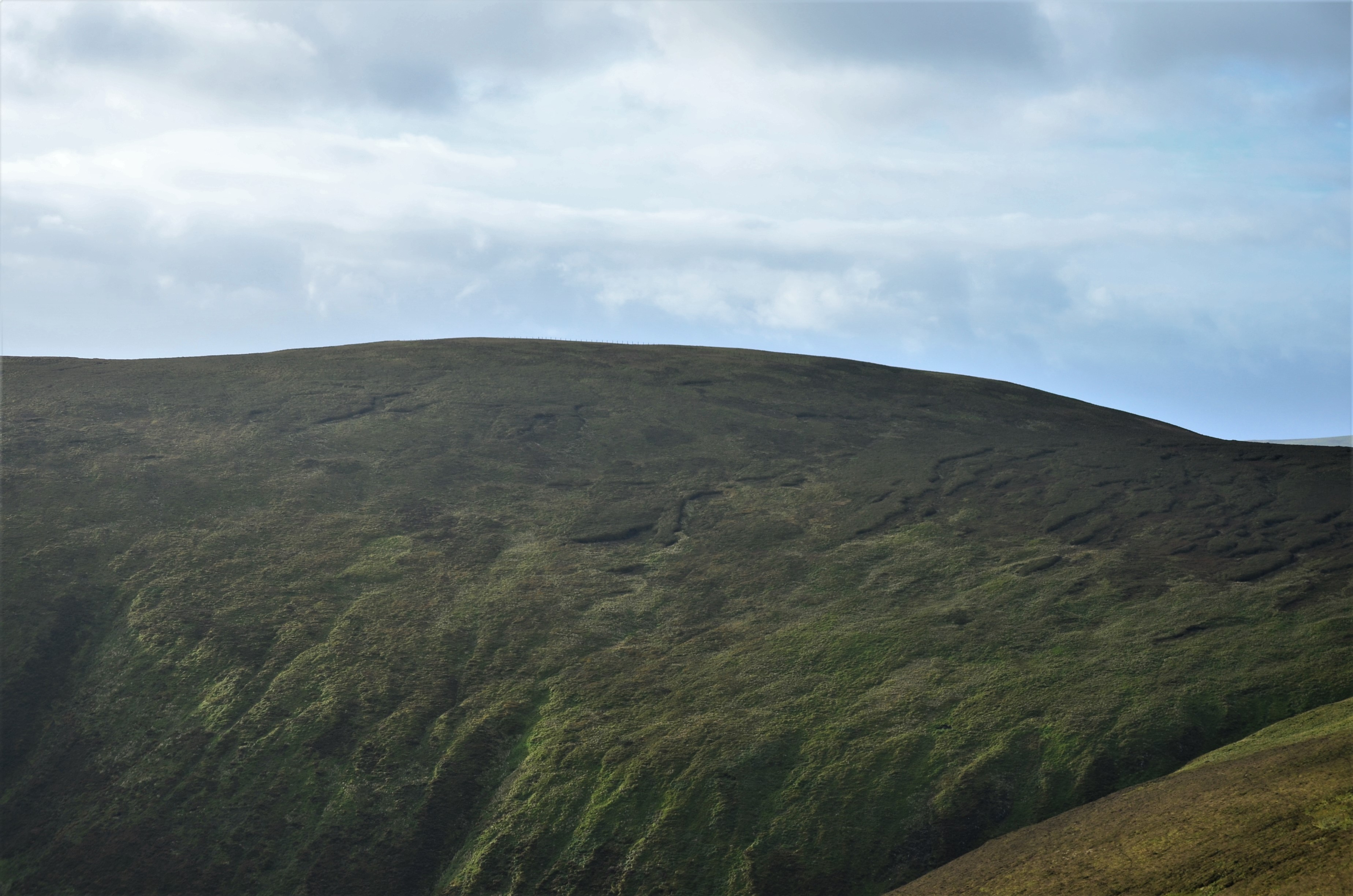

Highest point
- Elevation: 696 m (2,283 ft)
- Prominence: 104 m (341 ft)
- Listing: Hu,Tu,Sim,D,GT,DN,Y

Geography
- Location: Scottish Borders, Scotland
- Parent range: Culter Hills, Southern Uplands
- OS grid: NT 06717 30368
- Topo map: OS Landranger 72

Chapelgill Hill is a hill in the Culter Hills range, part of the Southern Uplands of Scotland. It is frequently climbed from the north-west, taking in the range's, and South Lanarkshire's, highest summit, Culter Fell.

== Subsidiary SMC Summits ==
Summit	Height (m)	Listing
Cardon Hill	675	Tu,Sim,DT,GT,DN
