= Culter Hills =

Range of hills of the Southern Uplands of Scotland

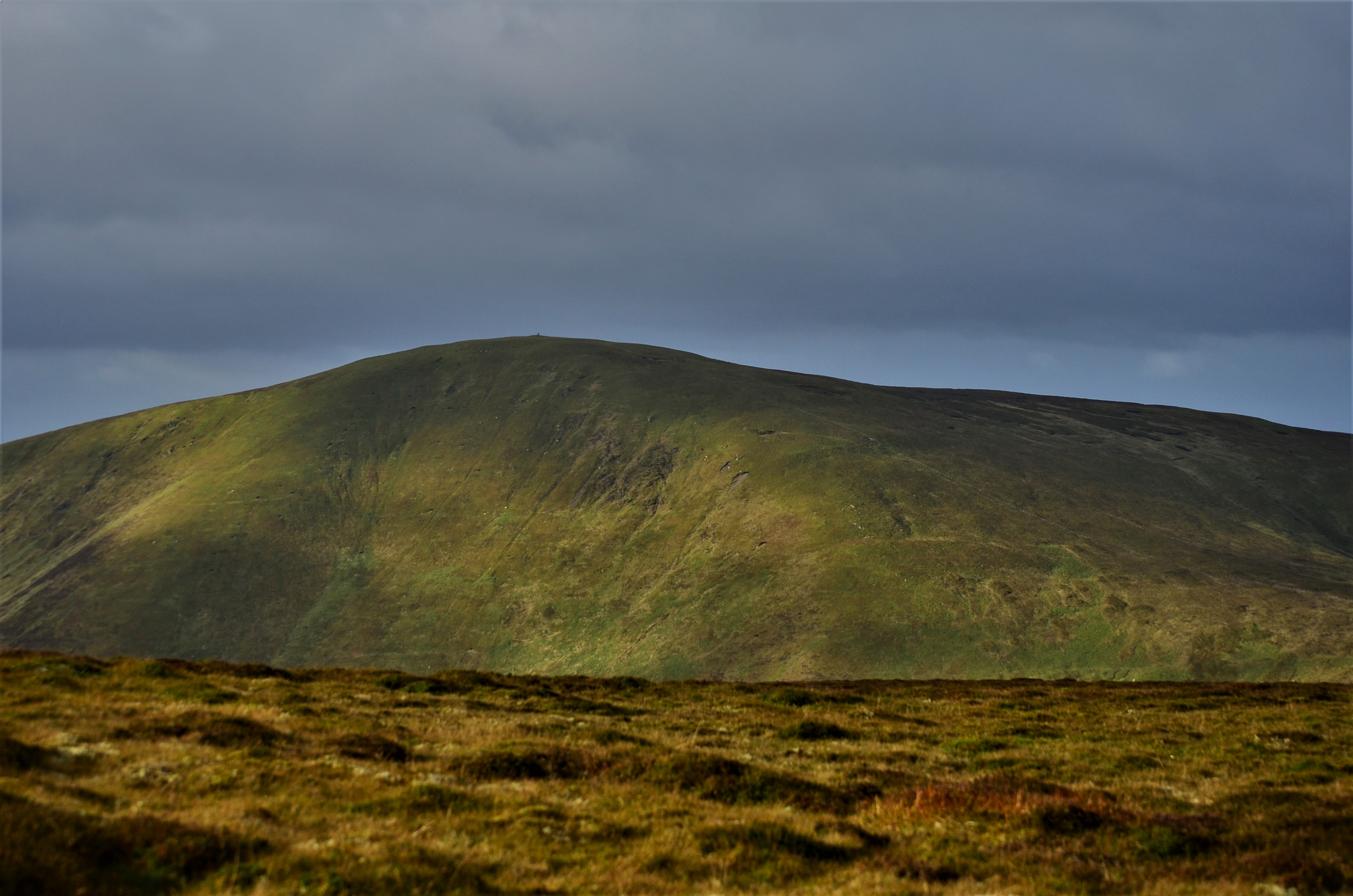
Culter Fell from Chapelgill Hill to the south.

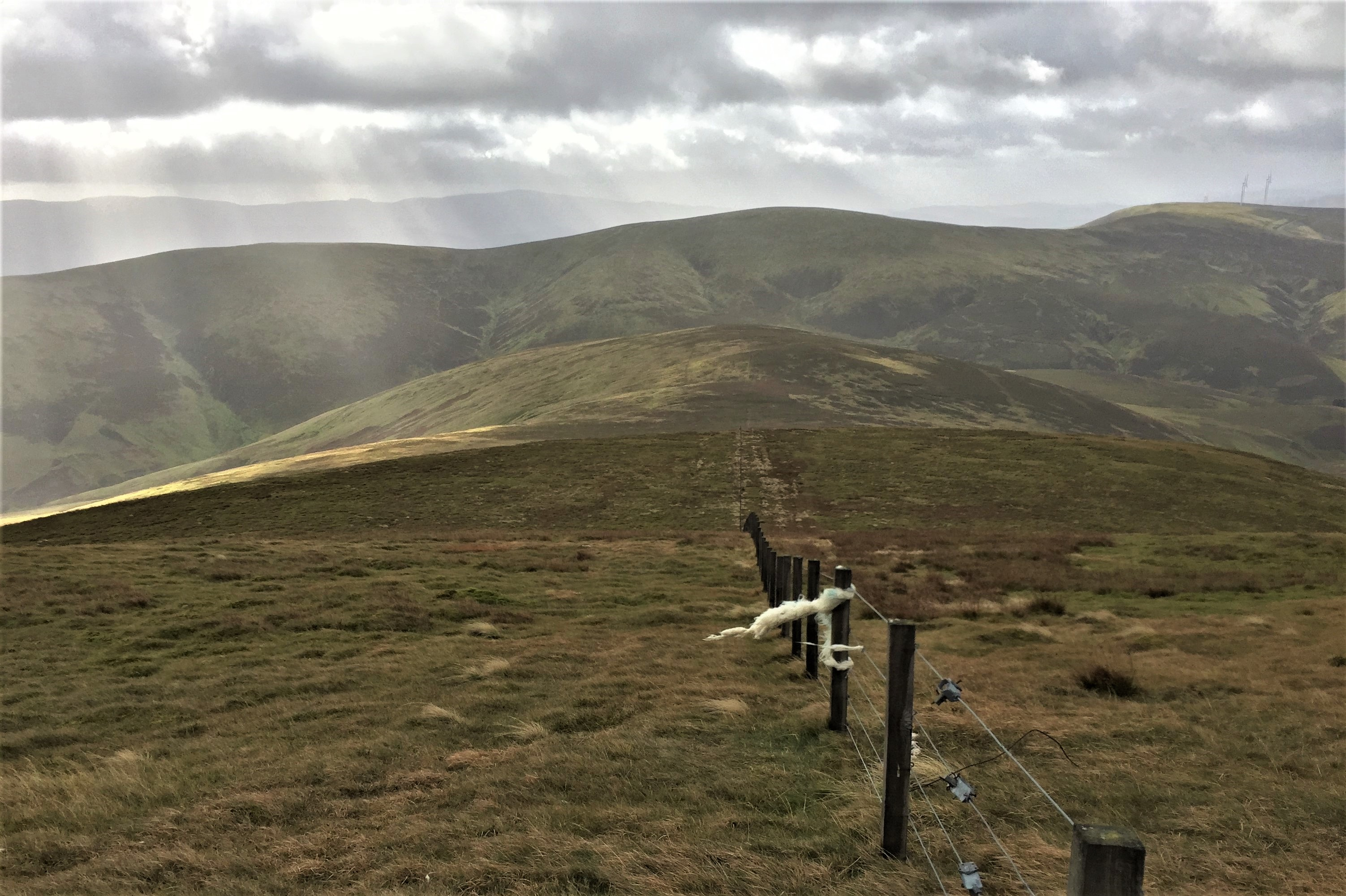
Glenwhappen Rig from Culter Fell. [L-R]: Coomb Hill, Gathersnow Hill and Hillshaw Head.

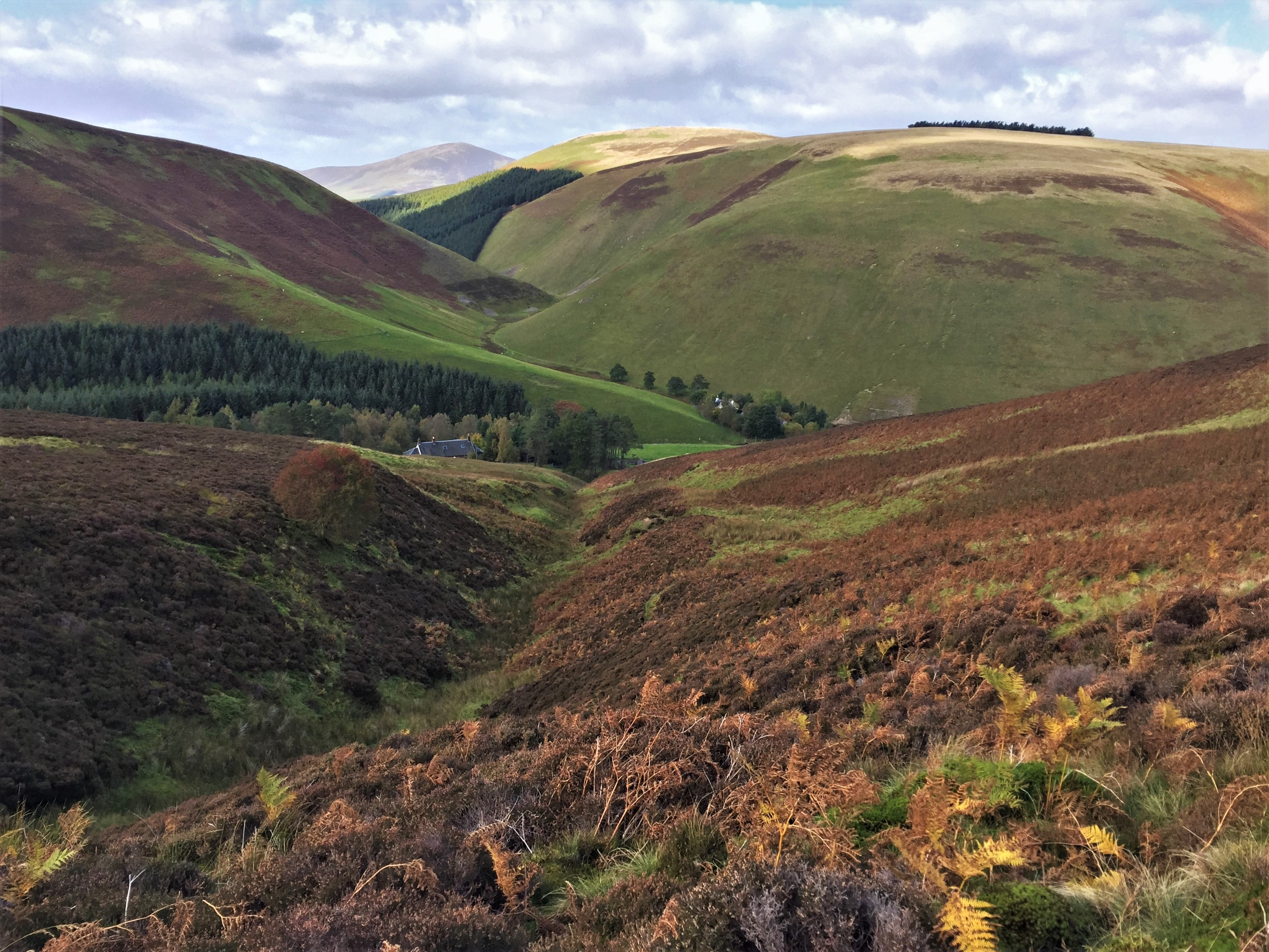
Looking northwest from Cowgill Rig. [L-R]: Broad Hill, Tinto and Lamington Hill.

The Culter Hills, Coulter Fells or variations thereof, are a range of hills, part of the Southern Uplands of Scotland. They are neighboured to the east by the Manor Hills and are split roughly in half by the border between South Lanarkshire and the Scottish Borders.

== The Hills ==
The hills form a roughly southwest–northeast rectangular shape and cover a considerable area, however the ridges within the range do not follow a common direction. The highest summit, Culter Fell, at 748m, is the highest point in South Lanarkshire and indeed the whole of Lanarkshire. Walks in the area frequently follow a popular round which begins in the Culter Glen, follows an ascent from the north up Culter Fell, down and up to Glenwhappen Rig to Gathersnow Hill followed by a long, flat walk to Hudderstone and back into the glen. This can be shortened to head back at Holm Nick, passing by the Coulter reservoir. Another popular option is to begin from Glenkirk farm to the east, also allowing for a circular route.

In a roughly clockwise direction, the hills in the range over 2000 ft are:

Summit	Height (m)	Listing
Culter Fell	748	Ma,Hu,Tu,Sim, G, D,CoH,CoU,DN,Y
Cardon Hill	675	Tu,Sim,DT,GT,DN
Chapelgill Hill	696	Hu,Tu,Sim,D,GT,DN,Y
Coomb Hill	640	Tu,Sim,DT,GT,DN
Gathersnow Hill	688	Ma,Hu,Tu,Sim, G, D,DN,Y
Hillshaw Head	652	Tu,Sim, D,GT,DN
Coomb Dod	635	Tu,Sim,DT,GT,DN
Hudderstone	626	Hu,Tu,Sim, D,GT,DN,Y

== Other information ==
The area is popular with gamekeepers as well as pastoral farming and it is advised to be observant when walking nearby from spring to late summer and heed the warnings of any landowners.

== Etymology ==
The area has a predominantly Scots influence. 'Coulter' is also a toponymic surname, likely derived from the village Coulter to the north. The word may derive from Scottish Gaelic cùl tir (back land) or Scots cootyre (safe place to store cows).
