= Delabole wind farm =

Wind farm in Cornwall, England

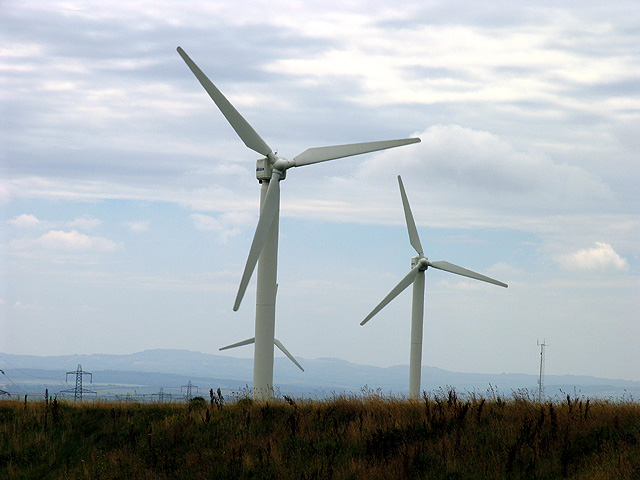
- Country: England
- Location: Cornwall
- Coordinates: 50.633°N 4.708°W
- Status: Operational
- Commission date: 1991
- Operator: Good Energy

Power generation
- Units operational: 4

External links
- Commons: Related media on Commons

The Delabole wind farm was the first commercial onshore wind farm built in the United Kingdom, in November 1991. It was initially developed by Windelectric Management Ltd.

== Location ==
Delabole is located in north Cornwall, England, UK, about two miles west of Camelford. It has the third highest elevation of the villages in Cornwall sitting at 800 feet (240 m) making it an ideal place for turbines. The farm is pastoral land, 1-mile (1.6 km) away from the village of Delabole and 2.5 miles (4.0 km) away from the Celtic Sea. The United Kingdom is the windiest landmass in Europe, receiving over 40% of the continent's wind energy resource annually.

== History ==
The farm was first proposed by landowners Peter and Martin Edwards in 1989, and was opened in 1991. They chose to invest in the turbines, instead of a nuclear power plant, in the hope of pushing the UK in a greener direction. It took three months of construction to build the site and less than a month to commission the turbines. In its first year, the Delabole wind farm brought in 100,000 visitors who were able to look around the turbines freely on tourist walks.

=== Gaia Energy Centre ===
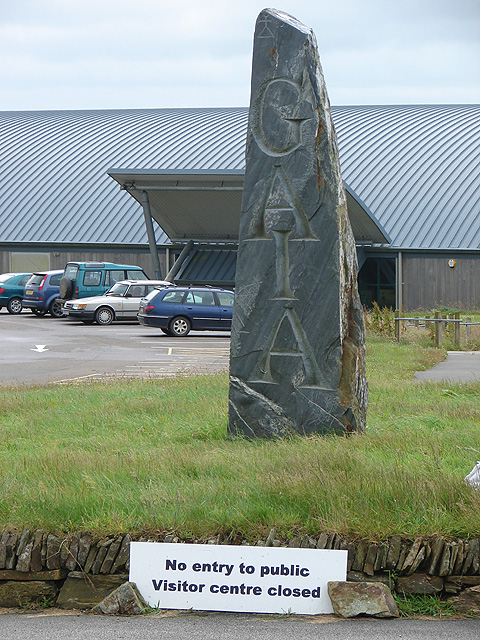
Gaia Energy Centre

In 2001, there was an attempt to attract 150,000 tourists annually to this wind farm by building the Gaia Energy Centre. It was supposed to promote and educate the people of Cornwall about energy conservation and the benefits of renewable energy. Inside there was an auditorium, café and shop, as well as interactive exhibits and a resource library. Most of the funding for the £5 million centre came from Europe, with £300,000 grants from Objective One and the South West Regional Development Agency. It closed down three years after opening after less than a tenth of the projected visitors came.

=== New ownership ===
Although the Gaia Energy Centre was unsuccessful, the farm continued to stay in production. Since 2002, the farm has been owned and operated by Good Energy, whose goal is to make the UK 100% renewable by 2050. For its first two decades, it operated ten 400 kW WD34 wind turbines, built by Vestas. In August 2010, these ten turbines were decommissioned to make way for better technology. In February 2011, an £11.8 million repowering of the facility was completed, which replaced the original ten with four new 2.3 MW Enercon E-70 turbines standing at 98 meters, which are three times larger. The funding came from a £9.6 million loan from the Co-operative bank and £2.2 million equity from Good Energy's own resources. After the rebuilding, the facility has a capacity of 9.2 MW.

In the beginning of 2013, Good Energy started offering a 20 per cent discount on energy bills to the residents living within two miles of the wind farm. According to The Guardian, the projected savings is £110 annually, where the average national household payment is about £550. Also, if the turbines produce more energy than expected, local customers can receive additional savings.

== Turbines ==
The introduction of the German Enercon E-70 turbines prevent the release of 13,708 tons of carbon emissions into the atmosphere annually. The amount of energy the new turbines produce is enough for over 7,800 homes, whereas the previous turbines only could provide energy for 2,700 homes.

=== Vestas WD34 features ===
- 400 kW output
- Three blades sweeping a total area of 908 m^{2}
- Tower height: 31 m
- Rotor diameter: 34 m

=== Enercon E-70 features ===
- Each turbine has a capacity of 2.3 megawatts
- Tower made of a steel tube and concrete
- Tower Height: 98 m
- Rotor Diameter: 71 m
- Gearless, with variable speeds ranging from 6-21 revolutions per minute (rpm) depending on the strength of the wind
- Each blade is adjustable
- An upwind rotor, in which the rotor is in front of the tower when the wind hits the turbine
- Three blades made of glass fibre reinforced plastic that move in the clockwise direction, sweeping a total area of 3,959 m^{2} turning the annular generator
- The brake system of the turbine includes:
1. Three independent pitch control systems with emergency power supply
2. A rotor brake
3. A rotor lock

== See also ==
- List of onshore wind farms in the United Kingdom
