= Calisen =

British energy company

- Type: Privately held company (formerly a Public company)
- Industry: Energy industry
- Founded: 2002; 24 years ago
- Headquarters: Manchester, United Kingdom
- Key people: Bert Pijls (Chairman); Catherine O'Kelly, (Chief Executive)
- Products: Energy meters and meter reading services
- Revenue: £208.8 million (2019)
- Operating income: £26.7 million (2019)
- Net income: £(80.1) million (2019)
- Website: www.calisen.com

Calisen is headquartered in Manchester, with offices in Wigan, London, Portsmouth and Market Harborough. It was listed on the London Stock Exchange in February 2020 but acquired by a consortium of private equity funds in March 2021. Alongside Plug Me In and Advizzo, Calisen forms part of Calisen Group (Holdings) Limited.

The company is co-owned by EQT, GIC and Equitix, which are large infrastructure investors.

== History ==
The company, which was established as Calvin Capital in 2002, received financial backing from Infracapital in 2007. After being acquired by Kohlberg Kravis Roberts in June 2016, it bought Wigan-based meter installer Lowri Beck in April 2019.

It was the subject of an initial public offering on the London Stock Exchange in January 2020.

In December 2020 the board of the company agreed to recommend to shareholders a takeover offer by a consortium of private equity funds consisting of the Global Energy & Power Infrastructure Fund III, Nineteenth Investment Company and various funds managed by Goldman Sachs.

In 2021, the company launched Plug Me In as a provider of low-carbon energy installation services. However, the business was subsequently restructured and many roles were transferred to other businesses or made redundant as the company withdrew from work on electric vehicles, heat pumps and work under the Energy Company Obligation Grants (ECO4) Programme.

In December 2024, private equity funds EQT AB and GIC bought a majority stake in the company in a deal which was worth $5 billion.

In February 2025, Calisen Group and Octopus Energy Germany announced a pilot for the financing and operation of smart meters in Germany. In November 2025 Calisen concluded a EUR 100m MAP services contract with Energy Metering Germany (the metering point operator arm of Octopus Energy Germany) solidifying this partnership for the long term. Calisen’s new German business now offers MAP services to Metering Point Operators across Germany.

In October 2025, Catherine O'Kelly was appointed as Chief Executive Officer of Calisen. She was previously Managing Director of British Gas Energy.

== Operations ==
The company provides, owns and manages energy meters through Calvin Capital and offers meter reading services through a part of the business which was formerly known as Lowri Beck.
