= Juliet Davenport =

British businesswoman

Juliet Davenport OBE (born 1968) is a British businesswoman. She founded and is the former chief executive of Good Energy, a renewable energy company in the United Kingdom.

== Origins and education ==
Juliet Sarah Davenport was born in Haslemere, Surrey, in 1968.

She read physics as an undergraduate at Merton College, Oxford before taking a master's degree in economics and environmental economics at Birkbeck, University of London. She also worked for a year at the European Commission on European energy policy and at the European Parliament on carbon taxation.

== Career ==
Davenport began working with Energy for Sustainable Development, an environmental consultancy. While there, she ran technology models and analysed policies on renewable energy from countries around Europe.

In 1999, Davenport set up Unit[e], a subsidiary of the Monkton Group, of which she later became CEO. In 2003, Unit[e] was renamed Good Energy. The company was named a Sunday Times Best Green Company in 2008 and 2009, and received The Observer’s Ethical Award for best online retail initiative in 2009. In 2012, Davenport was named as PLUS CEO of the year.

In March 2021, the podcast Great Green Questions launched with Davenport as host. On the series she speaks to a variable panel of celebrities, experts and comedians about the issues of sustainable living.

From 1 May 2021 Davenport stepped down as CEO of Good Energy, and she left the company's board in 2022. She holds a number of non-executive directorships and is chair of Atrato Onsite Energy, a company which installs solar generation on roofs of commercial buildings.

Davenport has been a trustee of the Energy Institute professional membership body since 2019, and in July 2022 was appointed as its president for a three-year term.

Davenport was appointed as a Crown Estate Commissioner in 2020, renewed in 2024 for another four years.

== Honours and awards ==
Davenport was appointed an Officer of the Order of the British Empire (OBE) in the 2013 New Year Honours for services to renewable energy supply. She holds honorary degrees from the University of Bristol (2018) and the University of Bath (2022).

== Published works ==
- Davenport, Juliet (2022). The Green Start-up. Blink Publishing. ISBN 978-1-78870-751-0.

== Personal life ==
Davenport was married to Mark Shorrock (now divorced) and has a daughter and a stepdaughter.
