= Culter Fell =

Hill of the Southern Uplands of Scotland

Coordinates: 55.54546°N 3.50400°W

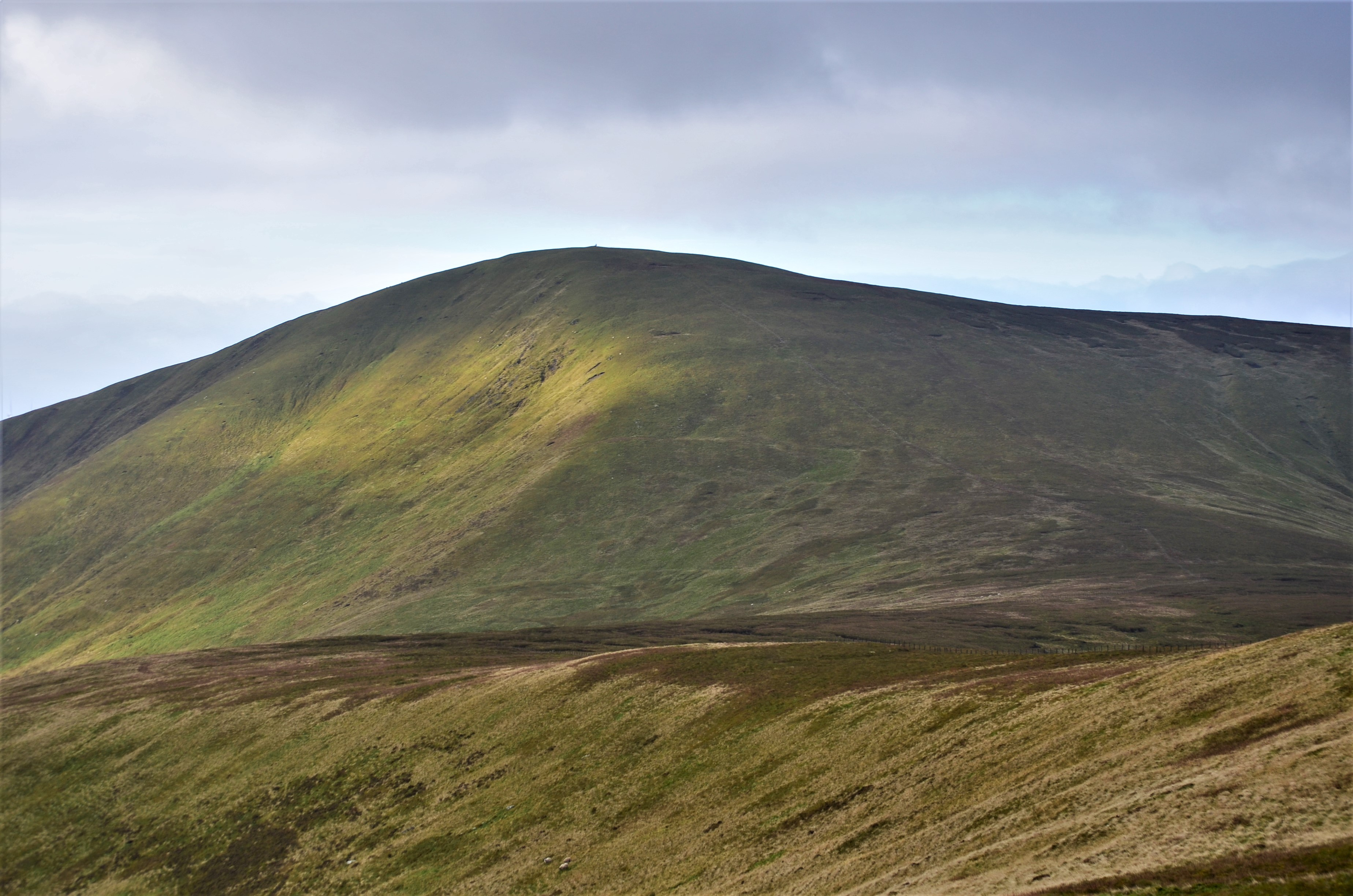

Highest point
- Elevation: 748 m (2,454 ft)
- Prominence: 350 m
- Listing: Ma,Hu,Tu,Sim, G, D,CoH,CoU,DN,Y

Naming
- Pronunciation: /ˌkuːtər ˈfɛl/

Geography
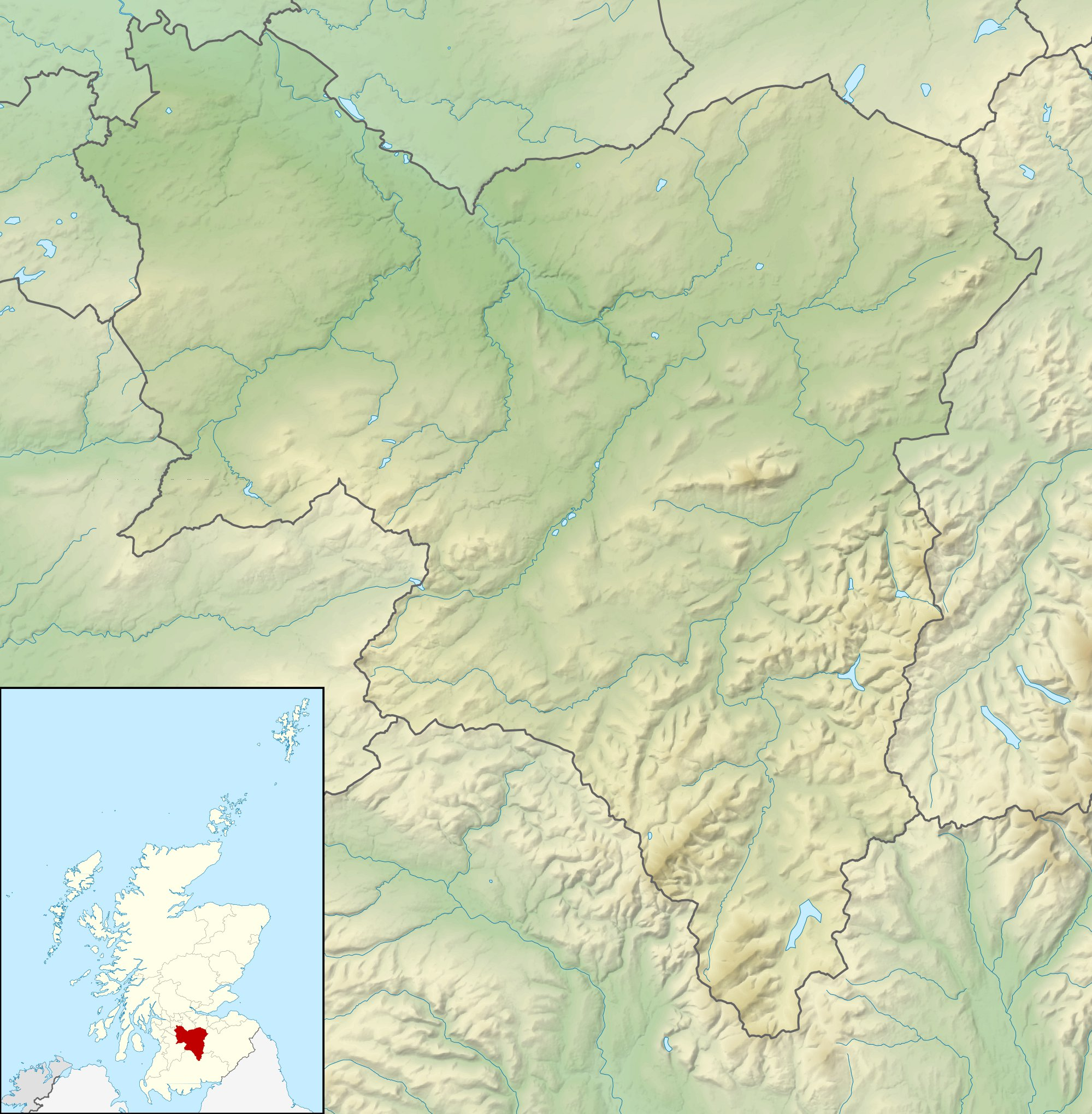
- Location within South Lanarkshire Location within Scotland
- Location: South Lanarkshire, Scotland
- Parent range: Culter Hills, Southern Uplands
- OS grid: NT 05286 29080
- Topo map: OS Landranger 72

Culter Fell is a hill in the Culter Hills range, part of the Southern Uplands of Scotland. It is the county top of the historic county of Lanarkshire, as well as the highest point in South Lanarkshire council area. It is the culmination of a network of ridges that lie south of the village of Coulter, close to the town of Biggar.

It is probably most easily climbed from the north west. The best starting point is the mouth of Kings Beck, at NT 031305. Earlier OSGB topographic maps show a public road at this location, but the most recent maps show only a private road, and there are notices threatening to remove unauthorised vehicles. Cars should therefore be parked at Birthwood, 500 metres further back. It is tempting to walk up the track leading up the Kings Beck, but the direct route up the north west ridge is much easier. The slope is smooth and dry, the vegetation is short, and although there is no constructed footpath, helpful steps have been cut by the boots of previous climbers.

There is an alternative starting point at Glenkirk, to the east (NT077295). From here, a circular route along a ridge including Chapelgill Hill is among several additional options.

There is extensive sheep farming and sporting activity in the area, so care should be taken when accessing Culter Fell in the spring or late summer.

From the summit, the view on a clear day stretches from the Cumbrian Lake District to the Scottish Highlands.
