= Wyke Farms =

UK dairy products company

- Industry: Dairy farming
- Founder: John Clothier
- Headquarters: Wyke Champflower, Somerset, England
- Products: Cheese and butter
- Production output: 18,000 tonnes of cheddar
- Revenue: £149.5million
- Operating income: £10.9million
- Net income: £10.48million
- Total assets: £83.44million
- Number of employees: 276
- Website: www.wykefarms.com

Wyke Farms is a producer of cheese and butter in Somerset. Wyke Farms is the largest independent producer of cheese within the United Kingdom.

== History ==
The Clothier family have farmed the land of Somerset for over 200 years. The original cheese recipe was created by Ivy Clothier (1908-1987) as a hobby. Ivy Clothier used her husband's first cow herd to produce cheese. The recipe became well known in local areas and she later bought milk from other farms. She won many awards for her cheese, the first being in 1952. Ivy's recipe is still used today. Ivy had two sons James 'Jim' Clothier (1930-2002) and John Clothier (born 1943) who later become Chairman of Wyke Farms. John Clothier was, in 1947, introduced to the business side of the farm by his father, Tom Clothier (1906-1986) and his brother Jim. Tom took John to markets where he learnt how markets worked which was essential in running a business. By the age of ten years old, John was allowed to bid, buy and sell cattle and pigs. John Clothier left Tom Clothier and Sons to create the Wyke Farmhouse Cheddar company in 1980 but by 1992 the brand name was changed again to Wyke Farms as it fitted in the packaging better. Now Wyke Farms sells cheese to over 150 countries worldwide and brings in a turnover of over £100million. In June 2020, John Clothier retired as Chairman of Wyke Farms after working at the farm for over 70 years, Paul Hardwick took on the role of Chairman.

== Production ==
With help from UK Trade & Investment, the family-run business was able to export its products to more than 160 countries. The company started expanding internationally in 1997. The cheese and butter are partially made with milk from cows that graze in the Mendip Hills in Somerset. There is a herd of 1,000 cows which produce the milk and the company also uses milk from cows in nearby farms. In 2015, it was announced that the company expects to "quadruple international sales" by 2019. The farm currently farms just over 1,700. It is the largest independent cheese maker and milk processor in the UK, turning out over 17,000 tonnes of cheddar.

The waste of cows and pigs are used to power the farm, rather than electricity from the national grid. It took 5 years to finish building the biogas plant.

Diane Cox is employed by Wyke Farms for her ability to smell and taste cheese. Her employers pay £25,000 p.a. to insure her nose. She is able to infer which cheese will become a high quality vintage cheddar. Cox consumes multiple times more cheese for her work than a typical British adult.

In 2019, Wyke Farms announced that they were going to expand the dairy. The new dairy would be 'super efficient and increase production from 17,000 to 40,000 tonnes of cheese a year'.

Wyke Farms made a pre-tax profit of £4.1m for the financial year ending 31 March 2021 which is £900,000 more than the year before, Wyke Farms also achieved a turnover of £114.92million.
