= Clyde Wind Farm =

Wind farm in South Lanarkshire, Scotland

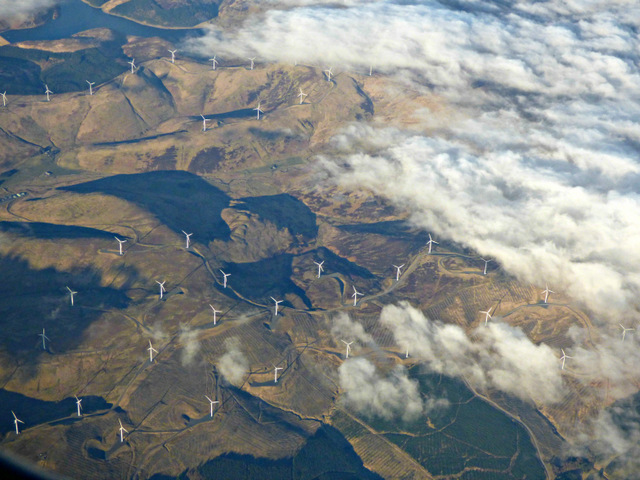
- Country: United Kingdom
- Location: near Abington, South Lanarkshire
- Coordinates: 55°28′02″N 3°39′16″W
- Status: Operational
- Commission date: 2 January 2012
- Owners: GLIL Infrastructure; Greencoat UK Wind; SSE Renewables

Wind farm
- Type: Onshore
- Rotor diameter: 82.4 m (270 ft)

Power generation
- Units operational: 152 × 2.3 MW; 54 × 3.2 MW
- Make and model: Siemens Gamesa SWT-2.3-82 VS (152); Siemens Gamesa SWT-3.2-101 (54)
- Nameplate capacity: 522 MW

External links
- Commons: Related media on Commons

The Clyde Wind Farm is a 522 megawatt (MW) wind farm near Abington in South Lanarkshire, Scotland.

== Planning ==
The first stage of the project consists of 152 turbines by Scottish and Southern Energy and was approved by the Scottish Parliament in July 2008. It is capable of powering 200,000 homes. SSE was given planning permission to build a wind farm with turbines built on either side of the M74 motorway.

== Construction ==
Construction of the wind farm, which was budgeted for £600 million, began in early 2009 and finished in 2012. Welcon Towers Ltd won the contract to supply the towers for all 152 turbines for the £600 million Clyde Wind Farm. Jesper Øhlenschlæger, chief executive officer of Welcon Towers parent company Skykon, said: "The Clyde project is a very important business win for our Campbeltown manufacturing. Scotland has become the most positive and the most interesting renewable wind power market in Europe. The Clyde Wind Farm project represents a landmark phase in Scotland’s renewable energy strategy."

The first stage of the farm was opened at a ceremonial ribbon cutting by First Minister of Scotland Alex Salmond in September 2012. Its original capacity was 349.6 MW.

== Extension ==
In July 2014 it was announced that Scottish ministers had approved an extension to the Clyde Wind Farm. The extension will see 54 extra turbines, capable of generating an additional 162 MW. This will bring the total generating capacity of the wind farm to 512 MW. The extension has been upgraded to 54 turbines with a 173 MW capacity and was commissioned in the summer of 2017.

== See also ==
- Wind power in Scotland
- List of onshore wind farms in the United Kingdom
- List of offshore wind farms in the United Kingdom
