= Hadyard Hill Wind Farm =

Wind farm in South Ayrshire, Scotland

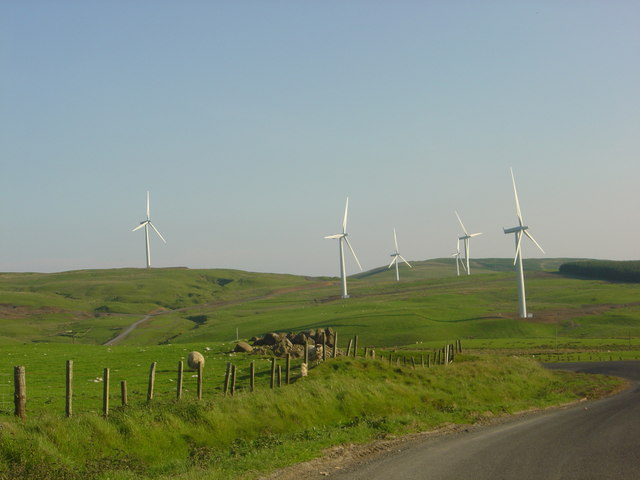
- Hadyard Hill wind farm. Located on the B734 between Old Dailly and Barr.
- Country: Scotland, United Kingdom
- Location: east of Girvan, South Ayrshire
- Coordinates: 55°14′45″N 04°43′23″W
- Status: Operational
- Commission date: March 2006
- Owner: Scottish & Southern

Wind farm
- Type: Onshore

Power generation
- Units operational: 52 x 2.3 MW
- Make and model: Bonus 2.3MW turbines
- Nameplate capacity: 130 MW

External links
- Website: www.sserenewables.com/onshore-wind/great-britain/hadyard-hill/
- Commons: Related media on Commons

Hadyard Hill Wind Farm is located in Carrick district of South Ayrshire. Costing £85 million, the wind farm consists of 52 three-bladed Siemens wind turbines, each capable of generating 2.3 megawatts (MW) of power, giving a total output of 120 MW. This was Britain's most powerful wind farm when it was commissioned in March 2006.

The diameter of the blades is 80 metres (262 feet) and each turbine is mounted on tubular steel towers. The wind farm includes three permanent 60 metres (197-feet) high anemometer towers to monitor wind speeds, and is connected by a high-voltage overhead transmission line, which connects to the national electricity network at Maybole.

The farm is operated by Scottish and Southern Energy Generation Ltd.

== See also ==
- Wind power in Scotland
- List of onshore wind farms
- Operational wind farms
