= List of onshore wind farms in the United Kingdom =

This is a list of some onshore wind farms (more than one turbine) in the UK. This information is gathered from multiple Internet sources, primarily the UK Wind Energy Database from RenewableUK (formerly BWEA) and The Wind Power's database. There are many operational wind farms missing from the list, such as Scotland's 522 MW Clyde Wind Farm and the 68 MW Keadby Wind Farm in North Lincolnshire, England's largest onshore wind farm. The name of the wind farm is the name used by the energy company when referring to the farm and is usually related to the name of the physical location, e.g. hill, moor, fell, down etc. or the name of the agricultural farm for the smaller installations on property owned by farmers. The "wind farm" part is implied and hence removed for clarity in most cases. Listings here are restricted to wind farms with 12 turbines or more; for a more comprehensive list, please see the individual country articles.

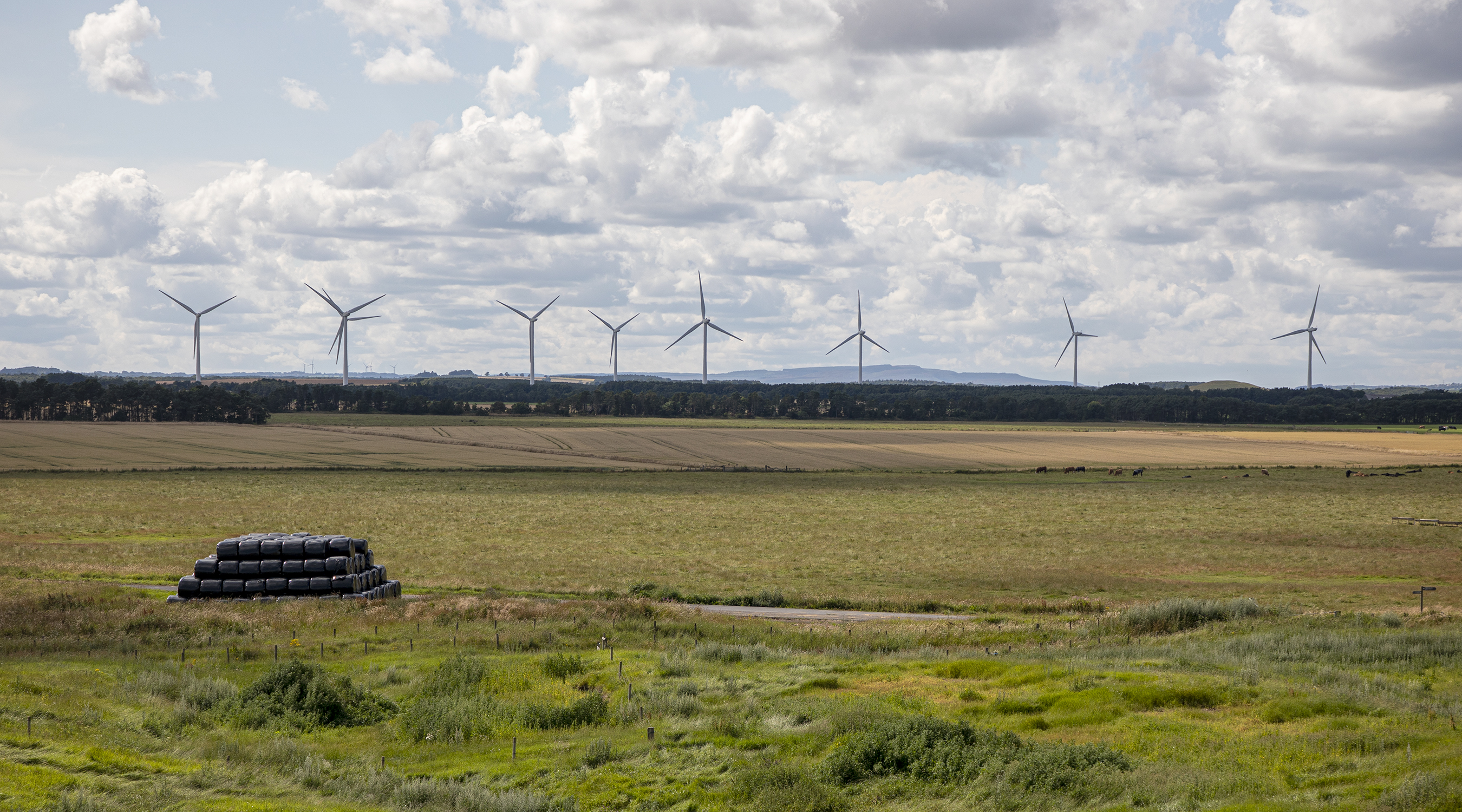
North Steads Wind Farm from Druridge Bay

== England ==
Onshore wind farms in England
Wind farm	County	Coordinates	Model	Power per turbine (MW)	No.	Cap. (MW)	Online	Developer	Operator	Owner	Website
Red Tile	Cambridgeshire	52°27′02″N 00°00′27″W	REpower MM82	2.00	12	24.00	2007	Wind Prospect	Cumbria Wind Farms	EDF EN	
Frodsham	Cheshire	53°17′46″N 02°45′28″W	Nordex N90/2650	2.65	19	50.35	2017	Peel Wind Power Ltd	-		
Bears Down	Cornwall	50°28′23″N 04°57′11″W	Bonus B600	0.60	16	9.60	2001	npower renewables	Innogy	Innogy	
Cold Northcott	Cornwall (Note: Due to a number of reasons the active number of turbines has decreased from 22 to 19. There are also plans for a full scale repowering of the farm to replace the 0.3 MW turbines with modern 1 MW turbines increasing the farms output to 22 MW.)	50°38′14″N 04°31′07″W	WEG MS3-300	0.30	19 (22)	5.70 (6.80)	1993	First Windfarm Holdings Ltd	EDF Energy	First Wind Farm Holdings	
Four Burrows	Cornwall	50°17′30″N 05°08′44″W	Bonus B300	0.30	15	4.50	1998	Ecogen Ltd	RES	RES	
West Durham	County Durham	54°46′05″N 01°49′18″W	REpower MM82	2.00	12	24.00	2009	Banks Developments	-	ESB Group	
Kirkby Moor	Cumbria	54°14′46″N 03°09′08″W	Vestas WD34	0.40	12	4.80	1993	npower renewables	Innogy	Beaufort Wind Limited	
Goole Fields 1	East Riding of Yorkshire	53°40′58″N 00°47′41″W	Senvion MM92	2.05	16	32.8	2014	RWE	RWE	RWE	
Goole Fields 2	East Riding of Yorkshire	53°40′58″N 00°47′41″W	Senvion MM92	2.05	17	34.85	2017	RWE	RWE	RWE	
Hall Farm	East Riding of Yorkshire	53°52′1.8″N 00°22′15.8″W	REpower MM82	2.05	12	24.6	2013	Blue Energy	-	John Laing Investments	
Lissett Airfield	East Riding of Yorkshire	54°00′35″N 00°15′15″W	Nordex N90	2.50	12	30.00	2009	Novera	-	-	
Little Cheyne Court	Kent	50°57′45″N 00°49′13″E	Nordex N90	2.30	26	59.80	2009	npower renewables	-	-	
Coal Clough (Note: Coal Clough Wind Farm was repowered in April 2015 data in brackets is prior to the repowering.)	Lancashire	53°44′55″N 02°10′03″W	Gamesa G80/2000 (Vestas WD34)	2 (0.40)	8 (24)	16 (9.60)	2015 (1992)	RES	B9 Energy	ScottishPower, SWEB, RES	
Scout Moor	Greater Manchester & Lancashire	53°40′01″N 02°16′26″W	Nordex N80	2.50	26	65.00	2008	Peel Wind Power Ltd	-	Peel Wind Power Ltd	
Hyndburn	Lancashire	53°42′52″N 02°23′10″W	REpower MM82	2.05	12	24.6	2012	Energiekontor	-	-	
Bicker Fen	Lincolnshire	52°55′34″N 00°12′59″W	REpower MM82	2.00	13	26.00	2008	Wind Prospect	Cumbria Wind Farms	EDF EN	
Conisholme Fen Resubmission	Lincolnshire	53°25′32″N 00°04′48″W	Enercon E48	0.80	20	16.00	2008	Ecotricity	Ecotricity	Ecotricity	
Rusholme	North Yorkshire	53°43′32″N 00°55′15″W	REpower MM82	2.00	12	24.00	2010	Wind Prospect	EDF EN	EDF EN	
Green Rigg	Northumberland	55°05′56″N 02°11′55″W	Vestas V80	2	18	36	2012	EdF	EDF EN	EDF Energy	
Royd Moor	South Yorkshire	53°31′55″N 01°40′10″W	Bonus M1500-500	0.50	13	6.50	1993	E.ON UK Renewables	B9 Energy	E.ON Renewables	

== Northern Ireland ==
Onshore wind farms in Northern Ireland
Wind farm	County	Coordinates	Model	Power per turbine (MW)	No.	Cap. (MW)	Online	Developer	Operator	Owner	Website
Altahullion Phase I	County Londonderry	54°57′36″N 07°01′54″W	Bonus B1300	1.30	20	26.00	2003	RES Ltd and B9 Energy	B9 Energy	RES-GEN	
Altahullion Phase II	County Londonderry	54°57′38″N 07°01′58″W	Siemens SWT-1.3	1.30	9	11.70	2007	RES UK & Ireland Ltd	B9 Energy	RES-GEN	
Bessy Bell	County Tyrone	54°40′48″N 07°24′12″W	Vestas V39	0.50	10	5.00	1995	Column Energy	B9 Energy	E.ON Renewables	
Bessy Bell Extension	County Tyrone	54°43′21″N 07°22′29″W	GE 1.5s	1.50	6	9.00	2008	Airtricity	-	Airtricity	
Bin Mountain	County Tyrone	54°42′18″N 07°35′28″W	GE 1.5s	1.50	6	9.00	2007	Airtricity	Airtricity	Airtricity	
Callagheen	County Fermanagh	54°26′18″N 08°00′30″W	Siemens SWT-1.3	1.30	13	16.90	2005	RES Ltd and B9 Energy	B9 Energy	ScottishPower	;
Corkey	County Antrim	55°02′00″N 06°15′24″W	Nordtank NTK500	0.50	10	5.00	1994	RES Ltd and B9 Energy	B9 Energy	ScottishPower	;
Corlacky Hill	County Londonderry	54°53′53.9″N 06°43′26.8″W	Vestas V117	4.3	11	47.00	2025	RES Ltd and Erg	RES	-	
Elliot's Hill	County Antrim	54°51′00″N 06°03′36″W	Vestas V39	0.50	10	5.00	1995	RES Ltd and B9 Energy	B9 Energy	ScottishPower	;
Garves Mountain/Dunloy	Antrim	55°15′58″N 6°26′35.6″W	Vestas V90	3.00	5	15.00	2009	Your Energy	Engineering Renewables	Garves Wind Farm Ltd	
Gruig	County Antrim	55°01′32″N 06°14′58″W	Nordex N80	2.50	10	25.00	2009	RES UK & Ireland Ltd	-	-	
Hunter's Hill	County Tyrone	54°27′01″N 07°18′25″W	Nordex N80	2.50	8	20.00	2010	RES UK & Ireland Ltd	B9 Energy	ESB Group	
Lendrum's Bridge Phase I	County Tyrone	54°26′12″N 07°20′42″W	Vestas V47	0.66	9	5.94	2000	RES Ltd and B9 Energy	B9 Energy	RES	
Lendrum's Bridge Phase II	County Tyrone	54°26′12″N 07°20′42″W	Vestas V47	0.66	11	7.30	2002	RES Ltd and B9 Energy	B9 Energy	RES	
Lough Hill Resubmission	County Tyrone	54°37′37″N 07°36′21″W	Siemens SWT-1.3	1.30	6	7.80	2007	RES Ltd and B9 Energy	-	RES-GEN	
Owenreagh	County Tyrone	54°48′30″N 07°19′54″W	Zond Z40	0.50	10	5.00	1997	EF Energy	South Western Services	South Western Services	
Owenreagh Extension	County Tyrone	54°48′30″N 07°19′54″W	Vestas V52	0.85	6	5.10	2008	EF Energy	South Western Services	South Western Services	
Rigged Hill	County Londonderry	55°01′18″N 06°49′13″W	Nordtank NTK500	0.50	10	5.00	1995	RES Ltd and B9 Energy	B9 Energy	ScottishPower	;
Slieve Divena 1	County Tyrone	54°30′27″N 07°06′19″W	Nordex N80	2.50	12	30.00	2009	RES UK & Ireland Ltd	SSE Renewables	SSE Renewables	
Slieve Rushen Repowering	County Fermanagh	54°09′36″N 07°37′12″W	Vestas V90	3.00	18	54.00	2008	Sean Quinn Group	-	-	
Tappaghan Mountain	County Fermanagh	54°32′53″N 07°33′14″W	GE 1.5s	1.50	13	19.50	2005	Airtricity	GE Wind	Airtricity	
Tappaghan Mountain Extension	County Fermanagh	54°32′53″N 07°33′14″W	GE 1.5s	1.50	6	9.00	2009	SSE Renewables	-	-	
Wolf Bog	County Antrim	54°48′11″N 06°05′39″W	Vestas V80	2.00	5	10.00	2007	RES UK & Ireland Ltd	B9 Energy	ScottishPower	;

== Scotland ==
Onshore wind farms in Scotland
Wind farm	County	Coordinates	Model	Power per turbine (MW)	No.	Cap. (MW)	Online	Developer	Operator	Owner	Website
Aikengall	East Lothian	55°55′36″N 02°27′28″W	Vestas V90	3.00	16	48.00	2009	Community Windpower	Community Windpower	Community Windpower	
Dalry	North Ayrshire	55°42′38″N 04°43′24″W	Vestas V90	3.00	6	18.00	2006	Community Windpower	Community Windpower	Community Windpower	
Millour Hill Extension	North Ayrshire	55°44′29″N 004°46′56″W	Siemens Direct Drive	3.2	2	6.4	2016	Community Windpower	Community Windpower	Community Windpower	
Millour Hill	North Ayrshire	55°44′29″N 004°46′56″W	Siemens Direct Drive	3	6	18	2012	Community Windpower	Community Windpower	Community Windpower	
Calder Water	South Lanarkshire	55°38′40″N 004°12′33″W	Siemens Direct Drive	3	13	39	2013	Community Windpower	Community Windpower	Community Windpower	
Aikengall IIa	East Lothian and Scottish Borders	55°53′57″N 002°27′43″W	Siemens Gamesa SWT-DD-120	4.3	19	81.7	2021	Community Windpower	Community Windpower	Community Windpower	
Aikengall II	East Lothian	55°53′57″N 002°27′43″W	Siemens Direct Drive	3.2	19	60.8	2017	Community Windpower	Community Windpower	Community Windpower	
Sanquhar	Dumfries and Galloway	55°20′40″N 004°02′25″W	Vestas V112	3.6	9	31.05	2018	Community Windpower	Community Windpower	Community Windpower	
Boyndie Airfield	Aberdeenshire	57°38′47″N 02°36′17″W	Enercon E82	2.00	7	14.00	2006	RDC	Falck Renewables	Falck Renewables	
Cairnmore	Aberdeenshire	57°18′30″N 02°49′30″W	Vestas V52	0.85	3	2.55	2010	Greenspan Electric Cairnmore Ltd	-	-	
Dummuie	Aberdeenshire	57°24′46″N 02°43′42″W	Vestas V66	1.75	7	10.40	2007	Eco2	Eco2	Englefield Renewable Energy Fund	;
Glens of Foudland	Aberdeenshire	57°25′28″N 02°38′34″W	Bonus B1300	1.30	20	26.00	2005	RES	-	Centrica Renewable Energy Ltd	
Hill of Balquhindachy (Extension)	Aberdeenshire	57°28′23″N 02°14′19″W	Vestas V52	0.85	2	1.70	2009	Grant Mackie	-	Greenspan Energy	
Hill of Eastertown	Aberdeenshire	57°22′21″N 02°24′7″W	Vestas V52	0.85	3	2.55	2007	-	-	Mackies Icecream Factories	
Hill of Fiddes	Aberdeenshire	57°18′56″N 02°06′52″W	Enercon E70	2.30	3	6.90	2010	Broadview Energy	-	-	
Hill of Skelmonae	Aberdeenshire	57°26′56″N 02°11′21″W	Enercon E48	0.80	4	3.20	2009	-	-	-	
House O Hill	Aberdeenshire	57°37′02″N 02°02′27″W	Enercon E48	0.80	3	2.40	2010	-	-	-	
North Redbog	Aberdeenshire	57°35′09″N 02°00′21″W	Enercon E48	0.80	2	1.60	2008	Redbog Renewables Ltd.	Enercon	Redbog Renewables Ltd	
St John's Wells	Aberdeenshire	57°25′22″N 02°20′04″W	Enercon E48	0.80	3	2.40	2009	St John's Wells Wind Farm Limited	-	-	
Strath of Brydock	Aberdeenshire	57°37′45″N 02°35′07″W	Enercon E70	2.30	2	4.60	2009	A.J. Duncan	-	-	
Tullo	Aberdeenshire	56°50′07″N 02°23′59″W	Nordex N80	2.50	7	17.50	2010	-	Eneco	Eneco	
Twinshiels	Aberdeenshire	56.843242°N 2.398279°W	Nordex N80	2.50	10	25.00	2014	-	Eneco	Eneco	
Upper Ardgrain	Aberdeenshire	57°24′02″N 02°04′03″W	Enercon E48	0.80	3	2.40	2010	-	-	-	
Ardkinglas/ Clachan Flats	Argyll and Bute	56°17′16″N 04°56′55″W	Ecotecnia 74	1.67	9	15.03	2009	ScottishPower	-	Iberdrola	
Beinn an Tuirc	Argyll and Bute	55°33′56″N 05°34′12″W	Vestas V47	0.66	46	30.00	2001	ScottishPower	B9 Energy	ScottishPower	
Beinn Ghlas	Argyll and Bute	56°22′59″N 05°16′20″W	Bonus B600	0.60	14	8.40	1999	npower renewables	Innogy	Beaufort Wind Limited	
Cruach Mhor	Argyll and Bute	56°02′24″N 05°09′22″W	Vestas V52	0.85	35	29.75	2004	ScottishPower	B9 Energy	ScottishPower	
Deucheran Hill	Argyll and Bute	55°37′44″N 05°33′35″W	Vestas V66	1.75	9	15.75	2001	E.ON UK Renewables	B9 Energy	E.ON Renewables	
Tangy	Argyll and Bute	55°29′38″N 05°40′45″W	Vestas V52	0.85	22	18.65	2002	SSE plc	SSE plc	SSE plc	
Artfield Fell	Dumfries and Galloway	54°57′58″N 04°45′59″W	Siemens SWT-1.3	1.30	15	19.50	2005	SSE plc	SSE plc	SSE plc	
Craig Wind Farm	Dumfries and Galloway	55°12′46″N 03°06′34″W	Nordex N80	2.50	4	10.00	2007	Craig Wind Farm Co	Craig Wind Farm Company	Craig Wind Farm Company	
Dalswinton, Pennyland Moor	Dumfries and Galloway	55°10′13″N 03°40′25″W	REpower MM82	2.00	15	30.00	2008	Airtricity	-	Airtricity	
Minsca	Dumfries and Galloway	55°06′46″N 03°12′59″W	Siemens SWT-2.3	2.30	16	36.80	2008	Airtricity	-	Airtricity	
North Rhins	Dumfries and Galloway	54°52′55″N 05°05′00″W	Vestas V80	2.00	11	22.00	2010	Wind Energy (North Rhins) Ltd	-	AES Wind Generation	
Wether Hill	Dumfries and Galloway	55°13′20″N 04°02′30″W	Siemens SWT-1.3	1.30	14	18.20	2007	ScottishPower	-	ScottishPower	
Windy Standard	Dumfries and Galloway	55°17′31″N 04°12′18″W	Nordtank NTK600	0.60	36	21.60	1996	npower renewables	Innogy	Innogy	
Michelin Tyre Factory	Dundee City	56°28′59″N 02°53′32″W	Enercon E70	2.00	2	4.00	2006	Ecotricity	Ecotricity	Ecotricity	
Hare Hill	East Ayrshire	55°21′06″N 04°07′04″W	Vestas V47	0.66	20	13.20	2000	ScottishPower	B9 Energy	ScottishPower	;
Myres Hill	East Renfrewshire	55°41′30″N 04°16′42″W	NEG Micon NM52	0.95	2	1.90	2001	Vestas	NEG Micon UK	-	
Whitelee, Eaglesham Moor	East Renfrewshire	55°41′14″N 04°13′43″W	Siemens SWT-2.3	2.30	215	539.00	2009	ScottishPower	-	ScottishPower	
Achairn Farm, Stirkoke	Highland	58°26′14″N 03°11′31″W	REpower MM82	2.05	3	6.15	2009	Innes (James & Ronald)	-	-	
Achany Estate	Highland	58°00′16″N 04°31′54″W	REpower MM82	2.00	19	38.00	2010	SSE Renewables	-	-	
Beinn Tharsuinn	Highland	57°48′06″N 04°19′56″W	Vestas V66	1.75	17	29.75	2006	ScottishPower	-	ScottishPower	
Beinn Tharsuinn Extension	Highland	57°48′06″N 04°19′56″W	Enercon E70	2.30	2	4.60	2009	RockBySea & Midfern Renewables	-	-	
Ben Aketil	Highland	57°25′45″N 06°27′18″W	Enercon E70	2.30	10	23.00	2007	RDC	Falck Renewables	Falck Renewables	
Ben Aketil Extension	Highland	57°25′38″N 06°26′55″W	Enercon E70	2.30	2	4.60	2010	Falck Renewables		Falck Renewables	
Bilbster (Watten)	Highland	58°28′19″N 03°18′48″W	Nordex N60	1.30	3	3.90	2008	npower renewables	Innogy	Innogy	
Boulfruich	Highland	58°18′0″N 03°26′00″W	Vestas V52	0.85	15	13.00	2005	Anthony & Kathryn Hall	-	Anthony & Kathryn Hall	
Causeymire	Highland	58°25′46″N 03°30′31″W	Bonus B2300	2.30	21	48.30	2004	npower renewables	Innogy	Innogy	
Edinbane	Highland	57°25′45″N 06°25′18″W	Enercon E70	2.30	18	41.40	2009	Vattenfall	-	-	
Fairburn Estate	Highland	57°31′47″N 04°38′47″W	REpower MM82	2.00	20	40.00	2010	SSE Renewables	-	-	
Farr Wind Farm	Highland	57°19′30″N 04°05′39″W	Bonus B2300	2.30	40	92.00	2006	npower renewables	Innogy	Innogy	
Forss Extension	Highland	58°36′28″N 03°40′11″W	Siemens SWT-1.3	1.30	4	5.20	2007	RES	-	-	
Forss, Hill of Lybster	Highland	58°36′28″N 03°40′03″W	Bonus	1.00	2	2.00	2003	RES	RES	-	
Gordonbush	Highland	58°06′31″N 03°55′45″W	REpower MM82	2.05	35	71.75	2012	SSE Renewables	SSE plc	SSE plc	
Gigha Community	Highland	55°40′05″N 05°45′16″W	Vestas V27	0.225	3	0.68	2004	Gigha Renewable Energy Company	Gigha Renewable Energy Ltd	Isle of Gigha Heritage Trust	
Kilbraur (Strathbrora)	Highland	58°02′52″N 04°07′40″W	Nordex N90	2.50	19	47.50	2008	RDC	Falck Renewables	Falck Renewables	
Millennium (Glenmoriston)	Highland	57°08′04″N 04°49′56″W	Nordex N90	2.50	16	40.00	2008	RDC	Falck Renewables	Falck Renewables	
Millennium Extension (Glenmoriston)	Highland	57°08′04″N 04°49′56″W	Nordex N90	2.50	4	10.00	2008	WCE	Falck Renewables	Falck Renewables	
Novar	Highland	57°42′52″N 04°26′03″W	Bonus B500	0.50	34	17.00	1997	npower renewables	Innogy	Beaufort Wind Limited	
Findhorn Foundation Extension	Moray	57°39′26″N 03°34′48″W	Vestas V29	0.225	3	0.75	2006	Findhorn Foundation	-	-	
Paul's Hill	Moray	57°26′46″N 03°28′34″W	Bonus B2300	2.30	28	64.40	2006	Fred Olsen Renewables	Natural Power/Fred Olsen	Fred Olsen Renewables Ltd	
Rothes (Cairn Uish)	Moray	57°32′14″N 03°22′17″W	Bonus B2300	2.30	22	50.60	2005	Fred Olsen Renewables	Natural Power/Fred Olsen	Fred Olsen Renewables Ltd	
Ardrossan	North Ayrshire	55°41′09″N 04°48′26″W	Vestas V80	2.00	12	24.00	2004	Airtricity	Infinis	Infinis	
Ardrossan Extension	North Ayrshire	55°41′09″N 04°48′26″W	Vestas V80	2.00	3	6.00	2004	Infinis	Infinis	-	
Hagshaw Hill Extension	North Lanarkshire	55°33′22″N 03°54′03″W	Siemens SWT-1.3	1.30	20	26.00	2008	ScottishPower	-	ScottishPower	
Bu Farm	Orkney	59°04′59″N 02°39′53″W	GE Wind 900S	0.90	3	2.70	2002	Farm Energy	I & H Brown	I & H Brown	
Burgar Hill	Orkney	59°07′13″N 03°08′45″W	Nordex N80	2.50	2	5.00	2007	npower renewables	Innogy	Innogy	
Hammars Hill	Orkney	59°05′41″N 03°04′31″W	Enercon E44	0.90	5	4.50	2010	Hammars Hill Energy Ltd	-	-	
Spurness Wind Farm	Orkney	59°11′10″N 02°41′22″W	NEG Micon NM80	2.75	3	8.25	2005	Your Energy	-	SSE plc	
Drumderg	Perth and Kinross	56°40′46″N 03°21′23″W	Siemens SWT-2.3	2.30	16	36.80	2008	SSE plc	-	-	
Green Knowes	Perth and Kinross	56°14′56″N 03°40′01″W	Acciona AW1500	1.50	18	27.00	2008	ScottishPower	-	ScottishPower	
Toddleburn	Scottish Borders	55°46′20″N 02°48′24″W	Siemens SWT-2.3	2.30	12	27.60	2010	SSE Renewables	-	SSE Renewables	
Black Hill	Scottish Borders	55°47′54″N 02°26′02″W	Siemens SWT-1.3	1.30	22	28.60	2007	RES	-	RES	
Bowbeat	Scottish Borders	55°42′56″N 03°08′23″W	Nordex N60	1.30	24	31.20	2002	E.ON UK Renewables	E.ON Renewables	E.ON Renewables	
Carcant	Scottish Borders	55°45′42″N 03°00′49″W	Siemens	2.00	3	6.00	2010	AMEC Wind	SSE Renewables	SSE Renewables	
Crystal Rig	Scottish Borders	55°53′42″N 02°30′47″W	Nordex N80	2.50	20	50.00	2004	Fred Olsen Renewables	Natural Power/Fred Olsen	Fred Olsen Renewables Ltd	
Crystal Rig1a	Scottish Borders	55°53′42″N 02°30′47″W	Nordex N80	2.50	5	12.50	2007	Fred Olsen Renewables	-	Fred Olsen Renewables Ltd	
Crystal Rig2 & 2a	Scottish Borders	55°54′20″N 02°33′00″W	Siemens SWT-2.3	2.30	60	138.00	2010	Fred Olsen Renewables	Natural Power/Fred Olsen	Fred Olsen Renewables Ltd	
Dun Law	Scottish Borders	55°48′27″N 02°51′37″W	Vestas V47	0.66	26	17.60	2000	ScottishPower	B9 Energy	ScottishPower	;
Dun Law Extension	Scottish Borders	55°48′27″N 02°51′37″W	Vestas V52	0.85	35	29.75	2009	RES	-	ScottishPower	
Longpark	Scottish Borders	55°40′23″N 02°50′11″W	REpower MM82	2.00	19	38.00	2009	Wind Prospect	Cumbria Wind Farms	EDF EN	
Burradale Phase 1	Shetland Islands	60°09′53″N 01°14′10″W	Vestas V47	0.66	3	1.98	2000	Shetland Aerogenerators	Shetland Aerogenerators Ltd	Shetland Aerogenerators	
Burradale Phase 2	Shetland Islands	60°09′53″N 01°14′10″W	Vestas V52	0.85	2	1.70	2003	Shetland Aerogenerators	Shetland Aerogenerators Ltd	Shetland Aerogenerators	
Arecleoch	South Ayrshire	55°03′12″N 04°52′56″W	Gamesa G80	2.00	60	120.00	2011	–	ScottishPower	ScottishPower Renewables	
Hadyard Hill, Barr	South Ayrshire	55°14′45″N 04°43′23″W	Bonus B2300	2.30	52	120.00	2006	SSE plc	SSE plc	SSE plc	
Black Law Phase I	South Lanarkshire	55°46′01″N 03°44′20″W	Siemens SWT-2.3	2.30	44	97.00	2005	ScottishPower	-	ScottishPower	
Black Law Phase II	South Lanarkshire	55°46′01″N 03°44′20″W	Siemens SWT-2.3	2.30	12	27.60	2006	ScottishPower	-	ScottishPower	
Greendykeside Wind Farm	South Lanarkshire	55°54′30″N 03°54′07″W	REpower MM82	2.00	2	4.00	2007	A7 Energy Ltd	Wind Prospect	-	
Hagshaw Hill	South Lanarkshire	55°33′02″N 03°55′06″W	Bonus B600	0.60	26	15.60	1995	Eurus Energy/Ecogen Ltd	Ingenco	ScottishPower	
Lochhead Farm	South Lanarkshire	55°42′17″N 03°56′46″W	REpower MM82	2.05	3	6.15	2009	A7 Energy Ltd	-	-	
Braes of Doune	Stirling	56°16′34″N 04°03′45″W	Vestas V80	2.00	36	72.00	2007	Airtricity	-	Airtricity/Centrica	
Burnfoot Hill	Stirling	56°12′41″N 03°46′01″W	REpower MM82	2.00	13	26.00	2010	Wind Prospect	EDF EN	-	
Craigengelt	Stirling	56°03′07″N 04°02′23″W	Nordex N80	2.50	8	20.00	2010	GDF SUEZ Energy UK	-	-	
Earlsburn	Stirling	56°05′00″N 04°05′00″W	Nordex N80	2.50	15	37.50	2007	RDC	Falck Renewables	Falck Renewables	
Rhodders	Stirling	56°09′14″N 03°44′24″W	Senvion MM82	2.05	6	12.3	2016	EDF EN	EDF EN	-	
Pates Hill	West Lothian	55°48′32″N 03°35′57″W	Vestas V80	2.00	7	14.00	2010	Your Energy	Engineering Renewables	Winscales Moor Wind Farm Ltd	
Arnish Moor	Western Isles	58°10′42″N 06°25′39″W	Nordex N60	1.30	3	3.90	2007	Farm Energy	Farm Energy	John Moulton	,

== Wales ==
Onshore wind farms in Wales
Wind farm	County	Coordinates	Model	Power per turbine (MW)	No.	Cap. (MW)	Online	Developer	Operator	Owner	Website
Alltwalis (formerly Blaengwen)	Carmarthenshire	51°58′42″N 04°15′03″W	Siemens SWT-2.3	2.30	10	23.00	2009	Statkraft Wind UK Ltd	-	-	
Blaen Bowi	Carmarthenshire	51°59′17″N 04°26′43″W	Nordex N60	1.30	3	3.90	2002	Windjen Power Ltd	Windjen Power Ltd	Windjen Power Ltd	
Braich Ddu Farm	Gwynedd	52°57′42″N 03°28′04″W	Nordex N60	1.30	3	3.90	2008	REG Windpower	-	-	
Bryn Titli	Powys	52°22′03″N 03°33′51″W	Bonus B450	0.45	22	9.90	1994	npower renewables	Innogy	Beaufort Wind Limited	
Carno ’A’ & ’B’	Powys	52°33′02″N 03°36′01″W	Bonus B600	0.60	56	33.60	1996	npower renewables	Innogy	Beaufort Wind Limited	
Carno Extension	Powys	52°33′02″N 03°36′01″W	Siemens SWT-1.3	1.30	12	15.60	2009	Amegni	-	-	
Castle Pill Farm Repowering	Pembrokeshire	52°03′39″N 03°39′25″W	EWT 900	0.90	4	3.20	2009	Infinergy	-	-	
Cefn Croes	Ceredigion	52°24′18″N 03°45′03″W	GE 1.5se	1.50	39	58.50	2005	Falck Renewables	RDC / Falck Renewables	Falck Renewables	
Cemmaes	Powys	52°38′38″N 03°40′45″W	Vestas V52	0.85	18	15.30	2002	First Windfarm Holdings Ltd	Cumbria Wind Farms	First Wind Farm Holdings	
Dyffryn Brodyn	Ceredigion	51°52′09″N 04°33′25″W	Nordtank NTK500	0.50	11	5.50	1994	New World Power	RES	RES	
Ffynnon Oer	Neath Port Talbot	51°54′00″N 03°10′00″W	REpower MM70	2.00	16	32.00	2006	npower renewables	Innogy	Innogy	
Hafoty Ucha 2 Extension	Gwynedd	52°54′01″N 03°35′18″W	Vestas V52	0.85	2	1.70	2002	Tegni	Tegni	Tegni	
Llandinam P&L	Powys	52°26′11″N 03°24′49″W	Mitsubishi	0.30	103	30.90	1992	ScottishPower/Eurus Energy	SKM	ScottishPower/Eurus Energy	
Llangwyryfon	Ceredigion	52°18′26″N 04°01′43″W	Vestas V52	0.85	11	9.35	2004	First Windfarm Holdings Ltd	Cumbria Wind Farms	First Wind Farm Holdings	
Llyn Alaw	Anglesey	53°21′48″N 04°26′59″W	Bonus B600	0.60	34	20.40	1997	npower renewables	Innogy	Beaufort Wind Limited	
Moel Maelogen	Conwy	53°08′08″N 03°43′24″W	Bonus B1300	1.30	3	2.60	2002	Cwmni Gwynt Teg Cyf	GT O+M	Cwmni Gwynt Teg Cyf	
Moel Maelogen Extension	Conwy	53°08′08″N 03°43′24″W	Siemens SWT-1.3	1.30	9	11.70	2008	Ail Wynt Cyf	-	-	
Mynydd Clogau	Powys	52°34′49″N 03°25′59″W	Vestas V52	0.85	17	14.45	2006	Novera	SKM	Novera Energy plc	
Mynydd Gorddu	Ceredigion	52°27′18″N 03°58′20″W	NEG Micon M1500-500	0.50	19	10.20	1998	Amgen	Innogy	Beaufort Wind Limited	
Parc Cynog	Carmarthenshire	51°45′33″N 04°32′40″W	NEG Micon	0.72	5	3.60	2001	Nuon Renewables	Nuon Renewables	Nuon Renewables	
Pen y Cymoedd	Rhondda Cynon Taff	51°42′40″N 03°33′43″W	Siemens Gamesa SWT-3.0	3.0	76	228	2017	Vattenfall	Vattenfall	Vattenfall	
Pendine (Parc Cynog Extension I)	Carmarthenshire	51°45′33″N 04°32′40″W	Enercon E48	0.80	6	4.80	2009	Nuon Renewables	Nuon Renewables	Nuon Renewables	
Rheidol	Ceredigion	52°24′12″N 03°52′56″W	Bonus B300	0.30	8	2.40	1997	E.ON UK Renewables	RES	E.ON Renewables	;
Rhyd-y-Groes	Anglesey	53°24′46″N 04°25′54″W	Bonus B300	0.30	24	7.20	1992	E.ON UK Renewables	B9 Energy	E.ON Renewables	
Solutia UK Ltd	Pembrokeshire	51°33′53″N 02°57′34″W	Nordex N90	2.50	2	5.00	2009	Wind Direct	-	Wind Direct Ltd	
Taff Ely	Rhondda Cynon Taff	51°33′46″N 03°29′09″W	Nordtank NTK450/500	0.45	20	9.00	1993	Perma Energy	Innogy	Beaufort Wind Limited	
Tir Mostyn & Foel Goch	Denbighshire	53°06′52″N 03°29′17″W	Gamesa G52	0.85	25	21.25	2005	Windjen Power Ltd	-	HgCapital	
Trysglwyn	Anglesey	53°22′28″N 04°20′43″W	Bonus	0.40	14	5.60	1996	npower renewables	Innogy	Beaufort Wind Limited	
Wern Ddu (Craig Lelo)	Denbighshire	53°00′28″N 03°22′48″W	Enercon E70	2.30	4	9.20	2010	Tegni	-	-	

Totals
Country	No. of turbines	Total capacity (GW)
England	1,999	2.93
Northern Ireland	1,302	1.33
Scotland	4,464	8.56
Wales	998	1.25
Whole of UK	8,763	14.07

== See also ==
- List of offshore wind farms in the United Kingdom
- Renewable energy in the United Kingdom
- Wind power in the United Kingdom
