= Wind power in Scotland =

Renewable energy technology in Scotland

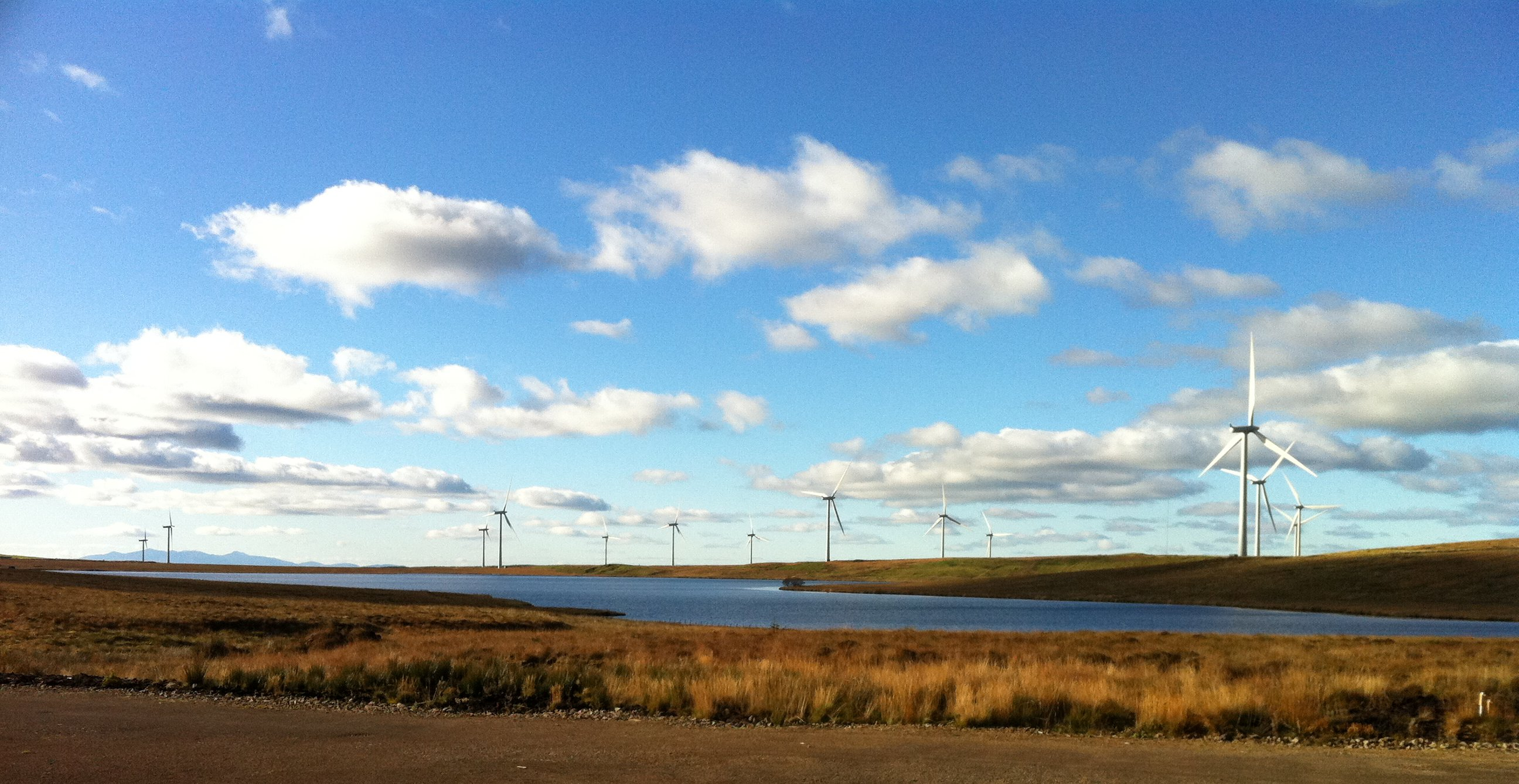
Whitelee Wind Farm with the Isle of Arran in the background.

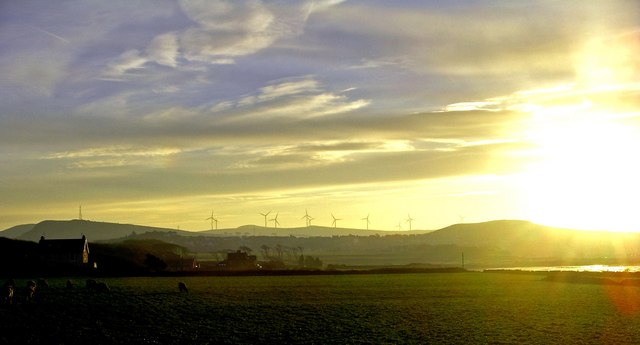
Ardrossan Wind Farm from Portencross, just after sunrise

Wind power is the fastest-growing renewable energy technology in Scotland, with 17.7 gigawatts (GW) of installed wind power capacity by Q2 2025. This included 10.4 GW from onshore wind in Scotland and 4.3 GW of offshore wind generators. The largest onshore wind farm in the UK is Whitelee, just south of Glasgow, with 215 turbines and a total capacity of 539 MW.

There is further potential for expansion, especially offshore given the high average wind speeds, and a number of large offshore wind farms are planned. As offshore wind farms are moving into deeper water, floating wind turbines are being used. Hywind Scotland off the coast of Peterhead was the world's first floating offshore wind farm, commissioned in October 2017.

== Targets ==
The Scottish Government has achieved its target of generating 50% of Scotland's electricity from renewable energy by 2015, and hoped to achieve 100% by 2020, which was raised from the lower target of 50% in September 2010. The majority of this was expected to come from wind power. Renewables produced the equivalent of 113% of Scotland's electricity consumption in 2022, mostly from wind.

The target for 2030, made in 2023, was for 11 GW of offshore wind by 2030. This would represent an increase of 400% in offshore wind and a 60% increase in total wind generated power and form part of the 50 GW of offshore wind planned by the UK by 2030. The EU North Seas Energy Cooperation group plans on having 76 GW in the North Sea by 2030.

In January 2026, the target for offshore wind in Scotland was increased to 40 GW by 2040. This was announced by the Cabinet Secretary for Climate Action and Energy, Gillian Martin at the Scottish Renewables Offshore Wind Conference in Glasgow.

== Historical installations ==
The wind turbine was invented by James Blyth and installed at his home in Marykirk in the Mearns, in 1887, leading to a second being installed at the Montrose Lunatic Asylum in 1895 at the Sunnyside Royal Hospital.

The first recorded public electricity system was installed on Wormit hill to supply the houses built by Alexander Stewart who built much of the village This initially consisted of a "windmill" on Wormit Hill and backup steam generator before replacement with a diesel generator in the 1930s.

== Contribution to the Scottish power grid ==
On Sunday 7 August 2016, a combination of high wind and low consumption caused more wind power generation (106%) than consumption in Scotland. Scottish wind turbines provided 39,545 MWh during the 24 hours of that date, while consumption was 37,202 MWh. It was the first time that measurements were available to confirm that fact. Renewables produced the equivalent of 97.4% of Scotland's electricity consumption in 2020, mostly from wind. In 2020, 3.6 TWh of Scottish wind power was curtailed.

In 2004, wind power produced nearly 850 GWh of electricity in Scotland, around 1.7% of all generation, and by 2010, this had increased to nearly 4.9 TWh (9.9%). In 2017, wind generated over a quarter (27%) of the electricity in Scotland. In 2020 it was 23.1 TWh (45%), although this dropped in 2021 to 19.9 TWh (42%). In 2022, wind generation in Scotland reached 28.8 TWh (55%). Over this period, the total annual electricity generation in Scotland has remained fairly constant, at around 50 TWh.

Graph showing total (TWh, blue crosses, left axis) and share (%, green dots, right axis) of wind power generation in Scotland from 2005 to 2022.

== Large wind farms ==
=== Black Law Wind Farm ===
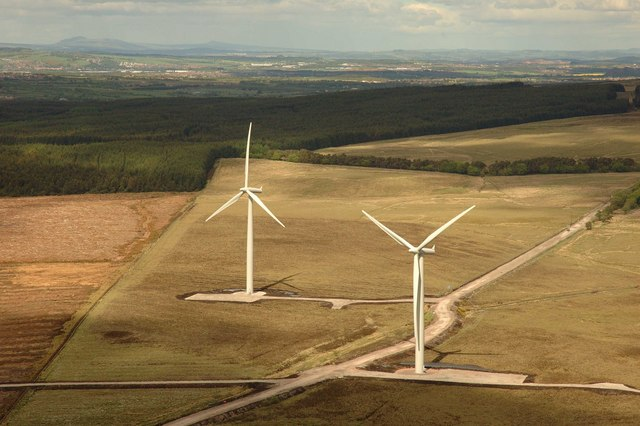
Two of the wind turbines at the Black Law Wind Farm

The 54-turbine Black Law Wind Farm has a total capacity of 124 MW. It is located near Forth in Lanarkshire and was built on old opencast coalmine site, with an original capacity of 97 MW from 42 turbines. It employs seven permanent staff on site and created 200 jobs during construction. A second phase saw the installation of a further 12 turbines. The project has received wide recognition for its contribution to environmental objectives. Over the period April 2009 to March 2010, Black Law Wind Farm produced 19.19% of its rated capacity.

=== Braes of Doune Wind Farm ===
The Braes of Doune Wind Farm opened in 2007 and is located close to Stirling. The wind farm has 36 Vestas 2 MW wind turbines. The farm was built and is run by Airtricity.

=== Clyde Wind Farm ===
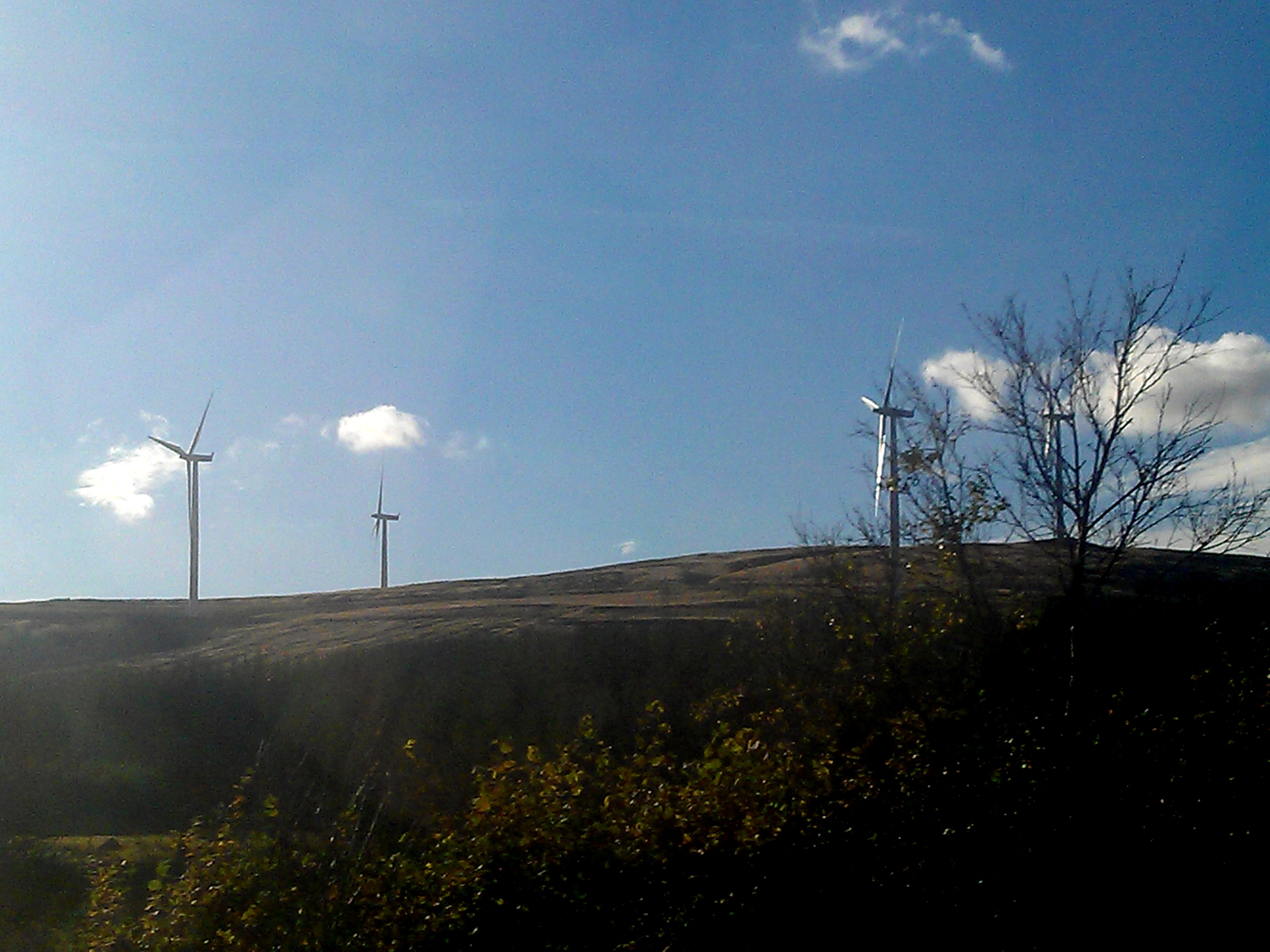
Clyde Wind Farm

The Clyde Wind Farm is a 522 MW wind farm near Abington in South Lanarkshire, Scotland. The 152-turbine project by Scottish and Southern Energy, which was approved by the Scottish Parliament in July 2008, is capable of powering 300,000 homes. Turbines have been built either side of the M74 motorway. Construction of the wind farm, which is budgeted for £600 million, started in early 2009 and finished in 2012. The farm was opened at a ceremonial ribbon cutting by First Minister of Scotland Alex Salmond in September 2012.

=== Crystal Rig Wind Farm ===
Crystal Rig Wind Farm is an operational onshore wind farm located on the Lammermuir Hills in the Scottish Borders region of Scotland. When it was completed in May 2004 it was the largest wind farm in Scotland. As a result of 3 extensions it is currently the 2nd largest wind farm in the UK, both in terms of nameplate capacity and number of turbines. The whole site has 85 turbines and a nameplate capacity of 200.5 MW.

=== Farr Wind Farm ===
Farr Wind Farm is located some 10 miles south of Inverness, and comprises 40 wind turbines with a total installed capacity of 92 MW. Every year the wind farm generates enough clean electricity to meet the average annual needs of some 54,000 homes.

=== Hadyard Hill Wind Farm ===
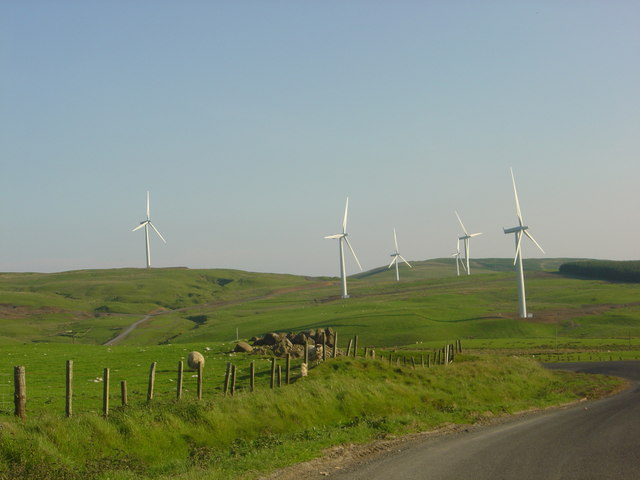
Hadyard Hill wind farm. Located on the B734 between Old Dailly and Barr.

Hadyard Hill Wind Farm, owned and operated by Scottish and Southern Energy (SSE), became the first wind farm in the UK with a capacity of over 100 MW. The 120 MW, 52-turbine wind farm in South Ayrshire cost £85 million and in a year generates enough electricity to power 80,000 homes, sufficient to supply every household in a city the size of York. The production of zero carbon electricity at the wind farm is expected to reduce emissions of carbon dioxide by almost 300,000 tonnes a year, equivalent to taking 70,000 cars off the road.

=== Novar Wind Farm ===
Novar Wind Farm is a 50 turbine, 53.8MW wind farm located in the Scottish Highlands. Constructed in 1997, Novar was of the earlier developments of Scottish on-shore wind generation. It provided a significant contribution to the local economy during construction and through its Community Benefit Fund. In 2010 an additional 16 turbines were constructed taking the yearly generation capacity to 53.8MW.

=== Viking Wind Farm ===
The Viking Wind Farm in the Shetland Islands was first proposed as a 600 MW 150 turbine project in 2009. After reduction in scope due to environmental concerns about effects of wildlife and peat bog carbon release during construction, as well as potential interference with equipment at Scatsta Airport the scheme was approved in 2012 as a 103 turbine scheme of 370 MW. The scheme is expected to achieve high capacity factors due to wind conditions in Shetland, as the Burradale has a capacity factor just over 50%. A high-voltage cable was laid to link Shetland to the UK electricity grid. The subsea cable and 103 turbine scheme capable of generating 443 MW was completed in August 2024.

=== Whitelee Wind Farm ===
Whitelee Wind Farm, near Eaglesham, East Renfrewshire is the largest on-shore wind farm in the United Kingdom with 215 Siemens and Alstom wind turbines and a total capacity of 539 MW.

There are many other large onshore wind farms in Scotland, at various stages of development, including some that are in community ownership.

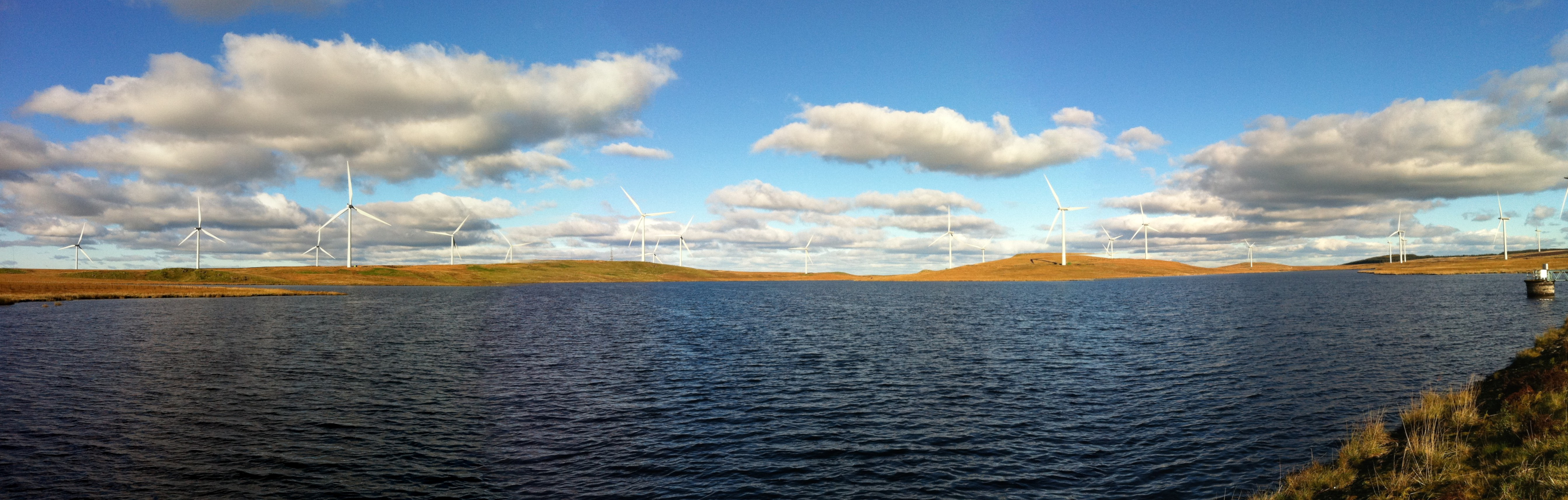
A panoramic view of the Whitelee wind farm with Lochgoin Reservoir in the foreground.

== Under construction or proposed ==
=== Whitelaw Brae Wind Farm ===
Whitelaw Brae windfarm is located approximately 3 miles south of Tweedsmuir in the Scottish Borders. It is planned to commence generation in winter 2026/27. The windfarm is funded using a co-operative model by Ripple Energy, allowing for small investments from individuals based on offsetting their own annual electricity consumption. According to project developers BayWa r.e. Whitelaw Brae Wind Farm will feature up to 14 turbines with an expected generating capacity of up to 57 MW, which is enough energy to supply approximately 43,000 homes.

=== Lethans Wind Farm ===
Lethans Wind Farm, east of New Cumnock was approved in 2020 as the tallest wind farm at 220m with 22 turbines with a capacity of 105MW.

== Offshore wind farms ==
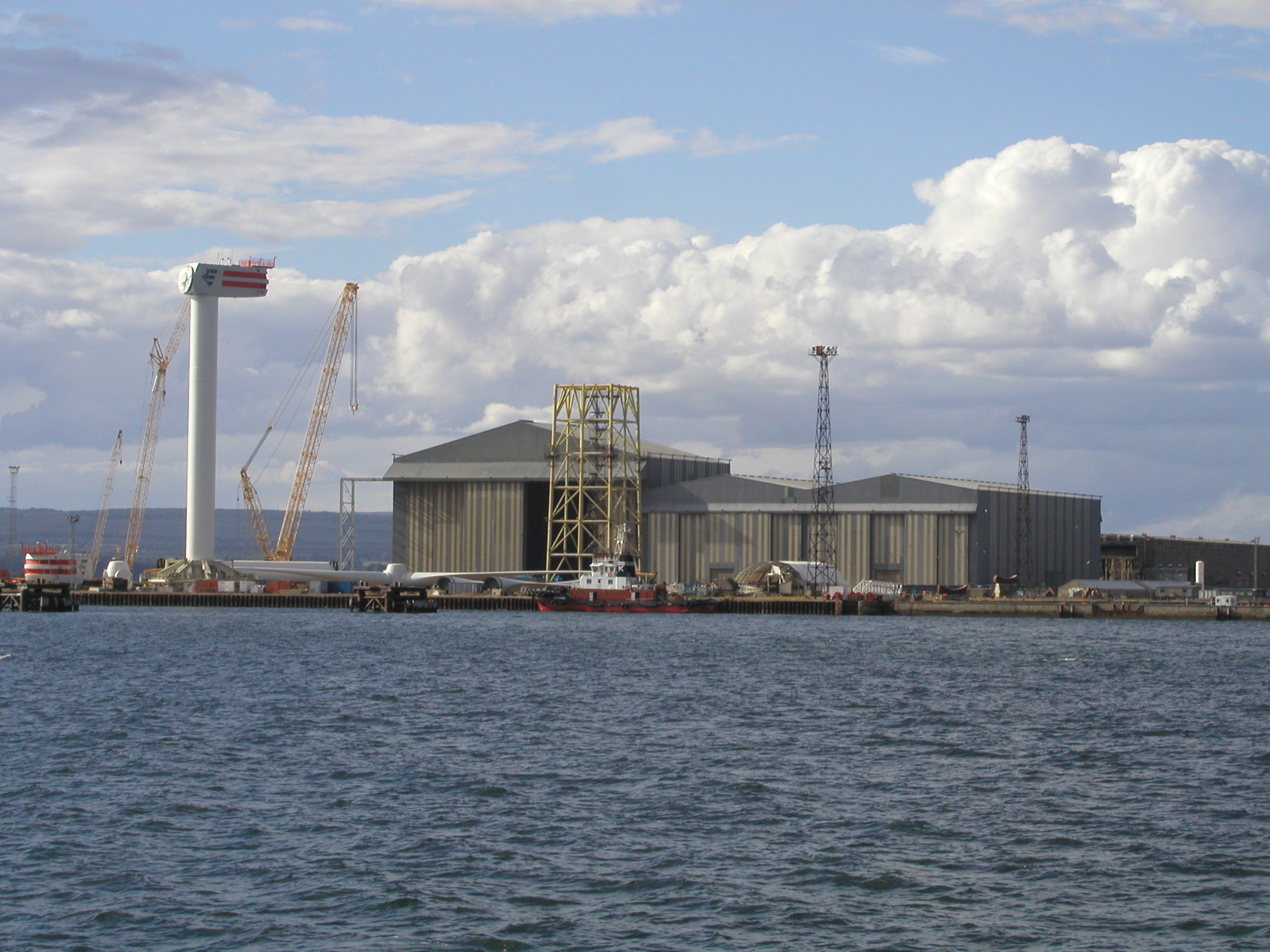
REpower 5 MW wind turbine under construction at Nigg fabrication yard on the Cromarty Firth

Scotland is the home to two offshore wind demonstration projects: The two turbine, 10 MW Beatrice Demonstrator Project located in the Moray Firth, and the single turbine, 7 MW Fife Energy Park Offshore Demonstration Wind Turbine in the Firth of Forth. There are also several other commercial-scale and demonstration projects in the planning stages.

Scotland has continued to develop its offshore wind industry, with a growing number of commercial-scale and demonstration projects planned or under development. These offshore wind farm projects in Scotland are located in areas including the Moray Firth and Firth of Forth, taking advantage of the country's extensive offshore wind resource and existing energy infrastructure.

Scotland's first offshore wind turbine was placed near the Beatrice Oil Field, 24 km (15 mi; 13 nmi) off the east coast in the Moray Firth, North Sea, in August 2006. This was the world's largest wind turbine at the time, an REpower 5M, with a maximum output of 5 MW. A second identical turbine joined it and the wind farm began supplying electricity in August 2007. As of February 2010, Beatrice Wind Farm is the deepest and northernmost offshore wind installation in the world.

This was the first time such large offshore wind turbines had been tested, and the first time any wind turbine generators have been assembled in such deep (44 metres) water. Such large wind turbine generators are ideally suited to the offshore environment due to high consistent wind speeds and minimal turbulence. According to historical measures of wind speeds at the Beatrice offshore location, it is expected that the turbines will run 96% of the time (8440 hours per year), and at 10 MW full power 38% of the time (3300 hours per year).

In January 2010 contracts were awarded for a major expansion of offshore wind power in the seas around Scotland. Moray Offshore Renewables will develop offshore wind power in the Moray Firth, and SeaGreen Wind Energy will develop offshore wind in the Firth of Forth. These developments could lead to 1,000 new wind turbines generating nearly 5,000 MW of power. Jobs "could also be created in manufacturing, research, engineering, installation, operation and services". In July 2016, RSPB challenged development in the Firth of Forth and Firth of Tay.

=== ScotWind leasing round ===
In January 2022, results of the ScotWind leasing round were announced by Crown Estate Scotland who manage the seabed off the coast of Scotland. Seventeen projects totalling around 25 GW were awarded option agreements, which could raise £700m in option fees. While noting offshore wind has a role to plan in addressing climate change, RSPB Scotland criticised the projects, claiming they could kill hundreds of seabird. In August 2022, a further 2.8 GW from three three floating wind projects to the east of Shetland were awarded in the clearing process. The Scottish Government faced some criticism it was undervaluing the seabed, initially setting the option agreements at up to £10k per km^{2} although this was revised to £100k per km^{2} before the auction. Crown Estate Scotland expects that the rent paid by projects that get built, at £1.07 per MWh produced would be more than the £756m in option fees.

=== INTOG leasing round ===
In 2022, Crown Estate Scotland announced a further leasing round for Innovation and Targeted Oil & Gas (INTOG) projects. Rather than just supplying electricity to the National Grid, these were to help decarbonise North Sea hydrocarbon production. This offered two "pots", firstly for small (less than 100 MW) innovative deep water wind arrays, the "IN" part of INTOG. Secondly, larger Targeted Oil & Gas (TOG) farms supplying power to existing offshore infrastructure.

Thirteen projects were offered exclusivity agreements in March 2023. All five small scale innovation (IN) projects with a total capacity of 449 MW signed these by May 2023. In November, seven of the eight TOG projects signed the exclusivity agreements. These projects can now progress with the planning and design stages.

List of INTOG offshore wind projects under development
Project name	Potential power (MW)	Lead developer	IN/TOG	Location
Aspen	1,008	Cerulean Winds	TOG	
Beech	1,008	Cerulean Winds	TOG	
Cedar	1,008	Cerulean Winds	TOG	
Cenos	1,350	Flotation Energy	TOG	
Culzean	3	TotalEnergies	TOG	
Flora	50	BP Alternative Energy Investments	IN	East of Peterhead
Green Volt	560	Flotation Energy	TOG	
Judy	15	Harbour Energy	TOG	
Malin Sea Wind	100	ESB Group	IN	Between Islay and Portrush.
Salamander	100	Simply Blue Energy	IN	East of Fraserburgh
Scaraben	99.45	BlueFloat Energy/Renantis partnership	IN	47 km (29 mi) north of Fraserburgh.
Sinclair	99.45	BlueFloat Energy/Renantis partnership	IN	47 km (29 mi) north of Fraserburgh.

=== List of offshore wind farms ===
The complete list of sites including power updates and developer name changes:

Wind farms in Scottish waters
	Site Name	Potential power (MW)	Developer	Notes
	Robin Rigg Wind Farm	180	Statoil	Sited at Robin Rigg, a sandbank midway between the Galloway and Cumbrian coasts in the Solway Firth. 60 Vestas V90-3MW wind turbines
	Beatrice	588	SSE Renewables plc and Talisman Energy	SSE owns 40%, Copenhagen Infrastructure Partners (CIP) (35%) and SDIC Power (25%). Application approved by Marine Scotland in March 2014, Construction to begin early 2017. Fully operational in June 2019
	Inch Cape	(1000)	Repsol Nuevas Energias SA; EDP Renewables	Repsol owns 51%, EDPR owns 49%. Application approved by Marine Scotland in October 2014. 72 V236-15.0 MW turbines.
	Hywind Scotland	30	Statoil	floating wind farm 15 miles (24 km) off Peterhead Constructed between July and September 2017, power generation started in October 2017. As of 2021, it has averaged a capacity factor in excess of 50%.
	Seagreen Offshore Wind Farm	1,075	SSE Renewables	114 Vestas V164-10.0 MW turbines 27 km off the Angus coast in the North Sea’s Firth of Forth; Operational from October 2023
	Neart Na Gaoithe	(450)	Mainstream Renewable Power Ltd	Application approved by Marine Scotland in October 2014. Scheduled for 2024
	Moray East	950	Ocean Winds, KEPCO, Mitsubishi Corporation	Operational as of 2021
	Moray West	(882)		Scheduled for 2025
	Islay		SSE Renewables	No further investment from SSE into the project for the foreseeable future.
	Solway Firth		E.ON Climate & Renewables UK Developments	Dormant – Unsuitable for development
	Wigtown Bay		DONG Wind (UK)	Dormant – Unsuitable for development
	Kintyre		Airtricity Holdings (UK) Ltd	Cancelled due to proximity to local communities and Campbeltown Airport
	Forth Array		Fred. Olsen Renewables Ltd	Cancelled. Fred. Olsen pulled out to concentrate on its onshore developments
	Bell Rock		Airtricity Holdings (UK) Ltd; Fluor Ltd	Cancelled due to radar services in the area.
	Argyll Array		ScottishPower Renewables	Cancelled due to ground conditions and presence of basking sharks
Total		2,200		

== Community ownership of wind farms ==
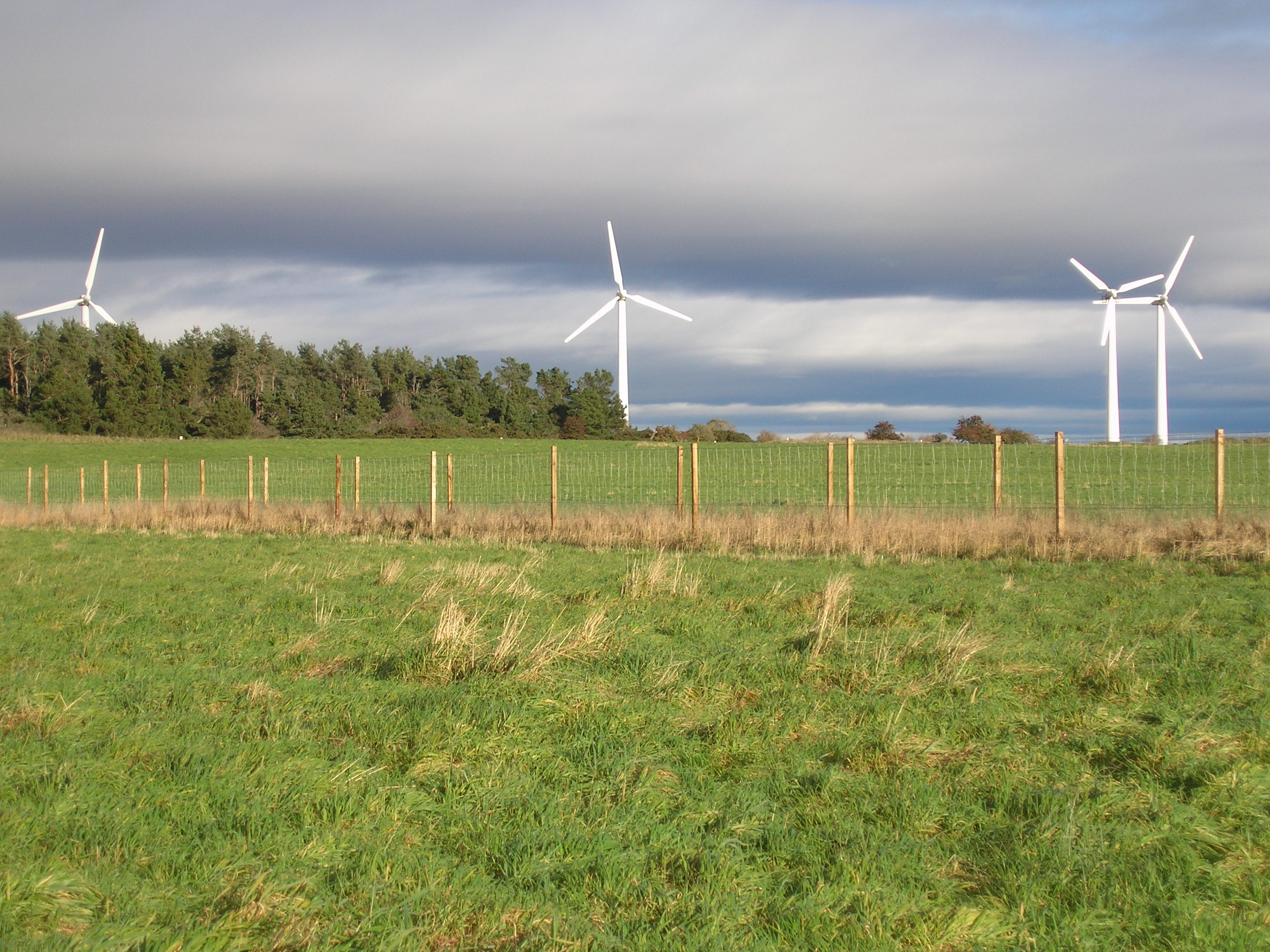
The wind turbines at Findhorn, which make the Ecovillage a net exporter of electricity.

Community-owned schemes in Scotland include one on the Isle of Gigha. The Heritage Trust set up Gigha Renewable Energy to buy and operate three Vestas V27 wind turbines, known locally as The Dancing Ladies or Creideas, Dòchas is Carthannas (Gaelic for Faith, Hope and Charity). They were commissioned on 21 January 2005 and are capable of generating up to 675 kW of power. Revenue is produced by selling the electricity to the grid via an intermediary called Green Energy UK. Gigha residents control the whole project and profits are reinvested in the community.

Findhorn Ecovillage has four Vestas wind turbines which can generate up to 750 kW. These make the community net exporters of renewably generated electricity. Most of the generation is used on-site with any surplus exported to the National Grid.

Boyndie Wind Farm Co-operative is part of the Energy4All group, which promotes community ownership. A number of other schemes supported by Community Energy Scotland are in the pipeline.

== Debate ==
The siting of turbines is often an issue, but multiple surveys have shown high local community acceptance for wind power in Scotland. Existing public policy with regard to wind power has become a topic of debate in recent years.

=== Public opinion surveys ===
Which should be increased in Scotland?

In 2003, MORI Scotland was commissioned by the Scottish Executive to undertake a study examining the attitudes of people living close to Scottish wind farms. The survey showed that people living near Scotland's ten largest wind farms strongly support more of Scotland's energy needs being produced by the wind. 82% wanted an increase in electricity generated from wind power, whilst more than 50% supported an increase in the number of wind turbines at their local wind farm. 20% say their local wind farm has had a broadly positive impact on the area, as opposed to a negative impact (7%).

A survey conducted in 2005, and commissioned by the renewable energy industry, showed that 74% of people in Scotland agree that wind farms are necessary to meet current and future energy needs. When people were asked the same question in a Scottish Renewables study conducted in 2010, 78% agreed. The increase is significant as there were twice as many wind farms in 2010 as there were in 2005. The 2010 survey also showed that 52% disagreed with the statement that wind farms are "ugly and a blot on the landscape". 59% agreed that wind farms were necessary and that how they looked was unimportant. The 2010 study suggests that the majority of people in Scotland are in support of sustainable energy. However this survey has been widely criticised for its methodology, in that it used a weighting scale such that the opinion those who lived nearer windfarms was rated as of lesser importance.

In 2013, a YouGov energy survey concluded that:

New YouGov research for Scottish Renewables shows Scots are twice as likely to favour wind power over nuclear or shale gas Over six in ten (62%) people in Scotland say they would support large scale wind projects in their local area, more than double the number who said they would be generally for shale gas (24%) and almost twice as much as nuclear (32%). Hydro power is the most popular energy source for large scale projects in Scotland, with an overwhelming majority (80%) being in favour.

In 2022, an official survey found that 80% of Scots approve of offshore wind farms.

=== Aesthetics and environmental issues ===
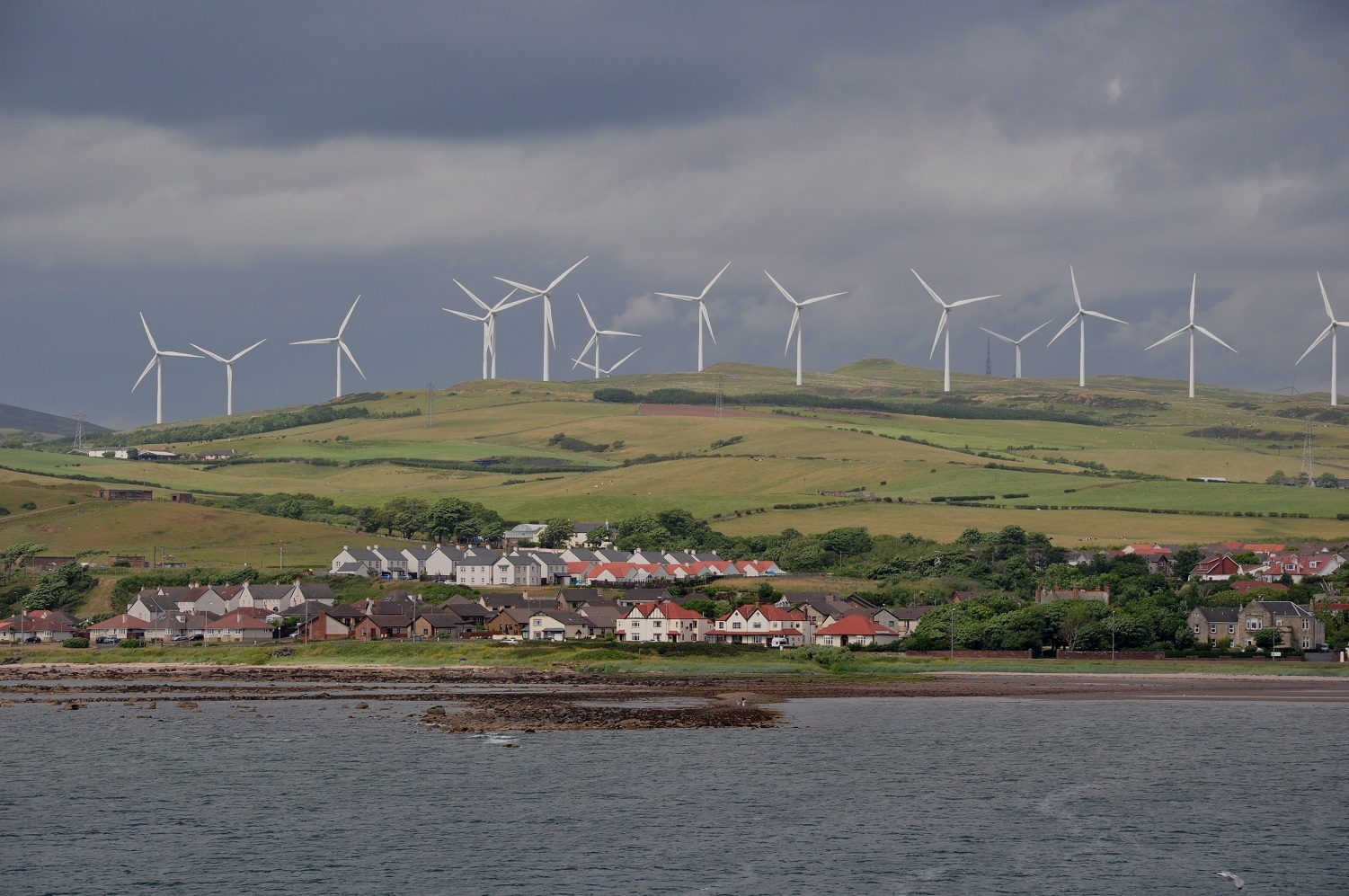
The Ardrossan Wind Farm

Siting of wind turbines has sometimes been an issue, as most people are concerned about the value of natural landscapes. The John Muir Trust has stated that "the best renewable energy options around wild land are small-scale, sensitively sited and adjacent to the communities directly benefiting from them". A small-scale scheme proposed by North Harris development trust has been supported by the John Muir Trust. A 2013 poll carried out by the John Muir Trust, suggests that 75% of Scots would like to see their wild areas protected from further development. Wind farm developers sometimes offer "community benefit funds" to help address any disadvantages faced by those living adjacent to wind farms.

The Ardrossan Wind Farm on the west coast of Scotland has been "overwhelmingly accepted by local people". Instead of spoiling the landscape, local people believe it has enhanced the area. According to one of the town's councillors: "The turbines are impressive looking, bring a calming effect to the town and, contrary to the belief that they would be noisy, we have found them to be silent workhorses".

The £90 million Black Law Wind Farm is located near Forth in Lanarkshire and has been built on an old opencast coalmine site which was completely restored to shallow wetlands during the construction programme. It employs seven permanent staff on site and created 200 jobs during construction.

However, concerns over inappropriate siting of turbines has been voiced by groups in Fife, in particular, where the number of planning applications for turbines has risen sharply. This also is true of Berwickshire, which is home to the second largest windfarm in the UK, Crystal Rig Wind Farm, and where hundreds more turbines are due to be situated, contrary to the wishes of many residents of the county, and the John Muir Trust.

Also, the siting of turbines in environmentally sensitive areas has led to the deaths of migratory and native birds, such as on Harris where a rare visitor to Scotland, a white-throated needletail was witnessed being killed by a turbine.

Inevitably carbon emissions are produced during construction and transport. Manufacturers typically state that carbon emissions are 'paid back' within 3–18 months of production, but recent research claims that turbines located on peat bogs create incidental emissions that may increase this to 8 years or more. A 2013 financial analysis of utility companies such as the SSE (formerly Scottish and Southern Electricity) concluded that utilities were haemorrhaging cash. Construction of wind farms by the electrical generating industry lead to duplication of existing power plants which were still needed as backup without increasing the utilities customer base or their output.

Scottish Natural Heritage has stated that the decommissioning of ageing turbine structures in the future would be more deleterious to the environment than leaving the bases in place, thus littering Scotland's wild land with concrete which though they could be covered with topsoil, could lead to "oxidising and subsequent staining/contamination" and would lead to irreversible damage to the sensitive peatlands on which many are built. Alternatively, new wind farms could be built on the same site, minimising overall damage.

=== Tourism impacts ===
Some Scottish wind farms have become tourist attractions. According to a 2002 poll carried out by MORI Scotland, "nine out of ten tourists visiting some of Scotland's top beauty spots say the presence of wind farms makes no difference to the enjoyment of their holiday, and twice as many people would return to an area because of the presence of a wind farm than would stay away". The Whitelee Wind Farm Visitor Centre has an exhibition room, a learning hub, a café with a viewing deck and also a shop. It is run by the Glasgow Science Centre.

Economic impact studies have also been undertaken that looked at the impact of the development of onshore wind on the local tourism sector. This found that wind farms did not harm the employment in the tourism sector in the areas surrounding wind farm and in fact, in the majority of the case studies the tourism sector in the immediate local area performed better than in the wider local authority.

A 2016 study found no connection between tourism and wind power.

== Wind variability ==
Most turbines in the European Union produce electricity at an average of 25% of their rated maximum power due to the variability of wind resources, but Scotland's wind regime provides average capacity factor of 31% or higher on the west and northern coasts. The load factor recorded for the onshore North Rhins windfarm near Stranraer was 40%, which is typical for well-sited mainland windfarms. A small wind farm in Shetland with five Vestas V47 660 kW turbines recently achieved a world record of 58% capacity over the course of a year. This record is claimed by Burradale windfarm, located just outside Lerwick and operated by Shetland Aerogenerators Ltd. Since opening in 2000, the turbines at this wind farm have had an average capacity factor of 52% and, according to this report, in 2005 averaged a world record 57.9%. However, a Scottish opposition group found 124 separate occasions from 2008 to 2010 when the nation's wind output fell to less than 2% of installed capacity. On the west and northern coasts Scotland's wind regime can provide an average of 40% or higher.

== Potential ==
It is estimated that 11.5 GW of onshore wind potential exists, enough to provide about 45 TWh of energy in a year, allowing for wind variability. More than double this amount exists on offshore sites where mean wind speeds are greater than on land. The total offshore potential is estimated at 25 GW, and although more expensive to install could be enough to provide almost half the total energy used in Scotland.

According to a recent report, the world's wind market offers many opportunities for Scottish companies, with total global revenue over the next five years estimated at £35 billion and continued growth forecast until at least 2025.

== See also ==
- Dieter Helm
- Energy policy of the United Kingdom
- Energy use and conservation in the United Kingdom
- List of power stations in Scotland
- Renewable Energy Foundation
- Renewable energy in Scotland
- Renewable energy in the European Union
- RenewableUK
- Struan Stevenson
- Wind power in the United Kingdom
