= Arecleoch Wind Farm =

Wind farm in South Ayrshire, Scotland

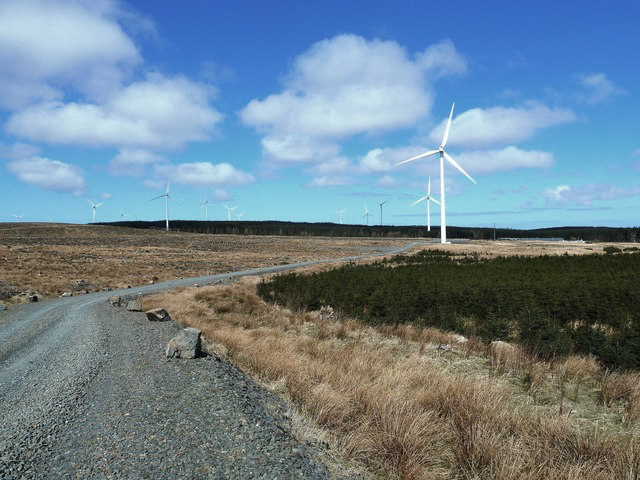
- Arecleoch Wind Farm
- Country: Scotland, United Kingdom
- Location: South Ayrshire
- Coordinates: 55°03′12″N 04°52′56″W
- Status: Operational
- Construction began: 2009
- Commission date: June 2011
- Owner: ScottishPower Renewables
- Operator: ScottishPower

Wind farm
- Type: Onshore

Power generation
- Units operational: 60 X 2 MW
- Make and model: Gamesa: G80
- Nameplate capacity: 120 MW

Arecleoch Wind Farm is a 60 turbine wind farm in South Ayrshire, Scotland with a total capacity of 120 megawatts (MW), enough to power over 67,000 homes. Construction started in 2009 and it was commissioned in June 2011.

A 72.8MW extension was approved in 2021, despite objections from South Ayrshire Council.

== Incidents ==
In January and February 2016 there were two separate incidents of a turbine catching fire overnight while the site was unmanned due to faults in the HV transformer, there was two further turbine fires over the next 12months. On one occasion there were two technicians climbing the tower as the fire took hold, they escaped without injury. The turbines were destroyed and were disassembled and removed from site. Scottish Power reported to the Sunday Mail on 10 April 2016 they were investigating these incidents along with the manufacturer Gamesa.

== See also ==
- Wind power in Scotland
- List of onshore wind farms
