= RenewableUK =

Trade association in the United Kingdom

RenewableUK, formerly known as the British Wind Energy Association (BWEA), is the trade association for wind power, wave power and tidal power industries in the United Kingdom.

== History ==
A number of universities active in wind energy in the 1970s met under umbrella of the ITDG Wind Panel (Intermediate Technology Development Group). The BWEA was formed from the ITDG Wind Panel along with other interested parties and representatives from industry, to promote wind power in the United Kingdom. The inaugural meeting of the BWEA took place on 17 November 1978 at the Rutherford Laboratory with Peter Musgrove of Reading University as chairman.

In 2004 the British Wind Energy Association expanded its remit to include wave and tidal energy, and to use the Association's experience to guide these technologies along the same path to commercialisation. In December 2009, to reflect this expansion in the industries it represented, members resolved to adopt the new name of RenewableUK.

=== RenewableUK Cymru ===
The members of RenewableUK are represented in Wales by RenewableUK Cymru, the Cardiff-based branch of the organisation. The remit in Wales expanded in February 2014 to include all renewable energy technologies and energy storage.

== Criticisms ==
=== Advertising Standards Authority ruling ===
In 2008 the then BWEA was found by the Advertising Standards Authority (ASA) to have overstated the carbon dioxide emissions displaced by wind generation. The BWEA and its members had claimed a value of 860 grams per kilowatt hour but the ASA found this was exaggerated by 100% and ordered the BWEA to reduce the figure to 430 grams.

== See also ==
- Renewable energy in the United Kingdom
- Energy use and conservation in the United Kingdom
- Wind power in Scotland
- European Wind Energy Association
