= Ardrossan Wind Farm =

Wind farm in Scotland

Coordinates: 55°41′N 4°48′W

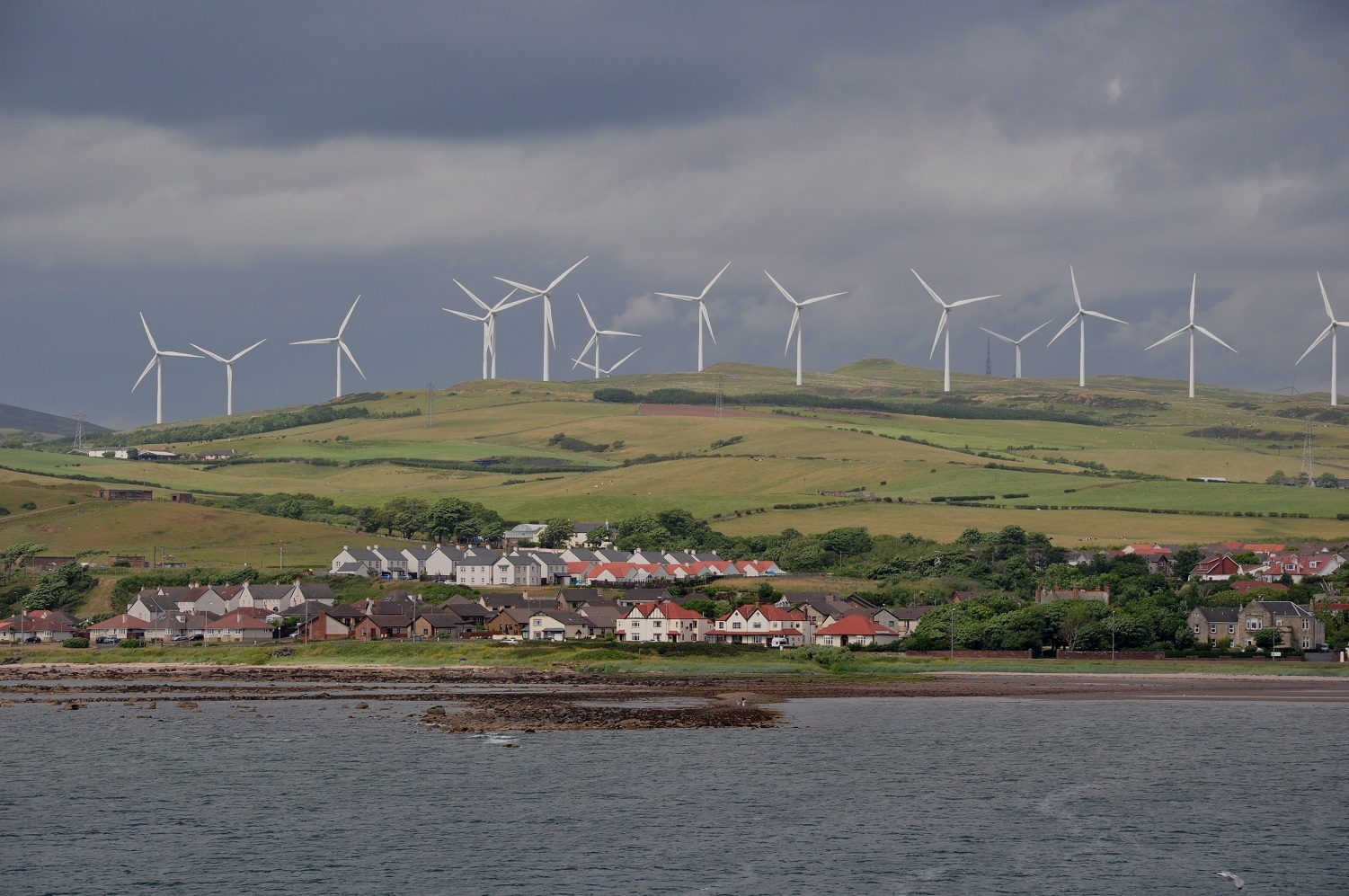
Ardrossan Wind Farm, behind the town

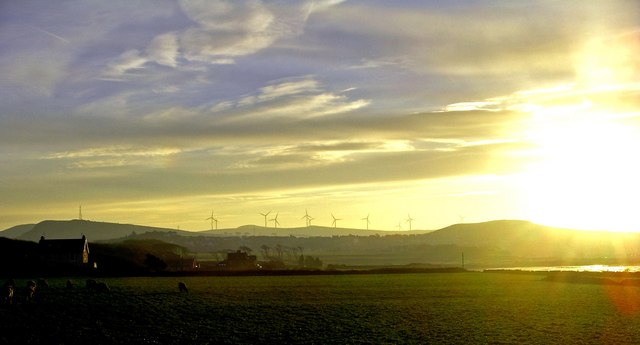
Ardrossan Wind Farm from Portencross, just after sunrise

The 24 megawatt (MW) Ardrossan Wind Farm in Ardrossan, North Ayrshire, Scotland was officially opened on 10 August 2004. The Vestas factory in Argyll, which now employs more than 200 people, has supplied the wind turbines for the Airtricity development. The company is providing access to the site for schools and other interested community groups to learn more about wind power.

The Guardian has reported that the Ardrossan Wind Farm has been "overwhelmingly accepted by local people". A local councillor wrote that "The turbines are impressive looking, bring a calming effect to the town and, contrary to the belief that they would be noisy, we have found them to be silent workhorses".

In the Hurricane Bawbag storms of December 2011, one of the turbines of the wind farm catastrophically failed in a ball of fire.

== See also ==
- List of onshore wind farms in the United Kingdom
- Wind power in Scotland
