= RenewableUK Cymru =

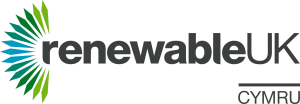
- Abbreviation: RUK Cymru
- Formation: 2006
- Legal status: Not for profit company
- Purpose: The trade body for renewable energy and smart energy.
- Location: Cardiff
- Region served: Wales
- Members: Commercial organisations, not for profit companies or charities
- Leader: Rhys Jones
- Parent organization: RenewableUK
- Website: RenewableUK Cymru website

RenewableUK Cymru is the Wales branch of RenewableUK, and is the trade body for all renewable energy, and smart energy and storage technologies in Wales.

== History ==
RenewableUK Cymru's activities commenced in 2006 with the appointment of a full time Wales officer, Llywelyn Rhys. At that time RenewableUK was known as the British Wind Energy Association. In 2012, David Clubb took over as Director.

== See also ==
- Ynni Cymru
