= Beinn an Tuirc windfarm =

Wind farm in Argyll, Scotland

Beinn an Tuirc Wind Farm
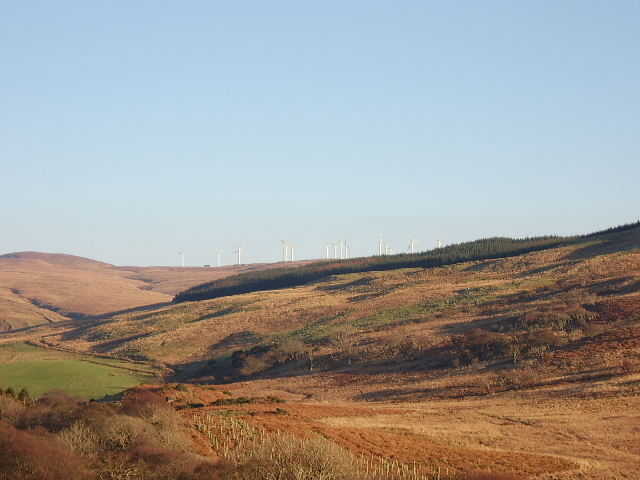
- Beinn an Tuirc Wind Farm, Kintyre.
- Country: Scotland, United Kingdom
- Location: near Campbeltown, Argyll & Bute
- Coordinates: 55°34′17″N 05°34′34″W
- Status: Operational
- Commission date: December 2001
- Owner: ScottishPower

Wind farm
- Type: Onshore

Power generation
- Units operational: 46
- Nameplate capacity: 30 MW

External links
- Commons: Related media on Commons

Beinn an Tuirc wind farm is a wind farm in Argyll, Scotland.

The site has 46 turbines with a total generating capacity of 30.36 MW, with each unit being a Vestas V47-660, with each turbine producing 660 kW, and is operated by ScottishPower. It was commissioned in 2001 and started operation in 2002. It cost £21 million to build. The turbines were built by Danish company Vestas, which specializes in their manufacture. It is 10 miles (16 kilometres) north of Campbeltown on the slopes of the Beinn an Tuirc, the highest hill on the Kintyre peninsula.

ScottishPower was awarded a Queen's Award for Enterprise in 2006 for constructing Beinn an Tuirc and Black Law wind farms with a "collaborative and responsible approach". This referred to the company's practice of taking into account environmental concerns and the wishes of the local community in the wind farms' construction.

One of the V47 turbines suffered a catastrophic failure in November 2007 when a brake problem led to the tower being bent in two. This was the first incident of an operational turbine tower collapsing in the UK. The farm was closed as a precaution, but soon reopened.

In an unusual move, ScottishPower has offered local rangers £30 for every mountain hare they hand over. The idea is to re-introduce this species to an area near to the wind farm in an attempt to lure golden eagles away from the turbines. The Royal Society for the Protection of Birds said, "ScottishPower's approach in creating this habitat that takes into account local biodiversity is to be welcomed."
