= Braes of Doune Wind Farm =

Wind farm in Scotland

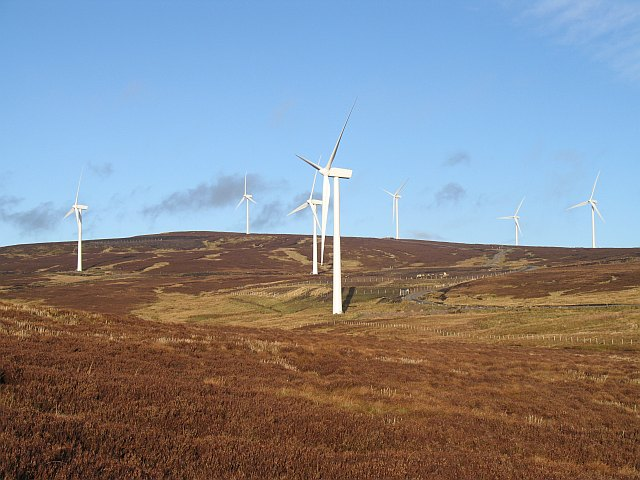
- Country: United Kingdom, Scotland
- Location: near Stirling
- Coordinates: 56°16′34″N 04°03′45″W
- Status: Operational
- Commission date: February 2007
- Owner: Greencoat UK Wind
- Operator: Airtricity

Power generation
- Units operational: 36
- Make and model: Vestas: V80 2.0
- Nameplate capacity: 72 MW

External links
- Commons: Related media on Commons

Braes of Doune Wind Farm is a wind farm located close to Stirling, Scotland and opened in 2007.

== History ==
The farm was built by Alfred McAlpine in 2007 and handed over to Airtricity to operate. An agreement was reached with Centrica, the owners of Scottish Gas, to purchase energy output from the farm.

In 2015, the wind farm was purchased by Greencoat UK Wind and by a fund managed by Hermes GPE LLP after Greencoat UK Wind acquired its 50 per cent interest from SSE, and in 2021 it became wholly owned by Greencoat UK Wind.

== Turbines ==
The farm has 36 Vestas V80 2.0 megawatt wind turbines with a total capacity of 72MW.

== See also ==
- Wind power in Scotland
