= Renantis =

Italian renewable energy company

Nadara
- Formerly: Falck Renewables Renantis S.p.A. Ventient Energy
- Type: Limited company
- Industry: Renewable energy
- Predecessor: Actelios
- Founded: 2002
- Headquarters: Milan, Italy
- Products: Electric power
- Number of employees: 991 (2024)

Renantis S.p.A. is a renewable energy company based in Milan, Italy. It has an installed capacity of 1,420 MW in Italy, UK, France, Spain, the US, Norway and Sweden. Its activities include the development, financing, construction and operational management of renewable energy plants. Through the expertise of its subsidiary Vector Renewables, Renantis also offers services along the entire value chain.

== History ==
In 2002, Falck Renewables was established, with its first renewable energy project – a 14 MW waste-to-energy plant in Calabria, Italy.

In 2014, through the acquisition of Vector Cuatro (later renamed into Vector Renewables), the company entered the market of asset management and technical advisory services for photovoltaic and wind power plants.

In 2022, the company was bought by institutional investors and changed its name to Renantis.

In June 2023, Renantis announced that it would combine with Ventient Energy to become one of the largest renewable power producers in Europe, with a total installed capacity of 4.2 GW and an 18 GW pipeline. Following the announcement, in July 2024, Renantis and Ventient Energy came together to form Nadara.

In March 2026, Nadara announced its acquisition of Talveg Wind (a French company specialized in operation and maintenance services for wind assets) to internalize maintenance services and further develop their independence in the renewable market.

== Corporate affairs ==
The chairman of the company is Olov Mikael Kramer and managing director is Toni Volpe.

In 2024, the company had revenues of €785,52 million.
