= Dun Law =

Hill in South Lanarkshire, Scotland

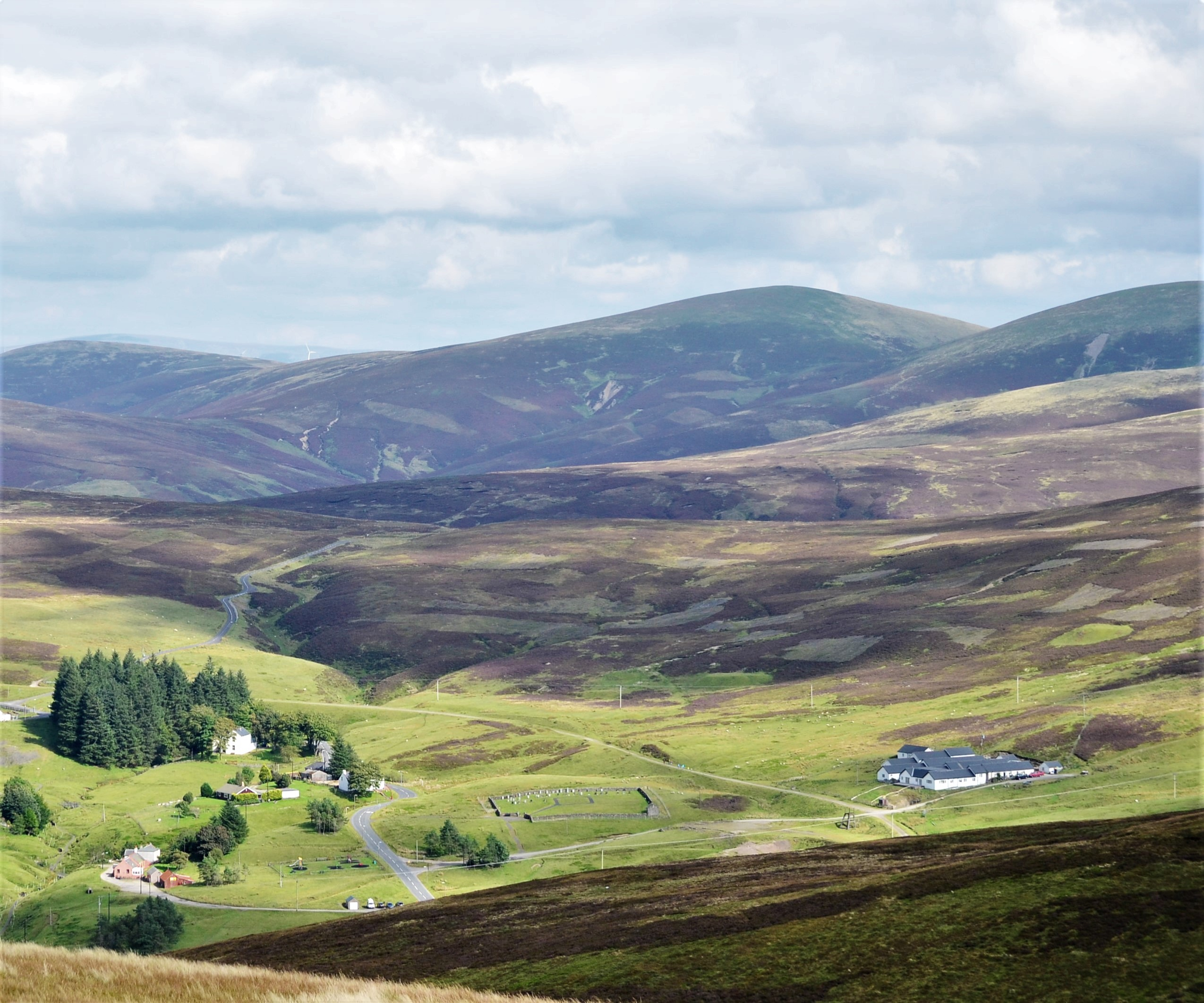

Highest point
- Elevation: 677 m (2,221 ft)
- Prominence: 105 m (344 ft)
- Listing: Hu,Tu,Sim,D,GT,DN,Y

Naming
- English translation: Scottish Gaelic, Scots: Fort Hill

Geography
- Location: South Lanarkshire, Scotland
- Parent range: Lowther Hills, Southern Uplands
- OS grid: NS 91669 13651
- Topo map: OS Landranger 71, 78

Dun Law is a hill in the Lowther Hills range, part of the Southern Uplands of Scotland. It is the next Donald after Green Lowther, the highest point of the ridge, when walking northeast and is usually ascended from this direction.

== Images ==
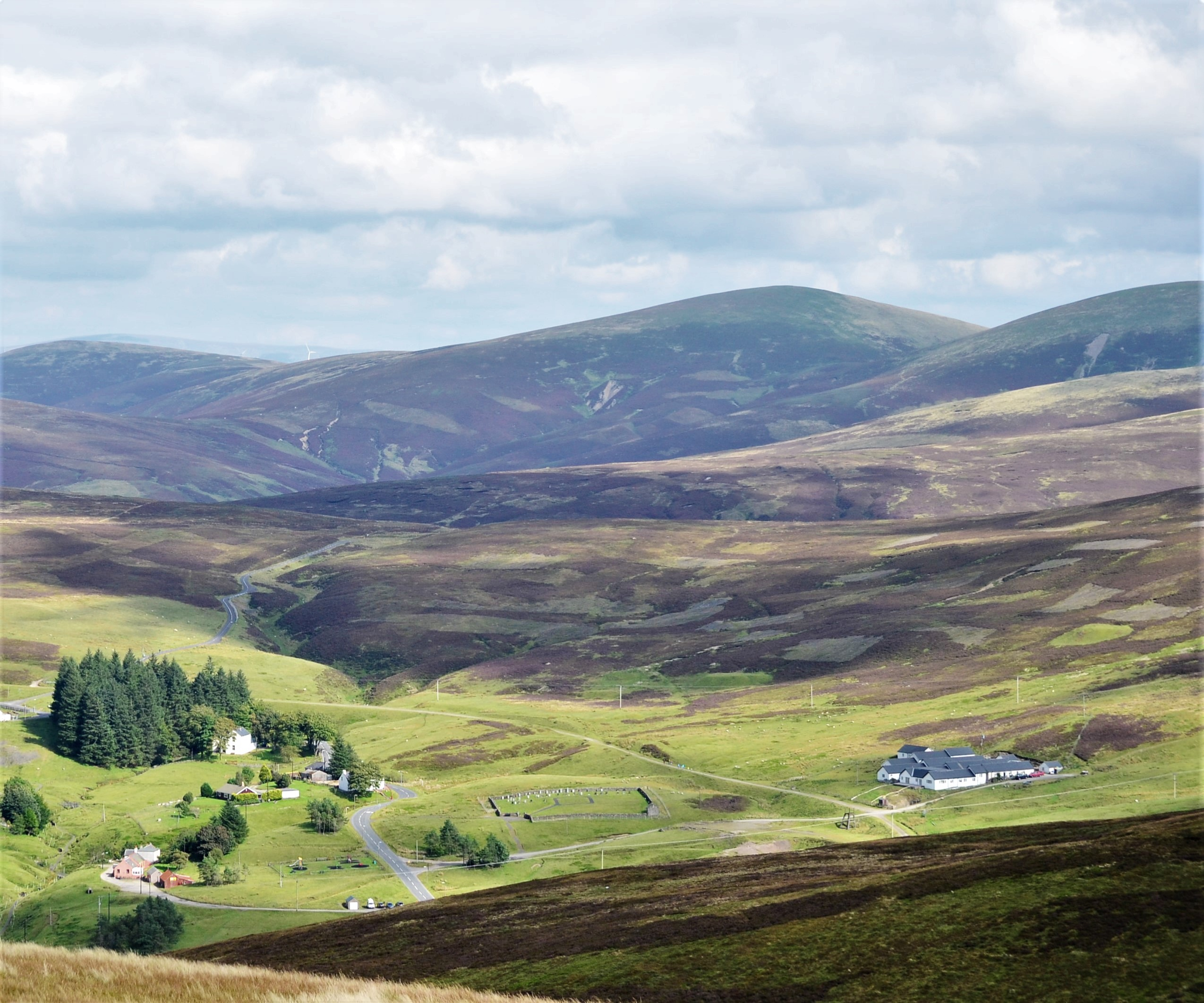

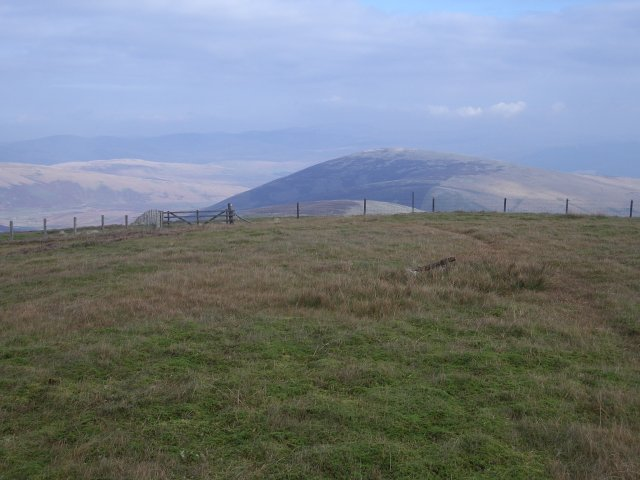

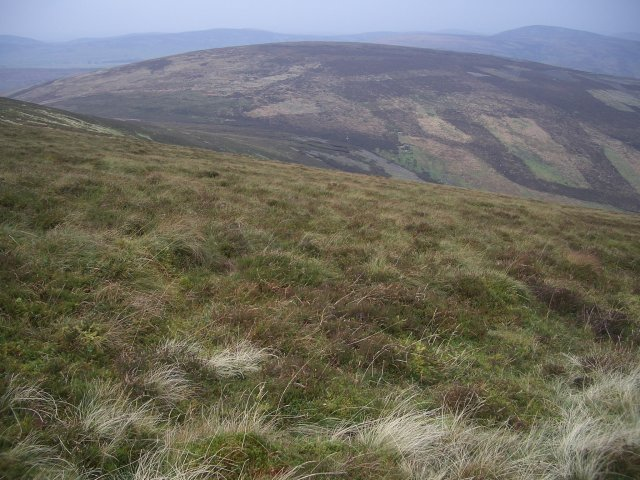
