= Moel Maelogan =

Hill in north Wales

Moel Maelogen
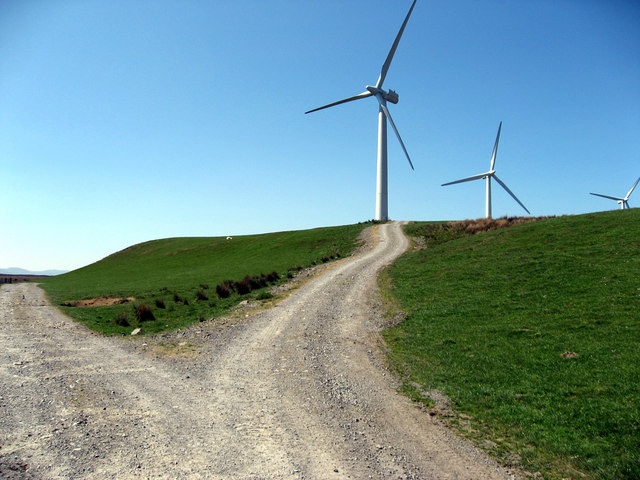
- The first 3 turbines at Moel Maelogan
- Country: Wales, United Kingdom
- Coordinates: 53°08′08″N 03°43′00″W
- Status: Operational
- Commission date: January 2003
- Owner: Co WP Mombkg UK branch
- Operator: GT O+M

Power generation
- Units operational: 12 x 1.3 MW
- Make and model: Bonus 1300/62, Siemens Wind Power SWT-1.3-62
- Nameplate capacity: 41.6 MW

Moel Maelogan (shown on O.S. maps as 'Maelogen', and also sometimes spelled 'Moelogan' and 'Mælogan') is a hill (summit height 424m) on the western edge of Mynydd Hiraethog (also known as the Denbigh Moors) in north Wales, and overlooking the Conwy Valley. It is known mostly as the general location of a wind farm.

The initial three turbines were erected in 2002, and started generating in January 2003; each turbine is capable of producing 1300 kW. This scheme marked erection of the UK wind industry's 1000th turbine and was initially welcomed, as it had been set up by three local farmers to boost their incomes, under the name of Cwmni Gwynt Teg ("Fair Wind Company"). After commissioning, however, it was opposed by some, not least because, although not located in the Snowdonia National Park itself, the turbines are visible from many parts of it.

Of the three turbines, two were owned and operated by the local farming co-operative; the third was owned and operated by Energiekontor UK Ltd, the UK subsidiary of the German wind development company Energiekontor AG, which was instrumental in the finance and construction of the wind farm.

The electricity produced goes to the local Llanrwst sub-station 4.5 km away, and is sold to the Non-Fossil Purchasing Agency.

Under the project name of "Ail Wynt" (Second Wind), Cwmni Gwynt Teg planned a further 11 turbines but this was rejected. Despite further opposition an amended plan for an additional 9 turbines was passed, and these were built and commissioned in 2008 "within a more compact area and at reduced height".

Cwmni Gwynt Teg won an Ashden Award in 2003 for its work on the wind farm.

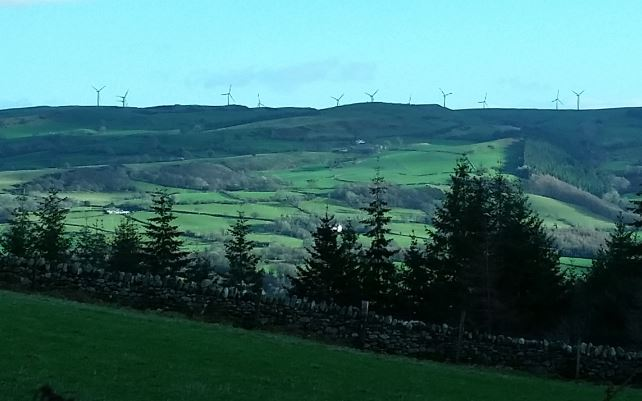
The 12 wind turbines on Moel Maelogan, as seen from Llanrhychwyn

== See also ==
- Wind power in the United Kingdom
- Renewable energy
