= Carno wind farm =

Wind farm in Wales

Carno Wind Farm
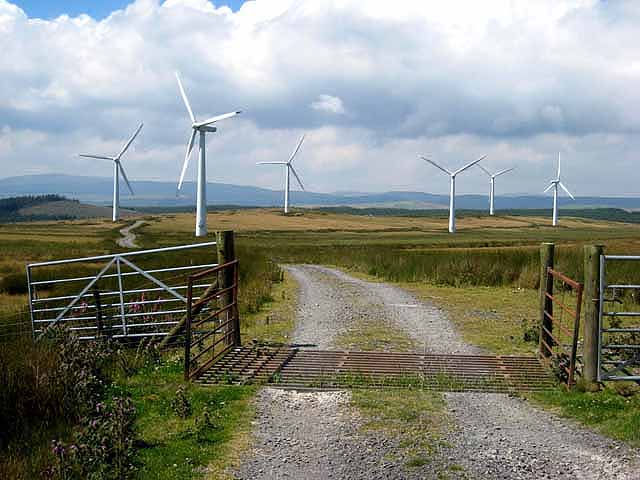
- Carno wind farm July 2008
- Country: Wales, United Kingdom
- Location: near Carno, Powys
- Coordinates: 52°33′01″N 03°36′01″W
- Status: Operational
- Commission date: October 1996; March 2009
- Owner: npower

Wind farm
- Hub height: 49 m (161 ft)
- Rotor diameter: 62 m (203 ft)

Power generation
- Units operational: 68
- Make and model: Siemens Gamesa
- Nameplate capacity: 49.2 MW

External links
- Commons: Related media on Commons

Carno is a wind farm of 68 turbines which started operation in October 1996. It covers an area of over 600 hectares on Trannon Moor, a plateau to the west of the village of Carno in Powys, Mid Wales, 400 metres (1,300 ft) above sea level.

Carno currently has the largest production capacity in Wales.

== Specification ==
Originally consisting of 56 wind turbines each of 600 kilowatts (kW) maximum output, the combined maximum power of 33.6 megawatts (MW) made Carno the largest Wind Farm in Europe at the time of its construction. The total project cost was approximately £26 million.
Information:

- Number of turbines: 56 (extended to 68 with Carno 2 in 2008)
- Turbine manufacturer: Bonus Energy A/S, Denmark
- Turbine rating: 600 kW.
- Combined maximum power: 33.6MW
- Tower height to hub: 49 metres (161 ft)
- Blade number and diameter: 3 blades, each 30 metres (98 ft) long
- Annual production: 90 million units
- Wildlife information: 37 species of birds. 512 species of insects & spiders, including one Red Data Book entry, the nationally scarce Trechus rivularis ground beetle.
- Archaeological features: Bronze Age cairns, standing stones and a possible Roman road crossing from east to west.

Public footpaths cross the site and are waymarked on Ordnance Survey maps.

In 2008, an extension designated "Carno 2" was completed, bringing the total number of turbines to 68, comprising 12 new Siemens 1.3MW wind turbines with a hub height of 49 metres (161 ft), blade length of 30 metres (98 ft) and rotor diameter of 62 metres (203 ft) giving a tip height of 79 metres (259 ft).

== Gallery ==
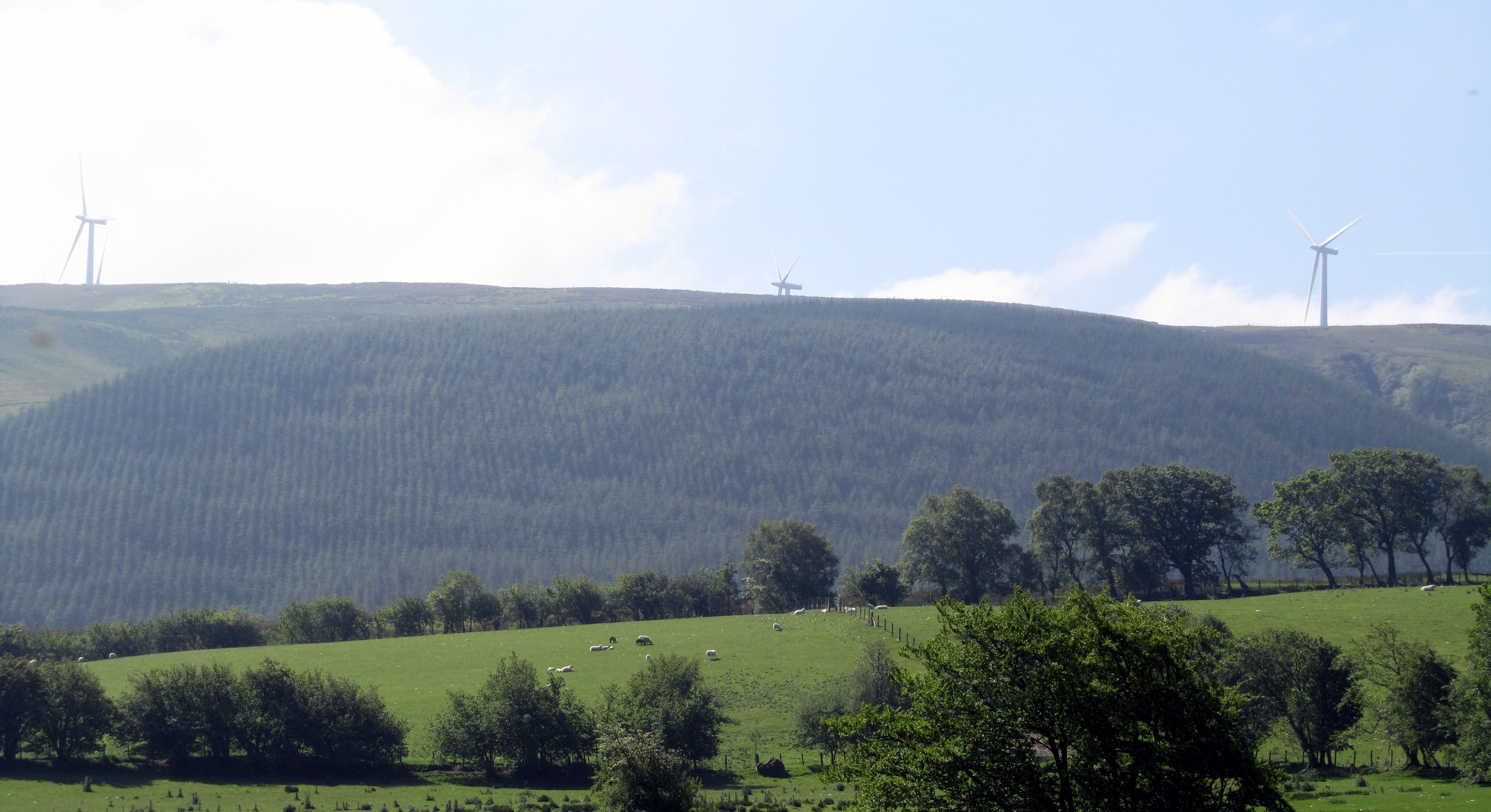
"Carno 2" in June 2011 from Newydd Fynyddog.

== See also ==
- Wind power in the United Kingdom
- npower UK
