= Lammermuir Hills =

Range of hills in southern Scotland

Coordinates: 55°50′N 2°44′W

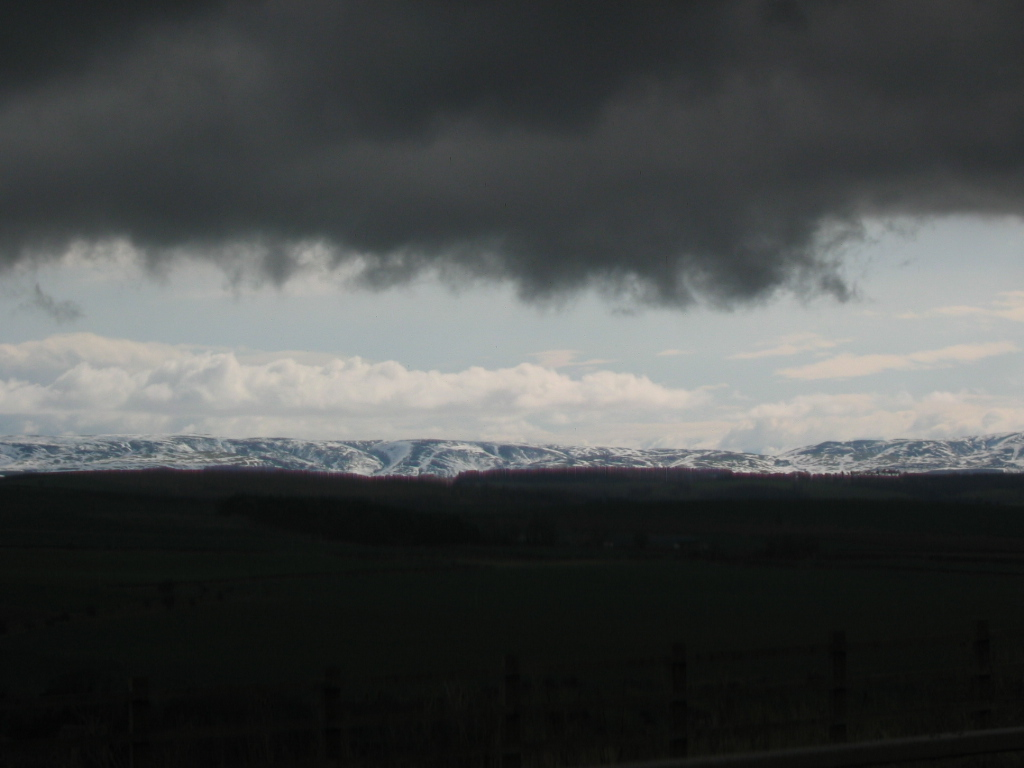
The Lammermuirs in the winter of 2009

The Lammermuirs are a range of hills in southern Scotland, forming a natural boundary between East Lothian and the Borders. The name Lammermuir comes from the Old English lambra mōr, meaning "moorland of the lambs".

== Geology ==
View of the hills from Lammer Law

The Lammermuir Hills are formed from a succession of Silurian and Ordovician age marine sediments known as greywackes together with siltstones, shales and mudstones. They are assigned to the Gala Group. Unconformably overlying these highly faulted and folded strata are outcrops of the early Devonian age Great Conglomerate Formation which forms a part of the Reston Group of Old Red Sandstone rocks. These coarse red-purple conglomerates underlie a band of country in the east between Longformacus and Oldhamstocks and also occur in an isolated outcrop east of Soutra Hill and beneath the Dun Law Wind Farm on the western margin of the hills. The same strata extend down Lauderdale on the western margin of the hills.

Numerous dykes of different lithologies largely of Devonian age but some of Carboniferous age and with a generally NE-SW alignment occur throughout the area. The Priestlaw Intrusion is a mass of late Silurian/early Devonian granite which occurs in the area of Whiteadder Reservoir.

Glacial meltwater channels are common along the northern and eastern margins of the hills, with a notable group beneath Newlands Hill and Dod Law to the southeast of Gifford and north of Deuchrie Edge and Lothian Edge, largely directed towards the northeast in these areas.

== Geography ==
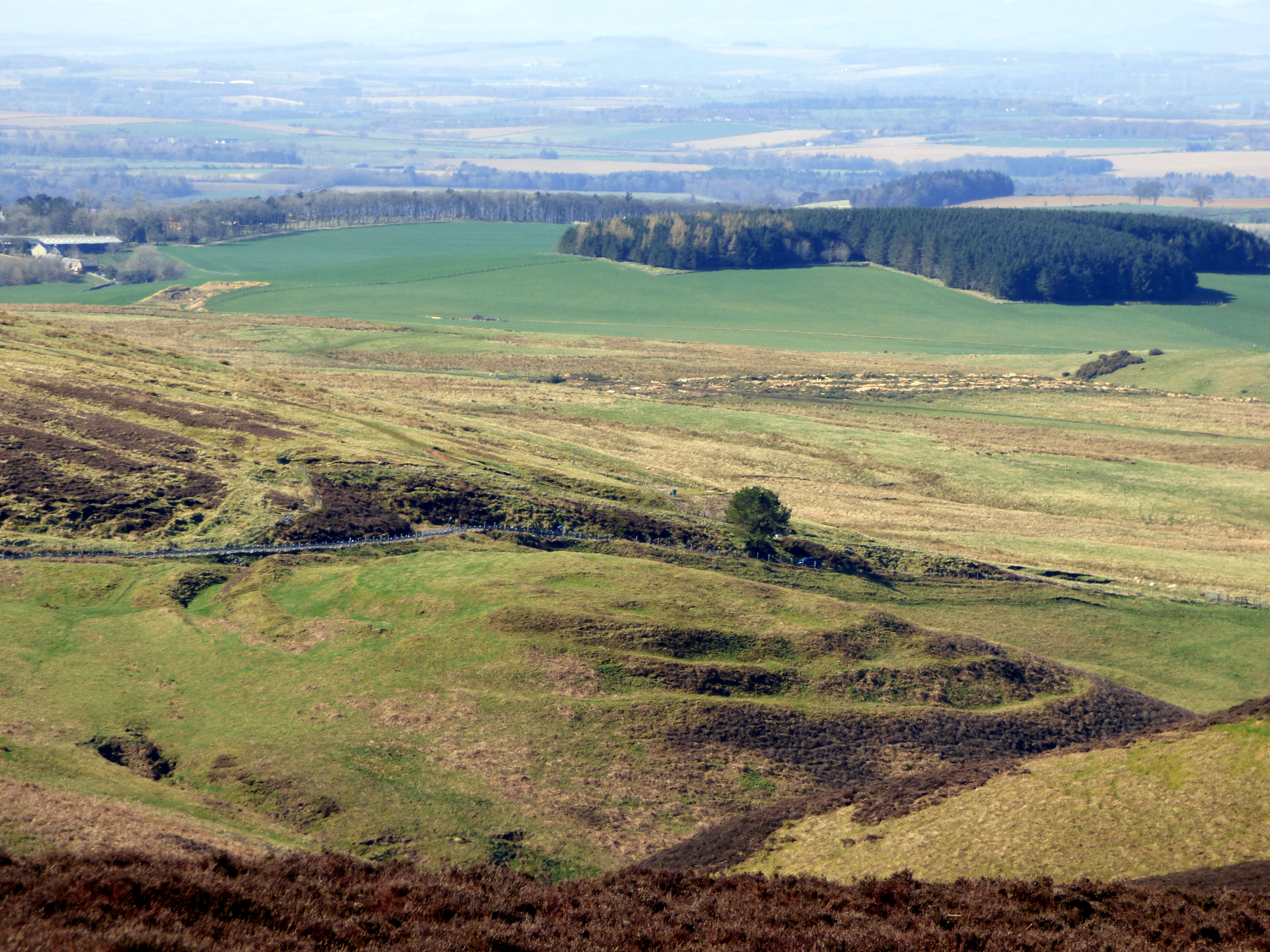
The White Castle

Spanning the counties of Selkirk, East Lothian, and Berwick, the Lammermuirs extend from the Gala Water to St Abb's Head, and offer a traditional site for sheep grazing. The hills are nowhere especially high, the highest points being Meikle Says Law at 535 m (1,755 ft) and the Lammer Law at 528 m (1,732 ft); but steep gradients, exposure to the elements, and a lack of natural passes combine to form a formidable barrier to communications between Edinburgh and the Borders.

The hills are crossed by only one major road (the A68), which crosses the shoulder of Soutra Hill between Lauder and Pathhead, and is frequently closed by snow in winter. The main road linking Edinburgh to England (the A1) avoids the hills by following a circuitous route around the coast.

Crystal Rig Wind Farm is located on the hills.

== Prehistory ==
White Castle was an Iron Age hill fort, settled by the ancestors of the Votadini tribe.

== History ==
The Northumbrian missionary bishop Cuthbert spent his early years as a shepherd on the Lammermuir Hills.

In the 12th century, Melrose Abbey established granges for its sheep flocks at Penshiel, Hartside, Edmundston and Friardykes in the catchment of the Whiteadder, leading to disputes over grazing rights with the tenants of the Earl of Dunbar.

== Cultural and literary significance ==
Sir Walter Scott's novel The Bride of Lammermoor and Gaetano Donizetti's derivative opera Lucia di Lammermoor is set here. Scott lived at Abbotsford House, near Galashiels.

Two ranges of hills in New Zealand, the Lammermoors and Lammerlaws, are named after the Scottish hills.

== See also ==
- List of places in East Lothian
- List of places in the Scottish Borders
- Marilyns in the area
- List of places in Scotland
