= Farr Wind Farm =

Wind farm in Scotland

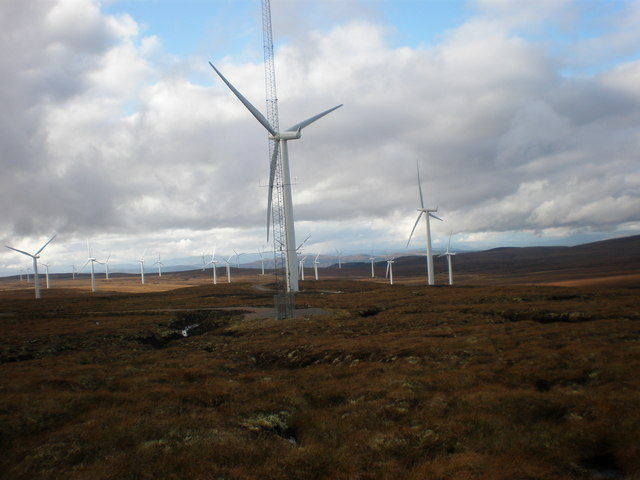
- View of Farr Wind Farm from the east
- Country: Scotland, United Kingdom
- Location: south of Inverness, Highland
- Coordinates: 57°19′30″N 04°05′39″W
- Status: Operational
- Commission date: May 2006
- Owner: Innogy

Wind farm
- Type: Onshore

Power generation
- Units operational: 40 x 2.3 MW
- Make and model: Bonus 2.3MW turbines
- Nameplate capacity: 92 MW

External links
- Commons: Related media on Commons

Farr Wind Farm is located approximately 10 miles (16 km) south of Inverness in Scotland, to the south-east of the Farr area, and to the west of the A9 road. It comprises 40 wind turbines with a total installed capacity of 92 megawatts (MW). Every year the wind farm generates enough clean electricity to meet the average annual needs of some 54,000 homes – enough to supply more than half the homes across the Highlands of Scotland.

Siemens wind power looked after service and maintenance on the wind farm from commissioning until 2017. The windfarm is now staffed by members of Deutsche Windtechnik a German company with a large UK presence.

== See also ==
- Wind power in Scotland
- List of onshore wind farms
