= Forss =

Forss is a surname. Notable people with the surname include:

- George Forss (1941–2021), American photographer
- Henke Forss, Swedish musician from Mjölby
- Julie Forss (born 1998), Finnish footballer
- Marcus Forss (born 1999), Finnish footballer
- Matti Forss (born 1957), retired Finnish professional ice hockey player
- Oskar Forss, drummer, co-founder of the Swedish death metal band Therion
- Rainer Forss (1930–2005), Finnish footballer and manager
- Tero Forss (born 1968), Finnish footballer and manager

== See also ==
- Forss, village in Caithness, Scotland
- Forss Water, known also as Forss River, has its source at the northern end of Loch Shurrey
- Forss, a musical project of SoundCloud co-founder Eric Wahlforss
