= Garves Wind Farm =

Wind farm in County Antrim, Northern Ireland

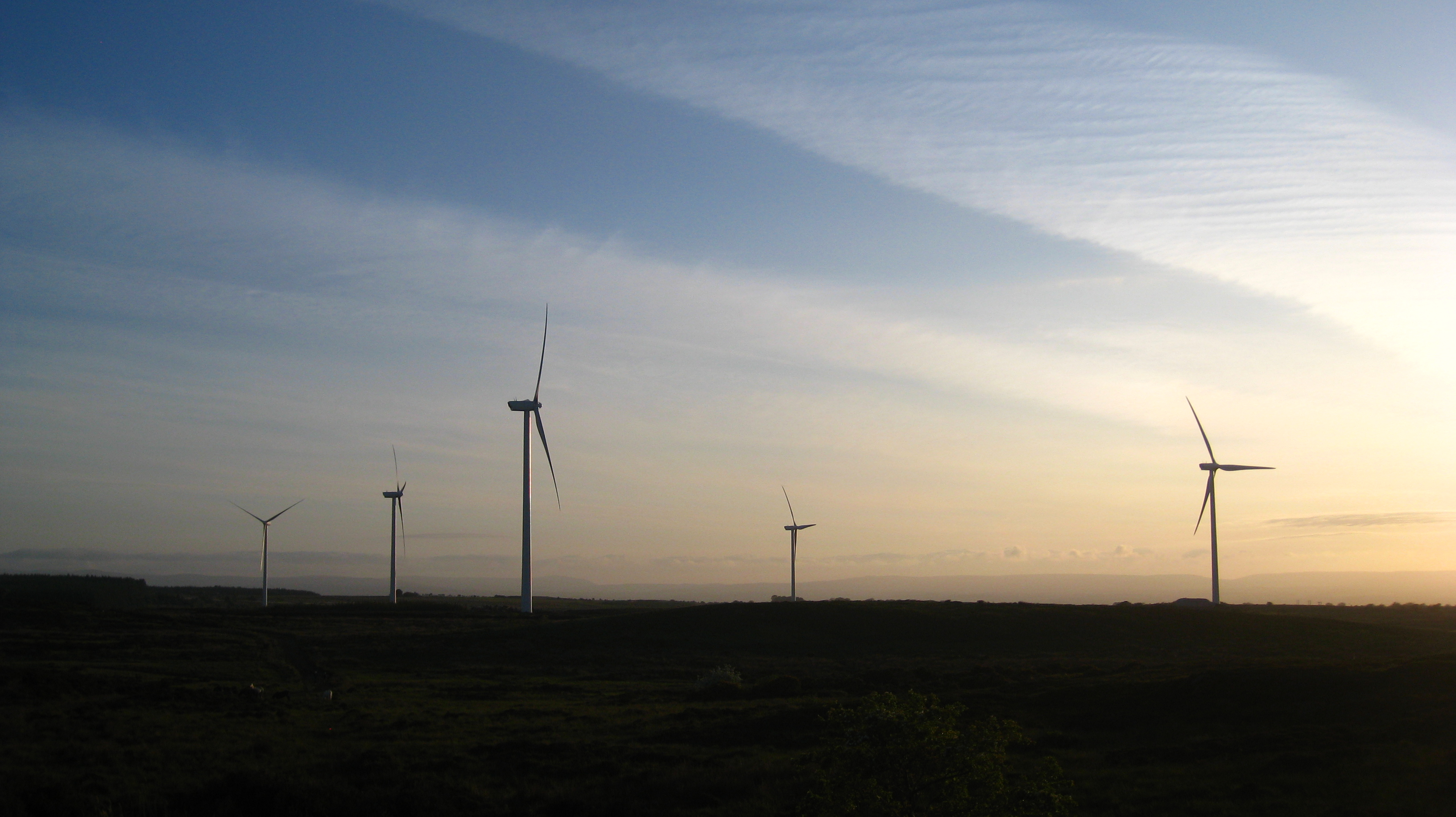
- Garves Wind Farm at sunset
- Country: Northern Ireland, United Kingdom
- Location: near Dunloy in County Antrim
- Coordinates: 55°09′11″N 06°27′17″W
- Status: Operational
- Commission date: January 2009

Power generation
- Units operational: 5
- Make and model: Vestas: V90
- Nameplate capacity: 15 MW

External links
- Commons: Related media on Commons

Garves Wind Farm consists of five turbines with an installed capacity of 15 MW. It is located near Dunloy in County Antrim, Northern Ireland. It is managed by Entap Limited on behalf of Garves Wind Limited. London-based project development company Your Energy Ltd bought the scheme from the original developer in 2007.

The five wind turbines are supplied by Danish company Vestas, the largest wind turbine supplier in the world. The turbines are V90 model with a 3 MW capacity on 80m towers. The wind farm is expected to generate electricity for the equivalent of 8,387 homes annually.

Northern Irish firm Lagan Construction Limited was awarded the balance of plant contract to build the wind farm. Construction started in January 2008 and the wind farm was supplying electricity to the grid by early 2009.

Garves was the first Northern Irish wind farm to be financed in the new single market. The electricity is sold to Viridian Energy Supply Limited through the Single Electricity Market.

The site has been included in the Ballymoney Borough Council's 2009 and 2010 Countryside Walks Programme.

== See also ==
- Energy use and conservation in the United Kingdom
- Energy policy of the United Kingdom
- Wind power in the United Kingdom
