= Novar Wind Farm =

Wind farm in the Scottish Highlands

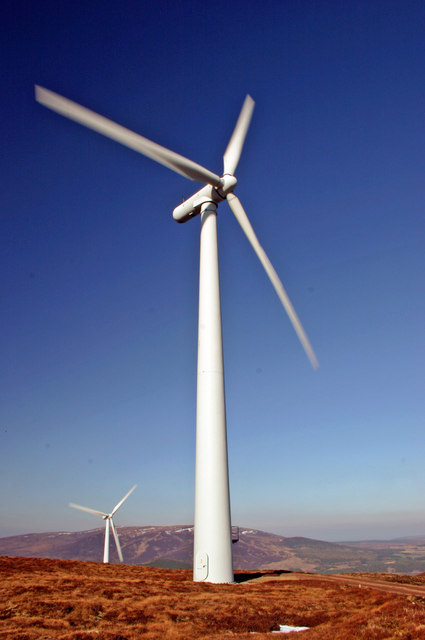
- Country: Scotland, United Kingdom
- Coordinates: 57°42′35.8″N 4°26′16″W
- Status: Operational
- Construction began: Novar A: 1996, Novar B: 2010
- Commission date: Novar A: 1997, Novar B: 2012
- Construction cost: Novar A: £16 million
- Owner: Ventient Energy
- Operator: RWE

Wind farm
- Type: Onshore
- Hub height: Novar A: 42 m (138 ft), Novar B: 65 m (213 ft)
- Rotor diameter: Novar A: 40 m (131 ft) , Novar B: 71 m (233 ft)
- Site area: 7 km^{2} (3 mi^{2})
- Site elevation: 600 m (1,969 ft)

Power generation
- Units operational: Novar A: x34, Novar B: x16
- Make and model: Novar A: Bonus (Siemens) 500kW, Novar B: Enercon E70/2300 2.3MW
- Nameplate capacity: 53.8MW A+B Combined

External links
- Website: www.ventientenergy.com/our-portfolio/novar/

Novar Wind Farm is a 50 turbine, 53.8 megawatt wind farm located in the Scottish Highlands. Constructed in 1997, Novar was of the earlier developments of Scottish on-shore wind generation. It provided a significant contribution to the local economy during construction and through its Community Benefit Fund. In 2010 an additional 16 turbines were constructed taking the yearly generation capacity to 53.8 megawatts.

== Location ==
Novar Wind Farm is made of two sites located on the Novar estate, 5 miles (8.0 km) north-west of the village of Evanton and 5.5 miles (8.9 km) west of the town of Alness. 6 miles (9.7 km) to the south-west lies the Munro Ben Wyvis which is a National Nature Reserve and is a height of 1,046 m (3,432 ft).

The land is predominantly heath land covered in heather but is also used for grazing for sheep. Gravel access roads were built to allow the construction and maintenance of the site.

== Construction ==
Novar A was built and commissioned by Npower (United Kingdom) in 1997 with x34 500 kW Bonus (Siemens) turbines being connected to National Grid (Great Britain). Between 1997 and 2010 ownership changed hands several times until Ventient Energy took it on.

In 2010, RWE began construction to expand the site with the addition of 16 larger 2,300 kW Enercon turbines. In September 2012, The Energy Minister for the Scottish Government, Fergus Ewing officially opened the new site. This increased the generating capacity from 17 megawatts to 53.8 megawatts.

== Community Benefit Fund ==
As with many wind farms in Scotland, a Community Benefit Fund was set up. The fund is a contract whereby the operator agrees to pay a fixed amount to local communities per MWh generated. In this case RWE Innogy who currently operate Novar Wind Farms have agreed to pay £2000 for every megawatt Novar generates.

The money is split between the local community councils of Kiltearn, Ardross, and Alness who then decide how the funds are spent. Often the funds go to local schools for items such as books and toys, or towards helping community groups with funding.
