= Black Law Wind Farm =

Wind farm in Scotland

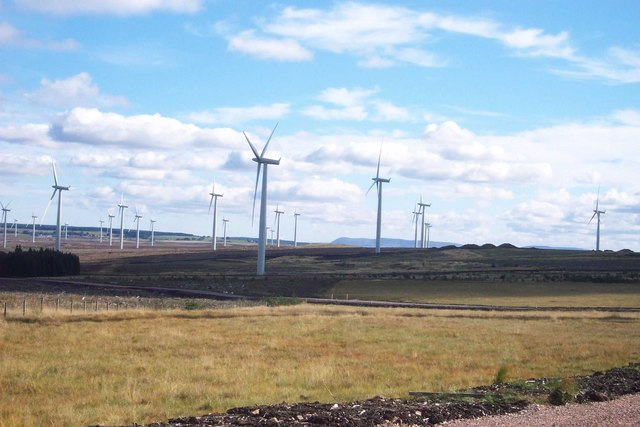
- Black Law Wind Farm with the Pentland Hills in the background
- Country: United Kingdom, Scotland
- Location: near Climpy, South Lanarkshire
- Coordinates: 55°46′01″N 03°44′20″W
- Status: Operational
- Commission date: September 2005
- Construction cost: £90 million
- Owner: Scottish Power

Power generation
- Units operational: 54 x 2.3 MW, 11 x 1.67 MW, 23 x 2 MW,
- Make and model: Siemens 2.3 MW
- Nameplate capacity: 188 MW

External links
- Website: www.scottishpowerrenewables.com/pages/black_law.aspx
- Commons: Related media on Commons

Black Law Wind Farm is an 88 turbine wind farm in South Lanarkshire, Scotland. When it opened in 2006, it was the largest windfarm in the United Kingdom at the time.

The site was approved in 2004. It was originally built at a cost of £90 million with 54-turbines and a total capacity of 124 megawatts (MW). The first phase of 42 turbines was the largest. In 2017, the site was extended with an additional 34 new turbines with an additionalcapacity of 63.4 MW.

Phase 1 was the first built in 2005, consisting of 42 turbines, which at the time was the largest onshore wind farm in the UK. Phase 2 added 12 turbines in 2006, with subsequent extensions in 2017 bringing the total turbine count to 88.

== See also ==
- Wind power in Scotland
- List of onshore wind farms
