= Crystal Rig Wind Farm =

Wind farm in Scotland

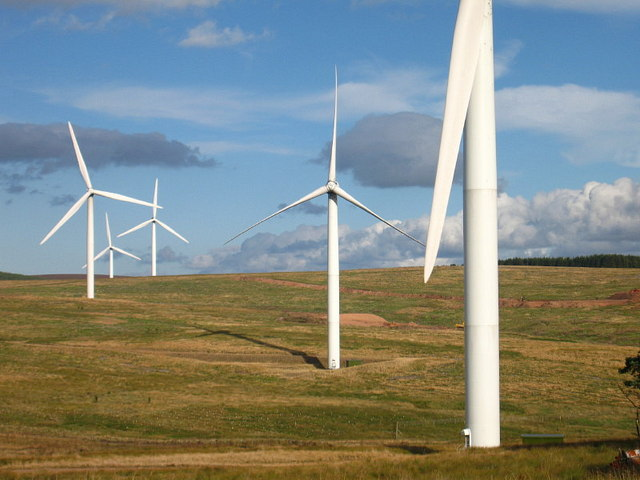
- Crystal Rig wind farm in the Lammermuir Hills
- Country: Scotland, United Kingdom
- Location: near Dunbar, East Lothian / Scottish Borders
- Coordinates: 55°54′N 2°30′W
- Owner: Fred. Olsen Renewables

Wind farm
- Type: Onshore

Power generation
- Units operational: 66 × 2.3 MW; 30 × 2.5 MW
- Make and model: Nordex N80/2500 (30); Siemens Gamesa SWT-2.3-93 (66)
- Nameplate capacity: 200.5 MW

External links
- Commons: Related media on Commons

Crystal Rig Wind Farm is an operational onshore wind farm located on the Lammermuir Hills in the Scottish Borders region of Scotland. When phase 1 was completed in May 2004 it was the largest wind farm in Scotland. As a result of 3 extensions it is currently the second largest wind farm in the UK, in terms of nameplate capacity and one of the top five largest in number of turbines.

The wind farm was developed and is owned by Fred. Olsen Renewables Ltd. part of the Fred. Olsen Group and is managed by Natural Power, another member of the Fred Olsen group. Turbine maintenance and service is carried out by technicians from Nordex and Siemens. Since the completion of Crystal Rig 2 in 2010, Siemens have based their main service centre for all wind farms in the South East with Siemens turbines in use at the turbine control centre at Crystal Rig whose offices are shared with Natural Power. This enables Siemens technicians with easy access to all 60 turbines on site and to the nearby wind farms of Aikengall 2, Carcant, Toddleburn and Black Hill wind farms. Nordex base their service centre in Loanhead which is based halfway between Crystal Rig 1/1A and Bowbeat Wind Farm where 24 Nordex N60 Turbines fall on the Moorfoot Hills.

The farm was built in several stages:

Crystal Rig: Completed in May 2004 it consists of 20 Nordex N80 turbines producing a maximum of 50 MW.

Crystal Rig 1a: An extension completed in May 2007 adding a further 5 N80 turbines to increase the maximum to 62.5 MW.

Crystal Rig 2 & 2a: Both completed in September 2010 they consist of 60 Siemens SWT-2.3 turbines in total capable of producing 138 MW.

Crystal Rig III: Six additional Siemens 2.3 MW turbines capable of producing 13.8 MW, completed in 2016.

Crystal Rig IV: A planned extension of an additional 11 turbines which will bring the wind farm's capacity total up to 262.5 MW.

Crystal Rig 1 and 1a are connected to the Scottish Power Transmission network at the Dunbar substation 10 km to the north. A dedicated substation was built on site for the connection of Crystal Rig 2 and 2a.
