= Climate of Wales =

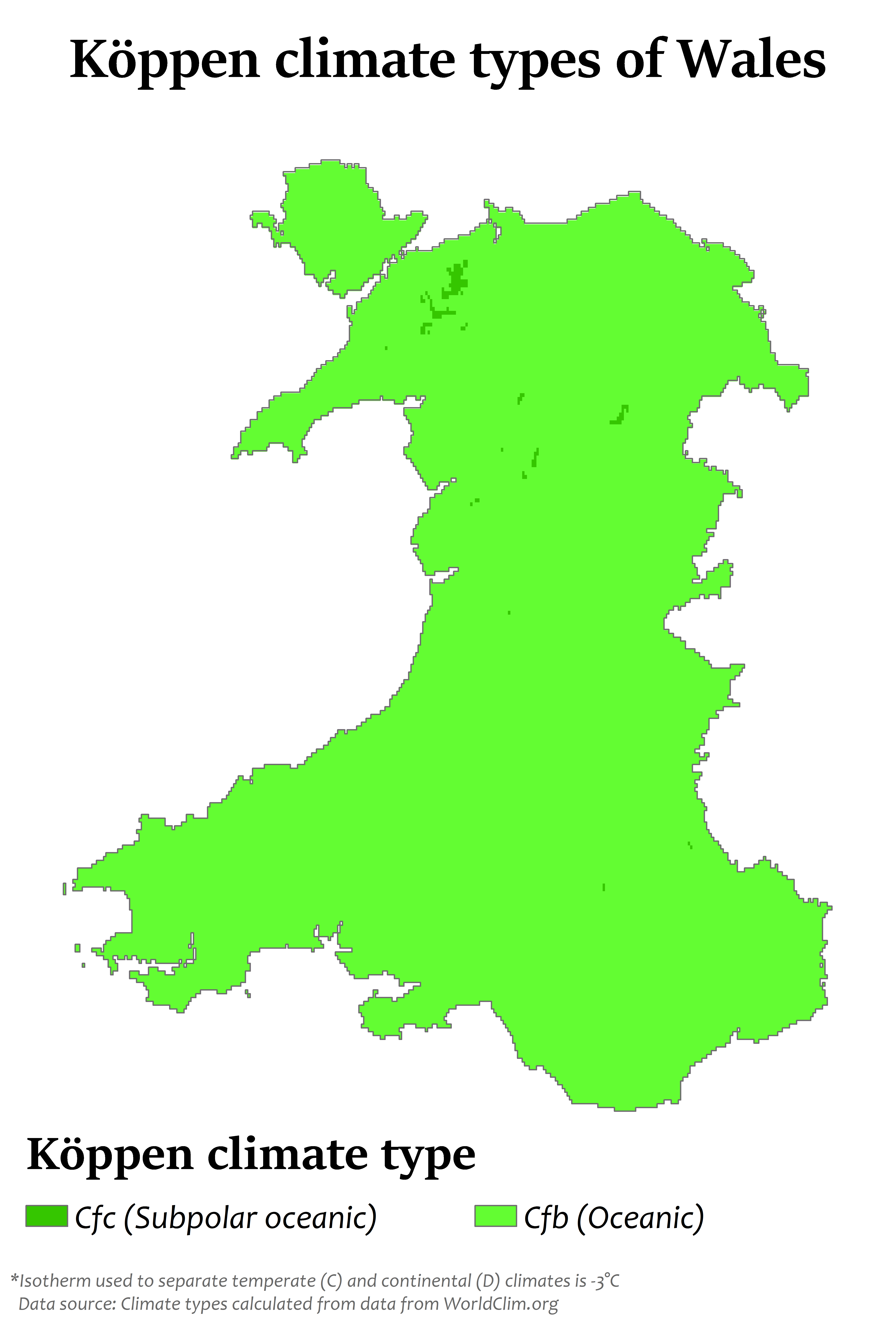
A map of Köppen climate types in Wales

The climate of Wales refers to the weather conditions prevailing in Wales in general or over a long period.

Wales has warmer temperatures throughout the year than Northern Ireland and Scotland and has milder winter minima than England, but cooler winter maxima than Northern Ireland. Wales is wetter throughout the year than Northern Ireland and England, but has fewer rainy days than Northern Ireland; meaning that rainfall tends to be more intense. Wales is also drier than Scotland in every month apart from May, June and December, and there are fewer days with rain than in Scotland. Sunshine totals throughout the year are more than that of Scotland and Northern Ireland, but less than that of neighbouring England. May is the sunniest month, averaging 186.8 hours.

== Climate ==
=== Sunshine ===
The south-western coast is the sunniest part of Wales, averaging over 1700 hours of sunshine annually, with Tenby, Pembrokeshire, its sunniest town. The dullest time of year is between November and January and the sunniest between May and August. The least sunny areas are the mountains, some parts of which average less than 1200 hours of sunshine annually.

=== Wind ===
The prevailing wind is south-westerly. Coastal areas are the windiest, gales occur most often during winter, on average between 15 and 30 days each year, depending on location. Inland, gales average fewer than six days annually.

=== Daylight hours ===
Wales experiences long summer days and short winter days result of northerly latitudes (between 53° 43′ N and 51° 38′ N). Aberystwyth, at the midpoint of the country's west coast, has nearly 17 hours of daylight at the summer solstice. Daylight at midwinter there falls to just over seven and a half hours.

=== Geographic variations ===
The country's wide geographic variations cause localised differences in sunshine, rainfall and temperature. Average annual coastal temperatures reach 10.5 °C (51 °F) and in low lying inland areas, 1 °C (1.8 °F) lower. It becomes cooler at higher altitudes; annual temperatures decrease on average approximately 0.5 °C (0.9 °F) each 100 metres (330 feet) of altitude. Consequently, the higher parts of Snowdonia experience average annual temperatures of 5 °C (41 °F).

=== Temperature ===
Temperatures in Wales remain higher than would otherwise be expected at its latitude because of the North Atlantic Drift, a branch of the Gulf Stream. The ocean current, bringing warmer water to northerly latitudes, has a similar effect on most of north-west Europe. As well as its influence on Wales's coastal areas, air warmed by the Gulf Stream blows further inland with the prevailing winds. At low elevations, summers tend to be warm and sunny. Average maximum temperatures range between 19 and 22 °C (66 and 72 °F). Winters tend to be fairly wet, rainfall is excessive and the temperature usually stays above freezing. Spring and autumn feel quite similar and the temperatures tend to stay above 14 °C (57 °F) – also the average annual daytime temperature.

=== Rainfall ===
Rainfall patterns show significant variation. The further west, the higher the expected rainfall; up to 40 per cent more. At low elevations, rain is unpredictable at any time of year, although the showers tend to be shorter in summer. The uplands of Wales have the most rain, normally more than 50 days of rain during the winter months (December to February), falling to around 35 rainy days during the summer months (June to August). Annual rainfall in Snowdonia averages between 3,000 millimetres (120 in) (Blaenau Ffestiniog) and 5,000 millimetres (200 in) (Snowdon's summit).

=== Snow ===
The likelihood is that it will fall as sleet or snow when the temperature falls below 5 °C (41 °F) and snow tends to be lying on the ground there for an average of 30 days a year. Snow falls several times each winter in inland areas but is relatively uncommon around the coast. Average annual rainfall in those areas can be less than 1,000 millimetres (39 in).

== Climate data for Wales ==
Climate data for Wales (1991–2020 normals, extremes 1865-present)
Month	Jan	Feb	Mar	Apr	May	Jun	Jul	Aug	Sep	Oct	Nov	Dec	Year
Record high °C (°F)	18.3 (64.9)	20.8 (69.4)	23.9 (75.0)	26.2 (79.2)	32.2 (90.0)	35.1 (95.2)	37.1 (98.8)	35.3 (95.5)	32.3 (90.1)	28.2 (82.8)	22.4 (72.3)	18.0 (64.4)	37.1 (98.8)
Mean daily maximum °C (°F)	7.04 (44.67)	7.36 (45.25)	9.34 (48.81)	12.17 (53.91)	15.21 (59.38)	17.69 (63.84)	19.34 (66.81)	18.99 (66.18)	16.87 (62.37)	13.30 (55.94)	9.89 (49.80)	7.58 (45.64)	12.93 (55.27)
Mean daily minimum °C (°F)	1.73 (35.11)	1.59 (34.86)	2.57 (36.63)	4.12 (39.42)	6.64 (43.95)	9.34 (48.81)	11.26 (52.27)	11.22 (52.20)	9.30 (48.74)	6.91 (44.44)	4.18 (39.52)	2.16 (35.89)	5.94 (42.69)
Record low °C (°F)	−23.3 (−9.9)	−20.0 (−4.0)	−21.7 (−7.1)	−11.2 (11.8)	−6.2 (20.8)	−4.0 (24.8)	−1.5 (29.3)	−2.8 (27.0)	−5.5 (22.1)	−9.4 (15.1)	−18.0 (−0.4)	−22.7 (−8.9)	−23.3 (−9.9)
Average precipitation mm (inches)	155.22 (6.11)	120.42 (4.74)	103.48 (4.07)	88.00 (3.46)	87.11 (3.43)	92.08 (3.63)	98.56 (3.88)	111.77 (4.40)	111.48 (4.39)	158.49 (6.24)	162.25 (6.39)	175.80 (6.92)	1,464.65 (57.66)
Average precipitation days (≥ 1 mm)	17.13	14.12	13.73	12.50	12.04	11.82	12.78	13.83	13.03	16.33	17.94	17.87	173.12
Mean monthly sunshine hours	47.21	69.15	109.77	157.75	190.94	178.14	176.97	159.70	129.44	91.46	55.34	41.25	1,407.11
Source: The Met Office: averages, sunshine, precipitation; extremes

== Climate chart ==
Wales 1991-2020

Climate chart (precipitation, max. and min. temperature)
J	F	M	A	M	J	J	A	S	O	N	D
155 7 2	120 7 2	103 9 3	88 12 4	87 15 7	92 18 9	99 19 11	112 19 11	111 17 9	158 13 7	162 10 4	176 8 2
- █ Average max. and min. temperatures in °C
- █ Precipitation totals in mm
Imperial conversion
J	F	M	A	M	J	J	A	S	O	N	D
6.1 45 35	4.7 45 35	4.1 49 37	3.5 54 39	3.4 59 44	3.6 64 49	3.9 67 52	4.4 66 52	4.4 62 49	6.2 56 44	6.4 50 40	6.9 46 36
- █ Average max. and min. temperatures in °F
- █ Precipitation totals in inches

This climate chart provides an overview of the climate in Wales during a year period. The letters in the top row stand for months: January, February, etc. The bars and numbers convey the following information: The blue bars represent the amount of precipitation (rain, snow etc.) that falls in each month. The blue numbers are the amount of precipitation in either millimeters (liters per square meter) or inches. The red numbers are the average daily high and low temperatures for each month, and the red bars represent the average daily temperature span for each month. The thin gray line is 0 °C or 32 °F, the point of freezing, for orientation.

== Record temperatures for Wales ==
Below is a list of record temperatures for Wales according to the UK Met Office.

Absolute temperature ranges for Wales
Month	Maximum temperatures				Minimum temperatures			
Month	Temperature	Location	County	Date (day/year)	Temperature	Location	County	Date (day/year)
January	18.3 °C (64.9 °F)	Abergwyngregyn	Gwynedd	10/1971 and 27/1958	−23.3 °C (−9.9 °F)	Rhayader	Powys	21/1940
February	20.8 °C (69.4 °F)	Porthmadog	Gwynedd	21/2019	−20.0 °C (−4.0 °F)	Welshpool	Powys	2/1954
March	23.9 °C (75.0 °F)	Prestatyn	Denbighshire	29/1965	−21.7 °C (−7.1 °F)	Corwen	Denbighshire	14/1958
March	23.9 °C (75.0 °F)	Ceinws	Powys	29/1965	−21.7 °C (−7.1 °F)	Corwen	Denbighshire	14/1958
April	26.2 °C (79.2 °F)	Gogerddan	Ceredigion	16/2003	−11.2 °C (11.8 °F)	Corwen	Denbighshire	11/1978
May	32.2 °C (90.0 °F)	Hawarden	Flintshire	25/2026	−6.2 °C (20.8 °F)	St Harmon	Powys	14/2020
June	35.1 °C (95.2 °F)	Hawarden	Flintshire	26/2026	−4.0 °C (24.8 °F)	St Harmon	Powys	8/1985
July	37.1 °C (98.8 °F)	Hawarden	Flintshire	18/2022	−1.5 °C (29.3 °F)	St Harmon	Powys	3/1984
August	35.3 °C (95.5 °F)	Gogerddan	Ceredigion	12/2026	−2.8 °C (27.0 °F)	Alwen	Conwy	29/1959
September	32.3 °C (90.1 °F)	Hawarden Bridge	Flintshire	1/1906	−5.5 °C (22.1 °F)	St Harmon	Powys	19/1986
October	28.2 °C (82.8 °F)	Hawarden Airport	Flintshire	1/2011	−9.4 °C (15.1 °F)	Rhayader and Penvalley	Powys	26/1931
November	22.4 °C (72.3 °F)	Trawsgoed	Ceredigion	1/2015	−18.0 °C (−0.4 °F)	Llysdinam	Powys	28/2010
December	18.0 °C (64.4 °F)	Abergwyngregyn	Gwynedd	18/1972	−22.7 °C (−8.9 °F)	Corwen	Denbighshire	13/1981

== See also ==
- Environment Wales
- Environmental issues in Wales
- Renewable energy in Wales
