= Cabinet Secretary for Climate Change =

Welsh Government cabinet minister

Cabinet Secretary for Climate Change of Wales
- Ysgrifennydd y Cabinet dros Newid Hinsawdd (Welsh)
- Welsh Government
- Style: Welsh Cabinet Secretary
- Status: Cabinet Secretary
- Abbreviation: Secretary
- Member of: Senedd; Cabinet
- Reports to: the Senedd and the First Minister of Wales
- Seat: Cardiff
- Nominator: First Minister of Wales
- Appointer: The Crown
- Term length: Five years; Subject to elections to the Senedd which take place every five years
- First holder: Julie James MS
- Website: gov.wales/huw-irranca-davies-ms

The Cabinet Secretary for Climate Change (Welsh: Ysgrifennydd y Cabinet dros Newid Hinsawdd) was a member of the Cabinet in the Welsh Government. The most recent officeholder was Huw Irranca-Davies from March 2024 to May 2026.

== Ministers ==
Name	Picture	Entered office	Left office	Other offices held	Political party	Government
Minister for Climate Change
Julie James		13 May 2021	20 March 2024		Labour	Second Drakeford government
Cabinet Secretary for Climate Change
Huw Irranca-Davies		21 March 2024	12 May 2026		Labour	Gething government

== Responsibilities ==
The post's responsibilities were:

- Climate change, natural resources and energy responsibilities
  - Marine and freshwater planning, biodiversity, conservation and licensing
  - Ensuring land policy is used optimally and most versatile, advise on the restoration of mineral sites, Agricultural Land Classification and implementing EIA (Agriculture) Regulations
  - Energy policy, which includes small and medium-scale energy production, domestic energy and energy efficiency
  - Renewable energy in Wales
  - Climate change, addressed with carbon budgets and emission reduction targets
  - Natural resources management, including oversight and implementation of the Environment (Wales) Act, as well as overseeing Natural Resources Wales
  - Cross-cutting mitigation and adaption measures relating to climate change, including the involvement of water, flooding (and coastal) risk, land drainage, and controlling marine and air pollution.
  - Coal tip safety in Wales
  - Water
  - Forestry policy and legislation, including restocking and the monitoring of the health of trees, and "forest reproductive material"
  - National Forest for Wales
  - Biodiversity policy, including the Nature Recovery Plan's implementation
  - Sustainable use of resources, and waste management
  - Managing the quality of the local environment, including litter, fly-tipping, the Deposit Return Scheme, noise policy and regulation
  - National Parks
  - Leading allotment and urban green infrastructure strategy
  - Community Green Spaces
  - Countryside, coast, right of way, and waterways/water bodies access
  - Areas of Outstanding Natural Beauty

== See also ==
- Government of Wales
- Ministry
