= Environmental issues in Wales =

Overview of environmental challenges facing Wales

Various environmental issues are facing Wales, including climate change, pollution and ecosystem loss, and the various policies to address them.

== Climate change ==
Emissions are reducing in Wales. After 2016, shutting the last coal-fired power station in Wales contributed "toward half" of the fall in emissions in 2016. Over the last 30 years, there has been a 31% cut in emissions. The goal for 2030 is to have reached a 63% reduction, and by 2050 to reach net-zero carbon emission. These aims are a significant challenge.

The Welsh Government owns a company, Ynni Cymru, which funds community energy projects. The Welsh Government owns a company, Trydan Gwyrdd Cymru to develop state-owned energy - specifically offshore wind. Trydan Gwyrdd Cymru has been suggested as a model for Great British Energy.

The Environment (Wales) Act 2016 required the Welsh Government to set reduced emission targets by the end of 2018.

== Recycling capabilities ==
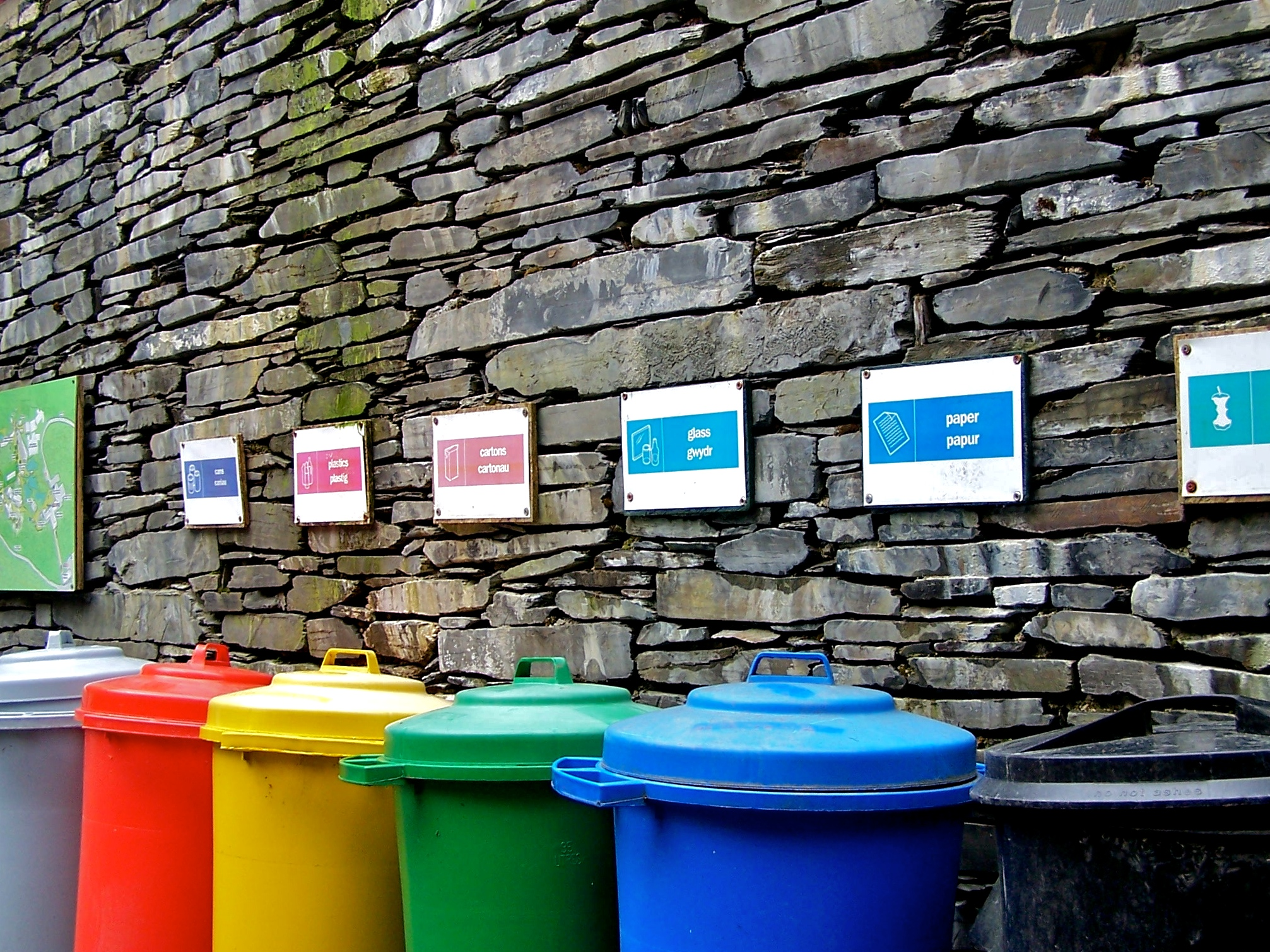
Recycling bins, Machynlleth, Wales.

Wales' recycling rate was 4.8% in 1998–1999 but has now risen to 65.4% in 2021, ranking Wales as the third-best recycling country in the world, behind only Germany and Taiwan. the Welsh Government states that this has been helped by a £1 billion investment since the establishment of the Senedd in 1999. The high rate of recycling household waste in Wales is said to avoid the release of 400,000 tonnes of CO_{2} into the atmosphere each year and is a "key" contribution to reducing climate change.

The Welsh Government’s circular economy plans states a plan to achieve zero waste in Wales by 2050.

Air PollutionAnalysis of Imperial College London data by the Central Office of Public Interest (COPI), a campaign group, found that 93% of people in Wales lived in postcodes that were exposed to air that breached at least one WHO limit for toxic pollutants.

== Sustainable development and wellbeing of future generations ==
The Centre for Alternative Technology (CAT) is an eco-centre in Powys, mid-Wales, dedicated to demonstrating and teaching sustainable development. CAT, despite its name, no longer concentrates its efforts exclusively on alternative technology, but provides information on all aspects of sustainable living.

Wales has legislation promoting sustainable development and the wellbeing of future generations and has a commissioner whose responsibility is to monitor progress against these goals.

== Coal tips ==
Wales has numerous coal tips, as a legacy of its coal industry. It is estimated it is home to 40% of all UK coal tips. Almost all coal tips are disused, however they continue to present safety risks, such as the possibility of pollution, landslides, flooding and spontaneous combustion. Climate change has been connected to the increasing intensity of rainfall in the winter and flash flooding, increasing the risk of coal tips becoming more unstable.

Following Storm Dennis, a slip occurred at the Llanwonno coal tip and after the slip, it was revealed no national list of coal tips existed.

== Disposable products ==
In 2023, single-use plastics were banned from being sold in Wales. In 2025, single-use vapes are to be banned across the United Kingdom on environmental grounds.

== Nature loss and biodiversity ==
In 2025, the Welsh Government was criticised for not doing enough to restore nature according to the deputy chair of Natural Resources Wales.

== Natural Resources Wales ==
Funding cuts and excessive bureaucracy have hampered Natural Resources Wales' ability to regulate rivers and agriculture.

== Water ==
Dŵr Cymru Welsh Water is the main water company serving Wales and uses a "not-for-profit" business model. Across 2025-2030, water bills may significantly increase in order to deal with river pollution issues for customers of Dŵr Cymru Welsh Water. The management of Dŵr Cymru Welsh Water has been criticised by former Economy Minister Andrew Davies for accumulating a high level of debt and paying large dividends to their shareholders and owners.

In 2023, the Welsh Government requested a delay in the transfer of powers regarding water.

== See also ==
- Environment Wales
- Renewable energy in Wales
- Transport in Wales, Housing in Wales
- Wales Green Party
