= Trydan Gwyrdd Cymru =

Welsh publicly-owned energy company

Trydan Gwyrdd Cymru Ltd
- Type: State-owned enterprise
- Industry: Renewable energy
- Founded: March 2024
- Founder: Welsh Government
- Headquarters: Merthyr Tydfil, Wales, United Kingdom
- Area served: Wales
- Key people: Richard Evans (CEO); Rebecca Evans, Cabinet Secretary for the Economy
- Services: Onshore wind energy
- Owner: Welsh Government
- Website: Trydan Gwyrdd Cymru

Trydan Gwyrdd Cymru (Welsh for 'green electricity Wales') is a publicly-owned renewable energy developer established by the Welsh Government in March 2024 and launched in July 2024. The company is tasked with aiding the development of renewable energy projects, particularly focusing on onshore wind, across the Welsh public estate.

As a wholly owned entity of the Welsh Government, Trydan's remit is defined by the government, with oversight provided by the Cabinet Secretary for the Economy. Trydan Gwyrdd Cymru differs from Ynni Cymru, another initiative launched by the Welsh Government aimed at expanding community-owned renewable energy projects.

== Background and launch ==
The Welsh Government first announced plans to establish a state-owned renewable energy developer to the Senedd on 25 October 2022, in response to energy insecurities and the rising cost of living. Julie James, the Cabinet Secretary for Climate Change, emphasised the government's desire for a state-owned renewable energy developer to benefit Wales. On 2 August 2023, the Welsh Government officially named the developer Trydan Gwyrdd Cymru.

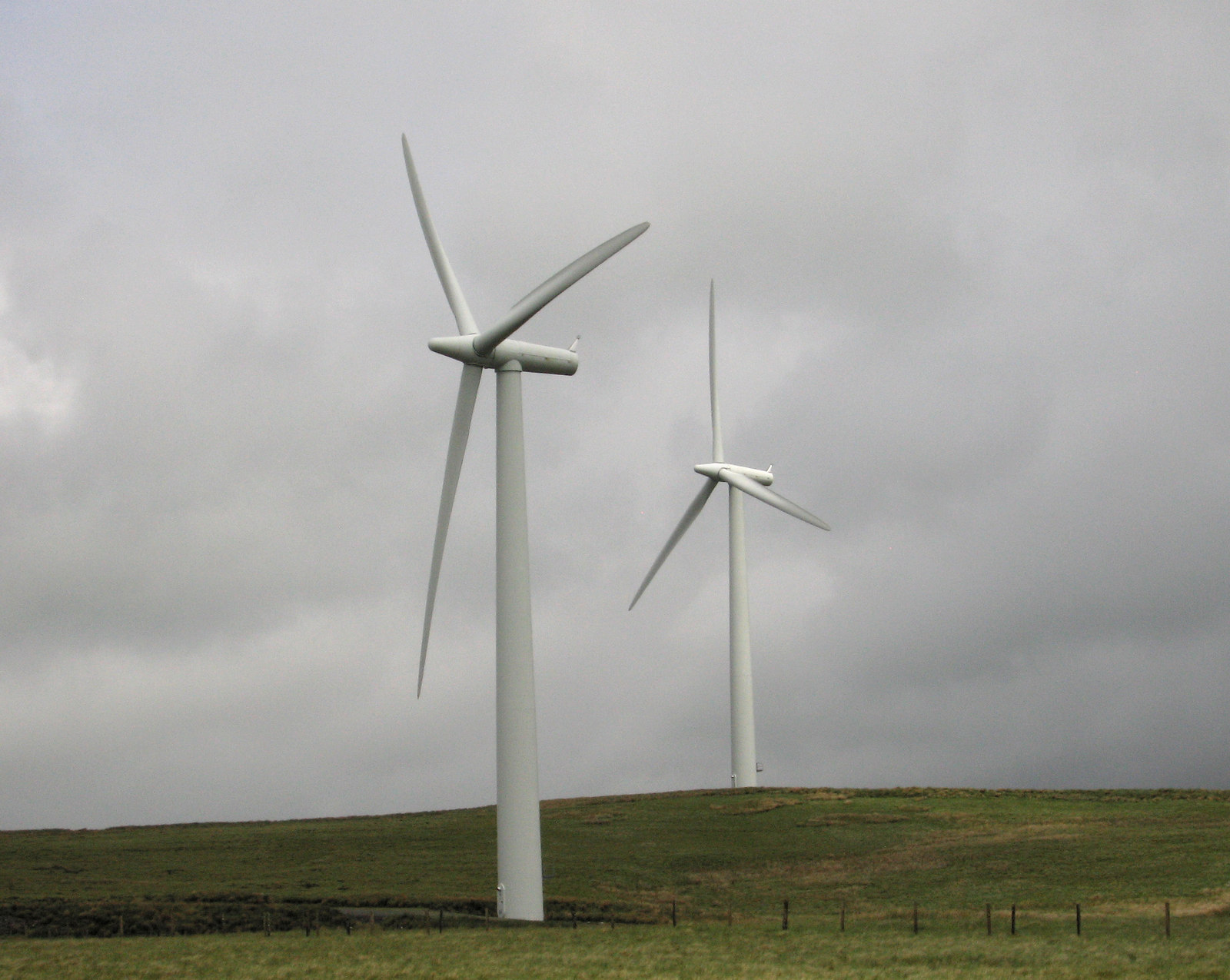
Carno II Wind Farm in Wales

Trydan Gwyrdd Cymru was officially launched on 15 July 2024 by Economy Secretary Jeremy Miles in Bryncynon, a former mining community in the South Wales Valleys. The establishment of the company is part of the Welsh Government's strategy to promote sustainable energy supply decarbonisation efforts within the region.

UK Energy Secretary Ed Miliband expressed support for Trydan.

== Objectives and development plans ==
The goals of Trydan Gwyrdd Cymru are to "harness the renewable energy potential of Wales, delivering benefits to society, the environment, and the economy." The company aims to develop a minimum of 250 megawatts (MW) of new renewable energy generation capacity by 2030, with a further target of 750 MW by 2040, contingent upon grid capacity availability.

Headquartered in Merthyr Tydfil, Trydan will initially collaborate with Natural Resources Wales to develop wind farms on the publicly owned Welsh Government Woodland Estate, which covers over 126,000 hectares and constitutes nearly 6% of Wales's total land area.

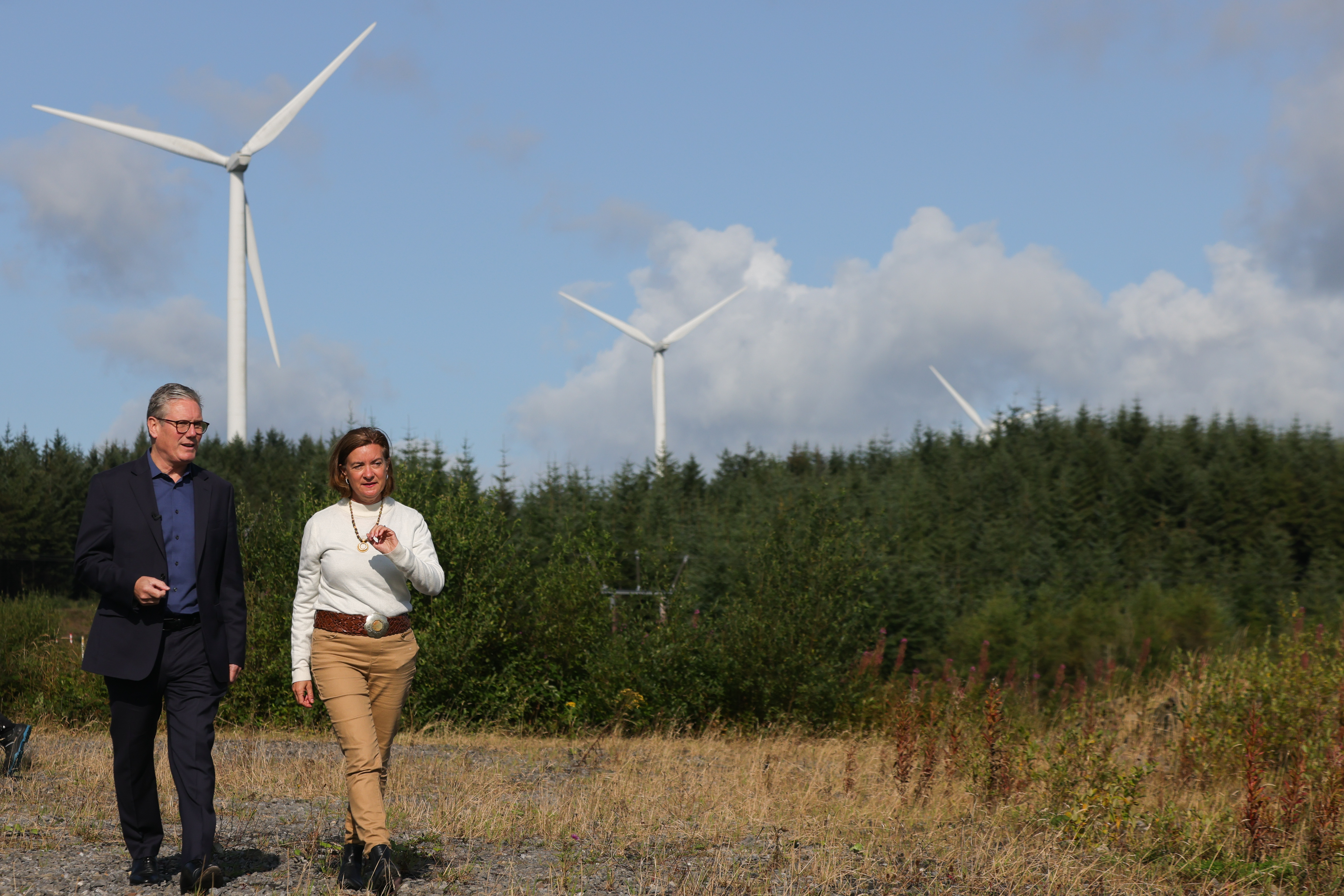
Prime Minister Keir Starmer and First Minister Eluned Morgan visiting a windfarm in Carmarthenshire

In August 2024, UK Prime Minister Keir Starmer and Welsh First Minister Eluned Morgan visited a wind farm in West Wales, pledging to enhance collaboration on renewable energy development. They committed to leveraging both Trydan Gwyrdd Cymru and the newly established Great British Energy. Starmer emphasised the importance of these initiatives for energy independence and job creation, while Morgan highlighted Trydan Gwyrdd Cymru’s role in ensuring local communities benefit from the transition to net-zero energy.

== See also ==
- Renewable energy in Wales
- Energy in Wales
- Great British Energy
- Ynni Cymru
- Vattenfall
