= Ynni Cymru =

Welsh government energy programme

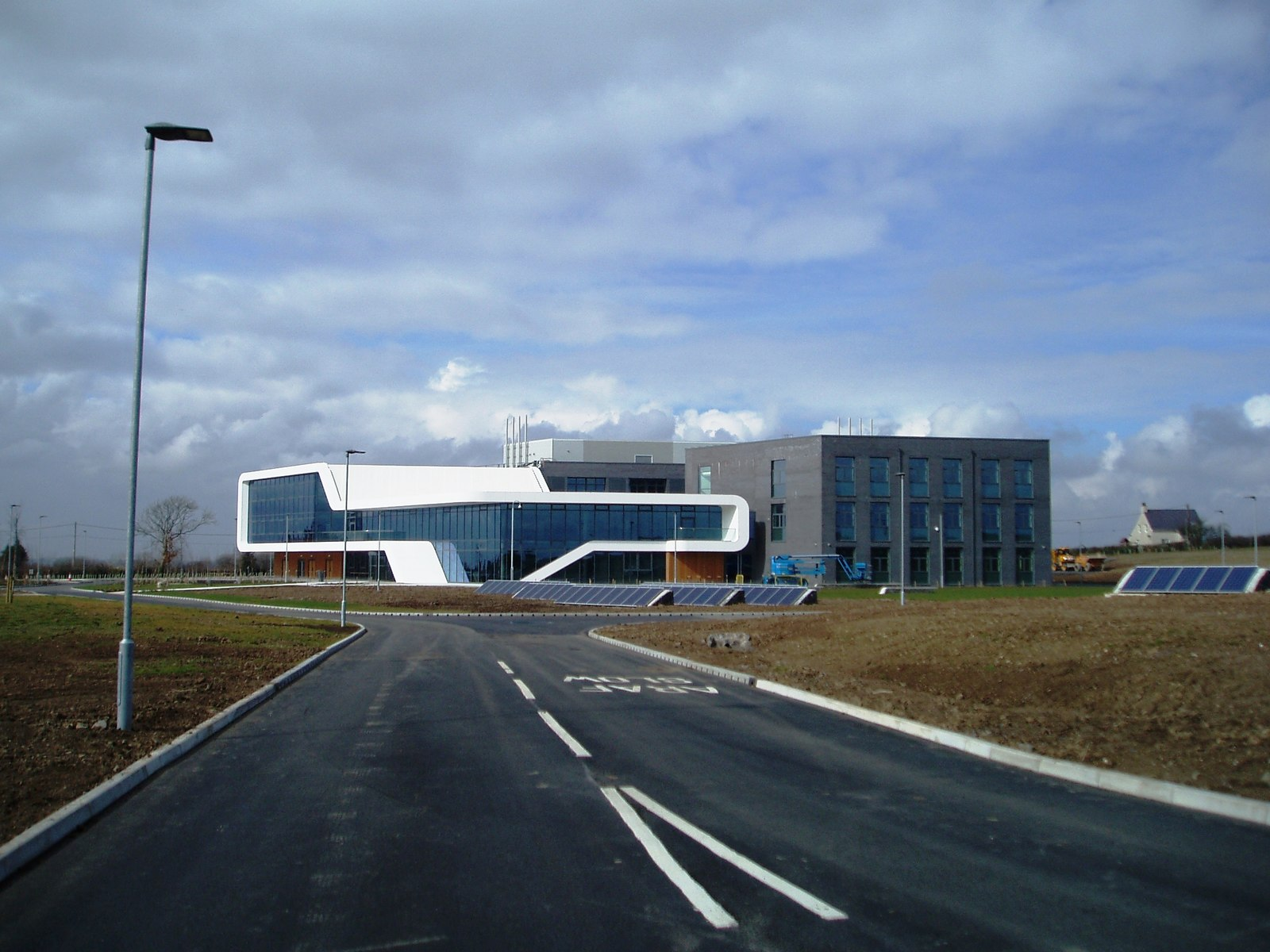
- M-SParc, where the company is proposed to be based
- Industry: Energy
- Founded: 7 August 2023 (as a programme)
- Headquarters: M-SParc, Anglesey, Wales
- Owner: Welsh Government

Ynni Cymru (Welsh for 'energy Wales') is an energy programme of the Welsh Government. It was to be established as a publicly owned energy company that would be based in Anglesey, Wales. It was launched in August 2023, and it aimed to support investment in Welsh community-owned renewable energy generation, although its full responsibility in the projects it funds are still to be determined.

Proposals for a company have been raised by Plaid Cymru since at least 2016, and was included in the 2021 Welsh Labour–Plaid Cymru agreement, which was followed by a commitment by the government to first explore the concept, and later to establish the company. It currently funds eleven projects in Wales using grants under its name.

Ynni Cymru differs from Trydan Gwyrdd Cymru, a state-owned company launched by the Welsh Government in 2024, which is a renewable energy developer.

== Background and history ==
=== Initial Plaid Cymru proposals ===
Ynni Cymru was raised by Simon Thomas, an AM for Plaid Cymru, in December 2016 to the Institute of Welsh Affairs, with it being debated in the Welsh Assembly in June 2018, and repeated by Plaid Cymru in April 2021. The party proposed it should be based in Anglesey and be a national not-for-dividend arms-length "project development company" of the Welsh Government. It was compared to Transport for Wales and the Development Bank of Wales. It was proposed that it would oversee and invest in the private sector and invest its profits in improving services and prices. Plaid argued such a company would focus on zero carbon electricity generation, develop an "energy atlas" of areas in Wales with "green energy potential", to identify opportunities to develop firms and projects, and develop a network of regional and local energy companies to fit local demand. Plaid proposed the company should aim to reduce the cost and consumption of energy in homes and businesses, make Wales self-sufficient and an exporter of renewable energy, and increasing the use of smart meters to improve the decision making of consumers. It was proposed to fund the mass installation of solar panels on buildings and lampposts, while outsourcing the projects to local companies, develop the use of publicly owned land for renewable energy use, and to develop large-scale energy generation and storage capacity.

=== Welsh Government announcement ===
In October 2021, the Welsh Government announced it was looking into the concept of a publicly owned energy company, and whether such a company would improve the use of renewable energy in Wales. Proposals for a company were included in the 2021 Welsh Labour–Plaid Cymru agreement, between the Welsh Government and Plaid Cymru. In October 2022, the Welsh Government announced it would make efforts to establish the company, as part of the co-operation agreement.

Ynni Cymru is to be based in M-SParc, Anglesey. The full role of the company has not been decided as of 2023, in particular, whether the company would hold stakes in its funded projects. The main aim of the company is to support investment in community-owned renewable energy generation in Wales. Grants on behalf of the company have already been awarded by the Welsh Government to eleven projects, which were collectively awarded £750,000. In its 2023 annual government budget, the Welsh Government earmarked £2.47 million for the company, as well as an additional £10 million to spend on infrastructure. The company hopes to hire its first nine energy-specialised staff, increasing to twelve shortly after. Payments from the company, over the next three years, would be in the form of grants. On 7 August 2023, the company was publicly announced and launched and efforts were underway to fully establish the company.

On launch, the Welsh Conservative Shadow Climate Minister Janet Finch-Saunders welcomed the proposal, but also urged restrictions be lifted on private individuals developing local hydro power on their land. While Siân Gwenllian, a Plaid Cymru MS working with the Welsh Government under the Plaid co-operation deal, stated more community projects were needed to be under the company's remit.

== Projects ==
In 2023, some projects were announced to be connected to the programme/company:

- Bethesda, Dyffryn Ogwen (Ogwen Valley) – Community and business building solar scheme
- Tanygrisiau – heat project with Community Energy Wales
- Cwm Arian's Heart of Dyfed Power Unlocker project in Carmarthenshire, Ceredigion and Pembrokeshire
- Bretton Hall, Flintshire – Solar project with Ynni Newydd Cyfyngedig

== See also ==
- Cardiff Bay Barrage
- Trydan Gwyrdd Cymru
- GB Energy
- Cwm Dyli
- Dinorwig Power Station
- Dolgarrog power station
- Gwynt y Môr
- Maentwrog power station
- Rhyl Flats
- Swansea Barrage
- Tidal Lagoon Swansea Bay
