= Awel y Môr =

Proposed offshore wind farm in north Wales

Awel y Môr Offshore Wind Farm
- Official name: Awel y Môr Fferm Wynt Alltraeth
- Country: Wales, United Kingdom
- Coordinates: 53.491°N 3.611°W
- Status: Proposed
- Commission date: Expected 2030/2031
- Owner: RWE

Wind farm
- Type: Offshore
- Site area: 78 km^{2} (30 sq mi)

Power generation
- Nameplate capacity: 775 MW (proposed)

External links
- Website: https://awelymor.cymru/

Awel y Môr is a proposed offshore wind farm located off the coast of north Wales, to the west of Gwynt y Môr. It will be located about 10 km (6.2 mi; 5.4 nmi) north of Rhyl, Denbighshire. It is expected to have between 34 and 50 turbines, with a maximum height of 331 m (1,086 ft), although the design is yet to be finalised.

The project is being developed by RWE, in conjunction with SWM and Siemens Financial Services. It is claimed by the developer that the project could create up to 2000 jobs during the construction phase.

In January 2026, the project was awarded Contracts for Difference for 775 MW at £91.20/MWh (2024 prices), as part of the seventh Allocation Round. This will be the first offshore wind farm built in Wales for 10 years.

== Development, planning and consenting ==
In August 2020, RWE Renewables submitted a scoping report for the project, proposing to build around another 100 turbines next to the Gwynt y Môr wind farm. Combined the two projects were slated to be "one of the biggest offshore wind farms in the world".

In 2021, following public consultation, the project was scaled back to between 35 and 50 turbines, due to concerns about the visual impact. Council officers gave four reasons to object to the scheme:

1. Significant detriment to the seascape character and coastal views, from both the scale of individual turbines, and the extent of the project as a whole.
2. Impact on tourism and recreation, give Llandudno's reputation as a 'traditional' resort.
3. Detriment to heritage assets in Conwy, including the Llandudno Conservation Area and Llandudno Pier.
4. Lack mitigation against adverse impact from construction.

On 20 June 2022, an application to Natural Resources Wales for a marine licence for the wind farm. This was granted on 15 November 2023.

In September 2023, consent for the project was granted by Claire Coutinho, the Secretary of State for Energy Security and Net Zero.

In May 2025, Awel y Môr was one of seven projects where the Crown Estate increased the lease capacity, to maximise the potential from existing sites.

== See also ==
- List of offshore wind farms in the United Kingdom
- Renewable energy in the United Kingdom
- Renewable energy in Wales
