= Cynog =

Cynog is a Welsh male given name. In Old Welsh, it was pronounced and written as Kynauc, Kennauc, and in other ways.

It may refer to:

- Saint Cynog ap Brychan (5th century), Welsh martyred prince
  - Merthyr Cynog, a hamlet in Powys named for the saint
  - Parc Cynog, a wind farm named for the saint
  - Various churches dedicated to the saint (Welsh: Llangynog)
  - Llangynog, Carmarthenshire, a community named for its church
- Cynog (bishop) (late 6th century), the second bishop of Meneva (modern St David's)
- Cynog Dafis (born 1938), Welsh Plaid Cymru politician
