= Climate change in Wales =

Climate change affects various industries and environments in Wales including agriculture.

== Greenhouse gas emissions ==
=== Sources ===
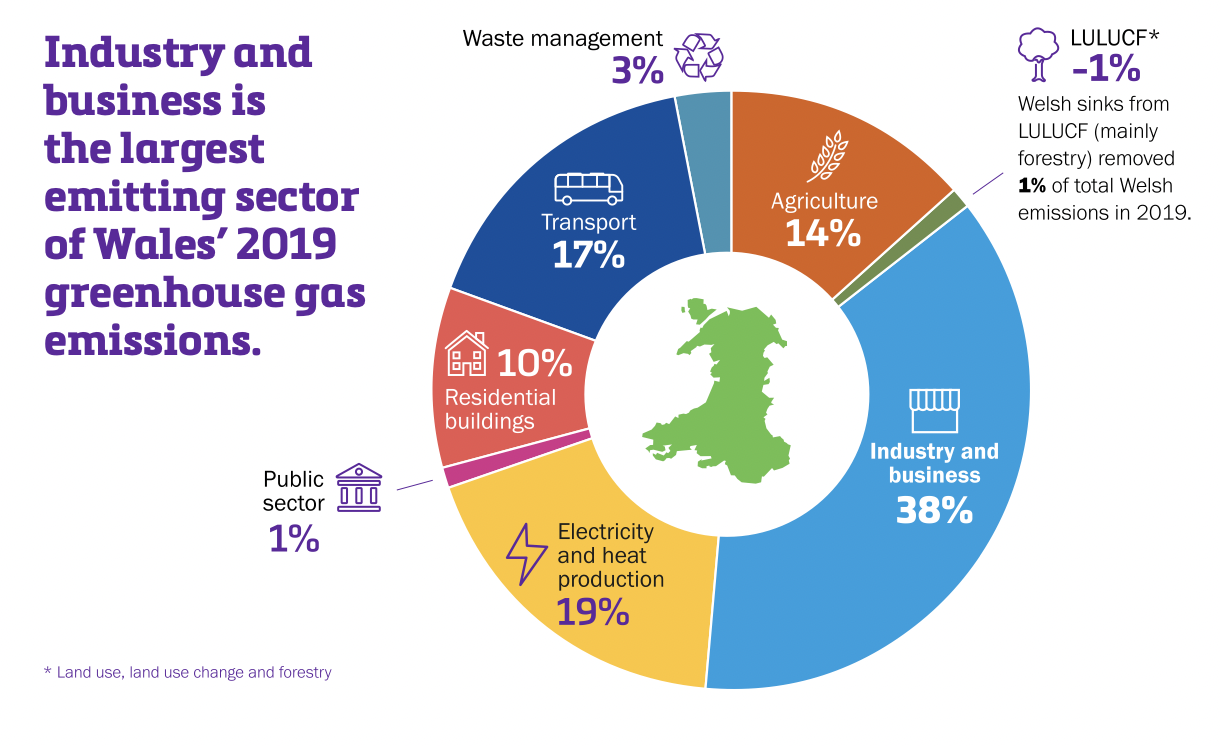

- Energy supply is the largest source
- 14% agriculture, including the contribution of 8.9 million sheep and 414,000 cows

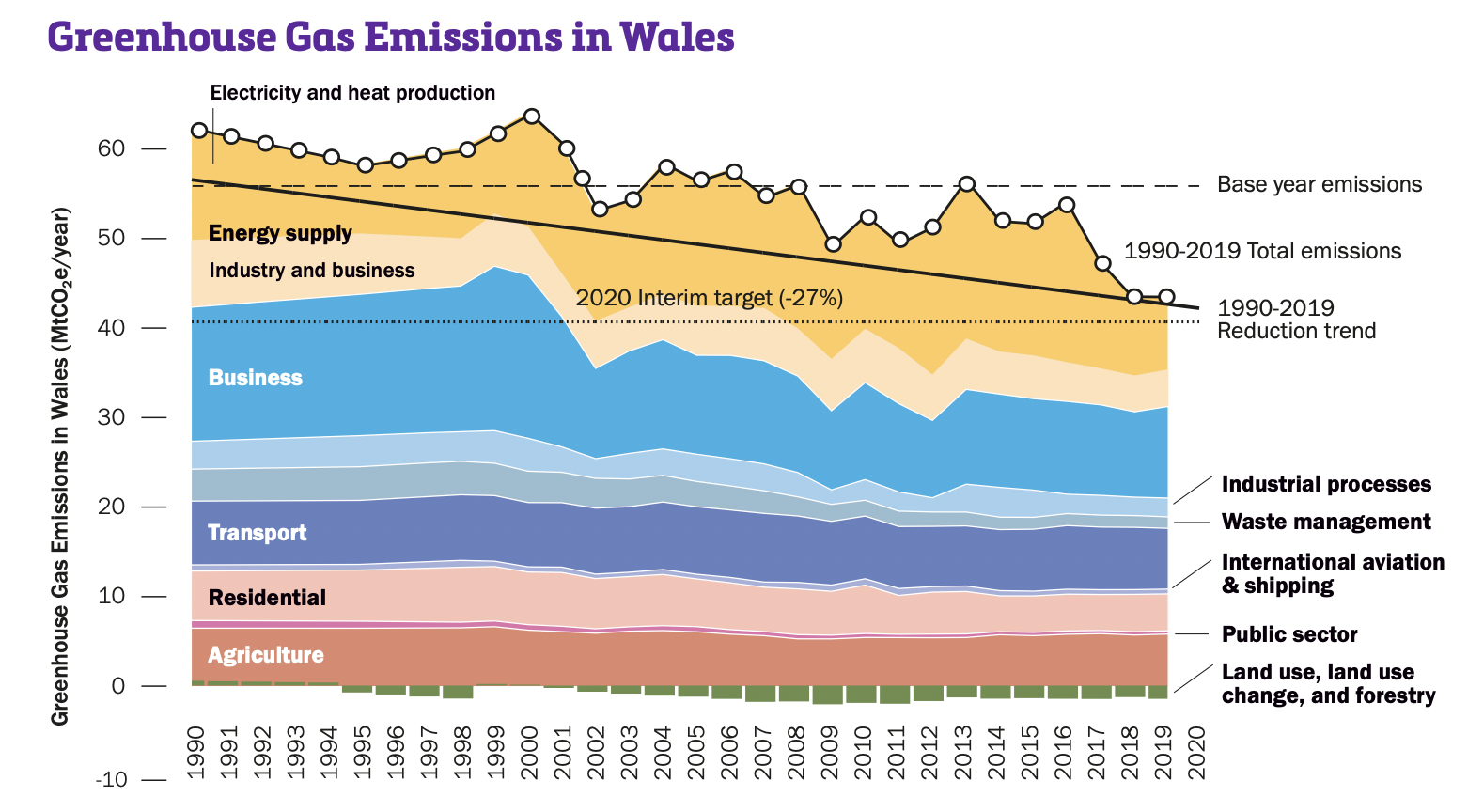

- Cars alone are responsible for 60% of the transport emission. A move to hybrid and electric may reduce emissions.
- Iron and steel industries in Wales contribute 60% of business emissions

=== Trends ===
Emissions are reducing in Wales. After 2016, shutting the last coal-fired power station in Wales contributed "toward half" of the fall in emissions in 2016. Over the last 30 years, there has been a 31% cut in emissions. The goal for 2030 is to have reached a 63% reduction, and by 2050 to reach net-zero carbon emission. These aims are a significant challenge.

=== Welsh Government Targets ===
- 2021–2025: average 37% reduction
- 2026–2030: average 58% reduction
- 2030: 63% reduction
- 2040: 89%
- 2050: at least net zero

== Impacts of climate change ==
Llanrwst floods in 2015.

Climate change is a factor during the assessment for future developments in Wales since December 2021. Wales is the first country in the UK where developers must consider future flood risk due or coastal erosion due to global warming. 11.3% of land in Wales will be at risk from flooding in the future, up from 9.86% as previously projected.

== Responses ==
=== Policies ===
The Welsh Government owns a company, Ynni Cymru, which funds community energy projects. The Welsh Government owns a company, Trydan Gwyrdd Cymru to develop state-owned energy - specifically offshore wind. Trydan Gwyrdd Cymru has been suggested as a model for Great British Energy.

The electric furnace at the Tata Steel plant is to be replaced with an electric arc furnace.

In 2023, the Welsh Government cancelled several road building projects due to the emissions rise that would have resulted from the consequential increase in car usage.

=== Legislation ===
The Environment (Wales) Act 2016 required the Welsh Government to set reduced emission targets by the end of 2018.

=== Public opinions ===
In March 2025, a wildfire near Treorchy in Rhondda Cynon Taf brought renewed public concern about climate change and its potential to worsen fire risks in Wales. Homeowners Alison and Ian Jones, whose property was threatened, expressed fears about future wildfire severity. Their experience reflected wider anxiety, especially as similar fires occurred across Wales that month. Professor Stefan Doerr of Swansea University's Centre for Wildfire Research noted that milder winters and spring droughts were contributing to longer and more intense fire seasons.
