= List of offshore wind farms in the Irish Sea =

This is a complete list of operational, offshore wind farms in the Irish Sea and connected areas such as the Celtic Sea and North Channel.

This information is gathered from multiple Internet sources, and primarily the 4C Offshore's Global Offshore Wind Farm Map and Database and is current up to February 2015. The name of the Wind Farm is the name used by the Energy Company when referring to the Farm and is usually related to a shoal or the name of the nearest town on shore. The Wind Farm part is implied and hence removed for clarity.

The list is sorted by capacity, but it can be sorted in any way by clicking the symbol >< at the top in each column.

Wind farm	Country	Location	Cap. (MW)	Turbines	Commissioned	Build Cost	Cap. fac.	Depth range (ft)	mi to shore	Owner	Refs.
Gwynt y Môr	United Kingdom	53°27′00″N 3°35′00″W	576	160 Siemens SWP 3.6-107	2015	€2,700 million		40-90	10	RWE npower, Stadtwerke München, Siemens	(Note: Gwynt y Môr)
West of Duddon Sands	United Kingdom	53°59′00″N 3°28′00″W	389	108 Siemens SWP 3.6-120	2014	£1,600 million		56-78	9	Ørsted, SSE	(Note: West of Duddon Sands)
Walney	United Kingdom	54°03′00″N 3°31′00″W	1029	102 Siemens SWP 3.6-107 and 40 MHI Vestas 8.25MW (likely V164 model based variants) with 47 Siemens-Gamesa SWT-7.0-154 turbines.	2010	£1,200 million		60-100	8.5	Ørsted, SSE, OPW	(Note: Walney Offshore Windfarm)
Robin Rigg	United Kingdom	54°45′00″N 3°43′00″W	180	60 × Vestas V90-3.0MW	2010	£396 million		0-40	7	E.ON	(Note: Robin Rigg)
Ormonde	United Kingdom	54°06′00″N 3°24′00″W	150	30 × REpower 5MW	2012	£552 million		55-70	9.5	Vattenfall	(Note: Ormonde, Irish Sea)
Barrow	United Kingdom	53°59′00″N 3°17′00″W	90	30 × Vestas V90-3.0MW	2006	£123 million		50-65	4	Ørsted	(Note: Barrow Offshore Wind Farm)
Burbo Bank	United Kingdom	53°29′00″N 3°11′00″W	90	25 × Siemens SWP 3.6-107	2007	£90 million	32-35%	0-20	4.3	Ørsted	(Note: Burbo Bank)^{p95}
Rhyl Flats	United Kingdom	53°22′00″N 3°39′00″W	90	25 × Siemens SWP 3.6-107	2009	£198 million		13-50	5	RWE	(Note: Rhyl Flats)
North Hoyle	United Kingdom	53°26′00″N 3°24′00″W	60	30 × Vestas V80-2MW	2003	£80 million	33-36%	16-40	4.3	RWE	(Note: North Hoyle)^{p43}
Arklow Bank	Ireland	52°47′20″N 5°56′56″W	25	7 × GE Wind Energy 3.6MW	2004			6-16	6.2	SSE Airtricity	(Note: No official website available as of 2015.)
"Cap." is the rated nameplate capacity of the wind farm; "When" is the year when the windfarm was or will be commissioned and put into service.; "Cost" is the total capital cost of the project up to commissioning.; "Cap. Fac." is the average capacity factor, i.e. the average power generated by the windfarm, as a percentage of its nameplate capacity.; "mi to shore" is the average distance of the windfarm to shore, or (where available) the distance from the in-farm transformer/substation to the shore; "Depth range (ft)" is the range of minimum to maximum depths of water that the windfarm is sited in; "Refs" cite the source references for the information. The [w ...] footnotes link to each windfarm's own home page

== See also ==
- Wind power in Europe
- List of wind farms
- List of offshore wind farms
- Lists of offshore wind farms by country
- Lists of offshore wind farms by water area
- List of offshore wind farms in the United Kingdom
