= Greencoat UK Wind =

British investment company

Greencoat UK Wind plc
- Traded as: LSE: UKW; FTSE 250 component
- Industry: Investment trust
- Headquarters: London, England, UK
- Website: www.greencoat-ukwind.com

Greencoat UK Wind is a British investment company based in London investing in UK wind farms. Established in 2012, it is listed on the London Stock Exchange and is a constituent of the FTSE 250 Index. The company's Chairman is Tim Ingram. Greencoat Capital LLP acts as investment manager to Greencoat UK Wind plc.

== Operations ==
As of April 2024, the company oversees 49 wind farms in the UK, with over half of them under its sole ownership. It holds a stake in the Hornsea One Wind Farm, which is located 75 miles into the North Sea. Greencoat’s combined portfolio generates around 1.5 per cent of UK domestic electricity demand.

Assets of Greencoat UK Wind
Property	Capacity (MW)	Type	Location	Stake	Invested	Divested
Bicker Fen	26.7	Onshore	England (Lincolnshire)	80%	2017	
Bin Mountain	9	Onshore	Northern Ireland	100%	2013	
Bishopthorpe	16.4	Onshore	England (Lincolnshire)	67.4%	2017 (100%)	2025 (32.6%)
Braes of Doune Wind Farm	72	Onshore	Scotland (Stirlingshire)	100%	2013 (50%); 2021 (50%)	
Brockaghboy	47.5	Onshore	Northern Ireland	100%	2018	
Burbo Bank Extension	258	Offshore	Irish Sea (Merseyside)	15.7%	2021	
Carcant	6	Onshore	Scotland (Borders)	100%	2013	
Church Hill	18.4	Onshore	Northern Ireland	100%	2018	
Clyde Wind Farm	522	Onshore	Scotland (South Lanarkshire)	28.2	2016; 2017	
Corriegarth	69.5	Onshore	Scotland (Inverness)	100%	2017	
Cotton Farm	16.4	Onshore	England (Cambridgeshire)	100%	2013	
Crighshane	32.2	Onshore	Northern Ireland	100%	2018	
Dalquhandy	42	Onshore	Scotland (South Lanarkshire)	60%	2023 (100%)	2024 (40%)
Deeping St Nicholas	16.4	Onshore	England (Lincolnshire)	80%	2017	
Douglas West	45	Onshore	Scotland (South Lanarkshire)	60%	2021 (100%)	2024 (40%)
Drone Hill	28.6	Onshore	Scotland (Borders)	51.6	2014	
Dunmaglass	94	Onshore	Scotland (Inverness)	35.5%	2019	
Earls Hall Farm	10.25	Onshore	England (Essex)	100%	2013	
Glass Moor	16.4	Onshore	England (Cambridgeshire)	80%	2017	
Glen Kyllachy	48.5	Onshore	Scotland (Inverness)	100%	2022	
Hornsea 1	1,200	Offshore	North Sea (Yorkshore)	11.5	2022 (12.5%)	2025 (1%)
Humber Gateway Wind Farm	219	Offshore	North Sea (Yorkshire)	49	2020	
Kildrummy	18.4	Onshore	Scotland (Aberdeenshire)	100%	2014	
Kype Muir Extension	67.2	Onshore	Scotland (South Lanarkshire)	65%	2023 (49.9%); 2024 (15.1%)	
Langhope Rig	16	Onshore	Scotland (Borders)	100%	2017	
Lindhurst	9	Onshore	England (Nottinghamshire)	49%	2013	
Little Cheyne Court Wind Farm	59.8	Onshore	England (Kent)	41%	2013	
London Array	630	Offshore	North Sea (Kent)	13.7%	2023	
Maerdy	24	Onshore	Wales (Glamorgan)	100%	2013	
Middlemoor	54	Onshore	Scotland (Borders)	49%	2013	
North Hoyle Offshore Wind Farm	60	Offshore	Irish Sea (Clwyd)	100%	2017	
North Rhins	22	Onshore	Scotland (Dumfries & Galloway)	51.6	2014	
Red House	12.3	Onshore	England (Lincolnshire)	80%	2017	
Red Tile	24.6	Onshore	England (Cambridgeshire)	80%	2017	
Rhyl Flats	90	Offshore	Irish Sea (Clwyd)	24.95%	2013	
Screggagh	20	Onshore	Northern Ireland	100%	2016	
Sixpenny Wood	20.5	Onshore	England (Yorkshire)	51.6	2014	
Slieve Divena 1 & 2	48.8	Onshore	Northern Ireland	100%	2020	
South Kyle	240	Onshore	Scotland (Dumfries & Galloway)	100%	2023	
Stronelairg	227.7	Onshore	Scotland	35.5%	2019	
Stroupster	29.9	Onshore	Scotland (Caithness)	100%	2015	
Tappaghan	28.5	Onshore	Northern Ireland	100%	2013	
Tom nan Clach	39.1	Onshore	Scotland (Nairn)	75%	2019	
Twentyshilling	37.8	Onshore	Scotland (Dumfries & Galloway)	100%	2021	
Walney Wind Farm	367.2	Offshore	Irish Sea (Cumbria)	25.1%	2020	
Windy Rigg	43.2	Onshore	Scotland (Dumfries & Galloway)	100%	2021	
Yelvertoft	16.5	Onshore	England (Northamptonshire)	51.6	2014	
