= Environment Wales =

Environment Wales is a partnership of voluntary organisations in Wales, whose aim it is to contribute to sustainable development, mainly by awarding grants for projects which contribute to this aim.

The organisations are:

- Cylch - Wales Community Recycling Network
- BTCV Cymru
- Groundwork Wales
- Keep Wales Tidy
- The National Trust in Wales
- Wales Council for Voluntary Action
- West Wales Eco Centre
- Wildlife Trusts Wales

== See also ==
- Environmental issues in Wales
- Renewable energy in Wales
- Wales Green Party
