= Renewable energy in Wales =

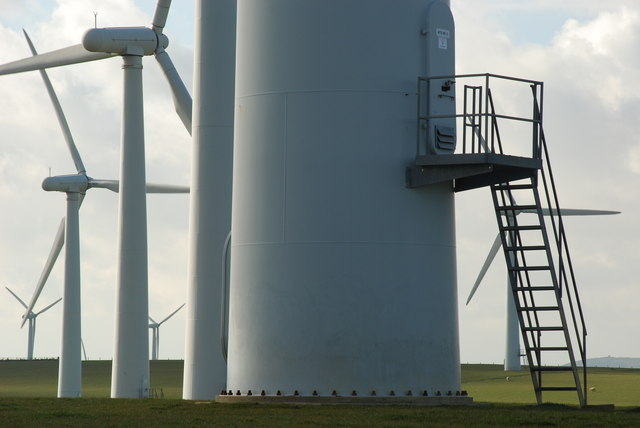
Wind farm at Llanbabo, Anglesey

In 2019, Wales generated 27% of its electricity consumption as renewable electricity, an increase from 19% in 2014. The Welsh Government set a target of 70% by 2030. In 2019, Wales was a net exporter of electricity. It produced 27.9 TWh of electricity while only consuming 14.7 TWh. The natural resource base for renewable energy is high by European standards, with the core sources being wind, wave, and tidal. Wales has a long history of renewable energy: in the 1880s, the first house in Wales with electric lighting powered from its own hydro-electric power station was in Plas Tan y Bwlch, Gwynedd. In 1963, the Ffestiniog Power Station was constructed, providing a large scale generation of hydroelectricity, and in November 1973, the Centre for Alternative Technology was opened in Machynlleth.

== Politics ==
In April 2019, a Climate Emergency was declared by the Welsh Government, and on 1 May the Senedd became the first parliament in the world to pass a climate emergency declaration.

Current Welsh Government policy advocates for an increase in the percentage that renewable energy accounts for in Wales' energy sector, launching projects such as 'Prosperity for All: A Low Carbon Wales' to achieve this goal. 'The Climate Change Strategy for Wales' describes how the government will decrease greenhouse gas emissions. The reports suggest that energy generation from renewable sources is key to achieving a low carbon economy.

The Welsh Government expects that all new energy projects should have an element of local ownership and this was the case for 825 MW of installed renewable energy capacity in 2019.

In 2016, the low carbon economy was estimated to consist of 9,000 businesses, employing 13,000 people and generating a £2.4 billion turnover.

Reform UK's 2026 Senedd election manifesto proposed banning new onshore wind and solar farms.

== By principal area ==
Percentage of electricity consumption which from local renewables in 2019 (5 highest):

- Ceredigion: 110%
- Denbighshire: 100%
- Powys: 91%
- Rhondda Cynon Taf: 66%
- Neath Port Talbot: 65%

== Hydropower ==
=== List of hydropower stations ===
List of active hydropower stations in order of energy output:

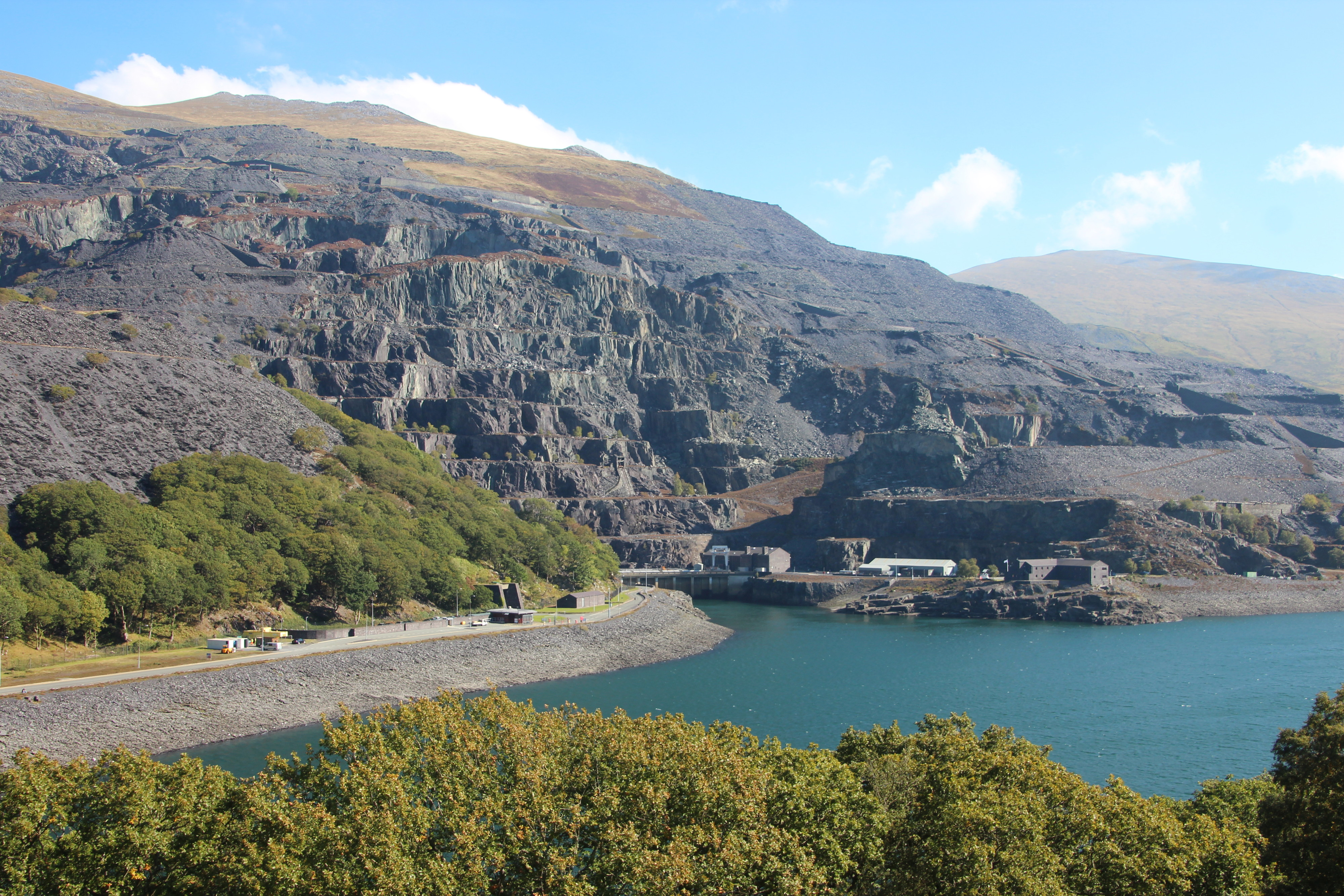
Dinorwig Power Station

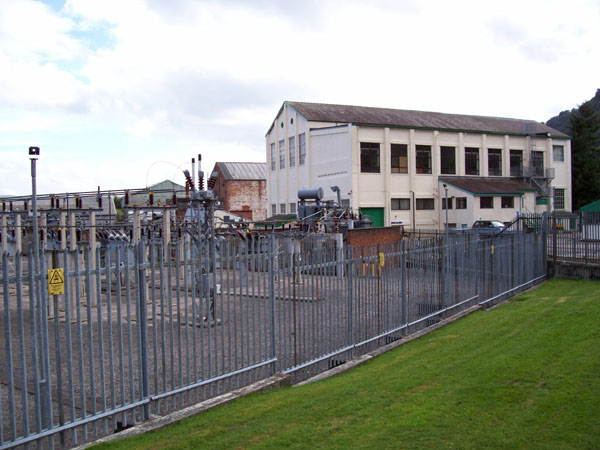
Dolgarrog Hydroelectric power station

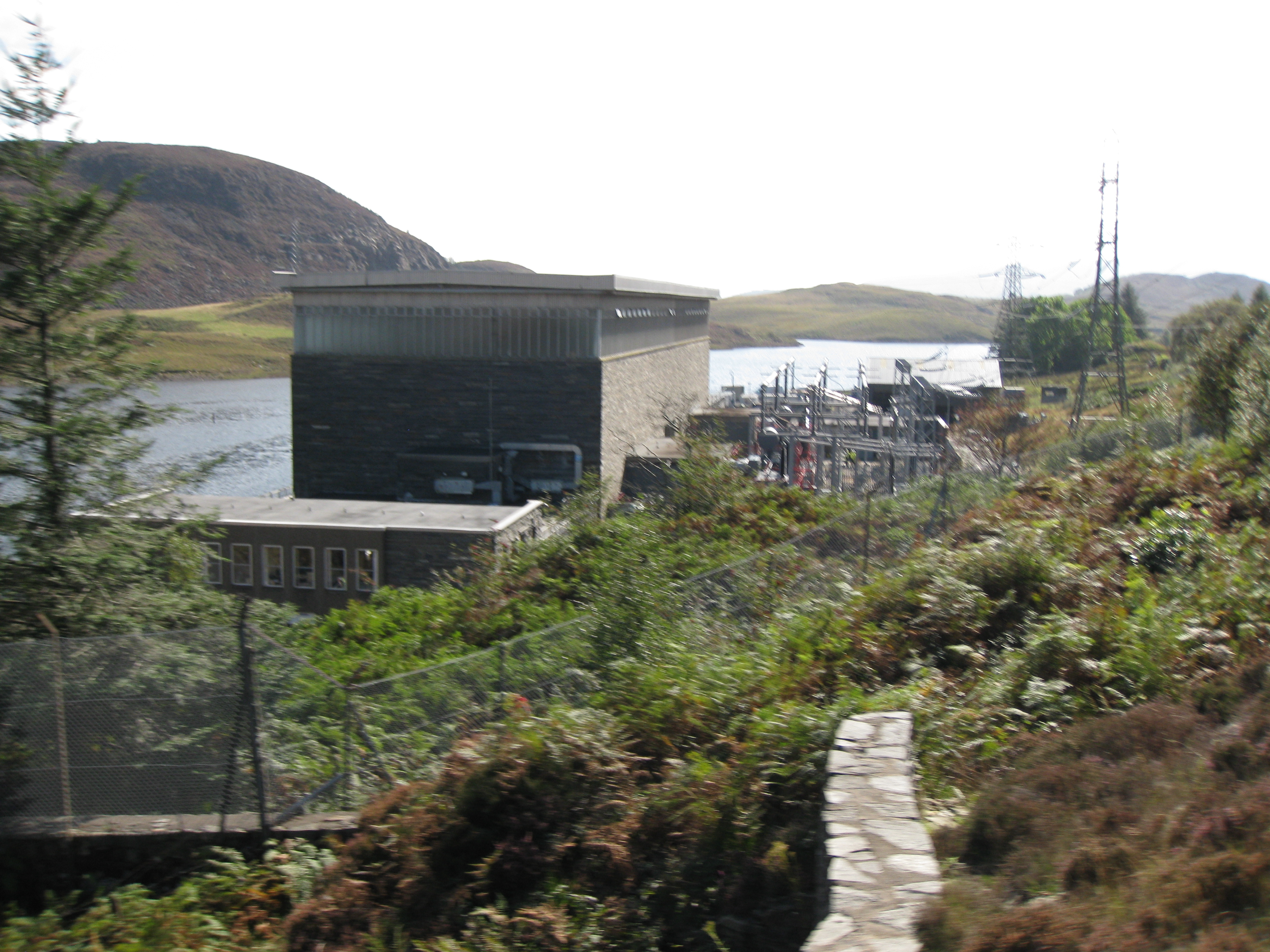
Ffestiniog Hydroelectric power station

Name	Location	Coordinates	Output (MW)	Notes
Dinorwig Power Station	Gwynedd	53°7′7″N 4°6′50″W	1728	(pumped storage)
Ffestiniog Power Station	Gwynedd	52°58′51″N 3°58′8″W	360	(pumped storage)
Rheidol Power Station	Ceredigion	52°23′46″N 3°54′00″W	49	
Maentwrog power station	Gwynedd	52°56'10"N 4°00'15"W	30	commissioned 1928, refitted 1988-92
Dolgarrog power station	Conwy County Borough	53°11'28"N 3°50'33"W	28	commissioned 1907 operational 2020
Cwm Dyli hydro power station	Gwynedd		10	commissioned 1906 operational
Radyr Hydro Scheme	Cardiff	51°31'9.79"N 3°15'13.50"W	0.394	Hydro (River Weir Screw turbines)
River Tawe Barrage	Swansea	51°36′58″N 3°55′44″W	0.2	

In 2019, there were 363 hydroelectric projects in Wales, with the capacity of 182MW, annually generating over 347 GWh. Since 2014 Natural Resources Wales (NRW) have enabled developers and small community groups to build 15 small scale hydro schemes in Wales, which can produce 1300kW of energy annually. NRW have also finished building the 17kW Garwnant small scale hydro scheme in 2017.

Dinorwig Power Station, which lies on the boundary of the Snowdonia National Park, was fully commissioned in 1984. It has six generators placed inside Europe's largest man-made cavern, deep inside the Elidir mountain. Maximum electricity generation is achieved in less than 16 seconds, and is the largest quick response hydropower plant in Europe. The scheme supplies a maximum power of 1,728-megawatt (2,317,000 hp) and has a storage capacity of approximately 9.1 GWh (33 TJ).

The Rheidol hydropower plant is the largest hydropowerplant of its kind in Wales. It has generated renewable energy since 1962, using rainfall from the nearby mountains. The plant includes a combination of reservoirs, dams, pipelines, aqueducts and power stations, over 162 square kilometres producing around 85 GWh annually which can power around 12,350 homes. The Ffestiniog power station opened in Gwynedd in 1963 and produces 360 MW.

== Tidal power ==
Wales has a vast untapped potential for tidal power. Gerallt Llewelyn Jones of social enterprise Menter Môn said, “We have strong tidal resources around Wales and they have huge potential.” He added that tidal power is more predictable than wind and solar power. The tidal range round the west coast of Britain is one of the largest in the world.

In January 2025, Huw Irranca-Davies the introduction of Strategic Resource Areas for tidal stream energy. These indicate areas in marine spatial planning where particular sectors may have priority. Four areas have been designated for tidal stream energy: north and west of Anglesey; around Ynys Enlli and the Llŷn peninsula; north-west of St Davids Head, Pembrokeshire; and off the coast of South Wales, south-west of Cardiff.

=== Swansea tidal lagoon ===
In 2015 the idea was raised the UK government to fund a £1 billion development of a sea wall around Swansea Bay to harness the power of the tide. The power generated could provide energy for 120,000 homes for 120 years. Other sites mooted were Cardiff Bay, Newport and Colwyn Bay. In June 2018 the UK government abandoned their support for the scheme, saying other forms of energy generation were cheaper. The decision was condemned by the green energy industry, environmental groups, the Labour Party and Plaid Cymru.

In January 2023, plans of a new Swansea tidal lagoon project called "Blue Eden" emerged but this time the multi-billion pound project would be fully funded by the private sector. Phase SA1 of the project is said to include an electric battery manufacturing plant, battery storage facility, a tidal lagoon in Swansea Bay with a floating solar farm, data storage centre, a green hydrogen production facility, an oceanic and climate change research centre, and hundreds of waterfront homes. Claimed it would be a worldwide first, the project could start within 18 months but would take more than a decade to complete.

=== North Wales Tidal Lagoon ===
The North Wales Tidal Lagoon project is a proposal to build lagoons with large sea walls and turbines powered by rising and falling tides, it could power 180,000 homes. The proposed North Wales Tidal Lagoon would involve a sea wall over 19 miles (31 km) long from Llandudno to Prestatyn. Supporters say the £7bn project could power more than over a million homes and create more than 20,000 jobs. Denbighshire County Council unanimously voted to back the scheme in February 2023, claiming it would support 5000 construction jobs.

=== Morlais tidal stream ===
The Morlais tidal stream project is set to cover 35km^{2} of the Irish Sea on the west coast of Anglesey (Ynys Môn). It is hoped that investors and developers will build early-scale tidal energy projects which could deliver a combined 120MW of renewable clean energy. In 2022, £31million was secured for the first phase of construction from the EU's European Regional Development fund via the Welsh Government, which is likely to be the last large grant Wales receives from the EU. Jones Bros Civil Engineering has been given a £23.5m contract to build onshore infrastructure and Magallanes Tidal Energy has secured a guaranteed price for the energy it produces. The Government has agreed a £178.54 per MWh price via the Contracts for Difference (CfD) scheme.

== Wind power ==
Name	Location	Coordinates	Output	Notes
Alltwalis Wind Farm	Carmarthenshire	51°58′24″N 4°15′3″W	23 MW	
Brechfa Forest Wind Farm	Gwernogle, Carmarthenshire		90 MW	
Carno wind farm	Carno, Powys, Mid Wales	52°33′1″N 3°36′1″W	49 MW	
Cefn Croes wind farm	Ceredigion	52°24′18″N 3°45′03″W	58.5 MW	
Moel Maelogen	Conwy	53°08′07″N 3°43′25″W	14.3 MW	
North Hoyle Offshore Wind Farm	Liverpool Bay	53°26′N 3°24′W	60 MW	
Pen y Cymoedd	Neath	51°41′01″N 03°41′01″W	228 MW	
Rhyd-y-Groes	Anglesey		7 MW	
Rhyl Flats	Liverpool Bay	53°22′N 03°39′W	90 MW	
Gwynt y Môr	Irish Sea	53°27′N 03°35′W	576 MW	(consent granted 2008, construction began 2011)

=== Offshore wind ===
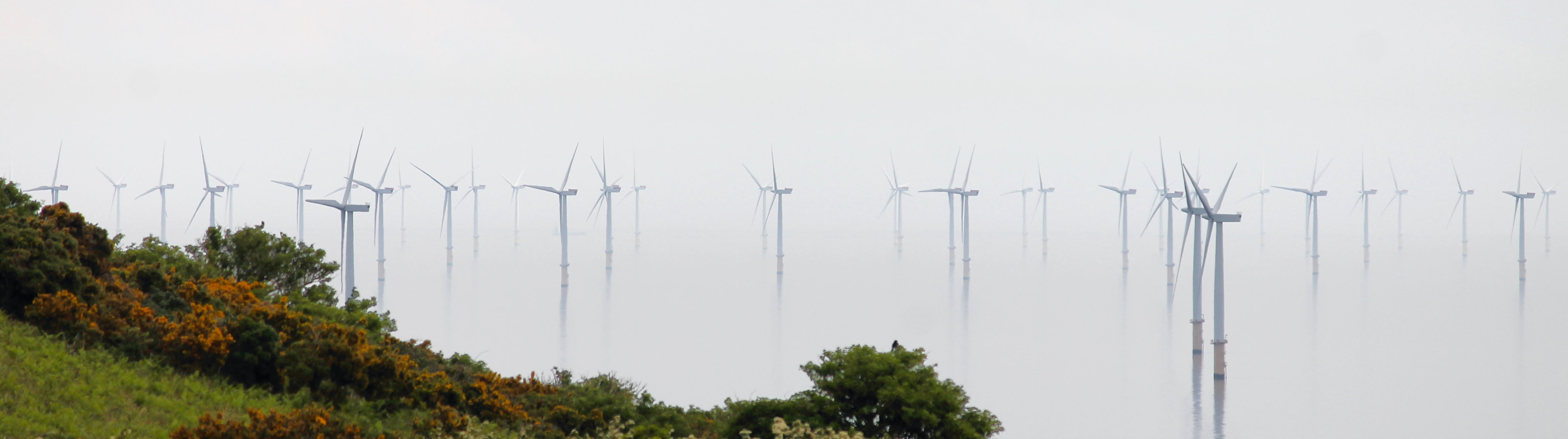
Gwynt y Môr windfarm, the fifth largest operating offshore windfarm in the world

In 2021, three offshore wind farms off the north coast had a capacity of 726 MW: Rhyl Flats and North Hoyle have a capacity of 150 MW, and Gwynt y Môr was commissioned in 2015 and in 2019 had a capacity of 576 MW with 160 turbines, making it the fifth largest operating offshore windfarm in the world.

Blue Gem Wind, a joint venture between TotalEnergies and Simply Blue Energy, is a Celtic Sea project developer that has secured rights to develop Wales’ first floating offshore wind farm, located 45 km south of the Pembrokeshire Coast. This will be Wales' first floating wind farm and could start generating electricity by 2027.

=== Onshore wind ===
One of the main problems facing developers in Wales are peat bogs, a naturally occurring carbon sink. Ornithological issues, especially in ecologically rich sites can also increase developing costs. Some of the main terrestrial wind energy farms include:

- Brechfa Forest West (up to 28 turbines, 57.4MW) - ‘Renewable Energy Project of the Year’ winner
- Clocaenog Forest, Denbighshire (27 turbines, 96MW),
- Llandinam Windfarm, Powys (103 turbines, 31MW) - the oldest ScottishPower Renewables' windfarm, operated as CeltPower Ltd. Constructed in 1992.
- Pen y Cymoedd (76 turbine, 228MW) - Wales's largest onshore wind farm; a battery storage scheme will also be built onsite.

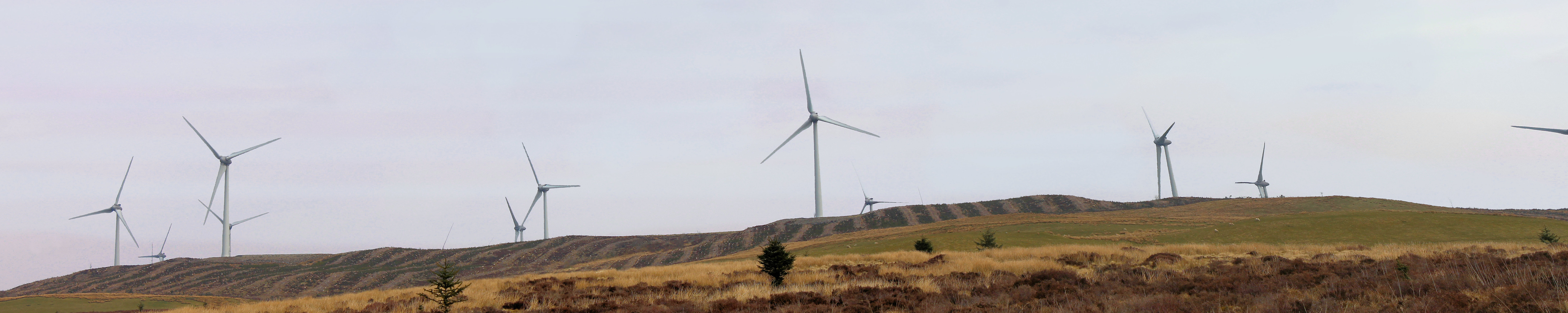
Clocaenog Forest wind farm, from Llyn Brenig

In 2019, the capacity was 1.25 GW, according to the Welsh Government, which was an increase of 12% from the previous year. Neath Port Talbot, with its 230 MW capacity in 2019 was the highest in Wales. Onshore wind is relatively strong in Wales, due to its mountainous and coastal nature.

== Solar PV ==
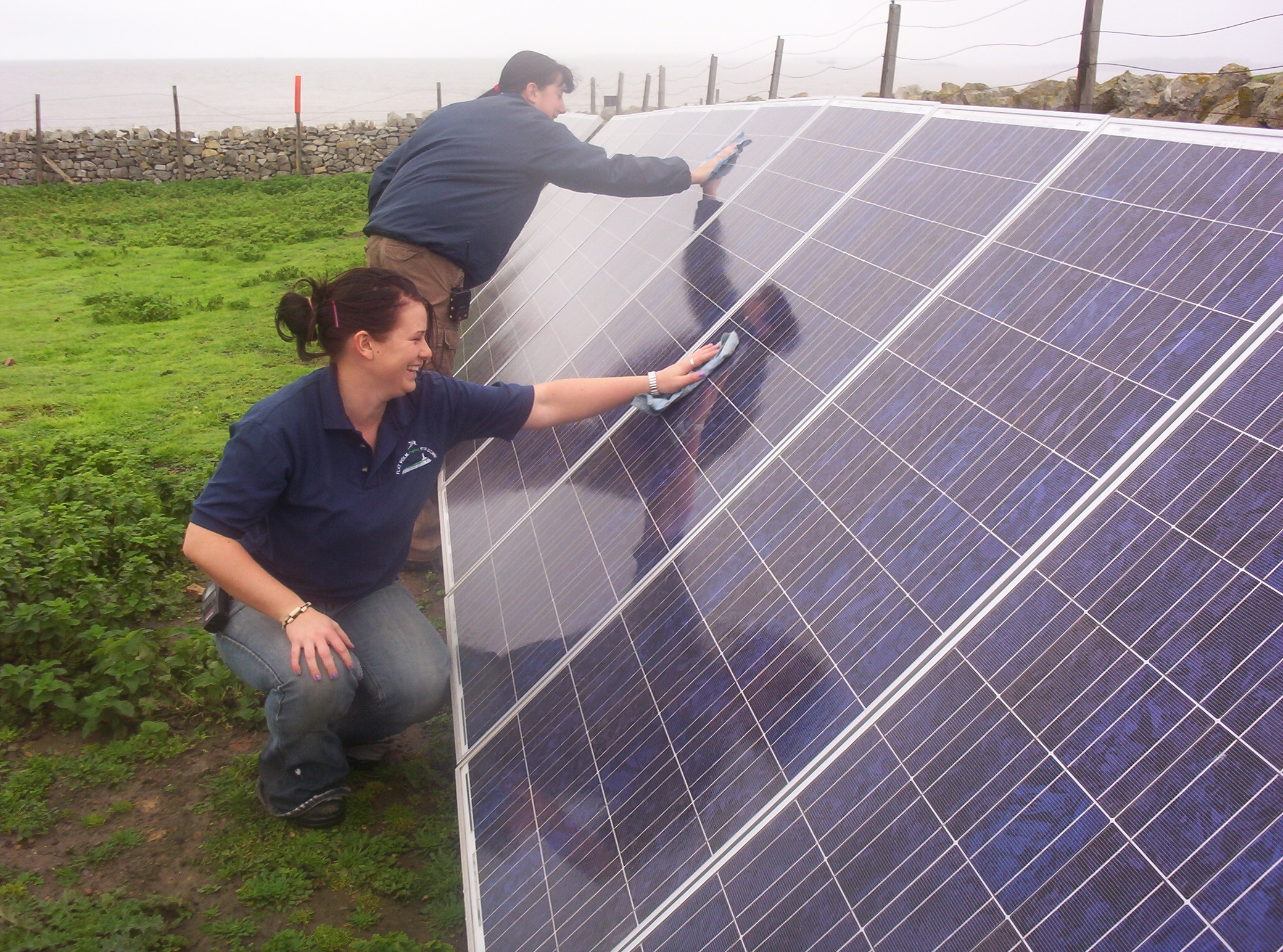
Installing solar panels in Flat Holm

Solar PV (for electricity) and thermal panels (for hot water) are used throughout the country, for both domestic and non-domestic use. From 2012, roof-mounted solar panels above 50 kW needed full planning permission; anything below that fell under 'permitted rights'.

Nearly 20% of Wales' total solar power (989 MW) is generated in Pembrokeshire. In 2019, 26% of the national, total capacity solar PV in Wales was locally owned.

Welsh ministers have approved a 32MW solar farm project near Abergavenny and construction is expected to start in 2024.

== Heat pumps ==
In 2019, the total capacity from water, air and ground source heat pumps totalled 86 MW, from 7,817 projects. Most of these were domestic installations, and around 80% were air source heat pumps.

== See also ==
National

- Energy in Wales
- Sophie Howe
- Wales Green Party
- Ynni Cymru

Global

- Renewable energy in Scotland
- World energy consumption
- List of energy storage projects
- List of renewable energy topics by country
- Renewable energy development
- Hydrogen economy
- Renewable energy by country
