= Land use in Wales =

Overview of land management in Wales

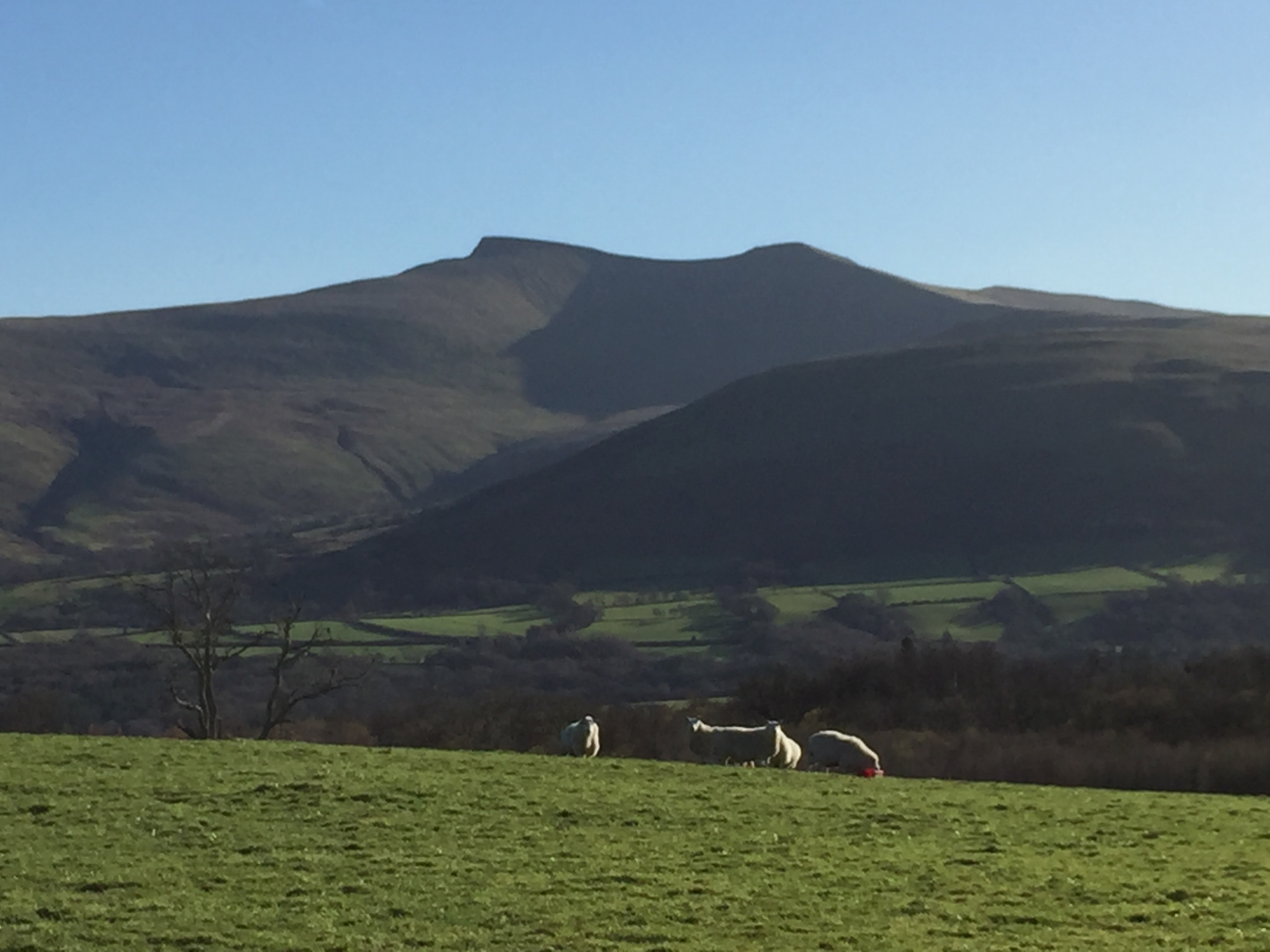
Pasture and mountain land in the Brecon Beacons

Wales has a surface area of 2,628,779 km^{2} or 2,077,900 ha. It has a border with England to the east, and is bounded by the Irish Sea to the north and west, and by the Bristol Channel to the south. It has an oceanic temperate climate which is markedly influenced by the North Atlantic Current carrying warm water from tropical latitudes. As a result, it has a much milder climate than most places in the world at similar latitudes. Altitudes range from sea-level to 10985 m on the Snowdon Massif.

The ways in which land is used in Wales reflect conditions of climate, geology and topography, modified by long traditions of land management. Sheep-grazed pasture predominates in all of the lowland zone, with arable fields mainly confined to the east of the country, although specialised early potato enterprises are favoured by the mild climate of the western peninsulas of Llŷn and Pembrokeshire. Some parts, like the Vale of Tywi and the coastal plain of Ceredigion are famed for dairy farming, as the combinations of soils and climate mean that good quality grass can be reliably grown. In contrast, many more elevated parts of the Welsh land are of limited use for agriculture, and extensive upland conifer forests were planted in the years following the two world wars. Wild habitats occupy steep land and other areas that are less profitable for commercial use, such as wetlands, moorlands and mountainous terrain. Compared with many countries, wild habitats are scattered and inextensive, but they include significant cliff, dune and other coastal habitats; increasingly rare species-rich pastures and meadows, and wet semi-natural pastures known as rhos in relatively lowland situations. Ffridd grasslands are areas of open, moderately or lightly grazed often minimally managed pastures on the partially enclosed slopes above the cultivated farmland, whilst oak woodlands are found on steep banks and valley sides, and there is an extensive assortment of moorland and mountain vegetation types. Limestone vegetation is not widespread, but is particularly important to conservationists because so many unusual species occur.

Farming and forestry account for nearly all of the land surface, but there are other land-uses that overlap with this. For example, 20% of Wales is designated as National Parks. Unlike the National Parks in some other countries, like the US, the three Welsh Parks, Snowdonia, the Pembrokeshire Coast and the Brecon Beacons incorporate large swathes of farmed and afforested land. Other areas are designated Areas of Outstanding Natural Beauty, also comprising a mixture of land uses. Many forested areas are used for recreational activities like cycling, hiking and car rallying, whilst several of the rivers provide facilities for canoeists, and some of the lakes and reservoirs are popular for sailing. The high rainfall of Wales means that the river catchments (called "watersheds" in American English) are important for water supply, and have to be used in ways compatible with the safe collection and storage of water supplies. According to Welsh government research in 2010 the area of potential wind farm land in Wales was 3027 km^{2}.

Although wind farms put some constraints on farming and forestry, they are not incompatible with these land uses.

The most recent figures for proportions of agricultural land are from 2011, and for forest and woodland from 2015.

These figures show that nearly 50% of the land area was under permanent grass. Arable land occupied about 9% of the area, and rough grazing some 20%, with woodlands on farms accounting for more than 3%. Broadleaved (deciduous) woodland covered 5.5% and coniferous woodland (mainly forestry plantations) 6%. Natural Resources Wales' report on Woodlands for Wales indicators, currently (February 2018) states that the area of woodland in Wales is now 306,000 ha, comprising 156,000 ha of broadleaves, and 150,000 ha of conifers. Thus, since the 2015 statistics quoted above, broadleaved woodland has overtaken coniferous forests in its coverage of Wales. Other woodland types such as cleared and recently planted land covered a further 2% of the land.

The remaining 4.5% of the land is under urban and industrial land-uses, including a significant proportion of land spoiled by industrial wastes, like coal and slate tips.

The proportions of land covered by urban and industrial uses vary hugely from region to region, with areas of south-east Wales in particular being heavily urbanised. For example, Blaenau Gwent in the industrial part of south Wales is 20% built up, whilst Powys in mid-Wales is less than 1% built up.

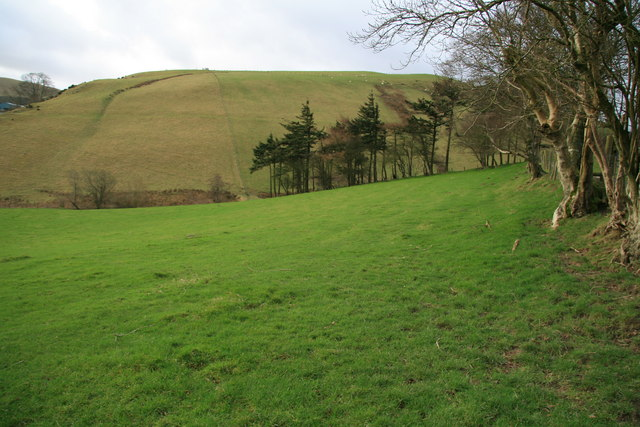
Sheep pasture at Cwmbyr, Powys, Wales

== Grassland ==
Grasslands are defined by the Encyclopedia of Ecology and Environmental Management as areas "dominated by herbaceous species in which grasses or sedges are abundant, accompanied by forbs [herbs which are not grasses or sedges] .... with sometimes scattered shrubs and trees."

Ley, or improved grasslands are periodically ploughed and re-seeded with cultivated varieties of grasses, sometimes combined with clover, which are deemed suitable for the extant soil and climatic conditions.

The moist Atlantic climate of lowland Wales is ideal for grass growth, and this is why so much of the land is given over to the production of grass to feed livestock. Some parts, like the Vale of Tywi, are particularly famed for the production of high quality grass, and consequently, high quality stock – beef and dairy cattle in the case quoted.

Land used for grazing is called pasture (from the Latin pastus, past participle of pascere, "to feed"). Pasture lands in the narrow sense are enclosed tracts of farmland, grazed by domesticated livestock, such as sheep, cattle, horses or pigs. The vegetation of tended pasture consists mainly of grasses, with variable contributions of legumes and other forbs. Pasture is typically grazed throughout the summer, in contrast to meadow which is ungrazed or used for grazing only after being mown to make hay or other forms of conserved grass for animal fodder which can be used to feed the stock outside the growing season.

"The composition of lowland grasslands in Wales, as in many other parts of western Europe, was transformed during the twentieth century. Over the period between 1950 and 1980 especially, farmers were encouraged and supported to undertake grassland improvement by ploughing, reseeding, fertiliser application and, where considered necessary, drainage." During the period between 1930 and 1990, some 97% of the drier types of semi-natural grasslands were lost, converted to improved grasslands which are far more productive, but contain far fewer species.

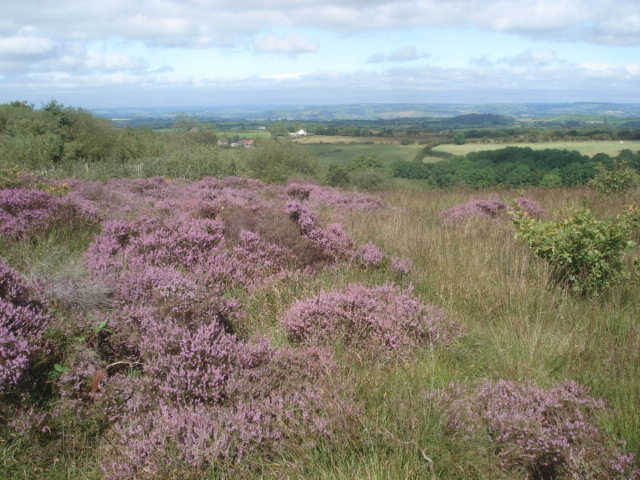
Heathland north of Llyn Llech Owain, Carmarthenshire

Rough grazing land is included under rough grazing in the statistics above, and comprises a range of semi-natural vegetation types that are generally not cultivated or fertilised. There are large swathes of land dominated by purple moor-grass (Molinia caerulea). This coarse and tussocky grass has low value for grazing, and thrives on wet, usually peaty soils in the uplands. It tends to be maintained by light grazing (usually by sheep), which inhibits the growth of trees and dwarf-shrubs like heather and bilberry, and promotes a species-poor plant community. Where grazing is reduced, boggy forms of heather moorland occur. The wettest of these vegetation types are termed mires, although most people would refer to them as bogs. Drier forms of vegetation dominated by ling (Calluna vulgaris) and heathers (Erica species) often with bilberry and a variety of other specialised herbs and shrubs are termed heaths. These once covered large areas of upland Wales, but are now somewhat fragmented, predominating on markedly acidic, shallow soils. Heathlands also occur to a lesser extent in lowland situations, often in association with gorse (on shallower acidic soils) and bracken (on deeper acidic soils). Coastal heathlands occur where cliff areas are fenced off from grazing stock, and wind exposure severely restricts tree growth. Calluna heaths have become a rarity in Europe, and are the subject of conservation efforts, aimed at maintaining their specialised biodiversity.

== Woodland and forestry ==
Woodland is defined by Chambers English dictionary as "land covered with wood" i.e. dominated by tree species. Forestry is defined as "1. the science and art of planting, tending and managing forests; 2. Forest country". This implies that forests have been planted by mankind for a variety of purposes, but mostly for exploitation for timber and pulp for the paper industry. The majority of Forests in Wales were planted by the British Forestry Commission, a UK government agency. Since 2016 the Forestry Commission in Wales has been taken over by Natural Resources Wales (NRW).

NRW publishes an annual report called "Woodlands for Wales indicators", which currently (February 2018) states that the area of woodland in Wales is now 306000 ha., comprising 156000 ha. of broadleaves, and 150000 ha of conifers. Thus, since the 2015 statistics quoted above, broadleaved woodland has overtaken coniferous forests in its coverage of Wales.

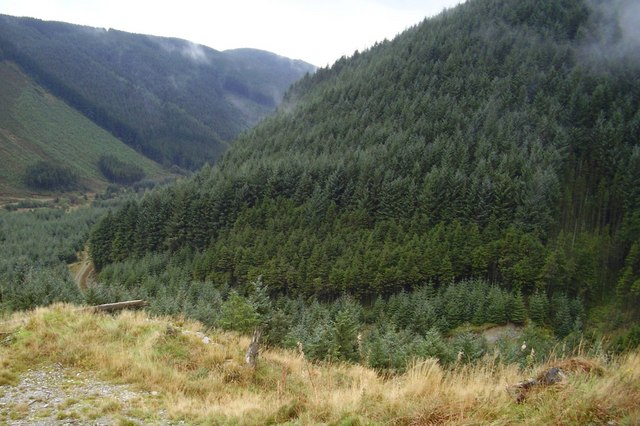
Typical upland forest plantations in central Wales

The NRW provides a useful map of Welsh woodlands in its publication "Welsh woodlands – their extent, nature and character". Most of the former Forestry Commission coniferous plantations are in the uplands at altitudes between 200 and 500 m. The highest mountains are beyond the tree-line, which is relatively low in Wales due to low summer temperatures, peaty soils and high wind speeds at altitudes above about 500 m. In recent years there has been some interest and research in the growing of fast-producing woodland crops like willow for biomass for energy production. As the Wales Energy Crops Information Centre points out, this process, using three-year rotations, is more akin to arable cropping than to forestry.

== Arable land ==
Arable land, (from Latin arabilis, "able to be ploughed") is, according to one definition, land capable of being ploughed and used to grow crops. In Wales it accounts for 13% of all agricultural land. Like the dairy industry, arable farming is restricted to the more productive areas. These are predominantly in lowland areas in the southeast, northeast, coastal regions and river valleys.

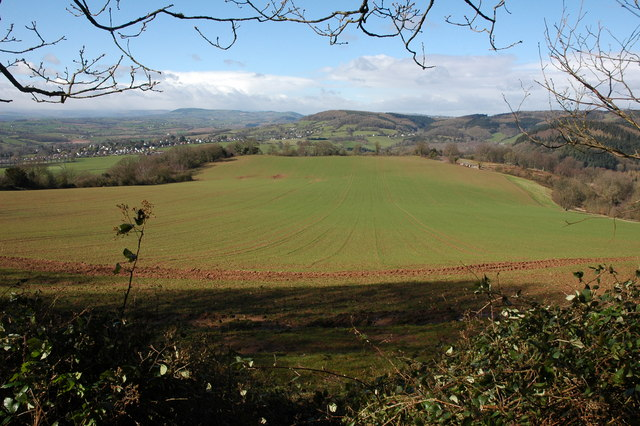
Arable land near Monmouth

In 2014 the rough breakdown of crops in Wales was: horticulture 60%, potatoes 20% and cereals 20%. Today (2018) there are small areas of specialist crops like oilseed rape (5080 ha in 2016) and linseed.

There are several vineyards in Wales, especially between the Vale of Glamorgan and Monmouth.
