= Gwynt y Môr =

Offshore wind farm off of Wales

Gwynt y Môr Wind Farm
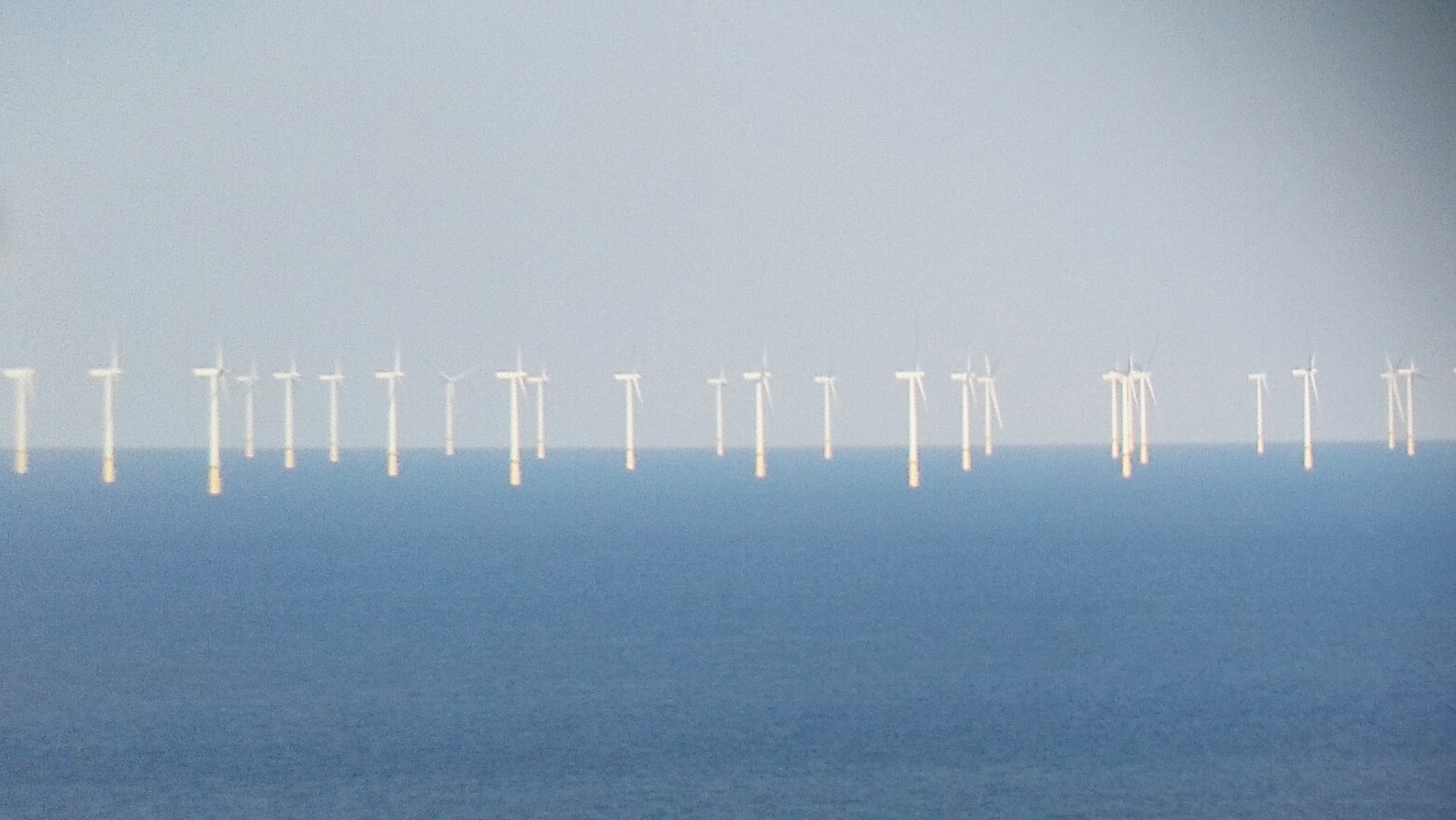
- Country: Wales, UK
- Location: off the coast of Wales, UK
- Coordinates: 53°27′N 3°35′W
- Status: Operational
- Commission date: 18 June 2015
- Construction cost: €2bn
- Owner: RWE
- Operator: Gwynt y Môr Offshore Wind Farm Limited

Wind farm
- Type: Offshore
- Max. water depth: 12–33 m (39–108 ft)
- Distance from shore: 18 km (11.2 mi)
- Hub height: 98 m (322 ft)
- Rotor diameter: 107 m (351 ft)
- Site area: 80 km^{2} (30.9 sq mi)

Power generation
- Units operational: 160 × 3.6 MW
- Make and model: Siemens Gamesa SWT-3.6-107 (160)
- Nameplate capacity: 576 MW
- Capacity factor: 31.7%

External links
- Commons: Related media on Commons

Wind farm layout

Gwynt y Môr (Welsh for 'sea wind') is a 576-megawatt (MW) offshore wind farm located off the coast of north Wales. At the time of opening in 2015, it was the second largest offshore windfarm in the world. The farm has 160 wind turbines of 150 metres (490 ft) tip height above mean sea level.

Planning consent for the project was granted on 3 December 2008. The project has a value of 2 billion Euros, of which 1.2 billion Euros were spent on turbines and electrical connections. Construction began in 2012, power production started in September 2013, construction phase ended in November 2014, and final commissioning occurred in June 2015.

In May 2020 plans to add up to 107 new turbines were submitted to Flintshire Council, increasing the windfarm by an extra 41 square miles, with a generating capacity of at least 100 megawatts. This is being developed as Awel y Môr.

== Design and planning ==
As with all offshore wind farms in the UK the Crown Estate owns the seabed at Gwynt y Môr. It has agreed to lease the land to RWE npower renewables. The wind farm is located close to the existing North Hoyle and Rhyl Flats offshore wind farms. These projects are wholly or partly owned by E.ON Next renewables, a subsidiary of German company RWE. In the case of Gwynt y Môr, RWE holds 50%, Stadtwerke München holds 30%, Siemens holds 10% and UK Green Investment Bank holds 10%.

With 160 turbines of 3.6MW Siemens SWT-3.6-107, Gwynt y Môr will be Wales' largest wind farm. The output of 1,950 GWh per year is capable of powering around 400,000 homes, or 30% of the homes in Wales. This prevents the release of about 1.7 million tonnes of carbon dioxide every year.

Planning consent for the project was granted on 3 December 2008. The project has a value of 2 billion Euros. 1.2 billion Euros will go to Siemens for turbines and electrical connections.

Two floating experimental LIDAR wind measurement stations have been tested at the site for two years.

== Construction ==
Construction work began offshore in January 2011 when pieces of rock were laid on softer parts of the seabed to secure the foundations of the turbines. Work began on laying undersea cables from the windfarm to the shore in August 2012. The project uses four 132 kV subsea cables manufactured by NKT. In order to feed electricity into the national grid, a substation was built near St Asaph in Denbighshire.

Power production started in September 2013. Final commissioning was completed on 18 June 2015.

Its levelised cost has been estimated at £179/MWh.

== See also ==
- Wind power in the United Kingdom
- List of offshore wind farms
- List of offshore wind farms in the United Kingdom
- List of offshore wind farms in the Irish Sea
- npower (UK)
