= Vattenfall UK =

UK windfarm operator

- Company type: Subsidiary
- Industry: Renewable energy
- Founded: 2000
- Headquarters: London, England
- Area served: United Kingdom
- Key people: Claus Wattendrup (country manager)
- Products: Electrical power
- Parent: Vattenfall
- Website: www.vattenfall.co.uk

Vattenfall UK (formerly: Nuon Renewables) is a subsidiary of Vattenfall headquartered in London. It generates renewable energy, primarily through wind farms.

== History ==
Vattenfall UK was established as Nuon Renewables in 2000. It was a United Kingdom-based subsidiary of N.V. Nuon Energy. It has built wind farms across the UK with a potential annual power generation total of eight hundred megawatts.

In 2009, N.V. Nuon Energy was acquired by Vattenfall. In January 2012, it was merged with Vattenfall's other assets in the United Kingdom and was renamed Vattenfall UK.

In March 2020, Vattenfall UK sold its electric vehicle network to Statkraft and its supply side business, iSupply Energy, to EDF Energy.

== Operations ==
Vattenfall's core businesses in the United Kingdom are renewable power generation, heating, business-to-business sales and distribution. In 2025, Vattenfall UK began exploring the sale of its heating and electricity distribution businesses.

The company owns and operates numerous wind farms, some as small as their ten megawatt Parc Cynog wind farm, to others as large as Pen y Cymoedd Wind Energy, a 228-megawatt development. Their largest wind farm is Thanet, with a nameplate capacity of 300-megawatts. In 2023, Vattenfall UK announced that it planned to pause any further offshore wind farm development in Norfolk, and sold its Norfolk Wind Zone to RWE for £1 billion.

Wind farms
Project	Location	Windmills	State	Generating Capacity	Total Height	Year Submitted	Year Operational
Aultmore Forest - Buckie - Windfarm	Aultmore Forest, Drybridge, Buckie	16	Proposed	105.60 megawatts	200 meters	2024	N/A
Clashindarroch	Clashindarroch Forest, Huntly	18	Operational	37 megawatts	N/A	2009	2015
Clashindarroch 2	Clashindarroch Forest, Huntly	14	Approved	77 megawatts	180 meters	2019	N/A
Edinbane Wind Farm	Cruachan Brinn Mhicaskill, Edinbane, Portree, Highlands	18	Operational	41.4 megawatts		2002	2010
European Offshore Wind Deployment Centre (EOWDC) - testing and demonstration site	Aberdeenshire	11	Operational	96.8 megawatts	N/A	2011	2018
Harrington	Former RAF; Harrington Airfield	7	Denied	14 megawatts	126 meters		
Hirddywel	Hirddywel	9	Proposed	27 megawatts	125 meters	2010	
Kentish Flats	60 km east of London	30	Operational	90 megawatts		2002	2005
Kentish Flats 2	60 km east of London	15	Operational	49.5 megawatts		2012	2015
Llanbadarn; Fynydd	North of Llanbadarn Fynydd in Radnorshire, Powys	17	Denied	51 megawatts	126.5 meters	2007	N/A
Muir Mhòr	63 km east of Peterhead	67	Proposed	51 megawatts	340 meters	2024	
Mynydd Waun Fawr	Southwest of Llanerfyl in Powys, Wales	15 (revised to 13)	Withdrawn	37.5 megawatts	110 meters		
Ormonde Offshore	10 km off Barrow on Furness, Heysham	30	Operational	150 megawatts		2005	2012
Ourack	6 km north of Granton-on-Spey	18	Under Development	105 megawatts	180 meters	2022	
Pen Y Cymoedd	Land stretches from the Upper Afan Valley to end of Cynon Valley	76	Operational	228 megawatts		2009	2017
Quantans Hill Wind Farm	Carsphairn, Castle Douglas	14	Proposed	96 megawatts	200 meters	2023	
Ray Wind Farm	Kirkwhelpington, Newcastle-upon-Tyne	16	Operational	54.4 megawatts		2005	2017
South Kyle Wind Farm	within Kyle Forest and to the east of Dalmellington	50	Under Development	240 megawatts	150 meters	2013	N/A
South Kyle Wind Farm 2	within Kyle Forest and to the east of Dalmellington	11	Proposed	92.4 megwatts	200 meters	2025	
Thanet	11 km off North Foreland Kent	100	Operational	300 megawatts		2005	2010
