= Pen y Cymoedd =

Wind farm in Wales

Pen y Cymoedd Wind Farm
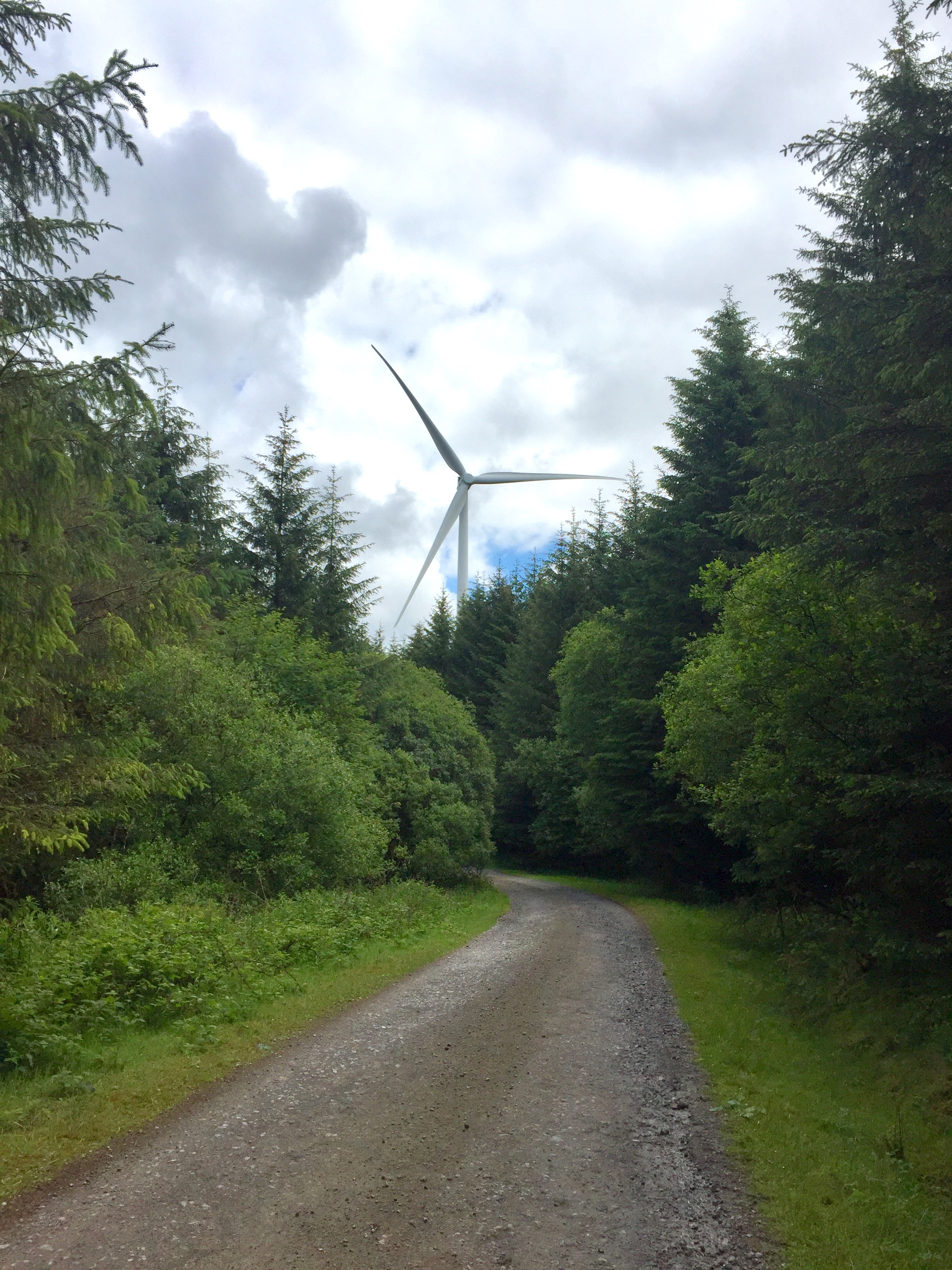
- Country: Wales
- Location: between Neath and Aberdare in south Wales.
- Coordinates: 51°42′40″N 3°33′43″W
- Status: Operational
- Commission date: 2 January 2017
- Owner: Vattenfall
- Operator: Vattenfall

Wind farm
- Hub height: 89.5 m
- Rotor diameter: 108 m (354 ft)

Power generation
- Units operational: 76 × 3 MW
- Make and model: Siemens Gamesa SWT-3.0-108 (28); Siemens Gamesa SWT-3.0-113 (48)
- Nameplate capacity: 228 MW
- Capacity factor: 30%
- Annual net output: 0.6 TWh

External links
- Website: group.vattenfall.com/uk/what-we-do/our-projects/pen-y-cymoedd

Pen y Cymoedd ("Head of the Valleys") is a wind farm located between Neath and Aberdare in south Wales. It opened in 2017.

== History ==
=== Development ===
Natural Resources Wales signed a lease agreement with Vattenfall of Sweden and its British-based subsidiary Vattenfall United Kingdom (formerly Nuon Renewables), to develop what will be the United Kingdom's highest altitude wind farm, on a site owned by Natural Resources Wales, previously the Forestry Commission Wales. The project has seen the installation of 76 turbines with a peak power of 228 MW_{p}, that are planned to operate for 25 years, and to generate up to 0.6 TWh/yr, an amount enough to power up to 140 000 homes with an annual consumption of 4 266 kWh. The turbine manufacturer is Siemens Wind Power.

During the planning process, Vattenfall (at that time: Nuon) agreed to contribute about £1.85m annually to a community fund and to invest £3m in a habitat restoration scheme, and the following parties contributed to the debate:

- Glyncorrwg Action Group: the wind farm will look down on the village of Glyncorrwg in the Afan Valley. Residents of the village campaigned against the development, which they claim would destroy the character of the landscape.
- Campaign for the Protection of Rural Wales: objected on the grounds of its potential impact on a sensitive peat habitat.
- Neath Port Talbot County Borough Council: the planning committee decided not to object to the scheme in January 2012, after councillors carried out a site visit, although they set a number of conditions.

The project gained final planning permission in May 2012.

=== Construction and opening ===
The first turbine was fully completed in April 2016 and began generating electricity in autumn 2016. The final (76_{th}) turbine was installed on 2 March 2017, and the farm has been fully operational since 7 May 2017. The farm was officially opened in September 2017.
