= Rhyl Flats =

Wind farm off the coast of Wales

Rhyl Flats Wind Farm
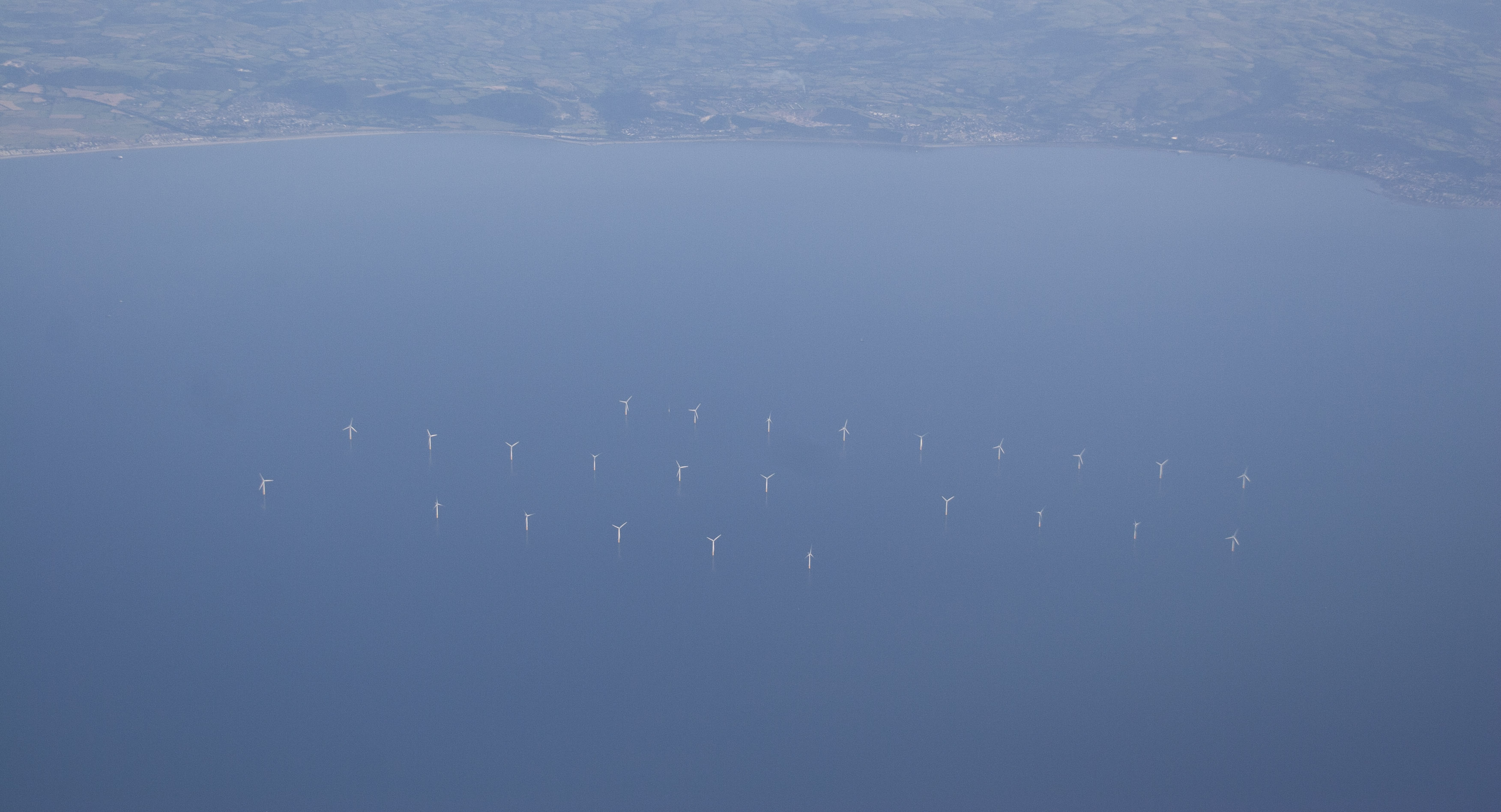
- Viewed from the air, looking south
- Country: United Kingdom
- Location: Liverpool Bay, Wales
- Coordinates: 53°22′N 3°39′W
- Status: Operational
- Construction began: June 2007
- Commission date: December 2009
- Owners: RWE (50.1%); Green Investment Group (24.95%); Greencoat UK Wind (24.95%)
- Operator: RWE

Wind farm
- Type: Offshore
- Distance from shore: 8 km (5 mi)

Power generation
- Units operational: 25 x 3.6 MW
- Make and model: Siemens Wind Power
- Nameplate capacity: 90 MW

External links
- Commons: Related media on Commons

Wind farm layout

Rhyl Flats Offshore Wind Farm is a 25 turbine wind farm approximately 5 miles (8 km) north east of Llandudno in North Wales. It is Wales' second offshore wind farm and the third offshore wind farm to be built within Liverpool Bay. It has a maximum rated output of 90 MW.

In 2013, owners RWE sold two 24.95% stakes to the UK Green Investment Bank and Greencoat UK Wind, retaining a 50.1% stake.

== Construction ==
The Rhyl Flats project was initially developed by Celtic Offshore Wind Limited (COWL) as part of the UK's Round 1 offshore wind farm programme. COWL received consent for the project in 2002, and in December 2002 the project was purchased by Npower Renewables (formerly National Wind Power and now a part of Innogy, a subsidiary of the German firm RWE), who were also developing the neighbouring North Hoyle and Gwynt y Môr offshore wind farms. Offshore construction work at Rhyl Flats began in July 2007. Foundation works was completed in August 2008. The completed project was officially opened on 2 December 2009.

North Hoyle was completed in 2003, just a few kilometres east of Rhyl Flats. The Round 1 projects were intended to act as testbeds; building the UK's understanding of offshore wind, whilst in total also providing well over 1000 MW of green generating capacity for the UK. All of the Round 1 offshore wind farms were limited to a maximum area of 10 km^{2} (3.9 sq mi), and no more than 30 wind turbines.

The project uses three export cables.

== Output ==
The first electricity was supplied by the site on 15 July 2009. The project consists of 25 Siemens Wind Power SWT-107-3.6 wind turbines, each rated at 3.6 MW capacity. This gives the project a maximum output of 90 MW; a third greater than the neighbouring North Hoyle Offshore Wind Farm, but with five fewer wind turbines and spread over a smaller area. At the time of installation, Rhyl Flats is expected to generate enough electricity to power 60,000 homes on average.

Its levelised cost has been estimated at £126/MWh.

== See also ==
- Wind power in the United Kingdom
- List of offshore wind farms in the United Kingdom
- List of offshore wind farms
- List of offshore wind farms in the Irish Sea
