= Parc Cynog =

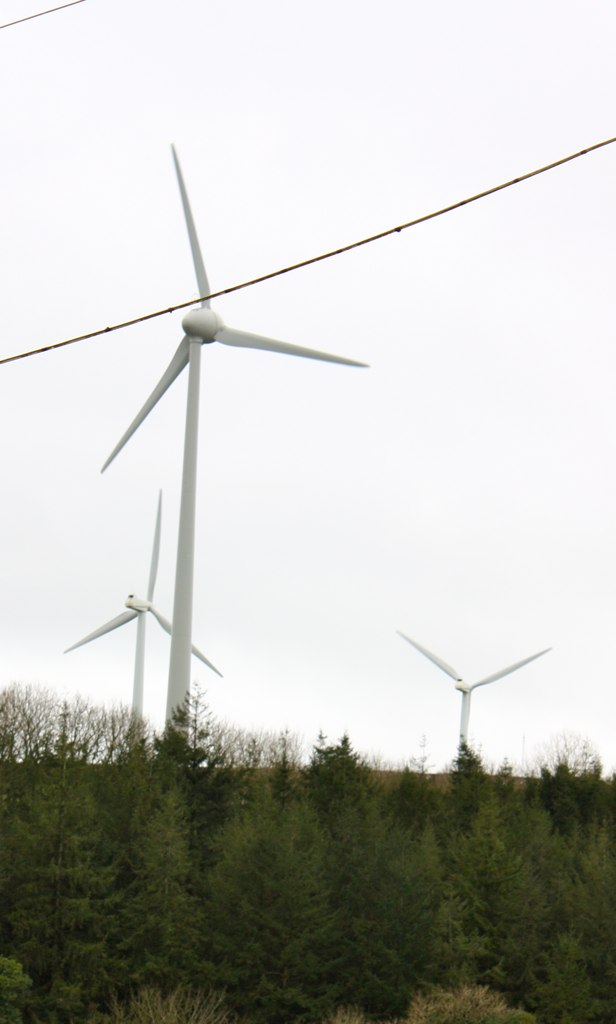
- Location of Parc Cynog within Wales
- Country: Wales, United Kingdom
- Coordinates: 51.758°N 4.526°W
- Status: Operational
- Commission date: 2001
- Owner: Vattenfall
- Operator: Nuon Renewables

Wind farm
- Type: Onshore

Power generation
- Units operational: 11
- Nameplate capacity: 8.4 MW

Parc Cynog is a wind farm operated by Nuon Renewables in Wales.

Parc Cynog Windfarm was built in 2001, and currently consists of eleven wind turbines.

There were originally five turbines on site which are Micon M1800-750/48 turbines built in 2001, by 2009, a further six turbines were installed by Enercon Wind Energy. The turbine type used was Enercon E48/800KW.

The windfarm is owned by Vattenfall.
