= North Hoyle Offshore Wind Farm =

Wind farm in Wales

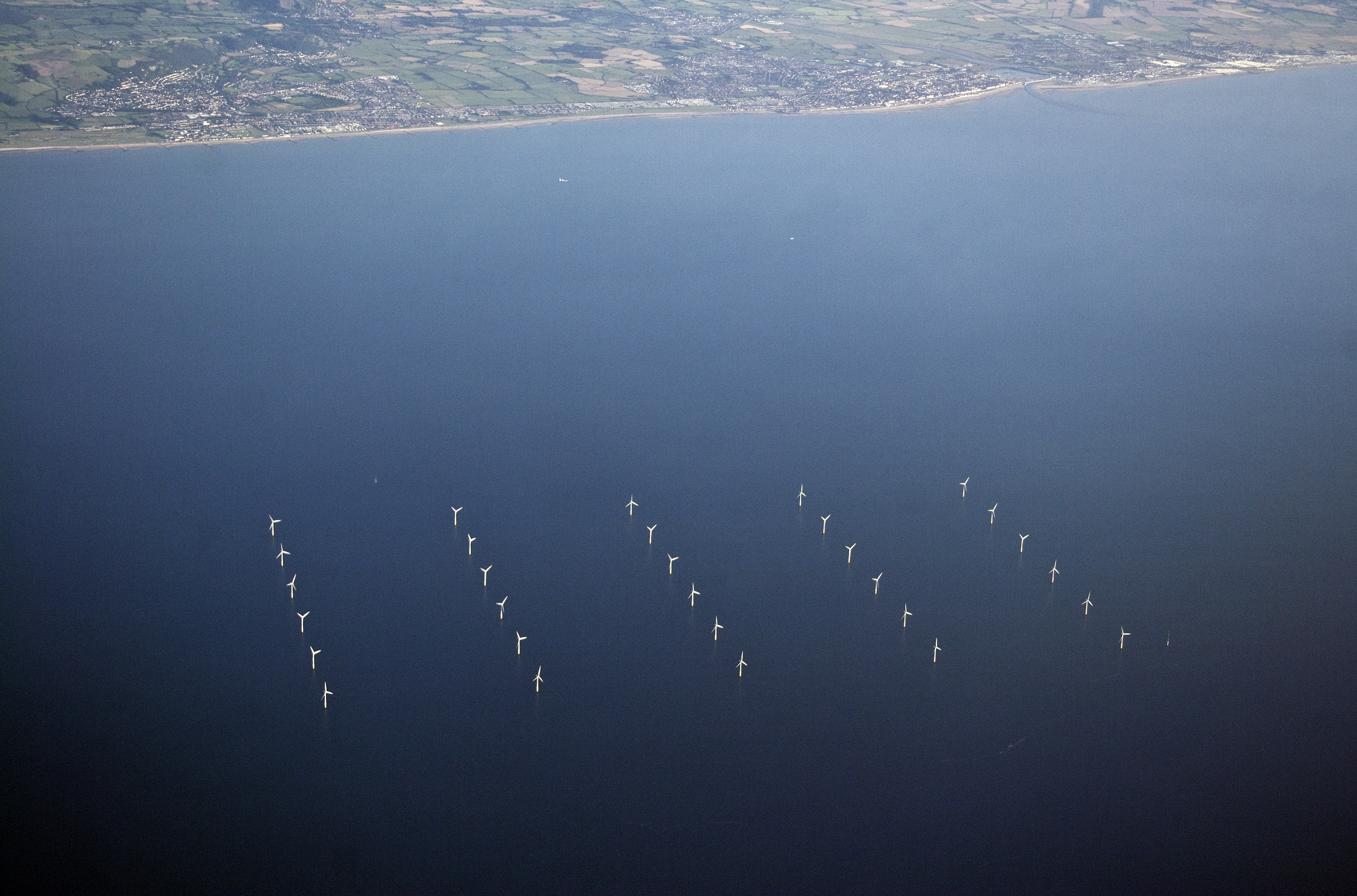
- North Hoyle wind farm from the air
- Country: Wales
- Location: Liverpool Bay, north east Wales
- Coordinates: 53°23′27″N 03°27′09″W
- Status: Operational
- Commission date: November 2003
- Construction cost: £80 million
- Owner: Greencoat UK Wind
- Operator: Greencoat UK Wind

Wind farm
- Type: Offshore
- Distance from shore: 7.5 km (4.7 mi)
- Rotor diameter: 80 m (260 ft)
- Site area: 10 km^{2} (3.9 sq mi)

Power generation
- Units operational: 30 × 2 MW
- Make and model: Vestas V80 (30)
- Nameplate capacity: 60 MW
- Capacity factor: 33-36%

External links
- Commons: Related media on Commons

Wind farm layout

North Hoyle Offshore Wind Farm is Wales' first offshore wind farm, and the UK's first major offshore renewable power project. Situated in Liverpool Bay, it commenced operation in 2003.

The first of the UK's Round 1 offshore wind farms, North Hoyle covers an area of 10 square kilometres (3.9 sq mi), and is located approximately 7.5 kilometres (4.7 mi) off the coast of North Wales, between the towns of Rhyl and Prestatyn. The Round 1 projects were intended to act as testbeds; building the UK's understanding of offshore wind power, whilst in total also providing well over 1,000 MW of green generating capacity for the UK. All of the Round 1 offshore wind farms were limited to a maximum area of 10 square kilometres (3.9 sq mi), and no more than 30 wind turbines. It was built using the TIV MPI Resolution, the first jack-up wind turbine installation vessel in the world.

The wind farm's 30 Vestas V80 Offshore wind turbines are each rated at 2 MW capacity, giving a maximum project output of 60 MW. At the time of installation this was the most powerful wind farm in the UK, producing sufficient electricity annually to power 50,000 homes. Between 2004 and 2010, the capacity factor was between 33 and 36%. Its levelised cost has been estimated at £77/MWh.

Independent surveys carried out for the operators of North Hoyle have shown that the wind farm is very popular among holidaymakers and local residents. An opinion poll carried out in 2003, after its construction, showed that 73% of people expressed support for the project and only 5% opposed it.

== See also ==
- List of offshore wind farms in the United Kingdom
- List of offshore wind farms in the Irish Sea
- Wind power in the United Kingdom
