= Energy in Wales =

Overview of electricity production in Wales

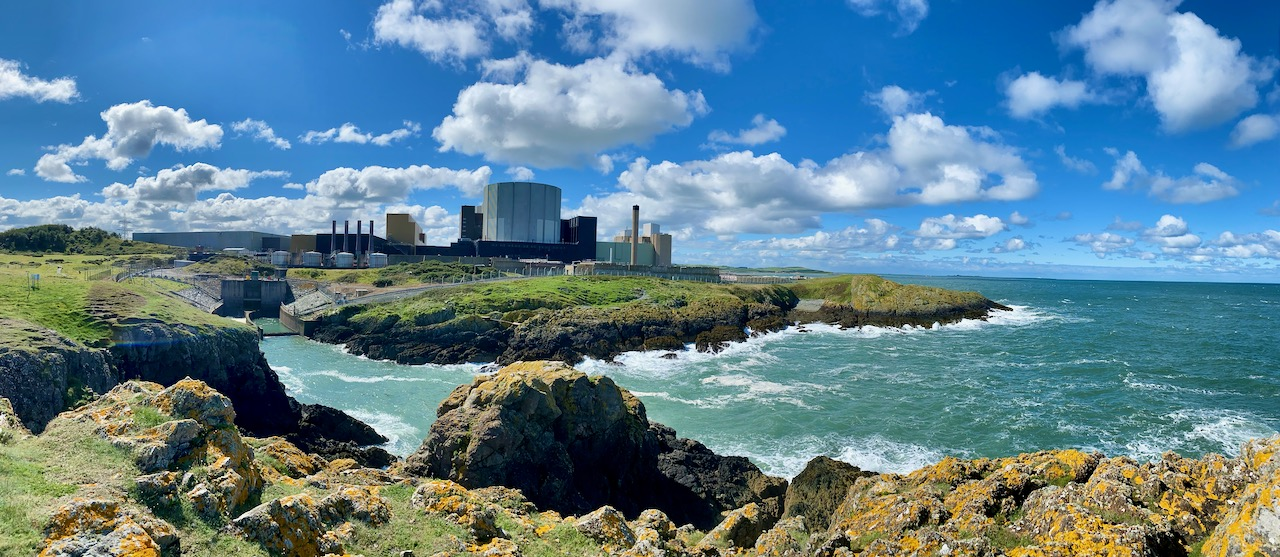
Wylfa nuclear power station

Energy in Wales is the production of electricity in Wales.

== Electricity production ==
Wales generated 22 TWh of electricity in 2024 and consumed 13 TWh in 2023. Wales is a net exporter of electricity to the rest of the UK, Ireland and the wider European electricity network. Electricity generation in Wales includes a mix of technologies, including gas, wind, hydroelectricity, solar photovoltaic and biomass electricity.

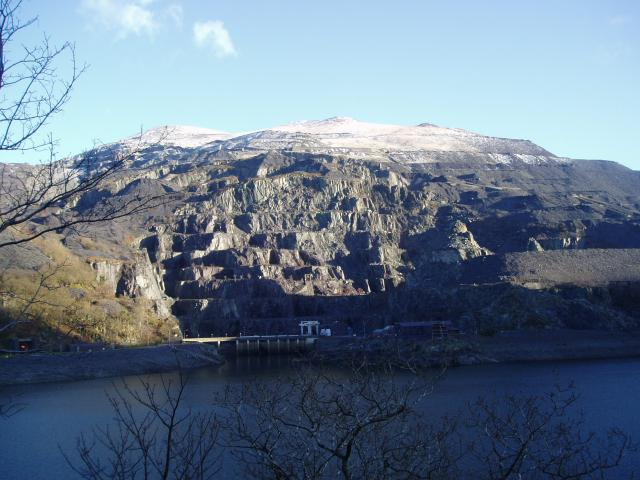
Dinorwig Power station (hydro-electric dam)

== Fossil fuels ==
Fossil fuels are not renewables; historically, the economy of Wales has been driven by fossil fuels. Coal mining in Wales had become a major industry by the end of the 18th century, and then further expanded to supply steam-coal for the steam vessels that were beginning to trade around the world. The Cardiff Coal Exchange set the world price for steam-coal, and Cardiff became a major coal-exporting port. The South Wales Coalfield was at its peak in 1913 and was one of the largest coalfields in the world. However coal mining declined steeply during the late 20th century, and in 2019 the electrical energy generated from coal was only 2% of total electrical energy generated. The last coal-fired power station in Wales was at Aberthaw; it finally closed its doors in March 2020.

In 2019 the total capacity of electricity generated from fossil fuels was 7.4 GW, made up of:

- gas power (5.6 GW)
- coal (1.6 GW)
- diesel (0.2 GW)

== Renewable energy ==
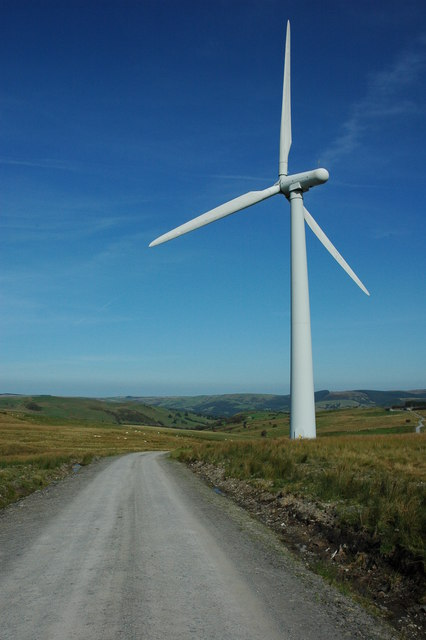
Wind turbine, Carno Wind farm

In 2024, renewable electricity generation in Wales reached 7.9 TWh, supplying 36% of total electricity generation and equivalent to 54% of its electricity consumption. The Welsh Government set a target of 70% of consumption by 2030 and 100% by 2035. The natural resource base for renewable energy is high by European standards, with the core sources being wind, wave, and tidal. Wales has a long history of renewable energy: in the 1880s, the first house in Wales with electric lighting powered from its own hydro-electric power station was Plas Tan y Bwlch, Gwynedd. In 1963, the Ffestiniog Power Station was constructed, providing a large scale generation of hydroelectricity, and in November 1973, the Centre for Alternative Technology was opened in Machynlleth.

=== Renewable energy targets ===
In 2017, the Welsh Government announced a target of meeting 70% of Wales’ electricity demand from Welsh renewable electricity sources by 2030. By 2018, Wales generated over 3,864 MW renewable energy from 68,728 projects. In 2021, the Welsh government said that more than half the country's energy needs were being met by renewable sources, 2 percent of which was from 363 hydropower projects.

=== Renewable energy projects ===
==== Swansea tidal lagoon ====
In 2015 a tidal lagoon for Swansea Bay was proposed, to generate electricity. However, in June 2018, the UK Government withdrew support for the plan as an independent study showed that it would not be viable.

In January 2023, plans for a new Swansea tidal lagoon project called "Blue Eden" emerged, but this time fully funded by the private sector. It would include an electric battery manufacturing plant, a battery storage facility, a tidal lagoon in Swansea Bay with a floating solar farm, a data storage centre, a green hydrogen production facility, and an oceanic and climate change research centre. The project could start within 18 months.

==== Morlais tidal stream ====
The Morlais tidal stream project, on the west coast of Anglesey, could deliver up to 120 MW of renewable clean energy. £31 million was secured in 2022 for the first phase of construction from the EU's European Regional Development fund via the Welsh Government. The onshore grid connection works were constructed in 2023, and Mark Drakeford formally opened the onshore substation in October 2023.
