= List of wind farms in the Republic of Ireland =

This is a list of wind farms in the Republic of Ireland.

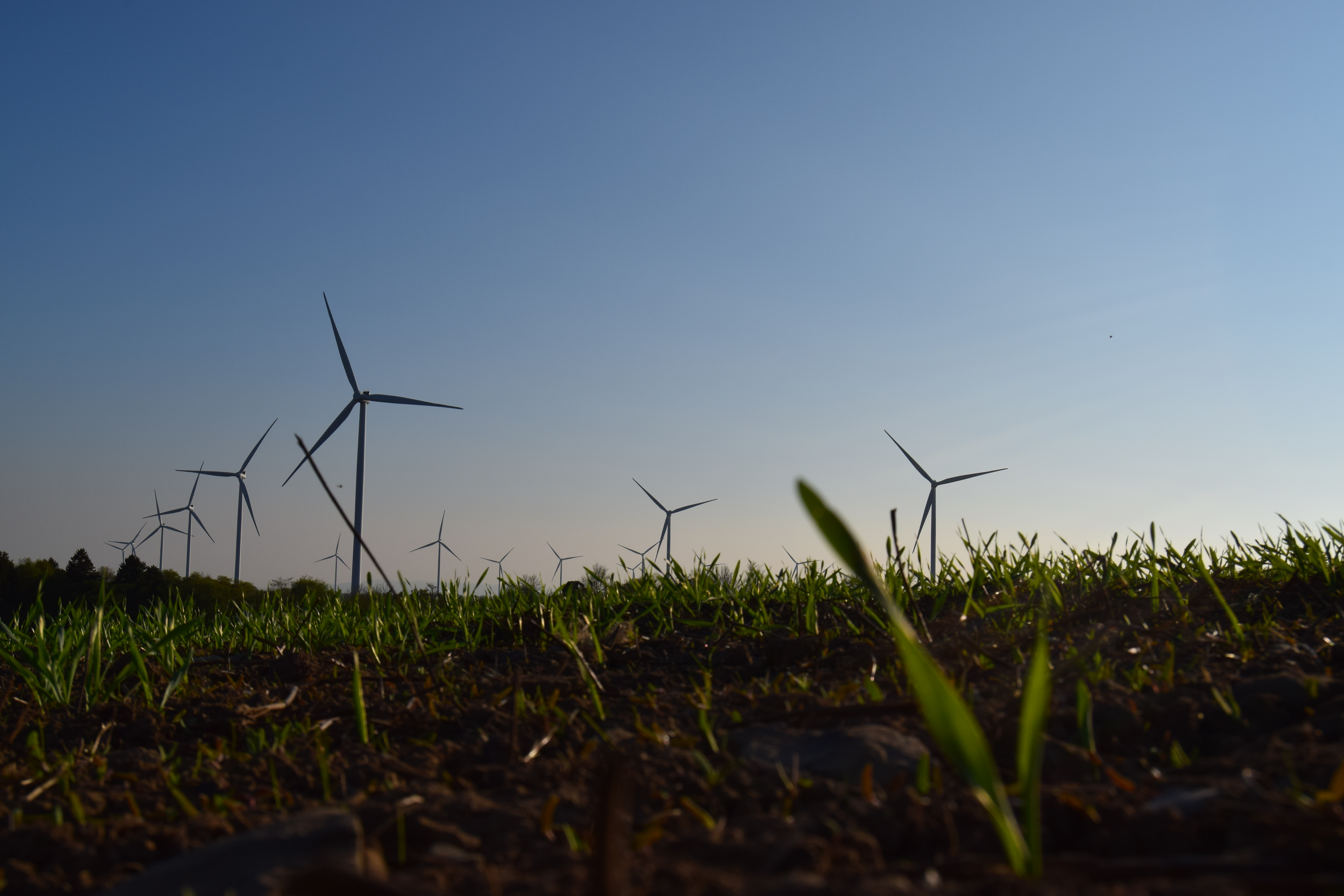
Mountlucas Wind Farm in Co Offaly

Locations of all the wind farms which have coordinates below, may be seen on a map together by clicking "Map all coordinates using OpenStreetMap" at the right side of this page.

== Operating ==
=== Onshore ===
Wind farm	Capacity (MW)	No.	Turbine vendor	Model	Size (MW)	Operator	Completed	County	Coordinates
Altagowlan	7. 65	9	Siemens Gamesa	G52	0.85	B9	2005	Roscommon	54.1215°N 8.1454°W
Anarget	1.2	2	Enercon	E-40	0.6		2004	Donegal	54.7553°N 8.1689°W
Anarget Extension	0.9	1	Enercon	E-44	0.9		2007	Donegal	54.7553°N 8.1689°W
Astellas	0.8	1	Enercon	E-53	0.8		2011	Kerry	52.1116°N 9.7769°W
Athea	34	16	GE			SSE Renewables	2014	Limerick	52.4408°N 9.2909°W
Ballincollig Hill	13.3	16	Enercon	E-44; E-48	0.9; 0.8		2009	Kerry	52.3104°N 9.5857°W
Ballinlough/Ikerrin	2.55	3	Vestas	V52	0.85		2006	Tipperary	52.8300°N 9.0113°W
Ballinveny	2.55	3	Vestas	V52	0.85		2006	Tipperary	52.8194°N 7.9510°W
Ballybane	29.9	13	Enercon	E-70	2.3	Windprospect	2008	Cork	51.6329°N 9.3762°W
Ballymartin	6.9	3	Enercon	E-82	2.3	Ørsted	2010	Kilkenny	52.3882°N 7.1067°W
Ballywater	42	21	Enercon	E-70	2		2006	Wexford	52.5353°N 6.2396°W
Bawnmore 1	11.5	5	Enercon	E-82	2.3		2011	Cork	51.9533°N 8.9138°W
Bawnmore 2 (Carriganima)	13.8	6	Enercon	E-82	2.3		2011	Cork	51.9905°N 9.0207°W
Barnesmore	15	25	Vestas	V42	0.60	ScottishPower Renewables	1997	Donegal	54.6966°N 7.9358°W
Beal Hill 1	1.65	1	Vestas	V66	1.65		2000	Kerry	52.5643°N 9.6326°W
Beal Hill 2	2.55	3	Vestas	V52	0.85		2003	Kerry	52.5643°N 9.6326°W
Beallough	1.7	2	Vestas	V52	0.85		2008	Waterford	52.2718°N 7.3480°W
Beam Hill	14	8	Vestas	V66	1.75		2008	Donegal	55.1982°N 7.4402°W
Beenageeha	3.96	6	Vestas	V47	0.66	B9	2000	Kerry	52.3307°N 9.5610°W
Bindoo	48	32	GE	1.5s	1.5	SSE Renewables	2007	Cavan	54.0121°N 7.1070°W
Blackbanks/1	3.4	4	Vestas	V52	0.85	ESBI	2001	Leitrim	54.1444°N 8.1911°W
Blackbanks/2	6.8	8	Vestas	V52	0.85	ESBI	2005	Leitrim	54.1444°N 8.1911°W
Boggeragh	57	19	Vestas	V90	3		2009	Cork	52.0505°N 8.8980°W
Booltiagh 1	18	12	GE	1.5s	1.5	Ørsted	2005	Clare	52.7822°N 9.2462°W
Booltiagh 2	12	6			2	Ørsted	2013	Clare	
Boolynagleragh	40	18	Nordex	N90	2.5	Invis Energy	2020	Clare	
Bruckana	42	14	Siemens Gamesa	3.0DD-101	3	Bord na Móna	2014	Tipperary; Kilkenny; Laois	52.7823°N 7.6688°W
Burtonport	0.66	1	Vestas	V47	0.66	Burtonport Fisheries	2003	Donegal	54.9800°N 8.4403°W
Caherdowney	9.2	4	Enercon	E-70	2.3		2012	Cork	52.0011°N 9.1170°W
Cappawhite	51	17	Vestas	V112	3	ESB	2017	Tipperary	52.6076°N 8.1609°W
Cark	15	25	NEG Micon	NM43	0.6	B9	1997	Donegal	54.8865°N 7.8803°W
Carnsore	11.9	14	Vestas	V52	0.85	ESB	2002	Wexford	52.1787°N 6.3623°W
Carrane Hill	3.4	4	Siemens Gamesa	G52	0.85	ESB	2006	Sligo	54.1342°N 8.2298°W
Carrigcannon	23	10	Enercon	E-70	2.3		2010	Cork	52.0703°N 8.8990°W
Carrigdangan	54.3	9			6.03		2021	Cork	51.8029°N 9.1387°W
Carrig	2.55	3	Vestas	V52	0.85		2006	Tipperary	53.0318°N 7.9777°W
Carrons	4.6	2	Enercon	E-82	2.3		2010	Limerick	52.5409°N 9.0696°W
Carrowleagh	36.8	16	Enercon	E-70	2.3		2012	Mayo	54.1386°N 8.9503°W
Castledockrell	41.4	18	Enercon	E-70	2.3	Castledockrell Wind Group Limited	2011	Wexford	52.5865°N 6.6460°W
Castlepook	33.3	14	Nordex	N90	2.5	ESB; Coillte	2018	Cork	52.2938°N 8.5634°W
Cloghboola	48	16	Enercon	E82	3		2015	Kerry	52.3358°N 9.4380°W
Cloncreen	75	21	Vestas	V136	3.45	Bord na Móna	2022	Offaly	
Clydaghroe	4.6	2	Enercon	E70	2		2012	Cork	51.9894°N 9.1580°W
Coomacheo	41.4	18	Siemens Gamesa	2.3VS	2.3	SSE Renewables	2008	Cork	52.0144°N 9.145°W
Coomatallin	6	4	GE	1.5SE	1.5	SSE Renewables	2005	Cork	51.6508°N 9.0942°W
Cornacahan Hill	2.7	3	Enercon	E-44	0.9		2007	Donegal	54.6600°N 8.4584°W
Corneen	3	2	GE	1.5S	1.5	SSE Renewables	2001	Cavan	54.1432°N 7.6443°W
Corry Mountain	4.8	8	Vestas	V42	0.6	Eco Wind Power	1997	Leitrim	54.1300°N 8.1528°W
Crocane	1.6	2	Enercon	E-48	0.8		2010	Cork	51.8431°N 8.1566°W
Crockahenny	5.0	10	Enercon	E-40	0.5	ESB	1998	Donegal	55.1447°N 7.2704°W
Cronalaght 1&2	4.8	8	Vestas	V39	0.6		1997	Donegal	55.0645°N 8.2160°W
Cronelea	6.9	3	Enercon	E-70	2.3		2007	Wicklow	52.7791°N 6.5548°W
Cronelea Upper	1.8	2	Enercon	E-44	0.9			Wicklow	
Cronelea Upper	2.55	3	Vestas	V52	0.85		2005	Wicklow	
Cuillalea	3.4	4	Vestas	V52	0.85		2004	Mayo	53.8485°N 9.07122°W
Culliagh	12	18	Vestas	V47	0.66	SSE Renewables	2000	Donegal	54.8689°N 7.8899°W
Curragh	18	8	Siemens Gamesa	2.3VS	2.3	SSE Renewables	2009	Cork	52.0081°N 9.1111°W
Curraghgraigue Upper	5.1	6	Vestas	V52	0.85		2004	Tipperary	52.7969°N 8.1044°W
Cushaling	55	9	Vestas	V162	6.2	Statkraft	2024	Offaly	22 MW 4-hour battery
Derrybrien	60	70	Vestas	V52	0.85	ESBI	2006	Galway	53.0933°N 8.6060°W
Derrynadivva	8	10	Enercon	E-48	0.8		2009	Mayo	53.9104°N 9.3408°W
Derrysallagh	32	10	GE		3.2	Energia	2020	Sligo	54.0968°N 8.1908°W
Dromada	28.5	19	GE	1.5s	1.5	SSE Renewables	2010	Limerick	52.4462°N 9.2120°W
Dromadda Beg	10.2	3	Siemens Gamesa	SWT-3.4-101	3.4	Innogy	2018	Kerry	52.3309°N 9.4528°W
Drumlough	4.8	8	Windmaster		0.6	B9	1997	Donegal	55.2052°N 7.4474°W
Drybridge/Dunmore	1.7	2	Vestas	V52	0.85		2006	Louth	
Dundalk IT	0.85	1	Vestas	V52	0.85	DIT	2005	Louth	
Dunmore	1.8	2	Enercon	E-44	0.9		2009	Louth	
Dunneill	11.1	13			0.85	SSE Renewables	2010	Sligo	54.2098°N 8.8489°W
Esk	23.2	8	Nordex	N90	2.5	Invis Energy	2020	Cork	
Flughland	9.2	4	Enercon	E-70	2.3	Ørsted	2009	Donegal	55.1385°N 7.2691°W
Galway Wind Park	174	58	Siemens Gamesa	SWT-3-0-101	3	SSE Renewables; Greencoat Renewables	2017	Galway	53.3554°N 9.3698°W
Garracummer	42.5	17	Nordex	N90	2.5	Ørsted	2013	Tipperary	52.6437°N 8.1470°W
Gartnaneane	15	10	GE	1.5S	1.5	SSE Renewables	2004	Cavan	53.9458°N 6.9350°W
Garvagh Glebe	26	13	Vestas	V80	2	ESB	2010	Leitrim	54.1409°N 8.1938°W
Geevagh	5	6	Siemens Gamesa	G52	0.85	B9	2006	Sligo	54.1418°N 8.2676°W
Gibbet Hill	15	6	Nordex	N90	2.5		2013	Wexford	52.6744°N 6.5980°W
Glackmore	2.3	1	Enercon	E-70	2.3		2008	Donegal	55.1244°N 7.2731°W
Glenmore	34.2	12	Nordex	N90	2.5	Invis Energy	2019	Clare	
Glenough	35	14	Nordex	N80/N90	2.5	ABO Wind	2011	Tipperary	52.6419°N 8.055°W
Gneeves	9.4	11	Vestas	V52	0.85	Ørsted	2006	Cork	52.0127°N 9.1230°W
Gortahile	20	8	Nordex	N90	2.5	ABO Wind	2011	Laois	52.8147°N 7.0620°W
Grouselodge	15	6	Nordex	N90	2.5	ESB	2011	Limerick	52.5213°N 9.1028°W
Grousemount	114	38	Siemens Gamesa	SWT-3.4DD; SWT-2.3-82 VS	3.4; 2.3	ESB	2019	Kerry	51.8770°N 9.3310°W
Greenoge	7.7	5	Nordex	4 N60; 1 N90	1.3; 2.5	Greenoge Windfarm Ltd	2005	Carlow	52.6589°N 6.7280°W
Gusta Gaoithe	101	22	Nordex	N149	4 & 5	Invis Energy	2023	Galway	53.3484°N 9.3138°W
Hollyford	9	3	Siemens Gamesa	SWT-3.0-101	3	Energia	2014	Tipeperary	52.6465°N 8.0693°W
Inverin 1&2 (Knock South)	3.3	5	Vestas	V47	0.66		1999	Galway	53.2647°N 9.3697°W
Kealkill (Dismantled)	8.5	10	Siemens Gamesa	V52	0.85		2006	Cork	
Kilathmoy	23	7	Nordex	N100	3.3	Statkraft	2020	Limerick / Kerry	52.4909°N 9.3325°W
Kilgarvan	45	15	Vestas	V90	3	Ørsted	2007	Kerry	51.9341°N 9.3218°W
Kilgarvan II (Inchincoosh)	32.5	13	Nordex	N90	2.5	Ørsted	2009	Kerry	51.9367°N 9.3486°W
Killaveenoge	25	10	Nordex	N90	2.5	Invis Energy	2017	Cork	
Killybegs	13.8	6	Enercon	E-70	2.3		2008	Donegal	
Kilronan	5	10	Vestas	V39	0.5		1998	Roscommon	54.4306°N 8.8420°W
Kilvinane	4.5	3	Siemens Gamesa	G850	0.85		2006	Cork	
Kingsmountain	25	10	Nordex	N80	2.5	SSE Renewables	2003	Sligo	54.1989°N 8.7930°W
Knockacummer	100	40	Nordex	N90	2.5	Greencoat Renewables	2013	Cork	52.2594°N 9.1110°W
Knockalough	35.2	11	Nordex	N90	2.5	Invis Energy	2018	Galway	53.3066°N 9.2593°W
Knockastanna	6	4	GE	1.5	1.5	SSE Renewables	2009	Limerick	
Knockawarriga 1	22.5	9	Nordex	N90	2.5	Ørsted	2008	Limerick	
Knockawarriga 2	7.5	3			2.5	Ørsted	2020	Limerick	
Knockduff	65	26	Nordex	N90	2.5	Invis Energy	2016	Cork	52.0316°N 8.8300°W
Knocknagoum	44.4	26	Vestas	4 V90; 5 V90; 6 V80; 11 V52	2; 3; 2; 0.85	Invis Energy	2013	Kerry	
Lacka Cross	4.6	2	Enercon	E-82	2.3		2009	Kerry	
Lackan	6.9	3	Enercon	E-70	2.3		2006	Sligo	
Lahanaght Hill	4.25	5	Vestas	V52	0.85		2006	Cork	
Largan Hill	5.9	9	Vestas	V47	0.66	B9	2000	Roscommon	53.5645°N 8.3331°W
Leanamore	18	9			2	SSE Renewables	2018	Kerry	
Leitir Guingaid (LGLP)	23	10	Enercon	E82	2.3	Invis Energy	2014	Galway	
Leitir Peic (LGLP)	21	7	Enercon	E82	3	Invis Energy	2014	Galway	
Lenanavea	4.5	5	Enercon	E-44	0.9		2010	Mayo	53.9240°N 9.3505°W
Lisheen 1	36	18	Vestas	V90	2	Ørsted	2009	Tipperary	
Lisheen 2	24	12			2	Ørsted	2013	Tipperary	
Lisheen 3	28.8	8			3.6	Ørsted	2023	Tipperary	
Loughderryduff	7.65	9	Vestas	V52	0.85		2008	Donegal	
Lurganboy	5.4	6	Enercon	E-44	0.9		2008	Donegal	
Mace Upper	2.4	3	Enercon	E-48	0.8		2009	Mayo	53.7708°N 8.9697°W
Magheramore	43.2	16	Nordex	N90	2.5	Invis Energy	2019	Mayo	
Meenachullalan	13.8	6	Enercon	E70	2.3		2008	Donegal	
Meenadreen	3.4	4	Vestas	V52	0.85	B9	2003	Donegal	
Meenadreen II	95	38	Nordex	N90	2.5	Energia	2017	Donegal	
Meenanilta	2.55	3	Vestas	V52	0.85		2004	Donegal	
Meenanilta 3	3.2	4	Enercon	E-48	0.80		2004	Donegal	
Meentycat	88.2	45	Siemens Gamesa		2; 2.3	SSE Renewables	2004	Donegal	54.8646°N 7.8516°W
Meenwaun	11	4	GE	2.75-120	2.75	Stratkraft	2018	Offaly	
Midas	32.24	23	Vestas	V90; V52	3; 0.85		2007	Kerry	
Mienvee	0.9	1	Vestas	V52	0.85	Ørsted	2004	Tipperary	
Milane Hill	5.94	9	Vestas	V47	0.66	B9	2000	Cork	
Monaincha	36	15	Nordex	N117	2.4	Greencoat Renewables	2014	Tipperary	
Moanmore	14	7	Enercon	E-70 E4	2		2006	Clare	
Moneenatieve	4.25	2	Siemens Gamesa	G52	0.85	B9	2005	Leitrim	
Moneypoint	17.25	5	Vestas	V112	3.45	ESB	2017	Clare	
Mount Eagle	6.8	8	Vestas	V52	0.85	ESB	2005 & 2008	Kerry	
Mountlucas	84	28	Siemens Gamesa	3.0DD-101	3	Bord na Móna	2014	Offaly	53.2713°N 7.2360°W
Mountain Lodge	34.5	23	GE	1.5s	1.5	ESBI	2008	Cavan	
Mountain Lodge II	3	2	GE	1.5s	1.5	ESBI	2009	Cavan	
Mullananalt	7.5	5	GE	1.5s	1.5	SSE Renewables	2007	Monaghan	54.0769°N 6.9094°W
Muingnaminnane	14.8	18	Enercon	E-44; E-48	0.9; 0.8	Saorgus	2008	Kerry	
Oweninny	192	60	Siemens Gamesa Nordex	SWT-3.2-113 N117/3600	3.2 3.6	ESB; Bord na Móna	2023	Mayo	54.1514°N 9.5495°W
Pallas	40	20	Enercon	E-70	2.0	Pallas Wind Farms Ltd	2008	Kerry	
Raheen Barr	18.7	22	Vestas	V52	0.85		2003	Mayo	53.8993°N 9.3544°W
Raheenleagh	35.2	11	Siemens Gamesa	108-DD	3.2	ESB; Coillte	2016	Wicklow	
Rahora	4	5	Enercon	E-48	0.8		2008	Cork	
Raragh	12	5				Mainstream Renewable Power	2019	Cavan	53.9259°N 6.8241°W
Rathcahill	12.5	5			2.5	SSE Renewables	2011	Limerick	
Rathmooney	0.8	1	Enercon	E-48	0.8		2009	Dublin	53.5499°N 6.1751°W
Reenascreena	4.0	5	Enercon	E-48	0.8		2009	Cork	
Richfield	27	18	GE	1.5s	1.5	SSE Renewables	2006	Wexford	52.2153°N 6.5910°W
Seltannaveeny	4.6	2	Enercon	E-70	2.3		2010	Leitrim	
Shannagh	2.7	3	Enercon	E-44	0.9		2009	Donegal	
Sheeragh	4.6	2	Enercon	E-70	2.3		2008	Donegal	
Sillahertane	8.5	10			0.85	Ørsted	2009	Kerry	
Skehanagh	4.25	5	Vestas	V52	0.85		2006	Tipperary	
Skrine	4.6	2	Enercon	E-70	2.3		2011	Roscommon	
Sliabh Bawn	64	20	Siemens Gamesa	SWT-3.2-101	3.2	Bord na Móna; Coillte	2017	Roscommon	
Slievecallan West	45	18	Nordex	N90	2.5	Invis Energy	2017	Clare	
Smithstown	8	4			2	Ørsted	2013	Kilkenny	
Snugborough	13.5	9	GE	1.5s	1.5		2003	Louth	
Sonnagh Old	7.65	9	Vestas	V52	0.85		2004	Galway	53.1309°N 8.6391°W
Sorne Hill 1	32	16	Enercon	E-70	2	Ørsted	2006	Donegal	
Sorne Hill 2	6.9	3			2.3	Ørsted	2009	Donegal	
Spion Kop	1.2	2	Vestas	V42	0.6		1997	Leitrim	
Slievereagh	2.3	1	Enercon	E-70	2.3		2009	Limerick	
Taurbeg	25.3	11	Siemens Gamesa	SWT-2.3	2.3	B9	2006	Cork	
Teevurcher	10.25	5	Senvion	MM82	2.05	NTR	2018	Meath	53.8857°N 6.9160°W
Tournafulla	27	18	GE	1.5s	1.5	SSE Renewables	2007	Limerick	
Tullahennel	37	13	GE			26 MW Statkraft battery	2019	Kerry	
Tullynahaw	22	11	Vestas	V80	2	ESB	2010	Roscommon	
Tullynamoyle	9.2	4	Enercon	E-70	2.3	Tullynamoyle Wind Farm Limited	2011	Leitrim	
Tursillagh/1	15.8	23	Vestas	V47	0.66	Saorgus	2000	Kerry	52.3144°N 9.5975°W
Tursillagh/2	6.8	8	Vestas	V52	0.85	Saorgus	2004	Kerry	52.3144°N 9.5975°W
Woodhouse	20	8	Nordex	5 N100; 3 N90	2.5	ESB	2015	Waterford	

=== Decommissioned ===
Wind farm	Capacity (MW)	No.	Turbine vendor	Model	Size (MW)	Operator	Operational	County	Coordinates
Bellacorick	6.45	21	Nordtank	NTK300	0.3	Bord na Móna	1992 — 2025	Mayo	54.1125°N 9.5870°W

=== Offshore ===
Wind farm	Capacity (MW)	No.	Turbine vendor	Model	Size (MW)	Operator	Completed	County	Coordinates
Arklow Bank	25	7	GE	3.6xl	3.6	SSE Renewables	2004	Wicklow	52.789°N 5.949°W

== Proposed ==
=== Onshore ===
Wind farm	Capacity (MW)	No.	Turbine vendor	Model	Size (MW)	Developer	Proposed	County	Coordinates	Notes
Ballinagree	125.4					Ørsted; FuturEnergy Ireland	2026	Cork		
Cloghercor	125.4					Ørsted; FuturEnergy Ireland	2027	Donegal		
Coole	50	13				Statkraft		Westmeath		
Coom Green Energy Park	105.6					Ørsted; FuturEnergy Ireland	2027	Cork		
Cummennabuddoge	114	19				SSE Renewables; FuturEnergy Ireland	2027	Kerry		
Gortyrahilly	90	15				SSE Renewables; FuturEnergy Ireland		Cork		
Inchamore	36	6				SSE Renewables; FuturEnergy Ireland		Cork		
Mount Callan	90	30			3.0	West Clare Renewable Energy		Clare		
Shragh	135	45	Enercon	E82	3.0	Clare Coastal Wind Power Ltd		Clare		

=== Offshore ===
Wind farm	Capacity (MW)	No.	Turbine vendor	Model	Size (MW)	Developer	Proposed	County	Coordinates	Notes
Arklow Bank 2	800	36 - 60				SSE Renewables	2029	Wicklow	52.7907°N 5.9474°W	A Maritime Area Consent (MAC) which grants seabed rights was granted in December 2022.
Clarus Offshore Wind Farm	1,000	70			15	DP Energy; Iberdrola	2030	Clare; Kerry	52.6373°N 10.6801°W	
Codling	1,300	100				Fred Olsen Seawind; EDF Renewables	2025 - 2027	Wicklow	53.0680°N 5.7774°W	Winning bid in ORESS-1
Dublin Array	600 - 900	45 - 61				RWE; Saorgus	2028	Dublin	53.2665°N 5.9718°W	Winning bid in ORESS-1
Inis Ealga Marine Energy Park	1,000	70				DP Energy; Iberdrola	2030	Cork; Waterford	51.5371°N 7.5504°W	
North Irish Sea Array	500	35 - 46				Statkraft		Dublin; Meath; Louth	53.6817°N 5.8111°W	Winning bid in ORESS-1
Oriel Wind Farm	330 (Note: If completed as per the 2007 proposals, the Oriel Wind Farm would reportedly be capable of generating up to 330 megawatts of electricity. The generated electricity could be fed into the Irish national electrical grid, with some of the output exported via interconnector to the UK and European energy markets.)	55				Oriel Windfarm Ltd (Note: The proposed development takes its name from the ancient Kingdom of Oriel.)		Louth	53.9230°N 6.0596°W	According to a 2007 press release, the Oriel Wind Farm is proposed to be located in the Irish Sea near Clogherhead. Ecological and geotechnical assessments were commenced in 2007, and a planning application was submitted in mid-2024. Planners requested "extra information" in August 2025, with developers given "until next January [2026] to respond". Not included in ORESS-1.
Shelmalere Offshore Wind Farm	1,000	70			15	DP Energy; Iberdrola	2030	Wicklow; Wexford	52.3892°N 6.0851°W	
Skerd Rocks	450					Fuinneamh Sceirde Teoranta	2030	Galway	53.2665°N 9.9845°W	Winning bid in ORESS-1

== See also ==
- List of wind farms
- Renewable energy
- Wind power in the Republic of Ireland
- List of solar farms in the Republic of Ireland
