= Wind power in Ireland =

National occurrence of wind power

Locations of wind farms on and around the island of Ireland

As of 2021, the island of Ireland had 5,585 MW of installed wind power capacity, with 4,309 MW in the Republic of Ireland. In 2020, wind provided over 86% of Ireland's renewable electricity and generated 36.3% of Ireland's electricity demand, one of the highest percentages globally. In 2023, Wind Energy Ireland confirmed that wind farms provided 35 per cent of Ireland and Northern Ireland's electricity in 2023, totalling a record breaking 13,725 gigawatt-hours (GWh). Ireland has over 300 wind farms, mostly onshore. A Public Service Obligation subsidy supports renewable energy and wind power development, driven by concerns over energy, security, and climate change mitigation.

== Capacity Growth ==
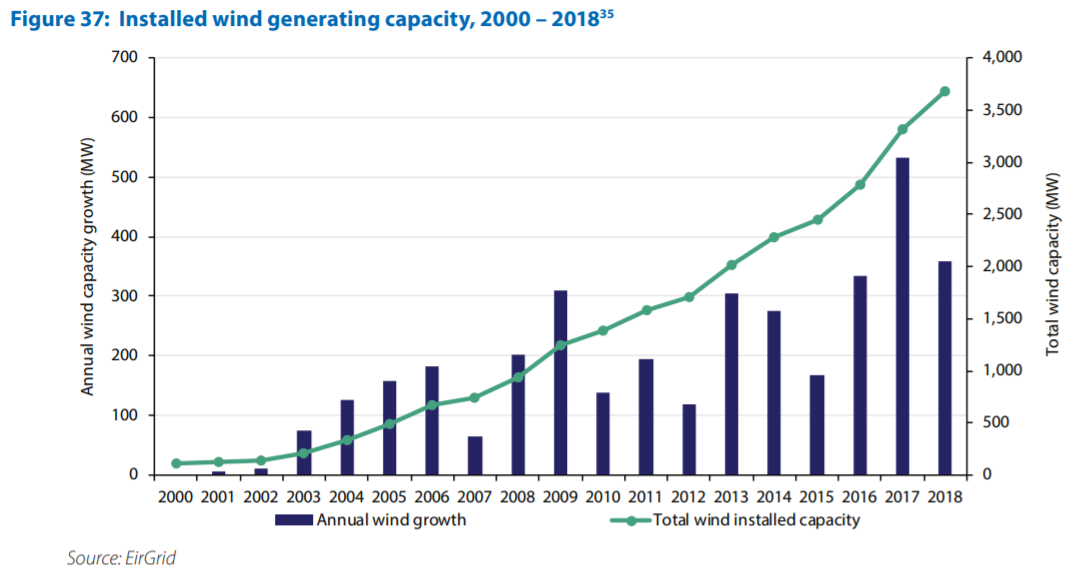
Figure 1: A graph of the wind power generation capacity of the Republic of Ireland from 2000 to 2018, Graph source: SEAI Electricity in Ireland Report, 2019, Data source: Eirgrid

Eddie O'Connor, then CEO of the semi-state owned peat harvesting company, Bord na Móna, commissioned the country's first "commercial wind farm" in a cutaway peat bog in County Mayo in 1992. Wind power deployment in the Republic of Ireland began slowly during the 1990s but has accelerated in the 2000s. Whilst annual wind capacity growth has been variable, it has shown an increasing trend (Figure 1). Wind power has provided a steadily increasing share of electricity, from 4% (1,874 GWh) in 2005, to 28% in 2018 (10,195 GWh) (Figure 2). In the first two months of 2020, wind provided 49% of electricity demand, and a peak recorded output from wind power of 4,471 MW was delivered on 12 February 2021. Wind is now the second largest source of electricity generation after natural gas, which accounted for 52% of electricity generated in 2018.

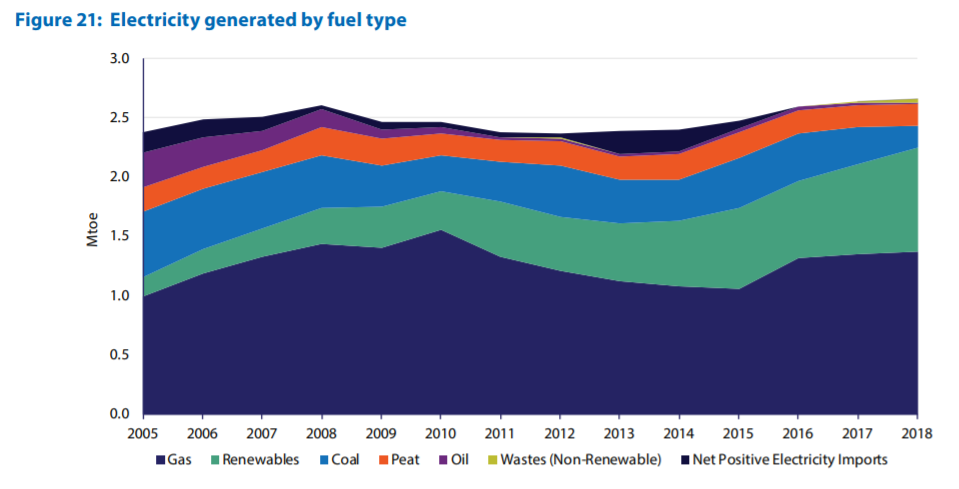
Figure 2: Electricity generated by fuel type in the Republic of Ireland in million tonnes of oil equivalent (Mtoe), Graph source: SEAI Electricity in Ireland Report, 2019 Datasource: Eirgrid

Wind power installed capacity and generation in Ireland

== Drivers of wind power expansion ==
Concerns over energy security (Ireland has an estimated 15.4m tonnes of coal reserves, peat bogs, offshore oil and gas fields, and has extensive wind resources), climate change mitigation policies, and compliance with EU Directives for market liberalization, have all shaped wind power development in Ireland.

In the Directive 2001/77/EC, otherwise known as the RES-E Directive, the European Union stated a goal to have 22% of the total energy consumed by member states to be produced from renewable energy resources by 2010. As a result, Ireland, in a report titled "Policy Consideration for Renewable Electricity to 2010", made the commitment to have 4% of its total energy consumption come from renewable energy resources by 2002 and 13.2% by 2010. The Department of Communications Marine and Natural Resources (DCMNR) founded the Renewable Energy Group (REG) which established the short-term analysis group (STAG) to investigate a means of accomplishing this goal. To meet the 2010 target of 13.2%, 1,432 MW of electricity will need to be generated from renewable resources with 1,100 MW being generated from wind resources both onshore and offshore.

== State financial support ==
State financial support for the national electricity sector, and particular technologies, has been influenced by a slow move towards liberalization, and concerns for energy security and climate change mitigation. Ireland uses an industry subsidy known as the Public Service Obligation (PSO) to support the generation of electricity from sustainable, renewable and indigenous sources, including wind. The PSO levy is charged to all electricity customers. As of April 2020, for residential consumers, the current PSO levy is €38.68 per year inclusive of value-added tax (VAT), and is displayed on the typical two-monthly electricity bill as €5.68 (€2.84 × 2) + 13.5% VAT.

The PSO levy funds the government's main mechanisms to support the generation of electricity from sustainable, renewable and indigenous sources. These mechanisms have shifted from the initial use of competitive auctions in the late 1990s, to a renewable energy feed-in tariff (REFiT) from 2006 to 2015, and back to a new renewable energy auction scheme as of 2020. Ireland's initial use of competitive auction from 1996 failed to support the intended growth in wind development. Between 2006 and 2015, the government supported a REFiT, secured for 15 years. The 2020 REFiT reference price for large wind (>5 MW) is €70.98 /MWh and for small wind (<5 MW) is €73.47/MWh. In June 2020, Ireland will run its first competitive renewable energy auction under the government's new Renewable Energy Support Scheme (RESS-1). RESS-1 support is structured as a two-way floating feed-in premium (FIP), roughly the difference between the 'strike price' set in the successful auction bid and the 'market reference price'. When costs of electricity suppliers exceed market revenues a Support Payment will be due to the supplier, and when market revenues exceed costs a Difference Payment will be due from the supplier. An economic analysis of the financial cost of different RESS options, estimated that a least cost auction with floating FIP mechanism would cost a domestic consumer €0.79 per month by 2030 (at 2017 prices). This is significantly less than the current PSO levy rate to fund REFiT costs.

== Offshore wind power ==
The Arklow Bank Wind Park, located 10 km off the coast of Arklow on the Arklow Bank in the Irish Sea, is Ireland's only offshore wind farm. The wind farm is owned and built by GE Energy and was co-developed by Airtricity and GE Energy. The site has 7 GE Energy 3.6 MW turbines that generate a total of 25 MW. The development of the site was originally divided into two phases with the first phase being the current installation of 7 turbines. The second phase was a partnership between Airtricity and Acciona Energy. Acciona Energy had an option to buy the project after the facility is completed. The wind farm was planned to expand to 520 MW of power. However, Phase 2 was cancelled in 2007.

Although the waters off the Atlantic coast of Ireland have higher winds, sites along the eastern coast, such as Arklow, have been chosen for their shallower waters, with depths of 20m or less.

In Belfast, the harbor industry is being redeveloped as a hub for offshore wind farm construction, at a cost of about £50m. The work will create 150 jobs in construction, as well as requiring about 1 million tonnes of stone from local quarries, which will create hundreds more jobs. "It is the first dedicated harbor upgrade for offshore wind".

In 2023, an offshore wind auction approved four projects totaling 3 GW. The Codling project won first approval for a power price around €90/MWh by 2027.

== Current trends ==
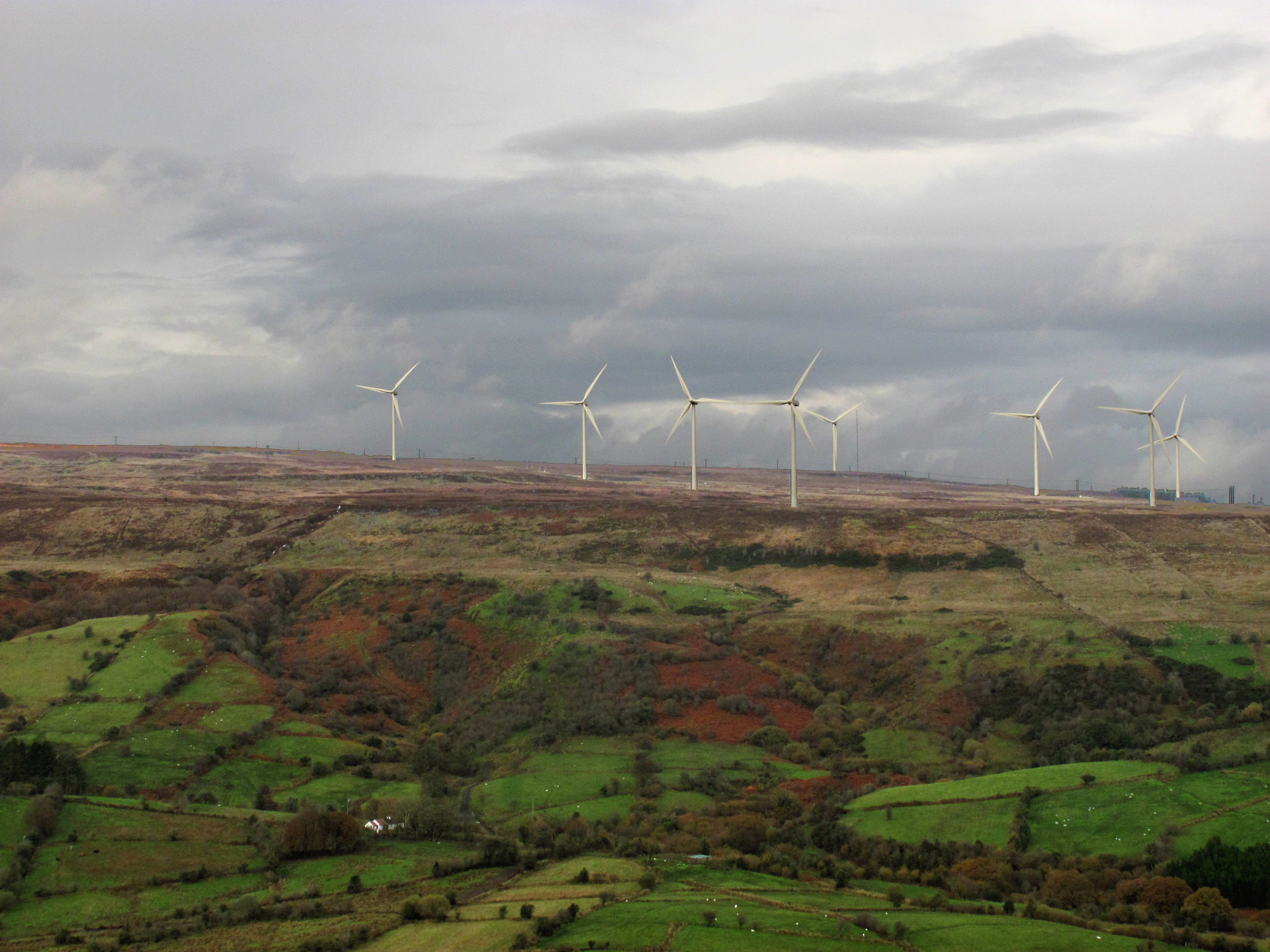
Wind turbines on County Leitrim's Corrie Mountain, where a peat slide occurred in 2008.

Grid connections are currently allocated on a 'first come, first served' basis through the Gate 3 procedures. Upon reviewing the Gate 3 queue, it was noted that several large onshore and offshore wind projects are positioned lower in the queue, meaning they will likely be offered grid connections towards the end of the anticipated 18-month processing period, which began in December 2009.

Under normal circumstances, planning permission expires after 5 years. However, Section 41 of the Planning and Development Act 2000 allows for an extended period. It is currently common to apply for and obtain a 10-year permission for wind energy developments. Section 42 of the same Act initially permitted a 5-year extension of the "appropriate period," provided that substantial works were carried out. This led to issues, as the term "substantial works" was not clearly defined, resulting in varied interpretations among planning authorities. This problem was addressed by the Planning and Development (Amendment) Act 2010, which introduced Section 28, allowing a one-off extension of up to 5 years if "there were considerations of a commercial, economic, or technical nature beyond the control of the applicant, which substantially militated against either the commencement of development or the carrying out of substantial works pursuant to the planning permission."

The fourth issue regarding the generation of wind power is the Renewable Energy Feed-in Tariff, or REFIT. REFIT's goal is to promote the development of renewable energy sources. For wind power production, the current limit to the tariff is 1,450 MW. However, applications currently being processed for grid connections exceed the limit by almost 1,500 MW for a total for nearly 3,000 MW. Since the limit is 1,450 MW, many of the applications for grid connections are most likely not eligible for the tariff.

== 5 largest onshore wind farms ==
Wind Farm	Capacity (MW)	No.	Turbine Vendor	Model	Size (MW)	Operator	Completed	County
Oweninny	192	60	Siemens Gamesa; Enercon	SWT-3.2–113; N117/3600	3.2; 3.6	ESB; Bord na Móna	2023	Mayo
Galway Wind Park	174	58	Siemens Gamesa	SWT-3.0–101	3.0	SSE Renewables & Coillte	2017	Galway
Grousemount	114	38	Siemens Gamesa	SWT-3.2–108; SWT-2.3–93	3.2; 2.3	ESB	2020	Kerry
Gusta Gaoithe	101	22	Nordex	N149	4.0; 5.0	Invis Energy	2023	Galway
Knockacummer	100	40	Nordex	N90	2.5	Greencoat Renewables	2013	Cork

== Controversy ==
=== Economy ===
In 2011, the 120-member Irish Academy of Engineering described wind as "an extremely expensive way of reducing greenhouse gas emissions when compared to other alternatives" like conservation, nuclear energy or the Corrib gas project and Liquified Gas tanker imports at Shannon, concluding that the suggestion of 40% grid penetration by wind, is "unrealistic". In 2020, grid penetration had hit 36.3% and was still increasing but slowly. By contrast, the Sustainable Energy Authority of Ireland said in 2014 that wind power cost the same as gas power. In 2020 the Irish Times reported that the cost of onshore wind energy had dropped over the last 20 years but that regulation on noise and height of turbines made Irish wind energy more expensive than elsewhere.

=== Peatlands and bog landslides ===
Building wind turbines and access roads on top of peatland results in the drainage and then eventual oxidation of some of the peat. The turbines represent a minor impact, provided that the entire wind farm area is not drained, potentially emitting more carbon dioxide (CO_{2}) than the turbines would save. Biochemist Mike Hall said in 2009; "wind farms (built on peat bogs) may eventually emit more carbon than an equivalent coal-fired power station" if drained.

A 2014 report for the Northern Ireland Environment Agency, which has similar peatland, notes that building wind turbines on peatland could release considerable carbon dioxide from the peat, weaken flood control, and spoil water quality: "The potential knock-on effects of using the peatland resource for wind turbines are considerable and it is arguable that the impacts on this facet of biodiversity will have the most noticeable and greatest financial implications for Northern Ireland."

The Irish Peatland Conservation Council maintains a database on incidents where building wind turbines (and wind farms) on or near peatland caused devastating landslides, called "bog bursts"/"peat flows". These accelerate the release of carbon dioxide into the atmosphere.

In October 2003, the building of a wind farm in County Galway caused the Derrybrien landslide, an almost 2.5 km long, 450,000 m^{3} bog landslide, polluting a nearby lake and killing 50,000 fish. The lake was also the source of the town of Gort's drinking water. If all carbon in the slide is being released, it represents 7–15 months of production from the wind farm in avoided carbon dioxide from fossil power. In 2004, engineering companies were convicted of being responsible for the pollution, while the wind farm company was acquitted. The Irish government was convicted in 2008 of poor oversight.

Following the Corrie Mountain bog burst of 2008, Ireland was fined by a European Court over its mishandling of wind farms on peatland. By 2010, there had been at least three major bog landslides related to wind farms in Ireland.

In 2020, there was another large bog landslide at a wind farm construction site at Meenbog, County Donegal. This polluted rivers that are protected Atlantic salmon habitats, and was predicted to have caused a "complete fish kill". Drinking water supplies linked to the rivers had to be suspended.

The body representing industrial peat harvesting in Ireland, Bord na Móna, announced in 2015 the "biggest change of land use in modern Irish history": harvesting peat is being phased out by 2030, due to the long-expected depletion of profitable lowland peat, at which point the company would complete its transition to becoming a "sustainable biomass, wind and solar power" organization.

=== Local opposition ===
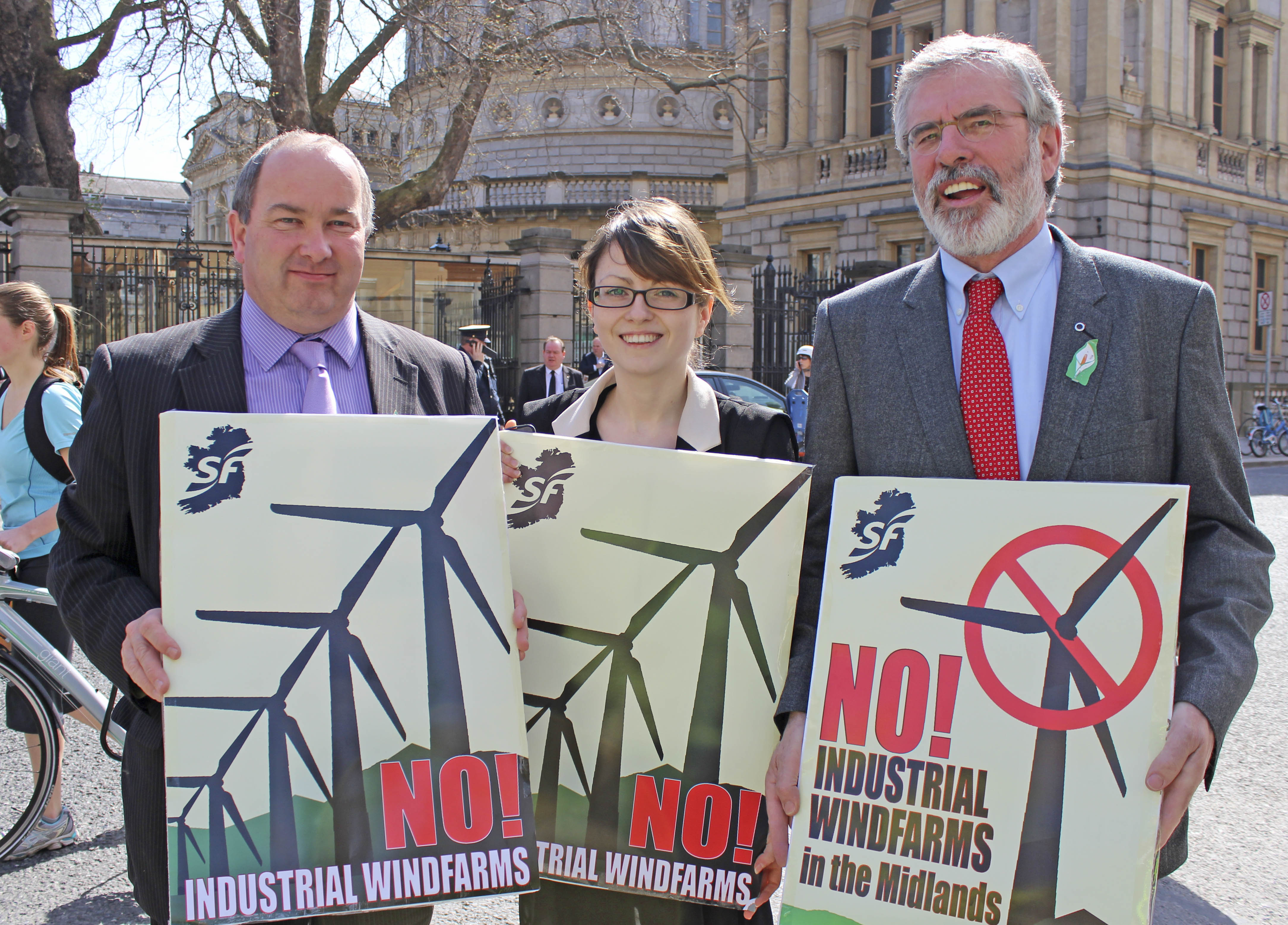
Sinn Féin politicians protesting against the proposed Midlands wind farms in 2014

Some on-land wind farms in Ireland have been opposed by local residents, county councils, the Heritage Council and An Taisce (The National Trust) for their potential to blight the landscape, and having a harmful impact on protected scenic areas, archaeological landscapes, tourism and cultural heritage. In 2014, more than 100 protest groups united against government plans to build thousands of wind turbines in the Midlands to export energy to Britain. Among other things, they argued the wind farms would ruin the landscape and mainly benefit "multinational corporations who are sucking subsidies from the UK taxpayers". The Irish government shelved the plans.

In 2021, a proposed wind farm at Kilranelagh in the Wicklow Mountains was refused as it would have harmed the area's archaeological landscape, which includes the Baltinglass hillfort complex.

An application to build a wind farm overlooking the scenic valley of Gougane Barra was refused by Cork County Council, who voted unanimously against it. The company appealed to An Bord Pleanála, whose inspector also rejected it, stating it "would have significant adverse environmental and visual impacts and is not sustainable at this highly sensitive location". Despite this, An Bord Pleanála granted permission, on the grounds that the wind farm would contribute "to the implementation of Ireland's national strategic policy on renewable energy". The spokesman of the campaigners against the wind farm said the decision was undemocratic, as the local people and council opposed it.

== Environmental Impact and Greenhouse gases ==
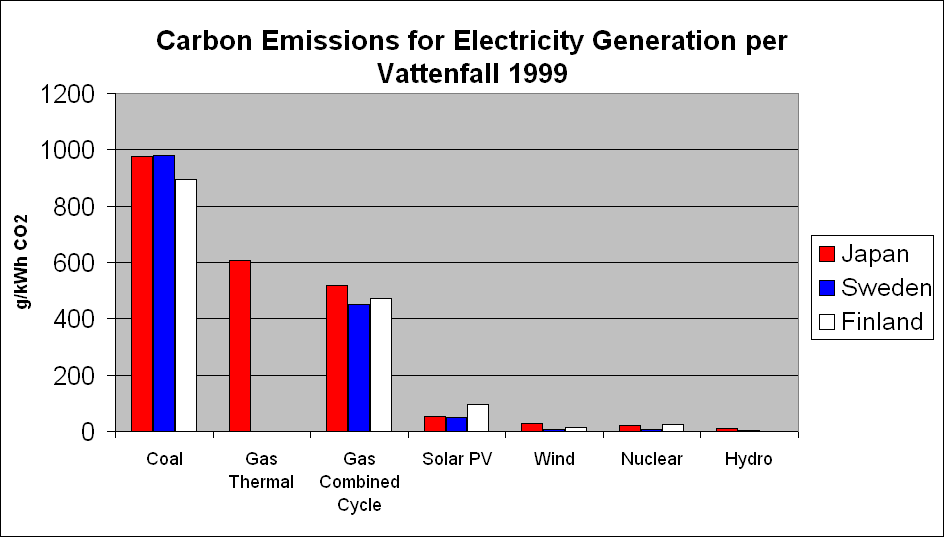
Studies by the Vattenfall electricity company found; electricity generation by Hydroelectric, nuclear stations and wind turbines in-isolation, to all have a far smaller embodied carbon footprint than other sources represented. These studies on the total life-cycle, greenhouse gas emissions, per unit of energy generated take into account the Nordic utilities cradle-to-grave construction emissions etc. These results are largely in-line with those made in 2014 by the Intergovernmental Panel on Climate Change. However they do not assess real-world integrated grid findings and the actual pollution emitted from the addition of wind energy into an electric grid.

In a typical study of a wind farms Life cycle assessment (LCA), in isolation, it usually results in similar findings as the following 2006 analysis of 3 installations in the US Midwest, were the carbon dioxide (CO_{2}) emissions of wind power ranged from 14 to 33 metric ton per GWh (14 – 33 g CO_{2}/kWh) of energy produced, with most of the CO_{2} emissions coming from the production of concrete for wind-turbine foundations.

However, when approached from the effects on the grid as a whole, that assess wind turbines' ability to reduce a country's total electric grid emission intensity, a study by the Irish national grid, a grid that is predominately (~70%) powered by fossil gas, (and if it was 100% gas, would result in emissions of 410 – 650 g CO_{2}/kWh.) found that "Producing electricity from wind reduces the consumption of fossil fuels and therefore leads to [electric grid] emissions savings", with findings in reductions of the grid-wide CO_{2} emissions to 0.33–0.59 metric ton of CO_{2} per MWh (330 – 590 g CO_{2}/kWh).

These findings were of relatively "low [emission] savings", as presented in the Journal of Energy Policy, and were largely due to an over-reliance on the results from the analysis of wind farms LCAs in isolation. As high electric grid penetration by intermittent power sources e.g. wind power, sources which have low capacity factors due to the weather, either requires the construction of transmission to neighbouring areas, energy storage projects like the 292 MW Turlough Hill Power Station, that have their own additional emission intensity which must be accounted for, or the more common practice of requiring a higher reliance on fossil fuels than the spinning reserve requirements necessary to back-up the more dependable/baseload power sources, such as hydropower and nuclear energy.

This higher dependence on back-up/Load following power plants to ensure a steady power grid output has the knock-on-effect of more frequent inefficient (in CO_{2}e g/kW·h) throttling up and down of these other power sources in the grid to accommodate the intermittent power source's variable output. When one includes the intermittent sources total effect it has on other power sources in the grid system, that is, including these inefficient start up emissions of backup power sources to cater for wind energy, into wind energy's total system wide life cycle, this results in a higher real-world emission intensity related to wind energy than the in-isolation g/kW·h value, a statistic that is determined by looking at the power source in isolation and thus ignores all down-stream detrimental/inefficiency effects it has on the grid. In a 2012 paper that appeared in the Journal of Industrial Ecology it states.

The thermal efficiency of fossil-based power plants is reduced when operated at fluctuating and suboptimal loads to supplement wind power, which may degrade, to a certain extent, the GHG (Greenhouse gas) benefits resulting from the addition of wind to the grid. A study conducted by Pehnt and colleagues (2008) reports that a moderate level of [grid] wind penetration (12%) would result in efficiency penalties of 3% to 8%, depending on the type of conventional power plant considered. Gross and colleagues (2006) report similar results, with efficiency penalties ranging from nearly 0% to 7% for up to 20% [of grid] wind penetration. Pehnt and colleagues (2008) conclude that the results of adding offshore wind power in Germany on the background power systems maintaining a level supply to the grid and providing enough reserve capacity amount to adding between 20 and 80 g CO_{2}-eq/kWh to the life cycle GHG emissions profile of wind power.

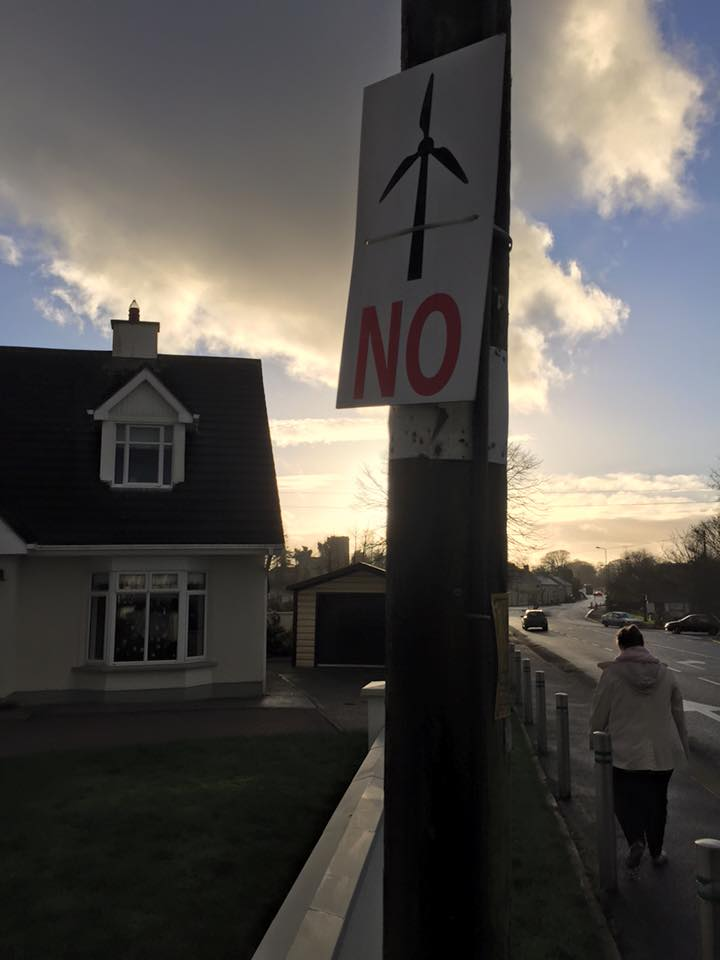
Anti Wind Farm poster in Rochfortbridge, County Westmeath in 2014

According to the IPCC, wind turbines when assessed in isolation, have a median life cycle emission value of between 12 and 11 (gCO_{2}eq/kWh). While the more dependable alpine Hydro power and nuclear stations have median total life cycle emission values of 24 and 12 g CO_{2}-eq/kWh respectively.

Regarding interconnections, Ireland is connected to adjacent UK National Grid at an electricity interconnection level (transmission capacity relative to production capacity) of 9%. The two grids have a high wind correlation of 0.61, whereas the wind correlation between the Irish grid and the Danish grid is low at 0.09.

=== Tourism ===
A significant feature of wind farms in Ireland is their ability to attract both local and tourists.. The Bord na Mona wind farm in Mount Lucas, Daingean, Co.Offaly has provided a local walk way through the newly established wind farm that attracts people of all ages. The walk way provides a safe environment off-road for walking, running and cycling. The walk way is approximately nine kilometres in distance with numerous stop off points for breaks. Maps can also be located in a variety of locations on the walk for guidance around the wind farm and back to allocated car parks. The walk way also provides aesthetic scenery on a relatively flat landscape. Such a walk attracts many people year round and circulates money back into the local community as tourists stop off in local shops.

=== Grid study in Ireland ===
A 2008 Irish study of the grid indicates that it would be feasible to accommodate 42% (of demand) renewables in the electricity mix. This acceptable level of renewable penetration was found in what the study called Scenario 5, provided 47% of electrical capacity (different from demand) with the following mix of renewable energies:

- 6,000 MW wind
- 360 MW base load renewables
- 285 MW additional variable renewables (other intermittent sources)

The study cautions that various assumptions were made that "may have understated dispatch restrictions, resulting in an underestimation of operational costs, required wind curtailment, and CO_{2} emissions" and that "The limitations of the study may overstate the technical feasibility of the portfolios analyzed..."

Scenario 6, which proposed renewables providing 59% of electrical capacity and 54% of demand had problems. Scenario 6 proposed the following mix of renewable energies:

- 8,000 MW wind
- 392 MW base load renewables
- 1,685 MW additional variable renewables (other intermittent sources)

The study found that, for Scenario 6, "a significant number of hours characterized by extreme system situations occurred, where load and reserve requirements could not be met." The results of the network study suggested that, for scenarios with extreme renewable penetration, a system redesign would be necessary, rather than merely reinforcing the existing system. The study chose not to analyze the cost-effectiveness of the required changes, stating that "determination of costs and benefits had become extremely dependent on the assumptions made," and that this uncertainty could have impacted the robustness of the results.

== See also ==
- List of wind farms
- List of offshore wind farms in the Irish Sea
- Renewable energy in the Republic of Ireland
- Renewable energy
- Wind turbine
- Nuclear energy in Ireland
- Renewable energy by country
