= Galway Wind Park =

Irish wind farm

- Country: Ireland
- Location: Cloosh Valley, County Galway
- Coordinates: 53.3662°N 9.3676°W
- Status: Operational
- Construction began: 2015 (Phase 1); 2016 (Phase 2)
- Commission date: September 2017
- Construction cost: €280 Million
- Owners: SSE Renewables; Greencoat Renewables
- Operator: SSE Renewables

Wind farm
- Type: Onshore
- Site usage: Wilderness
- Rotor diameter: 101 m 331 ft
- Site elevation: 125 m (410 ft); 235 m (771 ft)

Power generation
- Units operational: 58 x 3 MW
- Make and model: Siemens SWT-3.0-101
- Nameplate capacity: 174 MW

External links
- Website: www.sserenewables.com/onshore-wind/ireland/galway-wind-park/

Galway Wind Park is one of Ireland's largest onshore wind farms. Located in Connemara's Cloosh Valley west of Moycullen, County Galway. The wind park was co-developed by SSE Renewables and Coillte at a cost of €280 million and consists of 58 Siemens 3 MW SWT-3.0-101 wind turbines. The wind park provides energy to around 89,000 homes, which is equivalent to 80% of the homes in Galway.

== Development ==
The project was developed over two phases and includes four permitted wind farms which are Galway Cloosh, Lettercraffroe, Seecon and Uggool. Phase one of the project consists of 22 turbines located on the Uggool and Lettercraffroe sites and began construction in 2015. It was developed and financed solely by SSE Renewables and consists of 22 turbines. Phase two was developed and financed through a joint venture between SSE Renewables and Coillte. The second phase consists of 36 turbines located at the Cloosh and Seecon sites.

The Port of Galway was used in the development of the wind park, and turbine tops, hubs and blades were offloaded in the port and transported to the site by trucks during the night. The 55 metres (180 ft) long blades were among some of the largest in the industry at the time of construction and a section of the Lough Atalia Road which passed under the rail bridge had to be lowered in order to facilitate the transportation of the turbine blades.

Generated electricity is sent to the nearby Uggool substation where the voltage is increased to 110kV. An underground power cable joins the Galway-Screeb 110kV overhead line and connects the wind park with the electrical grid.

Upon its completion in 2016, it was Ireland's largest onshore wind farm, remaining so until 2024 when it was overtaken by the second phase of the 194 MW Oweninny Wind Farm.

== See also ==
- Wind power in Ireland
- List of wind farms in the Republic of Ireland
