= De Aar Solar Power =

Photovoltaic power station in Northern Cape, South Africa

- Country: South Africa
- Location: De Aar, Northern Cape Province
- Coordinates: 30°37′30″S 24°1′46″E
- Status: Operational
- Commission date: 2014
- Operator: Globeleq

Solar farm
- Type: Standard PV

Power generation
- Nameplate capacity: 48 MW_{p}
- Annual net output: 89.4 GWh

De Aar Solar Power is located 6 km outside the town of De Aar in the Northern Cape Province of South Africa. The facility is based on over 100 hectares of Emathanjeni Municipal land, and comprises 167,580 solar (PV) panels. De Aar Solar Power supplies Eskom with 85,458 MWh of renewable electrical energy per year; enough to power more than 19 000 average South African households.

De Aar Solar Power signed a 20-year power purchase agreement with Eskom as part of the South African Government's Renewable Energy Independent Power Producer Procurement Programme (REIPPP) and was one of the first solar power projects in South Africa. The project also has an Implementation Agreement with the South African Department of Energy.

The project received full Environmental Authorisation from the Department of Environmental Affairs in 2011.

== Background ==
Mainstream Renewable Energy was responsible for the construction management of the De Aar solar facility, which took place between December 2012 and mid-2014.

De Aar Solar Power is owned by a consortium comprising Globeleq, Thebe Investment Corporation, Mainstream Renewable Power, the Sibona Ilanga Trust, Enzani Technologies and Usizo Engineering. Globeleq and Siemens Energy Sector jointly manage the project.

== Solar panels ==
The 167 580 Suntech STP 290/295 Watt solar panels at De Aar Solar Power each have a capacity of 290 and 295 watts and measure 1 x 2m. The inverters used at this facility are SINVERT PVS2400.

== Local community ==
Benefits for the local community arising from the construction and operation of De Aar Solar include a number of enterprise development and socio-economic development programmes, as well as local procurement and employment opportunities.

Some of the projects supported include Foundation for Alcohol Related Research, Early Childhood Development, Reading Coach Programme, Telematics Programme, Gentle Care Centre, and an engineering scholarship fund.

== See also ==
- List of power stations in South Africa
- Solar power
- Environmental impact of solar power
- Sustainable energy
