= List of solar farms in the Republic of Ireland =

List of solar farms

This is a list of solar farms in the Republic of Ireland.

The list includes farms that have been proposed, are in development or construction phase, or have been completed and are operating and connected to the grid.

Solar farm	Size (MW)	Developer(s)	Operator	Completed (Year)	County	Coordinates	Notes
Gallanstown	198	JBM Solar; Lightsource; Statkraft	Octopus Renewables Infrastructure Trust	2022	Meath		
Clonfad	175	JBM Solar; Statkraft			Westmeath		
Garrenleen	160	Ørsted			Carlow		
Garr	141	Neoen			Offaly		
Lysaghtstown	131	Terra Solar; Power Capital Renewable Energy	Voltalia		Cork		
Ballyroe	120	Soleire Renewable SPV			Cork		
Swordleton	120	Strategic Power Projects Limited			Kildare		
Milltown	120	ESB Group			Meath		
Rathnaskilloge	114	Highfield Solar			Waterford		
Timahoe	108	Bord na Móna/ESB			Kildare		
Tracystown	101	ESB Group			Wexford		
Ballymoneen	100	Ballymoneen Project Limited			Galway		
Garballagh	95	Highfield Solar			Meath		
Rosspile	95	Highfield Solar			Wexford		
Gaskinstown	93	Highfield Solar IB Vogt			Meath		
East Laois	93	Lightsource			Laois		
Tullabeg	82	Power Capital Renewable Energy			Wexford		
Taduff, Drum and Curraghaleen	75	EDF Renewables Ireland			Roscommon		
Ballinrea	55	Orsted			Cork		
Ballinknockane	61	Neoen			Limerick		
Ballymacarney	54	Statkraft	Octopus Renewables Infrastructure Trust		Meath		
Blundlestown	52	Statkraft			Dublin		Acquired from Lightsource in 2020
Harristown	42.3	Lightsource Statkraft			Meath		
Blusheens	7.8	EDF Renewables Ireland			Wexford		
Coolroe	5	EDF Renewables Ireland			Wexford		
Curraghmartin	3.99	EDF Renewables Ireland			Wexford		

== See also ==
- List of wind farms in the Republic of Ireland
