= Bindoo =

Townland in County Cavan, Ireland

Coordinates: 54.0048°N 7.1019°W

Bindoo is a townland in the civil parish of Kildrumsherdan in County Cavan, Ireland. It has an area of approximately 0.9 square kilometres (0.35 sq mi). Evidence of ancient settlement in the townland includes a ringfort (rath) site.

The townland, located close to Cootehill, is home to a wind farm which was erected in 2007. It was developed and operated by Airtricity and, as of mid-2007, was the "second largest Airtricity wind farm" in Ireland. The wind farm has 32 GE 1.5 MW Wind Turbines with a 65-metre hub height and 70 metre rotor diameter giving a total capacity of 48 megawatts.
