= Greater Gabbard wind farm =

Wind farm in the North Sea

Greater Gabbard Wind Farm
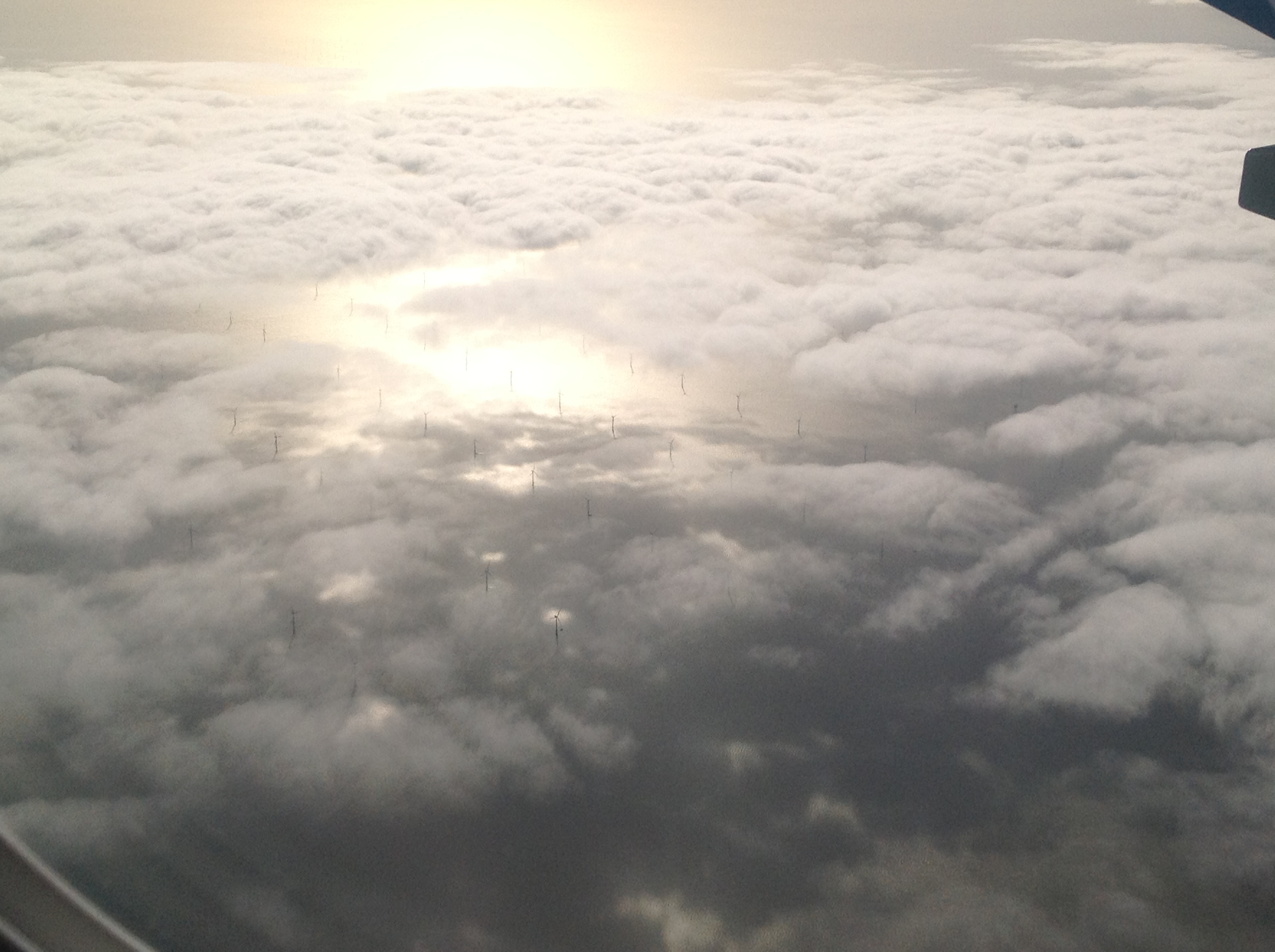
- Country: United Kingdom
- Location: Inner Gabbard and The Galloper banks, North Sea; Suffolk Coast
- Coordinates: 51°53′N 1°56′E
- Status: Operational
- Commission date: 2012
- Owners: Innogy; SSE Renewables

Wind farm
- Type: Offshore
- Distance from shore: 23 km (14 mi)
- Rotor diameter: 107 m (351 ft)

Power generation
- Units operational: 140 × 3.6 MW
- Make and model: Siemens Gamesa SWT-3.6-107 (140)
- Nameplate capacity: 504 MW
- Annual net output: 1,800 GW·h (2013)

External links
- Commons: Related media on Commons

Wind farm layout

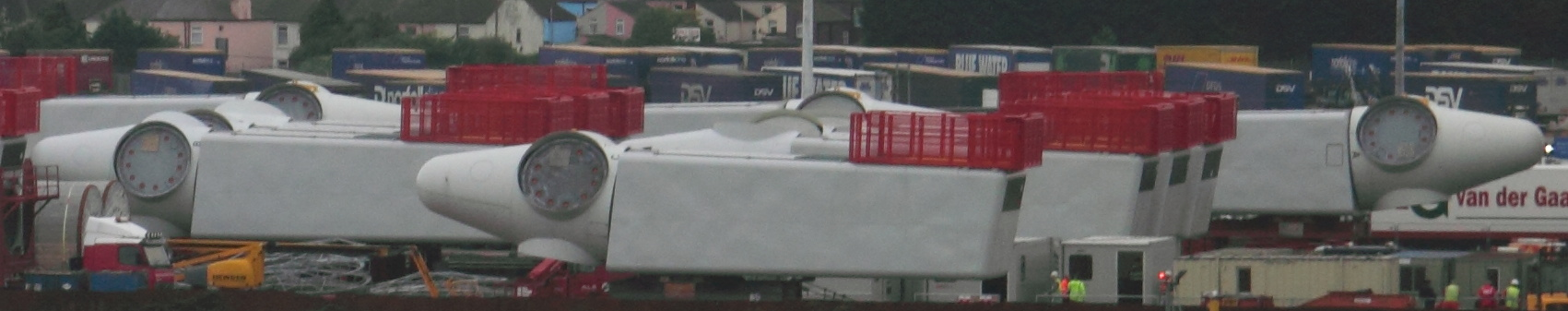
Turbines in harbour, waiting to be mounted; red helicopter platforms on top

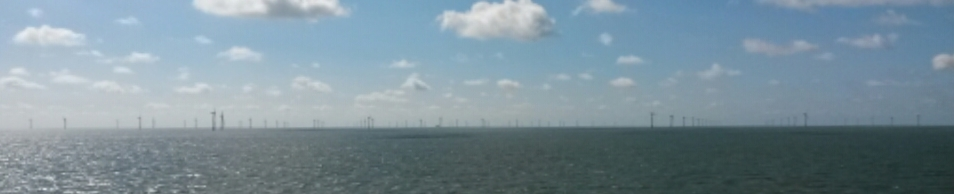
As seen from the Stena Line Harwich to Hook of Holland ferry in 2014

Greater Gabbard is a 504 MW wind farm, built on sandbanks 23 kilometres (14 mi) off the coast of Suffolk in England at a cost of £1.5 billion. It was completed on 7 September 2012 with all of the Siemens SWT3.6–107 turbines connected. Developed as a joint venture between Airtricity and Fluor, it is now jointly owned by SSE Renewables and RWE.

A 336 MW extension of the wind farm called Galloper was commissioned in April 2018.

== History ==
Development rights were secured from the Crown Estate in 2003. The project was originally developed by Greater Gabbard Offshore Winds Limited (GGOWL) which was a joint venture between Airtricity and Fluor. Airtricity was subsequently bought by Scottish & Southern Energy who then bought out Fluor's 50% stake. Fluor were contracted to design, supply, install and commission the balance of the plant. Scottish & Southern sold a 50% stake to RWE, the owners of Npower, in November 2008 for £308m.

The project was given the go-ahead in May 2008 and work started in June. In July 2011 erection of the turbines was two-thirds complete, with all the pile foundations installed.

In October 2009, Seajacks Ltd delivered its 7,000 tonne Leviathan vessel to Fluor Ltd which sailed to Harwich to prepare the hook-up and commissioning of an in-field substation and then installation of the turbines. The first foundations were installed in autumn 2009 with the first of a total of 140 turbines installed in the spring 2010. Electricity generation began on 29 December 2010 and construction was completed on 7 September 2012. During April 2014 to March 2015 the wind farm produced 1.7 TWh, corresponding to a capacity factor of 39%.

=== Galloper extension ===
An extension of the project, called Galloper, was agreed in May 2013. The proposal was to add up to 140 turbines to the development, producing up to 504 MW of electricity. The wind farm was expected to be completed in 2017. The project was developed in partnership by Innogy and SSE.

In November 2013 the project capacity was reduced to 68 turbines producing 340 MW. In March 2014, SSE announced that it would be pulling out of the project. In October 2014 Innogy announced that it too was abandoning the project, but in December the company revealed that it was still seeking potential investment partners.

In October 2015 Innogy secured the financing of the project with three other investors each taking 25% of the project: Macquarie Capital, UK Green Investment Bank and Siemens Financial Services. Siemens Wind Power was awarded the turbine supply contract to deliver 56 SWT-6.0-154 turbines.

At its September 2018 inauguration, Galloper is rated at 353 MW. It is owned by Innogy SE (25%), Siemens Financial Services (25%), Sumitomo Corporation (12.5%), ESB (12.5%) and a consortium managed by Green Investment Group and Macquarie Infrastructure and Real Assets (25%). Innogy SE led development and construction of the wind farm.

== Operation ==
Greater Gabbard wind farm is operated by SSE Renewables, a subsidiary of SSE plc, from a base in Lowestoft which opened in 2009. RWE operates the Galloper extension. A robot scarecrow reduces dangerous levels of bird faeces on the offshore substation.

The turbines can be seen from Stena Line's Harwich to Hook of Holland car and passenger ferry, which passes within a few kilometres of the turbines.

== Specifications ==
- Number of turbines: 140
- Power rating: 504 MW
- Load factor : 39.6% (estimated)
- Levelised cost: £137/MWh.
- Estimated output: 1.75 TWh per year
- Cost: £1,512 million (£650 million not counting grid connection)
- Cost of grid connection: £317 million
- Location: offshore, 23 kilometres (14 mi) from Sizewell on the Inner Gabbard and The Galloper sandbanks
- Water depth: 20–32m

In 2011, the project was described as the world's largest offshore wind farm.

== Incidents ==
On 12 November 2009, a man was killed and a woman injured in Vlissingen after a chain broke and the two people were hit with pieces of the chain. Police responded to the incident, and an investigation was launched. The casualties were on board a tugboat, the Typhoon.

On 21 May 2010, a man died and another suffered serious injuries following an accident at Parkeston Quay, Harwich. A Siemens engineer from Norresundby, Denmark, died in the incident. A 43-year-old German national was taken to Addenbrooke's Hospital. The incident happened at about 7.50 am while loading a wind turbine blade on the vessel Seajack. Siemens and Fluor were ordered to pay £1 million for the incident.

In September 2013 remedial work was begun on the export cables close to shore as the cables were not buried sufficiently deeply. The work which was meant to take three weeks was only finished in September 2014. The work caused problems for local fishermen who asked the Greater Gabbard Offshore Wind Farm for a disruption payment. A spokesman for SSE denied that the work was responsible for the snagging of fishing nets.

== See also ==
- List of offshore wind farms
- List of offshore wind farms in the United Kingdom
- List of offshore wind farms in the North Sea
