= Meentycat wind farm =

Wind farm in County Donegal, Ireland

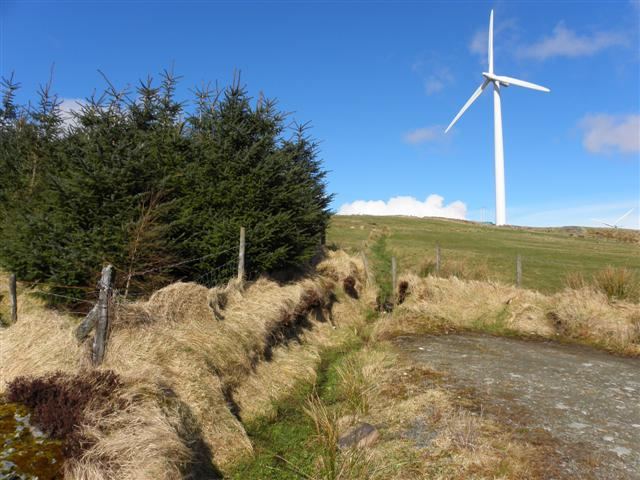
- Wind turbine in Cark townland
- Country: Ireland
- Coordinates: 54°53′04″N 7°53′04″W
- Owner: SSE plc

Meentycat wind farm is a wind farm located north of Ballybofey, County Donegal, Ireland. Erected in 2004, it was Ireland's largest wind farm when it opened in 2005. Originally owned by Airtricity (later SSE Airtricity), as of 2020 it was run by SSE Renewables.

== Turbines ==
Located near Ballybofey in County Donegal, the wind farm has 38 Siemens Wind Power wind turbines. These 23×2.3 megawatt and 15×1.3 megawatt turbines give a total of 72.4 megawatts. With these 38 turbines, spread over five sites, Meentycat wind farm generates enough electricity to power the equivalent of approximately 45,000 homes a year, with CO_{2} savings approaching 200,000 tonnes per year.

Power from the turbines is transmitted to the national grid via a 110kV substation located at Meentycat, a 5km 110kV overhead line and a 110kV substation at Drumkeen to the east of the wind farm. As of 2009, it was the largest wind farm (by electricity generated) in Ireland. It is now owned by SSE Renewables, part of SSE plc.
