= SSE Airtricity =

Irish energy company

SSE Airtricity, Ltd
- Company type: Subsidiary
- Industry: Electricity distribution
- Founded: Dublin, Ireland (1997)
- Headquarters: Dublin, Ireland
- Products: Electricity, Gas
- Number of employees: 750
- Parent: SSE plc
- Website: www.sseairtricity.com

SSE Airtricity (previously Eirtricity) is an energy company founded in Ireland in 1997, now a subsidiary of SSE plc. SSE Airtricity supplies and distributes electricity and gas to Northern Ireland and the Republic of Ireland.

== History ==
The company was founded as Eirtricity (derived from the word Éire, Irish for "Ireland") in 1997 by Eddie O'Connor, developed generation capacity in Ireland based in counties Cavan, Donegal, Sligo and Wexford construction, though only 7 of a planned 200 turbines were actually built. The company changed its name to Airtricity in 2002. It rebranded as SSE Airtricity in February 2014.

In 2007 Airtricity was named 'The No.1 Best Company to Work For in Ireland' by the Great Place To Work Institute.

The company sold its North American assets in October 2007 to the German Group E.ON for approximately $1.4bn. The company was sold to SSE plc in January 2008 for approximately €1.1b.

On 15 January 2009, Airtricity obtained consent from the Dutch Ministry of Transport, Public Works, and Water Management for construction of the West Rhine (Dutch: West-Rijn) wind farm 40 kilometres off the Dutch North Sea coast. The wind farm will consist of up to 72 wind turbines with a total potential power capacity of around 260 MW.

Eddie O'Connor left Airtricity in 2008 and founded Mainstream Renewable Power.

In October 2009 SSE announced that the renewable energy division of Airtricity would be rebranded as SSE Renewables from 1 January 2010.

In May 2010 Airtricity announced that it would be entering the domestic gas market in the Republic of Ireland. Airtricity came under fire in 2010 for an alleged lack of compassion in disconnecting customers with a good bill-paying record.

== Description ==
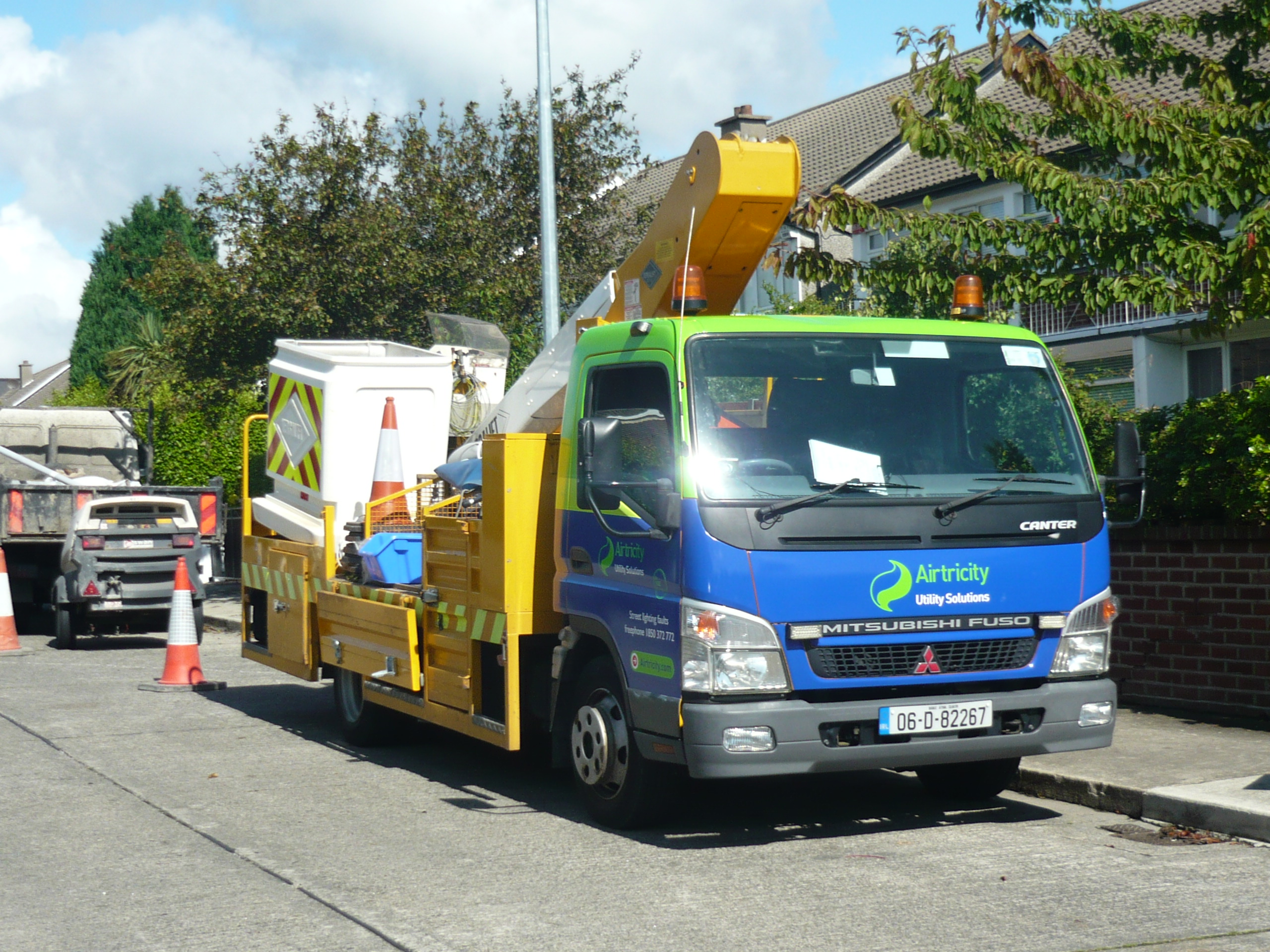
Airtricity truck

SSE Airtricity is owned by Scottish and Southern Energy as of 15 February 2008 and now describes itself as "the renewable arm of Scottish and Southern Energy Group".

As of May 2008, the company had 24 wind farms in operation throughout Ireland and the UK, with a total nameplate capacity of over 600 MW. A further 7 wind farms totalling over 100 MW are under construction. Construction of the Greater Gabbard offshore wind farm with a peak capacity of 500 MW using 140 x 3.6 MW Siemens turbines. These included:

- Ardrossan Wind Farm, Scotland – now sold to Infinis
- Arklow Bank Wind Park, Ireland
- Braes of Doune Wind Farm, Scotland
- Bindoo wind farm, Ireland
- Meentycat wind farm, Ireland
- West Kilbride wind farm, Scotland

SSE Airtricity supplies electricity in both the Republic of Ireland and Northern Ireland to industrial and residential customers. In the Republic of Ireland it competes with ESB Electric Ireland and Bord Gáis Energy, while in Northern Ireland it competes with Viridian, Firmus Energy, Northern Ireland Electricity (NIE) and ESB Electric Ireland.

== Sponsorship ==
In 2010, SSE Airtricity signed a three-year deal to become the primary sponsor of the League of Ireland. In January 2021 a two-year renewal of the existing deal with the (men's) League of Ireland was extended to also cover the Women's National League.

SSE Airtricity currently sponsors the Dublin Marathon and the Great Wall Marathon in Northern Ireland.

SSE Airtricity is also a principal sponsor of the Eco Schools programme.

== See also ==
- Arklow Bank Wind Park
- List of Irish companies
