= Kildrumsherdan =

Civil parish in County Cavan, Ireland

Coordinates: 54°03′N 7°07′W

Kildrumsherdan (Irish: Cill Droim Sirideáin), also recorded as Killersherdiny, is a civil parish in the historical barony of Tullygarvey in County Cavan, Ireland.
