= Sorne Hill wind farm =

Wind farm in County Donegal, Ireland

Coordinates: 55.133°N 7.372°W

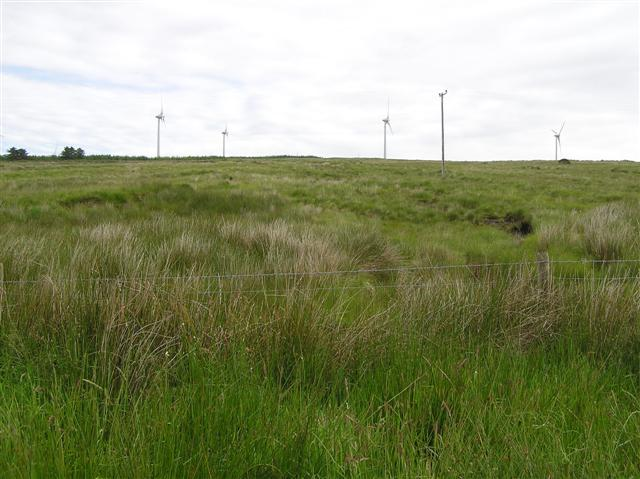
Sorne Hill wind farm is in Sorne townland

The Sorne Hill Wind Farm is a wind farm located in Buncrana, Inishowen County Donegal, Ireland. The development was completed in 2006 and is operated by Bord Gáis Energy.

== Turbines ==
Phase 1 of the farm has 16 gearless wind turbines, type Enercon E-70 2 [MW] with a 64-metre hub height and 71 metre rotor diameter giving a total capacity of 32 megawatts.

Phase 2 of the farm, which is an additional 6.9 MW from three Enercon E-70 2.3 MW turbines, were installed in the Autumn of 2007. This made brought the capacity of Sorne Hill Wind Farm to 38.9 MW.
