= Arklow Bank Wind Park =

Wind farm off the Wicklow coast, Ireland

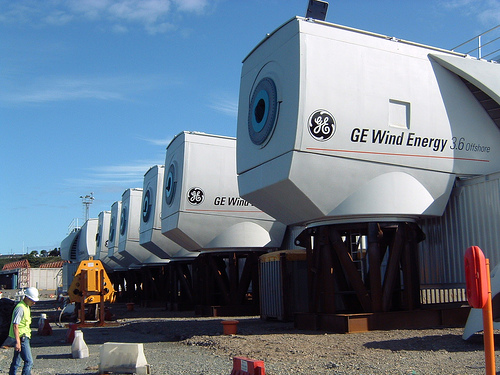
- GE turbines being assembled at Rosslare as part of phase 1 construction in 2003
- Country: Ireland
- Location: Arklow Bank, Irish Sea
- Coordinates: 52.789°N 5.949°W
- Status: Operational
- Construction began: August 2003
- Commission date: June 2004
- Owner: GE Renewable Energy
- Operator: GE Renewable Energy

Wind farm
- Type: Offshore
- Distance from shore: 10 km (6.2 mi)
- Hub height: 73.5 m (241 ft)
- Rotor diameter: 104 m (341 ft)

Power generation
- Units operational: 7
- Make and model: GE Wind Energy: GE 3.6s Offshore
- Nameplate capacity: 25 MW

External links
- Website: ireland.sse.com/what-we-do/our-projects-and-assets/renewable/arklow-bank-wind-park

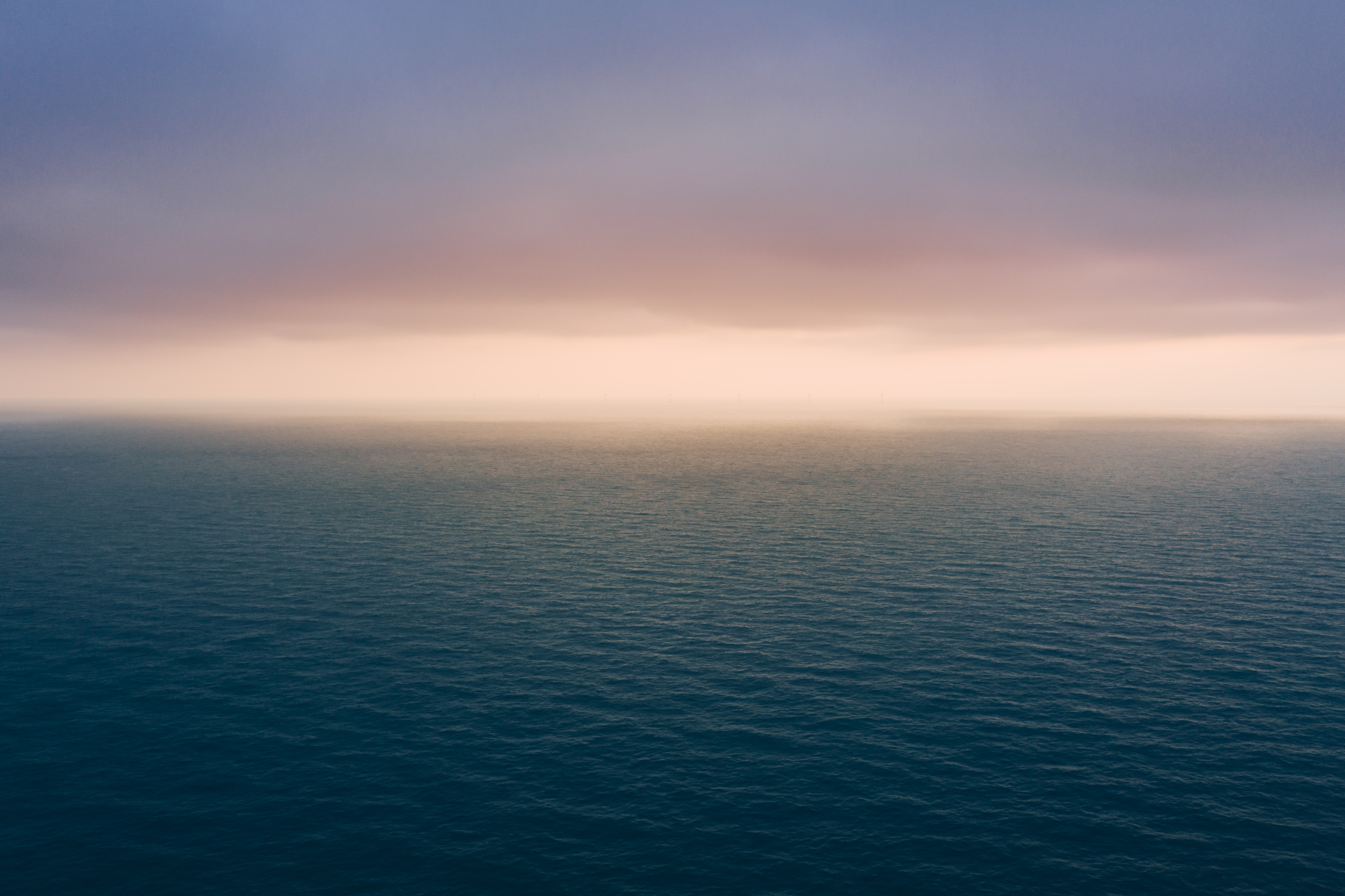
Arklow Bank Wind Park as seen from Arklow town sea shore

Arklow Bank Wind Park is a 25 megawatt offshore wind farm generating electrical power for the Wicklow region in Ireland. It is the first offshore wind farm in Ireland, and the world's first erection of wind turbines rated over 3 MW. It is located on the Arklow Bank, a shallow water sandbank in the Irish Sea, around 10 kilometers (6.2 mi) off the coast of Arklow with an area of 27 by 2.5 kilometres (16.8 by 1.6 mi).

The project is being co-developed by Airtricity and GE Wind Energy. The Arklow Bank Wind Farm capacity remained 25MW as of October 2018. In October 2022, lightning struck and burned a turbine.

== Phase 1 ==
In 2002, Airtricity obtained an offshore lease for a 520 MW offshore wind farm. The first phase of the project, commissioned in June 2004, consists of seven GE 3.6-megawatt generators. They were installed by the Danish offshore wind farms services provider A2SEA. Power cables were laid by Five Oceans Services (now SIEM Offshore Contractors), and construction of the turbines themselves was based out of Rosslare port. All of the turbines have a height of 73.5 metres (241 ft) and height to top of blade of 124 metres (407 ft). The blade length is 50.5 metres (166 ft) and each turbine has three blades. Each turbine weights 290 tonnes. They use steel monopole foundations driven in by a hydraulic hammer and each turbine has a landing platform for boat access. They are spaced 600 metres (2,000 ft) apart. Generated electricity is fed to ESB Networks distribution grid through the Arklow National Grid Substation.

== Phase 2 ==
Phase 2 of the Arklow Project was to be developed in partnership with Acciona Energy of Spain. The development was to consist of a further 193 turbines. However, Phase 2 and the planned connection to Eirgrid transmission system was cancelled in 2007. In January 2018, SSE Ireland confirmed to the Oireachtas Joint Committee On Communications, Climate Action And Environment their continuing commitment and planned investment of over €1B in the project to help meet Ireland's 2020 renewable energy targets. A geotechnical survey was completed in September 2018.

The project is proposed to a larger scheme which includes a further installation at Codling Bank, near Bray Head and would see a total of 1620MW generation capacity, almost twice the offshore turbine capacity in operation worldwide as of 2006. The development has elicited local concern that some 420 turbines would also be visible from coastal Wicklow and Wexford, while applications have been submitted for further wind banks in excess of 1000MW capacity. Local consultation about offshore power generation is minimal, but the local tourism association lists the wind farm as part of the Arklow South Beach. Technological advances since permission was originally sought mean that approximately half the original number of turbines are planned to be deployed in Arklow Bank phase 2, while still achieving the additional power generation capacity of 500MW.

In June 2022, SSE Renewables submitted an application for a Maritime Area Consent (MAC) for Phase 2 project to the Irish government. The MAC application followed an An Bord Pleanála's landmark decision to grant planning permission for the onshore grid infrastructure required to connect the 800-MW Phase 2 of Arklow Bank to Ireland's electricity transmission grid.

== See also ==
- List of offshore wind farms
- List of offshore wind farms in the Irish Sea
- Wind power in Ireland
