= Eddie O'Connor (businessman) =

Irish businessman

Eddie O'Connor (26 June 1947 – 5 January 2024) was an Irish businessman who was co-founder and chairman of Mainstream Renewable Power, a renewable energy group.

O'Connor gained a Bachelor of Chemical Engineering (1970) and a master's in industrial engineering (1976), both from University College Dublin, and had a doctorate in business administration from the International Management Centres, Europe. After completing his bachelor's degree, he joined the Electricity Supply Board of Ireland, where he held several managerial positions, until he left in 1987 to become chief executive officer at Bord na Móna.

He then became founder and chief executive of Airtricity, the Irish wind farm development company from 1997 until January 2008. When Airtricity was sold to E.ON and Scottish & Southern Energy in 2008 for approximately €2 billion, he left to set up Mainstream Renewable Power. He is reported to have earned €50 million from the transaction Mainstream Renewable Power's core business is to develop, build and operate renewable energy plants in collaboration with strategic partners. The company employs over 100 staff and has offices in Berlin, Cape Town, Singapore, Dublin, Glasgow, London, Santiago and Toronto. O'Connor was acknowledged as the driving force behind the European Offshore Supergrid. This vision and activity should, when built, guarantee European energy self-sufficiency as well as producing carbon free electricity.

O'Connor, inspired by the idea of the European Supergrid, founded SuperNode Ltd. SuperNode is a global technology company that designs superconducting connection systems to better connect renewable generation and increase grid interconnection in mature markets. SuperNode was founded in 2018 by O'Connor and Mainstream Renewable Power. SuperNode was co-owned by O'Connor and Norwegian investment group AKER Horizons. SuperNode's innovative new cable technology can transfer huge levels of renewable electricity long distances with reduced losses, costs and footprint. O'Connor was also the Chairman of SuperNode.

O'Connor died after a short illness on 5 January 2024.

== Honours ==
He was an honorary director of the European Wind Energy Association. In 2003, O'Connor was named World Energy Policy Leader by Scientific American magazine. In September 2009, he was presented with the first ever Leadership award at the annual Ernst & Young Global Renewable Energy Awards. In June 2008, he was awarded an honorary doctorate in Science from University College Dublin. In January 2014, he was awarded an honorary doctorate in science from University of Hull. He was also a member of the advisory board of Imperial College London's Energy Futures Lab.

O'Connor was one of several high profile investors announced by Plymouth Argyle F.C. in July 2010.

In 2010, O'Connor was awarded the UCD Foundation Day Medal for his outstanding contribution to engineering.
