= Nordex =

Wind turbine company

Nordex SE
- Type: Societas Europaea
- Traded as: FWB: NDX1; TecDAX component; MDAX component; ÖkoDAX component
- ISIN: DE000A0D6554
- Industry: Wind power industry
- Founded: Give, Denmark 1985
- Headquarters: Hamburg, Germany
- Key people: José Luis Blanco Diéguez (CEO), Dr. Wolfgang Ziebart (Chairman of the supervisory board)
- Products: Wind turbines
- Services: Maintenance of wind turbines
- Revenue: ▲€6.489 billion (2023)
- Operating income: ▲€-208 million (2023)
- Net income: ▲€-302 million (2023)
- Total assets: ▲€5.725 billion (end 2023)
- Total equity: ▲€978 million (end 2023)
- Number of employees: ▲10,133 (average, 2023)
- Website: www.nordex-online.com

Nordex SE is a European company that designs, sells and manufactures wind turbines, founded in 1985 and headquartered in the German city of Hamburg with production in Germany, Brazil, India, Mexico, Poland and Spain. According to the company, it had installed wind turbines with a total capacity of around 50 GW in over 40 countries worldwide by the end of 2023.

== History ==
The company was founded in Give, Denmark in 1985. In 1995 Nordex was the first company to mass-produce a 1 MW wind turbine booster.

On October 1, 2001, the bankrupt company of Südwind Babcock-Borsig was fully implanted into Nordex, which then continued to produce Südwind turbines in the 1.5 MW class (ProTec MD 1,500 kW) from 2001 - originally from "pro + pro Energiesysteme" (a subsidiary of aerodyn Energiesysteme GmbH and Denker & Wulf) developed the S70 and later the S77 - under license..

In 2016, the wind turbine manufacture business unit of Spanish conglomerate Acciona, Acciona Windpower, merged with those of Nordex to form Nordex Group. Acciona S.A. has since been the main shareholder of the Nordex Group with about 47 % of outstanding shares.

== Organisation ==
The company's headquarters are in the German city of Rostock while management is in Hamburg. Nordex produces at sites in Germany, Brazil, India, Mexico and Poland and Spain. The main production facility is located at the headquarters in Rostock. Nordex has branches and subsidiaries in 19 countries.

== Products ==
As of 2013, the third generation of Nordex wind turbines included two platforms, rated at 2.4 and 3.3 MW.

In Europe, Africa and North America Nordex manufactures and sells the Gamma series, a product family comprising the N90/2500, the N100/2500 and the N117/2400. The N90/2500 is a turbine being developed for strong winds. The N100/2500 consists of two versions, Highspeed and Lowspeed, the first one for rather windy locations, the second for medium wind conditions. The N117/2400 was designed especially for low-wind regions (IEC 3). The hub height of the 2.4-2.5 MW windturbines reaches from 65 meters for the N90/2500 to 141 meters for the low wind version of the N117/2400.

=== Technical data 2.5MW Gamma class ===
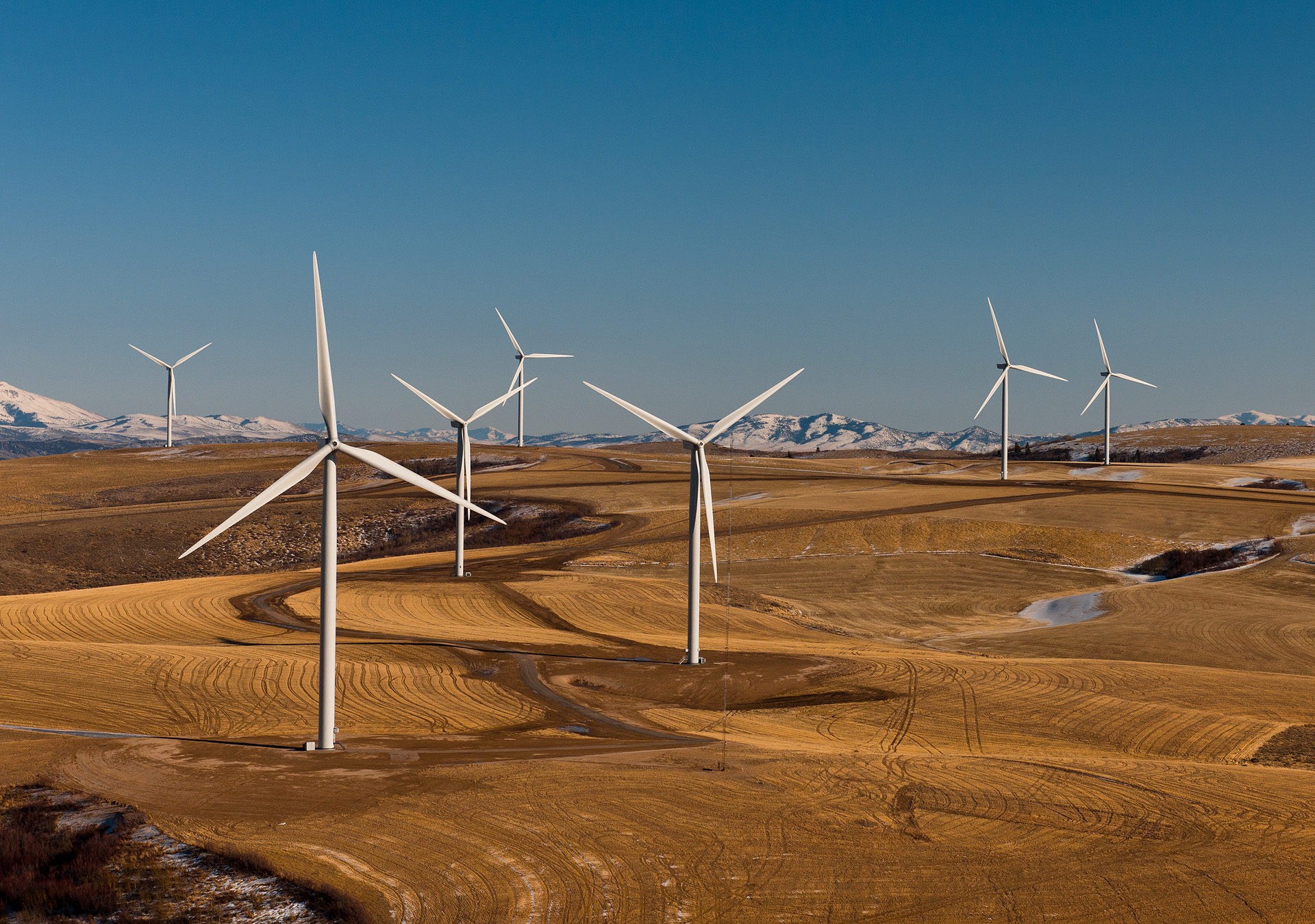
N100/2500 in the United States

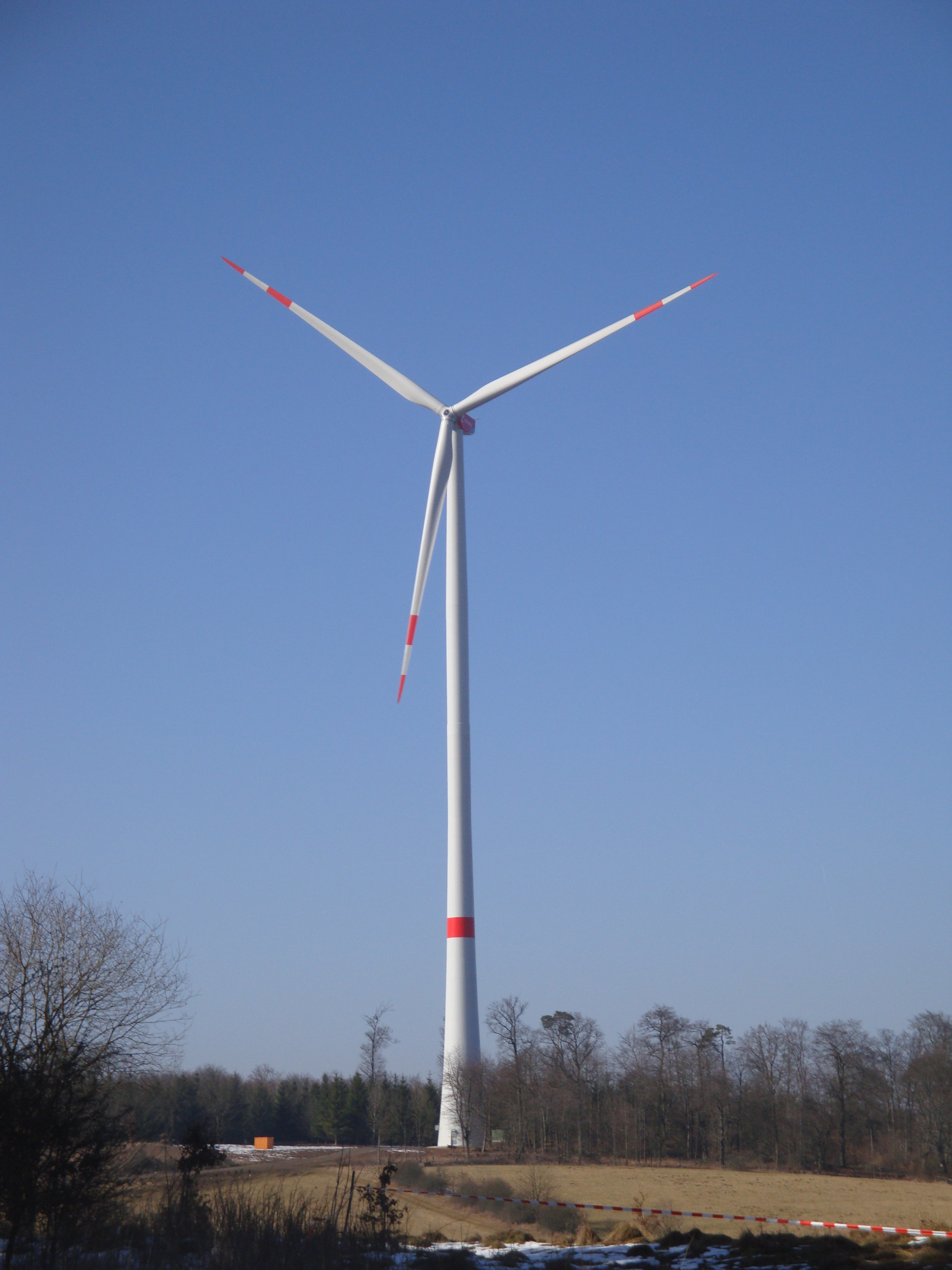
Nordex N117/2400 (Gamma) in Germany

Parameter	N80 IEC1	N90 IEC1	N90 IEC2	N100 IEC 2	N100 IEC3	N117/2400 IEC3
Rated Power (kW)	2,500	2,500	2,500	2,500	2,500	2,400
Cut-in wind speed (m/s)	3	3	3	3	3	3
Cut-out wind speed (m/s)	25	25	25	25	25	20
Rotor diameter (m)	80	90	90	100	100	117
Swept area (m^{2})	5,026	6,362	6,362	7,823	7,823	10,751
m^{2} per MW	2,010	2,548	2,548	3,129	3,129	4,480
Revolutions per minute	10.8-18.9	10.3-18.1	9.6-16.8	9.6-14.8	9.6-14.8	7.5-13.2
Overspeed control	Pitch	Pitch	Pitch	Pitch	Pitch	Pitch
Gearbox	yes	yes	yes	yes	yes	yes
Generator	double-fed asynchronous generator	double-fed asynchronous generator	double-fed asynchronous generator	double-fed asynchronous generator	double-fed asynchronous generator	double-fed asynchronous generator
Grid frequency	50/60 Hertz	50/60 Hertz	50/60 Hertz	50/60 Hertz	50/60 Hertz	50/60 Hertz
Hub height (m)	60	65/70/80	80/100	75/80/100	80/100/140	91/120/141

WKA Nordex

=== Delta/Delta4000-Class ===
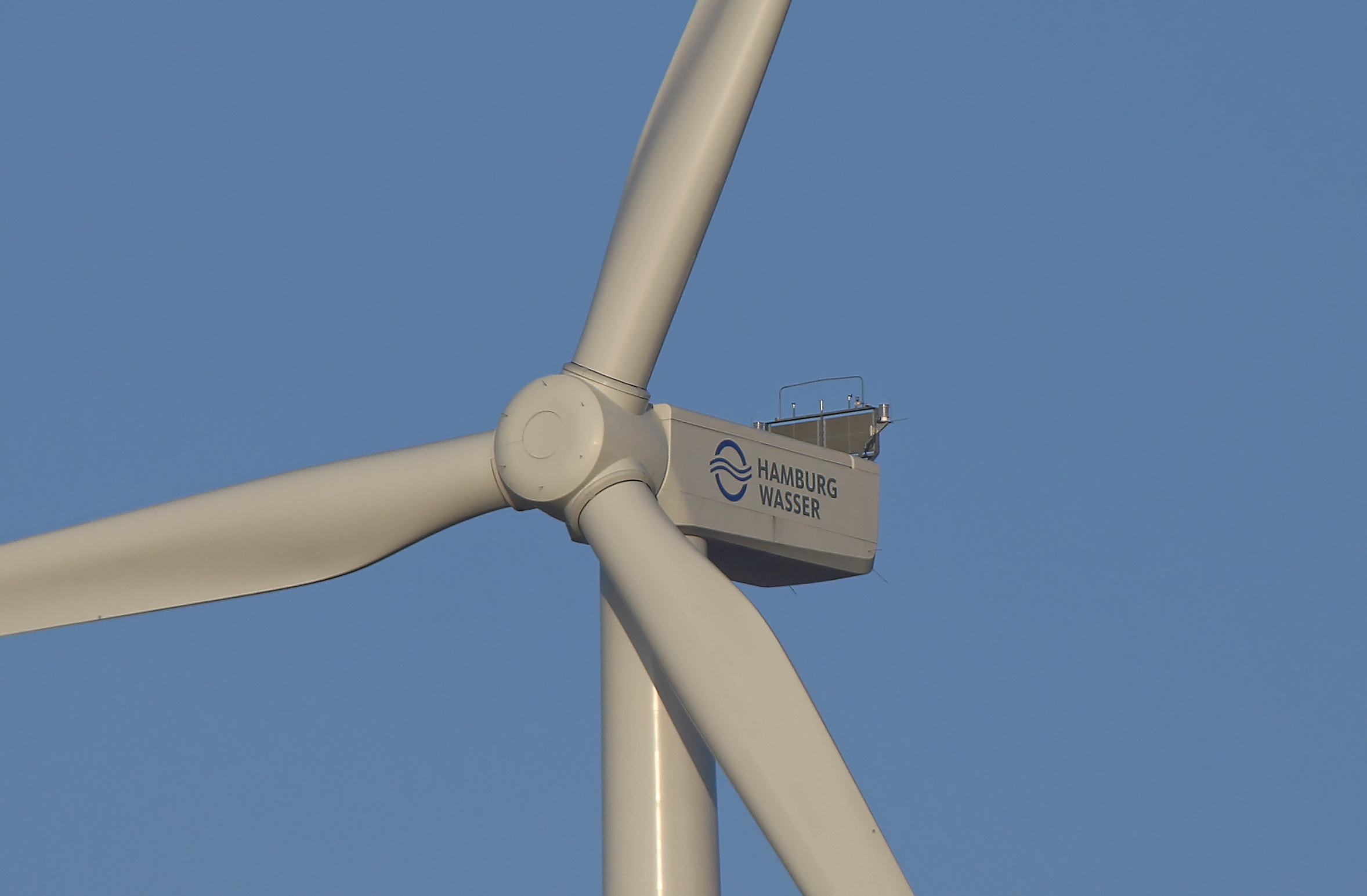
Delta-Class-Turbine

In 2013 Nordex launched the Delta-Class-Series, entering series production in January 2014 with prototypes installed in mid-2013. There will be two new types of turbines, the N100/3300 strong-wind turbine and the N117/3000, which is designed for medium-wind sites. Both turbines feature the rotorblades already used in the Gamma-Series, with the rotorblades of the N117 being slightly upgraded to withstand the higher wind speeds in IEC wind class 2a. Both turbines are equipped with a three-stage gearbox and a doubly fed asynchronous generator.

Parameter	N117/3600	N131/3600	N131/3900	N133/4.8	N149/4.x	N149/5.x	N155/4.x	N155/5.x	N163/5.x	N163/6.x	N169/5.x	N175/6.x
Rated Power (kW)	3,600	3,600	3,900	4,800	4,000–4,500 MW (project specific up to 4,800)	5,000-5,x00	4,000-4,x00	5,000-5,x00	5,000-5,x00	6,000-6,x00	up to 5,500	6,000-6,x00
Cut-in wind speed (m/s)	3											
Cut-out wind speed (m/s)	25	25	25	up to 28	20 (project specific up to 26)	up to 26	25	25	up to 26	up to 26	24	20
Rotor diameter (m)	116.8	131	131	133.2	149.1	149.1	155	155	163	163	169	175
Tip speed (m/s)	77	81.6	86.2	N/A	N/A	N/A	N/A	N/A	N/A	N/A	N/A	N/A
Swept area (m^{2})	10,715	13,478	13,478	13,935	17,460	17,460	18,870	18,870	20,867	20,867	22,432	24,053
m^{2} per MW	2,976	3,744	3,456	2903	~4,300	~3,400	~4,700	~3,700	~4,100	~3,400	~4,000	~4,000
Revolutions per minute	7.9–14.1	7.5–13.6	7.9–14.4	N/A	N/A	N/A	N/A	N/A	N/A	N/A	N/A	N/A
Overspeed control	Pitch											
Gearbox	3-stage gearbox (planetary-planetary-spur gear)	3-stage gearbox (planetary-planetary-spur gear)	3-stage gearbox (planetary-planetary-spur gear)	high-speed gearbox	Type 3-stage (planetary-planetary-spur gear)	high-speed gearbox	planetary-planetary-spur gear	planetary-planetary-spur gear	high-speed gearbox	high-speed gearbox	high-speed gearbox	high-speed gearbox
Generator	double-fed asynchronous generator											
Grid frequency	50/60 Hertz											
Hub height (m)	up to 134	up to 134	up to 134	project and site-specific	up to 164	up to 164	up to 164	up to 164	up to 164	up to 164	111.5 m (initial offering)	up to 179

== See also ==
- Lamma Winds
- List of wind turbine manufacturers
- Wind power in Germany
- Offshore wind power
