= SSE Renewables =

Scottish renewable energy subsidiary

- Company type: Subsidiary
- Industry: Electricity generation
- Founded: 2010; 16 years ago
- Headquarters: Perth, Scotland
- Area served: United Kingdom; Ireland
- Key people: Stephen Wheeler (Managing Director)
- Products: Electricity
- Parent: SSE plc
- Website: www.sserenewables.com

SSE Renewables is a renewable energy subsidiary of SSE plc, which develops and operates onshore and offshore wind farms and hydroelectric generation in the United Kingdom and Ireland.

== History ==
In October 2009, SSE announced that Airtricity would be rebranded as SSE Renewables from 1 January 2010, with the Airtricity brand still in existence as an energy supplier in both the Republic of Ireland and Northern Ireland.

== Description ==
SSE Renewables is owned by SSE plc and describes itself as "the renewable development division of SSE".

SSE Renewables operates the Greater Gabbard wind farm off the coast of England, and the Beatrice wind farm off the coast of Scotland. The company built and operates the 72 megawatt (MW) Meentycat wind farm, currently the largest Irish wind farm, supplying 100% renewable electricity to its customers.

The company's hydroelectric assets in Scotland include those developed by the North of Scotland Hydro-Electric Board, which became Scottish Hydro Electric in 1989 and merged to form SSE in 1998.
