= Greencoat Renewables =

Irish renewable energy investment company

Greencoat Renewables PLC
- Type: Public
- Traded as: Euronext Dublin: GRP; ISEQ 20 component Euronext Growth
- ISIN: IE00BF2NR112
- Industry: Wind and Renewable Energy
- Founded: 2017
- Founders: Richard Nourse
- Headquarters: Dawson Street, Dublin, Ireland
- Area served: Europe
- Key people: Paul O'Donnell and Bertrand Gautier
- Website: www.greencoat-renewables.com

Greencoat Renewables PLC is an Irish investment company investing in primarily Irish and Euro-denominated European wind farms and renewable energy infrastructure. Founded in 2017, its primary listing is on the Irish Stock Exchange, where it is a constituent of the ISEQ 20 index. Greencoat Capital LLP acts as investment manager to Greencoat Renewables PLC and its sister company Greencoat UK Wind.

== History ==
The company had a market capitalisation of €747.3 million as at 31 December 2019 and produced 1,154GWh from its 15 Irish wind farms in the year to 31 December.

In October 2020, the company revealed that purchase of the An Cnoc wind farm in County Tipperary, Ireland had been completed. In November 2020, the company announced a placing of new shares aimed at raising approximately €100m for the company.

In May 2022, it was announced Greencoat had acquired four onshore wind farms in France from the Swiss energy company, Axpo.

In August 2024, Greencoat acquired a 50 per cent share in the 80.5 MW South Meath Solar Farm in County Meath from Statkraft.
