= Annandale Way =

Scottish hiking trail

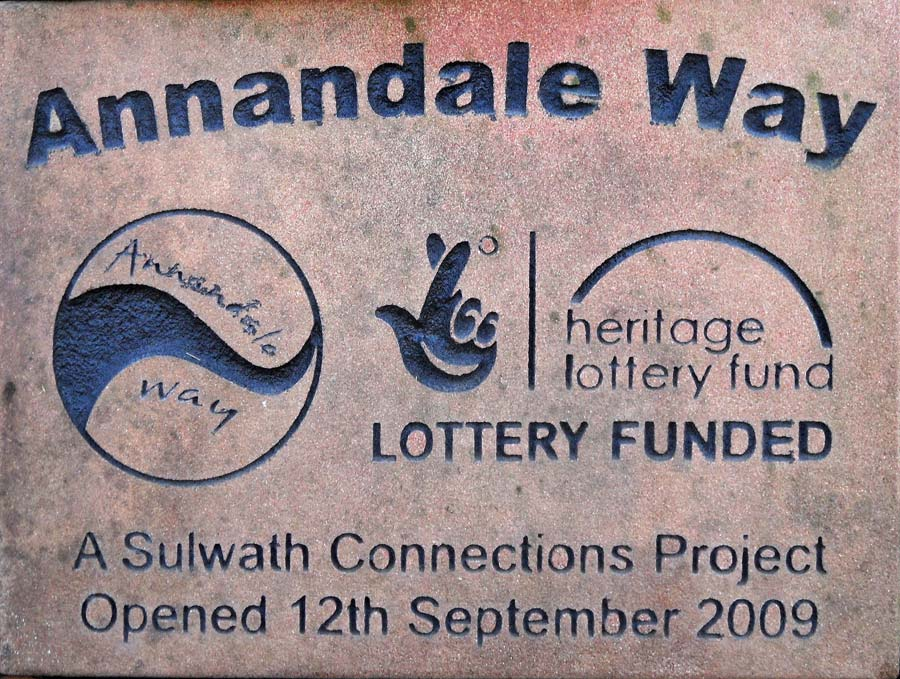
- Plaque on the commemorative cairn at the start of the Annandale way - north end.
- Length: 90 km (56 mi)
- Location: Scotland
- Established: 2009
- Designation: Scotland's Great Trails
- Trailheads: Moffat; 55.4101°N 3.4487°W; Annan; 54.9678°N 3.2823°W
- Use: Hiking
- Elevation gain/loss: 1,150 metres (3,770 ft) gain
- Highest point: 491 m (1,611 ft)
- Lowest point: Sea level
- Website: http://www.annandaleway.org

The Annandale Way is a 90-kilometre (56 mi) hiking trail in Scotland, which is officially designated by NatureScot as one of Scotland's Great Trails. It follows the valley of the River Annan from its source in the Moffat Hills to the sea in the Solway Firth south of the town of Annan. The route, which was established on 12 September 2009, has been designed to be traversable in four to five days as a continuous walk but it also offers several day-walks. Overnight stops can be arranged in small market towns and villages along the route such as Moffat, Johnstonebridge, Lochmaben, Lockerbie, or Annan. The route has been developed by Sulwath Connections and local communities, with the support of local estates and farmers, to help promote Annandale as a new area for walking. Its trailheads are near the Devil's Beef Tub in the Moffat Hills and on the Solway Firth just south of Annan, in Newbie.

== Route description ==
Way (right edge of the picture) with the Solway Firth and Criffel beyond; which is a hill near the mouth of the Nith estuary. The northernmost point of the walk is marked by a commemorative cairn at the head of the Tweedhope Burn in the saddle between Spout Craig and Chalk Ridge Edge (OS. Ref. NT084138). This is also on the watershed between the headwater systems of the river Annan to the south and the River Tweed to the north. This cairn is seen at the start of the route when walking it from north to south, although of course it is necessary to walk in from the nearest tarred road to get to this point. In fact this northernmost section of the Way, from Moffat up Annandale to the cairn, offers a loop such that one can get to the cairn from the east bank of the river Annan by the Tweedhope burn and then return by a circumnavigation of the Devil's Beef Tub to Annanhead and the west bank of the river. On the official website this loop out from Moffat and back is suggested as a 13-mile (21 km) day walk. Heading south from Moffat the Annandale Way joins the Southern Upland Way briefly near the village of Beattock, beyond which it passes through ancient oak forests and over farmland down the valley to near Templand, where again there is a choice of alternative routes.

The choice from there is either to go by Millhousebridge and Kettleholm to Hoddom Castle with a possible loop off to Lockerbie, or to go by Lochmaben and Hightae to Hoddom Castle. The Lockerbie route takes in Lockerbie Wildlife Trust's Eskrigg Nature Reserve with its loch and wildlife while the Lochmaben route takes in Castle Loch with its ruined medieval castle.

Between Moffat and Hoddom Castle the Way does not stay close to the river Annan, although it does cross it once on each of the two alternative routes. From Hoddom Castle, however, the Way follows the river most of the time as it makes its way southward by Brydekirk, Annan and Newbie to the Solway at Barnkirk Point.

The Ordnance Survey maps required for the Annandale Way are Explorer map 322 ("Annandale") and Explorer map 330 ("Moffat & St Mary's Loch").

== Attractions along the route ==
=== The Borders Forest Trust Corehead project ===
When gaining access to the cairn at the northern end of the Annandale Way by approaching it along the valley floor northward from Moffat, the route starts to ascend eastward just before it arrives at Corehead. It ascends by the Tweedhope Burn from the valley to the starting cairn near Spout Craig. The route as you ascend is filled with trees planted by the Borders Forest Trust since they took over ownership of 640 hectares of land at Corehead in the summer of 2009. Their mission statement reads, "The hills and valleys of Corehead were once covered in the native woodland and wild habitats of the Ettrick Forest. Due to centuries of intensive grazing the land is now bare and only small pockets of heather moorland and native woodland remain. The Trust plans to return these lost habitats to the land of Corehead and restore a core area of the wild Ettrick Forest to the south of Scotland."

=== Iron Age settlements in Upper Annandale ===
Studying Upper Annandale on the "Moffat & St Mary's Loch" map shows that the area is rich in Iron Age settlements. These Iron Age settlements are not always easy to identify with the untrained eye. However, on the descent along the old coach road from the A701 towards Moffat, there is a settlement very close to the Way at OS Ref NT067104 which is reasonably easy to make out.

=== Monument to Air Chief Marshal Hugh Dowding ===
The Annandale Way does not actually go through the town of Moffat but no great diversion is required to do so. In the park at the southern end of town there is a memorial to Air Chief Marshal Hugh Dowding who was born in the town in 1882. He was the commander of RAF Fighter Command during the Battle of Britain, and is generally credited with playing a crucial role in Britain's defence, and hence, the defeat of Hitler's plan to invade Britain.

=== The vendace of Lochmaben ===
Along the path by Castle Loch in Lochmaben there is a sculpture trail which is worth looking out for in its own right. However, look out for the sculpted seat with the fish on the back of it and the name Vendace carved into the wood above the fish. The vendace has been under serious threat of extinction in Britain and conservation bodies have been making considerable efforts to save the species. It is thought that the once thriving population of vendace in the Lochmaben lochs is now extinct. However, there is a thriving population of vendace in Loch Skeen in the Moffat hills close-by. They were introduced there as fry from Bassenthwaite Lake in the Lake District of England in 1997 and 1999 and so far this is a success story for conservation. Unfortunately the Bassenthwaite vendace are now thought to be extinct.

=== Mossburn Community Animal Farm ===
After passing through the village of Hightae the Annandale Way travels south briefly along the B7020 before it turns off at Mossburn Community Animal Farm. This establishment was originally set up in 1987 to provide help for misused, abused, unwanted and neglected horses and ponies as well as to offer help for young people with physical and mental problems. This original remit was later widened into care for all domestic animals except cats, dogs and donkeys which have their own specific charities. Their mission statement says that they provide assistance for the care and welfare of the animals, provide activities on a wide range of animal topics aimed at informing, advising, educating and enabling participants to develop their knowledge of animals, provide placements for people referred from education psychological services, social work, children's homes, and provide projects and facilities for schools to allow children to learn about and care for animals. They faced a major, but ultimately, successful battle with the authorities during the British outbreak of Foot-and-mouth disease in 2001 because of their resolve to save their animals from incineration.

=== The ridge leading to Joe Graham's Monument ===
From the animal refuge the track begins to climb up onto the ridge above Rammerscales House (which dates from 1768 and has an interesting history). Travelling south along this ridge presents excellent views of both Annandale in general and of the distinctive flat top of Burnswark hill which dominates the low land to the east of Annandale. There was a hill fort of the ancient Britons at Burnswark until it was taken over by the Romans who built large marching camps on both the north and south sides of the hill and went on to turn the south side into a training camp where Roman soldiers would be sent to learn artillery skills.

The ridge has small hills rising from it on which there are two castle forts: Range Castle Fort and the less obvious Moss Castle Fort. Just beyond these on the top of Almagill hill is a steep pyramidal monument around 6 metres high to the huntsman called Joe Graham. The inscription on this monument reads, "In Memory of Joe Graham for many years huntsman of the Dumfries Shire fox hounds who died in 1893 at the age of 80 and now he has gone far far away we shall never hear his voice in the morning". A roundel with a granite surround above this inscription contains a bronze relief showing a huntsman with his horn, his horse and his dogs. This roundel is signed J W Dods and dated 1896. Sitting beside the triangulation point on the highest point of the ridge at a height of 217 metres above sea level the monument presents quite an impressive prospect.

=== Hoddom Castle and Repentance Tower ===
There is a caravan park with camping facilities at Hoddom Castle which could be useful for those intending to walk the Annandale Way. Repentance Tower perched on top of a hill with a view over the Solway Firth served as a watch tower for Hoddom Castle and a fire lit on the top would have served to warn the neighbourhood of invasion. It was built around 1560 and has a rich history in legend and local hearsay. Many stories attempt to explain its construction but all conclude that the word "Repentance" which is inscribed above the door suggests that the tower was built to make amends for some act of treachery. There is certainly a bleak enigmatic presence about the place.

=== Voice of the river ===
Along the Annandale Way at various points there is a series of information boards each with the title "Voice of the River" which address the reader as though it were the river speaking and telling of the flora and fauna, the history of each place and generally what is to be seen around the river at that point. There are also other boards more specifically dedicated to the wildlife and ecology. One natural feature of the river bank between Annan and Brydekirk is the proliferation of Himalayan Balsam. Although the flower on this plant is very pleasant to look at with its orchid-like appearance it is clearly intent on colonising the river bank.

== Historical connections ==
=== The town of Annan ===
Along the Way at four points there are also information boards relating to the Robert the Bruce Trail. Robert, later to become Robert I King of Scotland, was the 7th Lord of Annandale from 1304 till 1312. When the Norman family of Brus was granted land in Annandale by King David I it was at Annan that they settled at first. They built their Motte-and-bailey castle here shortly after 1124. Although the structural evidence of the castle has long since been removed the large mound (motte) on which the fort was built and the lower protective enclosure (bailey) with its defensive man-made cliff face is still there to be seen and the Way passes very close by. There is also a stone known as the Bruce Stone in Annan Town Hall which has inscribed on it "Robert de Brus Count of Carrick and Lord of Annandale". The information boards near the castle are rich in information about the Brus dynasty and their connection with Annan.

=== The four royal towns of Lochmaben ===
In the village of Hightae there is another information board which tells how what are now the small villages of Greenhill, Heck, Hightae and Smallholm were founded as royal towns by King Robert I in the early 14th century. In each settlement portions of land were entrusted to experienced soldiers, who held them directly from the king and so were known as the "King's Kindly Tenants". They had the right to share the common lands and resources of woods and water; in consequence of which they were unusually privileged throughout subsequent centuries. In return the Kindly Tenants were obliged to provide provisions and garrisons when Lochmaben Castle was occupied by the King or his representatives.

=== Lochmaben ===
In around the year 1200 the Brus family moved from Annan to Lochmaben where they built a motte-castle near what is now known as Lochmaben Castle. The earthworks and stonework of this later Lochmaben Castle are a prominent feature at the south end of Castle Loch in Lochmaben. The earthworks are the remains of a castle built by King Edward I of England around the year 1300. The original peel, built of earth and timber, was strengthened by Richard Siward Sheriff of Dumfries and builder of Tibbers Castle in Nithsdale. The surviving stonework dates from later in the 14th century when the castle was rebuilt. It was first mentioned in 1364. The castle was constantly fought over during the 14th century and changed hands several times. Both Scottish and English forces contributed to its massive structure. For over 300 years Lochmaben Castle held a key defensive position controlling access northwards through Upper Annandale and westwards into Galloway.

=== Ericstane and Corehead ===
Starting the Annandale Way from the north end and travelling along the ridge above the Devil's Beef Tub over Chalk Rig Edge and Annanhead Hill the route joins the A701 road briefly before it takes to the old coach road down into Moffat. By the side of the A701 at this point there is another information board belonging to the Robert the Bruce Trail. The significance of this point in the story is that in February 1306 after killing the John Comyn in the church of the Greyfriars monastery in Dumfries, Robert the Bruce was making his way to Glasgow to seek absolution from the Bishop there and support for his bid to be King of Scotland when in the hills near Ericstane he met James Douglas who was bringing a message of support from the Bishop of St Andrews to Bruce. Douglas pledged his loyalty to Bruce and was to become one of his staunchest allies. Some sources say that the meeting between Bruce and Douglas took place on the Crown of Scotland hill.

After Bruce's death in 1329 the Black Douglas, as he was known, took Bruce's heart in a casket with him on crusade against the Moors in Spain and died in battle there near Granada after throwing Bruce's heart into what he knew to be a hopeless fray. Bruce's heart is believed to be buried at Melrose Abbey and his body lies in Dunfermline Abbey.

By the side of the A701 close-by the information board there is also a monument to the Covenanter John Hunter, who was shot on the hillside opposite in 1685.

There was a peel tower at Corehead owned by a Thomas Halliday in 1297. it is claimed that this Thomas Halliday was married to one of the daughters of Sir Malcolm Wallace and was thus a brother-in-law of Sir William Wallace. It is further claimed that, "Not long out of his teens Sir William, with four followers, came to Corehead. Here (at the home of his sister Mrs Thomas Halliday) was mustered the small devoted band who struck the first blow for Scotland's freedom from England"
