= Annan (surname) =

Annan is a Scottish surname and Akan surname. The use of Annan as a surname is most common in Great Britain, Ghana, and other former British colonies. The earliest reference of Annan used as a surname is found in the 13th century Ragman Rolls during which Scots pledged homage to nobles. It is likely that people originating from or living in Annan, Dumfries and Galloway adopted "Annan" as their surname. Notable people with the Annan surname include:

- Abraham Annan (born 1988), Ghanaian footballer
- Alyson Annan (born 1973), Australian field hockey player
- Andrew Annan (1805–1896), American politician and physician from Maryland
- Anthony Annan (born 1986), Ghanaian footballer
- Archie Annan (1877–1949), Scottish footballer
- Beulah Annan (1899–1928), American suspected murderer
- Christian Annan (born 1978), Ghanaian-born Hong Kong footballer
- Daniel Francis Annan (1928–2006), Ghanaian judge and politician
- Dorothy Annan (1908–1983), English painter, potter and muralist
- Dunc Annan (1895–1981), American football player
- Ebenezer Annan (born 2002), Ghanaian footballer
- Gabriele Annan (1921–2013), British author, and literary and film critic
- James Annan, British climatologist
- James Craig Annan (1864–1946), Scottish photographer
- John Annan Bryce (1841–1923), Scottish businessman and politician
- Kodwo Sam Annan, Ghanaian politician; member of parliament in the first republic of Ghana
- Kofi Annan (1938–2018), Secretary-General of the United Nations
- Kojo Annan (born 1973), Ghanaian businessman and son of Kofi Annan
- Noel Annan, Baron Annan (1916–2000), member of the House of Lords and British academic
- Richard Annan (born 1968), English footballer
- Thomas Annan (1829–1887), Scottish photographer, father of James Craig Annan

== See also ==
- List of Scottish Gaelic surnames
- Annan, Dumfries and Galloway
- Battle of Annan
- Battle of Annan Moor
- Annanhead Hill
- River Annan
- Annandale (disambiguation)
- Annan Castle
- RAF Annan
- HMS Annan (K404)
