= Kinnel Water =

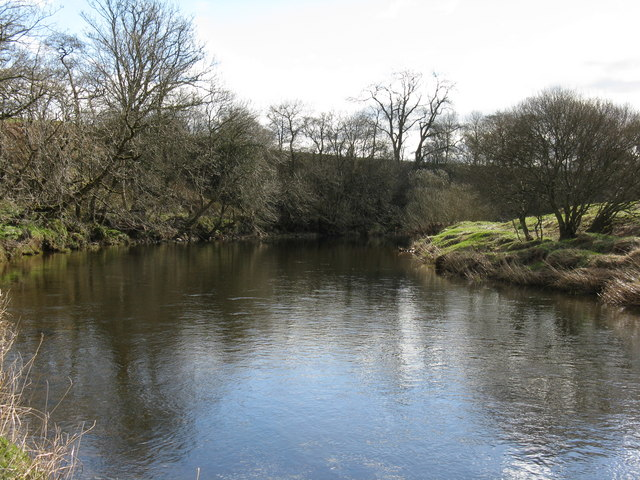

Location
- Country: Scotland
- Council area: Dumfries and Galloway

Physical characteristics
- Source
  - location: On the southern edge of the Lowther Hills
  - coordinates: 55°18′56″N 3°35′35″W
- Mouth
  - location: Northeast of Lochmaben in the River Annan
  - coordinates: 55°8′20″N 3°24′56″W
- Length: 32 km (20 mi)

The Kinnel Water is a river in the Scottish council area of Dumfries and Galloway, in the shire of Dumfriesshire.

== History ==
The Kinnel Water rises on the southern edge of the Lowther Hills around 2 kilometres (1.2 mi) north of the top of Queensberry near the border with the neighboring council area of South Lanarkshire. A source river flows from the River Clyde, which flows to the northwest, at a distance of around 400 m (1,300 ft). After its upper course mainly follows a south-eastern direction through a hilly landscape, its course takes a southern direction after about 2 kilometres (1.2 mi). For a few kilometers, the A701 runs largely parallel to the left bank before crossing the river. Around 2 kilometres (1.2 mi) northeast of Lochmaben it joins the River Annan, which subsequently flows into the Irish Sea via the Solway Firth. With a total length of around 32 km (20 mi), the river overcomes a height of 402 m (1,319 ft).

Several streams flow into the Kinnel Water on its course; there are no significant inflows other than the Water of Ae that flows into Templand. The Kinnel Water runs through a sparsely populated region, so that it affects few towns, of which Templand is the most populous.

== Structures ==
The Kinnel Bridge spans the river near Templand and is protected as a Category A monument. The three-arch stone bridge was built in 1723 and was expanded around 100 years later. In Templand, the river also passes through the listed farmhouse Ross Mains. Next is upriver with Raehills House, a mansion of the Earl of Annandale and Hartfell near the right bank.
