= Annan =

Annan may refer to:

== People ==
- Annan (surname)

== Places ==
=== Australia ===
- Annan River, Queensland, a river just south of Cooktown

=== Canada ===
- Annan, Ontario, a community within the municipality of Meaford

=== China ===
- Annan (Tang protectorate), the southernmost province of the Tang dynasty

=== United Kingdom ===
- Annan, Dumfries and Galloway, Scotland
  - Annan Academy, a secondary school
  - Annan Athletic F.C., a football club
  - Annan Castle
  - Annan railway station
- River Annan, Dumfries and Galloway
- Annan (Parliament of Scotland constituency), prior to 1707

=== Taiwan ===
- Annan District, in the north of Tainan City

== Others ==
- Annan (kata), karate kata
- Annan (film)

== See also ==
- Battle of Annan
- Battle of Annan Moor
- Annanhead Hill
- Annandale (disambiguation)
- RAF Annan
- HMS Annan (K404)
- Annan Plan for Cyprus, United Nations proposal to reunify Cyprus
- Annam (disambiguation)
- Anu (Irish goddess), sometimes given as Anann
