= Hoddom =

Village in Dumfries and Galloway, Scotland

Coordinates: 55.044°N 3.311°W

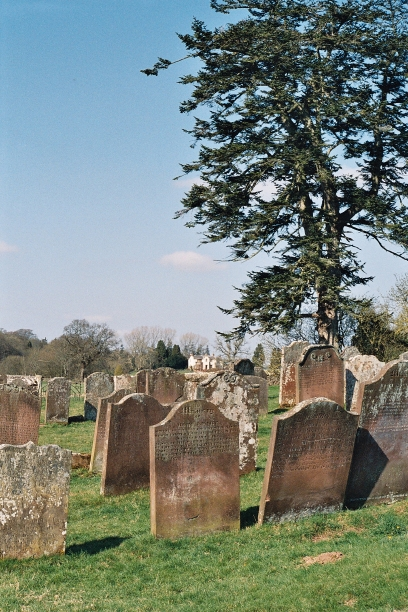
Site of Saint Mungo's 7th century Monastery

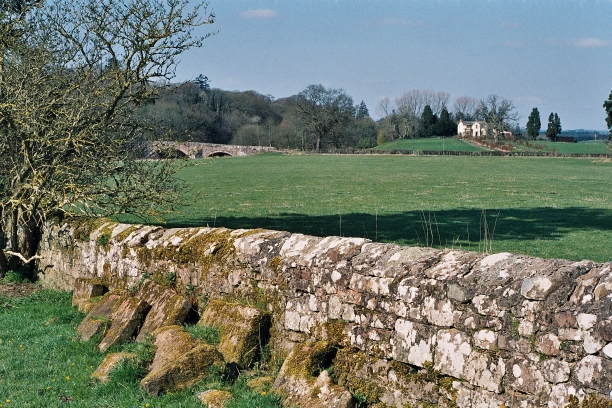
Hoddom Bridge

Hoddom is a small settlement and civil parish in Dumfries and Galloway, Scotland, dating back to the 8th century.

== Location ==
Hoddom is 13 miles by road East of Dumfries and 5 miles South of Lockerbie.

== History ==
The earliest reference to Hoddom is in a copy of an eighth-century letter sent from Alcuin to Wulfhard, 'abbot of Hodda Helm' (abbatem Hodda Helmi). The twelfth-century 'Life of St Kentigern' by Jocelyn of Furness records that St Kentigern established his see at Hoddom. Other than Jocelyn's work, there is no evidence to support this. However, there is strong material evidence of a Northumbrian monastic site at Hoddom.

Hoddom is a Titular see of the Roman Catholic Church.

== Castle ==
Hoddom Castle, the old Maxwell fortalice, to the south-west of the parish, was once part of the Scottish border defences.

== Churches ==
Fragments remain of the old church built in 1610. A Roman altar stone, taken from the 17th century church is built inside the porch of the present church. The new Hoddom parish church, was built in 1817 and recast in 1914.

Trailtrow Chapel once stood on the hill overlooking Hoddom Castle until it was demolished prior to 1565 by Sir John Maxwell of Hoddom. The Repentance Tower was built on the site, however the Murray Mausoleum and other graves are still located near the tower.

== Sport ==
Hoddom Castle is a par 34, 9 nine hole golf course.

== Notable people ==
Basque born professional footballer, Ewan Urain's mother Diane Aird was raised in Hoddom and schooled at Lockerbie Academy.
