= List of listed buildings in Cummertrees, Dumfries and Galloway =

This is a list of listed buildings in the parish of Cummertrees in Dumfries and Galloway, Scotland.

== List ==
Name	Location	Date Listed	Grid Ref. (Note: Sometimes known as OSGB36, the grid reference (where provided) is based on the British national grid reference system used by the Ordnance Survey. • "Guide to National Grid". Ordnance Survey. • "Get-a-map". Ordnance Survey.)	Geo-coordinates	Notes	LB Number (Note: Historic Environment Scotland assign a unique alphanumeric identifier to each designated site in Scotland, for listed buildings this always begins with "LB", for example "LB12345".)	Image
Powfoot Village, Retaining Walls And Bridge, Pow Water				54°58′45″N 3°19′50″W	Category B	6590	Upload Photo
Kinmount, Motor House (Garage Block)				55°00′23″N 3°21′03″W	Category B	3540	Upload Photo
Kinmount, Lodge at Hitchill, with Gates, Gatepiers and Railings				54°59′39″N 3°20′26″W	Category B	3542	Upload Photo
Lindrick Grange (Former Manse), Walled Garden and Old Manse				54°59′23″N 3°21′03″W	Category C(S)	3547	Upload Photo
Powfoot Village, 1-9 Bella Vista (inclusive Nos)				54°58′44″N 3°19′53″W	Category B	3549	Upload another image
Glenstuart				54°59′42″N 3°21′40″W	Category C(S)	3556	Upload Photo
Powfoot Village, 1-8 Ellerslie (inclusive Nos)				54°58′47″N 3°19′53″W	Category B	3566	Upload another image
Powfoot Village, 1-14 (Inclusive Nos) Lake View				54°58′48″N 3°19′57″W	Category B	3568	Upload Photo
1-15 Queensberry Terrace (Inclusive Nos)				54°59′09″N 3°20′16″W	Category B	3569	Upload Photo
Hoddom Castle, Cistern House at Hoddom Mains				55°02′23″N 3°19′02″W	Category C(S)	3577	Upload Photo
Hoddom Castle, Walled Garden, Gardener's House, Hoddom Gardens Cottage and Sheds				55°02′33″N 3°19′41″W	Category B	3579	Upload Photo
Kinmount, Hannah Lodge, Gates, Gatepiers and Railings				54°59′29″N 3°21′04″W	Category B	3539	Upload Photo
Kinmount East Lodge and Gatepiers				55°00′29″N 3°20′09″W	Category B	3545	Upload Photo
Cummertrees Village, Cummertrees Parish Church With Churchyard And Lych Gate				54°59′06″N 3°20′43″W	Category C(S)	3554	Upload Photo
Cummertrees Village, Former Railway Station				54°59′10″N 3°20′50″W	Category B	3555	Upload Photo
Cummertrees Village, Cummertrees Mill, Mill House And Farm Buildings				54°59′06″N 3°20′52″W	Category B	3553	Upload Photo
Hitchill, Farmhouse And Steading Including Barn				54°59′30″N 3°20′30″W	Category B	3557	Upload Photo
Kinmount, Aviary (South West of Mansion)				55°00′18″N 3°20′48″W	Category B	3559	Upload Photo
Repentance Tower				55°02′15″N 3°19′26″W	Category A	3570	Upload another image
Hoddom Castle, Footbridge over River Annan at Mainholm				55°02′50″N 3°19′22″W	Category B	3578	Upload Photo
Hoddom Castle, West Lodge And Gatepiers				55°02′38″N 3°20′01″W	Category B	3581	Upload Photo
Kinmount, Bathing House				55°00′07″N 3°20′25″W	Category B	3583	Upload Photo
Kinmount, Gooley Hill Queensberry Burial Enclosure				55°00′03″N 3°20′24″W	Category B	3584	Upload Photo
Kinmount, Former Stables				55°00′25″N 3°21′00″W	Category B	3585	Upload Photo
Kinmount, West Lodge				55°00′42″N 3°21′12″W	Category B	3546	Upload Photo
Hoddom Castle, Park House				55°02′23″N 3°19′10″W	Category B	3580	Upload Photo
Hoddom Castle with Fosse Bridge and Driveway Bridge to South				55°02′37″N 3°19′20″W	Category A	3558	Upload another image
Powfoot Village, Bridge over Pow Water				54°58′45″N 3°19′50″W	Category C(S)	6591	Upload another image
Kinmount House and Conservatory, with Office Court and Gateways				55°00′19″N 3°20′45″W	Category A	3582	Upload another image
Kinmount, Keeper's Cottage (To West Of Walled Garden)				55°00′40″N 3°21′13″W	Category C(S)	3543	Upload Photo
Kinmount, Queensberry House				55°00′24″N 3°21′09″W	Category B	3544	Upload Photo
Murraythwaite House and Stable Court				55°02′26″N 3°22′02″W	Category B	3548	Upload Photo
Trailtrow Burial Ground And Murray Aisle				55°02′15″N 3°19′25″W	Category B	3571	Upload Photo
Hoddom Castle, Piers To South Of Castle				55°02′37″N 3°19′25″W	Category B	3575	Upload Photo
Kinmount, Gatepiers and Quadrants at Main Drive				55°00′32″N 3°20′18″W	Category B	3541	Upload Photo
Cummertrees Village, Cummertrees House and Steading				54°59′07″N 3°20′43″W	Category C(S)	3552	Upload Photo
Powfoot Village, Holmside				54°58′48″N 3°19′50″W	Category B	3567	Upload Photo
Pow Water Gardens, Powfoot Bowling Pavilion, Powfoot				54°58′45″N 3°19′53″W	Category B	49464	Upload another image

== Key ==
The scheme for classifying buildings in Scotland is:

- Category A: "buildings of national or international importance, either architectural or historic; or fine, little-altered examples of some particular period, style or building type."
- Category B: "buildings of regional or more than local importance; or major examples of some particular period, style or building type, which may have been altered."
- Category C: "buildings of local importance; lesser examples of any period, style, or building type, as originally constructed or moderately altered; and simple traditional buildings which group well with other listed buildings."

In March 2016 there were 47,288 listed buildings in Scotland. Of these, 8% were Category A, and 50% were Category B, with the remaining 42% being Category C.
