= Kinnel Bridge =

Bridge in Dumfries and Galloway, Scotland

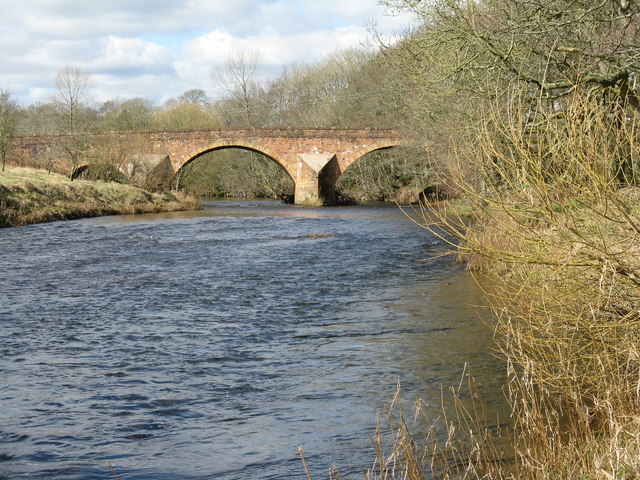
- Bridge over the Kinnel Water
- Coordinates: 55.15102°N 3.43043°W
- OS grid reference: NY 08940 85010
- Carries: B7020
- Crosses: Kinnel Water
- Locale: Dumfries and Galloway
- Maintained by: Transport Scotland

History
- Designer: John Frew
- Construction end: 1723

Listed Building – Category A
- Official name: Kinnel Bridge
- Designated: 2 August 1971
- Reference no.: LB9950

Location
- Interactive map of Kinnel Bridge

The Kinnel Bridge is a road bridge near the Scottish town of Templand, in the council area of Dumfries and Galloway. In 1971 the building was included in the Scottish monument lists in category B. The upgrade to the highest monument category A took place in 1988. Furthermore, the bridge together with the Todhillmuir Cottage forms a monument ensemble of category B.

== History ==
Contracts have been received that demonstrate William Luckup's commitment to the construction of the bridge. A plaque embedded in the bridge, however, identifies John Frew as the builder. That Frew could have built the bridge according to a design by Luckup is given as a possible explanation. The work was completed in 1723. In 1821 the Kinnel Bridge was expanded. The work was carried out by John MacDonald, who had previously gained experience in bridge building with Thomas Telford.

== Description ==
The masonry viaduct, which is made of rubble, is about one kilometer southeast of Templand. It leads the B7020 in three brick segment arches over the Kinnel Water. The two northern arches spanning the Kinnel Water have identical dimensions. The southern, overland arch is smaller. The pointed icebreakers are heavier on the west side. The design of the east side goes back to MacDonald's extensions from 1821. Unlike the bridge, the parapets are made of stone blocks.

== See also ==
- List of bridges in Scotland
