= Anan =

Anan or ANAN may refer to:

== People ==
- Anan (name)

== Places ==
- Anan, Haute-Garonne, a commune in the Haute-Garonne département, France
- Anan, Nagano, a town in Nagano, Japan
- Anan, Tokushima, a city in Tokushima, Japan

== Other uses ==
- Anan (magazine), Japanese
- Ananites, the first Karaites
- Association of National Accountants of Nigeria (ANAN)

== See also ==
- Annan (disambiguation)
- Chok anan, mango
