= Survivor Tree (disambiguation) =

Survivor Tree is an elm tree in Oklahoma City notable for surviving the Oklahoma City bombing.

Survivor Tree may also refer to:

- Survivor Tree (Scotland), a rowan that won the Tree of the Year in 2020
- National September 11 Memorial & Museum#The Survivor Tree, a callery pear that survived the September 11 attacks
- Old Survivor, the last living old-growth coastal redwood in the Berkeley Hills of California
