= Lowther Hills =

Geographical object in Dumfries and Galloway, Scotland

Coordinates: 55.40°N 3.74°W

The Lowther Hills, also sometimes known as the Lowthers, are an extensive area of hill country in the Southern Uplands of Scotland, though some sub-ranges of hills in this area also go under their own local names – see "Hillwalking" below. They form a roughly rhomboidal or lozenge shape on the map with the acute angles being to north and south. It has river valleys along its boundaries to north east (Clydesdale) and south west (Nithsdale) which carry the two largest arterial routes northwards into the west side of the Central Belt of Scotland. A string of small towns have long since developed along these routes. Most of the Lowther Hills lie in the Administrative County of Dumfries and Galloway, though part in the administrative county of South Lanarkshire moves into them around the village of Leadhills and the Daer Reservoir.

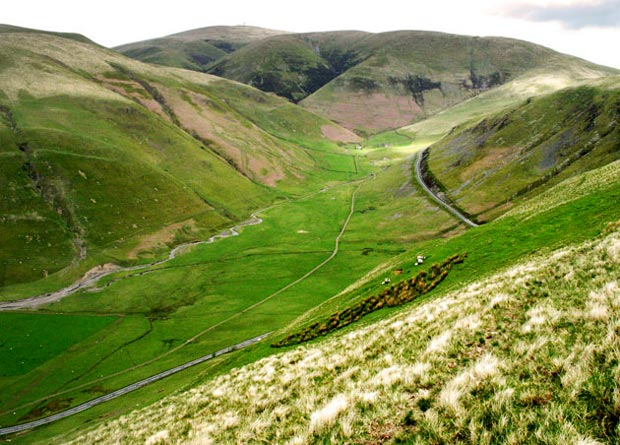
View looking north into the Dalveen Pass from Capel Hill in the Durisdeer Hills with Steygail on the left, Lowther Hill left of centre and Cold Moss right of centre, Upper Dalveen House in the valley catching sunlight, Southern Uplands of Scotland.

== Etymology ==
There is some obscurity surrounding the name Lowther. Derivation from the early Irish lothur meaning "a canal, a trench", in this sense "a pass between hills", has been suggested.

== North-east and south-west boundaries ==
It is some 30 kilometres across the rhomboid as the crow flies from the town of Sanquhar just to the west of the Lowthers to the towns of Beattock and Moffat on the east and some 28 kilometres from the town of Thornhill near the southern apex to Abington near the northern one. Sanquhar and Thornhill lie on the River Nith, Moffat on the River Annan and Abington on the River Clyde. Annandale and Clydesdale taken together, form a corridor between the Lowther Hills and the Moffat Hills (which lie to the east.). This corridor between the hills carries the main route running northwards into Scotland on its west side. It carries both the west coast railway line and the M74 motorway and has been the main route north over centuries. Nithsdale to the west of the Lowthers carries both the A76 road and the rail line from Dumfries to Kilmarnock. The next range of hills to the west beyond the River Nith is the Carsphairn and Scaur Hills.

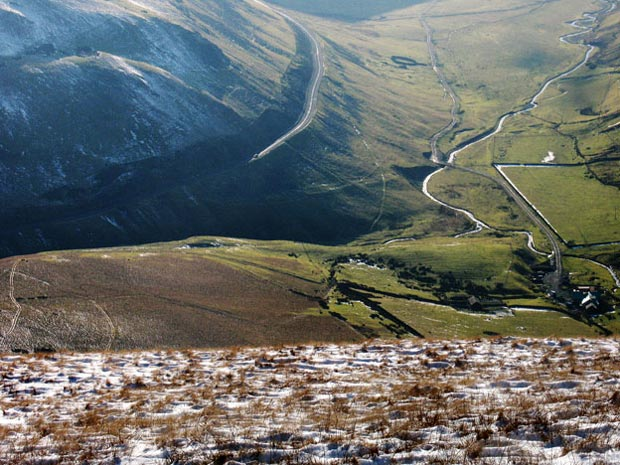
View into the Dalveen Pass (looking South) from Cold Moss in the Lowther Hills, Upper Dalveen House right foreground, Southern Uplands of Scotland.

== North-west and south-east boundaries ==
The north west boundary of the hills runs up the Crawick Water in a north easterly direction from where the Crawick Water runs into the River Nith. This boundary follows the B740 road through Crawfordjohn and connects to the old trunk road north which was used before the M74 was built on its present route. North of the B740 the hills gradually drop out into the Central Lowlands of Scotland though Tinto is an outlier 11 kilometres north of Abington. The south east boundary of the hills is formed by the Forest of Ae which is one of the largest forests in Britain at 10,000 hectares. A continuous band of trees runs, again in a north easterly direction, from Auldgirth on the River Nith (9 kilometres south of Thornhill), for some 26 kilometres till it meets the M74 motorway 10 kilometres north of Beattock. Continuing south of Ae leads into the plain that surrounds the town of Dumfries.

== Hill Passes ==
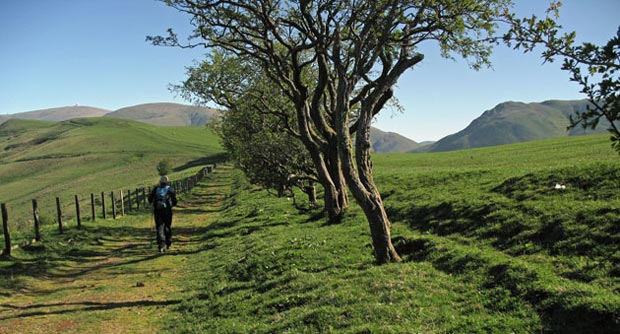
Heading north on the ancient bridle path to the Enterkin Pass with Lowther Hill on left edge, Pettylung (Durisdeer Hills) on right and the Dalveen Pass between them. Southern Uplands of Scotland.

There are three road passes running in a north easterly direction diagonally through the Lowthers linking the A76 trunk road to the M74 motorway, and several 'ancient passes' now followed by paths or tracks.

=== Dalveen Pass ===
Dalveen Pass is the most southerly and the longest pass within the Lowther Hills. It runs from Carronbridge on the A76 just north of Thornhill to Elvanfoot near the M74 and carries the A702 trunk road. The road passes near the village of Durisdeer en route and reaches a height of 350 metres at the top of the pass. It is the only pass enlarged by ice into a U-shaped glacial trough, hence the road has to climb up the steep side to gain the head.

=== Mennock Pass ===
The Mennock Pass carries the B797 which runs from the small village of Mennock on the A76 to Abington near the M74, passing through the villages of Wanlockhead and Leadhills. The B797 reaches to a height of 467 metres as it leaves Wanlockhead – which is the highest village in Scotland.

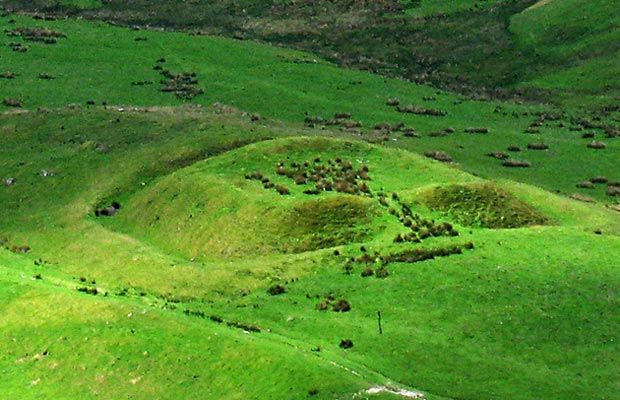
Roman Fortlet from Durisdeer Rig – Southern Uplands of Scotland.

=== Crawick Pass ===
Crawick Pass is the most northerly of the three passes and carries the B740 from Crawick to Crawfordjohn and on to the M74. The Crawick is the shortest of the three passes without the steep ascents and overarching hills that characterise the other two. It is also the lowest of the three reaching a maximum height of 288 metres.

=== Ancient Passes ===
There was another pass from Durisdeer through to Wanlockhead called the Enterkin Pass which was an old pack horse route through the hills from Dumfries to Glasgow. It has been argued by H.R.G. Inglis (1924) that this route was used mainly for extracting lead to the Solway coast and was never viable as a main route north because of its height. There is no road through there now though there is a track for walkers into the centre of the hills. The Enterkin Pass was the location of a 1684 Covenanter ambush of a party of Dragoons during the Killing Time

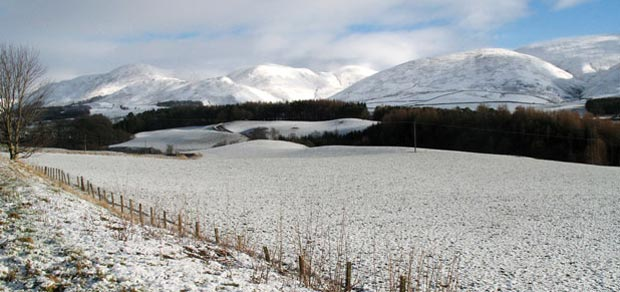
Durisdeer Hills from the A702. Durisdeer Village nestles into the foot of the glen in the middle of the picture and the Roman fortlet is at the foot of the glen just beyond the village. The hill catching the sunlight is Penbane with Well Hill beyond it also in sunlight, Black Hill is to the left and Durisdeer Hill to the right with its shoulder Durisdeer Rig running towards us. Durisdeer Hills Southern Uplands of Scotland.

The Romans built a road through from their fortlet near Durisdeer on a route which takes a more direct route to the head of the pass than is offered by the Dalveen Pass. Inglis calls this route Well Path and he considers this to have been on the main pilgrimage route from Edinburgh to Whithorn and one of the main ancient routes northwards through the Southern Uplands.

=== Geology and Scenery of the Passes ===
The Lowther Hills are composed of resistant Ordovician shales, heavily compressed and contorted in the Caledonian mountain-building orogeny. The headwaters of the River Nith incise them deeply on the south, as the Nith falls much more steeply (to the nearby Solway Firth) than does the Clyde on the north. The flanks of the heavily glaciated Dalveen Pass and of the deep, steep-sided Enterkin Pass are both lined with rock slope failures (large landslips and landslides), with a deep V-shaped notch linking these passes being a probable overflow channel cut by glacial meltwaters. The original source of the Clyde is inferred to have been here, captured to the Nith by the Dalveen trough-head.

== Durisdeer and its Church ==
The village of Durisdeer sits at some distance from the A702, nestling tightly into the foot of Durisdeer Hill at the bottom of the pass through the hills that the Romans used. The Duke of Buccleuch, the largest private landowner in Britain, owns much of the land for many miles around this area and has a castle at Drumlanrig on the west bank of the River Nith some 5 kilometres north of Thornhill. In the church at Durisdeer there is a mausoleum to the first Duke of Buccleuch complete with marble statues of him and his wife Mary dating from 1713 though there has been a church on this site since medieval times.

== Source of the Clyde ==
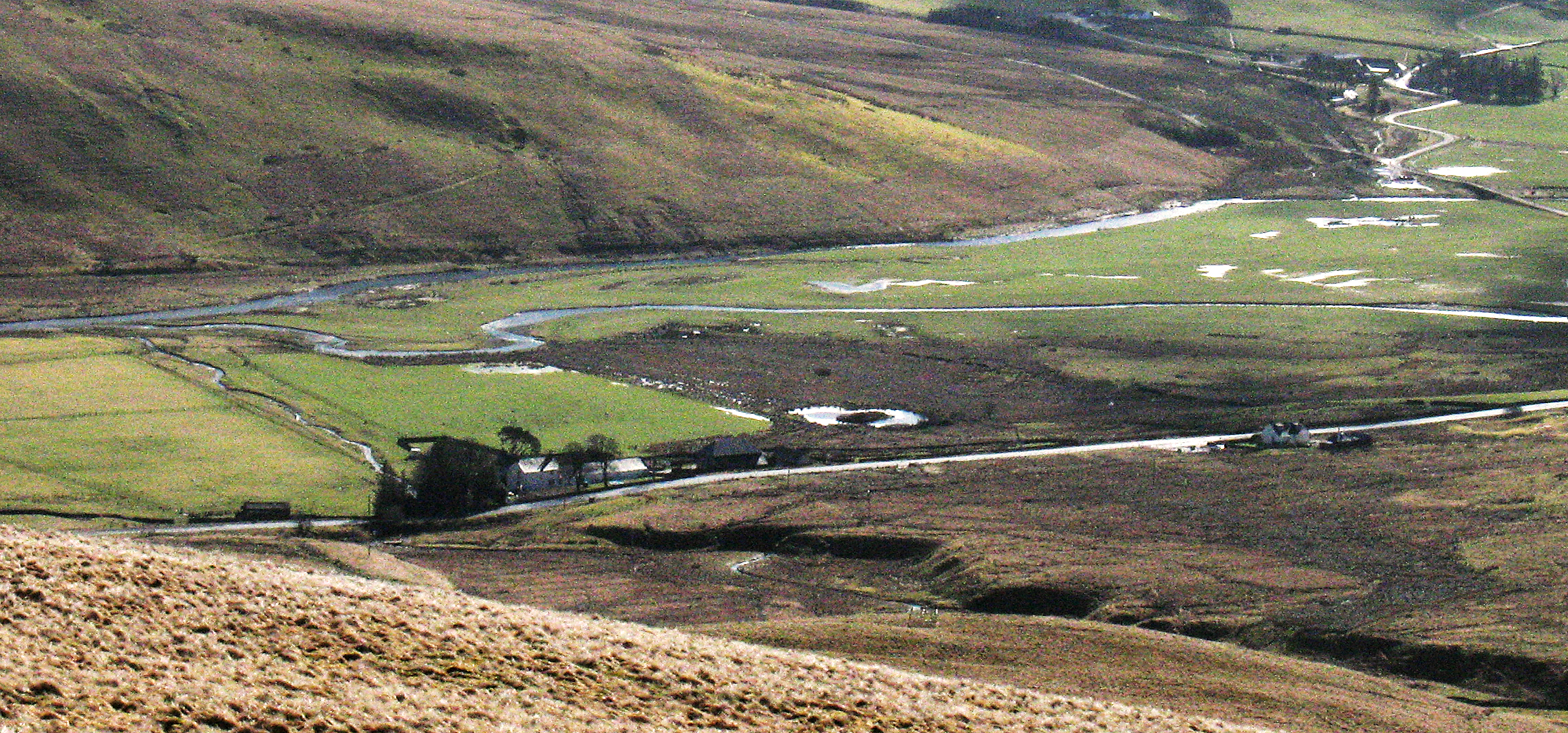
Source of the River Clyde (on the left of the picture) where the Daer Water (coming in from the top right) meets the Potrail Water (coming in from the middle of the right side), The A702 and Glenochar Farmhouse are in the foreground. Glenochar Bastle and Fermtoun are just out of the picture on the bottom right. Southern Uplands of Scotland.

Approaching Elvanfoot on the A702, Glenochar farmhouse is reached. Just to the north, there is Glenochar Bastle and Fermtoun a 17th-century settlement and fortified house. The archaeological dig which revealed this was the winner of the 1997 Pitt Rivers Award for amateur archaeologists. Also, just to the south is the source of the River Clyde which flows north through Lanarkshire and passes through the City of Glasgow. Where the Daer and Potrail Waters confluence, the River Clyde begins. The Daer Water has its head waters near Queensberry and it flows through Daer Reservoir before it meets the Potrail. The head waters of the Potrail are on the north east side of Durisdeer Hill.

== God's Treasure House in Scotland ==
The fact that there are two villages nearly 500 metres up in a desolate hillside in the Southern Uplands of Scotland requires some explanation: because of the rich variety of minerals to be found here, this area became known as "God's Treasure House in Scotland". Notably, it has produced some of the world's purest gold (22.8 carats) which was used in the manufacture of the Scottish Crown Jewels – dating from the 15th and 16th centuries. The name "Leadhills" testifies to the fact that this area was chiefly known for its lead mining; and there is a lead mining museum in nearby Wanlockhead. Leadhills has the oldest subscription library in the UK (founded by miners in 1741), and was the birthplace of the 18th century poet Allan Ramsay, whose son, also Allan Ramsay, was the leading portrait painter in Britain in the mid 18th century. The Leadhills & Wanlockhead Railway is a preserved former industrial narrow-gauge railway line.

== Hillwalking ==
The Lowther Hills can be split into a northern and southern section. The northern section would generally be taken to mean the string of tops lying between the Dalveen Pass and the Mennock Pass and running south eastward from near Elvanfoot over Lousie Wood Law, White Law, Dun Law, Dungrain Law, Peden Head, Green Lowther, Lowther Hill, East Mount Lowther, Thirstane Hill and Steygail which dominates the steepest part of the Dalveen Pass on its northern side. Green Lowther is the highest point of the Lowther Hills area and, like Lowther Hill, has a Civil Aviation Authority aircraft tracking station on the summit. The huge white 'golf ball' on the top of Lowther Hill can be seen from many miles away in all directions. The Southern Upland Way passes over the top of Lowther Hill – the highest point of the entire route. The southern portion would generally be taken to mean the lower but more expansive hills which lie between the Dalveen Pass and the Forest of Ae, the highest point of which is Queensberry. Mitchellslacks, on the northern edge of the Forest Ae, and which provides access to Queensberry, along with nearby Locherben, were the homes of the Harknesses involved in the Covenanter ambush. They also offer views into the northern Lowthers, Nithsdale and Annandale.

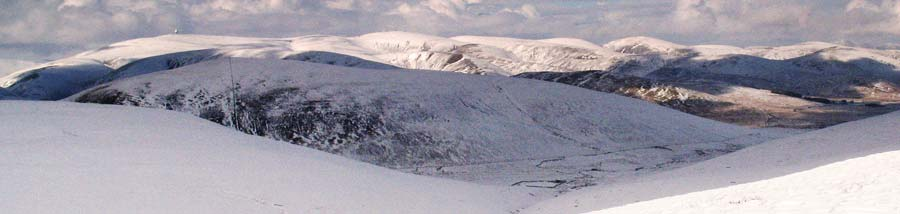
Lowther Hills from Scaw'd Law in the Durisdeer Hills. Lowther Hill (with ball on top) left of the ridge and Cold Moss in front of it, Green Lowther middle of the picture (also with masts on top), Dun Law one third in from right and Lousie Wood Law on right. Well Hill is the very prominent hill running across the picture much nearer to us and the Roman road also runs across the picture below Well Hill. The Roman road meets the A702 beyond Well Hill on the right of the picture. Potrail Water (one of the principal sources of the River Clyde) rises from little burns running out of the glen leading down from Scaw'd Law in the immediate foreground. The Southern Uplands of Scotland.

== Snowsports ==
The Lowther Hills are one of the birthplaces of Scottish winter sports. Curling in the Lowthers can be traced back to 1777, when the Wanlockhead Curling Society –one of Scotland's first Curling societies- was created. Scotland's first boys' Curling club was established in Wanlockhead in 1883. The sport remained popular in the area until the 1930s. Since the 1920s skiing in the Lowther Hills has been organised intermittently by a succession of local residents as well as several non-for-profit sports clubs. Lowther Hill is home to the only ski area in the south of Scotland, and Scotland's only community-owned ski centre. Operated by Lowther Hills Ski Club, the ski centre runs three ski lifts above the villages of Leadhills and Wanlockhead for beginners and intermediate skiers.
