= East Mount Lowther =

Hill in Dumfries and Galloway, Scotland

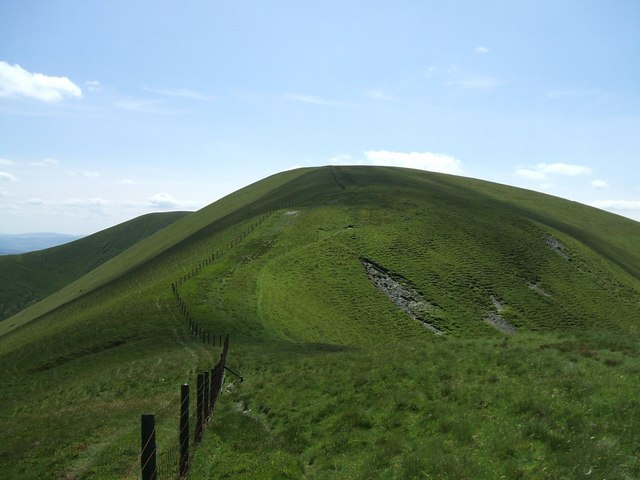

Highest point
- Elevation: 631 m (2,070 ft)
- Prominence: 75 m (246 ft)
- Listing: Tu,Sim,D,GT,DN

Geography
- Location: Dumfries and Galloway, Scotland
- Parent range: Lowther Hills, Southern Uplands
- OS grid: NS 87857 09989
- Topo map: OS Landranger 71, 78

East Mount Lowther is a hill in the Lowther Hills range, part of the Southern Uplands of Scotland. The hill is most often climbed as a detour before or after ascending Lowther Hill, however much longer approaches from the south utilising ancient pathways such as the medieval Enterkin Pass are also possible - a viewpoint indicator is located at the summit.
