= Annadale =

Annadale may refer to:

- Annadale, Shimla, India, a suburb
- Annadale, Staten Island, New York, a neighborhood
  - Annadale (Staten Island Railway station)
- Annadale (North Vernon, Indiana), U.S., a historic home
- Annadale, South Australia, a locality
- Annadale Grammar School, Belfast, Northern Ireland
- Annadale, South Africa, pre-urban human settlement in South Africa

== See also ==
- Annandale (disambiguation)
