= Carrifran Wildwood =

Long-term rewilding project in Scotland

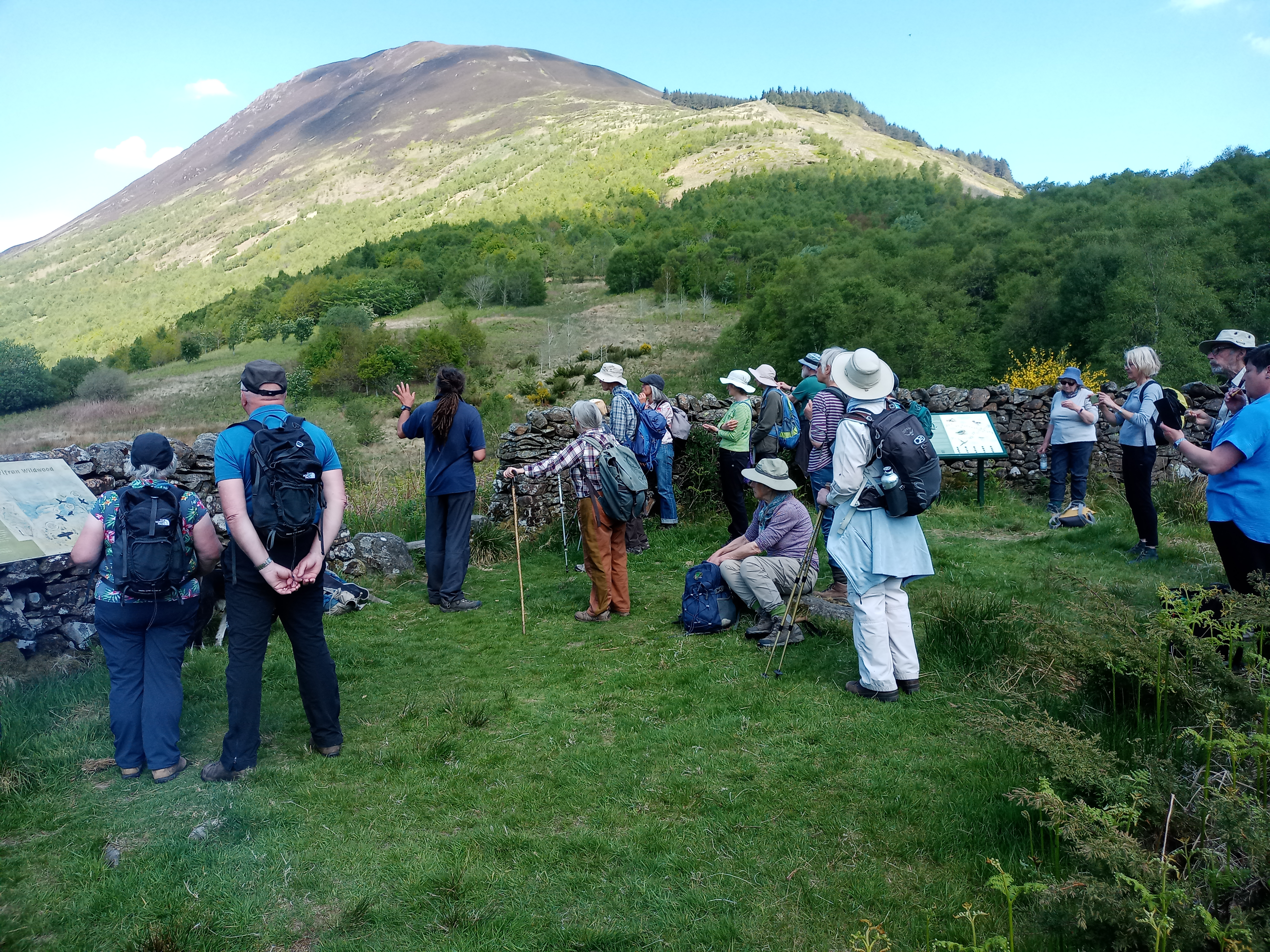
Borders Organic Gardeners seeing the progress in May 2025

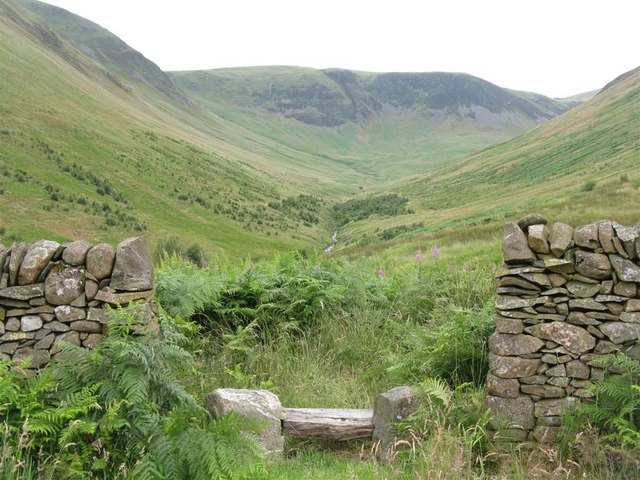
Carrifran in 2009 (after more than a decade of planting, the glen is now much more established.

The Carrifran Wildwood is a project by the Borders Forest Trust (BFT) to re-establish native woodland and the associated ecology within Carrifran, a glen north east of Moffat in the Moffat Hills, part of the Southern Uplands of Scotland.

== History ==
The project was initially conceived in 1993 by members of the Peeblesshire Environmental Concern group, aiming to restore a whole catchment area to a pre-agricultural standard. 1995 saw the formation of the Wildwood Group who then formed the BFT the following year in 1996. No public money was used in the purchase of the 1500 acres, totalling nearly £400,000; instead all funds were donated by private individuals and charitable trusts. Primarily 600 people gave £200 each before the word "rewilding" and "crowdfunding" had become part of the vocabulary. The first trees were planted on 1 January 2000, the same day that the land was officially acquired. The project formed to create Carrigan Wood has been credited with inspiring other British communities to launch similar rewilding projects.

Over 750,000 trees and shrubs were strategically planted according to the management plan in the first 24 years by volunteers and annual contractors. Several thousand trees were still planted annually by BFT work party volunteers in 2021, primarily around the upper rim of the glen. The focus of work later moved to the adjacent 'Corehead and Devil's Beef Tub' and 'Talla and Gameshope' areas, acquired in 2009 and 2013 respectively. Together, these three areas in the Moffat Hills are known as 'The Wild Heart of Southern Scotland'.

== Outcomes ==
Most of the planting in the glen is now finished and the woodland will take many years to fully establish. Despite this a number of changes have already been seen:

"Foxes and badgers are now common and otters, stoats and weasels are also present. Kestrels, buzzards, peregrines and ravens are regularly seen (as previously) and there are occasional records of short-eared, long-eared and barn owls. There are large increases in willow warblers and chaffinches, and many other woodland and scrub species such as blackcap, long-tailed tit, siskin, lesser redpoll, reed bunting and tree pipit are gradually establishing themselves. Ring ouzels are variable in occurrence but black grouse have maintained a good population, recently with eight regularly displaying males."

== Etymology ==
'Carrifran' is thought to at least be Cumbric in the final syllable, likely denoting a raven; nearby features support this. With 'caer' translating to fort, 'Caer-y-fran' is frequently suggested, translating to 'Fort of the Raven'.

== Other information ==
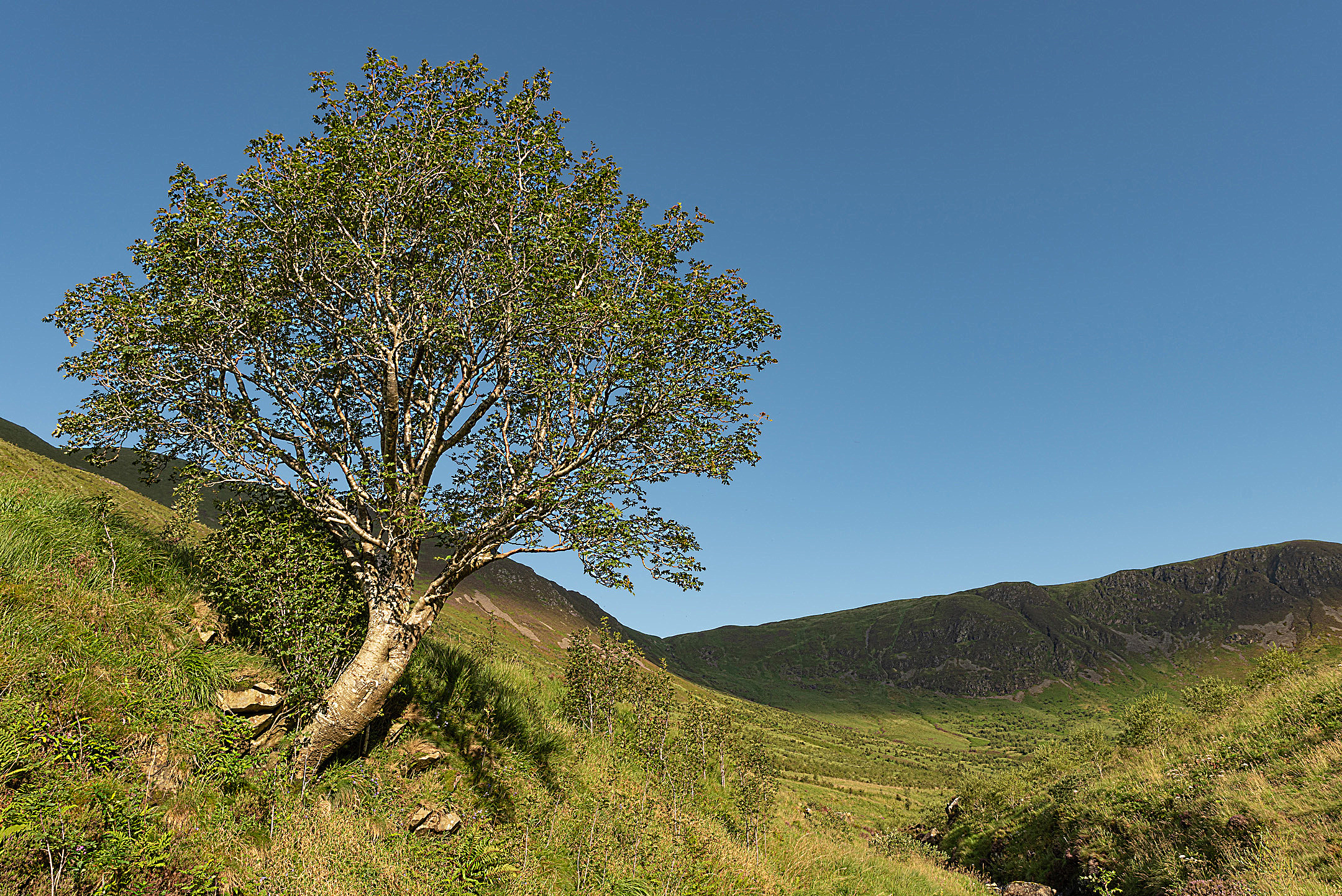
The 'Survivor Tree'

The book, The Carrifran Wildwood Story: Ecological Restoration from the Grass Roots, written by Myrtle and Philip Ashmole, who were central in the wildwood's development, was published in 2009 and details the history of the project from its inception to 2009.

The 'Survivor Tree', a remnant Sorbus aucuparia (Rowan) tree, one of the few remaining trees in the glen prior to restoration, was voted Scotland's Tree of the Year in 2020, an award given to exceptional trees nominated by the public. It competed as a finalist in the European Tree of the Year competition for 2021, placing 11th.
