= Green Lowther =

Hill in South Lanarkshire, Scotland

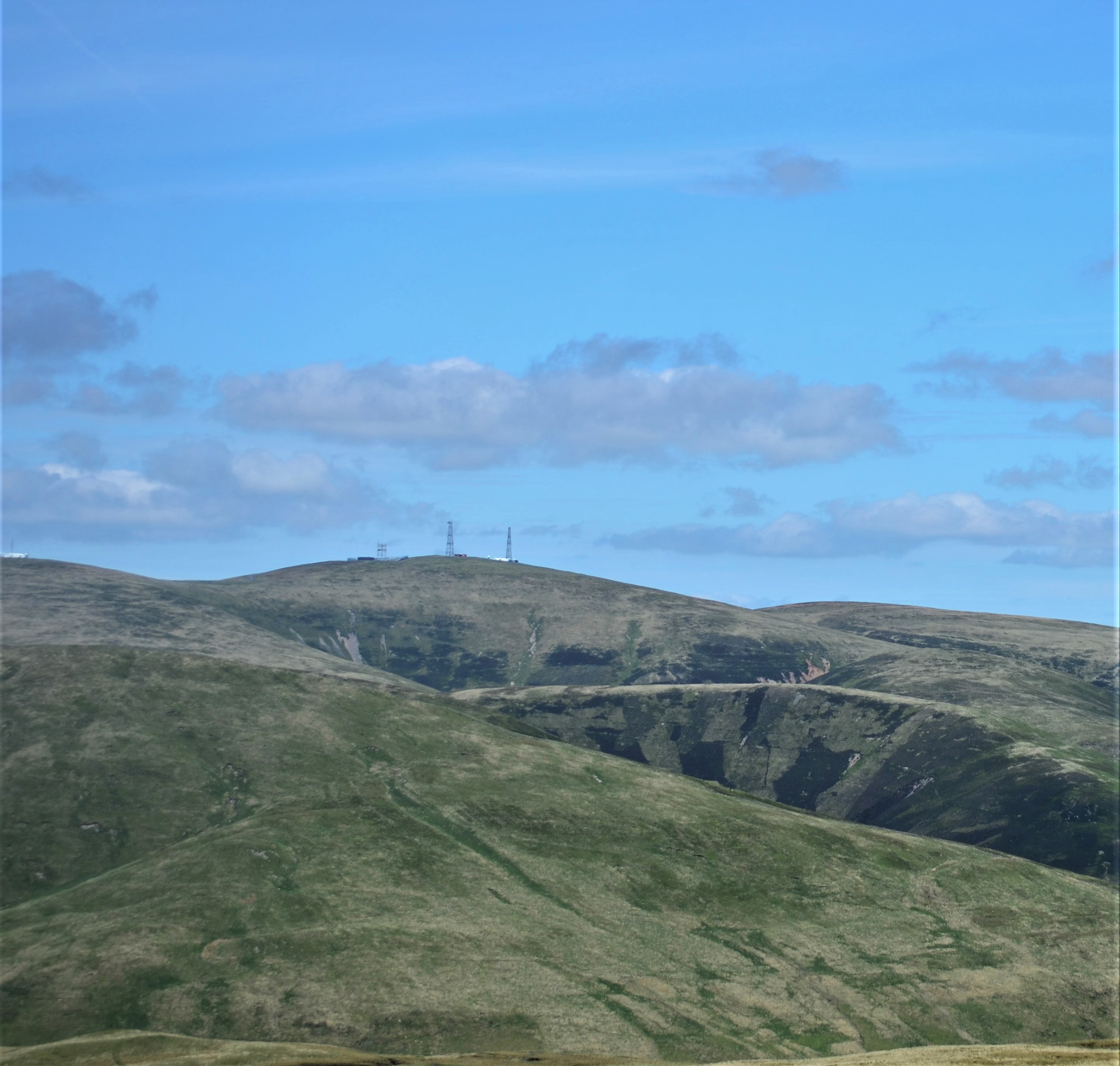

Highest point
- Elevation: 732 m (2,402 ft)
- Prominence: 424 m (1,391 ft)
- Listing: Ma,Hu,Tu,Sim, G, D,DN,Y
- Coordinates: 55°23′24″N 3°44′15″W

Geography
- Location: South Lanarkshire, Scotland
- Parent range: Lowther Hills, Southern Uplands
- OS grid: NS 90037 12027
- Topo map: OS Landranger 71, 78

Green Lowther is a hill in the Lowther Hills range, part of the Southern Uplands of Scotland. It is the highest point of the Lowther Hills and lies in Lanarkshire, east of the town of Sanquhar. A microwave array once stood at the summit, however a telecommunications mast remains next to a transmitter station. The private service road which makes its way up neighbouring Lowther Hill, continuing over Green Trough to the summit is the second highest paved road in Britain after Great Dun Fell in the Pennines and the highest road of any kind in Scotland.

== Subsidiary SMC Summits ==
Summit	Height (m)	Listing
Cold Moss	628	Tu,Sim,DT,GT,DN
