= Lousie Wood Law =

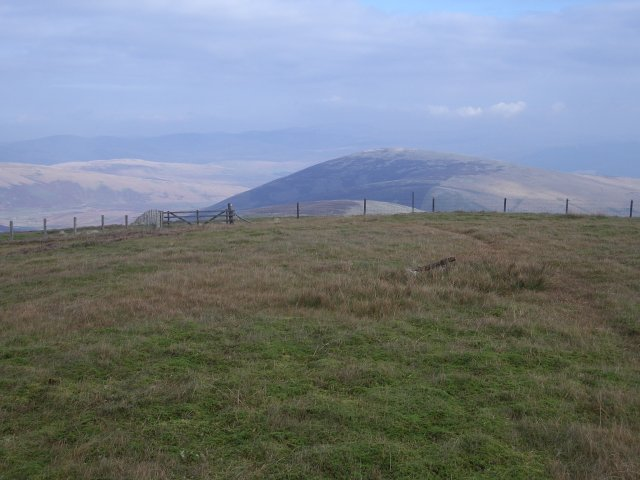

Highest point
- Elevation: 619 m (2,031 ft)
- Prominence: 123 m (404 ft)
- Listing: Hu,Tu,Sim,D,GT,DN,Y

Geography
- Location: South Lanarkshire, Scotland
- Parent range: Lowther Hills, Southern Uplands
- OS grid: NS 93203 15259
- Topo map: OS Landranger 71, 78

Lousie Wood Law is a hill in the Lowther Hills range, part of the Southern Uplands of Scotland. The terminal northeast Donald on the main ridge in the northern portion of the Lowthers range, it is most easily climbed from its northern and eastern flanks.
