= Philip Ashmole =

English zoologist and conservationist

- Born: Nelson Philip Ashmole; January 11, 1934 (age 92)
- Citizenship: United Kingdom
- Spouse: Myrtle Jane Goodacre
- Children: 3
- Awards: Order of the British Empire; Lifetime Achievement Award
- Scientific career
- Fields: zoologist and conservationist

Nelson Philip Ashmole (born 11 January 1934 in Amersham, Buckinghamshire), commonly known as Philip Ashmole, is a British zoologist and conservationist. His main research field focused on the avifauna of islands, including Saint Helena, Ascension Island, Tenerife, the Azores, and Kiritimati. Other interests include insects and spiders, of which Ashmole discovered and described some new taxa.

In 2002, Philip and wife and his long time collaborator Myrtle Ashmole were presented with the Lifetime Achievement Award of the Pacific Seabird Group, and in 2015 they received the Lifetime Achievement Award at the RSPB Nature of Scotland Awards. Ashmole was appointed a Member of the Order of the British Empire (MBE) "[f]or Services to Nature" in the King's 2026 New Year Honours.

== Career ==
In 1957, Ashmole graduated with a Bachelor of Arts degree in zoology from Brasenose College, University of Oxford. In the same year, he became a research student at the Edward Grey Institute of Field Ornithology (EGI) and accompanied the scientists Bernard and Sally Stonehouse, and the ornithologist Doug Dorward on a two-year expedition of the British Ornithologists' Union to Ascension Island in the South Atlantic. Here, Ashmole studied the breeding and moult cycles of terns, about which he wrote in his Oxford doctoral thesis, The Biology of Certain Terns: With Special Reference to Black Noddy Anous tenuirostris and the Wideawake Sterna fuscata on Ascension Island. In 1960, Ashmole married Myrtle Jane Goodacre, whom he had met at a students' conference in 1957. Myrtle Goodacre worked as researcher and librarian at the EGI and became Ashmole's collaborator in many research projects. The couple has one son and two daughters.

After his doctorate, Ashmole worked as demonstrator at the University of Oxford. He also was active as a research officer at the EGI until 1963. Through the mediation of David Lack, who worked with G. Evelyn Hutchinson at the EGI, Ashmole received a summer research fellowship at the Peabody Museum of Yale University. Subsequently, the Ashmoles spent a year in Hawaii on a Yale fellowship at the Bernice P. Bishop Museum from where they studied feeding ecology and breeding cycles of terns and other seabirds on Kiritimati, as well as trying to assess the effects of nuclear weapons testing on sea birds. Ashmole then served as assistant and associate professor at Yale University, where he conducted research until 1972. From 1972 to 1992, he held the post of lecturer and senior lecturer at the University of Edinburgh.

Ashmole collected subfossil material of extinct bird species, including the Saint Helena hoopoe, the Ascension night heron and the Ascension crake. During a month-long research period on fossil birds on Saint Helena in 1959, Ashmole and his colleague Doug Dorward discovered the forceps pincers of the Saint Helena earwig, a species which was rediscovered in 1965 for a short term.

Ashmole and his wife are also active in the nature conservation movement, most notably the restoration of Carrifran Wildwood in the Southern Uplands of Scotland. For that and other projects, the Ashmoles helped to found the Borders Forest Trust, an environmental charity, in 1996, of which Ashmole has been a long-serving trustee.

In 2002, Philip and his wife were presented with the Lifetime Achievement Award of the Pacific Seabird Group, and in 2015, Philip and Myrtle Ashmole received the Lifetime Achievement Award at the RSPB Nature of Scotland Awards.

Myrtle Ashmole died on 27 April 2025 and is remembered as "A champion of Nature and a Starter of Things".

== Ashmole's halo ==
Ashmole's work on Ascension Island led him to propose a hypothesis about how large concentrations of seabirds might be able to deplete forage fish resources in the vicinity of their breeding colonies, creating a zone of reduced food availability that would influence foraging and breeding success and behaviour. This zone was later termed "Ashmole's halo" by other researchers. The concept has since been widely used in ecological studies of seabirds, and found to apply in varying degrees to many different species and ecological regions.

== Selected works ==
- P. Ashmole, M. Ashmole: Comparative Feeding Ecology of Sea Birds of a Tropical Oceanic Island. Peabody Museum of Natural History, Yale University, 1967
- M. Ashmole, P. Ashmole: Natural history excursions in Tenerife: A guide to the countryside, plants and animals. Kidston Mill Press, 1989. ISBN 0951454404
- P. Ashmole, M. Ashmole: St. Helena and Ascension Island: a natural history. Anthony Nelson, Oswestry, 2000. ISBN 0904614611
- M. Ashmole, P. Ashmole: The Carrifran Wildwood Story: Ecological Restoration from the Grass Roots, Borders Forest Trust, 2009. ISBN 0953434648
- P. Ashmole, M. Ashmole: Natural History of Tenerife, Whittles Publishing, Dunbeath, 2016. ISBN 978-184995-225-5
- P. Ashmole, M. Ashmole (editors): A Journey in Landscape Restoration: Carrifran Wildwood and Beyond , 2020
