= Dryfe Water =

Coordinates: 55°07′N 3°24′W

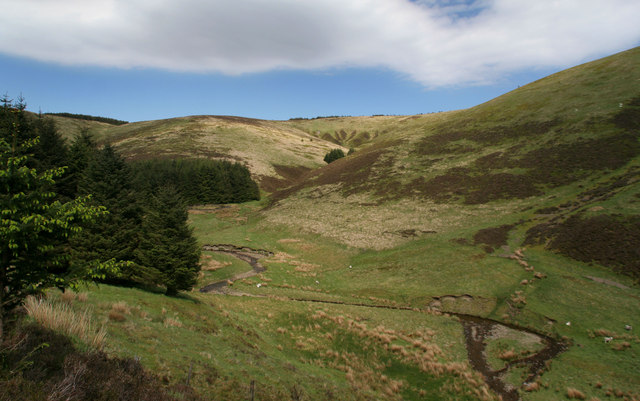
Dryfe Water Valley

Dryfe Water is a river in Scotland about 18 miles in length which flows into the River Annan at grid reference NY 107 820, near Lockerbie. It starts at NT 170 041 on the southern slopes of Loch Fell, near Moffat, and then flows along a narrow valley to the Annan.

The mixed ash woodland growing alongside Dryfe Water has been designated a Site of Special Scientific Interest due to its distinctive nature within Annandale.

Dryfe Water gives its name to the parish, Dryfesdale, and the common Scottish surname, Drysdale. A second name is the much less common surname Dryfe (or Drife). The meaning of the word Dryfe is unknown. It may be from the Old Norse, Anglo-Saxon or Brittonic languages which were all used at different times in Dumfriesshire.
