= Raehills House =

Mansion in Scotland

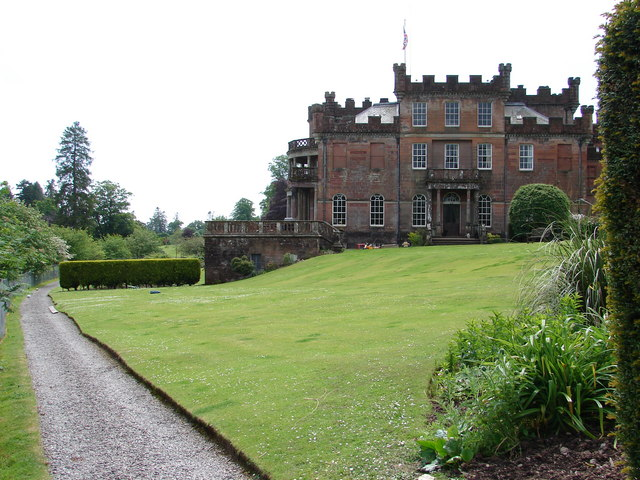

- Location of the house within Dumfries and Galloway
- 55°14′3.5″N 3°28′25.5″W
- Type: Mansion
- Location: Johnstonebridge

Listed Building – Category A
- Official name: Raehills House
- Designated: 3 August 1988
- Reference no.: LB9898

Inventory of Gardens and Designed Landscapes in Scotland
- Official name: Raehills
- Designated: 30 June 1987
- Reference no.: GDL00322

Raehills House is a mansion located near the Scottish town of Johnstonebridge in the council area of Dumfries and Galloway. In 1971, the building was first included in Category B in the Scottish monument lists. The upgrade to the highest monument category A took place in 1988. Furthermore, the property is listed in the Scottish register for landscape gardens.

== History ==
In the early 18th century, the lands of Raehills came into the possession of William Johnstone, 1st Marquess of Annandale. It was inherited within the family. George Vanden-Bempde, 3rd Marquess of Annandale commissioned the architect Alexander Stevens to build Raehills House around 1786. After his death, it passed to James Hope-Johnstone, 3rd Earl of Hopetoun. That year, he commissioned the gardens and parks. Architect William Burn was responsible for the redesign and expansion around 1830. Raehills House continues to be inherited within the family.

== Description ==
Raehills House is located in the northeast of Dumfries and Galloway approximately four kilometers northwest of Johnstonebridge. The Kinnel Water runs a few hundred meters to the east . Raehills House originally had an L-shaped floor plan, but after the extensions it is more of an elongated area. Stevens' style was based on Robert Adam's work . This is how Raehills House is designed with all-round battlement reinforcement, which largely hides the slate-roofed roofs behind it. The edges of the building are also passed by corner tourists . The arched portalon the south side was designed by Burns and was integrated into a three-story tower. On the south side, a further, column-supported balcony emerges.
