= Crown of Scotland (hill) =

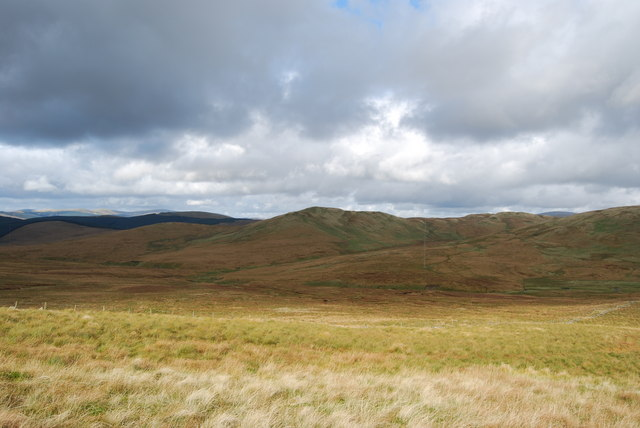
- Crown of Scotland

Highest point
- Elevation: 538 m (1,765 ft)
- Coordinates: 55.38145°N 3.46492°W

Geography
- Location within Scotland
- OS grid: NT081150

Geology
- Mountain type: sub Donald Dewey

The Crown of Scotland is a hill in the Scottish Borders, Scotland.

At a relatively small elevation from the surrounding peaks, it is situated to the north of the Devil's Beef Tub and the town of Moffat.

The hill's unusual name derives from the alliance made between Robert the Bruce and James Douglas, Lord of Douglas upon its summit in 1306, following the former's murder of the Red Comyn at Greyfriars kirk in Dumfries, and when Bruce was on his way to Scone to be crowned by Bishop William de Lamberton.

== Development ==
In 2008 a planning application was made to erect 36 wind turbines concentrated on the summit and its surrounding peaks. This application was rejected following much local objection. Currently (December 2011) a revised plan for 24 turbines is in process.
