= Abraham Annan =

Ghanaian international footballer

Abe Annan
Personal information
- Full name: Abraham Annan Adjei
- Date of birth: 8 December 1988 (age 37)
- Place of birth: Shema, Ghana
- Position: Midfielder

Team information
- Current team: Heart of Lions

Youth career
- 2002–2005: Heart of Lions

Senior career*
Years	Team	Apps	(Gls)
2005–	Heart of Lions	38	(2)

International career^{‡}
2009–	Ghana	1	(0)
- * Club domestic league appearances and goals as of 12:52, 15 October 2009 (UTC) ‡ National team caps and goals as of 12:52, 15 October 2009 (UTC)

Abraham Annan Adjei (born 8 December 1988) is a Ghanaian international footballer. He currently plays as a midfielder for Heart of Lions.

== Career ==
Born in Shema, Annan began his career with Heart of Lions, and had a trial in May 2008 with English side Leeds United.

== International career ==
Annan made his international debut on 1 October 2009 against Argentina.
