= Queensberry (hill) =

Hill in Dumfries and Galloway, Scotland

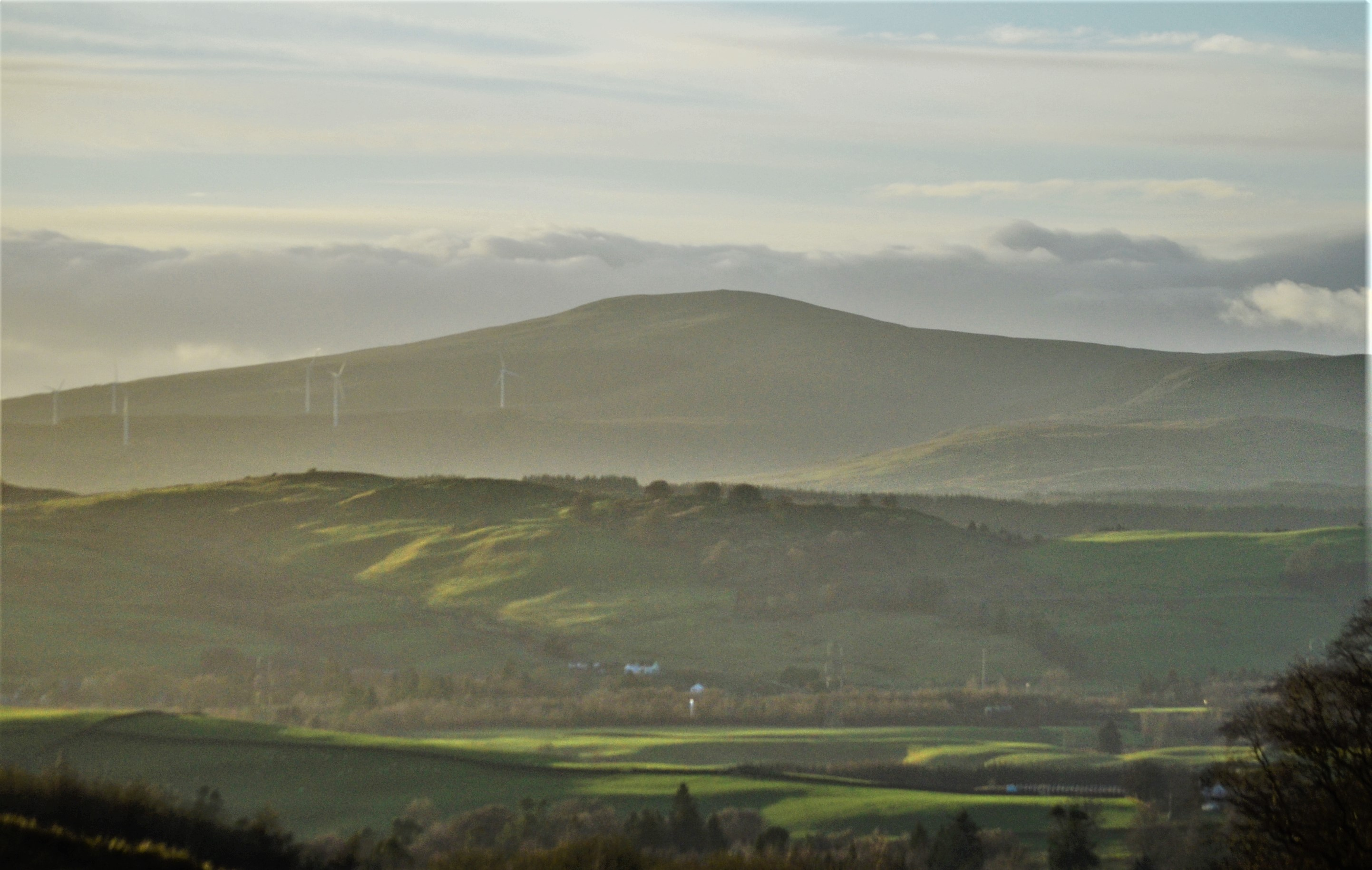

Highest point
- Elevation: 697 m (2,287 ft)
- Prominence: 212 m (696 ft)
- Listing: Ma,Hu,Tu,Sim, G, D,DN,Y
- Coordinates: 55.28192°N 3.59321°W

Geography
- Location: Southern Uplands, Scotland
- Parent range: Lowther Hills, Southern Uplands
- OS grid: NX 98909 99746
- Topo map: OS Landranger 78

Queensberry is a hill in the Lowther Hills range, part of the Southern Uplands of Scotland. The most southerly mountain in the range, it lies in the parish of Kirkpatrick-Juxta and is a prominent landmark throughout Dumfriesshire. It is frequently climbed from the Daer Reservoir to the north and the minor roads to its south and east. As well as being a placename of multiple addresses throughout southern Scotland, the hill also lend its name to the Duke of Queensberry and Marquess of Queensberry peerages and, subsequently, 'Queensberry Rules' in the sport of boxing.
