= Richard Annan =

English footballer

Personal information
- Full name: Richard Amondo Annan
- Date of birth: 4 December 1968 (age 57)
- Place of birth: Leeds, England
- Position: Left back

Senior career*
Years	Team	Apps	(Gls)
1986–1987	Leeds United	0	(0)
1987–1988	Doncaster Rovers	0	(0)
1990–1992	Guiseley		
1992–1994	Crewe Alexandra	19	(1)
1994–1995	Guiseley		
1995–1996	Halifax Town	21	(0)
1996–1997	Morecambe	18	(0)
1997–1999	Hyde United	65	(3)
2000–2001	Guiseley		
2003–2004	Farsley Celtic		
- * Club domestic league appearances and goals

Richard Amondo Annan (born 4 December 1968) is an English former professional footballer who played in the Football League as a left back.
