= Annadale, South Africa =

Pre-urban human settlement

Ladanna
- City
- Annadale
- Location within Limpopo Location within South Africa Location within Africa Location within Earth
- Coordinates: 23.877595°S 29.445733°E
- Country: South Africa
- Province: Limpopo
- District: Capricorn
- Municipality: Polokwane Municipality
- Main Place: Polokwane

Government
  - Executive Mayor: Thembi Nkadimeng (ANC)
  - Mayor: John Mpe

Area
  - Total: 1.66 km^{2} (0.64 sq mi)

Population (2011)
  - Total: 6,386
  - Density: 3,850/km^{2} (9,960/sq mi)
- Demonym: Dales

Racial makeup (2011)
  - Black African: 58.30%
  - White: 39.13%
  - Coloured: 1.82%
  - Indian/Asian: 0.47%
  - Other: 0.28%

First languages (2011)
  - Afrikaans: 38.24%
  - Sepedi: 28.12%
  - Venda: 8.47%
  - Xitsonga: 8.25%
  - English: 7.45%
  - Other: 9.46%
- Time zone: UTC+2 (SAST)
- Postal code (street): 0699
- PO box: 0700
- Area code: 015
- Bird: Northern royal albatross
- Flower: Blue squill
- Website: Official website

Annadale (alternatively known as Ladanna), is a pre-urban human settlement (and sub-area) situated in Polokwane under the Capricorn District Municipality in the Limpopo province of South Africa.
