= Annandale, Dumfries and Galloway =

Valley in Dumfries and Galloway, Scotland

Coordinates: 55.006°N 3.278°W

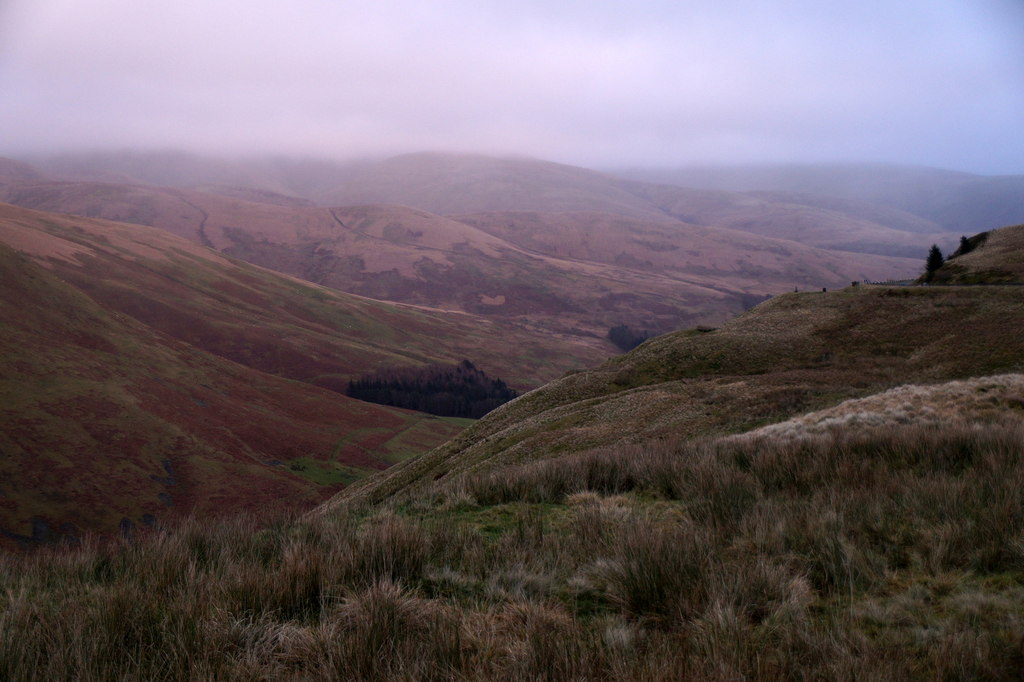
The head of Annandale

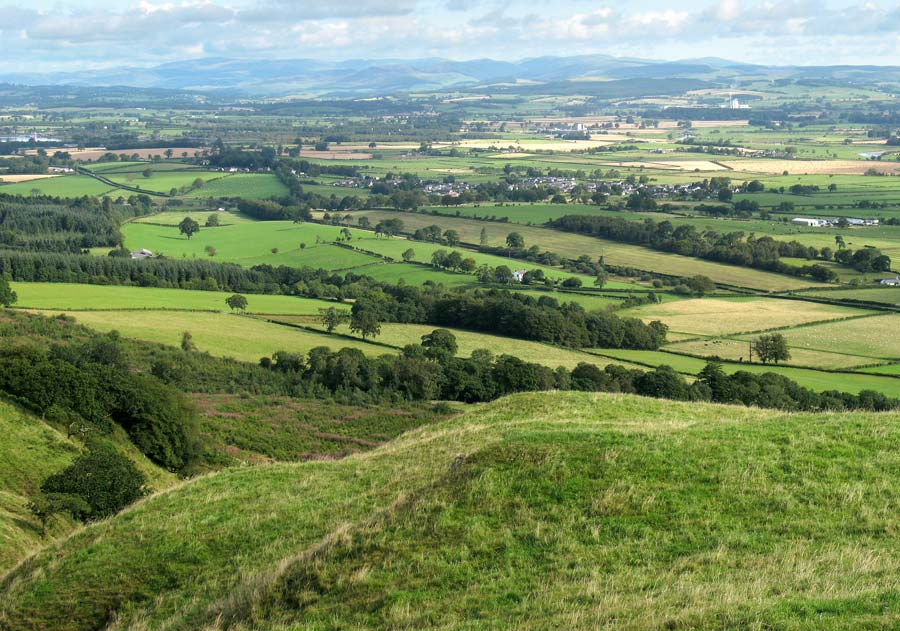
The valley's lower reaches

Annandale is a district of Dumfriesshire, Scotland, centred on the dale or valley of the River Annan. It runs north–south through the Southern Uplands from Annanhead (north of Moffat) to Annan on the Solway Firth. It is bordered by Nithsdale to the west and Eskdale to the east. The Annandale Way runs the length of the valley, a distance of some 53 miles (85 km).

== History ==
Annandale is famous for its connection with Robert the Bruce, as the de Brus family was given this land by David I in 1124 as one of the border lordships when David became Prince of the Cumbrians. Along with Carrick, these lands acted as a buffer between the quasi-independent Lordship or Kingdom of Galloway and David's lands of Strathclyde and Cumbria.

== See also ==
- Annandale distillery
- Annadale, Shimla
- The Lordship of Annandale
