= Annandale =

Annandale may refer to:

== Places ==
=== Australia ===
- Annandale, New South Wales, a suburb of Sydney
- Annandale, Queensland, a suburb of Townsville
- Annandale Station, a cattle station in Queensland

=== Guyana ===
- Annandale, Demerara-Mahaica
- Annandale, Pomeroon-Supenaam

=== Scotland (UK) ===
- Annandale, Dumfries and Galloway, a strath in Dumfries and Galloway, Scotland, UK
  - Annandale distillery, a lowland whisky distillery in Annandale, Scotland

=== United States ===
- Annandale, Pasadena, California
  - Annandale (Pacific Electric), railroad in this location
- Annandale, Minnesota
- Annandale, New Jersey
  - Annandale (NJT station), rail station in this location
- Annandale, Virginia, census-designated place in Fairfax County, Virginia
- Annandale-on-Hudson, New York, US
- Annandale (Gilmore Mills, Virginia), a historic house
- Annandale Plantation, a former plantation in Mannsdale, Mississippi

=== Elsewhere ===
- Annandale, Shimla, a suburb in Shimla, India
- Annandale National Historic Site, Tillsonburg, Ontario, Canada

== People ==
- Robert de Brus, 1st Lord of Annandale (c. 1070–1141)
- Robert de Brus, 2nd Lord of Annandale (died 1194)
- William de Brus, 3rd Lord of Annandale (died 1212)
- Robert de Brus, 4th Lord of Annandale (c. 1195–1245)
- Robert de Brus, 5th Lord of Annandale (c. 1215–1295)
- Robert de Brus, 6th Lord of Annandale (1243 – c. 1304)
- Charles Annandale (1843–1915), British editor
- David Annandale (born 1967), Canadian speculative fiction author
- Nelson Annandale (1876–1924), Scottish zoologist and anthropologist

== Other uses ==
- Annandale (rugby league team), a former team in the New South Wales Rugby League competition

== See also ==
- Annadale (disambiguation)
