= Lowther Hill =

Hill in Scotland

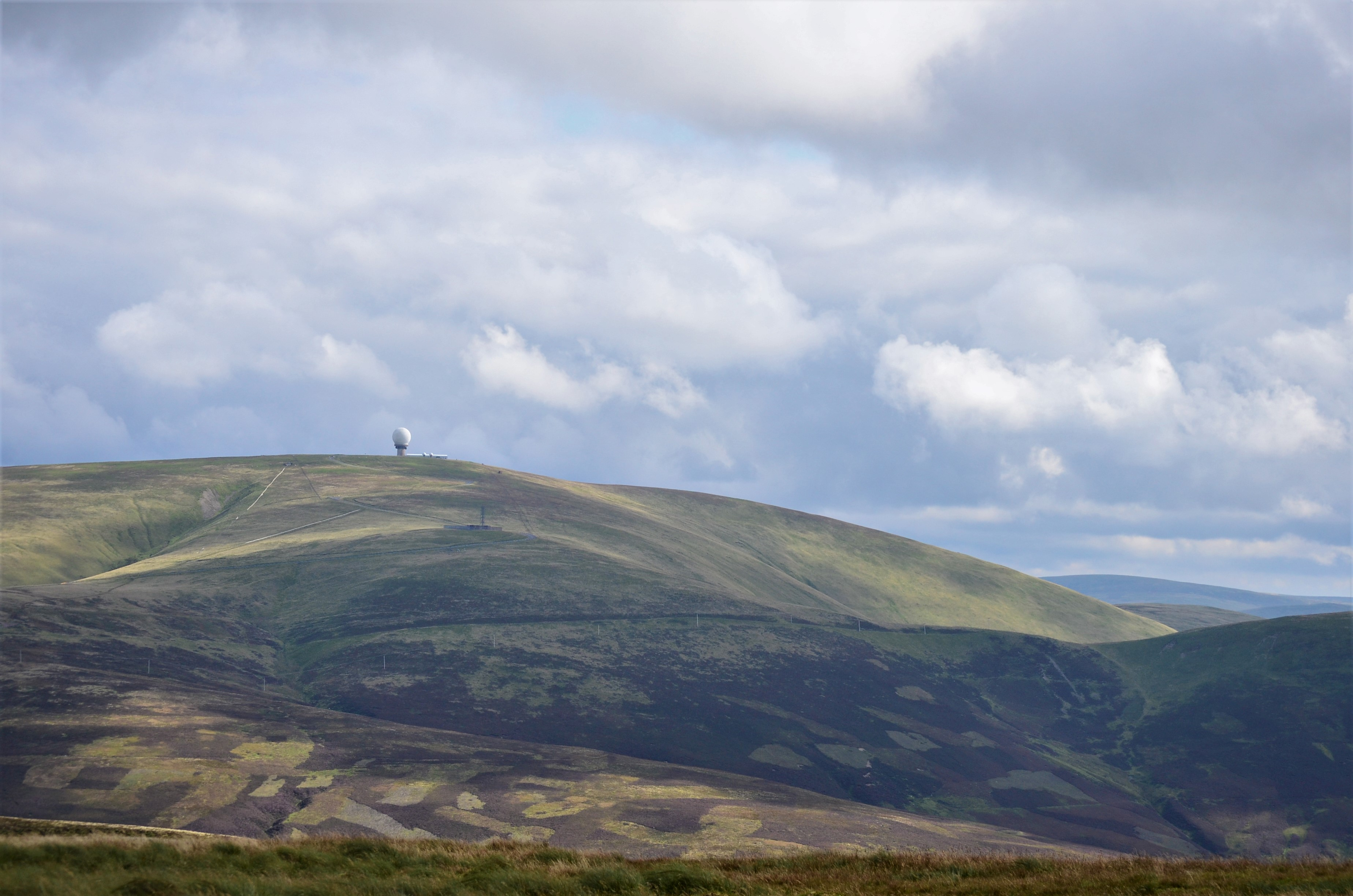

Highest point
- Elevation: 725 m (2,379 ft)
- Prominence: 37 m (121 ft)
- Listing: Tu,Sim,D,GT,DN

Geography
- Location: South Lanarkshire, Dumfries and Galloway, Scotland
- Parent range: Lowther Hills, Southern Uplands
- OS grid: NS 89056 10757
- Topo map: OS Landranger 71, 78

Lowther Hill is a hill in the Lowther Hills range, part of the Southern Uplands of Scotland. Although the hill lends its name to the range, it is the second highest point of the Lowther Hills and lies on the border between Lanarkshire and Dumfries and Galloway, east of the town of Sanquhar, however the true summit lies just within Lanarkshire. The hill can be seen from a great distance in almost every direction throughout the central Southern Uplands when at height, in part due to its summit being topped by a radar station owned by NATS, the radome being colloquially known as "the golf ball". Access to the station is via a private service road starting in Wanlockhead, the highest village in Scotland. Although motor vehicle access is restricted, the road is popular with hillwalkers and cyclists, using it as a means of easy access to the top of the hill or for recreation. Continuing on to the highest of the range, Green Lowther, it is the second highest paved road in Britain and the highest in Scotland. Lowther Hill is also the highest point of the 344 km Southern Upland Way, passing just short of the summit at around 710m.
