= James Annan =

British climate scientist

James Douglas Annan is a scientist involved in climate prediction. He was a member of the Global Warming Research Program at Frontier Research Centre for Global Change which is associated with the Earth Simulator in Japan. In 2014 he left Japan, returning to the United Kingdom as a co-founder of Blue Skies Research.

== Education ==
Annan was awarded a DPhil degree in graph theory by the Mathematical and Physical Sciences Division of the University of Oxford in 1994. His doctoral thesis was entitled The complexity of counting problems.

== Climatology ==
Annan has made several bets against those who believe the scientific consensus on climate change to be incorrect. The November 10, 2004 online version of Reason magazine reported that Lindzen is "willing to take bets that global average temperatures in 20 years will in fact be lower than they are now." Annan contacted Lindzen to arrange a bet and they exchanged proposals for bets, but were unable to agree on terms. The final proposal was a bet that if the temperature change were less than 0.2 °C (0.36 °F), Lindzen would win. If the temperature change were between 0.2 °C and 0.4 °C the bet would be off, and if the temperature change were 0.4 °C or greater, Annan would win. Lindzen would take 20 to 1 odds.

In 2005, another bet for $10,000 was arranged with a pair of Russian solar physicists Galina Mashnich and Vladimir Bashkirtsev. The bet ended in 2017 with a win to Annan. Mashnich and Bashkirtsev did not honour the bet.

A third bet in 2007 between Annan and David Whitehouse of the Global Warming Policy Foundation was arranged by the BBC Radio program, More or Less in 2007. Annan and Whitehouse bet £100 on whether the Met Office temperature would set a new annual record by the end of 2011. Annan was declared to have lost in the program in January 2012.

In 2011, James Annan made a bet with climate economist Chris Hope. Hope had bet Ian Plimer and Sir Alan Rudge £1000 each that 2015 would be hotter than 2008. Hope hedged his bet by betting James Annan that 2015 would be cooler than 2008. Annan offered odds so he would pay Hope £3333 if 2015 were cooler than 2008 and Hope would pay Annan £666 if it were warmer. 2015 was warmer than 2008, so Plimer and Rudge each lost £1000, Hope gained £1334 and Annan gained £666.

He considers that climate sensitivity uncertainty is less than has often been portrayed. Papers on this include "Using multiple observationally-based constraints to estimate climate sensitivity".
