= Survivor Tree (Scotland) =

Tree in Scotland

The Survivor Tree, Scotland
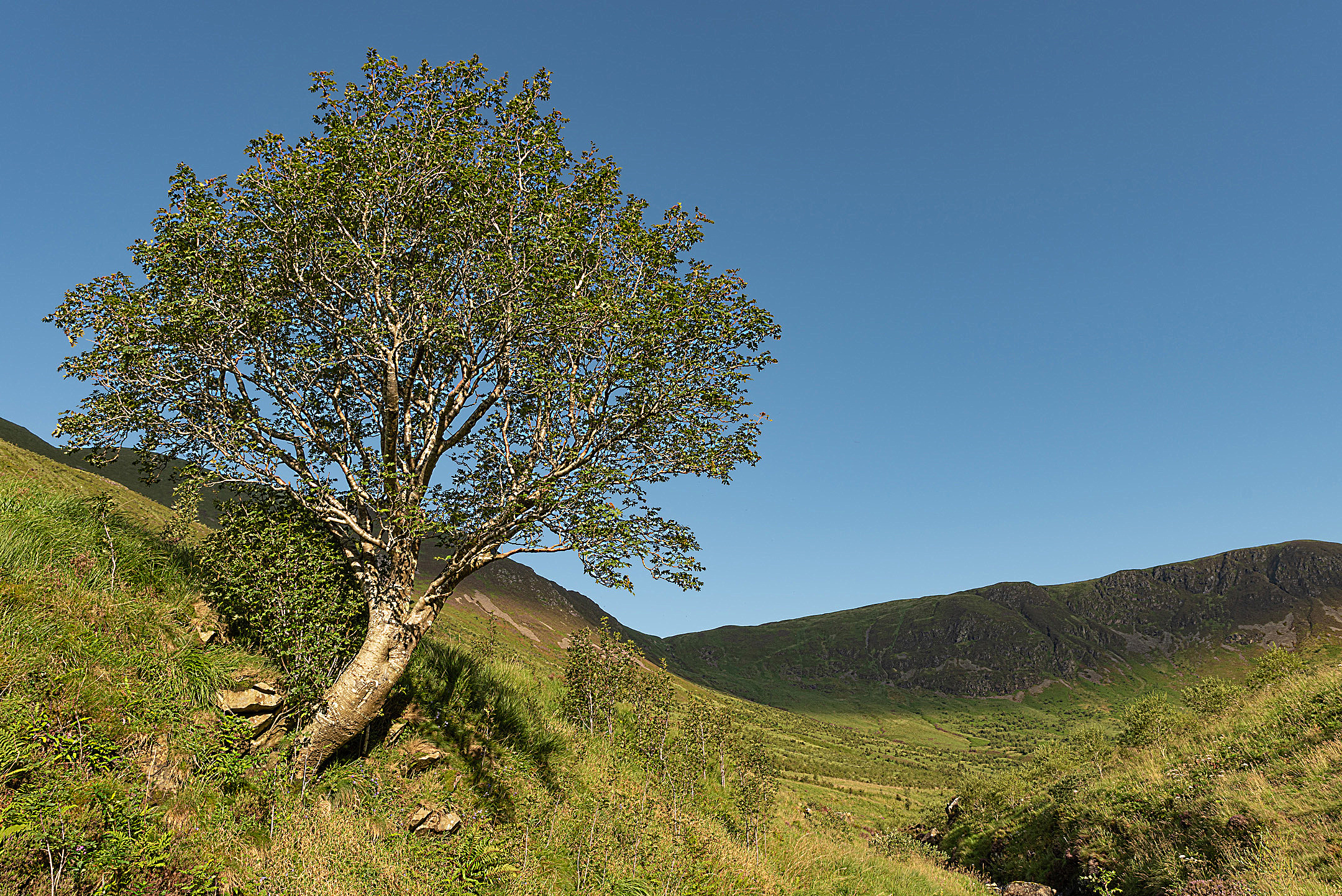
- The Survivor Tree in January 2021
- Interactive map of The Survivor Tree, Scotland
- Species: Rowan (Sorbus aucuparia)
- Location: Scottish Borders
- Coordinates: 55.40179°N 3.33811°W
- Custodian: Borders Forest Trust

The Survivor Tree is a rowan in Carrifran valley in the Moffat Hills in the Southern Uplands of Scotland. It was named Scotland's Tree of the Year in the annual competition held by Woodland Trust Scotland, in 2020.

The rowan is thought to be less than 100 years old, and used to be the only tree in a bare landscape. The Borders Forest Trust took over the land on 1 January 2000, and with support from One Tree Planted, the Carrifran Wildwood area has been reforested. As of 2021, around 700,000 trees have been planted in the area, many by volunteers.

The tree was nominated for the Scottish competition by Fi Martynoga of the Borders Forest Trust, who said that the tree "...rapidly became a very important symbol of our aspirations to see this valley completely rewooded and restored to its natural vegetation." The tree has become a symbol of the Trust's ambition to rewild the valley, and inspired their slogan: "Where one tree survives, a million trees will grow."

After being named Scotland's Tree of the Year in 2020, the tree was the UK's entry into the European Tree of the Year competition, organised by the Environmental Partnership Association, in 2021.

== See also ==
- List of individual trees

== External links section ==
- Borders Forest Trust
