= Hoddom Castle =

Tower house in Dumfries and Galloway, Scotland

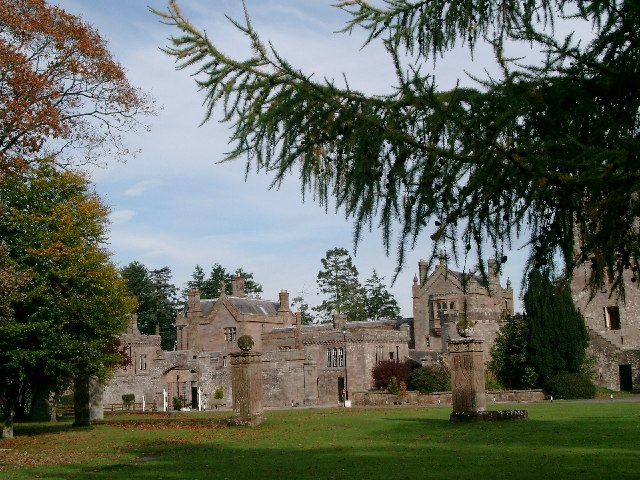
- Hoddom Castle

- Shown within Dumfries and Galloway
- 55°02′38″N 3°19′20″W
- Location: Dumfries and Galloway, Scotland

Listed Building – Category A
- Official name: Hoddom Castle
- Designated: 3 August 1971
- Reference no.: LB3558

Hoddom Castle is a large tower house in Dumfries and Galloway, south Scotland. It is located by the River Annan, 4 kilometres (2.5 mi) south-west of Ecclefechan and the same distance north-west of Brydekirk in the parish of Cummertrees. The castle is protected as a category A listed building.

== History ==
The lands of Hoddom or Hoddam belonged to the Herries family, allies of the Bruce family who were Lords of Annandale from 1124. It passed to the Carruthers family, and then to the Maxwells. At the core of the castle is an L-plan tower house, built in the 16th century. It was probably built for Sir John Maxwell, who acquired Hoddom in the mid 16th-century when he married the heiress Agnes, Lady Herries.

In the aftermath of the reign of Mary, Queen of Scots, the Regent Moray besieged Hoddom, which capitulated after ten hours, on 21 June 1568. It was briefly the base of James Douglas of Drumlanrig, a Warden of the Scottish West March, but was recaptured in 1569 by supporters of Queen Mary. The following year it was attacked by the English under Lord Scrope, who blew up the tower.

This tower was repaired and expanded in the 17th century to form a courtyard castle. It was acquired by Sir Richard Murray from the 6th Lord Herries, and then became the property of the Earl of Southesk in 1653. In 1690 it passed to the Sharpe family. In around 1826, General Matthew Sharpe of Hoddom commissioned William Burn to design modern extensions to the south and west of the castle. Hoddom was purchased in 1877 by the Brook family of Meltham, Huddersfield, who later bought nearby Kinmount House. Further extensions were built in a neo-Jacobean style to the north and west, some at least to designs by architects Wardrop and Anderson.

The house was requisitioned by the military during the Second World War, and was not reoccupied afterwards. In the 1970s William Burn's extensions were largely demolished. The castle now stands in the grounds of a caravan park, and the remaining 19th-century additions are used as offices. The tower house is derelict, and has been included on the Buildings at Risk Register for Scotland. It is also included on Historic Scotland's Castle Conservation Register, which aims to identify buildings which could be successfully restored. In March 2009 planning permission was granted for a redevelopment of the castle, together with the building of a hotel, chalets and a golf course.

== Repentance Tower ==
The duties of the keeper of Hoddom Castle included maintaining the "watch-house" and beacon on Trailtrow Hill. The Repentance Tower at Trailtrow is a very rare example of a mid-16th century watch tower. Possibly built around 1565 by John Maxwell, Lord Herries, the tower takes its name from an inscription 'Repentance' carved on the stonework above the entrance door. It was converted to a dovecote having fallen out of use with the Union of the Crowns under James VI of Scotland, James I of England.
