= Repentance Tower =

C16 watchtower in Dumfries and Galloway, Scotland

- Near Annan, Dumfries and Galloway, Scotland; UK grid reference NY155723
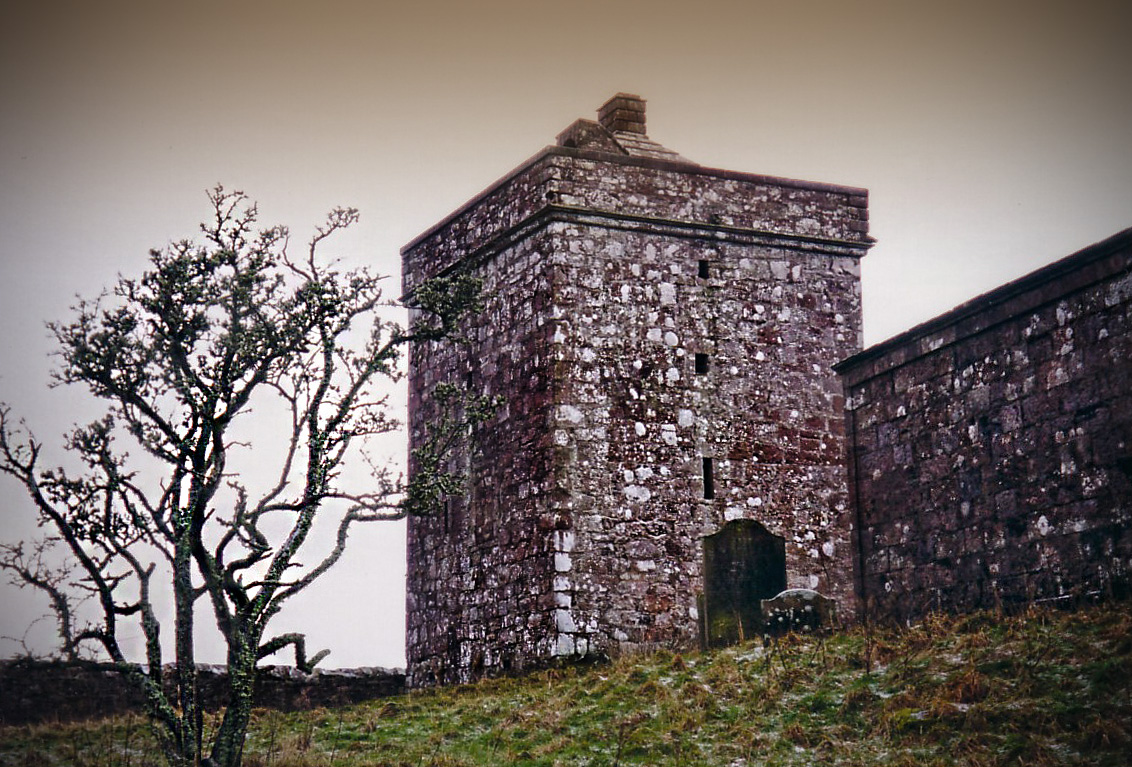
- Repentance Tower

Site information
- Type: Watch Tower
- Owner: Private
- Controlled by: Maxwell Clan
- Open to the public: No
- Condition: Preserved

Location
- Shown within Scotland
- Location within Scotland
- Coordinates: 55.037563°N 3.322951°W
- Height: 30 feet to parapet walk

Site history
- Built: 1565
- Built by: John Maxwell
- In use: Until the union of the crowns
- Materials: Sandstone

The Repentance Tower is a very rare example of a mid-16th century watch tower standing on Trailtrow Hill, six miles north-west of Annan, Dumfries and Galloway. Built in 1565 by John Maxwell, the tower takes its name from an inscription Repentance carved on the stonework above the entrance door.

== History ==
The watch tower remained with the Maxwells until in around 1627 the sixth Lord Herries sold Hoddam Castle and the tower to Sir Richard Murray of Cockpool (Comlongan) Castle. The barony and castle were purchased in 1690 by John Sharpe and remained with that family until 1878.

Walter Scott made a note of traditions connected with the tower in Minstrelsy of the Scottish Border.

Thomas Carlyle lived at the nearby farm with his family from May 1825 to May 1826. He knew the tower and the views from Trailtrow Hill very well, leaving vivid descriptions in his letters and Reminiscences.

=== Construction ===
The tower was built by John Maxwell, 4th Lord Herries, who had built Hoddom Castle on lower ground nearby. It is said that he unwisely used stone from the Trailtrow Chapel that once stood on this site in the construction of his castle, with the result that Alexander Gordon, Archbishop of Glasgow required that a watch tower be built as recompense. It is surrounded by gravestones associated with the former chapel.

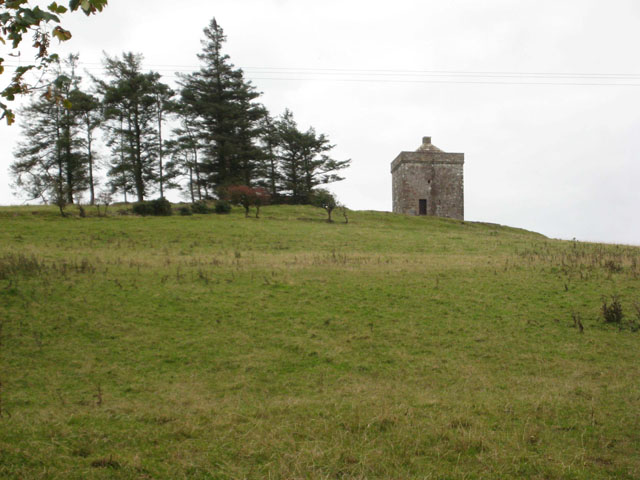
The Repentance Tower on Trailtrow Hill.

Its dimensions are similar to that of the average fortalice or tower and it is nearly square in section. Three storeys high it is surmounted by a later chimney-like stone beacon for a watch-fire where the bell would originally have been. A parapet and walk are at the top and the Hip roof was covered with stone slabs without any gables. Gun loops, shot holes and small windows are present with the entrance at the first floor level, now provided with a set of stone steps although originally a retractable wooden ladder would have been used. Several cannon-like water spouts are present for drainage.

A bird and a scroll flank the word 'REPENTANCE' carved in Gothic script above the double entrance door. The stone does not extend the width of the door suggesting that it has been re-used from the old chapel. The basement and top storeys are vaulted and a wooden ladder originally gave access to the other floors, the basement being entered from the first floor. A small fireplace existed on the upper storey. Some repairs and alterations have been made over the years, especially to the parapet in the 18th century.

The tower was besieged and damaged by the English in 1570 and repaired by 1579. In 1579 Lord Herries wrote to James VI saying "..the wache toure upoun Trailtrow callit Repentance mon be mendit of the litill diffacing the Englische army maid of it."

Trailtrow Hill is conical and is some 350 feet high giving views of the Solway and the hills of Cumberland.

The tower and chapel on Trailtrow Hill were accessed via a lane that ran from near Hoddom Mains and continued through to Trailtrow Farm.

=== Purpose ===
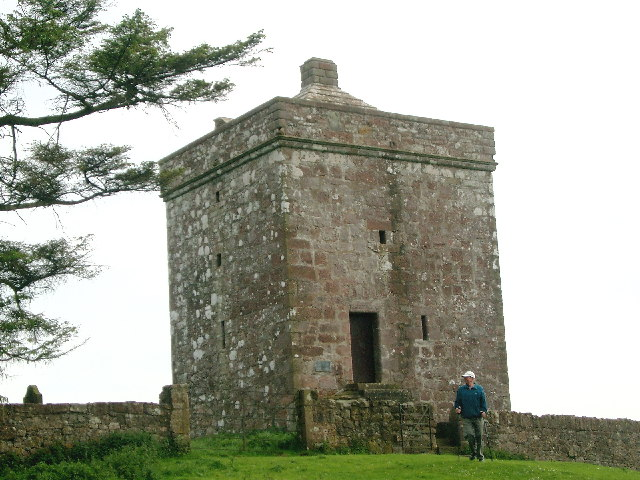
The watch tower and entrance door.

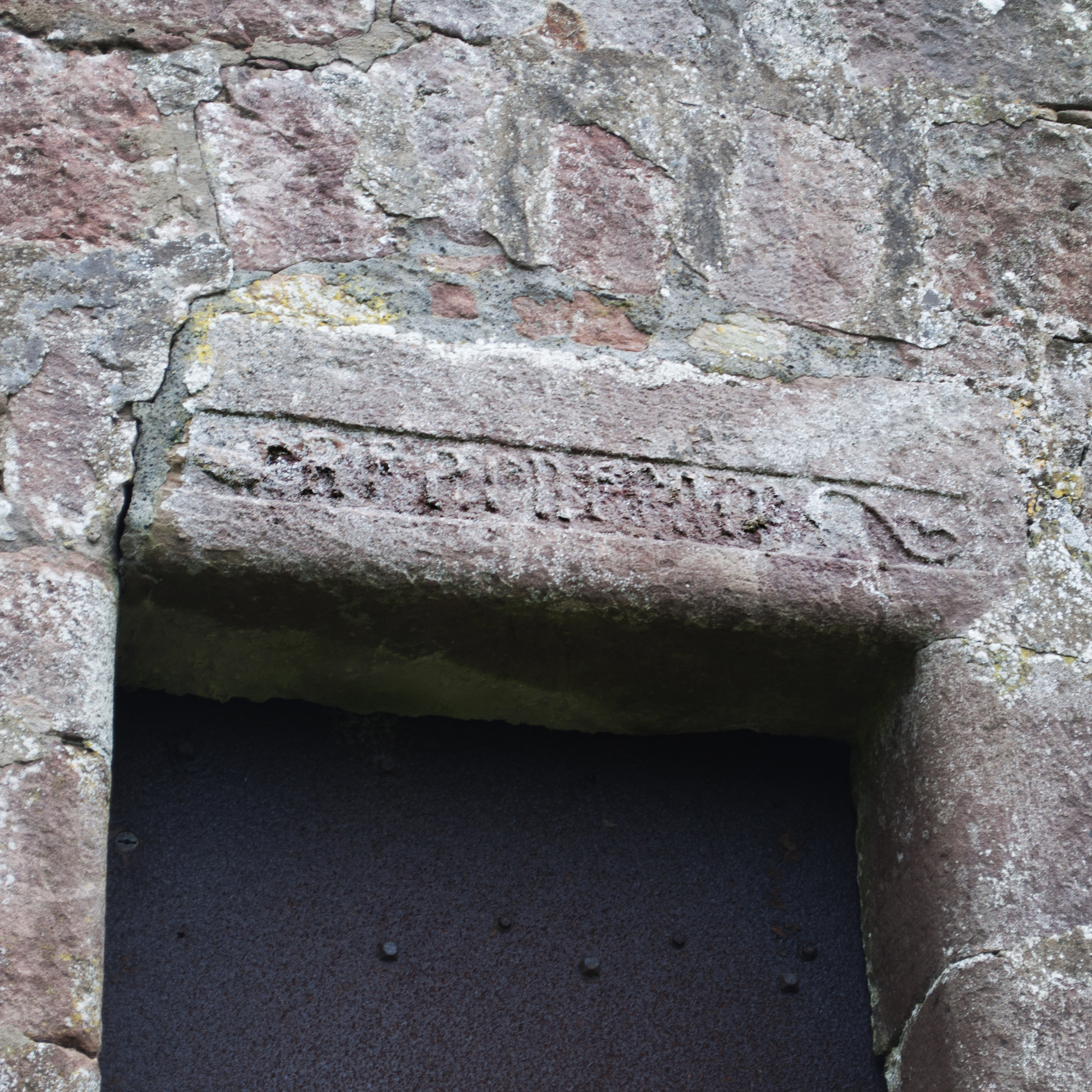
Repentance inscription

The tower had only one small fireplace and was not designed as a habitation, its purpose being to provide an elevated place of safety from which sentinels or guards could keep watch on the surrounding land, the West March of the Border, and the Solway Firth for English invaders or raiding parties. A bell and a beacon fire acted as signals to the Scots of invasion.

Bishop Pococke wrote that "..It was built by a Maxwel who had committed great ravages against Queen Mary, but afterwards became a papist and built this for a beacon, and put up in Saxon characters over the door - Repentance."

The beacon in the fire pan was always kept burning as a signal so long as the English troops remained in Scotland. The bell was to be rung when the English were spotted coming over the River Annan, etc. The bell and beacon also warned the Scots to take cover or else be seen as traitors. The beacon was located on the ground beside the tower and the bell was hung on the summit of the roof according to one source. A beacon at Trailtrow was first described in a regulation for border defence made by William Douglas, 8th Earl of Douglas in 1448 at a meeting at Lincluden Abbey, "for cuming of ane Inglis oist in Scotland, ther sal ane baill be brynt on Trailtrow hill".

In the 18th century, the upper storey of the watch tower was converted into a doocot or dovecote.

During the Second World War, the Repentance Tower was put back in use. A platoon of the Annan Home Guard occupied the tower with instructions to keep watch on the Solway for enemy invasion forces. In the event of sighting, they had standing orders to light the signal beacon on the roof and keep it burning. Two of the team were detailed to cycle to Hoddom Castle to raise the alarm with the regulars stationed there while another two cycled to raise the alarm at the Chapelcross airfield. The cyclists were then detailed to return to the Repentance Tower and hold the road past the tower to Hoddom bridge until help arrived. They were well-armed with six Enfield rifles between them and an assortment of home-made carbide and molotov devices. It was generally assumed that the regulars from Hoddom would have been drawn back to somewhere more defensible.

=== Origins of the name ===
Several suggestions regarding the origin of the name 'Repentance Tower' have been made in addition to the recompense for robbing the stone from Trailtrow Chapel. Bishop Pococke wrote that "It was built by a Maxwell who had committed great ravages against Queen Mary, but afterwards became a papist and built this for a beacon, and put up in Saxon characters over the door - Repentance," which suggests a religious reason. Dumfriesshire had at one point been invaded and held for a time by the English and John Maxwell had pledged not to fight on pain of the death of 14 Scots who were held at Carlisle Castle. He subsequently broke his pledge and the hostages were executed. It is suggested that he built the tower as an act of repentance and as a monument to those who had perished.

Given the fact that the stone bearing the script is shorter than the width of the entrance it may have been re-used from the demolished chapel.

== Bibliography & further reading ==
- Carroll, David (2015). Dumfries and Galloway Curiosities. Stroud:The History Press. ISBN 978-0-7524-6406-0
- Coventry, Martin (2001). The Castles of Scotland. 3rd Ed. Musselburgh:Goblinshead. ISBN 1-899874-26-7
- Coventry, Martin (2008). The Castles of the Clans. 2nd Ed. Musselburgh:Goblinshead. ISBN 978-1-899874-36-1
- Maxwell-Irving, A. M. T. (2000). The Border Towers of Scotland. Creedon Publications. ISBN 1-899316-31-0
- MacGibbon, David and Ross, Thomas (1990 Reprint). The Castellated and Domestic Architecture of Scotland. Volume II. Edinburgh:James Thin.ISBN 0-901824-18-6
- Salter, Mike (2006). The Castles of South-West Scotland. Malvern:Folly Publications. ISBN 1-871731-70-4
- Stell, Geoffrey (1986). Exploring Scotland's Heritage. Dumfries and Galloway. Edinburgh:RCAHMS. ISBN 0-11-492459-7
- Tranter, Nigel (1977). The Fortified House in Scotland. V.3. South-West Scotland. Edinburgh:The Mercat Press.
