= Devil's Beef Tub =

Hollow in Scottish hills

Coordinates: 55.40016°N 3.48111°W

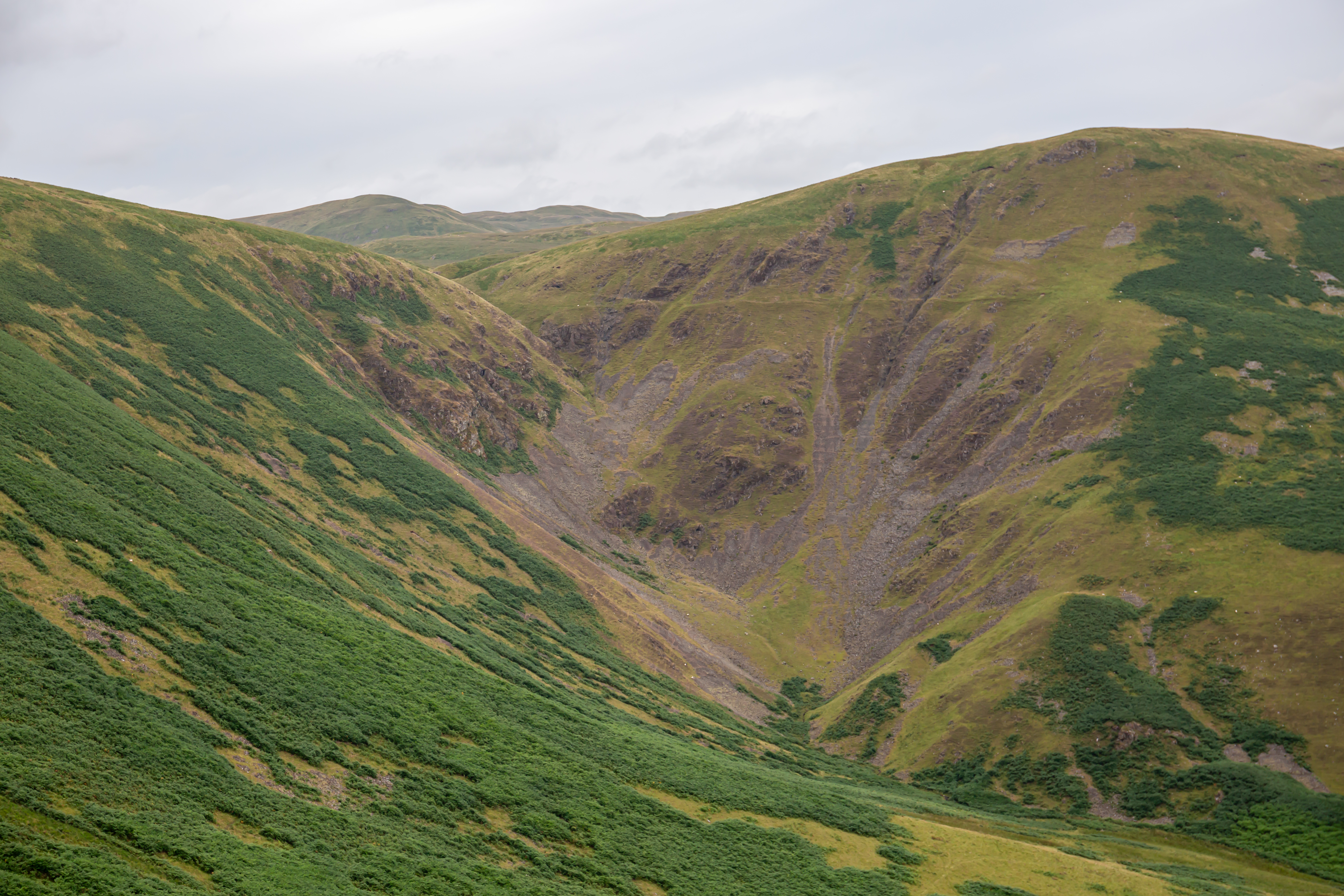
The Devil's Beef Tub

The Devil's Beef Tub (also called Marquis of Annandale's Beef-Tub, Beef-Stand, or MacLaren's Leap) is a deep, dramatic hollow in the hills north of the Scottish town of Moffat. The 150-metre-deep (490-foot) hollow is formed by four hills, Great Hill, Peat Knowe, Annanhead Hill and Ericstane Hill. It is one of the two main sources of the River Annan.

== Etymology ==
The unusual name derives from its use to hide stolen cattle by the Border Reivers of the Johnstone clan who were referred to by their enemies as "devils"; it is also called Marquis of Annandale's Beef-Tub (or Beef-Stand) after the Lord of Annandale, chief of the raiding "loons" (here meaning "lads", rather than "lunatics"); the name may also refer to the resemblance the valley bears to a tub used for preserving meat. The Scots Dialect Dictionary, first published 1911 by Chambers and compiled by the lexicographer Alexander Warrack, gives the following; "deil's beef-tub n. a roaring linn". In the eighteenth and nineteenth century the local town of Moffat was famed for its sulphur baths. The sulphurous water emanated out of the ground at the Moffat Well adjacent to the Devil's Beef Tub. This was then transported to the town bath house where its efficacious properties were enjoyed by the public. It would appear that beef-tub is a corruption of bathtub.

== History ==
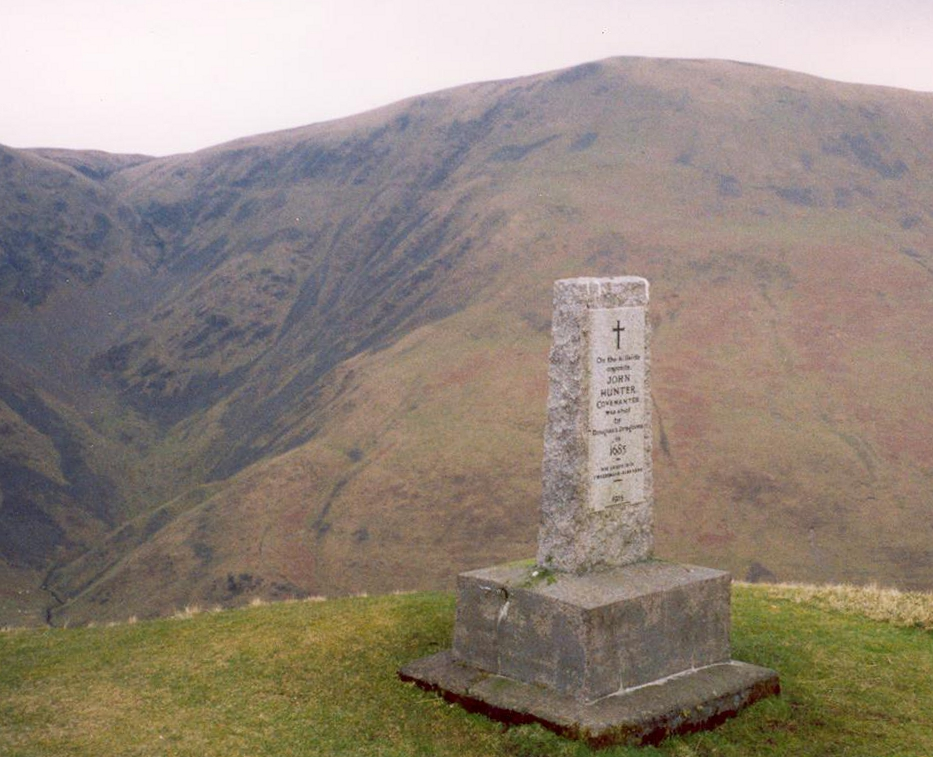
The monument to John Hunter

On 12 August 1685 fleeing covenanter John Hunter attempted to escape pursuing dragoons by running up the steep side of the Beef Tub. He failed, was shot dead on the spot, and is buried in Tweedsmuir kirkyard (churchyard). A monument to Hunter stands on the southwest rim of the Beef Tub.

'Corehead and Devil's Beef Tub' and the 'Talla and Gameshope' areas, were acquired in 2009 and 2013 by the Borders Forest Trust that was formed by the group that created the Carrifran Wildwood rewilding project. Together, these three areas of rewilding in the Moffat Hills are known as 'The Wild Heart of Southern Scotland'.

== Literature ==
In his novel Redgauntlet, novelist Walter Scott said, "It looks as if four hills were laying their heads together, to shut out daylight from the dark hollow space between them. A damned deep, black, blackguard-looking abyss of a hole it is". Scott also describes the flight of a highlander fleeing the aftermath of the failure of the Jacobite rising of 1745; the soldier rolls down the hill amid a hail of enemy gunfire, and escapes. The Beef Tub is also known as MacCleran's Loup after the tumbling highlander.
