= Annanhead Hill =

Summit in the Moffat Hills of Scotland

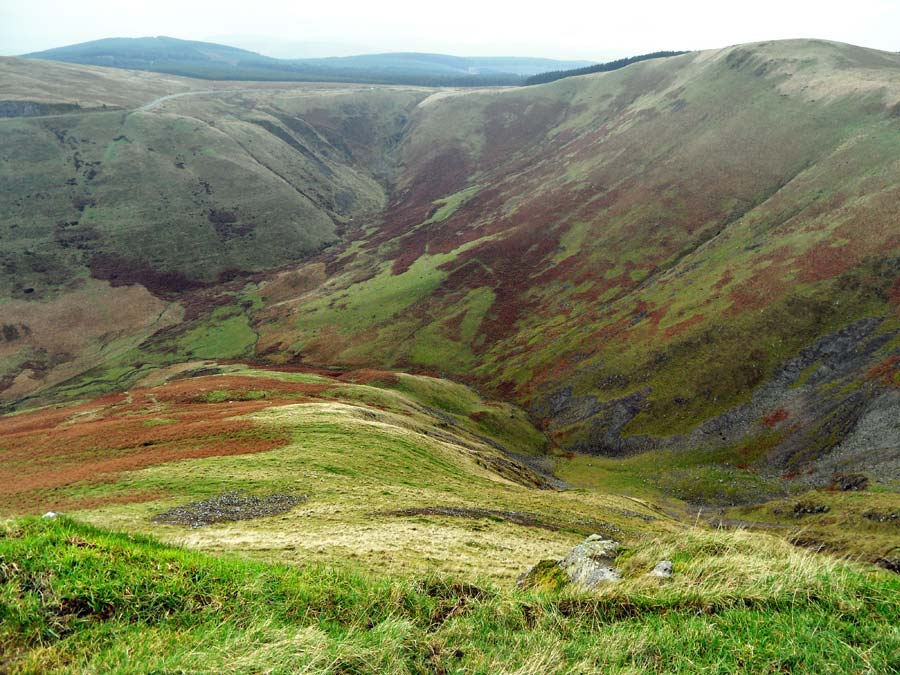
- Annanhead Hill above Devil's Beef Tub

Highest point
- Elevation: 478 m (1,568 ft)
- Coordinates: 55°24′15″N 3°29′19″W

Geography
- Location within Scotland
- Location: 9 km north of Moffat
- Parent range: Moffat Hills
- OS grid: NT 05834 13251

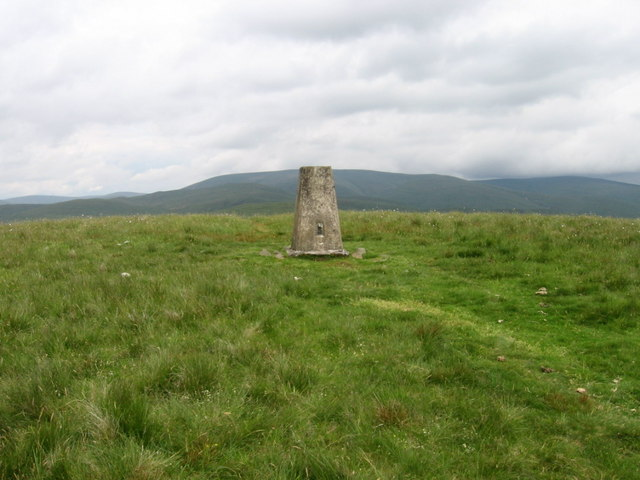
Annanhead Hill trig point (S5678)

Annanhead Hill is a 478-metre (1,568 ft) summit in the Moffat Hills of Scotland. It lies on the boundary between the Scottish Borders and Dumfries and Galloway, 9 kilometres (5.6 mi) north of Moffat, in the Southern Uplands.

Annanhead is one of four hills encircling the Devil's Beef Tub, the headwaters of River Annan.

The hill is crossed by the Annandale Way hiking trail designated in 2009.
