= Templand =

Coordinates: 55°9′45″N 3°26′18″W

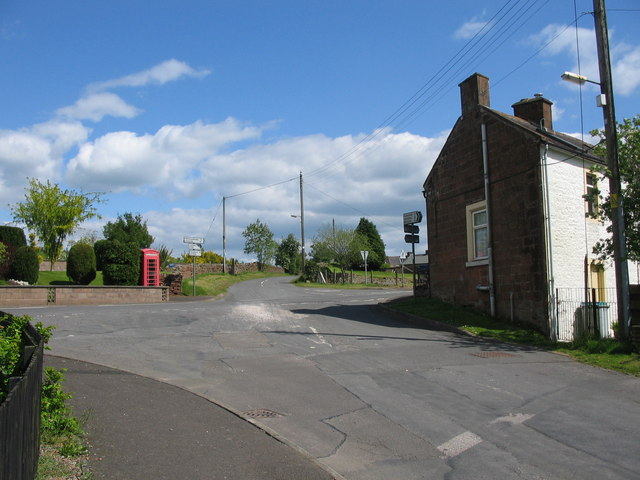
- Crossroads at Templand

- Location within Dumfries and Galloway
- OS grid reference: NY083861
- Council area: Dumfries and Galloway
- Lieutenancy area: Dumfriesshire
- Country: Scotland
- Sovereign state: United Kingdom
- Post town: LOCKERBIE
- Postcode district: DG11
- Police: Scotland
- Fire: Scottish
- Ambulance: Scottish
- UK Parliament: Dumfriesshire, Clydesdale and Tweeddale
- Scottish Parliament: Dumfriesshire

Templand is a village in Dumfriesshire, Scotland, located around 4.5 miles (7.2 km) northwest of Lockerbie.

Templand was built during the Industrial Revolution, with the nearby Corncockle Quarry used for quarrying red sandstone to central Scotland and beyond. Stone from the quarry was used in the construction of the Kelvingrove Art Gallery and Museum in Glasgow and was quarried for the refurbishment of the gallery completed in 2006. At its height of activity up to the 1930s it had its own mineral line from what is now the West Coast Mainline and up to 6 trains per week of stone were moved to Glasgow, throughout Scotland.

Templand lies between the Corncockle woodland, a marsh, and the Kinnel Water. Geographically it is believed that the entire Templand area is on a massive slab of sandstone, due to the Annan river carrying sand down from the Moffat area.
