= River Annan =

River in south-west Scotland

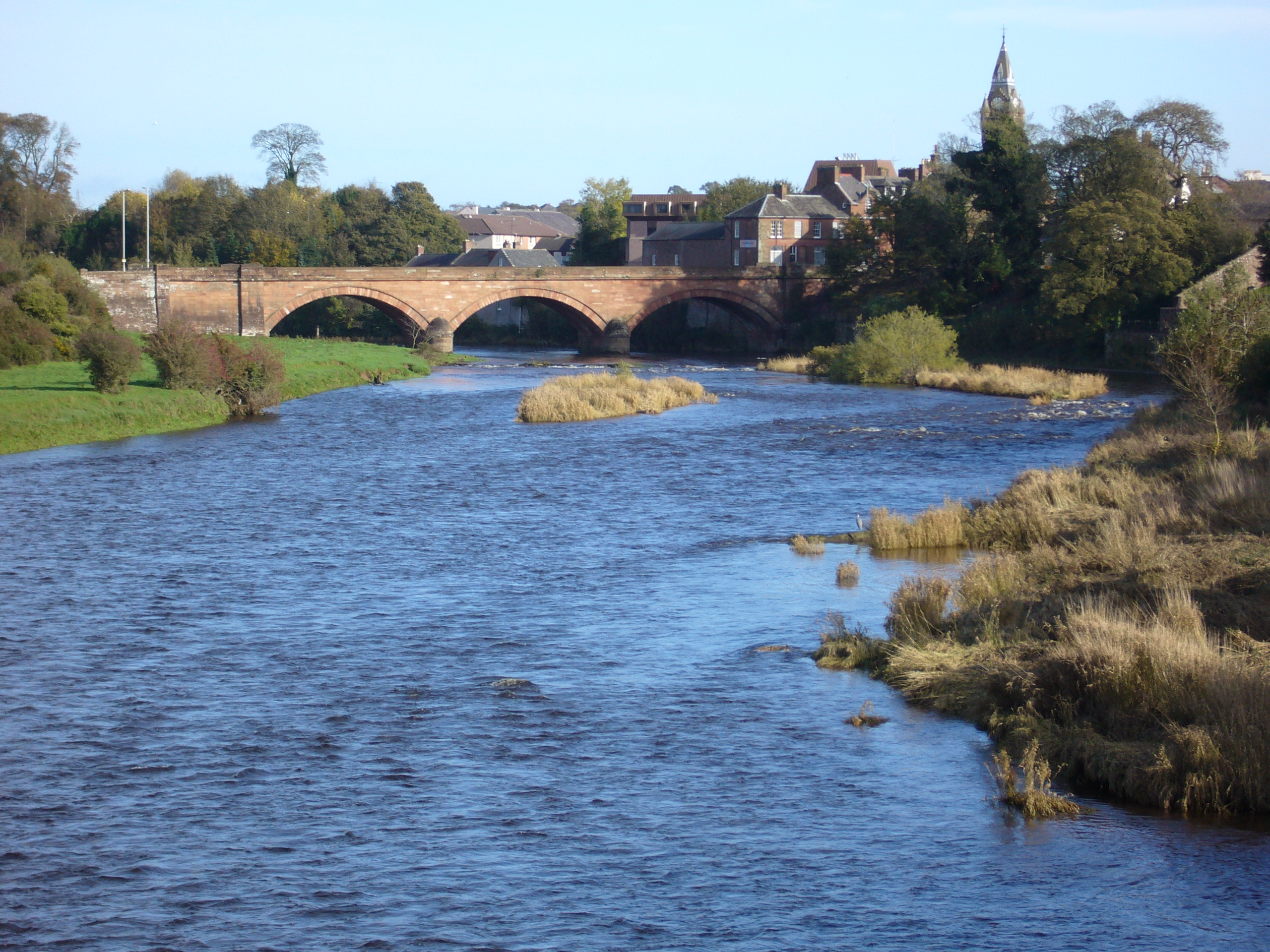
- River Annan road bridge in Annan
- Native name: Anainn (Scottish Gaelic)

Location
- Country: Scotland
- Counties: Annandale, Dumfries and Galloway
- City: Moffat, Lockerbie

Physical characteristics
- Source: Hart Fell, Moffat. Annanhead Hill, Devil's Beef Tub
  - coordinates: 55.399°N 3.473°W
- Mouth: Annan
  - coordinates: 54°58′0″N 3°16′0″W
- Length: 64 km (40 mi)
- Basin size: 950 km^{2} (370 sq mi)

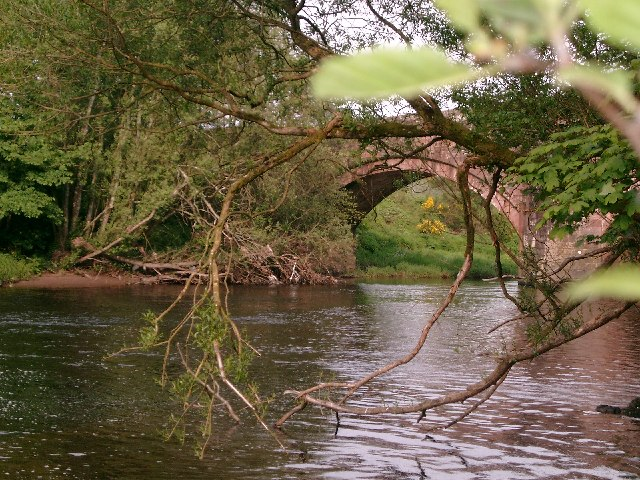
Hoddom Bridge

The River Annan (Scottish Gaelic: Anainn) is a river in south-west Scotland. It rises on Annanhead Hill and flows through the Devil's Beef Tub, Moffat and Lockerbie, reaching the sea at Annan, Dumfries and Galloway after about 40 miles.

== Name ==
The etymology of the River Annan is unknown, although some sources suggest it may mean simply "water", from a Celtic language. It gave its name to Annandale, a former stewartry comprising a large portion of modern Dumfriesshire, and to the port town of Annan near its mouth.

== Description ==
The Annan rises on Annanhead Hill, five miles north of Moffat, near the source of the Tweed (1.9 kilometres or 1 1/4 miles away), and also close to the source of the Clyde (10.4 km or 6 1/2 mi away). It then flows through the Devil's Beef Tub, where it is joined by a secondary source that rises on Hartfell. It then flows past the town of Moffat and Lockerbie. Two miles out of Moffat, it is joined by the Moffat Water flowing westward from Loch Skene and the Evan Water flowing eastward from the upper part of Lanarkshire. Below this, it is joined by the Kinnel Water from the west and the Dryfe Water from the east. It reaches the sea 2 mi (3 km) past the port of Annan. Newbie Harbour on the River Annan once served the Barony of Newbie and lay where the Old Mill Burn has its confluence with the river.

== Popular culture ==
The Annan makes several appearances in folk songs from the Borders, and in most appears as a malevolent force, drowning those who try to cross it. One of the most well recorded is Annan Waters (Child 215). Versions of this song have been recorded by artists including Nic Jones and Kate Rusby.

In online comic Gunnerkrigg Court, the Annan Waters are a river separating the Court from the Gillitie Forest, and mark the separation between technology/science and magic/nature.

The Decemberists recorded a song entitled "Annan Water" on their 2009 folk opera concept album The Hazards of Love.

== See also ==
- Annan (surname)
- Annandale, Dumfries and Galloway
