= Powfoot Halt railway station =

Former railway station in Dumfries and Galloway, Scotland

Coordinates: 54.9851°N 03.3081°W

Powfoot
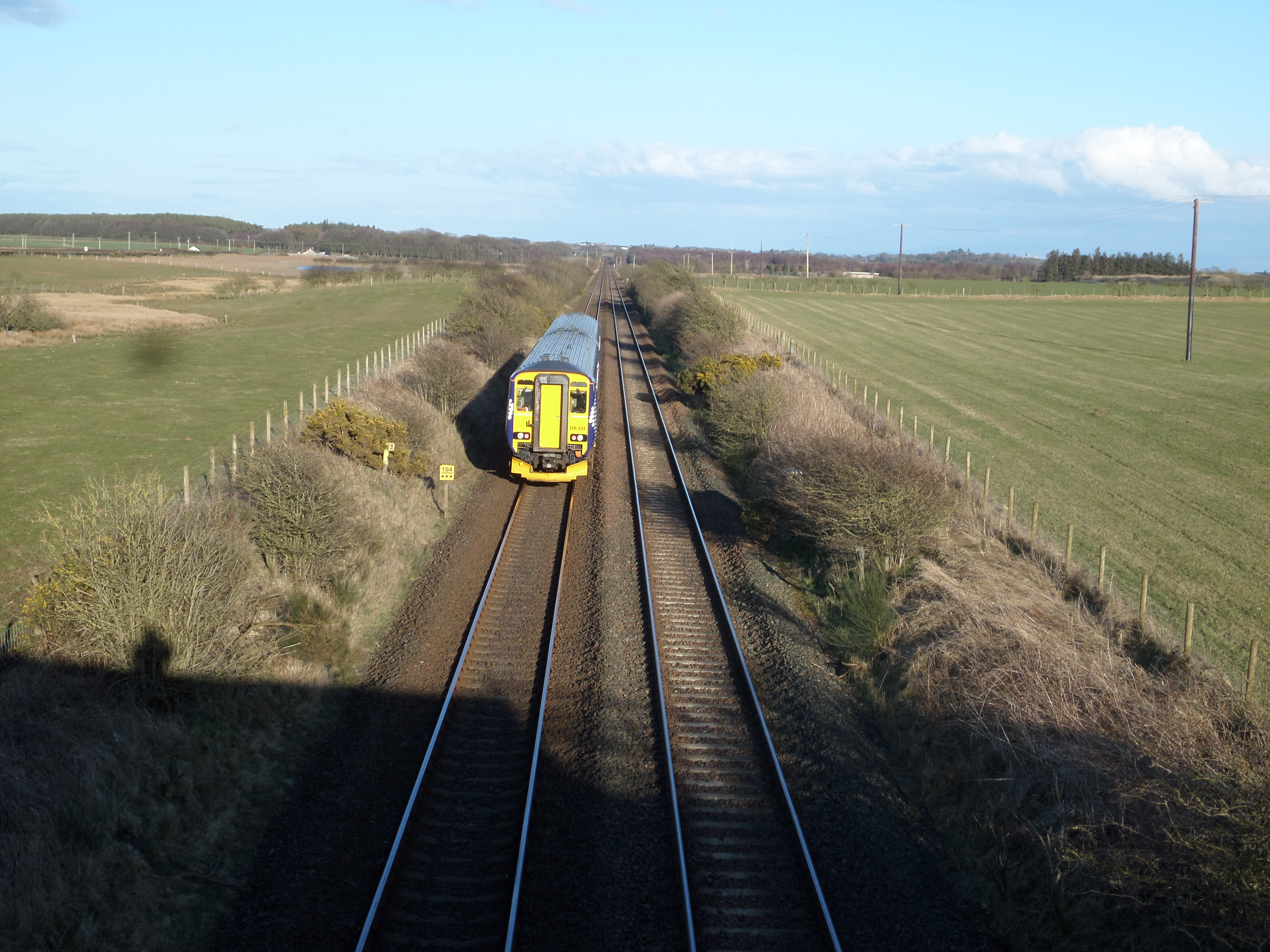
- Site of Powfoot Halt

General information
- Location: Powfoot, Dumfries and Galloway; Scotland
- Grid reference: NY163663
- Platforms: 2

Other information
- Status: Disused

History
- Original company: LMS

Key dates
- May 1941: Opened
- Before 1966: Closed
Location

Powfoot Halt railway station was a railway station in Powfoot, near Dumfries and Galloway, Scotland, south of Cummertrees serving the workers at the MOD Powfoot Nitro-cellulose factory within the Parish of Cummertrees.

== History ==
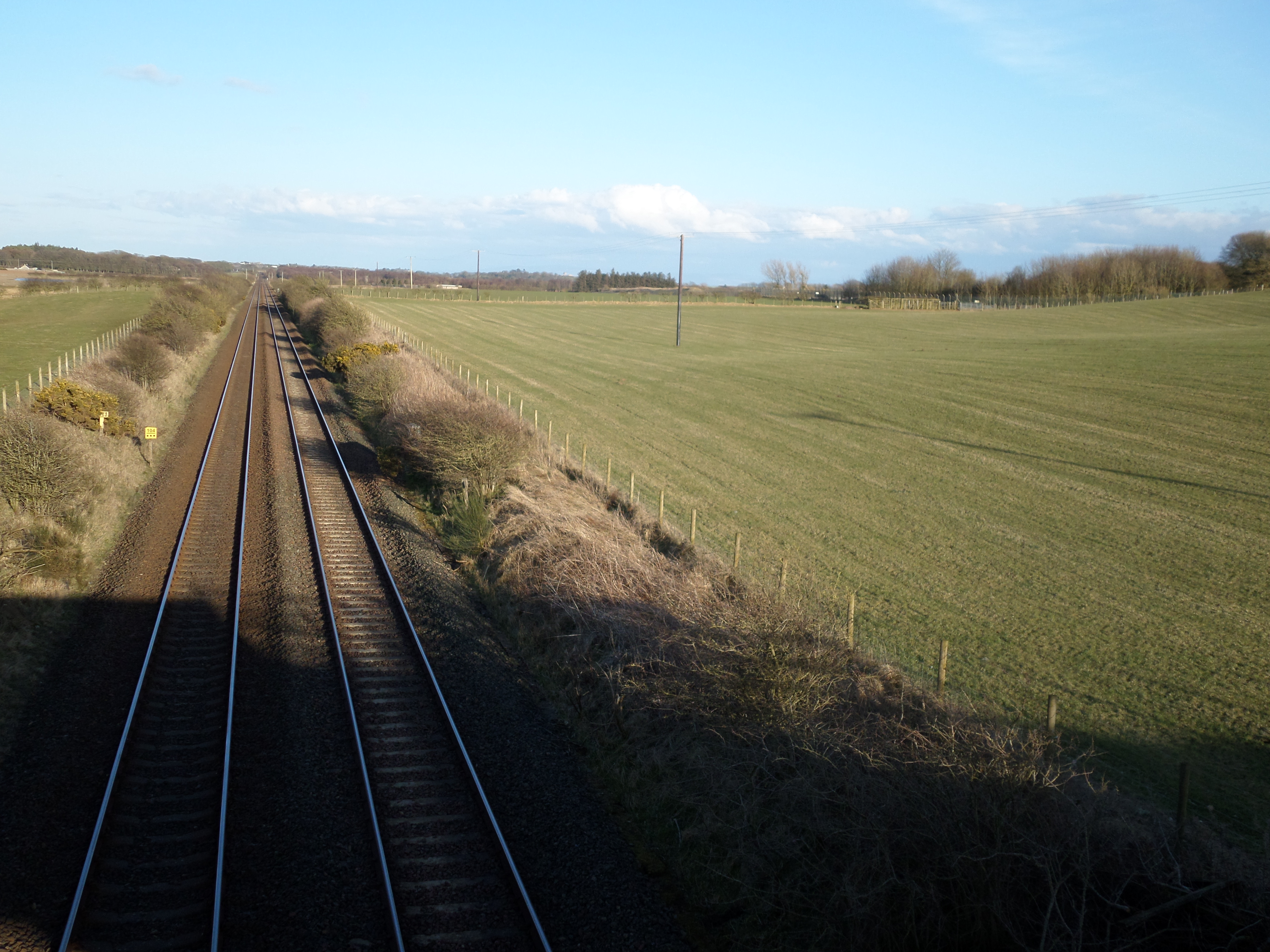
The view towards the site of Powfoot Halt.

The Powfoot Nitro-cellulose factory was established by the War Office in 1940 and was supplied with materials by train from Bishopton. The factory was re-opened during the Korean and the Falklands wars. The site was run by Nobel's Explosives on behalf of the Ministry of Defence and Royal Ordnance. The processing facility closed in 1992. The halt was not open to the general public and only served workers at the munitions factory.

The halt is recorded on the OS map published in 1954 on the line next to the Broom Cottage to Broom lane.

Newbie Junction Halt railway station was another workers only halt that existed between 1898 and 1904 close to Annan where it served the factory workers of Cochran's & Co. boilers and the Newbie Brick and Tile works.

== Infrastructure ==
The relatively short platforms were built on the double track line from wood and were reached by a set of wooden steps leading up from the Longfords to Broom lane. In 1966 the halt was still present.

== The site today ==
A line ran into the factory that has now been removed and nothing remains of the halt. The old factory site is partly camouflaged by tree plantations.

Preceding station	Historical railways	Following station
Cummertrees; Line open; station closed	Glasgow and South Western Railway; Glasgow, Dumfries and Carlisle Railway	Annan; Line open; station open

== Sources ==
- Butt, R. V. J. (October 1995). The Directory of Railway Stations: details every public and private passenger station, halt, platform and stopping place, past and present (1st ed.). Sparkford: Patrick Stephens Ltd. ISBN 978-1-85260-508-7. OCLC 60251199. OL 11956311M.
