= Newbie Branch =

Freight or mineral railway branch in Dumfries and Galloway, Scotland

Coordinates: 54.9811°N 3.2779°W

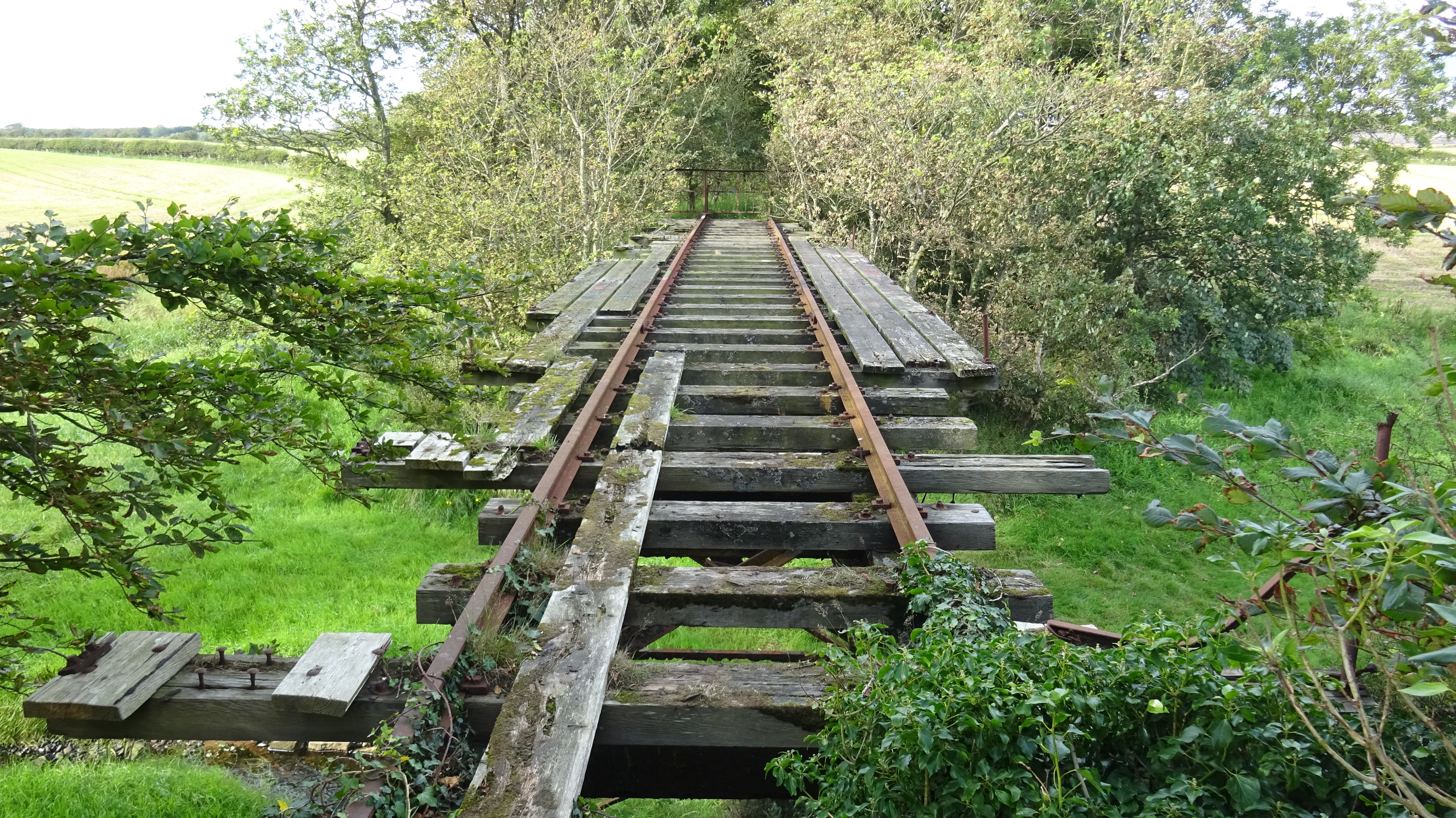
- View towards the site of Newbie Junction

Overview
- Locale: Annan, Dumfries and Galloway
- Dates of operation: Circa 1898–Circa 1975
- Predecessor: Newbie Brick and Tile Works
- Successor: Abandoned

Technical
- Track gauge: Standard
- Length: 0.5 miles (0.80 km)

The Newbie Branch, Newbie Siding or Cochran & Cos Siding was a freight or mineral branch in Dumfries and Galloway, Scotland, located just west of Annan off the old Glasgow and South Western Railway main line. The 0.5 mile or circa 800 metres line once served the Cochran & Co. Boiler factory and the Newbie Brick and Tile Works at Newbie. The line was accessed at Newbie Junction and was approached from the west.

== History ==
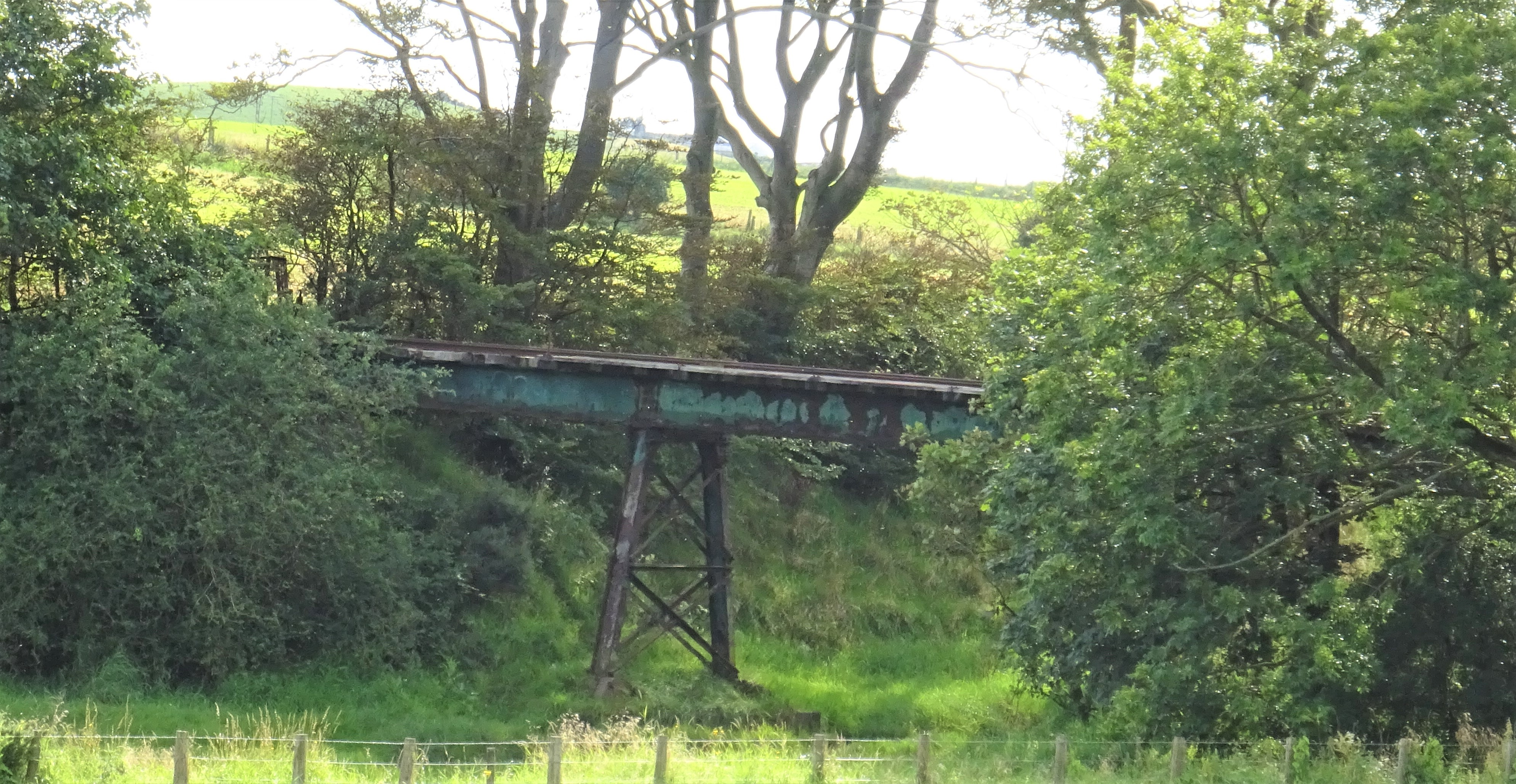
Old Mill Bridge pier support

The line was not used for passenger traffic and had originally been built to serve the Newbie Brick and Tile Works, but that business had closed when the clay quarry was exhausted and the track lifted by 1929. The line was extended to serve the Cochran & Co. works beside the River Annan. The 1898 OS map was the first to show the line.

The short lived Newbie Junction Halt opened for the factory workers only around 1898 and was closed around 1904. Trains only called in the mornings and evenings.

== Operation ==
In 1898 the key for Newbie Junction was kept in an Annan railway station signal box and the Newbie Junction box was opened as required by a porter travelling by train from Annan.

In 1898 no trains were permitted to call at Newbie Branch Junction during foggy weather or between sunset and sunrise unless the Main Line and Branch Signals were lit.

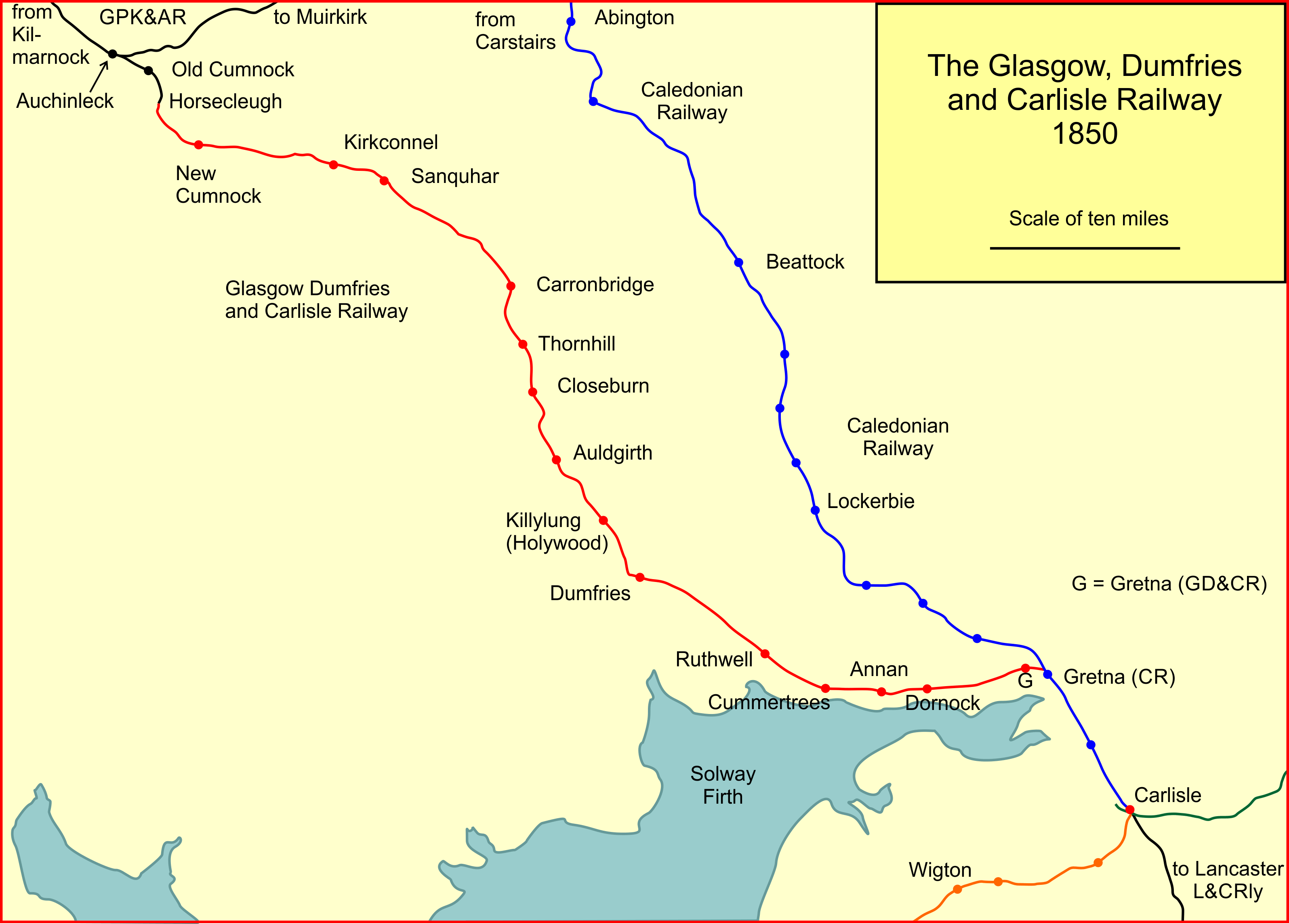
System map of the public passenger stations on the line

if a train had to call at Newbie Junction the following procedures were to be followed with "Is Line Clear?" signalled "as applicable to a train calling at an intermediate siding in a Block Section must be sent to Cummertrees. The signalman in Annan Cabin must not allow a Down Train to follow until the "Line Clear" or "Train out of Section" Signal, as the case may be has been received from Cummertrees, indicating that the train which called at Newbie Branch Junction has arrived complete with the tail lamp attached, and has passed forward clear of the section, or been shunted clear of the Down Line."

Cochran's ran trips on the line during open days up until the early 1970s.

== Infrastructure ==
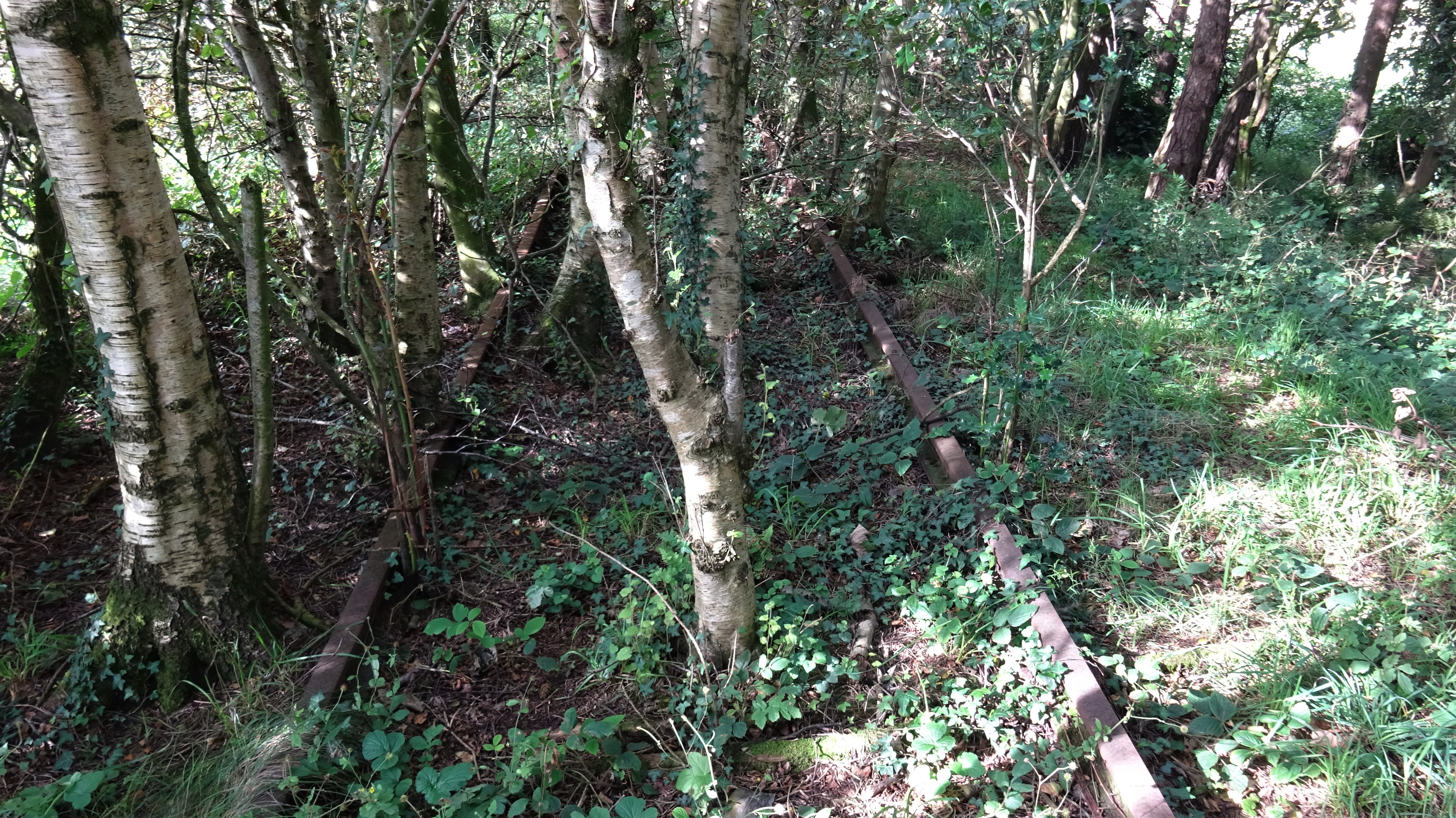
Section of abandoned and overgrown track

As stated this mineral branch was served by trains from the west and the junction was circa 73 miles (117 km) from Kilmarnock railway station. Newbie signal box stood on the south side of the line here, next to the junction to Newbie with main line and branch signal posts present, however this box had closed by 1934 in a cost exercise. An 1891 track plan shows the layout with a single crossover from the down to the up line as they were designated at that time and a set of catch points on the siding protected the main line from runaways. The passing loop was present at this time.

The line had a passing loop close to the junction and another just after the level crossing near the boiler works. A metal girder bridge with two main supporting piers crossed the Old Mill Burn (NY183659) and an embankment carried the line up towards the junction with a pedestrian underpass near the aforementioned bridge.

The 1929 OS map shows a signal box located opposite Newbie Junction on the northern side of the line. The 1938 OS map shows a signal box on the northern side of Newbie Junction. In 1947 the signal box is still shown and it is marked again in 1956.

== The site today ==
A single track branch line ran into the boiler factory that has now been mostly lifted between the junction and the Old Mill Burn Bridge and nothing remains of the Newbie Junction Halt. The large factory site is partly camouflaged by tree plantations and some unused track remains in situ within the works itself. The level crossing has been removed. No signal box is present on the main line and the crossover has been lifted.

Doon Valley Railway volunteers lifted the track from near the junction to the Old Mill Bridge in 1983 for use at their Dunaskin site and Cochran's Ruston and Hornsby 0-4-0 diesel shunter, nicknamed 'Blinkin Bess', is now located at the railway's Dunaskin base in the Doon Valley.

== Sources ==
- Butt, R. V. J. (October 1995). The Directory of Railway Stations: details every public and private passenger station, halt, platform and stopping place, past and present (1st ed.). Sparkford: Patrick Stephens Ltd. ISBN 978-1-85260-508-7. OCLC 60251199. OL 11956311M.
- Lindsay, David M. E. (2002). G&SWR. Register of Stations, Routes and Lines. Kilmarnock:G&SWR Association.
- Wham, Alasdair (2017). Exploring Dumfries & Galloway's Lost Railway Heritage. Catrine:The Oakwood Press. ISBN 9780853610830.
