= Powfoot =

Village in Scotland

Coordinates: 54.97882°N 3.33201°W

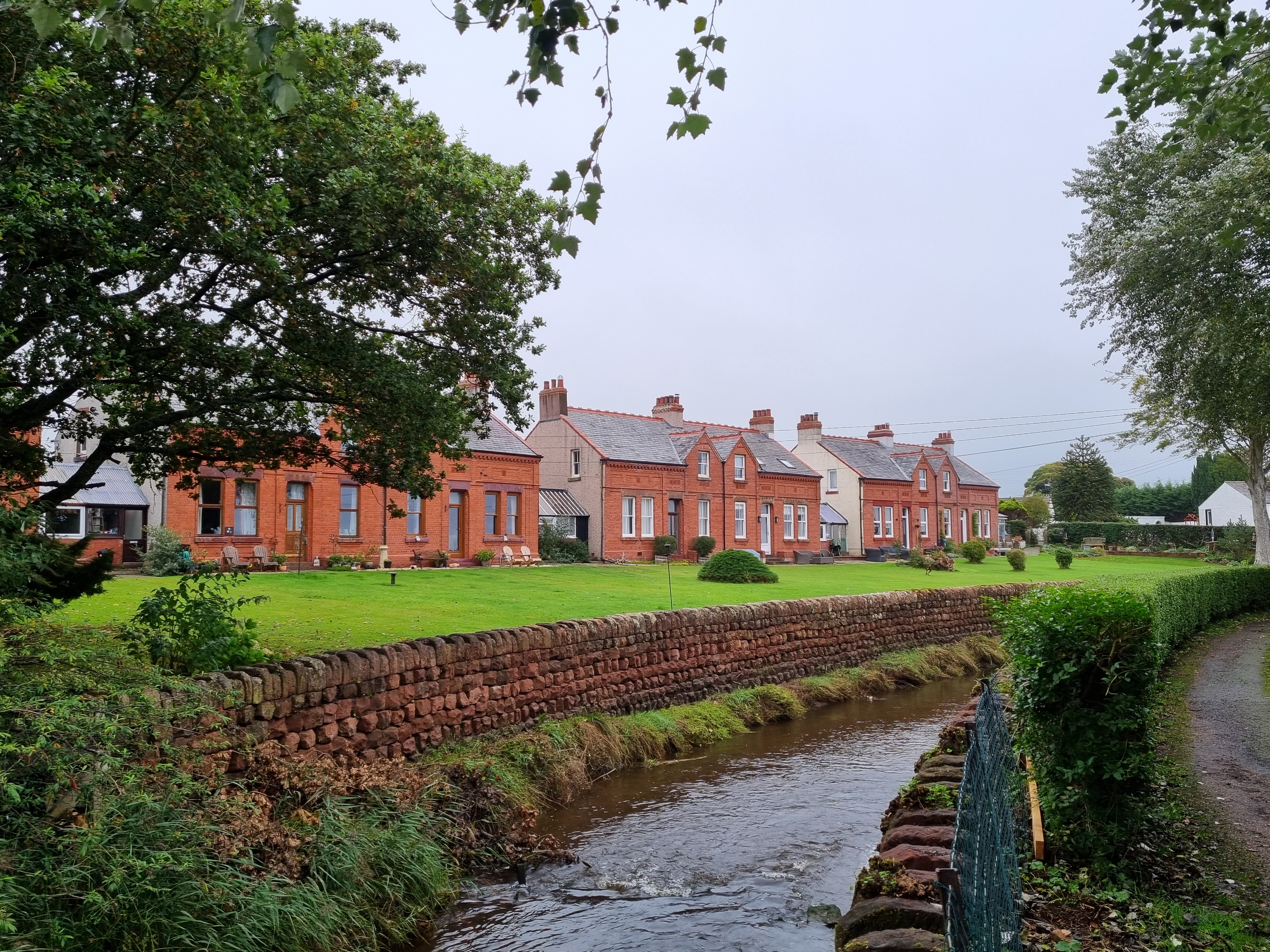
The Pow Water and the B-listed Ellerslie Row Houses

Powfoot is a coastal village in Dumfries and Galloway, Scotland that lies on the northern shore of the Solway Firth.

It is located approximately 4 miles south west of the town of Annan and approximately 1.5 miles south east of the neighbouring village of Cummertrees. The Pow water, a local river runs through the village.

== History ==
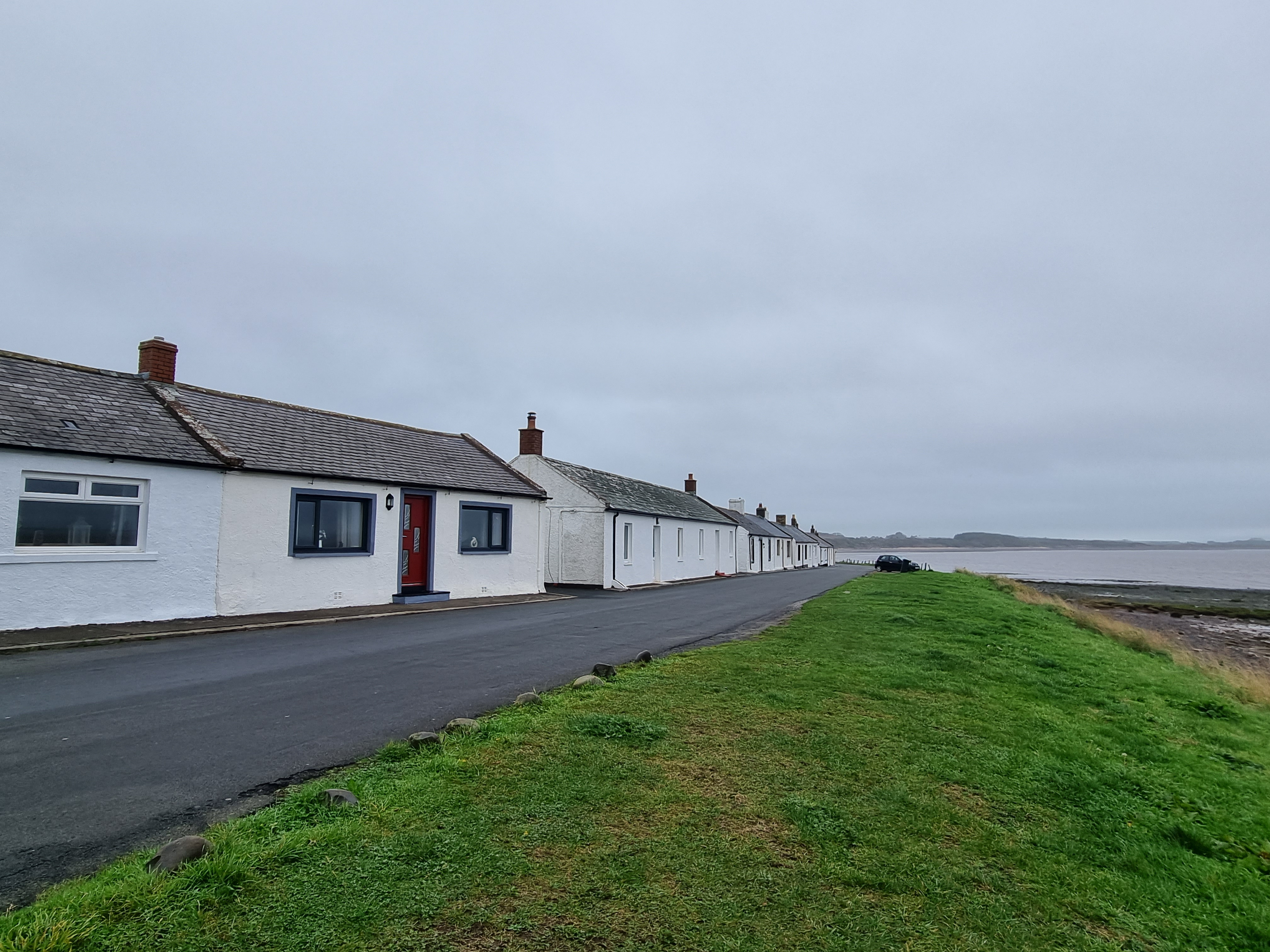
Solway Terrace, Powfoot

The village was begun circa 1800 and originally included a small harbour. The village was expanded several times, as part of wider efforts to create a new seaside resort on the north side of the Solway. John Bell and Joseph Burnie, local builders who had made money in Merseyside, returned to the area in 1894 and developed the characteristic red-Ashlar brick houses that exist today in the centre of the village beside the Pow water. These include the 4 semi-detached villas at 1-8 Ellerslie (built in 1900 to a design by Frank C Carruthers of Lockerbie and Dumfries), the terraced houses at 1-14 Lakeview, and the terrace houses at 1-9 Bella Vista.

The brick buildings at Powfoot were intended to be the start of a planned village seaside resort that was never fully completed. Further funds were to come from the industrialist Edward Brook, who purchased the nearby Kinmount House and Cummertrees. While new roads and ornamental ponds were also laid out, the new resort conflicted with local fishing interests and further building was suspended.

The former village hall was built in 1906 but was abandoned in 2007 and lay derelict until 2017, before it was replaced with a new home that replicated the previous structure.

Powfoot has a tidal swimming pool off the shoreline that is now disused.

=== MOD Powfoot ===
Powfoot was the site of the MOD Powfoot Nitro-cellulose factory. The factory was established by the War Office in 1940 and was supplied with materials by train from Bishopton. The factory was re-opened during the Korean and the Falklands wars. The site was run by Nobel's Explosives on behalf of the Ministry of Defence and Royal Ordnance. The processing facility closed in 1992.

In 1951, the factory was the site of an industrial accident when three workers were killed in an explosion.

== Culture and economy ==
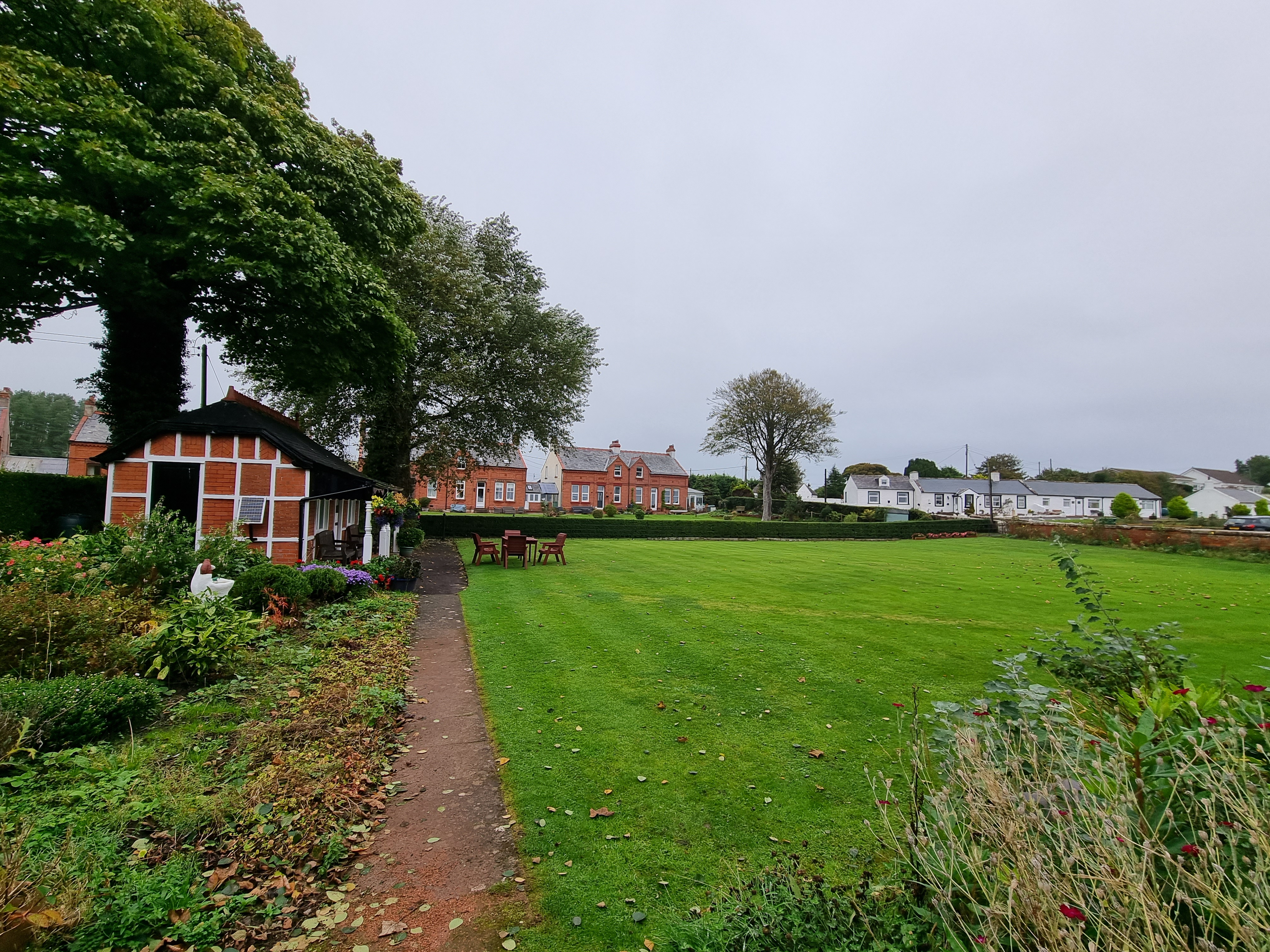
Powfoot bowling green and pavilion (dating from 1907).

The village has a public bowling green and gardens. The gardens are Category B listed and include an Arts and Crafts style bowling pavilion with veranda dating from 1907.

There is a golf course to the west of the village, along with a hotel that was built in 1903.

To the west of the golf course is a large caravan park, with a restaurant and bar. The caravan park was purchased by Verdant Leisure in 2018.

== Transport ==
Powfoot Halt railway station was a railway station that served the factory but is now defunct.

The village has a local bus service between Ruthwell and Annan.
