= Annan railway station =

Railway station in Dumfries and Galloway, Scotland

Annan Scottish Gaelic: Anainn
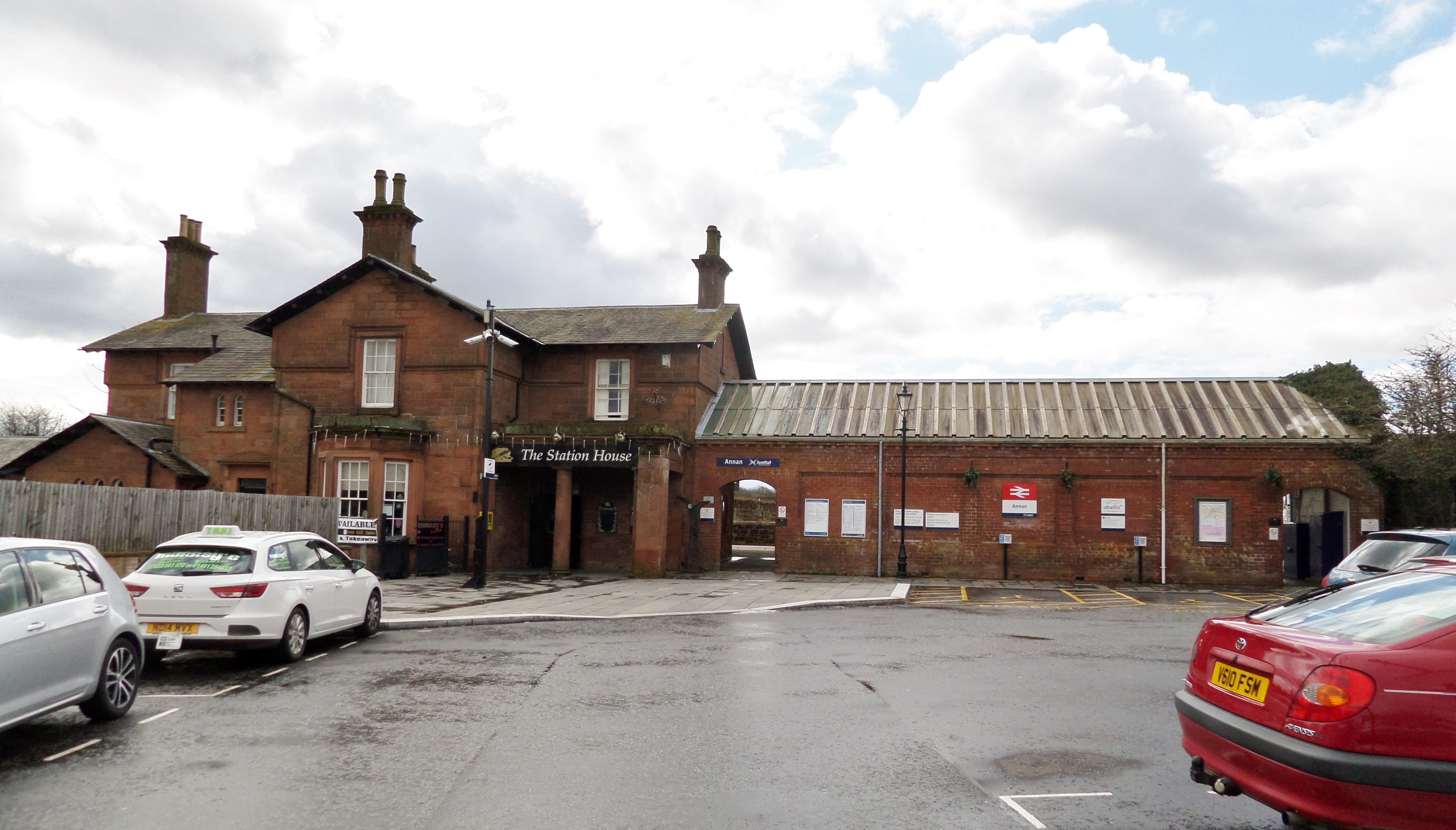

General information
- Location: Annan, Dumfries and Galloway; Scotland
- Coordinates: 54°59′01″N 3°15′44″W
- Grid reference: NY193661
- Owner: Network Rail
- Manager: ScotRail
- Platforms: 2
- Tracks: 2

Other information
- Station code: ANN

History
- Original company: Glasgow, Dumfries and Carlisle Railway
- Pre-grouping: Glasgow and South Western Railway
- Post-grouping: London, Midland and Scottish Railway; British Rail (Scottish Region)

Passengers
- 2020/21: ▼16,448
- 2021/22: ▲81,834
- 2022/23: ▲99,398
- 2023/24: ▲0.128 million
- 2024/25: ▼0.127 million
Location
- Location within Dumfries and Galloway
Notes
- Passenger statistics from the Office of Rail and Road

Annan is a railway station on the Glasgow South Western Line, which runs between Carlisle and Glasgow Central via Kilmarnock. The station, situated 17 miles 51 chains (28 km) north-west of Carlisle, serves the town of Annan in Dumfries and Galloway, Scotland. It is owned by Network Rail and managed by ScotRail.

Shortly after leaving the station, heading west towards Dumfries, the line crosses a viaduct over the River Annan and adjoining flood plains. Also, situated just to the west of the station, is a disused junction and former alignment of a line which used to head south to the Cochran's Boiler Plant at Newbie.

== History ==
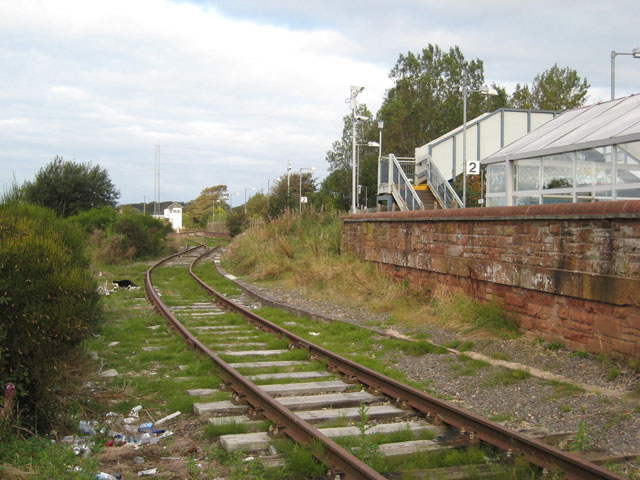
Siding situated to the rear of the station.

Opened by the Glasgow, Dumfries and Carlisle Railway in 1848, then run by the Glasgow and South Western Railway, it became part of the London, Midland and Scottish Railway during the Grouping of 1923. The station then passed on to the Scottish Region of British Railways on nationalisation in 1948.

In 1975, the station became the western end of a single line section to Gretna Green, as part of the route rationalisation carried out by British Rail, following the electrification of the West Coast Main Line and re-signalling scheme, with control shared between the power box at Carlisle and the signal box at the station.

However, the second track was reinstated by Network Rail in 2008, to assist in managing the increased traffic levels, mainly consisting of train loads of imported coal from Hunterston Terminal to power stations in the East Midlands and West Yorkshire.

When sectorisation was introduced in the 1980s, the station was served by ScotRail until the privatisation of British Rail. Until the early 1980s, the goods yard at the station was still in regular use. The station was also used to dispatch fresh fish to London until the mid–to–late 1980s.

== Former stations ==
=== Annan Shawhill ===
The town was previously served by a second railway station, Annan Shawhill, which was opened by the Solway Junction Railway on 8 August 1870. It closed to passengers on 27 April 1931, and to goods traffic in 1955. It was situated on the long-disused Solway Junction Railway, which ran between Kirtlebridge and Maryport, operating across the Solway Firth.

=== Newbie Junction Halt ===
Newbie Junction Halt was located to the west of the Annan Viaduct, and briefly (between 1898–1904) served a nearby boiler factory, as well as a brick and tile works. Trains called in the mornings and evenings, for workers only.

== Services ==
Following the May 2021 timetable change, there is a mostly an uneven hourly to 2 hourly service (Monday to Saturday) heading north-west towards Dumfries, with seven trains of these to Glasgow Central via Kilmarnock. On Sunday, there are five trains per day to Dumfries, two of which extend to Glasgow Central. Heading south-east towards Carlisle, there is a mostly hourly service. All trains are operated by ScotRail.

Services running through Carlisle to Newcastle were stopped at the May 2022 timetable change.

Rolling stock used: Class 156 Super Sprinter

Preceding station	National Rail	Following station
Gretna Green	ScotRail; Glasgow South Western Line	Dumfries
	Historical railways	
Eastriggs; Line open; station closed	Glasgow and South Western Railway; Glasgow, Dumfries and Carlisle Railway	Cummertrees; Line open; station closed
Bowness; Line and station closed	Caledonian Railway; Solway Junction Railway	Terminus

== Sources ==
- Butt, R. V. J. (October 1995). The Directory of Railway Stations: details every public and private passenger station, halt, platform and stopping place, past and present (1st ed.). Sparkford: Patrick Stephens Ltd. ISBN 978-1-85260-508-7. OCLC 60251199. OL 11956311M.
- Jowett, Alan (March 1989). Jowett's Railway Atlas of Great Britain and Ireland: From Pre-Grouping to the Present Day (1st ed.). Sparkford: Patrick Stephens Ltd. ISBN 978-1-85260-086-0. OCLC 22311137.
- Jowett, Alan (2000). Jowett's Nationalised Railway Atlas (1st ed.). Penryn, Cornwall: Atlantic Transport Publishers. ISBN 978-0-906899-99-1. OCLC 228266687.
