= Cummertrees =

Coordinates: 54°59′08″N 3°20′49″W

Cummertrees: Scottish Gaelic: Comar na Drise
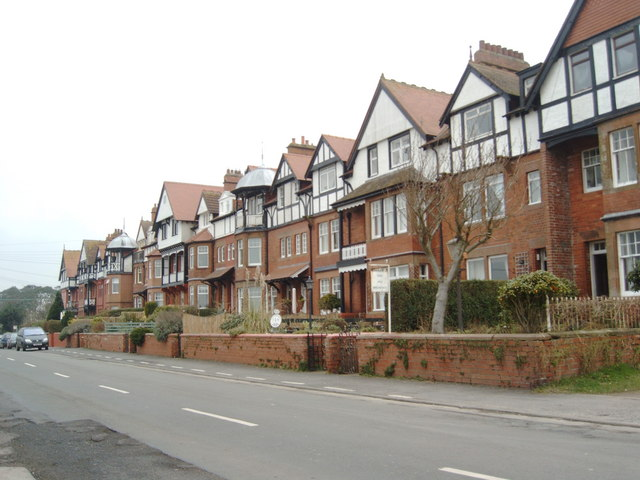
- Seaside-style holiday houses in Cummertrees's Queensberry Terrace

- Location within Dumfries and Galloway
- OS grid reference: NY141664
- Council area: Dumfries and Galloway
- Lieutenancy area: Dumfriesshire
- Country: Scotland
- Sovereign state: United Kingdom
- Post town: ANNAN
- Postcode district: DG12
- Police: Scotland
- Fire: Scottish
- Ambulance: Scottish
- UK Parliament: Dumfriesshire, Clydesdale and Tweeddale
- Scottish Parliament: Dumfriesshire

Cummertrees is a coastal village and civil parish of Annandale in the historical county of Dumfriesshire in Dumfries and Galloway. It lies about 1 mile (1.6 km) inland, on the Pow Water to the northwest of Powfoot, 12 miles (19 km) from Dumfries and 3 miles (5 km) from Annan.

== Etymology ==
Cummertrees, recorded as Cumbertres in 1204 and 1207, is probably of Cumbric origin. The second element represents *tres 'strife, tumult, violence', cognate with Welsh tres and Gaelic treas. The first element is *cümber, cömber 'confluence. Andrew Breeze proposes the meaning 'confluence of turbulent water'. Alan James suggests that *tres may have been a stream-name.

However, James notes that the first element may represent *cömbröɣ, which occurs in the name Cumbria.

== History ==
Cummertrees is rural, primarily residential village; the parish includes Powfoot and Trailtrow and is bounded by St Mungo and Hoddam, Annan, the Solway Firth, and Ruthwell and Dalton. A Public hall was erected at Cummertrees in 1893. The river Annan is at the northern boundary. It has a wide area of level sand swept by the Solway 'bore' which can move at around ten miles an hour and can often be heard throughout the parish. The seaboard is low and sandy and features in Walter Scott's novel Redgauntlet. The ground rises a little inland, to 350 feet (107 m) on Repentance Hill.

The local geology is mainly Devonian, with old limestone workings at Kelhead and some sandstone quarries.

In a field called Bruce's Acres, at Broom Farm, Robert Bruce fought and lost a skirmish against the Southron (English).

Cummertrees parish includes some notable buildings, Hoddam Castle, Kinmount House and Murraythwaite. Historically, the main landowner has been the Marquess of Queensberry. A nearby caravan park has been named after them. The church was founded by Robert Bruce and has been much rebuilt and enlarged. The Douglas Family Mausoleum at Cummertrees parish church is traditional burial place of the Marquesses of Queensberry. There is also a private family burial ground dating from the mid 19th century for the Queensberry family on Gooley Hill within the policies of Kinmount House.

=== Kinmount House ===
Kinmount House was the seat of the Marquesses of Queensberry, described by Groome in 1903 as a beautiful edifice, built in the early part of the 19th century at a cost of £40,000, and surrounded by fine pleasure grounds.

== Transport ==
Cummertrees railway station was opened in 1848 by the Glasgow, Dumfries and Carlisle Railway, which then became part of the Glasgow and South Western Railway. It was closed by the British Railways Board in 1955. The fine station building survives as a private residence.

The village is now served by buses operated by Stagecoach Cumbria & North Lancashire. Route 79 provides an approximately hourly service west to Dumfries and east to Annan and Carlisle.

== Views of Cummertrees ==
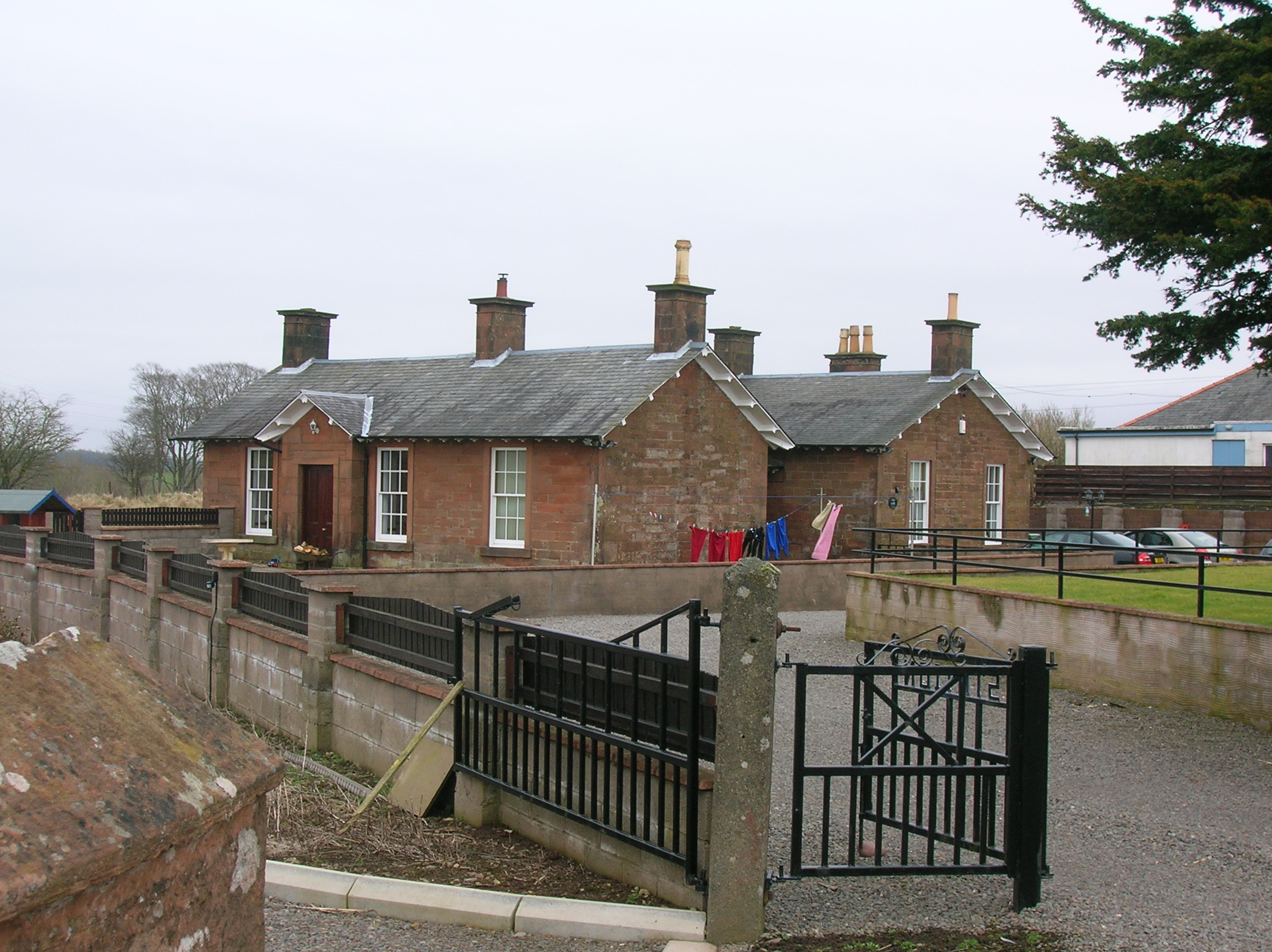
The old Cummertrees railway station.

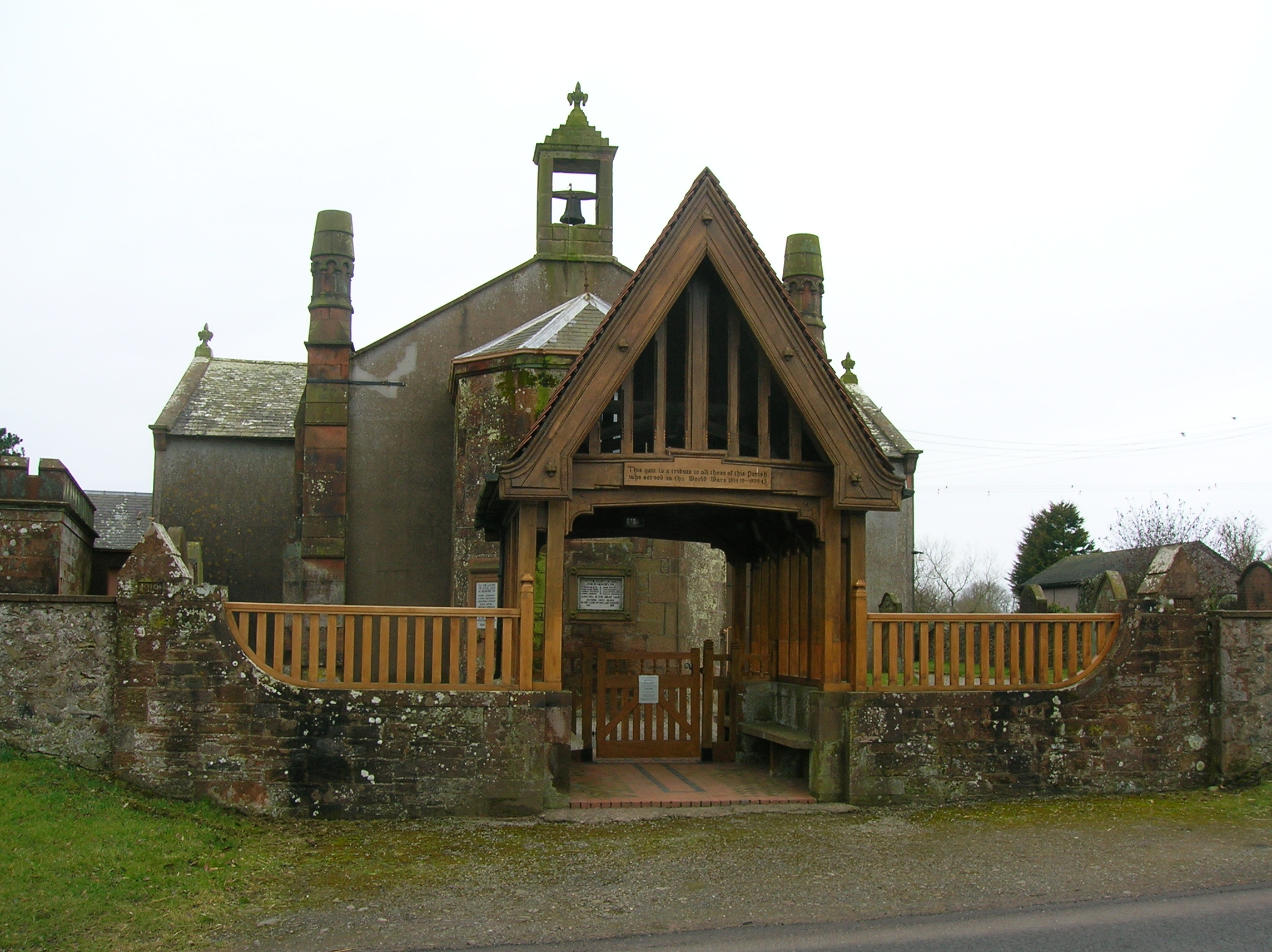
The parish church and lychgate.

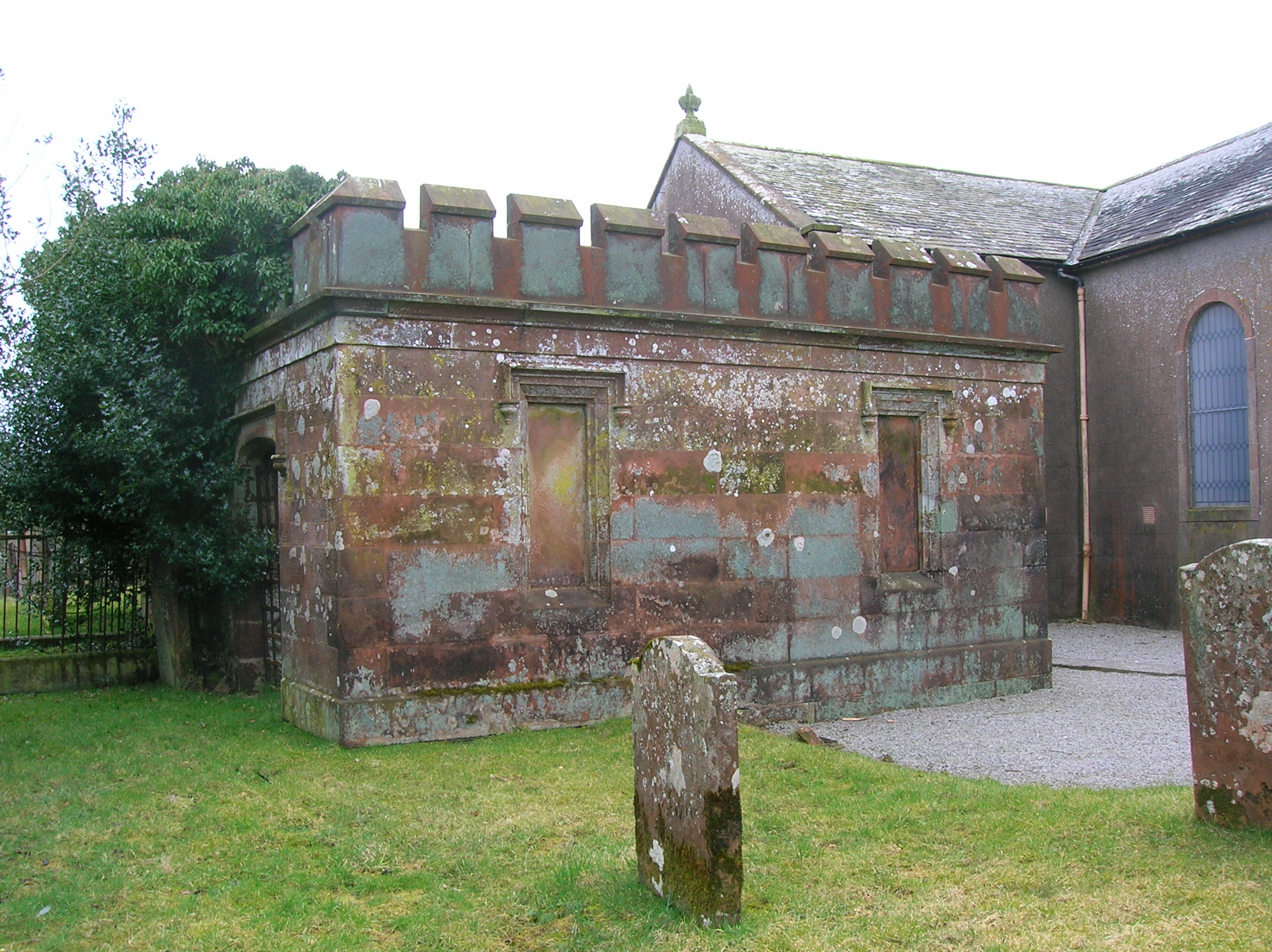
The Douglas Family Mausoleum at Cummertrees Parish Church, traditional burial place of the Marquesses of Queensberry.

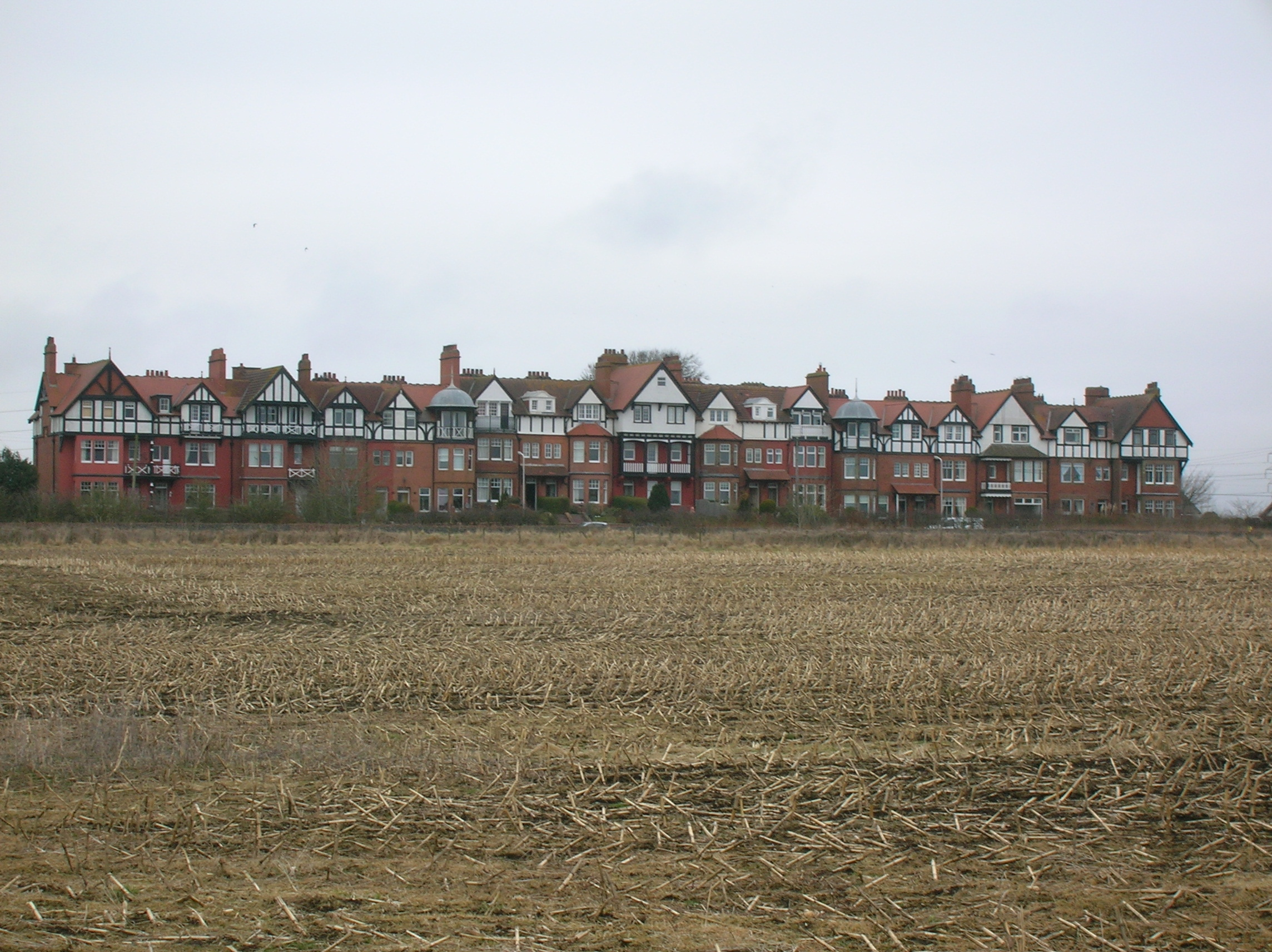
Holiday apartments at Agnes Hill.

== Notable residents ==
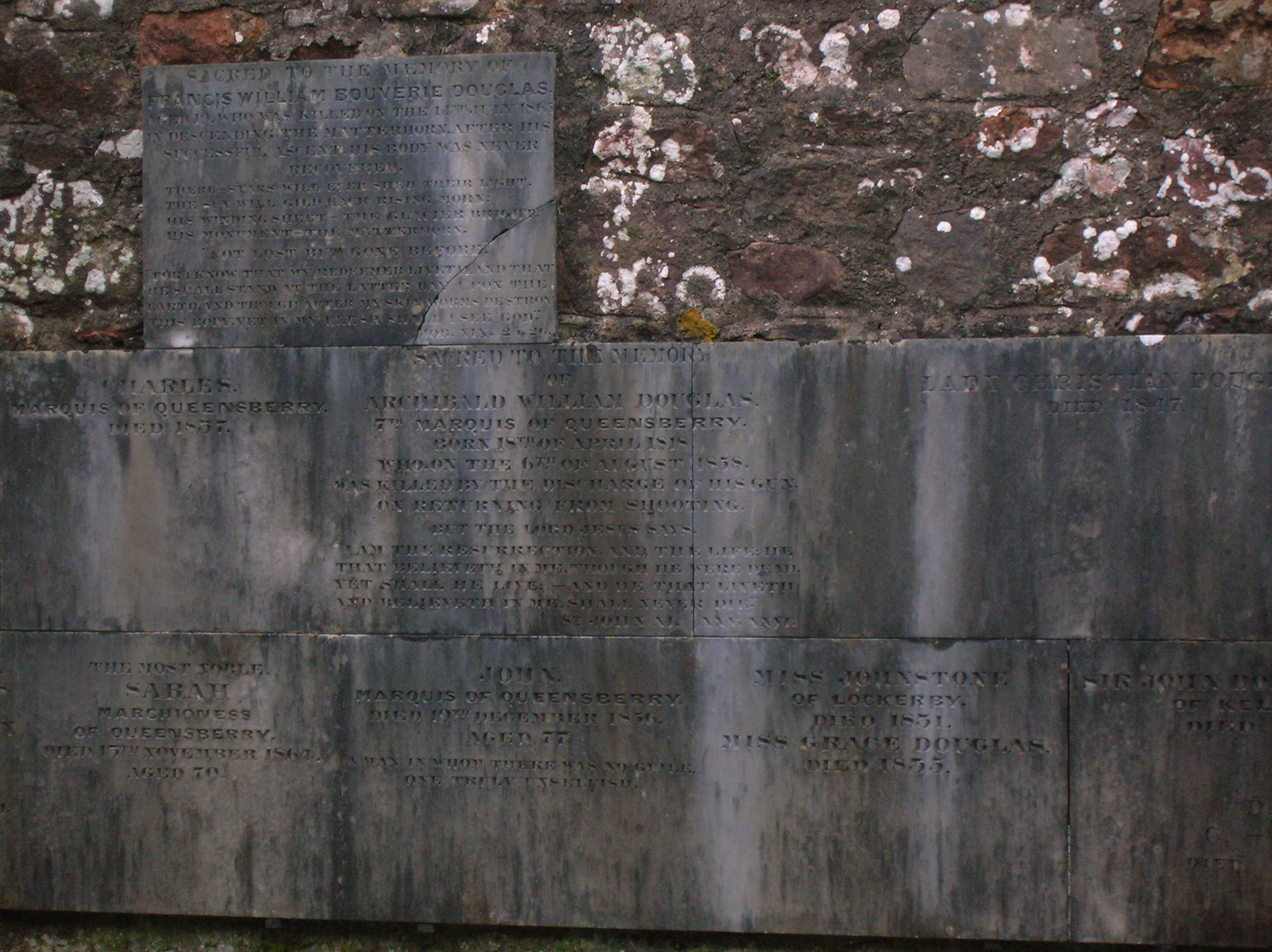
Memorial to Lord Francis Douglas in Cummertrees Parish Church.

- Lady Florence Dixie (1855-1905), travel writer, war correspondent, and feminist, a daughter of the 8th Marquess of Queensberry, was born and lived much of her later life on the Kinmount estate at Glenstewart House after her husband lost his family seat through gambling. She had married Sir Alexander Beaumont Churchill Dixie, 11th Baronet (1851-1924), known as "Sir A.B.C.D."
- Lord Francis Douglas (1847 – 14 July 1865) was a British mountaineer born in Cummertrees. After sharing in the first ascent of the Matterhorn, he died in a fall on the way down from the summit, aged just eighteen.
- Steve Ovett lived at Kinmount House from 1988 to 1998.
