= Newbie, Dumfries and Galloway =

Coordinates: 54.974°N 3.281°W

Newbie
- Location within Dumfries and Galloway
- Council area: Dumfries and Galloway
- Lieutenancy area: Dumfries
- Country: Scotland
- Sovereign state: United Kingdom
- Post town: ANNAN
- Postcode district: DG12
- Dialling code: 01461
- Police: Scotland
- Fire: Scottish
- Ambulance: Scottish
- UK Parliament: Dumfriesshire, Clydesdale and Tweeddale
- Scottish Parliament: Dumfriesshire

Newbie is a populated place in Annandale South, near Annan. It is home to a pharmaceutics plant belonging to Phoenix Chemicals of Liverpool.

The Annandale Way Great Trail has a trailhead at Newbie Barns, a small collection of dwellings in Newbie.

== History ==
James VI of Scotland came to the region in November 1597 to address border issues. Henry Leigh or Lee, an English depute warden and servant of Lord Scrope came to Newbie to meet the King, who was holding his council accompanied by the Duke of Lennox, the Earl of Glencairn, Walter Stewart of Blantyre, Lord Ochiltree, Lord Sempill, Lord Herries, the Lairds of Lochinvar, Johnson, Closeburn, Murray of Cockpool, and others. John Johnston, laird of Newbie was a depute border warden.

A tower house or castle at Newbie owned by the Johnston family and the Earls of Hartfell was demolished. Some masonry quoins from the tower decorated with characteristic Scottish renaissance buckle carvings were used in more recent farm buildings.
