= Newbie Junction Halt railway station =

Railway station in Dumfries and Galloway, Scotland

Coordinates: 54.9848°N 3.2790°W

Newbie Junction
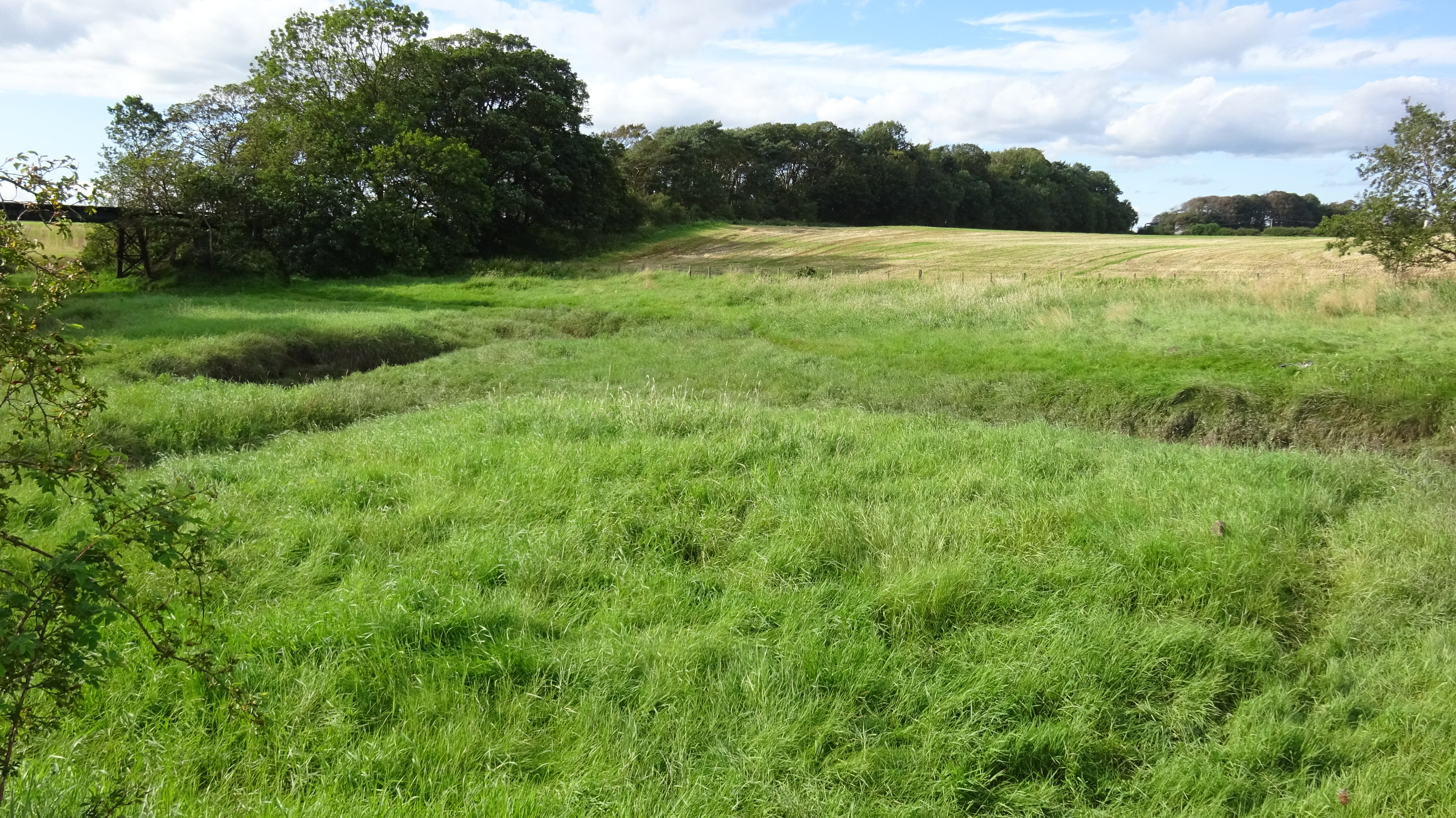
- View towards the site of Newbie Junction

General information
- Location: Annan, Dumfries and Galloway; Scotland
- Grid reference: NY182663
- Platforms: 2

Other information
- Status: Disused

History
- Original company: G&SWR

Key dates
- By 1898: Opened
- By 1904: Closed
Location

Newbie Junction Halt railway station was a railway station in Dumfries and Galloway, Scotland. It was located just west of Annan on the old Glasgow and South Western Railway main line and briefly served workers employed 0.5 mile or 800 metres away at the Cochran & Co. Boiler factory and the Newbie Brick and Tile Works at Newbie. The Newbie Siding branched off near the halt and was accessed from the west.

== History ==
The halt was not open to the general public and only served workers at the factories served by the Newbie Branch. Trains served this workers' halt in the morning and evening. It is unknown if workers were taken to their destination by rail or whether they walked the short half-mile, however it seems unlikely given the short distance and a passenger carriage would be required and a platform of some description at the end of the line. In 1929, the Newbie Brick and Tile Works closed and the railway was demolished, and housing was constructed for the boiler factory employees. The halt opened around 1898 and was closed around 1904.

== Operation ==
In 1898, the key for Newbie Junction was kept in an Annan railway station signal box and the Newbie Junction box was opened as required by a porter travelling by train from Annan. At the time, no trains were permitted to call at Newbie Branch Junction during foggy weather or between sunset and sunrise unless the Main Line and Branch Signals were lit.

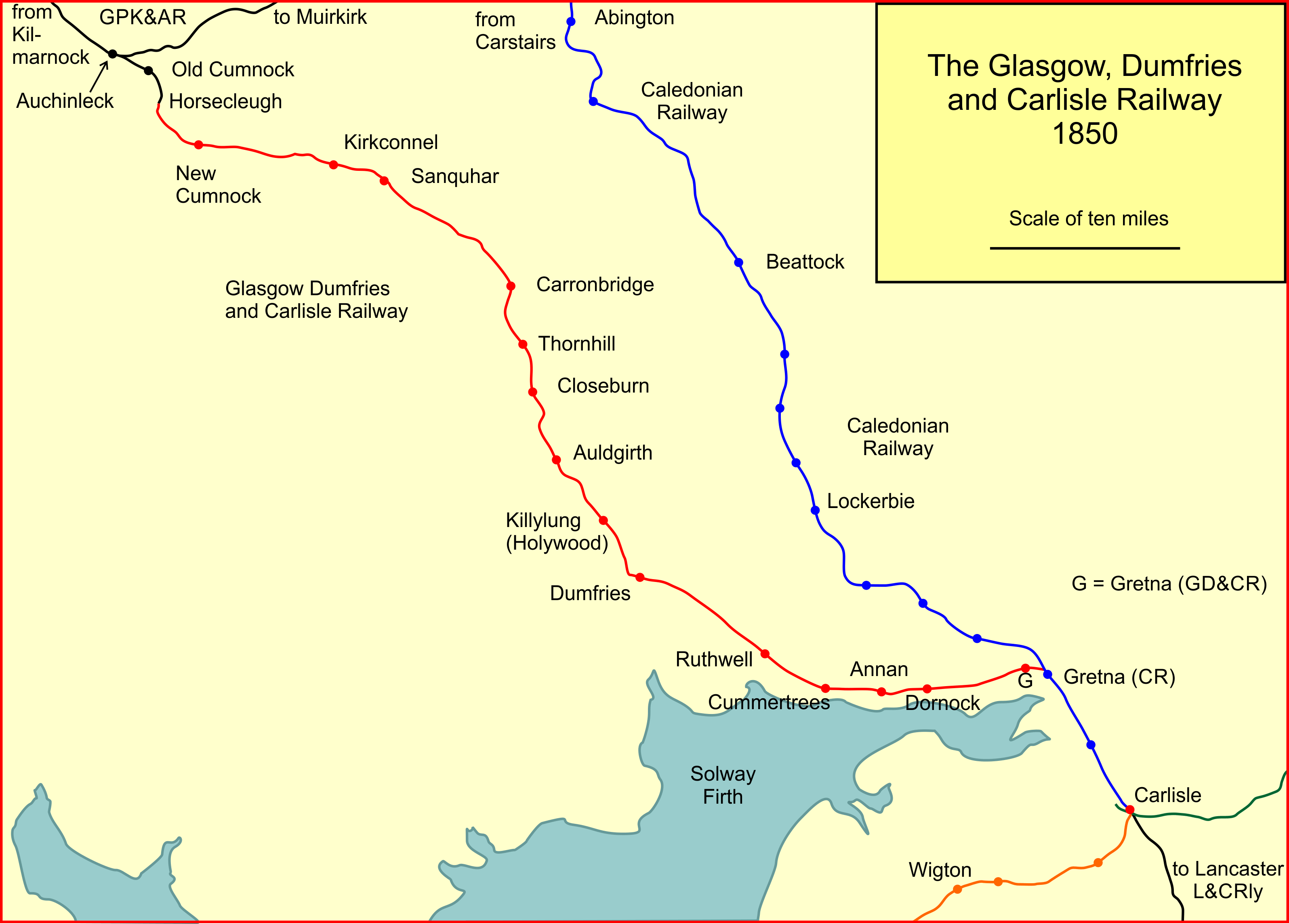
System map of the public passenger stations on the line

If a train had to call at Newbie Junction the following procedures were to be followed with "Is Line Clear?" signalled "as applicable to a train calling at an intermediate siding in a Block Section must be sent to Cummertrees. The signalman in Annan Cabin must not allow a Down Train to follow until the "Line Clear" or "Train out of Section" Signal, as the case may be has been received from Cummertrees, indicating that the train which called at Newbie Branch Junction has arrived complete with the tail lamp attached, and has passed forward clear of the section, or been shunted clear of the Down Line."

== Infrastructure ==
The halt stood on a double-track section of track and the mineral branch was served by trains from the west. No details survive of the station's construction; however, it is likely to have been built of wood. The halt was 73 miles (117 km) from Kilmarnock railway station. A signal box stood on the south side of the line here, opposite the junction to Newbie with main line and branch signal posts present. A network of lanes joined the station site with the nearby factories via Milnfield and a path running beside the River Annan.

== The site today ==
The single-track Newbie Branch line ran into the boiler factory, which has now been mostly lifted; nothing remains of the halt. The large factory site is partly camouflaged by tree plantations and some unused tracks remain in situ within the works itself. No signal box is present, and an old crossover has been lifted.

Preceding station	Historical railways	Following station
Cummertrees; Line open; station closed	Glasgow and South Western Railway; Glasgow, Dumfries and Carlisle Railway	Annan; Line open; station open

== Sources ==
- Butt, R. V. J. (October 1995). The Directory of Railway Stations: details every public and private passenger station, halt, platform and stopping place, past and present (1st ed.). Sparkford: Patrick Stephens Ltd. ISBN 978-1-85260-508-7. OCLC 60251199. OL 11956311M.
- Lindsay, David M. E. (2002). G&SWR. Register of Stations, Routes and Lines. Kilmarnock:G&SWR Association.
- Wham, Alasdair (2017). Exploring Dumfries & Galloway's Lost Railway Heritage. Catrine:The Oakwood Press. ISBN 9780853610830.
