= Cummertrees railway station =

Former railway station in Scotland

Coordinates: 54°59′10″N 3°20′50″W

Cummertrees
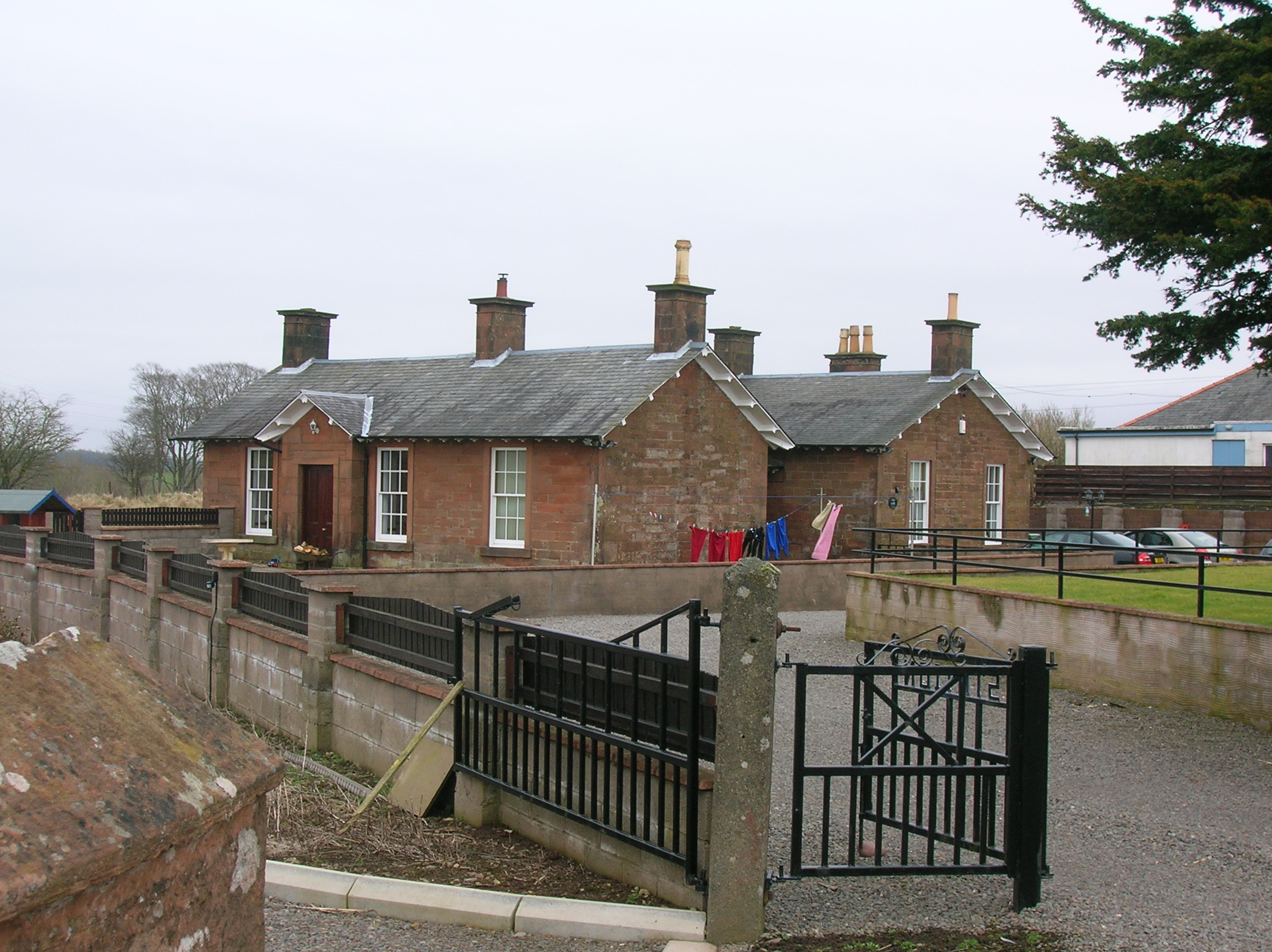
- Cummertrees station from the mainstreet in 2010

General information
- Location: Cummertrees, Dumfries and Galloway; Scotland
- Platforms: 2

Other information
- Status: Disused

History
- Original company: Glasgow, Dumfries and Carlisle Railway
- Pre-grouping: Glasgow and South Western Railway
- Post-grouping: LMS

Key dates
- 23 August 1848: Opened
- 19 September 1955: Closed
- 6 August 1964: Closed to goods traffic
Location

Cummertrees railway station was a railway station in Dumfries and Galloway south of Dumfries, serving the village of Cummertrees. The village lies some 3 miles (4.8 km) west of Annan and 12 miles (19 km) south of Lockerbie.

== History ==
The station opened in 1848. The station is now closed, although the line running through the station remains open. The station building has been converted into a private dwelling.

Cummertrees was opened by the Glasgow, Dumfries and Carlisle Railway, which then became part of the Glasgow and South Western Railway; in 1923 it became part of the London Midland and Scottish Railway at the Grouping, passing on to the Scottish Region of British Railways following the 1948 nationalisation of the railways. It was closed by British Railways in 1955. The station lay 70.47 miles (113.41 km) south of the old terminus at Glasgow St Enoch.

An unstaffed siding at the station was closed 1 April 1959. A Cummertrees Lime siding existed nearby with a narrow-gauge railway link to the Kellhead lime works.

The village of Cummertrees developed around the station.

The National Archives of Scotland hold a full collection of plans for the station of various dates.

The stylish and sizeable station buildings reflect the fact that the station served nearby Kinmount House, once seat of the Marquesses of Queensberry, described by Groome as "a beautiful edifice, built in the early part of the 19th century."

Powfoot Halt on the line towards Annan once served the Powfoot MOD Nitro-cellulose factory. Newbie Junction Halt railway station was another workers only halt that existed between 1898 and 1904 close to Annan where it served the factory workers of Cochran's & Co. boilers and the Newbie Brick and Tile works.

== Services ==
Preceding station	Historical railways	Following station
Ruthwell; Line open; station closed	Glasgow and South Western Railway; Glasgow, Dumfries and Carlisle Railway	Annan; Line open; station open
