= Newbie Castle =

Ancient castle in Scotland

- Annan, Dumfries and Galloway, Scotland; UK grid reference NY17426469
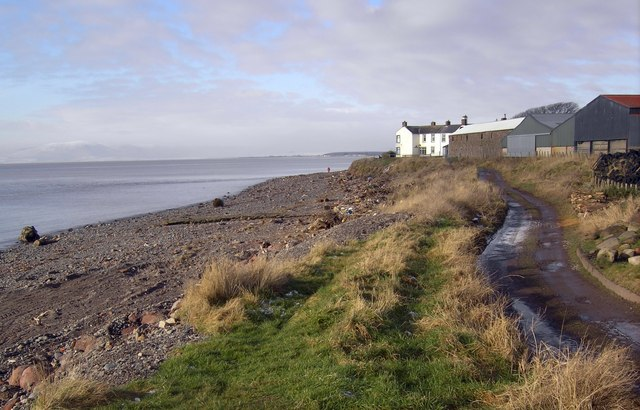
- Newbie Mains Farm. Site of Newbie Castle

Site information
- Type: Tower house
- Owner: Newbie Mains Farm
- Open to the public: No
- Condition: Demolished 1816.

Location
- Newbie Castle
- Location within Scotland
- Coordinates: 54.97001°N 3.29144°W

Site history
- Built: By 1526
- Built by: Corrie

The site of the old Newbie Castle, Newbay Castle or Newby Castle was the caput of the Barony of Newbie near Annan close to the confluence of the River Annan and the Solway Firth in Dumfries and Galloway, Scotland. Held by the Corries and then the Johnstones. Newbie Harbour on the River Annan was located nearby.

== History ==
Newbie Castle was demolished circa 1816 when Newbie Mains Farm was constructed, using the stones from the castle. Some masonry quoins from the tower decorated with characteristic Scottish renaissance buckle carvings were used in the farm buildings.

In the 13th century, the Battle of Bruce's Acres took place near Muirbeck Wood as shown on the 1926 Edition of the OS map. Robert the Bruce is said to have suffered a defeat here. Human bones and several swords were uncovered in Newbie Moss close to the field where this action is said to have been fought.

== Description of the castle and lands ==
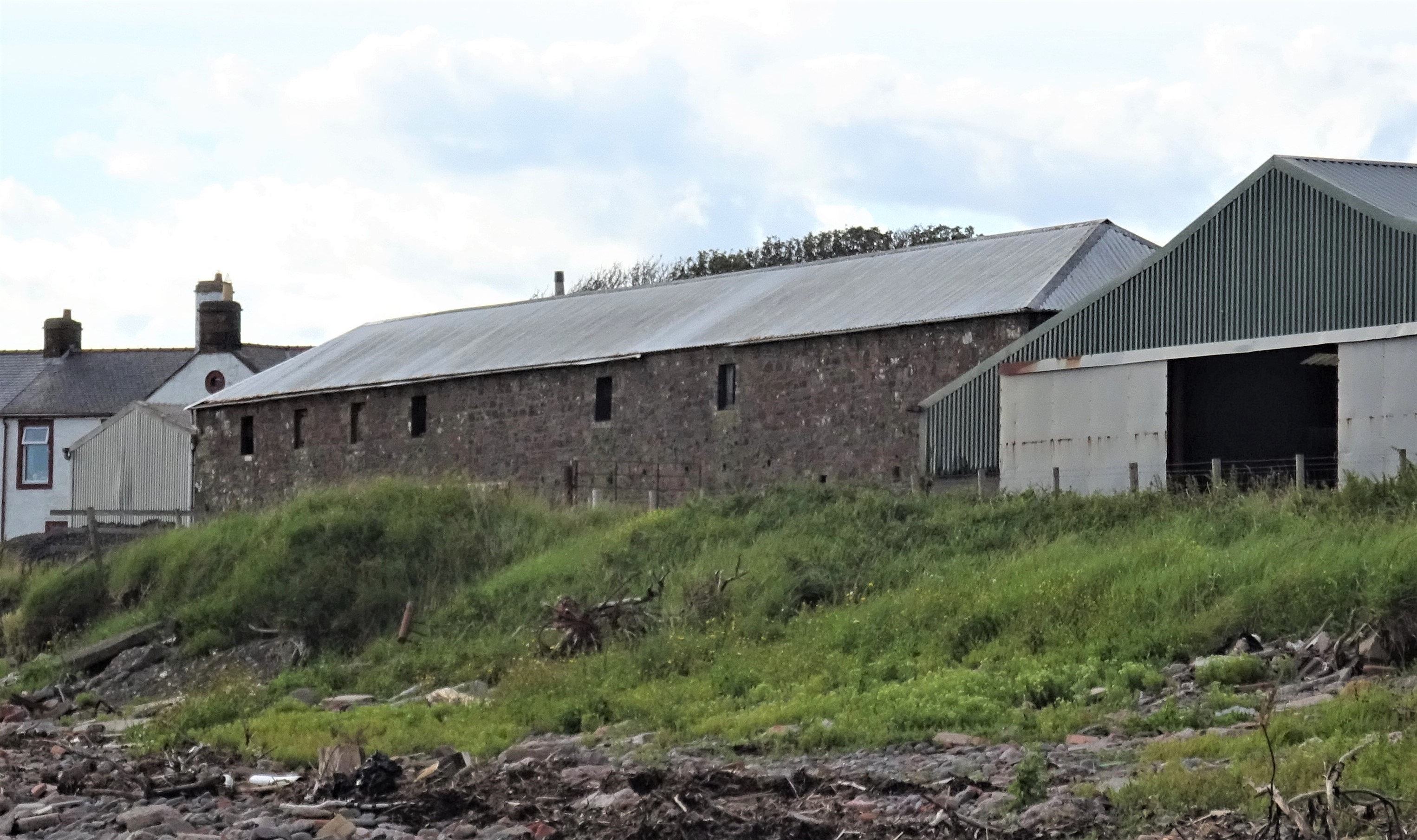
The Newbie Mains byre with stonework from the old castle

Newbie is considered to have been a tower castle, surrounded by a moat with drawbridge. A tree in a nearby plantation is marked as the Marquesses Tree on early Ordnance Survey maps. Newbie Castle had been damaged in various sieges and the laird appropriated his relative Robert Johnstone's legacies to use stone intended for a bridge over the River Annan to build a modern extension to the existing old square tower.

The Newbie Burn runs down from Newbie Muir and enters the sea at Newbie Mains. In 1859, two sets of stone coffins or kistvaens with human remains were found close to the shoreline just to the west of Newbie Mains Farm towards Newbie Cottages.

=== Newbie Mill ===
The old Newbie Barony mill was powered by the Old Mill Burn with the headwaters at Newbie Loch, now drained. In the 1848-1858 OS Name Book Newbie Mill describes the mill present at that date as "A large mill three storeys high with dwelling house and offices attached all in good repair. It is wrought by water; and is used for grinding wheat and corn and is occupied by Thomas Martin: and is the property of Edward McKenzie Esqr. Folly Court London. This Mill contains 5 pairs of stones and 1 for barley - it is 18 horsepower - having also a thrashing Machine".

== The Lairds of Newbie ==
Thomas Corrie of Kelwood and Newbie died in 1513, possibly at the Battle of Flodden. The Johnstone family acquired possession of Newbie after a series of disputes. Kelwood was held by the Corrie's until at least 1627.

John Johnstone of Newbie was listed as supporter of Mary, Queen of Scots in February 1569. Newbie was held latterly by the Marquises of Annandale.

Sir James Johnstone purchased the Barony of Newbie, but it took twenty-four years of legal action before the last of the relatives of the Corries resigned their titles. He died with significant debts as a result of the litigation. Robert Johnstone of Raecleuch moved into Newbie Castle as the legal tutor or guardian of his heir, the new young laird. The creditors attempted to have the Johnstones removed, including Edward Johnstone of Ryehill, the laird's brothers David and Abraham, Adam and John Johnstone of Mylnfield, his grandson John, several nephews. By 1609 Edward Johnstone had use of part of the property. In 1639 the Corries of Kelwood and Newbie resumed legal action against John's widow Bessie and their son George. The history of the lairds is a complex series of costly legal disputes amongst the wider family.

The barony of Newbie was held latterly by the Marquises of Annandale who were members of the Johnstone clan.

== Historical incidents ==
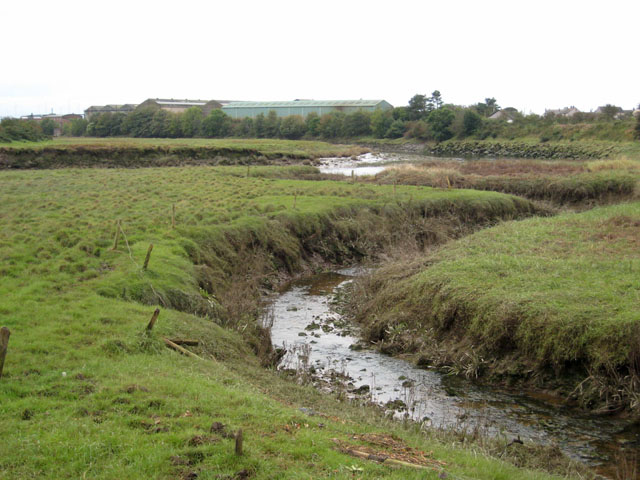
Site of the old Newbie Harbour

James VI of Scotland visited Newbie in November 1597 and held a council with his lords. The laird of Newbie was a depute border warden.

In 1618 Annan Town Council had "for the safe transport of his Majesty’s subjects, and in respect of the great poverty of the said burgh, had kept a boat and exacted dues, and now John Johnstone, burgess of Annan, also called John of Mylnfield, and others, would not let it pass their land".

Sir John Dalziel of Glennie and others travelled "to the Lord Annandale’s house at Newbie to pay him a visit, beginning with their old pranks, burning their shirts and other linens. A little after that the house was all burnt, and it was reported of my lord himself he knew the house would never do good, for it was builded with the thing that should have builded the bridge over Annan water. It is said that the servants in the house were amusing themselves with drinking burnt brandy while Lord Annandale was away, and his coach driving suddenly to the door, they thrust the blazing spirits under a bed which caused the conflagration. The blaze was so great that the chambermaids in Sir John Douglas’s house at Kelhead, three miles distant, could prepare the bedrooms without candles.

== Newbie Castle recorded on early maps ==
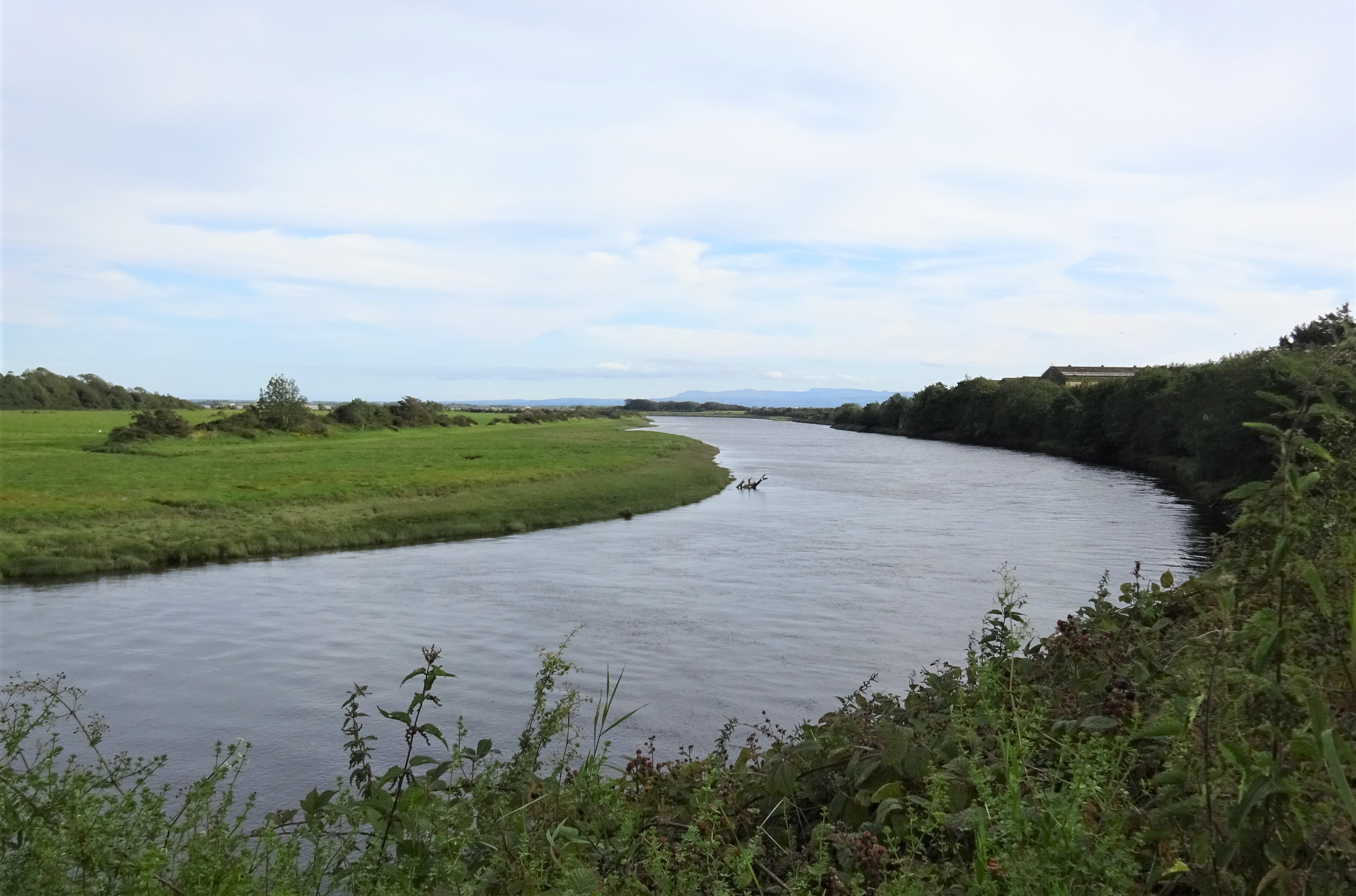
The River Annan from near Newbie Harbour

Blaeu's map of 1654, based on Timothy Pont's earlier map, shows a tower with associated buildings and extensive formal gardens with plantations or orchards. A small building is shown nearby overlooking the shore and a small island is present just off the coast. A circular wooded area surrounded by a pale or fence lies just to the north. The name is written as 'New bay Castle' and Newbay Loch is shown nearby with an outflow running into the River Annan.

Herman Moll's 1732 map shows the situation unchanged from Blaeu's map. Roys mid-18th century map shows the castle; however, the circular wooded area and island are not recorded.

The 1804 Crawford map shows 'Newby Old Tower' without any garden or woodland features.

John Ainslie's 1821 map records a 'Tower', but again without any garden or other estate features. In 1828 the situation remained unchanged. By 1857 the name 'Newbie' is used on maps and the location of the old castle is indicated.

In 1857, the OS map shows the 'Marquis' Tree' in a small plantation to the north-east of the old castle. In 1924, the site of the tree is still indicated. The pear tree is said to have been planted by one of the Marquises of Annandale in the old Castle Garden.

=== Newby Harbour ===
Crawford's 1804 records Newby Harbour lying nearby as an inlet off the River Annan. In 1821, Ainslie's map records Newby Harbour, although an inlet is not shown. The harbour is shown as an inlet in 1828. The Old Mill Burn has its confluence with the River Annan at the harbour. The harbour site has silted up due to the building of stone piers on the river that direct the water flow and maintain a deep water channel for shipping using Annan Harbour. It now forms part of Milnfield Merse. No details survive as to the function of the harbour; however, before the bridge was built, an easy crossing of the River Annan would require a boat of some description.
