= Annan, Dumfries and Galloway =

Coordinates: 54.983°N 3.266°W

Annan: Scottish Gaelic: Anainn; Scots: Annan
- Town
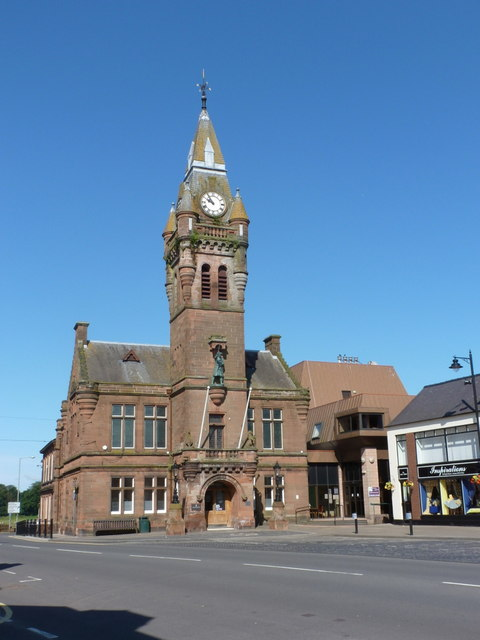
- Annan Town Hall

- Location within Dumfries and Galloway
- Population: 8,695 (2022)
- OS grid reference: NY 192 661
  - Edinburgh: 67 mi (108 km)
  - London: 273 mi (439 km)
- Council area: Dumfries and Galloway
- Lieutenancy area: Dumfries
- Country: Scotland
- Sovereign state: United Kingdom
- Post town: ANNAN
- Postcode district: DG12
- Dialling code: 01461
- Police: Scotland
- Fire: Scottish
- Ambulance: Scottish
- UK Parliament: Dumfriesshire, Clydesdale and Tweeddale
- Scottish Parliament: Dumfriesshire

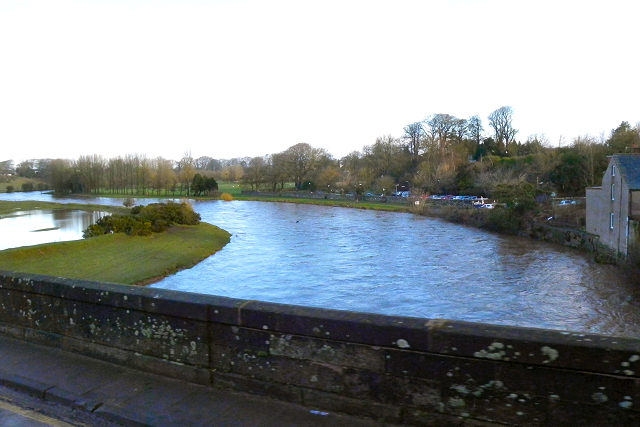
Annan, with Mote of Annan to the right

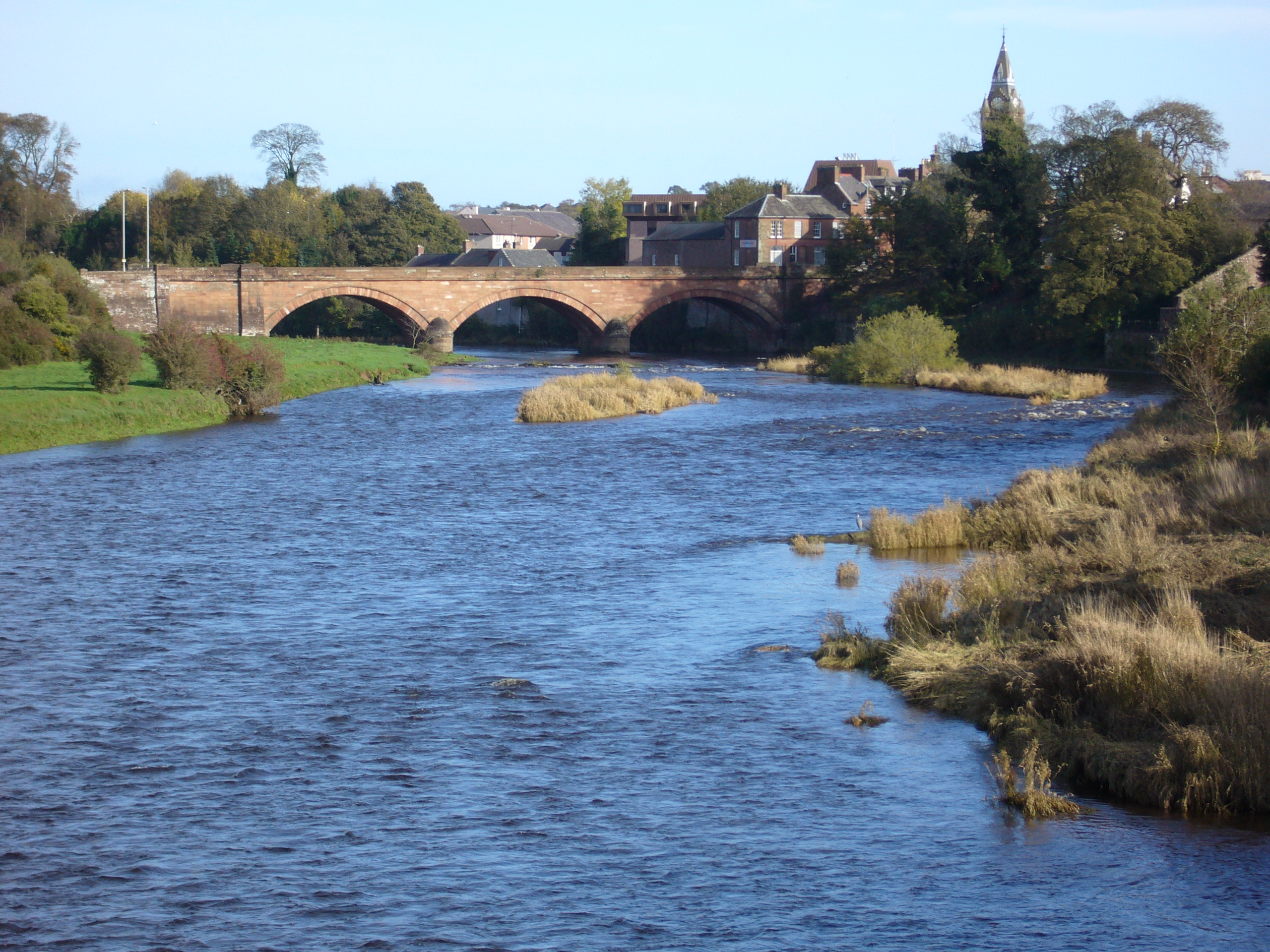
Annan River road bridge

Annan (/ˈænən/ AN-ən; Scottish Gaelic: Inbhir Anainn) is a historic market town and royal burgh in Dumfries and Galloway, south-west Scotland. It is 15 miles (24 km) from Dumfries by rail, in the region of Dumfries and Galloway on the Solway Firth in the south of Scotland. Eastriggs is about 3 miles (5 km) to the east, while Gretna and the English border is about 8 miles (13 km) to the east. It had a population of 8,695 in 2022.

Each year on the first Saturday in July, Annan celebrates the Royal Charter and the boundaries of the Royal Burgh are confirmed when a mounted cavalcade undertakes the Riding of the Marches. Entertainment includes a procession, sports, field displays and massed pipe bands. Annan's in America first migrated to New York and Virginia. Annandale Virginia is an early settlement which celebrates The Scottish Games annually.

== Geography ==
Historically part of Dumfriesshire, its public buildings include Annan Academy, of which the writer Thomas Carlyle was a pupil, and a Georgian building now known as "Bridge House". Annan also features a Historic Resources Centre. In Port Street, some of the windows remain blocked up to avoid paying the window tax.

Annan stands on the River Annan—from which it is named—nearly 2 miles (3 km) from its mouth, accessible to vessels of 60 tons as far as Annan Bridge and 300 tons within 1/2 mile (800 m) of the town.

== History ==
Roman remains exist nearby.

The Mote of Annan formed the original home of the de Brus family, later known as the Bruces, lords of Annandale, which most famously produced Robert the Bruce. It was at the Battle of Annan in December 1332 that Bruce supporters overwhelmed Balliol's forces to bring about the end of the first invasion of Scotland in the Second War of Scottish Independence. The Balliols and the Douglases were also more or less closely associated with Annan. Annan Castle once stood in the old churchyard and was originally the church tower.

The Battle of Bruce's Acres was fought near Newbie Castle against the English in the 13th century.

Bruce's Well is a natural spring that lies on the edge of the River Annan just downstream of the Gala Burn and Glen. It is associated with Robert the Bruce as recorded by Historic Environment Scotland.

During the period of the Border lawlessness the inhabitants suffered repeatedly at the hands of moss-troopers and through the feuds of rival families, in addition to the losses caused by the Scottish Wars of Independence. During his retreat from Derby, Bonnie Prince Charlie stayed in the High Street at the inn where Back to the Buck now stands.

With the river embanked, Annan served as a maritime town whose shipyards built many clippers and other boats. A cairn on the jetty commemorates Robert Burns, who worked as an exciseman here in the 1790s. Although the port is now mainly dry, a few stranded boats remain.

The alumni of Annan Academy include Thomas Carlyle and Ashley Jensen.

After the Acts of Union 1707, Annan, Dumfries, Kirkcudbright, Lochmaben and Sanquhar formed the Dumfries district of burghs, returning one member between them to the House of Commons of Great Britain. Annan previously formed a constituency of the Parliament of Scotland and the Convention of Estates.

The population of Annan in the 1841 census was 4,409 inhabitants.

In 1871, the Dumfries Burghs had a population of 3,172 and the royal burgh of Annan had 4,174, governed by a provost and 14 councillors.

A Harbour Trust was established in 1897 to improve the port. The small Newbie Harbour lay on the other side of the River Annan near Newbie Mill and served the old Newbie Castle and barony.

Annan Town Hall was built in Scottish baronial style using the local sandstone and completed in 1878.

By 1901, the population was 5,805, living principally in red sandstone buildings.

The railway turntable in the National Railway Museum, York was manufactured by John Boyd and Co of Annan in 1954. It is the only survivor of a small batch assumed to have been subcontracted from the main turntable manufacturing company, Cowans Sheldon. The design and development of the railway turntable has, on occasion, been erroneously attributed to Annan because of the exhibit in the NRM.

In 2021, the town was affected by heavy rainfall and flooding, resulting in the collapse of two footbridges on the River Annan. The Cuthbertson Memorial Bridge, down from Galabank and in view of the A75 bypass, was completed in 1957 in memory of Surgeon Lieutenant William Cuthbertson who died in the Second World War. Meanwhile, the Diamond Jubilee Bridge, accessible from the Warmanbie road, was much older having been built in 1897 to commemorate Queen Victoria's 60th year on the throne. The local population was devastated by the bridges being swept away as they were symbolic, vital and important for the local community. The nearest crossing of the river is south at Annan Bridge and at the north it is Brydekirk.

== Town colours ==
Annan, along with many other local settlements in the Dumfriesshire region, use the colours black and gold on the town's sports teams. A proposed flag was designed by Philip Tibbetts in 2017, but has yet to be adopted. However, the coat of arms of the town show the Bruce red saltire on gold background combination. Meanwhile, the Riding of the Marches common riding is synonymous with the royal blue and gold pairing.

== Landmarks ==
Just outside the town, the Chapelcross nuclear power station operated from 1959 to 2004 and is being decommissioned. The four cooling towers were demolished in 2007.

The nearby Hoddom Castle was built by John Maxwell, 4th Lord Herries (c. 1552–1565).

To the east of the town lies the settlement of Watchill and the similarly named Watchhall.

Part of the A75 between Annan and Dumfries is reputed to be haunted.

== Religion ==
The 2022 Scottish census found that 55% of the population of Annan identified as having no religion, slightly higher than the national average of 51%. 39% of the town identified as Christian, while less than 1% stated they followed other religions. 5% of the town didn't answer the voluntary question.

=== Christian churches ===
Annan has a number of church buildings, these include:

- Annan Old Parish Church, High Street (Church of Scotland)
- St. Andrew's Parish Church, Bank Street (Church of Scotland)
- Annan URC, Station Road (United Reformed Church)
- St. John's Church, St. John's Road (Scottish Episcopal Church)
- St. Columba's Church, 40 Scotts Street (Catholic Church) Built as a Congregational Church in 1794 became a Catholic church in 1839. Added to in 1904 by Charles Walker of Newcastle as the gift of the parish priest the Rev Canon Lord Archibald Douglas.

There is also a local interchurch group, known as Annandale Churches Together.

== Economy ==
In the 19th century, Annan was connected to the Glasgow & South Western Railway, the Caledonian Railway, and the Solway Junction Railway. It exported cured hams, cattle, sheep, and grain to England; it also produced cotton goods, ropes, ships, and salmon. By the First World War, it was also a center of bacon-curing, distilling, tanning, sandstone quarrying, and nursery-gardening.

Cochran Boilers 1878, Cochran and Co, Annan, Engineers. James Taylor Cochran and Edward Compton started their company Cochran Boilers in Birkenhead, moving to Annan in 1897/ 98. Where it grew to be a major world wide exporter of Cochran Boilers. There in 1998 it celebrated its one hundred years in Scotland. It was Cochran who invented the famous Cochran Vertical Boiler. The boiler was an immediate success. ( the company also produced paddle steamers and two early submarines with novel steam plants ).

Annandale distillery, established in 1836, closed in 1918 and reopened in 2014. It produces a Lowland Malt.

== Media ==
=== Television ===
Local television news programmes that cover the town are:

- BBC Reporting Scotland broadcasting from Glasgow.
- ITV News Lookaround which broadcast from Gateshead.
- BBC Look North can also be received, which broadcast from Newcastle.

=== Radio ===
Radio stations are served by:

- BBC Radio Scotland on 94.7 FM
- BBC Radio Cumbria can also be received on 95.6 FM
- Greatest Hits Radio Dumfries & Galloway on 103.0 FM

=== Newspapers ===
The local newspaper is The Annandale Observer which publishes on Fridays.

== Education ==
- Annan Academy is the town's secondary school that covers the whole of South Annandale.
- Dumfries & Galloway College located in Dumfries is a popular place for further education for students from Annan.

== Transportation ==
Annan Bridge, a stone bridge of three arches, built between 1824 and 1827, carries road traffic over the River Annan. It was designed by Robert Stevenson and built by John Lowry. There is also a railway bridge and a nearby pedestrian bridge over the Annan. It is still served by the Annan railway station, the old Solway Junction Railway station Annan Shawhill having closed to passengers in 1931 and freight in 1955. Newbie Junction Halt railway station briefly served the old Newbie Tile and Brickworks as well as the Cochran's Boiler Works that stood on the short Newbie Branch.

== Outdoor activity ==
Annandale Way is a 53-mile (85 km) walking route that was opened in September 2009. The route runs through Annandale, from the source of the River Annan to the sea; it passes through the town of Annan and offers interesting walking both up river and down from the town.

== Sport ==
- Annan Athletic F.C. represent the town in association football and play at Galabank Stadium. The men’s team are semi-professional and play in the SPFL League One. The club also have a women’s team and various youth teams.
- Annan RFC are the town’s rugby union side who play at Violetbank and have various men’s, women’s and youth teams.
- Annan Town AFC and FC Annan are amateur association football teams that play at Everholm Park in Dumfries' Sunday Amateur Football League.
- Annan Alligators are a swimming club.
- ADAC are an athletics club.
- Annan Pétanque Club were established in 2021.

The town has four defunct association football clubs:

- Annan N.B. Football Club, founded in December 1867, most notably played matches against Kinmount F.C. captained by John Douglas, 9th Marquess of Queensberry.
- Annan Wanderers F.C. (1876–79) played at Hillend. They were members of the Scottish Football Association and participated in the 1878-79 Scottish Cup. They also had a derby versus Annandale Rangers.
- Annan F.C. (1885–95) known previously as “Our Boys” played at the Cricket Field at Greenknowe. In 1894 they moved to a new cricket field at Closehead Park. They club shared a rivalry with a lesser known side from the town called Solway Rovers.
- Solway Star F.C. were a Scottish Football League team that played at Summergate before moving to Kimmeter Park Green and then Mafeking Park. They were active from 1911-1947.

== Notable people ==
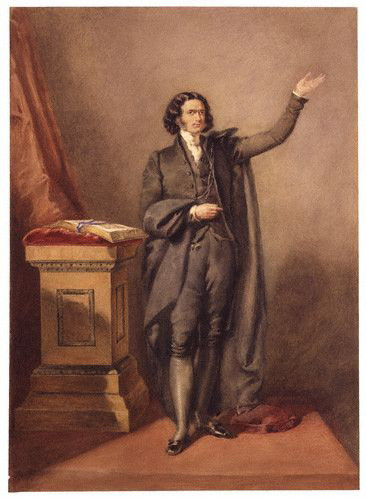
Edward Irving, ca.1823

- Thomas Blacklock (1721–1791), Scottish poet.
- Hugh Clapperton (1788–1827), a Scottish naval officer and explorer of West and Central Africa.
- Thomas Carlyle (1795–1881) a British essayist, historian, and philosopher.
- David Gow (born 1957), engineer, invented the i-Limb prosthetic hand
- Edward Irving (1792–1834), a Scottish clergyman, statue of him in the grounds of Annan Old Parish Church.
- Ashley Jensen (born 1969), actress, best known for her roles in Extras and Ugly Betty.
- George Johnston (1764–1823), Leader of the New South Wales rum rebellion, briefly Lieutenant-Governor
- James Johnstone (physician) (1730?–1802), medical doctor and scholar
- William Ewart Lockhart (1846–1900), artist, in both oil and water-colour
- Robert Murray M'Cheyne (1813–1843), preacher, ordained by the Annan Presbytery.
- David Payne (1843–1894), landscape artist.
- Jim Wallace (born 1954), MP for Orkney and Shetland 1983-2001; MSP for Orkney 1999-2007 and the Deputy First Minister of Scotland 1999-2005, born in Annan.
- Jack Wright (1850–1929), coursing enthusiast, who lived at Watchhall, father of Hardy Wright.

=== Sport ===
- Andy Aitken (born 1978), professional footballer best known for his long service with Queen of the South F.C.
- Cameron Bell (born 1986), ex-footballer who played for Kilmarnock F.C., Rangers F.C. and Scotland national football team among others.
- David Leslie (1953–2008), racing driver
- Hardy Wright (1893–1974), greyhound trainer who lived initially at Watchhall, first brought the Barbican Cup (coursing) to Scotland

== Gallery ==
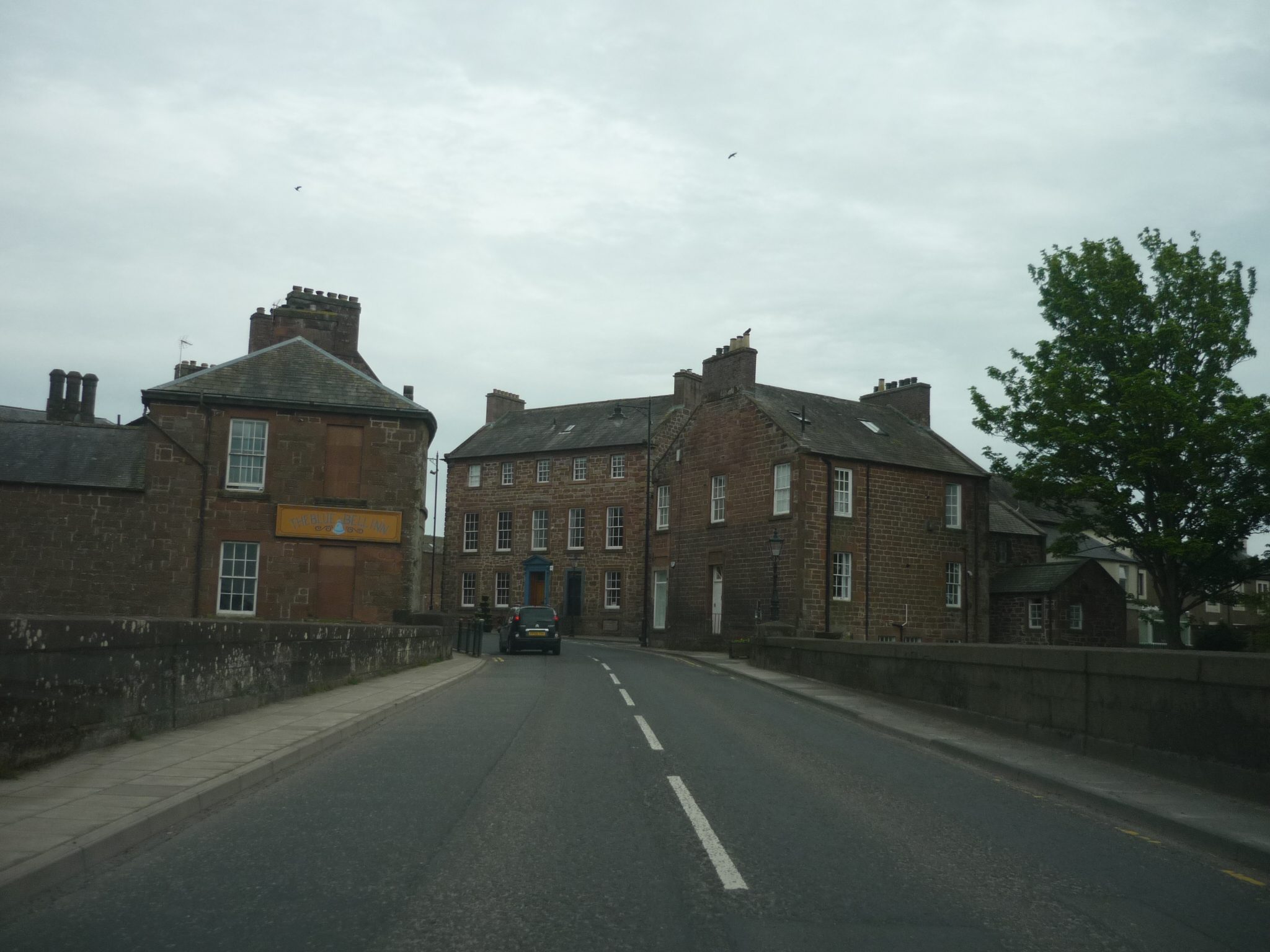
Annan Bridge entrance to the west into Annan (2018)

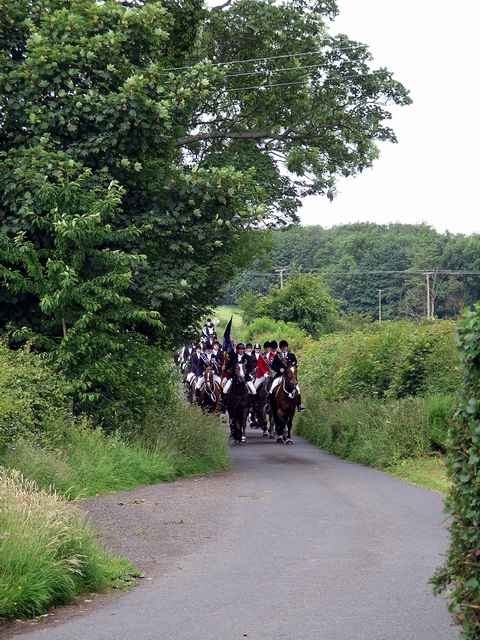
The Riding of the Marches, Annan, dating back to 13th century.

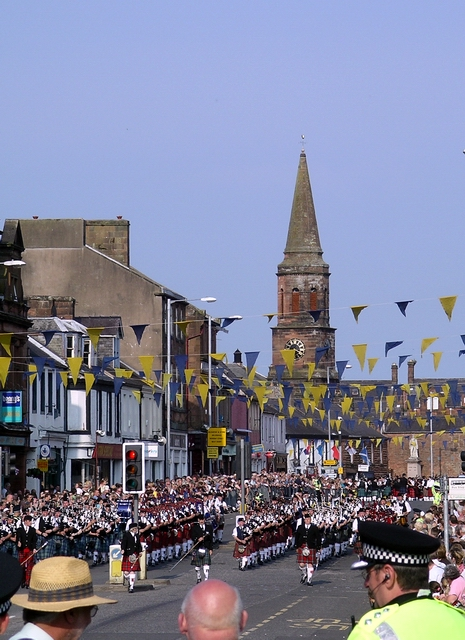
Annan

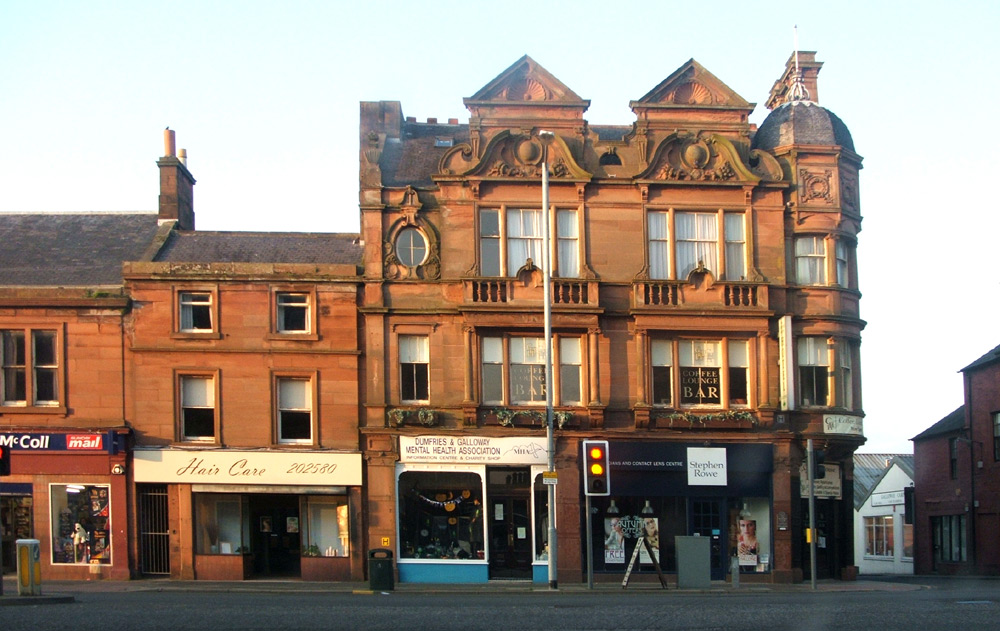
High Street

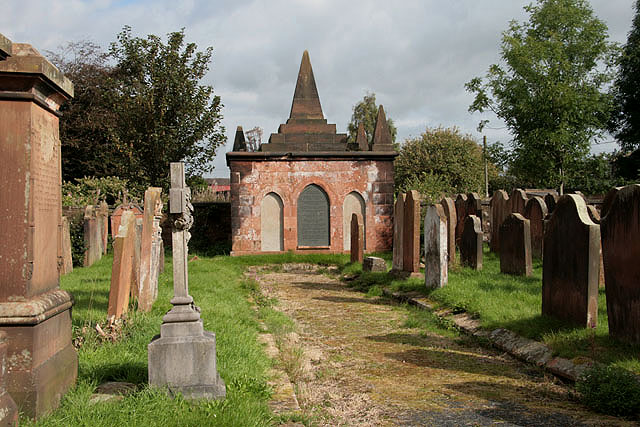
Annan Old Parish Churchyard

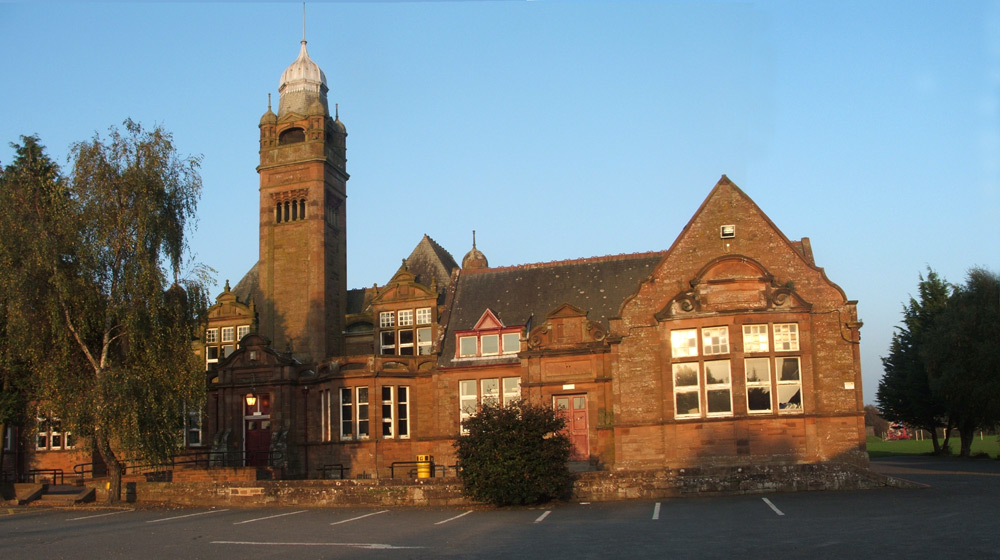
Annan Academy (old buildings)

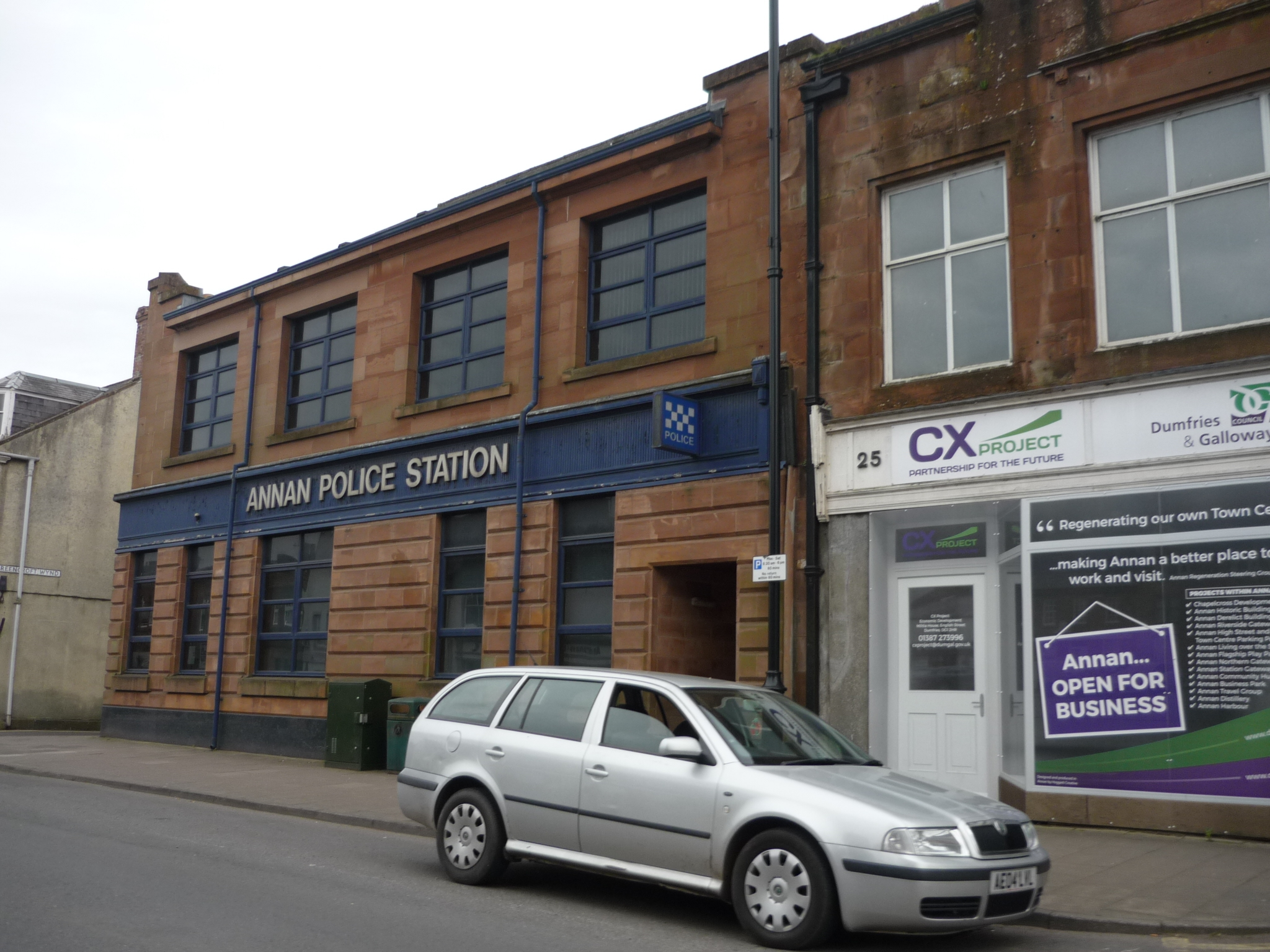
Police station (2018)

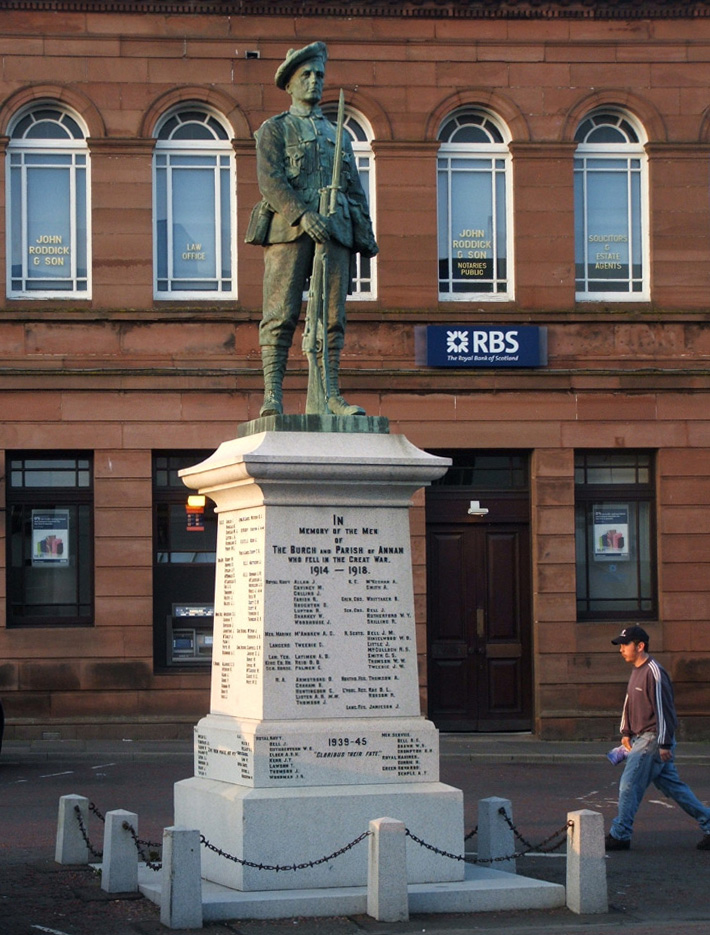
War memorial, High Street

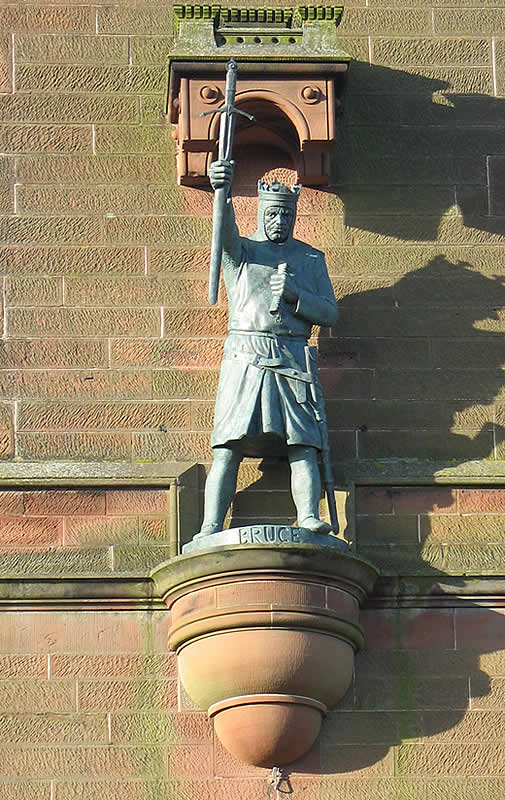
Bruce statue, Town hall

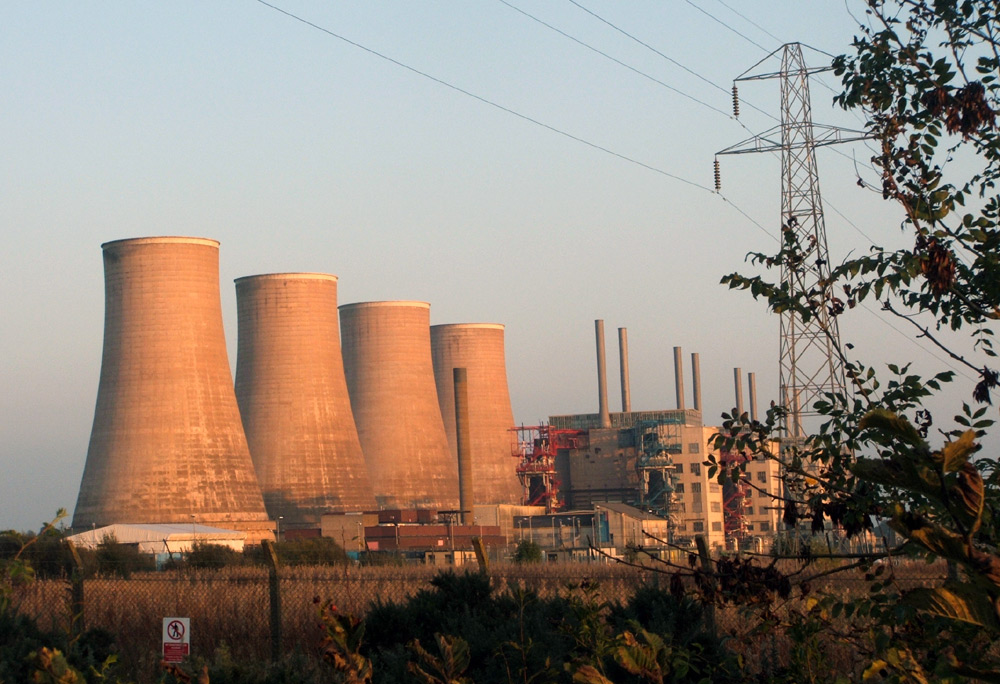
Chapelcross power station (cooling towers now demolished)

== See also ==
- List of places in Dumfries and Galloway
- Annan (surname)
