= Dumfriesshire =

Coordinates: 55°10′N 3°30′W

- Historic county
- Country: Scotland
- County town: Dumfries

Area
  - Total: 1,063 sq mi (2,753 km^{2})
- Ranked 8th of 34
- Chapman code: DFS

Dumfriesshire /dʊmˈfriːs.ʃiːr/, alternately the County of Dumfries or Shire of Dumfries (Scottish Gaelic: Siorrachd Dhùn Phris), is a historic county and registration county in southern Scotland. The Dumfries lieutenancy area covers a similar area to the historic county.

In terms of historic counties it borders Kirkcudbrightshire to the west, Ayrshire to the north-west, Lanarkshire, Peeblesshire and Selkirkshire to the north, and Roxburghshire to the east. To the south is the coast of the Solway Firth, and on the other side of the border between Scotland and England the English county of Cumberland.

Dumfriesshire has three traditional subdivisions, based on the three main valleys in the county: Annandale, Eskdale and Nithsdale. These had been independent provinces in medieval times but were gradually superseded as administrative areas by the area controlled by the sheriff of Dumfries, or Dumfriesshire. A Dumfriesshire County Council existed from 1890 until 1975.

Since 1975, the area of the historic county has formed part of the Dumfries and Galloway council area for local government purposes.

== Geography ==
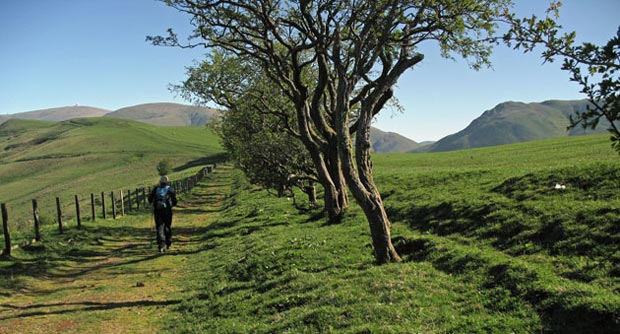
The Lowther Hills

The coastline measures 21 miles (34 km). The county slopes very gradually from the mountainous districts of the Southern Uplands in the north, down to the sea; lofty hills alternating in parts with stretches of tableland or rich fertile holms. At various points within a few miles of the Solway are tracts of moss land, like Craigs Moss, Lochar Moss and Longbridge Moor in the west, and Nutberry Moss in the east, all once under water, but since largely reclaimed.

The principal mountains occur near the northern boundaries, the highest being White Coomb (2,695 ft or 821 m), Hart Fell (2,651 ft or 808 m), Saddle Yoke (2,412 ft or 735 m), Swatte Fell (2,389 ft or 728 m), Lowther Hills (2,377 ft or 725 m), Queensbury (2,285 ft or 696 m) and Ettrick Pen (2,269 ft or 692 m).

The three longest rivers are the River Nith, the River Annan and the River Esk, the basins of which form the great dales by which the county is cloven from north to south — Nithsdale, Annandale and Eskdale. From the point where it enters Dumfriesshire, 16 mi (26 km) from its source near Enoch Hill in Ayrshire, the course of the Nith is mainly south-easterly until it enters the Solway, a few miles below Dumfries. Its total length is 65 mi., and its chief affluents are, on the right, the Kello Water, Euchan Water, Scaur Water, Cluden Water and River Cargen, Cargen, and — on the left — the River Crawick, Carron Water and River Campie.

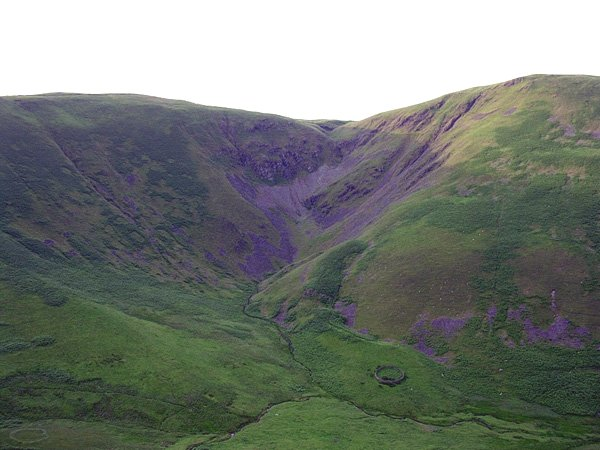
The Devil's Beef Tub near Moffat

The Annan rises near the Devil's Beef Tub, a remarkable chasm in the far north, and after flowing about 40 miles (64 km), mainly in a southerly course, it enters the Solway at Barnkirk Headlands and bays. It receives, on the right, the Kinnel Water (reinforced by the Water of Ae), and — on the left — the Moffat Water, the Dryfe Water and the Water of Milk.

From the confluence of the White Esk (rising near Ettrick Pen) and the Black Esk (rising near Jocks Shoulder, 1,754 ft or 535 m) the Esk flows in a gradually south-easterly direction until it crosses the Border, whence it sweeps to the southwest through the extreme north-western territory of Cumberland and falls into the Solway. Of its total course of 42 miles (68 km), 12 miles (19 km) belong to the White Esk, 20 miles (32 km) are of the Esk proper on Scottish soil and 10 miles (16 km) are of the stream in its English course. On the right the Wauchope Water is the chief affluent, and on the left it receives the Meggat Water, Ewes Water, Tarras Water, Liddel Water and River Lyne — the last being an English tributary, and the previous forming the border between Roxburghshire and Cumberland.

Other rivers are the Lochar Water (18 mi or 29 km), the Kirtle Water (17 mi or 27 km) and the River Sark (12 mi or 19 km), all flowing into the Solway. For 1 mile (1.6 km) of its course the Esk, and for 7 mi (11 km) of its course the River Sark, form the boundaries between Dumfriesshire and Cumberland. Between the Esk and Sark lies Scots' Dyke, a man-made berm that forms the Anglo-Scottish border, cutting through the area formerly known as the Debatable Lands.

Loch Skeen in the north (1,750 feet (530 m) above the sea) and the group of lochs around Lochmaben, are the principal lakes. There are few glens so named in the shire, but the passes of Dalveen, Enterkin and Menock, leading up from Nithsdale to the Lowther and other hills, yield to few glens in Scotland in the wild grandeur of their scenery. For part of the way Enterkin Pass runs between mountains rising sheer from the burn to a height of nearly 2,000 ft (610 m) Loch Skene finds an outlet in Tail Burn, the water of which at a short distance from the lake leaps from a height of 200 ft (61 m) in a fine waterfall, known as the Grey Mare's Tail. A much smaller but picturesque fall of the same name, also known as Crichope Linn, occurs on the Crichope near Thornhill. Mineral waters are found at Moffat, Hartfell Spa, some 3 miles (4.8 km) farther north, Closeburn and Brow on the Solway.

== Geology ==
The greater portion of the county of Dumfries belongs to the Silurian tableland of the south of Scotland which contains representatives of all the divisions of that system from the Arenig to the Ludlow rocks.

By far the largest area is occupied by strata of Tarannon and Llandovery age which cover a belt of country from 20 to 25 mi (32 to 40 km) across from Drumlanrig Castle in the north to Torthorwald in the south. Consisting of massive grits, sometimes conglomeratic, greywackes, flags and shales, these beds are repeated by innumerable folds frequently inverted, striking northeast and southwest and usually dipping towards the northwest. In the midst of this belt there are lenticular bands of older strata of Arenig, Llandeilo, Caradoc and Llandovery age composed of fine sediments such as cherts, black and grey shales, white clays and flags, which come to the surface along anticlinal folds and yield abundant graptolites characteristic of these divisions.

These black shale bands are typically developed in Moffatdale; indeed the three typical sections chosen by Charles Lapworth to illustrate his three great groups:

(1) the Glenkill shales (Upper Llandeilo),
(2) the Hartfell shales (Caradoc),
(3) Birkhill shales (Lower Llandovery) occur respectively in the Glenkill Burn north of Kirkmichael, on Hartfell and in Dobbs Linn near St Mary's Loch in the basin of the river Annan.

In the extreme northwest of the county between Drumlanrig Castle and Dalveen Pass in the south and the Spango and Kello Waters on the north, there is a broad development of Arenig, Liandeilo and Caradoc strata, represented by Radiolarian cherts, black shales, grits, conglomerates, greywackes and shales which rise from underneath the central Tarannon belt and are repeated by innumerable folds, in the cores of the arches of Arenig cherts there are diabase lavas, tuffs and agglomerates which are typically represented on Bail Hill east of Kirkconnel. Along the southern margin of the Tarannon belt, the Wenlock and Ludlow rocks follow in normal order, the boundary between the two being defined by a line extending from the head of the Ewes Water in Eskdale, southwest by Lockerbie to Mouswald. These consist of greywackes, flags and shales with bands of dark graptolite shales, the finer sediments being often well ground. They are likewise repeated by inverted folds, the axial planes being usually inclined to the southeast. The Silurian tableland in the northwest of the county is pierced by intrusive igneous rocks in the form of dikes and bosses, which are regarded as of Lower Old Red Sandstone age. Of these, the granite mass of Spango Water, northeast of Kirkconnel, is an excellent example. Along the northwest margin of the county, on the north side of the fault bounding the Silurian tableland, the Lower Old Red Sandstone occurs, where it consists of sandstones and conglomerates associated with contemporaneous volcanic rocks. The Upper Old Red Sandstone forms a narrow strip on the south side of the Silurian tableland, resting uncomfortably on the Silurian rocks and passing upwards into the Carboniferous formation. It stretches from the county boundary east of the Ewes Water, southwest by Langholm to Birrenswark. Along this line these Upper Red sandstones and shales are overlaid by a thin zone of volcanic rocks which point to contemporaneous volcanic action in this region at the beginning of the Carboniferous period. Some of the vents from which these igneous materials may have been discharged are found along the watershed between Liddesdale and Teviotdale in Roxburghshire.

The strata of Carboniferous age are found in three areas:

(1) between Sanquhar and Kirkconnel,
(2) at Closeburn near Thornhill,
(3) in the district between Liddesdale and Ruthwell.

In the first two instances (Sanquhar and Thornhill) the Carboniferous sediments lie in hollows worn out of the old Silurian tableland. In the Sanquhar basin the strata belong to the Coal Measures, and include several valuable coal-seams which are probably the southern prolongations of the members of this division in Ayrshire. At the S.E. limit of the Sanquhar Coalfield there are patches of the Carboniferous Limestone series, but towards the N. these are overlapped by the Coal Measures which thus rest directly on the Silurian platform. At Closeburn and Barjarg there are beds of marine limestone, associated with sandstones and shales which probably represent marine bands in the Carboniferous Limestone series.

The most important development of Carboniferous strata occurs between Liddesdale and Ruthwell. In the valleys of the Liddel and the Esk the following zones are represented, which are given in ascending order:

(1) The Whita Sandstone,
(2) the Cementstone group,
(3) the Fell Sandstone,
(4) the Glencartholm Volcanic Group,
(5) Marine limestone group with Coal-seams,
(6) Millstone Grit,
(7) Rowanburn coal group,
(8) Byreburn coal group,
(9) Red Sandstones of Canonbie yielding plants characteristic of the Upper Coal Measures.

The coal seams of the Rowanburn field have been chiefly wrought, and in view of their exhaustion bores have been sunk to prove the coals beneath the red sandstone of upper Carboniferous age. From a palaeontological point of view the Glencartholm volcanic zone is of special interest, as the calcareous shale associated with the tuffs has yielded a large number of new species of fishes, decapod crustaceans, phyllopods and scorpions. The Triassic rocks rest uncomfortably on all older formations within the county. In the tract along the Solway Firth they repose on the folded and eroded edges of the Carboniferous strata, and when traced westwards to the Dumfries basin they rest directly on the Silurian platform. They occur in five areas:

(1) between Annan and the mouth of the Esk (the Scottish portion of the Solway Basin),
(2) the Dumfries basin (Lower Nithsdale),
(3) the Thornhill basin (Middle Nithsdale),
(4) the Lochmaben basin (Middle Annandale),
(5) Upper Annandale.

The strata consist of breccia, false-bedded sandstones and mans, the sandstones being extensively quarried for building purposes. In the sandstones of Corncockle Moor reptilian footprints have been obtained. In the Thornhill basin there is a thin zone of volcanic rocks at the base of this series which are evidently on-the horizon of the lavas beneath the Mauchline sandstones in Ayrshire. In the Sanquhar basin there are small outliers of lavas probably of this age and several vents filled with agglomerate from which these igneous materials in the Thornhill basin may have been derived. There are several striking examples of basalt dikes of Tertiary age, one having been traced from the Lead Hills south-east by Moffat, across Eskdalemuir to the English border.

== Climate and industries ==
The climate is mild, with a mean annual temperature of around 9 °C (48 °F) (January, 3.6 °C (38.5 °F); July, 15.3 °C (59.5 °F)), and the average annual rainfall is 53 in. Towards the middle of the 18th century farmers began to raise stock for the south, and a hundred years later 20,000 head of heavy cattle were sent yearly to the English markets. The Galloways, which were the breed in vogue at first, have been to a large extent replaced by shorthorns and Ayrshire dairy cattle. Sheep breeding, of later origin, has attained to remarkable dimensions, the walks in the higher hilly country being given over to Cheviots, and the richer pasture of the low-lying farms being reserved for half-bred lambs, a cross of Cheviots and Leicesters or other long-woolled rams. Pig-feeding, once important, has declined before the imports of bacon from foreign countries. Horse breeding is pursued on a considerable scale. Grain crops, of which oats are the principal, show a downward tendency. Arable farms range from 100–300 acres (0.40–1.21 km^{2}), and pastoral from 300–3,000 acres (1.2–12.1 km^{2}).

In general the industries are only of local importance and mostly confined to Dumfries and a few of the larger towns. Langholm is famous for its tweeds; breweries and distilleries are found at Annan, Sanquhar and elsewhere; some shipping is carried on at Annan and Dumfries; and the salmon fisheries of the Nith and Annan and the Solway Firth are of value.

== Communications ==
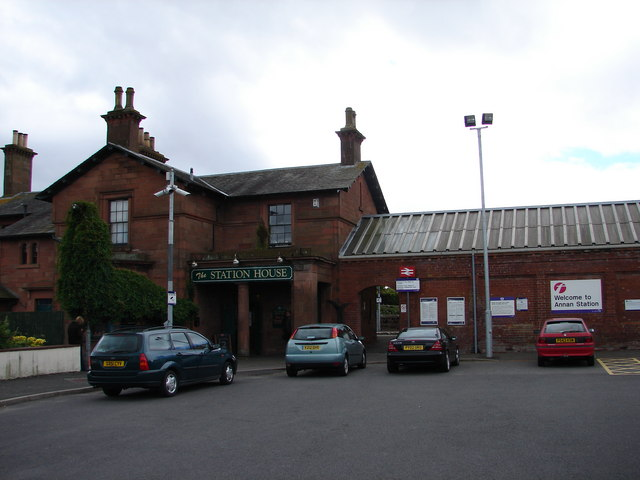
Annan railway station, built in 1848

As built, the Glasgow and South Western Railway from Glasgow to Carlisle runs through Nithsdale to Dumfries, practically following the course of the River Nith, then on to Annan and lower Annandale to the English border at Gretna. A branch was built from Dumfries to Moniaive, the Cairn Valley Light Railway, but this closed in 1949.

The Caledonian Railway from Carlisle to Glasgow runs through Annandale, which threw off at Beattock a small branch to Moffat, now closed. At Lockerbie a cross-country line to Dumfries (now closed), and at Kirtlebridge a line that ultimately crossed the Solway to Bowness which is also closed.

From Dumfries westwards there were rail communications on the 'Port Road' to Castle Douglas, Newton Stewart, Stranraer and Portpatrick, with branches to Kirkcudbright and Wigtown all closed and lifted.

The North British Railway's Waverley route, to Edinburgh from Carlisle was closed in the 1960s. There are vague plans to reopen this line to Carlisle as a continuation of the new rail link from Edinburgh to Tweedbank opened in 2015. Until 1967 the North British Railway sent a short line to Langholm (via Canonbie and Gilnockie) from Riddings Junction in Cumberland, giving access to Carlisle. The last passenger train ran on the Langholm branch on 26 March 1967, the last freight service on 17 September in the same year, and the track was lifted shortly thereafter.

There is also an extensive local bus and coach network throughout the county, centred on Dumfries.

There are no commercial airports in the county.

== Settlements ==
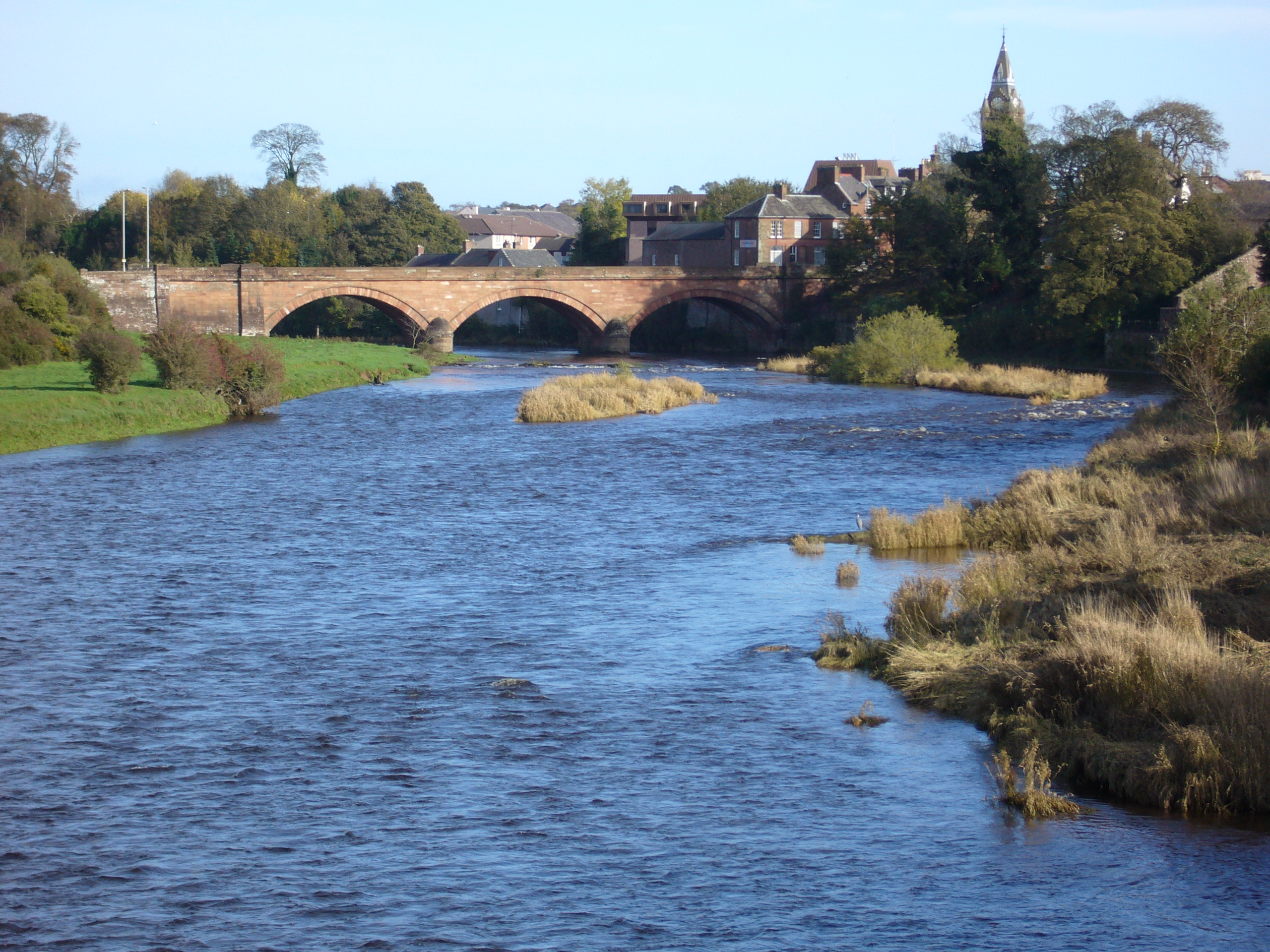
Annan

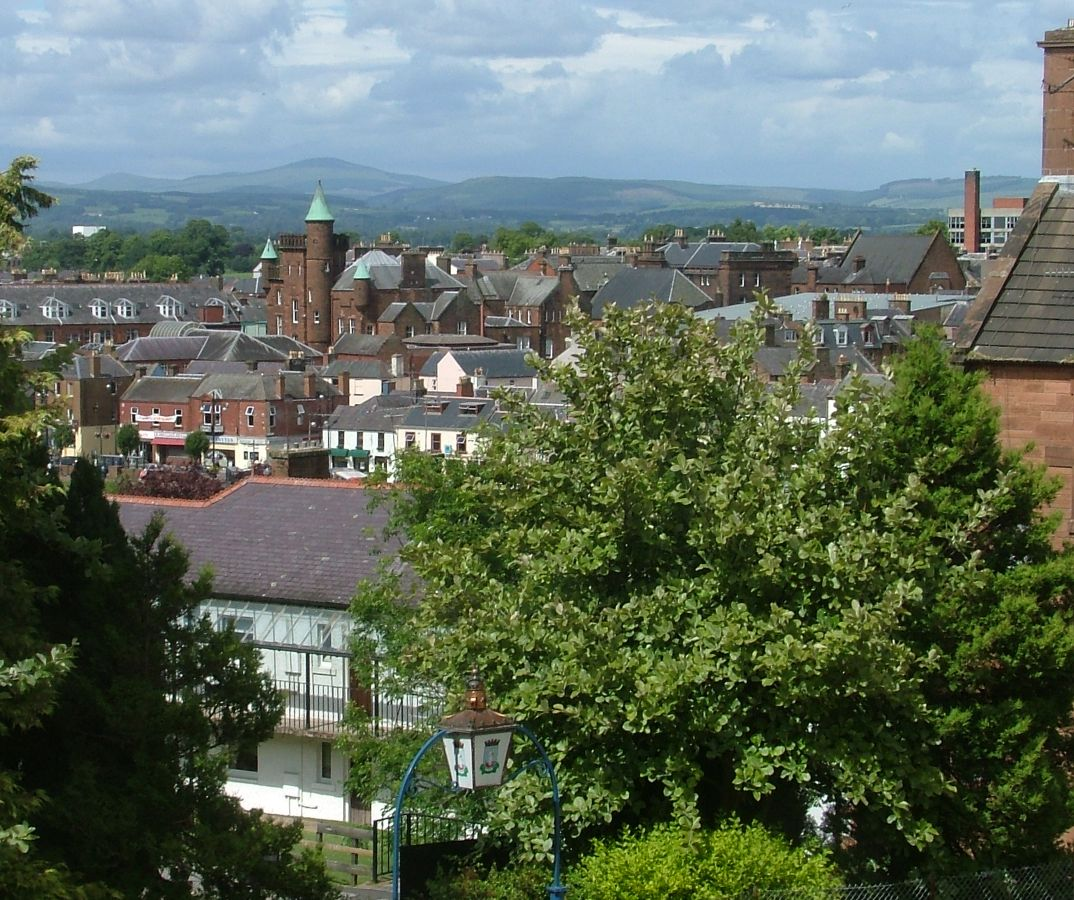
Dumfries

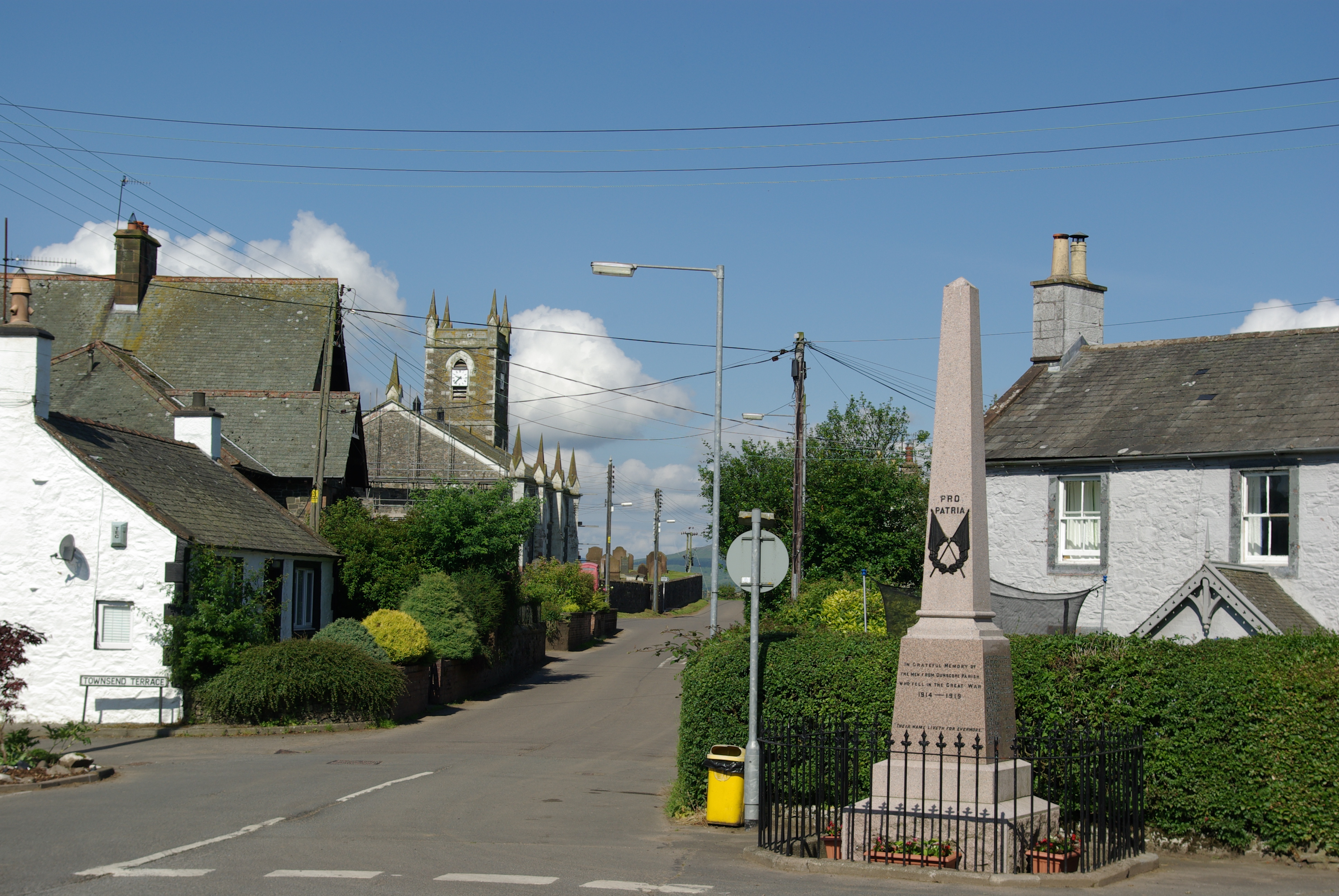
Dunscore

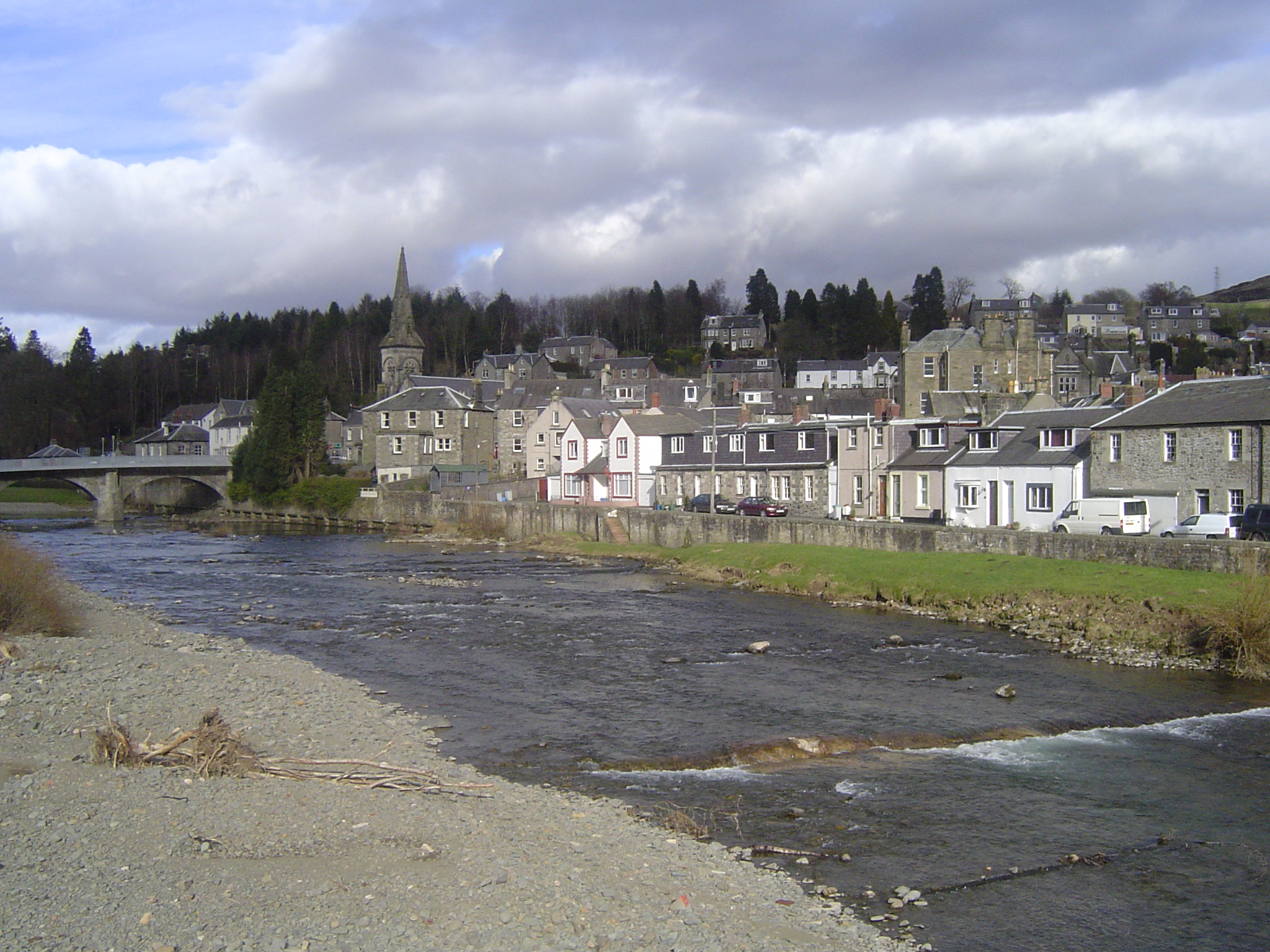
Langholm

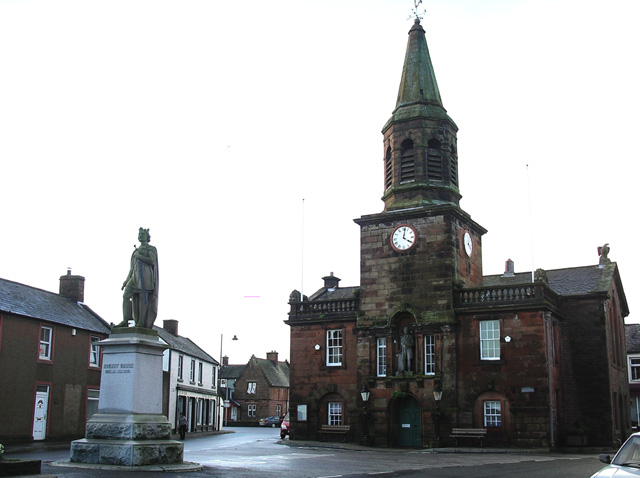
Lochmaben

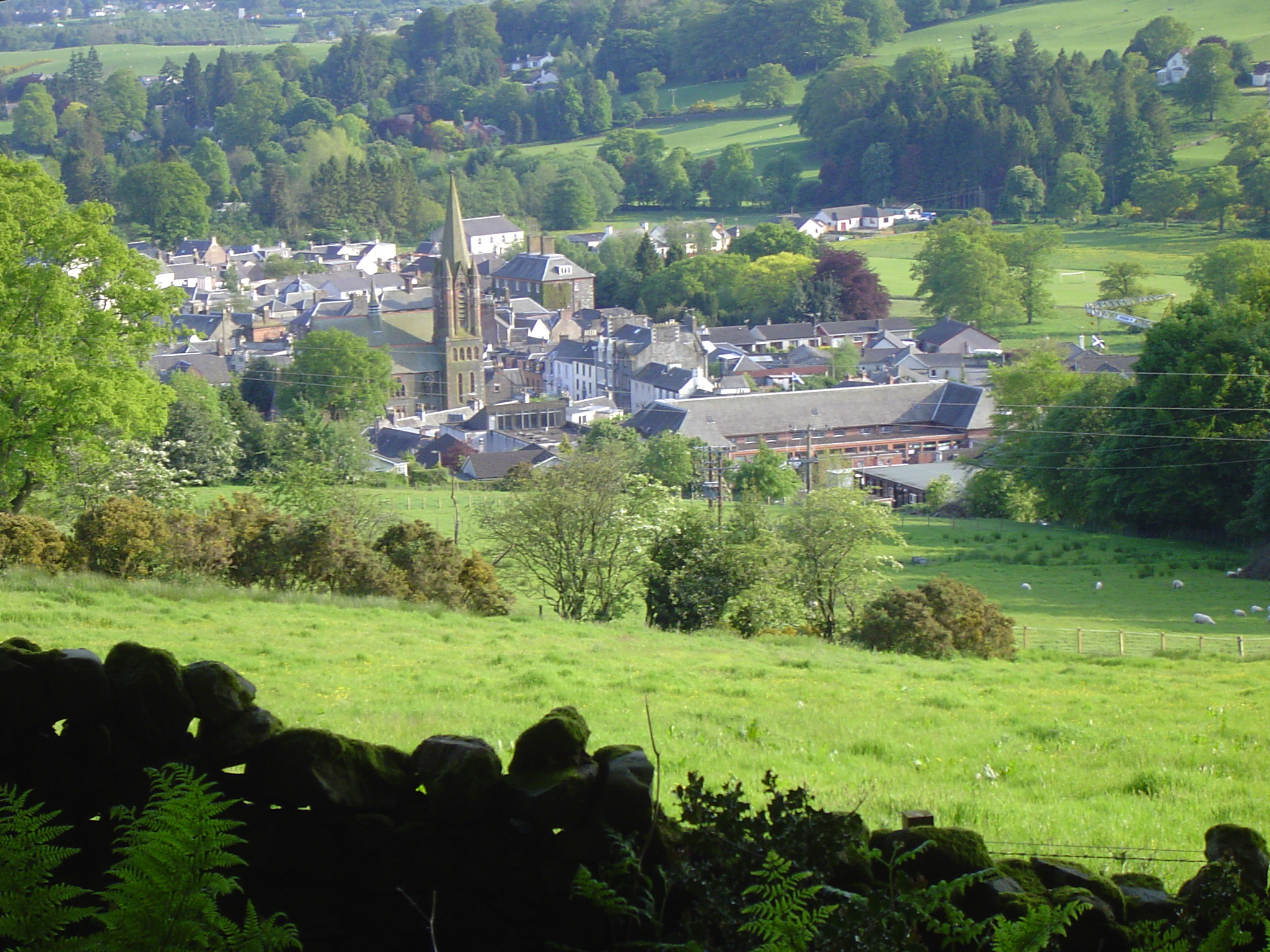
Moffat

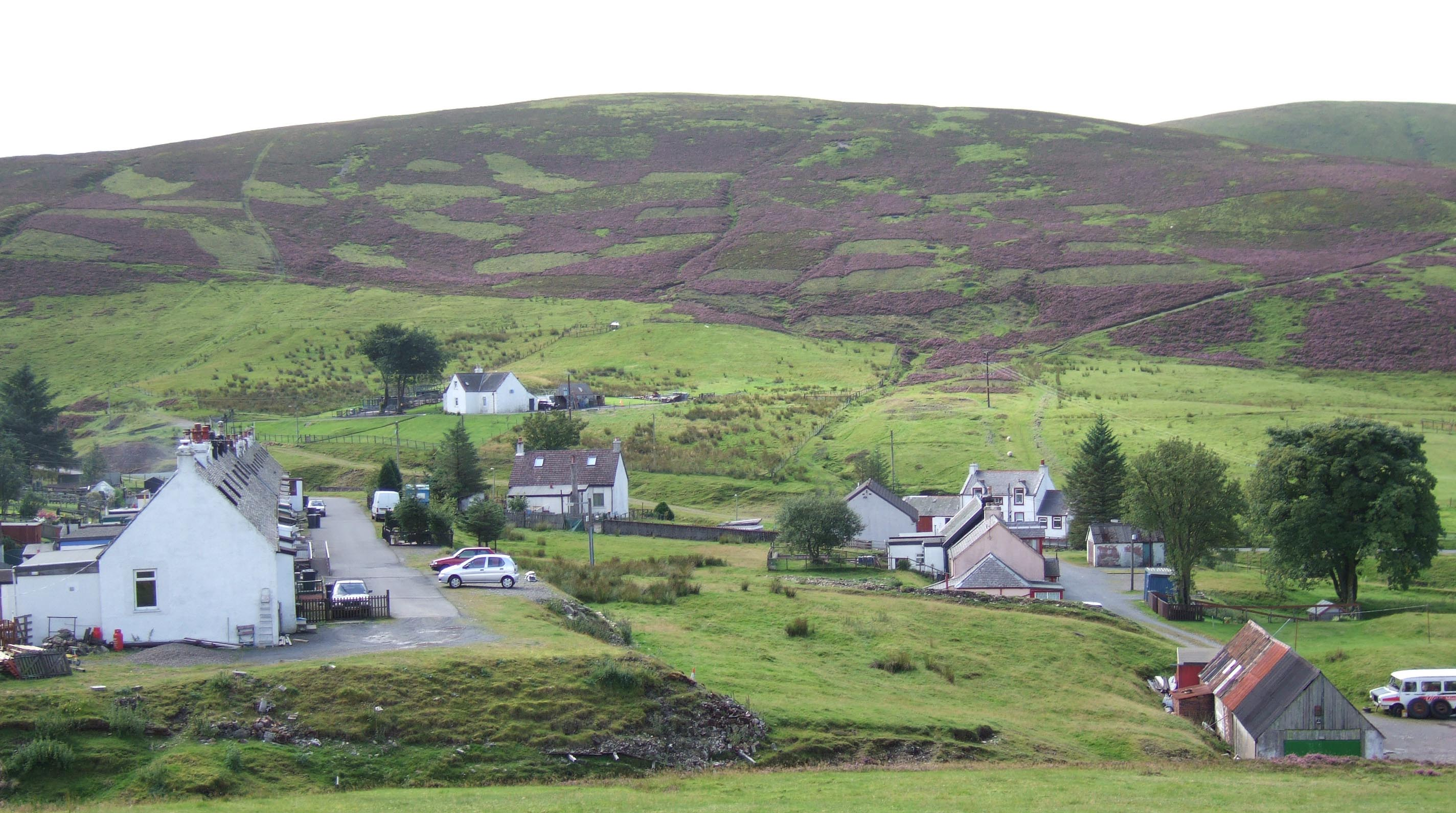
Wanlockhead

- Annan
- Applegarthtown
- Arkleton
- Beattock
- Bentpath
- Boreland
- Burnfoot
- Burnhead
- Caerlaverock
- Canonbie
- Carronbridge
- Claygate
- Closeburn
- Collin
- Cummertrees
- Dalton
- Dornock
- Dryfesdale
- Dumfries
- Dunscore
- Durisdeer
- Eaglesfield
- Eastriggs
- Ecclefechan
- Eskdalemuir
- Glencairn
- Gretna
- Gretna Green
- Half Morton
- Harelaw
- Hoddom
- Holywood
- Johnstonebridge
- Keir
- Kelloholm
- Kirkconnel
- Kirkmahoe
- Kirkpatrick-Fleming
- Kirkpatrick Juxta
- Kirkstyle
- Kirtlebridge
- Langholm
- Locharbriggs
- Lochmaben
- Lockerbie
- Mennock
- Middlebie
- Moffat
- Mouswald
- Newbie
- Newton Wamphray
- Penpont
- Powfoot
- Rigg
- Rowanburn
- Ruthwell
- Sanquhar
- Thornhill
- Tinwald
- Torthorwald
- Tundergarth
- Tynron
- Wanlockhead
- Waterbeck
- Westerkirk

== History ==
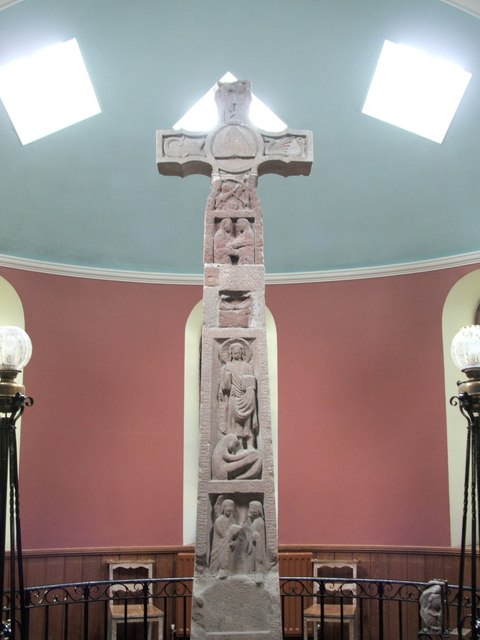
The Ruthwell Cross

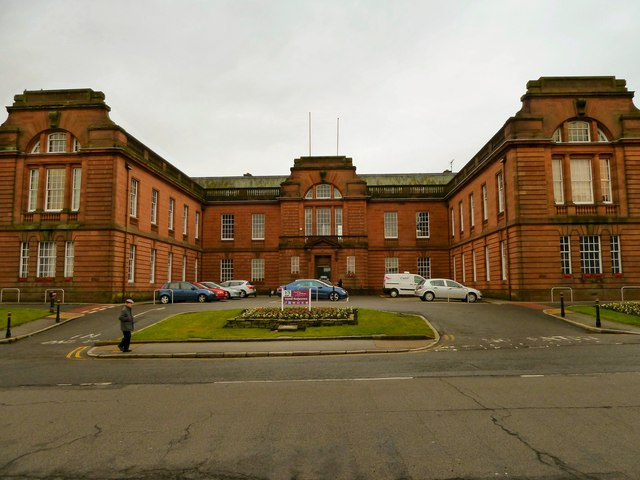
County Buildings, the former headquarters of Dumfriesshire County Council, and since 1975 the headquarters of Dumfries and Galloway Council.

Archaeological remains from the Neolithic and Bronze Age include stone circles (as in Dunscore and Eskdalemuir), tumuli and cairns (Closeburn), and sculptured stones (Dornock). A number of bank barrows and cursus have recently been discovered.

The Brittonic tribe which inhabited this part of Scotland was called by the Romans Selgovae. They have left many signs of their presence, such as hill forts and camps (Dryfesdale). The country around Moffat especially is rich in remains.

There are traces of the Roman roads which ran by Dalveen Pass into Clydesdale and up the Annan to Tweeddale, and the ruins of Blatobulgium at Birrens is one of the best-preserved examples of a Roman camp. Roman altars, urns, and coins are found in many places.

After the withdrawal of Roman power from Britain, the situation in Dumfries is not clear. The lands of the Selgovae were incorporated into the larger Brittonic-speaking kingdom of Strathclyde but over time came under pressure, by Gaels from Ireland, Angles from Northumbria and Vikings from Scandinavia. There is little writing preserved from this time, and that which remains is ecclesiastical in nature. Archaeology, although rich on the ground, has rarely been investigated, and place names, used as an indication of influence, are still argued over by academics.

In the parish church of Ruthwell (pronounced "Rivvel": the rood, or cross, well) is preserved an ancient Anglo-Saxon cross which tells in runic characters the story of the Crucifixion. The conquest of Dumfriesshire by Angles does not seem to have been thorough in the West, where Gaelic-speaking invaders held sway, the people of Nithsdale and elsewhere maintaining some Celtic institutions up to the time of David I, although this is not certain. Around 50 fragments of gilt bronze mounts found in Dumfriesshire and now at the National Museum of Scotland were probably originally attached to a portable wooden cross, c. 750 – c. 800AD.

As a Border county, Dumfriesshire was the scene of stirring deeds at various epochs, especially in the days of Robert Bruce. Edward I besieged Caerlaverock Castle, and the factions of Bruce (who was lord of Annandale), John Comyn and John Baliol were at constant feud. The Border clans were always at strife. There is record of a bloody fight in Dryfesdale in 1593, when the Johnstones slew 700 Maxwells, and, overtaking the fugitives at Lockerbie, there massacred most of the remnant. These factions embroiled the dalesmen until the 18th century. The uplands of the shire afforded retreat to the persecuted Covenanters, who, at Sanquhar, published in 1680 their declaration against the king, anticipating the principles of the glorious Revolution by several years. Prince Charles Edward’s ambition left the shire comparatively untouched, for the Jacobite sentiment made little appeal to the people.

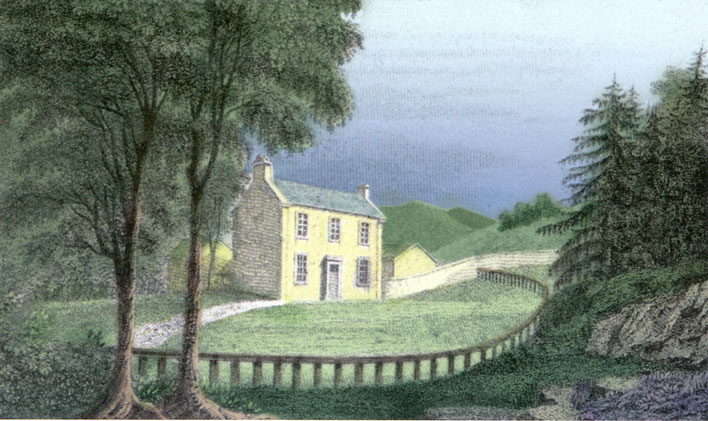
Craigenputtock House 1829

Dumfriesshire is inseparably connected with the name of Robert Burns, who farmed at Ellisland Farm on the Nith for three years, and spent the last five years of his life in Dumfries. Thomas Carlyle was born at Ecclefechan, in a house still standing, and was buried beside his parents in the kirkyard of the old Secession church (now the United Free). His farm of Craigenputtock was left to Edinburgh University in order to found the John Welsh bursaries in classics and mathematics.

Folk history suggests that at Holywood, near Dumfries, there stand the relic of the grove of sacred oaks from which the place derived its name, and a stone circle known locally as the Twelve Apostles.

In 1988 Dumfriesshire was the site of the Lockerbie bombing, in which a bomb exploded on an aircraft flying over the town of Lockerbie, killing a total of 270 people. It remains the worst single terrorist attack in British history.

=== Administrative history ===
The origins of Dumfriesshire as a county or shire are obscure. There was certainly a shire of Dumfries by 1305, with some suggestion that it had existed from the twelfth century. Annandale and Eskdale retained a degree of independence from the sheriff of Dumfries, leaving the sheriff's practical control focussed on the Nithsdale area until 1747 when the separate jurisdictions of Annandale and Eskdale were ended under the Heritable Jurisdictions (Scotland) Act 1746.

Commissioners of Supply were created in 1667 for each shire, and formed the main administrative body for the area until county councils were created in 1890 under the Local Government (Scotland) Act 1889. The 1889 act also led to a review of boundaries of many of Scotland's counties; in the case of Dumfriesshire the two parishes of Moffat and Kirkpatrick-Juxta, which had previously both straddled Dumfriesshire and Lanarkshire, were brought entirely within Dumfriesshire. Dumfriesshire County Council was based at County Buildings on English Street in Dumfries. In May 1975 the county council was abolished and its functions were transferred to Dumfries and Galloway Regional Council under the Local Government (Scotland) Act 1973. Two lower-tier district councils were created from parts of Dumfriesshire, being Annandale and Eskdale covering the east of the county and Nithsdale covering the west of the county and a small part of neighbouring Kirkcudbrightshire.

For lieutenancy purposes, the last lord-lieutenant of the county of Dumfriesshire was made lord-lieutenant for the combined area of the Nithsdale and Annandale and Eskdale districts when the reforms came into effect in 1975. The districts were abolished in 1996, with their functions passing to Dumfries and Galloway Council. The Dumfries lieutenancy area continues to cover the combined area of the pre-1996 Nithsdale and Annandale and Eskdale districts.

== Historical population figures ==
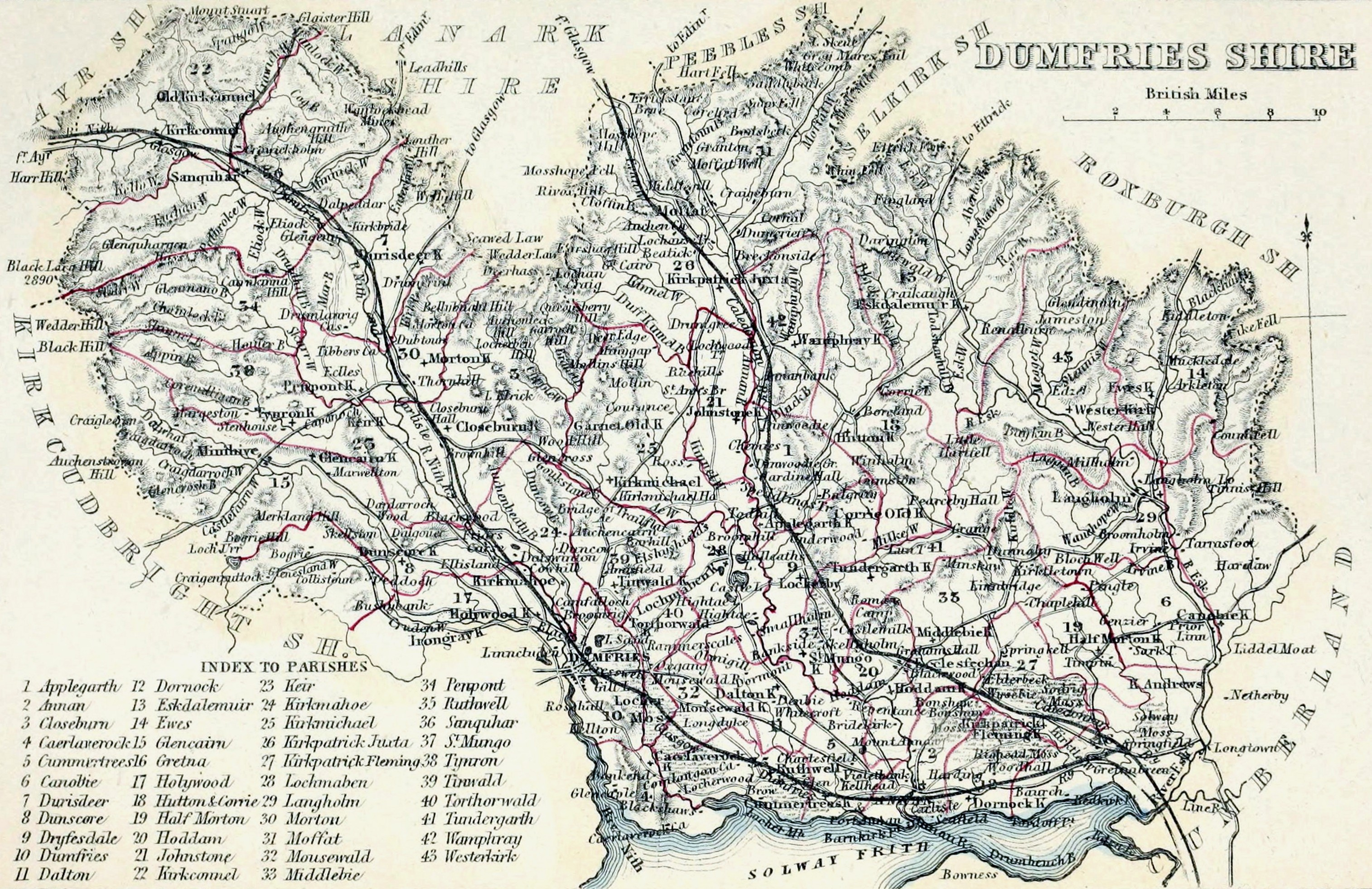
Dumfriesshire Civil Parish map. Published 1854. https://archive.org/stream/imperialgazettee01wils#page/n542/mode/1up Boundaries outlined in red

At the time of the 1841 census the population was 72,830 inhabitants. The population in 1891 was 74,245, and in 1901, 72,371, when there were 176 persons who spoke Gaelic and English.

Of the chief towns:

- Annan (pop. in 1901, 4,309 pop. in 1951 4,631, in 2001 8,389),
- Dumfries (pop. in 1901, 14,440, pop. in 1951 26,322, in 2001 37,846),
- Langholm (pop. in 1901, 3,142, pop. in 1951 2,404, in 2001 2,311),
- Lockerbie (pop. in 1901, 2,358, pop. in 1951 2,621, in 2001 4,009),
- Moffat (pop. in 1901, 2,530, pop. in 1951 2,114).

== Places of interest ==
- Caerlaverock Castle
- Dumfries Museum
- Sweetheart Abbey

== Outdoor activities ==
There are three of the world class 7Stanes mountain biking centres in Dumfriesshire at Dalbeattie, Mabie and Ae. The Sustrans Route 7 long-distance cycle route also runs through the Dumfriesshire. There is excellent hill walking in the Moffat Hills. The Southern Upland Way coast to coast walk passes through Dumfriesshire and the 53 mi (85 km) long Annandale Way travels from the Solway Firth into the Moffat hills near the Devil's Beef Tub. There is also sailing on Castle Loch at Lochmaben.

== People ==
Notable people from Dumfriesshire include:

- James Burnie Beck, US Representative and US Senator from Kentucky
- John Graham (botanist)
- Thomas Carlyle, essayist
- Henry Duncan, clergyman
- Andy Goldsworthy, sculptor
- Sir Andrew Halliday, physician, reformer, writer, and civil servant
- William Jardine, Jardine Matheson founder
- Kirkpatrick Macmillan, inventor of the bicycle
- James MacMurdo, first British political agent to Cutch State in India
- Patrick Miller of Dalswinton, engineer and inventor
- William Paterson, banker
- Thomas Telford, engineer
- Joseph Thomson, geologist and explorer
- John Laurie, actor who portrayed, among many other roles, Private Frazer in the BBC sitcom Dad's Army.
- Jane Haining Church of Scotland missionary in Hungary, murdered by Nazis for aiding Jews during the Holocaust
