= Moffat Water =

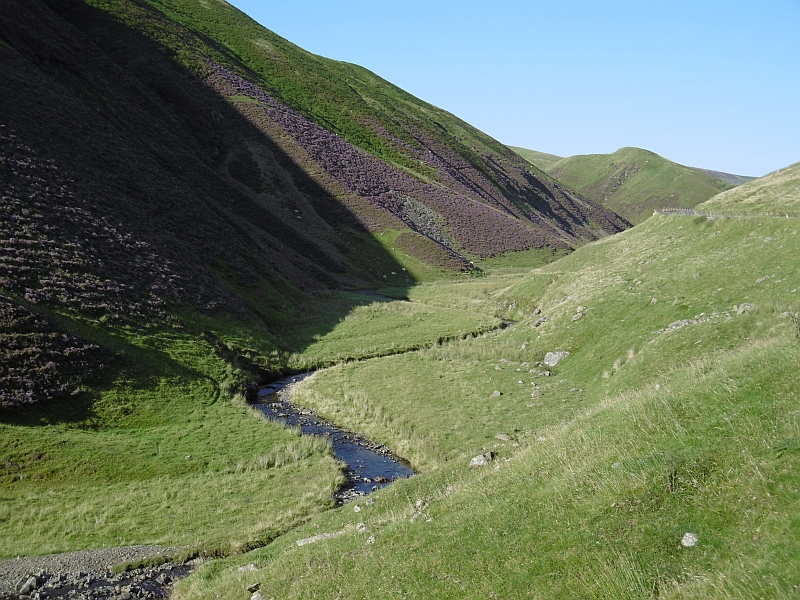
- The upper reaches of the Moffat Water

Physical characteristics
- Source: Moffat Hills
  - coordinates: 55°25′36″N 3°16′19″W
- Mouth: River Annan
  - coordinates: 55°18′19″N 3°25′39″W
- Length: 17 km (11 mi)

The Moffat Water is a minor river in northeastern Dumfriesshire, Scotland. Its headwaters rise at Birkhill in the midst of the Moffat Hills, close to the border with Selkirkshire (which corresponds to the watershed between the Annan and Ettrick basins). From here, it flows southwestwards through the narrow valley of Moffatdale, eventually joining the Annan and the Evan at Threewater Foot, south of Moffat town. Its tributaries include the Tail Burn, the outlet of Loch Skeen, which enters Moffatdale by way of a picturesque waterfall known as the Grey Mare's Tail.

== See also ==
- Dob's Linn
