= Lochcraig Head =

Hill in Scotland

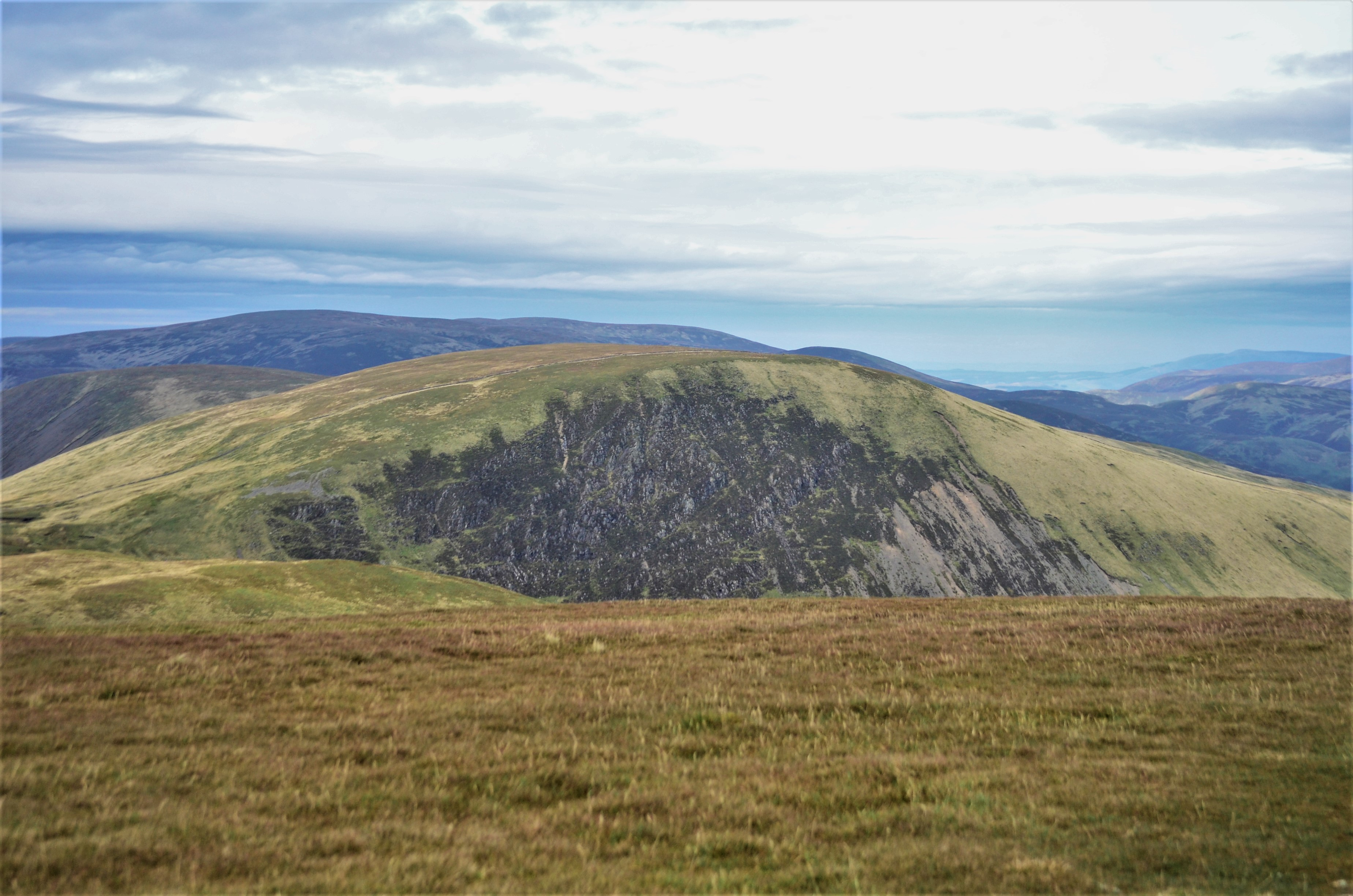

Highest point
- Elevation: 800.8 m (2,627 ft)
- Prominence: 108 m (354 ft)
- Listing: Hu,Tu,Sim, D,CT,DN,Y

Geography
- Location: Scottish Borders, Scotland
- Parent range: Moffat Hills, Southern Uplands
- OS grid: NT 16667 17743
- Topo map: OS Landranger 79

Lochcraig Head is a hill in the Moffat Hills range, part of the Southern Uplands of Scotland. The second highest in the range, its southern slopes drop dramatically into Loch Skeen, the highest loch in the Southern Uplands, from which the Grey Mare's Tail waterfall originates. A common ascent is as a round from the car park to the south, taking in White Coomb.

== Subsidiary SMC Summits ==
Summit	Height (m)	Listing
Nickies Knowe	760.8	DT,sSim
