= White Coomb =

Hill in the Moffat Hills of Scotland

Coordinates: 55.422578°N 3.323634°W

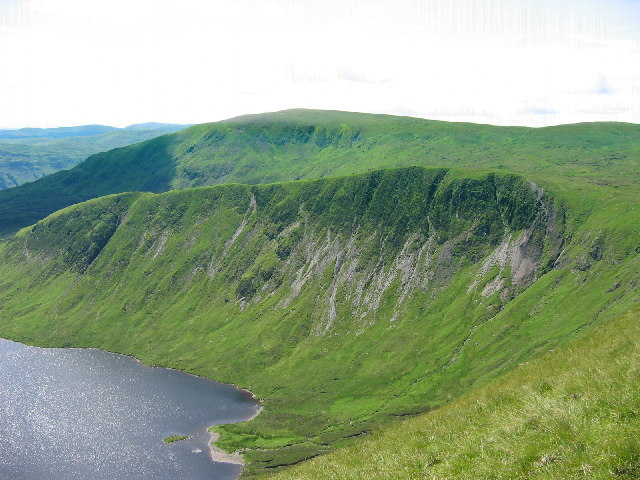

Highest point
- Elevation: 821 m (2,694 ft)
- Prominence: 374 m (1,227 ft)
- Listing: Ma,Hu,Tu,Sim, C, D,CoH,DN,Y

Geography
- Location: Dumfries and Galloway, Scotland
- Parent range: Moffat Hills, Southern Uplands
- OS grid: NT 16321 15090
- Topo map: OS Landranger 79

White Coomb is a hill in the Moffat Hills range, part of the Southern Uplands of Scotland. Its broad summit is the highest point in the range and the registration county of Dumfriesshire, as well as being the fourth highest point in southern Scotland, however, despite this, it is largely concealed by other hills on all sides except its east and south east, making this the only direction from which its full scale can be seen.

White Coomb is most easily climbed from the National Trust for Scotland car park underneath the Grey Mare's Tail waterfall, on the A708 from Moffat to Selkirk, at NT 186146. The most direct route heads directly west up a steep ridge, but a more comfortable route follows a well built footpath above the north side of the waterfall. Above the waterfall, the fast flowing Tail Burn must be crossed to avoid a long detour; although there are plenty of natural stepping stones, spate or icy conditions may make their use dangerous. From across the stream, the best route through the peat and heather follows the course of a wall leading to the summit of Upper Tarnberry. From there, the east ridge, which is steep and craggy in places, leads to the broad summit.

An alternative ascent, described by the Daily Telegraph as one of "Britain's finest half-day and day walks", follows the Tail Burn to the outlet of Loch Skeen before ascending the ridge to Mid Craig, and passing Donald's Cleuch Head to reach the summit. The descent suggested is via Rough Craig and south to join the road and walk back to the start point.

== Subsidiary summits ==
The Database of British and Irish hills lists 18 subsidiary summits of White Coomb.

Summit	Height (m)	Drop (m)	Grid ref	Notes
White Coomb	821	374	NT163150	Ma,C,D,CoH, cairn
Cape Law	722	93	NT131150	D,GTC,sHu, fence corner
Carlavin Hill	736	23	NT142188	DT,sGT,
Carrifran Gans	757	42	NT159138	GTC,DT, no feature
Din Law	667	53	NT124157	GTC,DT, small cairn
Ellers Cleuch Rig	610	7	NT126166	xDT, no feature
Erie Hill	690	92	NT124187	D,GTC,sHu, cairn
Firthhope Rig	800	26	NT153153	DT,sCT, no feature
Firthybrig Head	764	7	NT158171	xDT, wall junction
Garelet Dod	698	126	NT126172	Hu,D,GTC, no feature
Garelet Hill	680	24	NT124201	DT,sGT, trig point: OS measurement
Great Hill	774	28	NT145163	DT,sCT,
Laird's Cleuch Rig [Lairds Cleuch Rig]	684	50	NT125196	GTC,DT,
Lochcraig Head	801	108	NT167176	Hu,CTC,D, cairn
Mid Craig	729	21	NT164164	sGT,
Molls Cleuch Dod	785	39	NT151179	CTC,D, cairn
Nickies Knowe	761	29	NT164191	DT,sGT, no feature
Saddle Yoke	735	30	NT144123	GTC,DT, small cairn
Under Saddle Yoke	745	128	NT142126	Hu,D,GTC, no feature

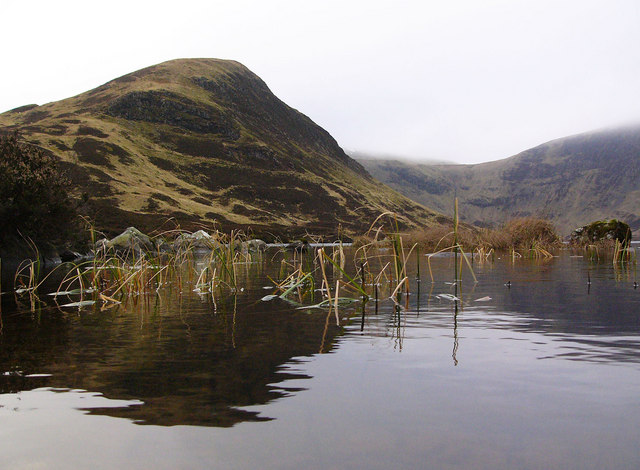
Mid Craig from Loch Skeen

== Bibliography ==
- The Corbetts and Other Scottish Hills, (SMC Guide) ISBN 0-907521-29-0
