= Whitehope Heights =

Hill in the Southern Uplands of Scotland

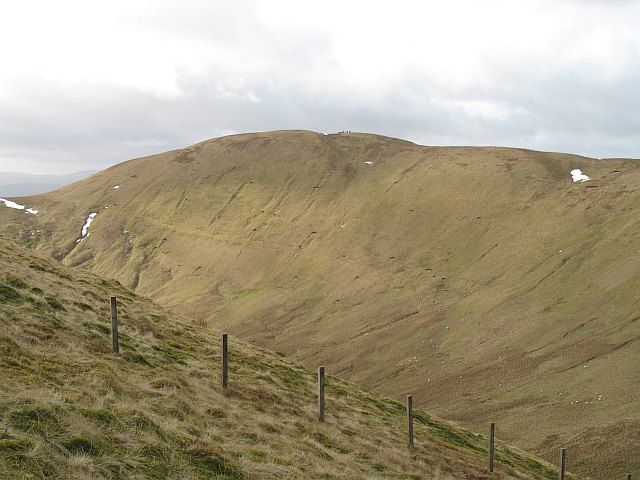

Highest point
- Elevation: 637 m (2,090 ft)
- Prominence: 109 m (358 ft)
- Listing: Hu,Tu,Sim,D,GT,DN,Y

Geography
- Location: Dumfries and Galloway, Scottish Borders, Scotland
- Parent range: Moffat Hills, Southern Uplands
- OS grid: NT 09575 13898
- Topo map: OS Landranger 78

Whitehope Heights is a hill in the Moffat Hills range, part of the Southern Uplands of Scotland. The lowest Donald hill in the range, it is separated from Hart Fell by a steep grassy cleuch known as The Gyle. Like its neighbour, the Dumfries and Galloway-Scottish Borders border runs along its summit. The southern slopes of the hill are part of the Corehead hill farm, an area owned by the Borders Forest Trust for the purposes of habitat regeneration; as a result, a large deer fence lines the boundary. East of the Devil's Beef Tub and Annandale Way, it is most frequently climbed from this direction, but ascents from Hart Fell are also common.
