= Moffat Hills =

Range of hills in the Southern Uplands of Scotland

Coordinates: 55.423°N 3.384°W

The Moffat Hills are a range of hills in the Southern Uplands of Scotland. They form a roughly triangular shape with a west facing side, a north facing side, and a south-east facing side. It is 17 kilometres from east to west across this triangle and some 16 kilometres north to south. The highest point is White Coomb at 821 m (2694 ft). The town of Moffat lies just south of the Moffat hills and along with Tweedsmuir, at the northern extremity, is the only centre of population around these hills. In some older maps, the northern part of the Moffat Hills is called the Tweedsmuir Hills, but can also be known by the title Manor Hills.

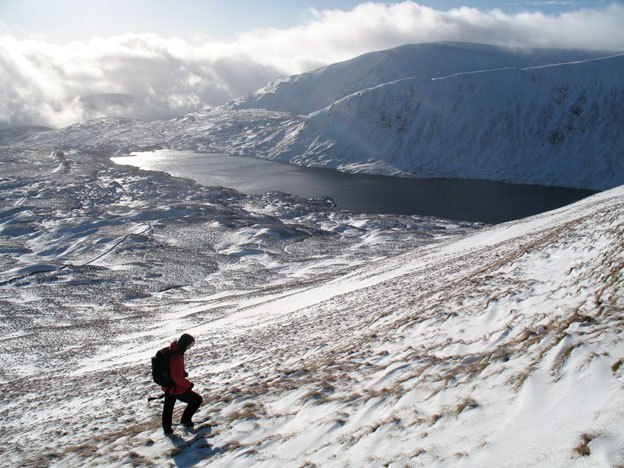
Looking SSW over Loch Skeen to Mid Craig (on the far side of the loch) and White Coomb beyond, from ascent of Lochcraig Head in winter conditions - the three arms of the letter "E" described below in routes from Loch Skeen.

== Roads, hills and water systems to the west ==
The west facing side of the Moffat hills is bounded by the River Annan and River Tweed - the source of both these rivers (which are little more than 1 kilometre apart at source) lie on this boundary. The Annan runs south into the Solway Firth but the Tweed heads north and then east to run through the border country to the North Sea at Berwick-Upon-Tweed.

Westward beyond the valley of the River Annan (Annandale) lies the main west coast corridor running northwards into central Scotland, carrying the west coast railway line and the M74 motorway.

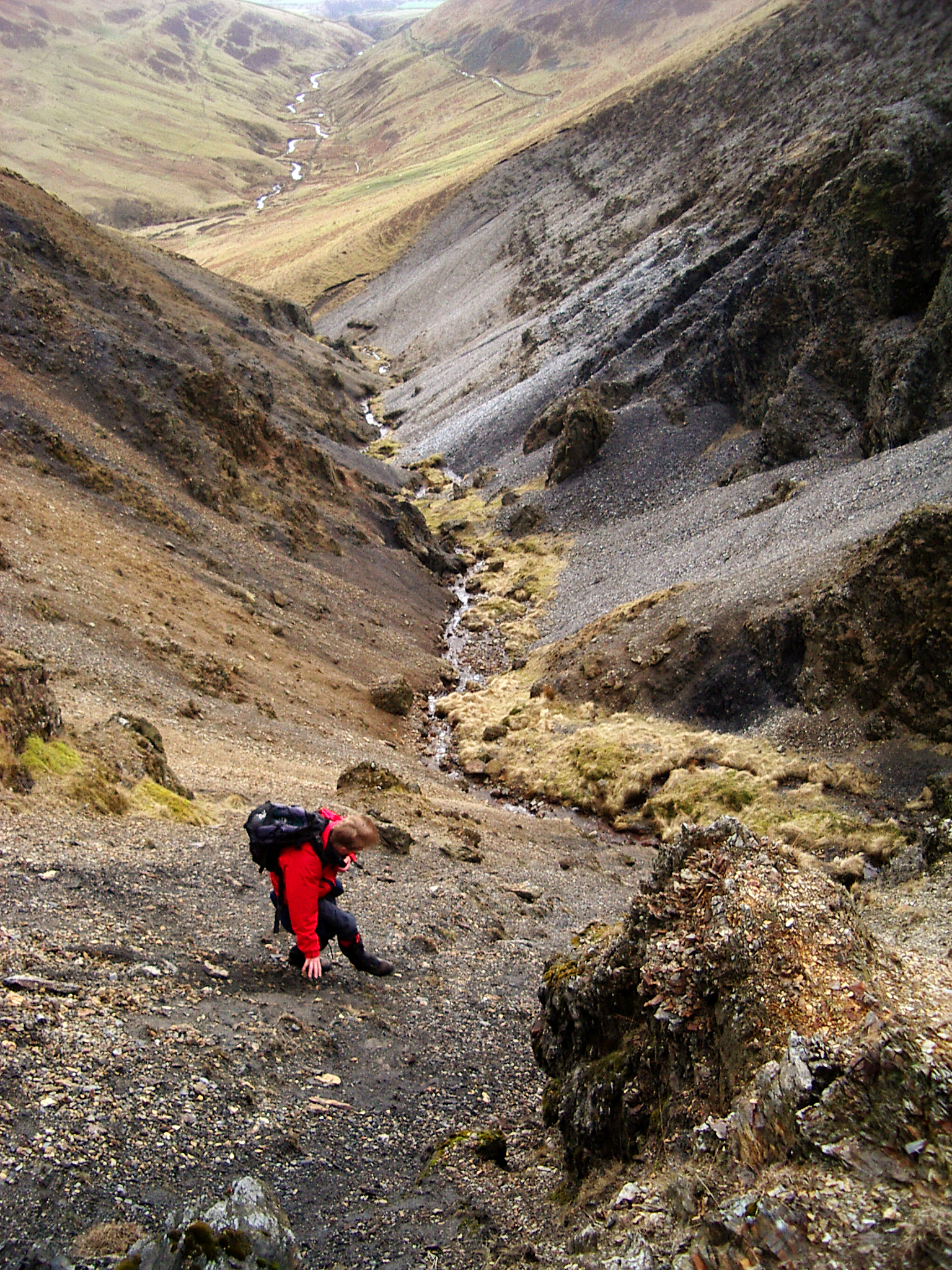
Scree run above Hartfell Spa.

The next range of hills to the west is the Lowther hills wherein lies the source of the River Clyde.

The A701 road from Moffat to Edinburgh rises rapidly from Moffat and is soon high above Annandale. At Annanhead where the source of the River Annan is, the A701 reaches the height of 395 metres and looks down into the Devil's Beef Tub. This is the watershed between the Annan and Tweed systems and it lies in the administrative region called Dumfries and Galloway. The source of the Tweed is in the Borders Region.

The regional boundary runs erratically eastward from Annanhead, then goes north around Loch Skeen (or Skene) before heading south east to Birkhill Cottage in Moffatdale where the pioneering geologist Charles Lapworth stayed from 1872 to 1877.

== Roads, hills and water systems to the north ==
The north facing side of the Moffat Hills is bounded by a minor road (no road number on the Ordnance Survey map) which runs from Tweedsmuir village to St Mary's Loch, passing along the banks of the Talla Reservoir and the Megget Reservoir and rising to 450 metres by the Megget Stone. The hills to the north here are called the Manor or Tweedsmuir hills and the hills to the north west of the Moffat hills are called the Culters (pronounced Cooters). There is a third reservoir within the Moffat hills area called the Fruid where two Bronze Age round houses have been excavated in recent times and on the road from Tweedsmuir to the Fruid there are also standing stones. In 1885 when the Talla dam was being built they put in a railway to help get construction materials to the site.

== Roads, hills and water systems to the south-east ==
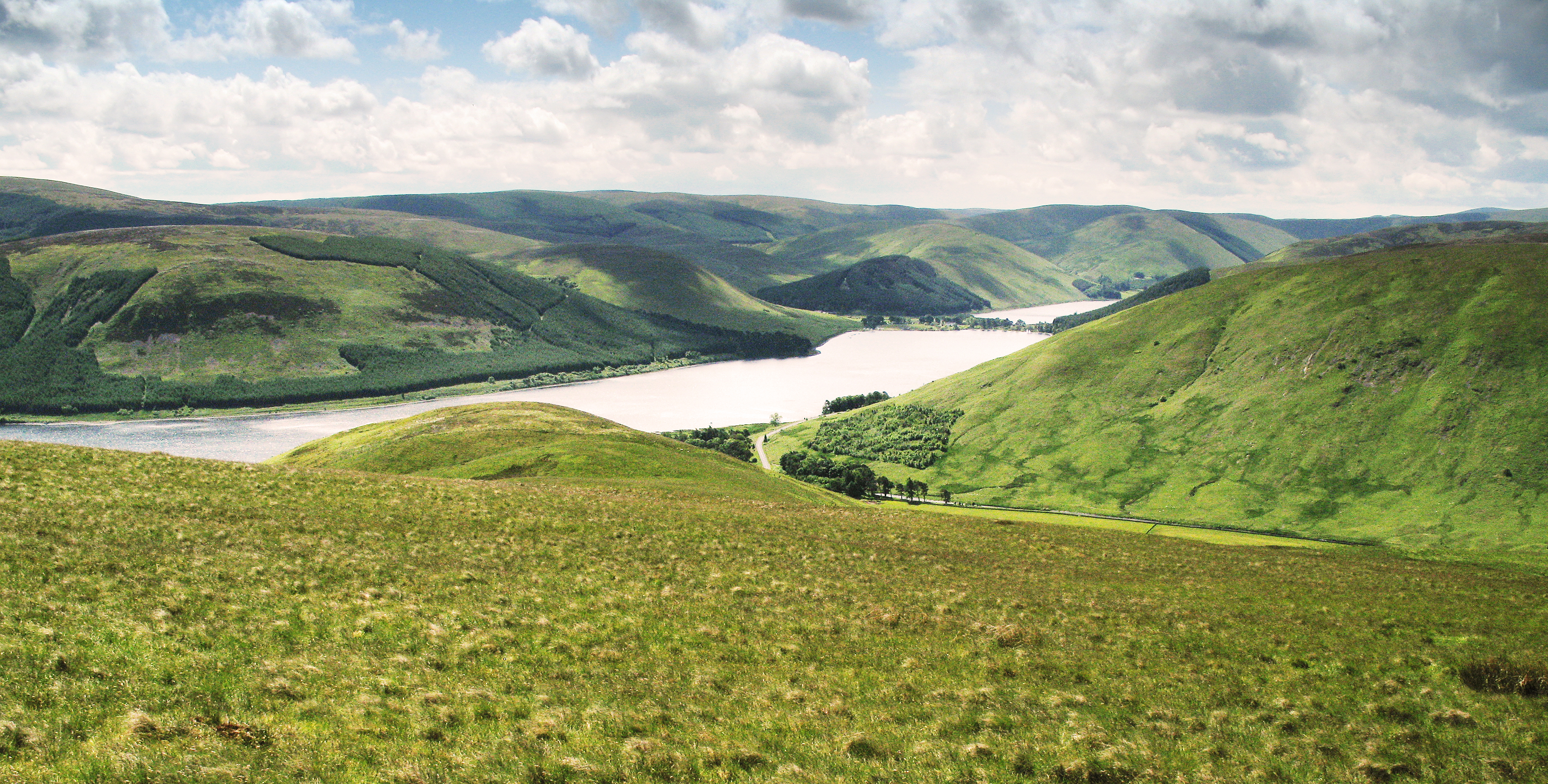
St Mary's Loch and Loch of the Lowes from above Capper Law. The minor road which runs from Tweedsmuir to St Mary's Loch past Talla and Megget reservoirs can be seen coming down to meet the A708 by the loch side in the middle of the picture. This is at Cappercleuch. The two lochs are separated by the narrow strip of land that can be seen in the middle distance and Tibbie Shiels Inn is on that strip of land. The southern Upland Way passes along the south side (far away side in this picture) of St Mary's Loch

The south-east facing side of the Moffat Hills runs down the shore of St Mary's Loch and Loch of the Lowes - not to be confused with Loch of the Lowes in Perthshire. Where these two lochs almost join there is a monument to James Hogg the Ettrick Shepherd, visit Tibbie Shiels Inn and then follow the Moffat Water down Moffatdale past the Grey Mare's Tail waterfall.

The A708 Moffat to Selkirk road runs along this route twisting and turning through some spectacular scenery though with sheep wandering freely on the unfenced road you have to be careful on it. There is a Carrifran Wildwood project in progress to restore a wild woodland environment, as it would have been six thousand years ago, to the treeless Carrifran Glen.

The hill range to the south east of Moffatdale is called the Ettrick Hills and the Ettrick Water has its source in the middle of these hills before it runs north eastward to join the Yarrow Water at Philiphaugh (where the Yarrow loses its name to the Ettrick). The head waters of the Yarrow are just east of Birkhill and the water from there runs through both Loch of the Lowes and St Mary's Loch. Once the Yarrow and the Ettrick Waters join they in turn lose their identity when they meet the River Tweed between Selkirk and Galashiels.

== Annandale Way ==
The Annandale Way is a new 55 mile (85 km) long-distance walking route which follows the valley of the river Annan from its source to the sea. The route was launched on 12 September 2009 and can be walked either north to south or south to north. It has been developed by Sulwath Connections and local communities with the support of local estates and farmers to help promote Annandale as a new area for walking. From the northern end It starts high above the source of the river Annan with a circumnavigation of the Devils Beef Tub before dropping down its eastern side and following the river Annan along the valley bottom into the picturesque market town of Moffat. From there it follows the valley of the river Annan through the historic town of Annan to the southern end of the walk where the river runs into the Solway Firth. There is a choice of alternative routes for two sections of the walk. The Way has been designed to be achievable in 4 to 5 days as a continuous walk but it also offers several fine day walks.

== Freedom of access ==
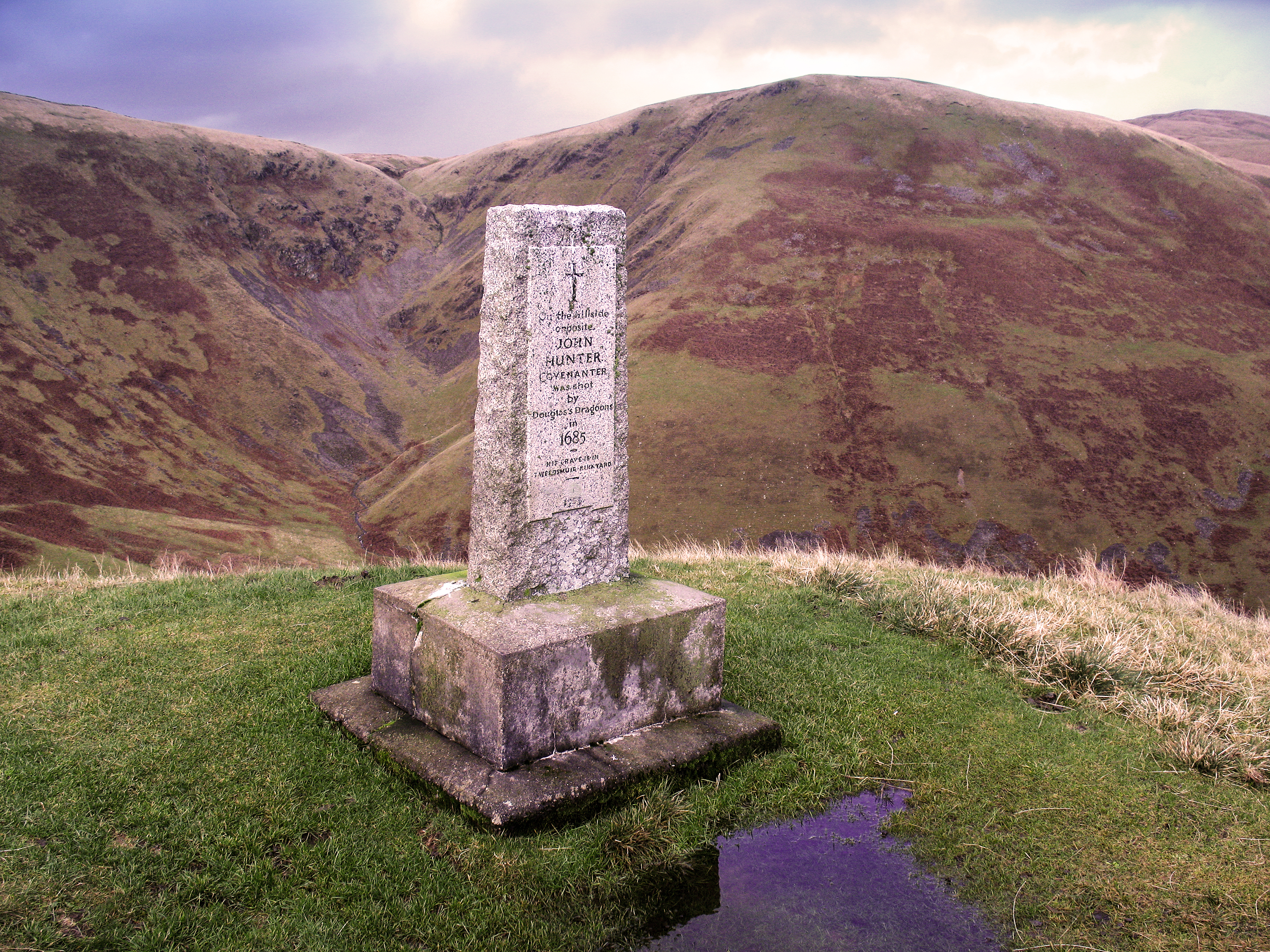
Covenanter Monument to John Hunter above the Devil's Beef Tub --- Inscription on the monument reads "On the hillside opposite John Hunter Covenanter was shot by Douglas's Dragoons 1685 his grave is in Tweedsmuir Kirkyard"

Freedom of Access, the right to roam where you choose, was written into Scottish law by the new Scottish Parliament in 2002. Prior to that it had been an unwritten right by custom. In the Southern Uplands of Scotland there are plenty of wild places in which to exercise this right, of which The Moffat Hills range is amongst the best.

== Points of access ==
With this freedom of access it is theoretically possible to enter these hills anywhere one chooses; but in practice, in most cases, a car has to be parked somewhere and this immediately cuts down the options since the roads on all three sides are not at all suitable for random parking for any length of time. Besides this there are a number of particularly useful points of entry to the hills depending on what area of the hills is to be visited. We will consider these points of access based on the three-sided triangle described above and so we have access from; Moffatdale in the south east, Annandale in the west and the Megget stone in the north. These are the most scenically interesting and challenging entry points and the ones that most walkers would choose. Coming in from the direction of the River Tweed the landscape is nothing like so dramatic.

== Access from Moffatdale ==
The routes from Moffatdale into the hills would generally be recognised to be the most spectacular because of the variety of scenery and general quality (and variety) of walking interest they offer. There are three main points of entry from Moffatdale; Capplegill, Carrifran and Grey Mare's Tail.

According to legend, Bodesbeck Farm, near to Moffat Water, was once been the home of a brownie.

=== From Capplegill ===
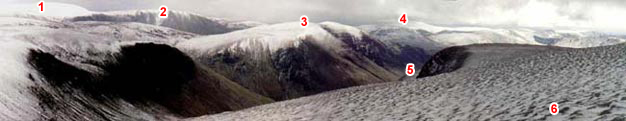
Moffat hills from Hartfell ----- 1 White Coomb -- 2 Carrifran Gans -- 3 Saddle Yoke -- 4 Ettrick Pen (Ettrick hills) -- 5 Glen of the Blackhope Burn -- 6 Hartfell

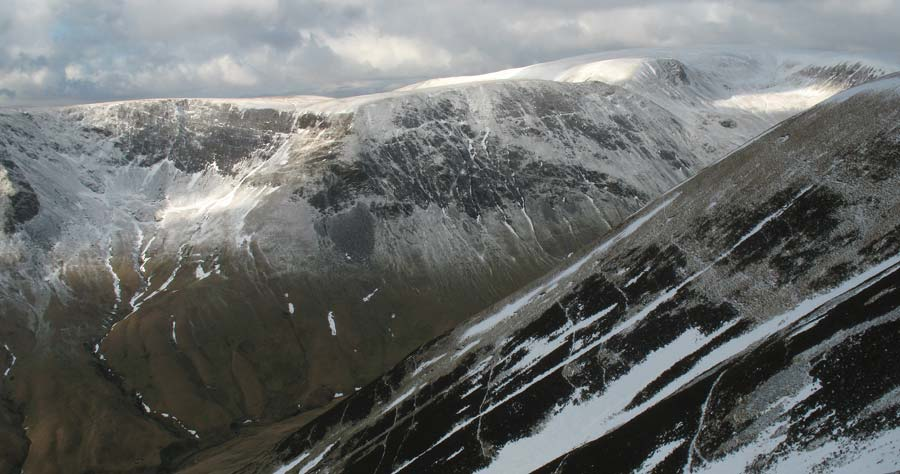
From the top of Saddle Yoke looking WNW across the face of Under Saddle Yoke and over Blackhope Glen to Falcon Craig (in the middle of the picture) with Hartfell near the right edge.

The Blackhope Burn joins Moffat Water close to a farm called Capplegill (OS. Ref. NT147098) on the A708. Just to the north east of Capplegill (roughly 150 metres) there is room for a car or two to park by Blackshope house. The classic walk from here is to head north from where you are parked passing through a field where there are usually Belted Galloways to be seen, and up onto Saddle Yoke which as the name implies has two tops with a short saddle between them. These tops are Saddle Yoke (just over 630 metres high ) and Under Saddle Yoke (745 metres.

From there descend to the water course in Whirly Gill before climbing to the top of Saddle Craigs at the head of the Blackhope Glen and just below Hartfell Rig (739 metres). An alternative to this is to go up onto the rig itself but that would be to miss the views from the top of the crags that are Saddle Craigs.

Now climb to the summit of Hart Fell and then follow the ridge from there back to Capplegill going over Swatte Fell en route. In other words, this route goes up one side of the hills above Blackhope Glen and back down the other. The crags on this return leg are quite spectacular (particularly around Hound Shoulder) with views over the glen to Under Saddle Yoke then Carrifran Gans and White Coomb (the highest hill in the Moffat Hills) beyond.

Capplegill is also a useful access point to the Ettrick Hills which lie south of Moffatdale.

=== From Carrifran ===
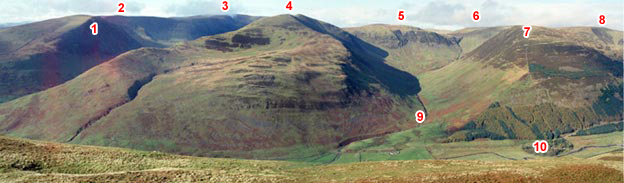
Moffat hills from Bodesbeck Ridge ----- 1 Black Craig -- 2 Swatte Fell -- 3 Hartfell -- 4 Saddle Yoke -- 5 Raven Craig -- 6 Firthhope Rig -- 7 Carrifran Gans -- 8 White Coomb -- 9 Carrifran Glen -- 10 Moffatdale

There is parking associated with Carrifran Wildwood project at OS Ref NT163117 which can be used for this route. It is a steep climb from there to the top of Carrifran Gans (nearly 670 metres in 2 kilometres).

From there it is possible to either take in White Coomb and Firthhope Rig in the next stage or, descend to the more interesting waterfalls around Firthhope Burn - White Coomb can be saved for the Grey Mare's Tail routes. Around the waterfalls offers the best views and also some quite interesting terrain to scramble over - not only around the waterfalls themselves but also while crossing the face of the steep lower slopes of Firthhope Rig on the way up to Games Castle (a natural feature resembling a castle) and Rotten Bottom (the sump area for all the peat hags round about).

Now the route heads along the top of the crags of Raven Craig and Priest Craig (i.e. around the top of Carrifran Glen) and towards Saddle Yoke from where it makes its way down to where the car is parked. Here again the route goes up one side of a glen (Carrifran Glen) and back the other, along the tops above the glen.

=== From Grey Mare's Tail ===
Parking at the Grey Mare's Tail is in the National Trust for Scotland car park and there is a path constructed by them up the side of the hill from there towards Loch Skeen to follow. There are plenty of warnings around this path of the fatalities which have occurred to those who have left the path to get a better view of the waterfall and slid down the steep sides of the hill. Because of the spectacular scenery, the walk up to Loch Skeen is very popular indeed with the casual visiting tourist, but really, proper hill walking footwear is necessary for this path. This is very often not the case for those who go there on impulse and not equipped for the terrain. There is a visitor centre by the car park where it is possible to "watch live" wild birds nesting - as viewed from a remote camera on the hillside.

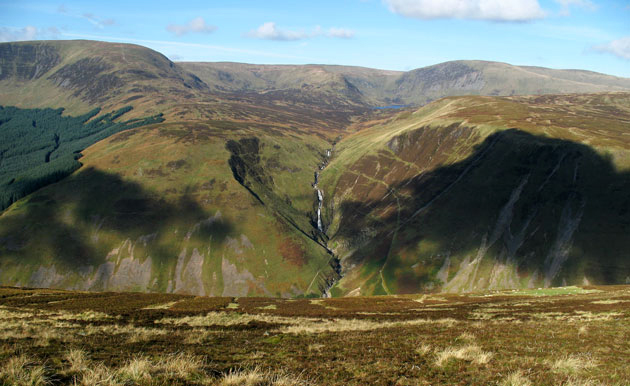
Grey Mare's Tail in the Moffat Hills from the Bodesbeck Ridge in the Ettrick hills.

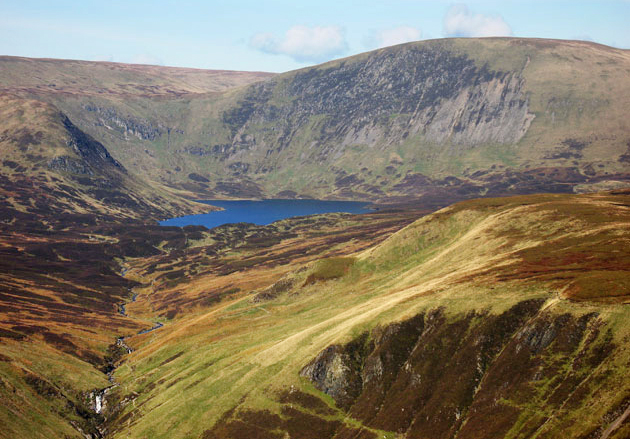
Detail from above photograph of Grey Mare's Tail, showing Loch Skeen with outflow into the Tail Burn which feeds the Grey Mare's Tail Moffat Hills.

From Loch Skeen there are a range of options open to the walker.

- To go round Loch Skeen over Lochcraig Head, which involves a 280-metre climb from the loch level - and continue along the tops to White Coomb and then back down to where the Tail Burn runs out of the loch and thence back to the car park.
- Between Lochcraig Head and White Coomb there is a small but characterful ridge that can be taken up or down over Mid Craig with access from the point where the Tail Burn exits from the Loch. Using this it is possible to go either left to White Coomb or right to Lochcraig Head from the top of the ridge. Mid Craig ridge is therefore like the shorter middle horizontal stroke in a letter "E" with White Coomb and Lochcraig Head being the longer ridges at either end of the "E" and Firthybrig Head ridge being its back. This layout of these ridges allows for a choice of routes in itself.
- It is possible to head directly from White Coomb back down to the car park - though the final descent into Moffatdale on this route is steep and not advised in slippery conditions whether wet or icy. However you can get some interesting views of the Grey Mare's Tail at the top of that descent.

Any combination of these routes is of course possible.

The hills around Loch Skeen offer classic geological features of international interest. Loch Skeen has also been used successfully to try to preserve the endangered species of fish called the vendace which has a history in Britain going back to glacial times. There were vendace in the Lochmaben Lochs until as recently as 1963. As these lochs silted up and the vendace were threatened an unsuccessful attempt was made by Dr Peter Maitland of Stirling University to transfer some to Loch Trool in the Galloway hills before they became extinct.

It is the heavily glaciated shapely landscape in these hills which offers such visual interest to the walker. The surface of Loch Skeen is 510 metres above sea level and as such is probably the highest loch of any great size in the South of Scotland.

== Access from Annandale ==
=== From Annanhead ===
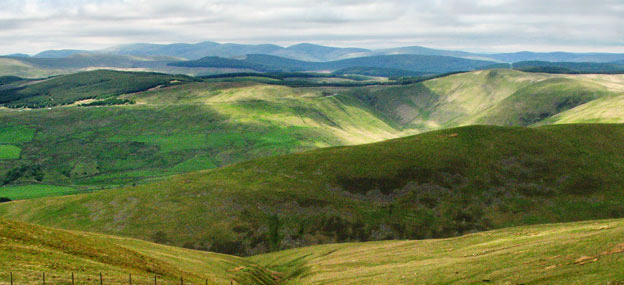
From Hartfell looking west to the great bowl among the hills that is the Devil's Beef Tub (in sunlight) with Annanhead to the right of the picture above the Beef Tub. The M74 and main west coast rail line corridor lies in the valley beyond that and the Lowther hills are in the distance. The lush green valley of the river Annan (Annandale) is in the left foreground and the A701 climbs up from left to right above this valley from Moffat town to Annanhead, Tweedsmuir and, eventually, Edinburgh.

The classic route here is to park at Annanhead above the Devil's Beef Tub (room for several vehicles there) and walk up over Annanhead Hill, Great Hill and Chalk Rig Edge to Whitehope Heights, a route which goes round the top of the Beef Tub. From Whitehope Heights most walkers would choose to go on to the top of Hartfell.

Mostly the return route would be to just return by the route taken outwards, but it is possible to go down over Arthur's Seat to the River Annan at Ericstane, climb out of the other side of the valley and onto the A701 and hence back to Annanhead. The area in the valley around Ericstane is rich in ancient remains (settlements and burnt mounds) and before you get back to where the car is parked you will pass a monument above the Beef Tub to John Hunter of Tweedsmuir, a covenanter who was shot in 1685 while trying to escape from dragoons by climbing the side of the Beef Tub.

=== From Moffat Well ===
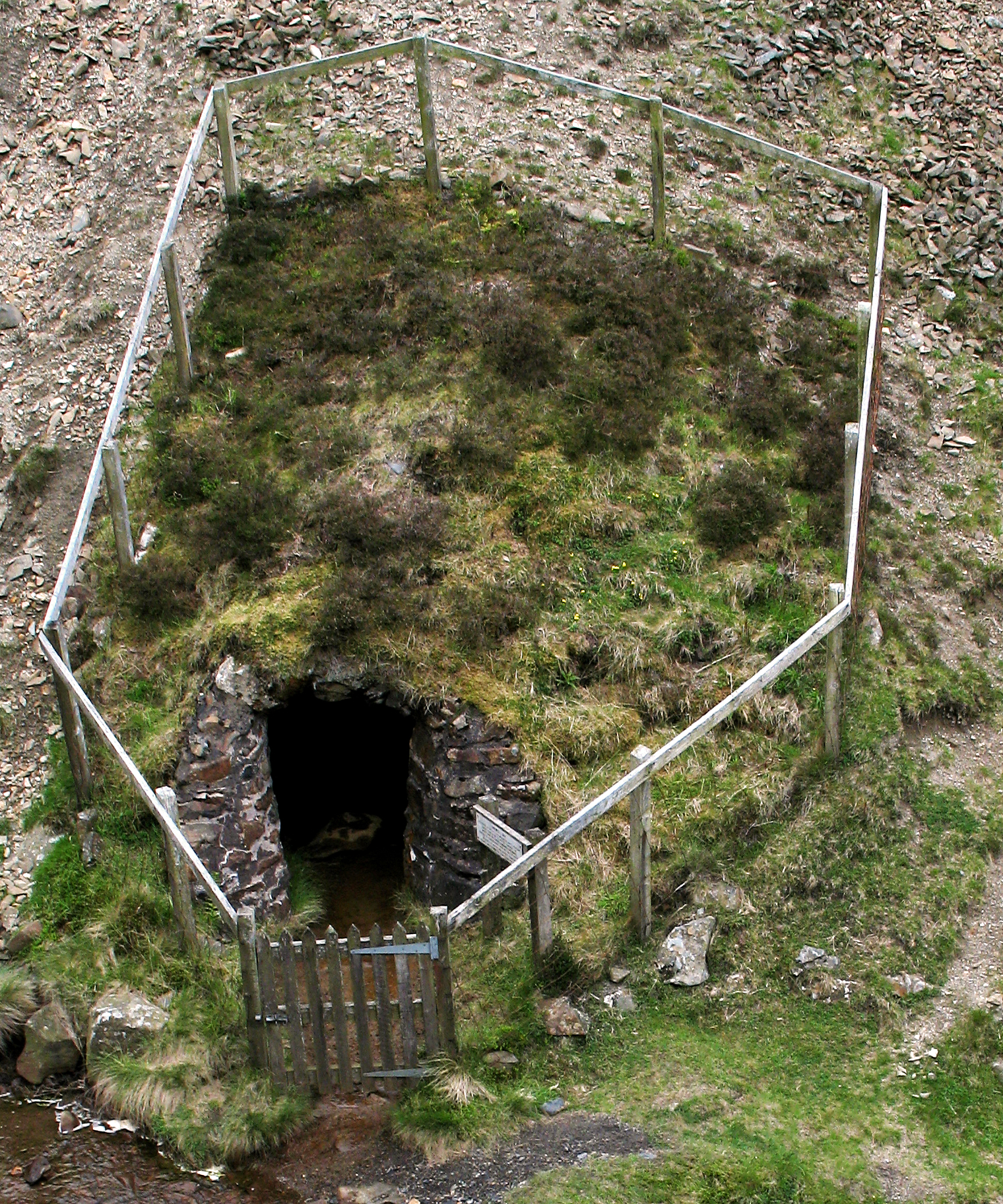
Entrance to Hartfell Spa

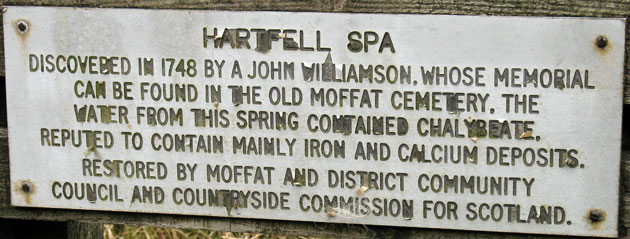
Sign at Hartfell Spa

Park at Moffat Well some 2 kilometres north of the town of Moffat (after finding your way through the back streets of Moffat to get there) and then head up over Greygill Head and Blue Cairn to Swatte Fell. From there most walkers would probably want to go to Hartfell. On the return leg head back to Birnock Cloves just to the south of Swatte Fell summit and from there down Birnock Water back to Moffat Well.

The sulphurous waters of Moffat Well were believed to have healing properties and during the Victorian era the high demand for this led to the water being piped down from the well to a specially built bath house in the town centre (now the Town Hall).

=== From the Community Hall Upper Annandale ===
To get to the community hall (OS. Ref. NT075103) proceed northwards on the A701 heading out of Moffat town centre till you arrive at a mini roundabout by the school. This is just before you reach the 30 miles per hour sign at the edge of town. Leave the A701 at this point forking right onto the minor road which goes through to Corehead and gives access to the Devil's Beef Tub itself. The community hall is on your right some four and a half kilometres along this road near a sign for "Hartfell Spa" (where there is a Chalybeate spring). The Borders Forest Trust took over ownership of Corehead in July 2009. They aim to return lost wildlife and habitats to Corehead and to conserve the unique character of the Devil's Beef Tub. The hills and valleys were once cloaked with the native woodland which made up the Ettrick Forest.

From the community hall follow the track towards the spa. After about one and a half kilometres the track enters the valley of the Auchencat Burn at a metal gate. From there descend from the path to the burn and choose one of the rough planks over the burn to cross it. From the burn climb to Swatte Fell, go on to Hartfell and come down over Arthur's Seat making for the gully above the spa. The descent down this gully to the spa is on steep slate-like scree and is quite interesting as is the spa itself. From there just follow the spa path back to the community hall.

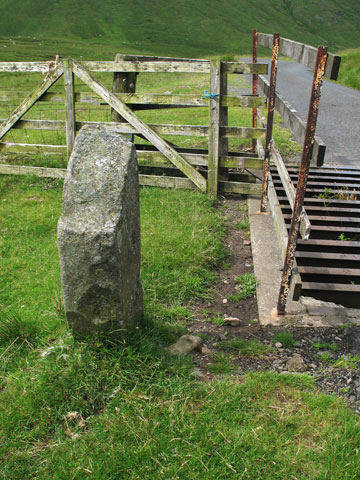
Megget Stone at the highest point on the minor road between Talla reservoir and Megget reservoir

== Access from the Megget Stane ==
The Megget Stane (OS. Ref. NT152203) is by a cattle grid at the highest point between the Talla and Megget reservoirs on the minor road which runs from Tweedsmuir on the A701 to Cappercleuch by shore of St Mary's Loch. It is quite easy to miss the stone when coming from Talla as it is hidden by a gate. At an elevation of over 430 metres, parking here offers a high starting point whether into the Manor hills to the north or the Moffat hills to the south. No specific folklore or other traditions have been found associated with this stone but it is likely that, being at the watershed as it is, the spot would have been used as a meeting place or tryst, as are similar places throughout the Scottish Borders.

There are two ridges running in a southerly direction from here which can be taken into the Lochcraig Head area above Loch Skeen and it is quite possible to go out on one ridge and back on the other in a relatively undemanding day's walk. This walk can be lengthened slightly by taking in Dead For Cauld which offers fine views over the Megget reservoir. From there proceed over Port Hill, Nickie's Knowe and Talla East Side to Lochcraig Head and back by Firthybrig Head, Molls Cleuch Dod and Carlavin Hill to the Megget Stane.

== See also ==
- Dob's Linn
