= White Comb =

White Comb may be a misspelling of:

- White Combe, a hill in England
- White Coomb, a hill in Scotland
