= Under Saddle Yoke =

Hill in the Moffat Hills range, Southern Uplands, Scotland

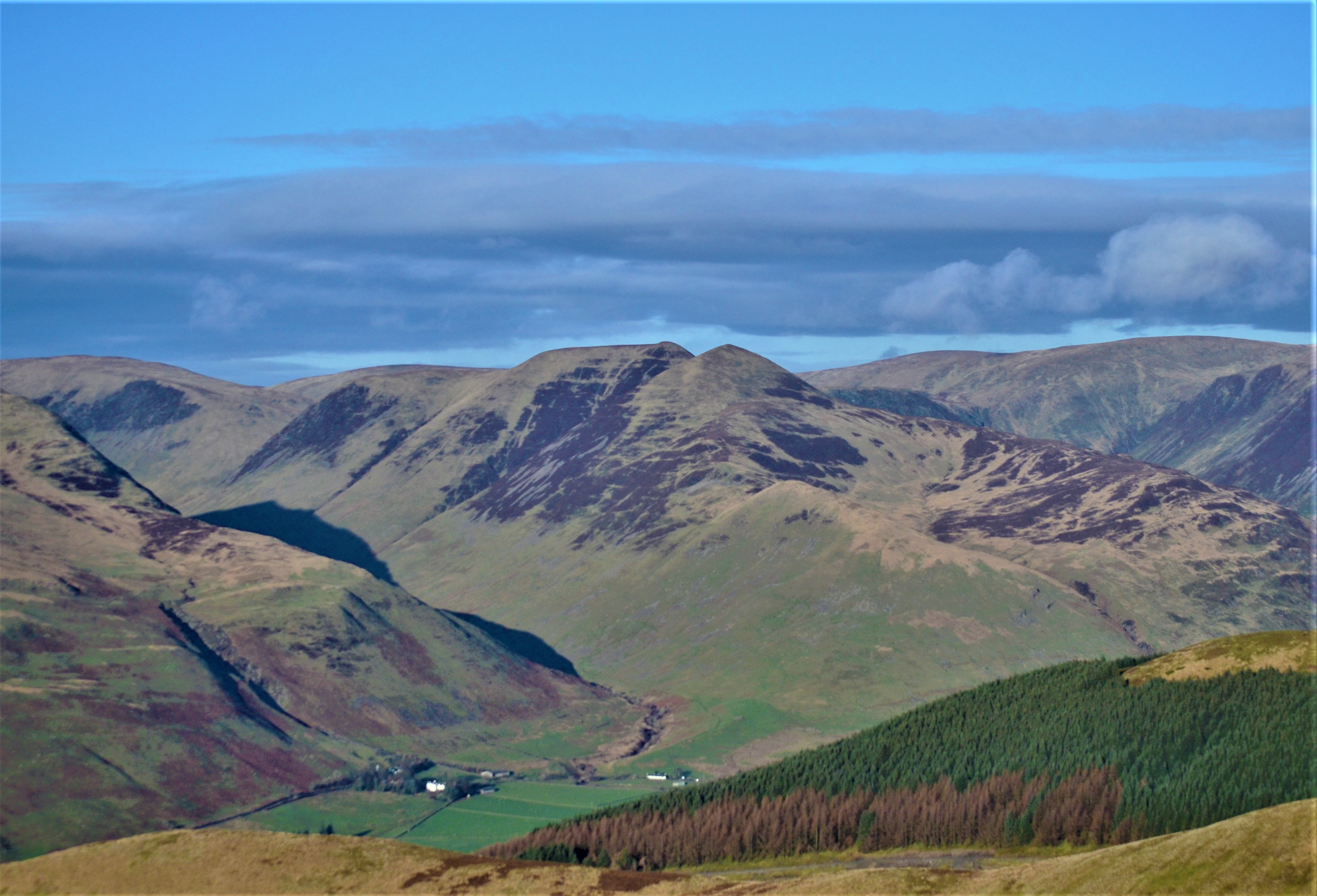

Highest point
- Elevation: 745 m (2,444 ft)
- Prominence: 128 m (420 ft)
- Listing: Hu,Tu,Sim, D,GT,DN,Y

Geography
- Location: Dumfries and Galloway, Scotland
- Parent range: Moffat Hills, Southern Uplands
- OS grid: NT 14250 12626
- Topo map: OS Landranger 77

Under Saddle Yoke is a hill in the Moffat Hills range, part of the Southern Uplands of Scotland. Despite its name, it is 10m higher than its neighbouring top, Saddle Yoke. Located in a dramatic position on a small, grassy ridge in between two deep glens, Blackhope and Carrifran, it awards excellent views into the rest of the Moffat Hills and the Ettrick Hills opposite. Although incomparable to the Scottish Highlands and not particularly precipitous, the ridge between and atop the Yokes is the narrowest summit ridge in the Southern Uplands. The electric fence that comes out of Blackshope and crosses the ridge to the north of Saddle Yoke and then continues down into Carrifran hasn't worked in 40 years. A popular round known as the Hart Fell Horseshoe begins near Blackshope and normally ascends Nether Coomb Craig first, then passing over Swatte Fell, Hart Fell and looping round Hartfell Rig to the Saddle Yokes before the descent.

== Subsidiary SMC Summits ==
| Summit | Height (m) | Listing |
|---|---|---|
| Saddle Yoke | 735.5 | Tu,Sim,DT,GT,DN |
