= Molls Cleuch Dod =

Hill in Scotland

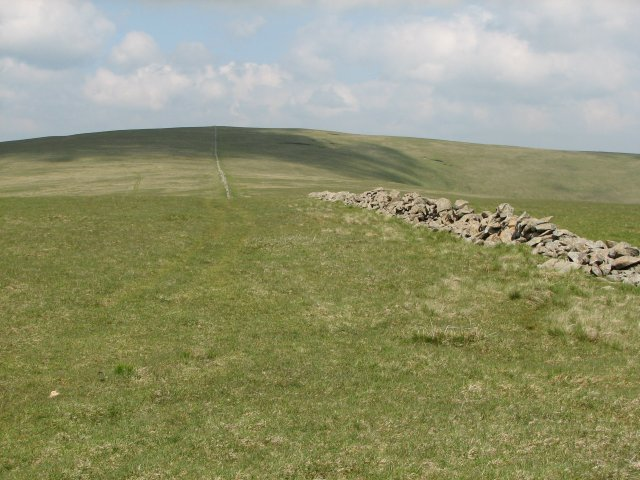

Highest point
- Elevation: 785 m (2,575 ft)
- Prominence: 39 m (128 ft)
- Listing: Tu,Sim, D,CT,DN

Geography
- Location: Scottish Borders, Scotland
- Parent range: Moffat Hills, Southern Uplands
- OS grid: NT 15113 17931
- Topo map: OS Landranger 79

Molls Cleuch Dod is a hill in the Moffat Hills range, part of the Southern Uplands of Scotland. A broad, grassy outlier of the surrounding hills, it is commonly ascended in rounds beginning from the Megget Stane and Talla Linnfoots or as a detour from the Grey Mare's Tail.

== Subsidiary SMC Summits ==
Summit	Height (m)	Listing
Carlavin Hill	736	DT,sSim
