= Dob's Linn =

Valley in Dumfries and Galloway, Scotland

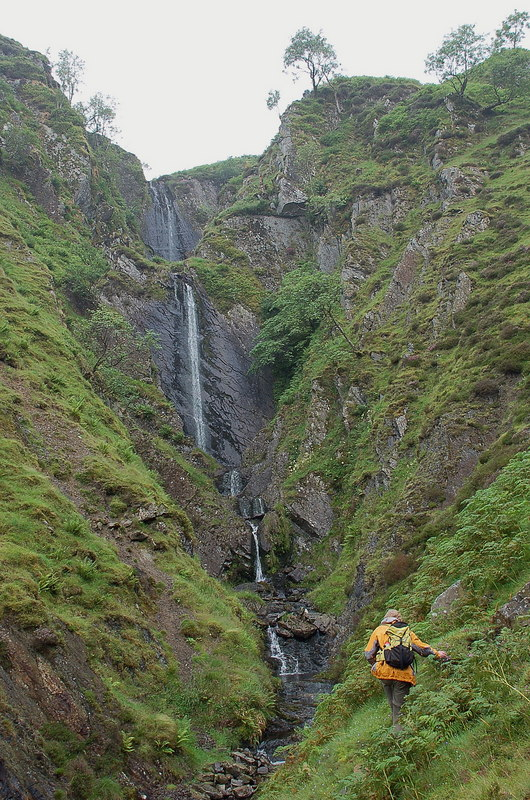
- Waterfalls at Dob's Linn

- Location within Scotland
- Floor elevation: 300 m (980 ft)

Geography
- Country: Scotland
- District: Dumfries and Galloway
- Coordinates: 55.4297°N 3.2697°W
- Interactive map of Dob's Linn

Dob's Linn is a small steep valley in Dumfries and Galloway, just north of the A708 road between Moffat and Selkirk, in Scotland. It is part of the Grey Mare's Tail Nature Reserve which is owned by the National Trust for Scotland. According to tradition, Dob's Linn is named for a covenanter, Halbert Dobson, who took refuge there from Government troops during the Killing Time in the late 17th century.

Dob's Linn is important in geology as the location of the Global Boundary Stratotype Section and Point (GSSP) which marks the boundary between the Ordovician and Silurian periods, and marks the base of the Llandovery epoch, on the geologic time scale. Dob's Linn was ratified as the GSSP by the International Union of Geological Sciences in 1984.

The boundary is defined as the first appearance of graptolites Parakidograptus acuminatus and Akidograptus ascensu 1.6 m above the base of the Birkhill Shale Formation. The shale section also contains chitinozoa and conodonts, but neither are well preserved. Dob's Linn has been criticized for the difficulty in relating its graptolite biostratigraphic sequence with shallow water sequences elsewhere, although the stratotype also appears to correspond with a carbon-13 isotope excursion in the latest Ordovician which can be identified worldwide.

The area was first studied by Charles Lapworth in the late 19th century. His work established fossil graptolites as a method of understanding stratigraphic sequences. A more recent description of the area, enumerating the zones established by Lapworth, is given in the British Regional Geology Monograph. Before Lapworth's work, it was thought that the Silurian rocks of the Southern Uplands formed a single sequence, that would have to be about 6000m in thickness. By his identification of particular graptolite species in different zones of the Dob's Linn exposure, Lapworth was able to demonstrate that the Uplands consist of a much thinner layer, consistent with Silurian deposits elsewhere, that had been repeatedly folded and faulted, with multiple repetitions of the same strata, often upside down. The understanding that sequences of sedimentary rocks could be inverted played an important part in the later resolution of the Highlands Controversy in which Lapworth was also involved.

== See also ==
- List of waterfalls
- List of waterfalls in Scotland

== Gallery ==
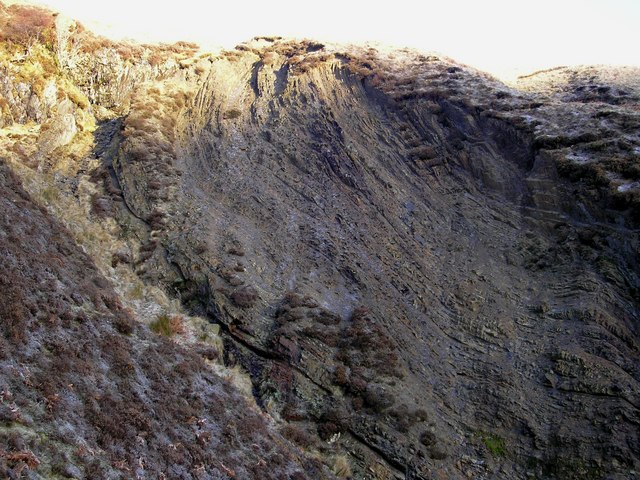
Folds in the Rock Strata high up in the Dob's Linn Gorge

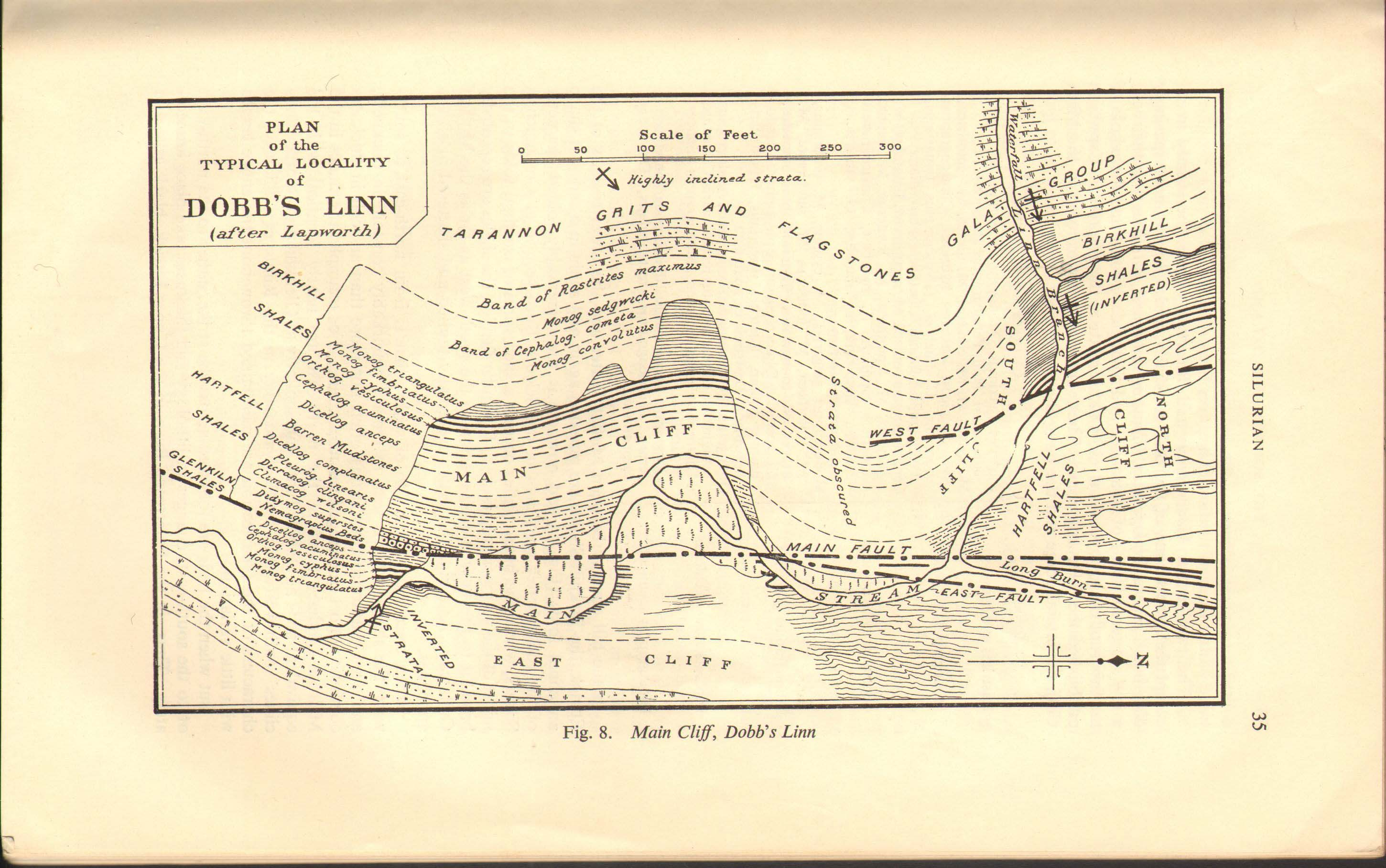
Plan of the typical locality of Dobb's Linn (sic) (after Lapworth)

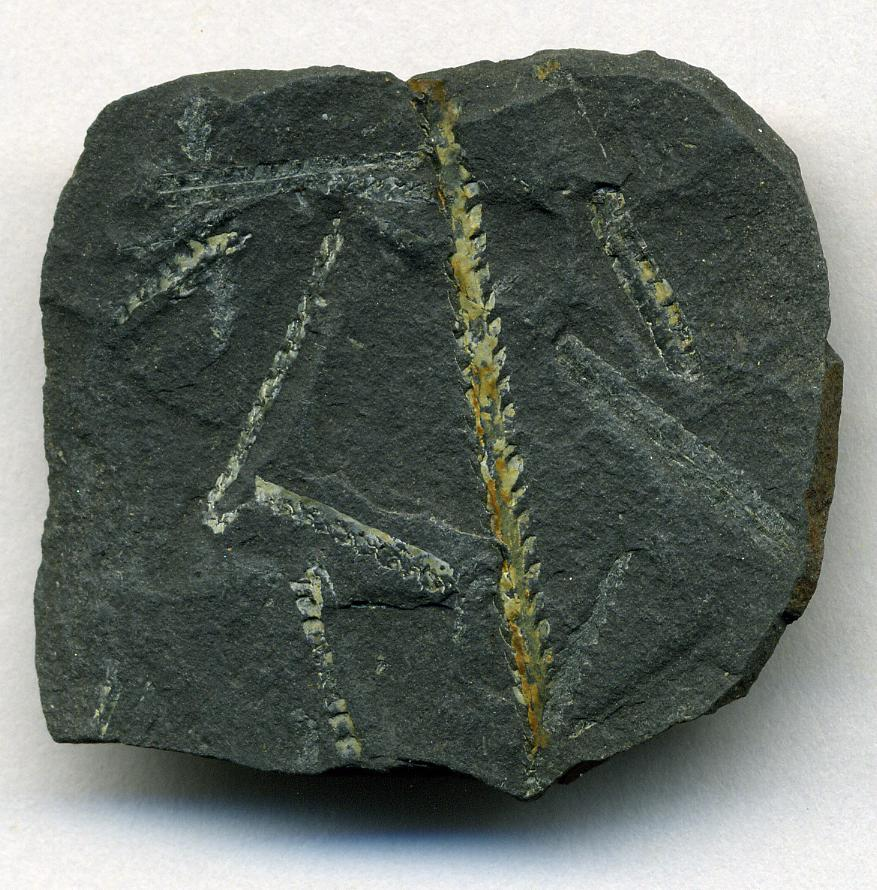
Climacograptus wilsoni graptolite fossils on black shale (26 x 25 millimetres) of middle Ordovician age (Soudleyan Stage, ~mid-Caradocian) from the main cliff at Dob's Linn (about 36.1-43.1 metres below the Ordovician-Silurian boundary GSSP

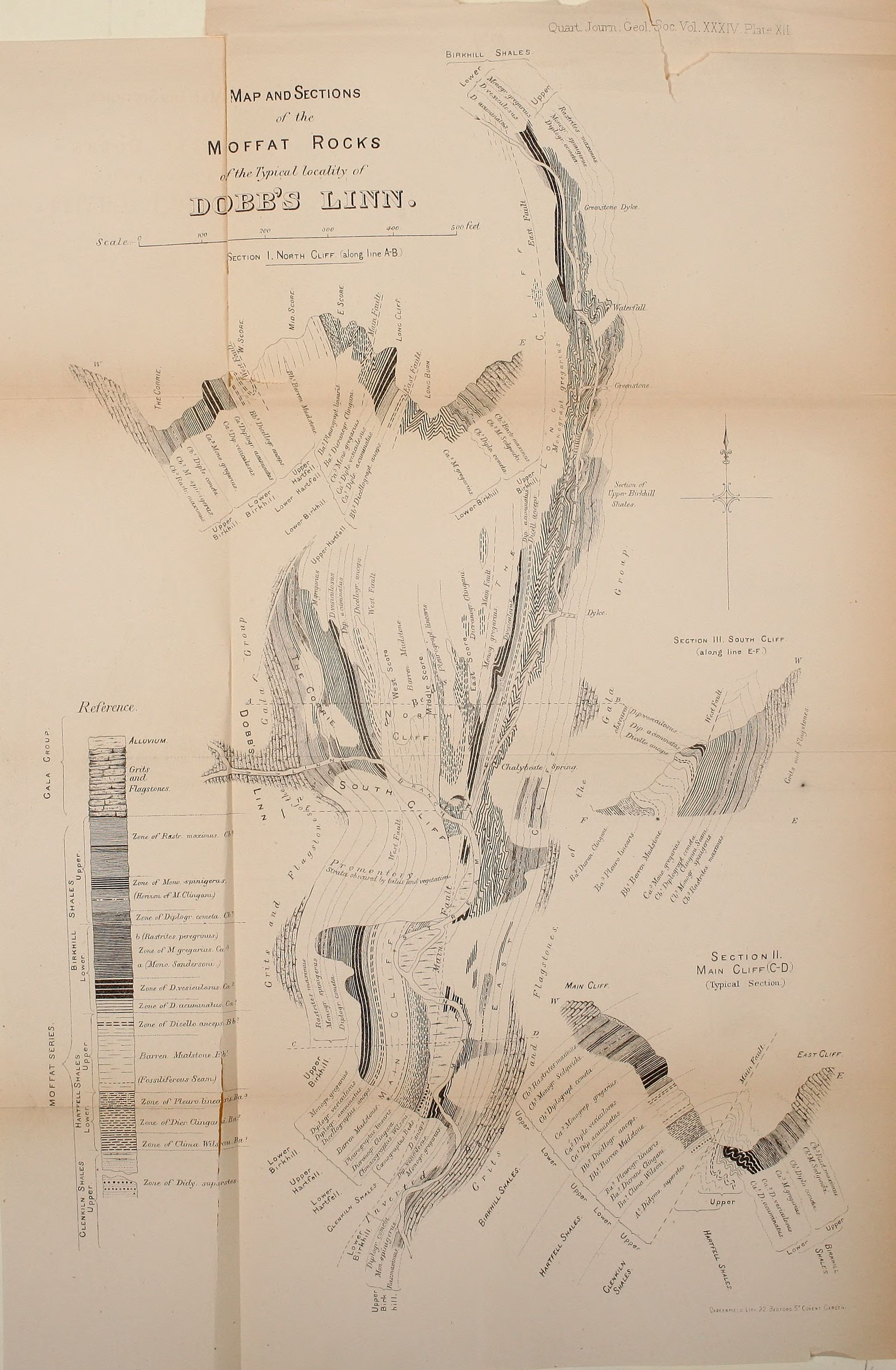
Lapworth's original map of the exposure at Dob's Linn
