= Swatte Fell =

Hill in the Southern Uplands of Scotland

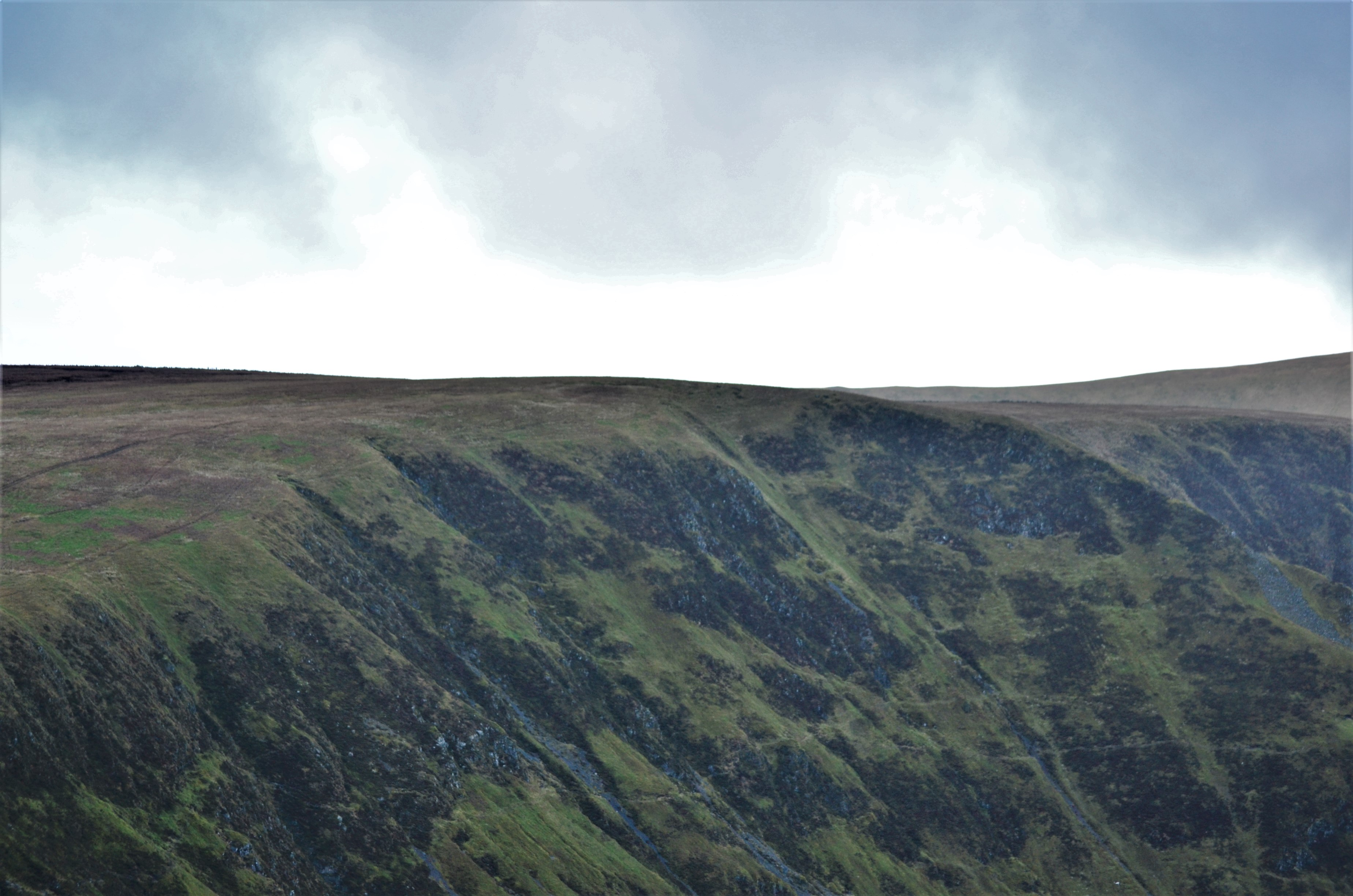

Highest point
- Elevation: 729.9 m (2,395 ft)
- Prominence: 36.3 m (119 ft)
- Listing: Tu,Sim,D,GT,DN

Naming
- English translation: English: Sweat Hill

Geography
- Location: Dumfries and Galloway, Scotland
- Parent range: Moffat Hills, Southern Uplands
- OS grid: NT 11848 11385
- Topo map: OS Landranger 78

Swatte Fell is a hill in the Moffat Hills range, part of the Southern Uplands of Scotland. It stands north of the town of Moffat in Dumfries and Galloway, south of its parent peak, Hart Fell. It is gently sloping on three sides of the hill, however the east ridge is steep and craggy and features a deep corrie known as Blackhope, from which a popular rock climb, the Coomb Craig ridge, originates, finishing near the summit, and was featured on the OS Explorer 330 map front cover. The normal route is from the southern ridge and can be extended to include a full loop of Blackhope, finishing on Saddle Yoke, known as the Hart Fell Horseshoe.

== Subsidiary SMC Summits ==
Summit	Height (m)	Listing
Nether Coomb Craig	724.2	DT,sSim
Falcon Craig	723.7	DT,sSim
