= Hart Fell =

Hill in the Moffat Hills range in Scotland

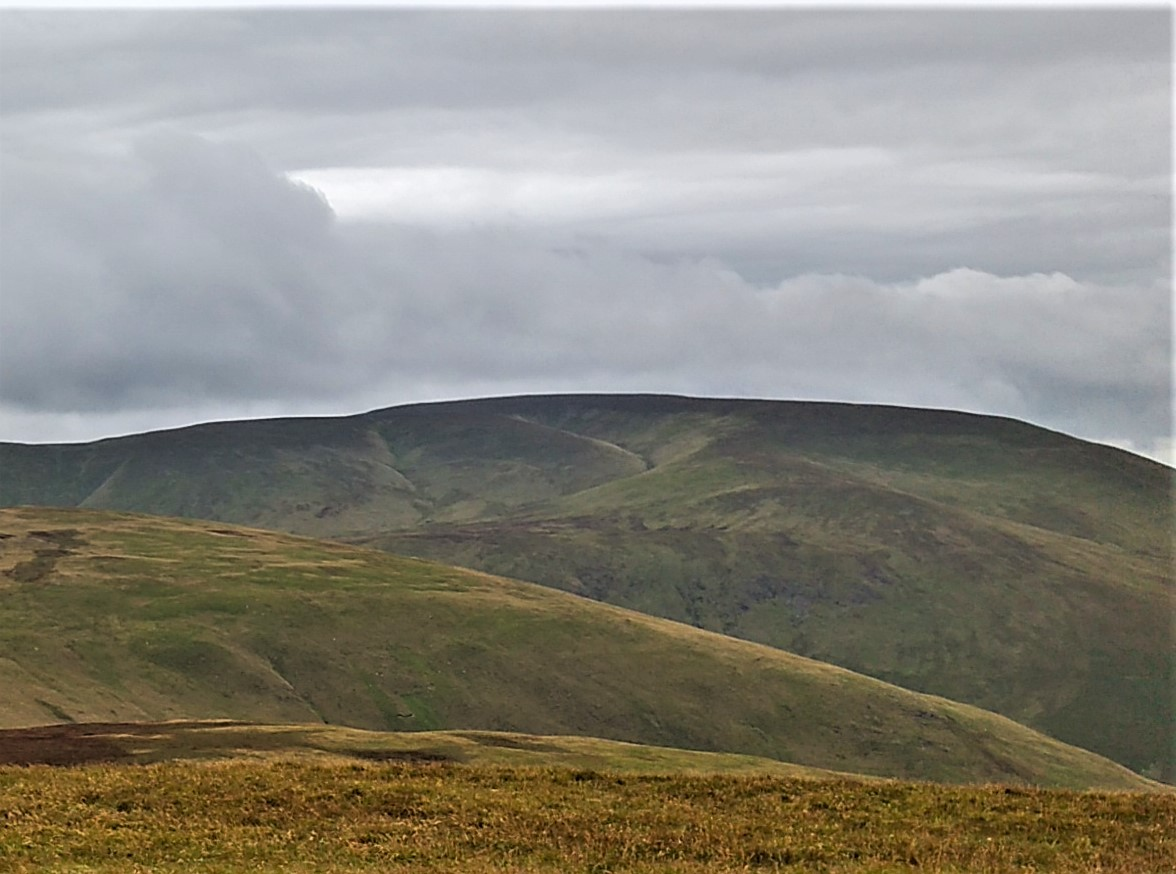

Highest point
- Elevation: 808 m (2,651 ft)
- Prominence: 200 m (660 ft)
- Listing: Ma,Hu,Tu,Sim,C,D,DN,Y
- Coordinates: 55°24′29″N 3°24′05″W

Naming
- English translation: English: Red Deer Hill

Geography
- Location: Dumfries and Galloway, Scottish Borders, Scotland
- Parent range: Moffat Hills, Southern Uplands
- OS grid: NT 11366 13570
- Topo map: OS Landranger 78

Hart Fell is a hill in the Moffat Hills range, part of the Southern Uplands of Scotland. It lies north of the town of Moffat on the border with the Scottish Borders and Dumfries and Galloway.

A broad, rolling hill, is visible from the M74 motorway in the west, parts of Dumfries and ranges to the east. Hart Fell is gently sloping on three sides of the hill, however the east ridge is steep and craggy and features a deep corrie known as Blackhope. The normal route is from the southern ridge, passing over Swatte Fell and can be extended to include a full loop of Blackhope, finishing on Saddle Yoke, known as the Hart Fell Horseshoe.
