= Grey Mare's Tail, Moffat Hills =

Waterfall and nature reserve in Scotland

Grey Mare's Tail
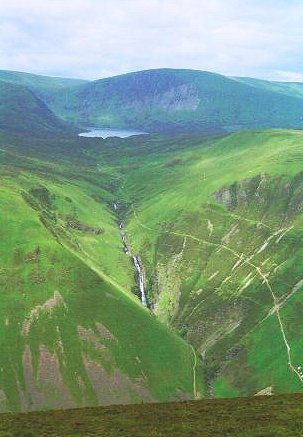
- Grey Mare's Tail beneath Loch Skeen
- Interactive map of Grey Mare's Tail
- Location: Near Moffat, southern Scotland
- Coordinates: 55°25′3″N 3°17′15″W
- Total height: 60-metre (200 ft)
- Watercourse: Tail Burn

Grey Mare's Tail is a 60-metre (200 ft) hanging valley waterfall near to Moffat in southern Scotland. The fall is produced by the Tail Burn flowing from Loch Skeen cascading into the Moffat Water in the lower valley below.

The surrounding area forms the Grey Mare's Tail Nature Reserve, owned by the National Trust for Scotland. The footpath from the valley floor up to Loch Skeen is one of the more popular walks in the area. Parking is also provided.

Grey Mare's Tail Nature Reserve is situated along the Moffat Water Valley in the heart of the Southern Uplands. This National Trust for Scotland property extends over 922 hectares and is characterised by a dramatic waterfall (the 5th highest in the UK), an upland loch Loch Skeen and White Coomb which rises to 821m and is one of the highest hills in Southern Scotland. The post-glacial landscape is an open mosaic of heather and rough grazing that includes 8 habitats of European importance and many plant species of international, national and regional significance. The reserve is botanically diverse, containing the richest assemblage of rare upland plants in Southern Scotland.

Recognised as a Special Area of Conservation, Grey Mare's Tail Nature Reserve is popular with hill walkers, botanists and wildlife enthusiasts.

There is also historical evidence of Iron Age settlers and the Covenanters who sought sanctuary here in the 17th century.

Notable animal species: peregrine falcon, ring ouzel, raven, vendace and wild goats.

Rare plants: many, including oblong woodsia, montane willows, and alpine saw-wort.

== See also ==
- List of waterfalls
- List of waterfalls in Scotland
- Dob's Linn
