= Loch Skeen =

Loch in Scotland

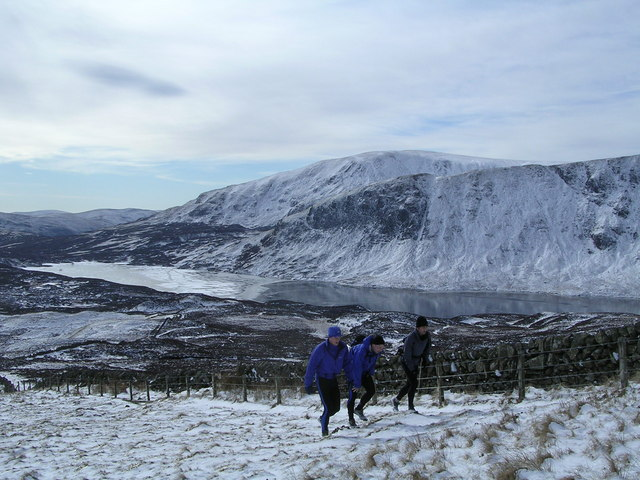

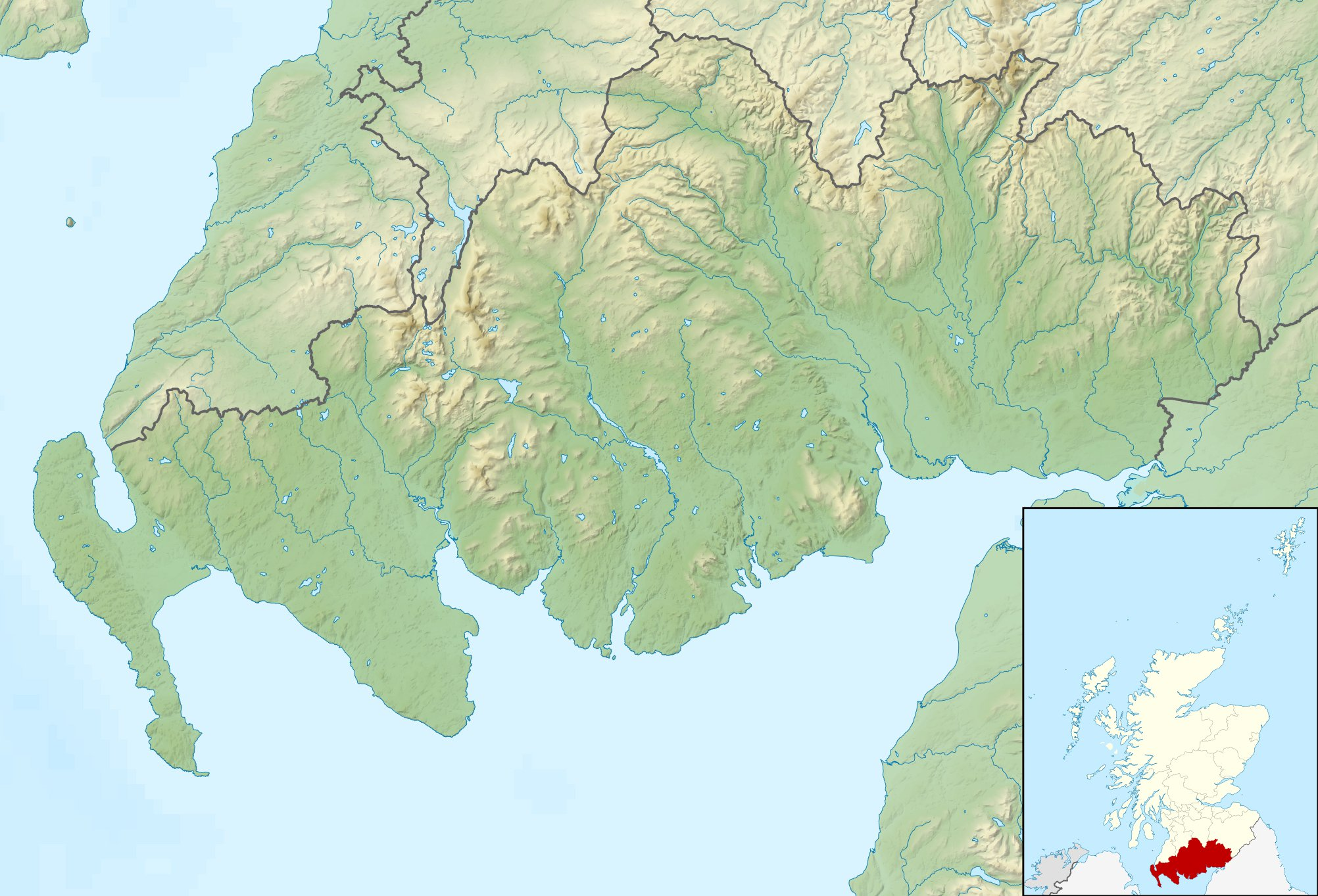
- Location within Dumfries and Galloway
- Location: Dumfries and Galloway
- Coordinates: 55°26′N 3°19′W
- Basin countries: United Kingdom
- Surface elevation: 510 m (1,670 ft)

Loch Skeen or Loch Skene is a loch in Dumfries and Galloway in the south of Scotland. It is located about 10 miles to the north-east of Moffat and feeds the 60-metre (200 ft) high Grey Mare's Tail waterfall. The area around Loch Skeen is popular with hikers, and the Daily Telegraph included Loch Skeen in a list of Britain's finest one-day and half-day walks. It is the highest loch in the Southern Uplands at approximately 510m.
