= Municipal Buildings, Dumfries =

Municipal Building in Dumfries, Scotland

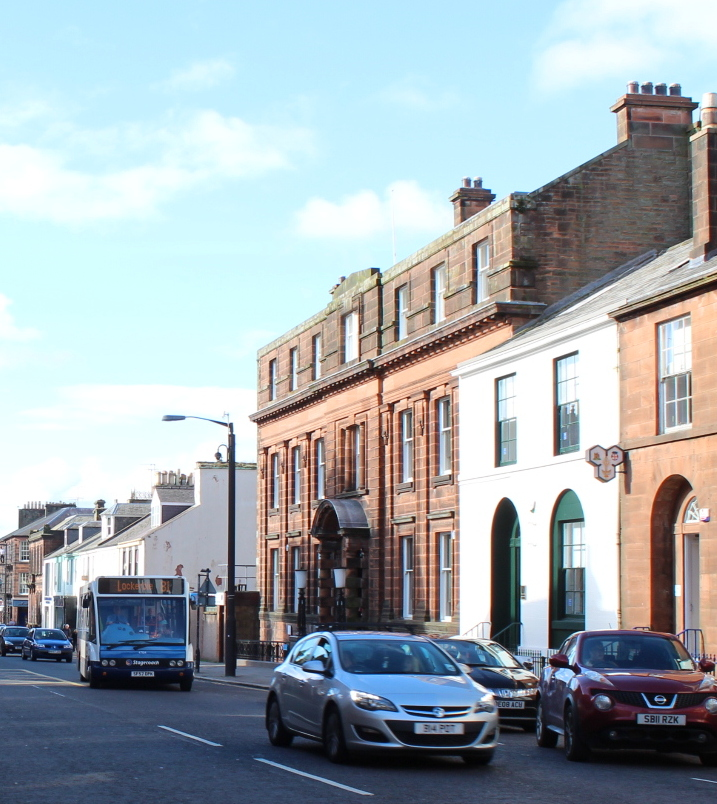
- Municipal Buildings, Dumfries

- Shown in Dumfries and Galloway
- 55.0701°N 3.6141°W
- Location: Buccleuch Street, Dumfries

History
- Built: 1932

Site notes
- Architect: James Carruthers
- Architectural style: Edwardian Baroque style

Listed Building – Category C(S)
- Official name: Buccleuch Street, Nithsdale District Council Offices
- Designated: 6 March 1981
- Reference no.: LB26099

The Municipal Buildings are based on the north side of Buccleuch Street, Dumfries, Dumfries and Galloway, Scotland. The structure, which was the headquarters of Dumfries Burgh Council, is a Category C listed building.

== History ==
The first municipal building in the town was a tolbooth in the High Street which dated back to the 15th century. It was demolished and replaced by a townhouse, known as the Midsteeple, which was completed in 1707.

After deciding that the Midsteeple was inadequate for their needs, civic leaders acquired the old courthouse on the north side of Buccleuch Street in 1866. (Note: The building on the north side of Buccleuch Street had originally been commissioned as a chapel by the theologian, Robert Haldane, in 1799. It was remodelled to a design by a Mr Gillespie in the neoclassical style for use as a courthouse in 1814, but fell vacant after the courts moved to a purpose-built courthouse on the south side of Buccleuch Street in 1866.) The old courthouse was then converted for municipal use as a town hall, to a design by John Johnstone, but it was badly damaged in a fire on 29 November 1908. Losses in the fire included fine portraits of King William and Queen Mary painted by Godfrey Kneller which had been presented to the town by the former local member of parliament, John Johnstone. However, a silver gun which had been presented by King James VI of Scotland to the Seven Incorporated Trades of Dumfries in 1598 survived the fire.

In the 1920s civic leaders decided to demolish the old building in Buccleuch Street and to replace it with a new structure on the same site. The new building was designed by James Carruthers of Glasgow in the Edwardian Baroque style, built in red ashlar stone extracted from a quarry at Locharbriggs and was officially opened by the Duke of Gloucester on 20 September 1932. The design involved a symmetrical main frontage with seven bays facing onto the Buccleuch Street; the central bay, which slightly projected forward, featured a doorway flanked by square Doric order columns supporting a curved canopy. The other bays on the ground floor as well as the bays on the first floor featured sash windows flanked by full-height pilasters supporting an entablature and a cornice. There were smaller sash windows on the second floor.

Internally, the principal room was the council chamber which was decorated to a design by Wylie and Lochhead with panelling which had originally been intended for the ocean liner RMS Queen Mary whose construction and internal fit-out had been delayed because of the Great Depression. A stained glass window was recovered from the previous building on the site and installed in a room on the ground floor at the rear of the building. The building continued to serve as the headquarters of Dumfries Burgh Council for much of the 20th century and became the meeting place of the enlarged Nithsdale District Council after it was formed in 1975. However, it ceased to be the local seat of government when Dumfries and Galloway Council became the new unitary authority for the area, with its offices at County Buildings in English Street, in 1996. The municipal buildings instead became the local provost's office and also the local registration office.

== See also ==
- List of listed buildings in Dumfries
