= 1974 Annandale and Eskdale District Council election =

Annandale and Eskdale District Council election

| 7 May 1974 | 1977 → |

All 16 seats to Annandale and Eskdale 9 seats needed for a majority
| | First party |
|---|---|
| | Ind |
| Party | Independent |
| Seats won | 16 |
| Popular vote | 4,788 |
| Percentage | 100.0% |
Council Leader after election
Independent

Elections to Annandale and Eskdale District Council were held on 7 May 1974, on the same day as the other Scottish local government elections. This was the first election to the district council following the implementation of the Local Government (Scotland) Act 1973.

The election used the 16 wards created by the Formation Electoral Arrangements in 1974. Each ward elected one councillor using first-past-the-post voting.

Annandale and Eskdale was a non-partisan district. No political party contested the election and all 16 seats were won by independents.

== Background ==
Prior to 1974, the area that was to become Annandale and Eskdale, included five of the seven burghs in County of Dumfries. The burghs – namely Annan, Langholm, Lochmaben, Lockerbie and Moffat – were all small burghs so the burgh council had limited powers which included some control over planning as well as local taxation, building control, housing, lighting and drainage with the rest of the local government responsibility falling to the county council.

Following the recommendations in the Wheatly Report, the old system of counties and burghs – which had resulted in a mishmash of local government areas in which some small burghs had larger populations but far fewer responsibilities than some large burghs and even counties – was to be replaced by a new system of regional and district councils. The Local Government (Scotland) Act 1973 implemented most of the recommendations in the Wheatly Report. The eastern part of the County of Dumfries which included the five burghs was placed into the Annandale and Eskdale district within the Dumfries and Galloway region.

== Results ==
1974 Annandale and Eskdale District Council election result
| Party | Seats | Gains | Losses | Net gain/loss | Seats % | Votes % | Votes | +/− |
|---|---|---|---|---|---|---|---|---|
| Independent | 16 | | | N/A | 100.0 | 100.0 | 4,788 | N/A |

== Ward results ==
Greenknowe
| Party | Candidate | Votes | % |
|---|---|---|---|
| Independent | G. Willacy | 378 | 56.8 |
| Independent | D.J. Ivison | 287 | 43.2 |

Galabank
| Party | Candidate | Votes | % |
|---|---|---|---|
| Independent | R.L. Stevenson | 472 | 71.1 |
| Independent | W. Graham | 192 | 28.9 |

Standalane
| Party | Candidate | Votes | % |
|---|---|---|---|
| Independent | J.L. Wallace | 445 | 78.8 |
| Independent | J. McKinna | 120 | 21.2 |

Brydekirk
| Party | Candidate | Votes | % |
|---|---|---|---|
| Independent | G. Proudfoot | Unopposed | |

Eastriggs
| Party | Candidate | Votes | % |
|---|---|---|---|
| Independent | J.W. Davidson | Unopposed | |

Gretna
| Party | Candidate | Votes | % |
|---|---|---|---|
| Independent | R.G. Greenhow | Unopposed | |

Langholm
| Party | Candidate | Votes | % |
|---|---|---|---|
| Independent | J. Grieve | 514 | 54 |
| Independent | Jean M. White | 438 | 46 |

Buccleuch
| Party | Candidate | Votes | % |
|---|---|---|---|
| Independent | R. Carruthers | 400 | 65.6 |
| Independent | Margaret E. Pool | 210 | 34.4 |

Kirtle
| Party | Candidate | Votes | % |
|---|---|---|---|
| Independent | J. Rae | Unopposed | |

Milk
| Party | Candidate | Votes | % |
|---|---|---|---|
| Independent | J.H.O Bridgeman | Unopposed | |

Moffat
| Party | Candidate | Votes | % |
|---|---|---|---|
| Independent | J. Cockayne | 326 | 44.2 |
| Independent | R. Chisholm | 240 | 32.5 |
| Independent | T.M. Sweetman | 172 | 23.3 |

Beattock
| Party | Candidate | Votes | % |
|---|---|---|---|
| Independent | C.M. Collins | 267 | 44.9 |
| Independent | I.G. Ramsay | 239 | 40.2 |
| Independent | D.C. Fell | 88 | 14.8 |

Cummertrees
| Party | Candidate | Votes | % |
|---|---|---|---|
| Independent | J.D. McKay | Unopposed | |

Lochmaben
| Party | Candidate | Votes | % |
|---|---|---|---|
| Independent | Margaret E. Wilson | Unopposed | |

Dryfe
| Party | Candidate | Votes | % |
|---|---|---|---|
| Independent | Sir W.E. Jardine | Unopposed | |

Lockerbie
| Party | Candidate | Votes | % |
|---|---|---|---|
| Independent | P. Cameron | Unopposed | |

== Aftermath ==
Annandale and Eskdale, like the other three districts in Dumfries and Galloway, was non-partisan and controlled by Independent candidates who won all 16 seats. Independents also controlled the regional council which held its first election on the same day. Across Scotland, Labour won the most votes, the most seats and the most councils of any party.
