= 1980 Annandale and Eskdale District Council election =

1980 Scottish local government election

← 1977	1 May 1980	1984 →

All 16 Seats to Annandale and Eskdale District Council 9 seats needed for a majority
- Turnout: 36%
	First party
Party	Independent
Last election	16 seats, 100.0%
Seats after	16
Seat change	Steady
Popular vote	1,807
Percentage	100.0%
Swing	Steady

The 1980 Annandale and Eskdale District Council election took place on 1 May 1980 alongside elections to the councils of Scotland's various other districts. Held under the Local Government (Scotland) Act 1973. Annandale and Eskdale was also under the regional council of Dumfries and Galloway.

As with the previous elections, no political parties fielded any candidates.

There were only 3 contested seats.

== Results ==
1980 Annandale and Eskdale District Council election result
Party	Seats	Gains	Losses	Net gain/loss	Seats %	Votes %	Votes	+/−
Independent	16	0	0	Steady	100.0	100.0	1,807	Steady

== Results by Ward ==
Greenknowe
Party	Candidate	Votes	%	±%
Independent	G. Willacy	508	55.9%	N/A
Independent	R.J. Brodie	397	43.7%	N/A

Galabank
Party	Candidate	Votes	%	±%
Independent	J.H. Trodden	Uncontested	Uncontested	N/A

Standalane
Party	Candidate	Votes	%	±%
Independent	J. Johnston	371	67.9%	−24.9%
Independent	E. Dirom	174	31.9%	N/A

Springbells/Creca
Party	Candidate	Votes	%	±%
Independent	G. Proudfoot	Uncontested	Uncontested	N/A

Eastriggs
Party	Candidate	Votes	%	±%
Independent	J.W. Davidson	Uncontested	Uncontested	N/A

Gretna
Party	Candidate	Votes	%	±%
Independent	R.G. Greenhow	Uncontested	Uncontested	N/A

Langholm
Party	Candidate	Votes	%	±%
Independent	J. Grieve	Uncontested	Uncontested	N/A

Buccleuch
Party	Candidate	Votes	%	±%
Independent	G.M. Flitcroft	184	50.5%	N/A
Independent	R.W. Mowbray	173	47.5%	Defeated

Kirtle
Party	Candidate	Votes	%	±%
Independent	J. Rae	Uncontested	Uncontested	N/A

Milk
Party	Candidate	Votes	%	±%
Independent	W.A. Rutherford	Uncontested	Uncontested	N/A

Moffat
Party	Candidate	Votes	%	±%
Independent	W.R. Scott	Uncontested	Uncontested	N/A

Beattock
Party	Candidate	Votes	%	±%
Independent	I.G. Ramsay	Uncontested	Uncontested	N/A

Cummertrees
Party	Candidate	Votes	%	±%
Independent	J.D. McKay	Uncontested	Uncontested	N/A

Lochmaben
Party	Candidate	Votes	%	±%
Independent	Ms. M.E. Wilson	Uncontested	Uncontested	N/A

Dryfe
Party	Candidate	Votes	%	±%
Independent	Sir W.E. Jardine	Uncontested	Uncontested	N/A

Lockerbie
Party	Candidate	Votes	%	±%
Independent	P. Cameron	Uncontested	Uncontested	N/A
