= Annan Town Hall =

Municipal building in Annan, Scotland

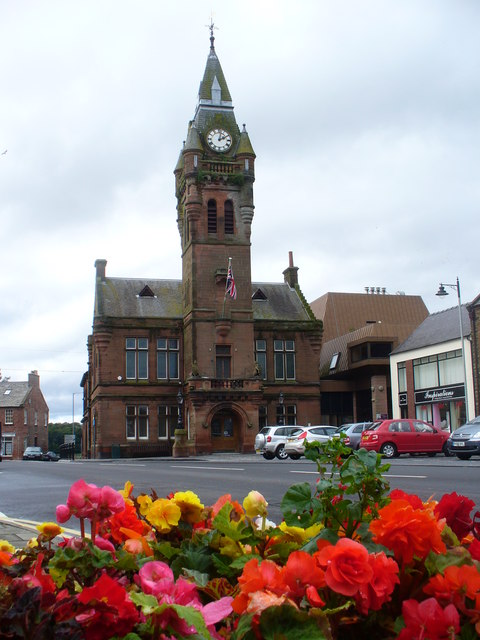
- Annan Town Hall

- Shown in Dumfries and Galloway
- 54.9872°N 3.2646°W
- Location: High Street, Annan

History
- Built: 1878

Site notes
- Architect: Peter Smith
- Architectural style: Scottish baronial style

Listed Building – Category B
- Official name: High Street, Town hall and freestanding lamps
- Designated: 3 August 1971
- Reference no.: LB21097

Annan Town Hall is a municipal building in the High Street in Annan, Dumfries and Galloway, Scotland. The structure, which accommodates the local library and is also used as a venue for the provision of local services, is a Category B listed building.

== History ==
The first municipal building in the town was a tolbooth which dated back at least to the early 17th century: a clock, a bell and a steeple were added in 1740. Debtors were typically incarcerated in the prison cells there during the 18th and 19th centuries. However, by the mid-19th century it had become dilapidated and it was demolished in 1875.

The current building was designed by Peter Smith of Glasgow in the Scottish baronial style, built in red sandstone from Corsehill Quarry and was completed in 1878. The design involved a symmetrical main frontage with five bays facing east along the High Street. The central bay, which projected forward, contained a four-stage tower. There was a wide doorway with a round headed hood mould in the first stage, a French door with a rectangular fanlight and a stone balustraded balcony in the second stage, a vacant pedestal intended for a statue with a small canopy above in the third stage, and a belfry with louvres and bartizans in the fourth stage; the tower was surmounted by a spire. The outer bays were fenestrated with cross windows on both floors. Internally, the principal room was the council chamber on the first floor. The stained glasswork was carried out by Adam & Small and the clock was designed, manufactured and installed by Potts of Leeds in around 1900.

A stone carved with the words "Robert de Brus, Count of Carrick and Seigneur of Annan", which had originated from the 12th century Mote of Annan was removed to Devon where it was found in 1925. The stone recalled the Bruce dynasty who were Lords of Annandale; it was subsequently returned to Annan and installed in the council chamber in the town hall in 1927.

The town hall continued to serve as the meeting place of the burgh council for much of the 20th century. The burgh council was abolished in 1975. The burgh council's successor, Annandale and Eskdale District Council, also based itself at the town hall. It built a large extension to the north of the building alongside Battery Street, which it called the District Council Chambers, with its main entrance to the right of the old town hall facing the High Street. Since the district council's abolition in 1996 the modern building has been an area office of Dumfries and Galloway Council. The council also continues to use the town hall for meetings of the Annandale and Eskdale area committee.

In 2007, a local businesswoman, Janette Weild, launched an initiative to commission a statue of Robert the Bruce to place on the vacant pedestal on the third stage of the tower. The statue, which took the form of the Scottish king holding the Declaration of Arbroath in one hand and a sword in the other, was designed by Andrew Brown, cast in bronze at a cost of £43,000 and was installed on the pedestal in the presence of Charles Edward Bruce, Lord Bruce, the son and heir of Andrew Bruce, 11th Earl of Elgin, in January 2010. The local library relocated from Charles Street into the town hall in December 2017.

Works of art in the town hall include a painting by William Ewart Lockhart depicting two children.

== See also ==
- List of listed buildings in Annan, Dumfries and Galloway
