= 1977 Annandale and Eskdale District Council election =

1977 Scottish local government election

← 1974	3 May 1977	1980 →

All 16 Seats to Annandale and Eskdale District District Council
- Turnout: 39.9%
	First party
Party	Independent
Last election	16 seats, 100.0%
Seats won	16
Seat change	Steady
Popular vote	4,494
Percentage	100.0%
Swing	Steady

The 1977 Annandale and Eskdale District Council election was part of the 1977 Scottish local elections. This was the second election held under the new double-tiered system of the Local Government (Scotland) Act 1973. Annandale and Eskdale is an area of Dumfries and Galloway and was covered by the Annandale and Eskdale District Council and the Dumfries and Galloway Regional Council.

As with the last election, political parties didn't field any candidates in this election.

== Results ==
1977 Annandale and Eskdale District Council election result
Party	Seats	Gains	Losses	Net gain/loss	Seats %	Votes %	Votes	+/−
Independent	16	0	0	Steady	100.0	100.0	4,494	Steady

== Results by Ward ==
Greenknowe
Party	Candidate	Votes	%	±%
Independent	G. Willacy	Uncontested	Uncontested	N/A

Galabank
Party	Candidate	Votes	%	±%
Independent	R. L. Stevenson	Unopposed	Unopposed	N/A

Standalane
Party	Candidate	Votes	%	±%
Independent	J. Johnston	449	92.8%	N/A
Independent	Ms. M.A. McCubbin	35	7.2%	N/A

Brydekirk
Party	Candidate	Votes	%	±%
Independent	G. Proudfoot	Uncontested	Uncontested	N/A

Eastriggs
Party	Candidate	Votes	%	±%
Independent	Ms. J. Grace	390	55.6%	N/A
Independent	J.W. Davidson	312	44.4%	Defeated

Gretna
Party	Candidate	Votes	%	±%
Independent	R.G.G Greenhow	Uncontested	Uncontested	N/A

Langholm
Party	Candidate	Votes	%	±%
Independent	J. Grieve	540	75.5%	+21.5%
Independent	A. Porteous	175	24.5%	N/A

Buccleuch
Party	Candidate	Votes	%	±%
Independent	R.W. Mowbray	Unopposed	Unopposed	N/A

Kirktle
Party	Candidate	Votes	%	±%
Independent	J. Rae	408	77.9%	N/A
Independent	R. McCubbin	116	22.1%	N/A

Milk
Party	Candidate	Votes	%	±%
Independent	W.A. Rutherford	392	55.4%	N/A
Independent	J.W. Shaw	316	44.6%	N/A

Moffat
Party	Candidate	Votes	%	±%
Independent	W.R Scott	401	53%	N/A
Independent	J. Cockayne	356	47%	2.8%

Beattock
Party	Candidate	Votes	%	±%
Independent	I.G. Ramsay	328	54.3%	−14.1%
Independent	C.M. Collins	276	45.7%	+0.8%

Cummertrees
Party	Candidate	Votes	%	±%
Independent	J.D. McKay	Unopposed	Unopposed	N/A

Lochmaben
Party	Candidate	Votes	%	±%
Independent	Ms. M.E. Wilson	Unopposed	Unopposed	N/A

Dryfe
Party	Candidate	Votes	%	±%
Independent	Sir W.E. Jardine	Unopposed	Unopposed	N/A

Lockerbie
Party	Candidate	Votes	%	±%
Independent	P. Cameron	Unopposed	Unopposed	N/A
