= 1984 Annandale and Eskdale District Council election =

1984 Scottish local government election

← 1980	3 May 1984	1988 →

All 16 Seats for Annandale and Eskdale District Council
- Turnout: 44.5%
	First party	Second party
Party	Independent	Alliance
Last election	16 seats, 100.0%	Did not contest
Seats won	12	4
Seat change	▼4	▲4
Popular vote	4,694	2,219
Percentage	55.6%	26.3%
Swing	▼44.4%	New

The 1984 Annandale and Eskdale District Council election was the fourth election to Annandale and Eskdale District Council. The district council was the lower tier of local government in the area, below Dumfries and Galloway Regional Council.

This was the first election to Annandale and Eskdale District council where political parties fielded candidates. A total of 11 wards were contested, which is a significant increase from last election where only 3 wards were contested.

== Results ==
1984 Annandale and Eskdale District Council election result
Party	Seats	Gains	Losses	Net gain/loss	Seats %	Votes %	Votes	+/−
Independent	12	0	4	▼4	75.0	55.6	4,694	▼44.4
Alliance	4	4	0	▲4	25.0	26.3	2,219	New
Labour	0	0	0	Steady	0.0	10.8	908	New
SNP	0	0	0	Steady	0.0	7.3	619	New

== Results by ward ==
Greenknowe
Party	Candidate	Votes	%	±%
Independent	G. Willacy	533	53.5%	−2.4%
Labour	R.L. Brown	462	46.3%	N/A

Galabank
Party	Candidate	Votes	%	±%
Independent	W.H. Grieve	270	43.7%	N/A
Labour	A.M. Telford	267	43.2%	N/A
Independent	R. McCubbin	80	12.7%	N/A

Standalane
Party	Candidate	Votes	%	±%
Liberal	F. Park	519	61.3%	N/A
Independent	J. Johnston	328	38.7%	−29.2%

Springbells/Creca
Party	Candidate	Votes	%	±%
Independent	S. Adams	439	67.4%	N/A
Independent	G. Proudfoot	132	20.3%	Defeated
Labour	E.G.H. Blackmore	79	12.1%	N/A

Eastriggs
Party	Candidate	Votes	%	±%
Liberal	R.J. Brodie	Unopposed	Unopposed	N/A

Gretna
Party	Candidate	Votes	%	±%
Independent	R.G. Greenhow	Unopposed	Unopposed	N/A

Langholm
Party	Candidate	Votes	%	±%
Independent	J.W. Bruce	Unopposed	Unopposed	N/A

Buccleuch
Party	Candidate	Votes	%	±%
Independent	G.M. Flitcroft	Unopposed	Unopposed	N/A

Kirtle
Party	Candidate	Votes	%	±%
Independent	J. Rae	419	54.9%	N/A
Liberal	E.T.A. Sinclair	341	44.7%	N/A

Milk
Party	Candidate	Votes	%	±%
Independent	W.A. Rutherford	474	82.1%	N/A
Labour	D. Lindsay	100	17.3%	N/A

Moffat
Party	Candidate	Votes	%	±%
Independent	J.S. Richardson	629	55.3%	N/A
SNP	W.P. Farrell	507	44.6%	N/A

Beattock
Party	Candidate	Votes	%	±%
Liberal	J.D. Stevenson	366	76.1%	N/A
SNP	W.G. Millar	112	23.3%	N/A

Cummertrees
Party	Candidate	Votes	%	±%
Independent	T. Gates	394	64.3%	N/A
Independent	W.J. Ellis	219	35.7%	N/A

Lochmaben
Party	Candidate	Votes	%	±%
Independent	M.E. Wilson	Unopposed	Unopposed	N/A

Dryfe
Party	Candidate	Votes	%	±%
SDP	D.G. Mundell	669	73.9%	N/A
Independent	W.E. Jardine	235	26%	Defeated

Lockerbie
Party	Candidate	Votes	%	±%
Independent	P. Cameron	543	62.6%	N/A
Liberal	H.A.T. Young	324	37.3%	N/A
