= Midsteeple, Dumfries =

Municipal building in Dumfries, Scotland

Midsteeple
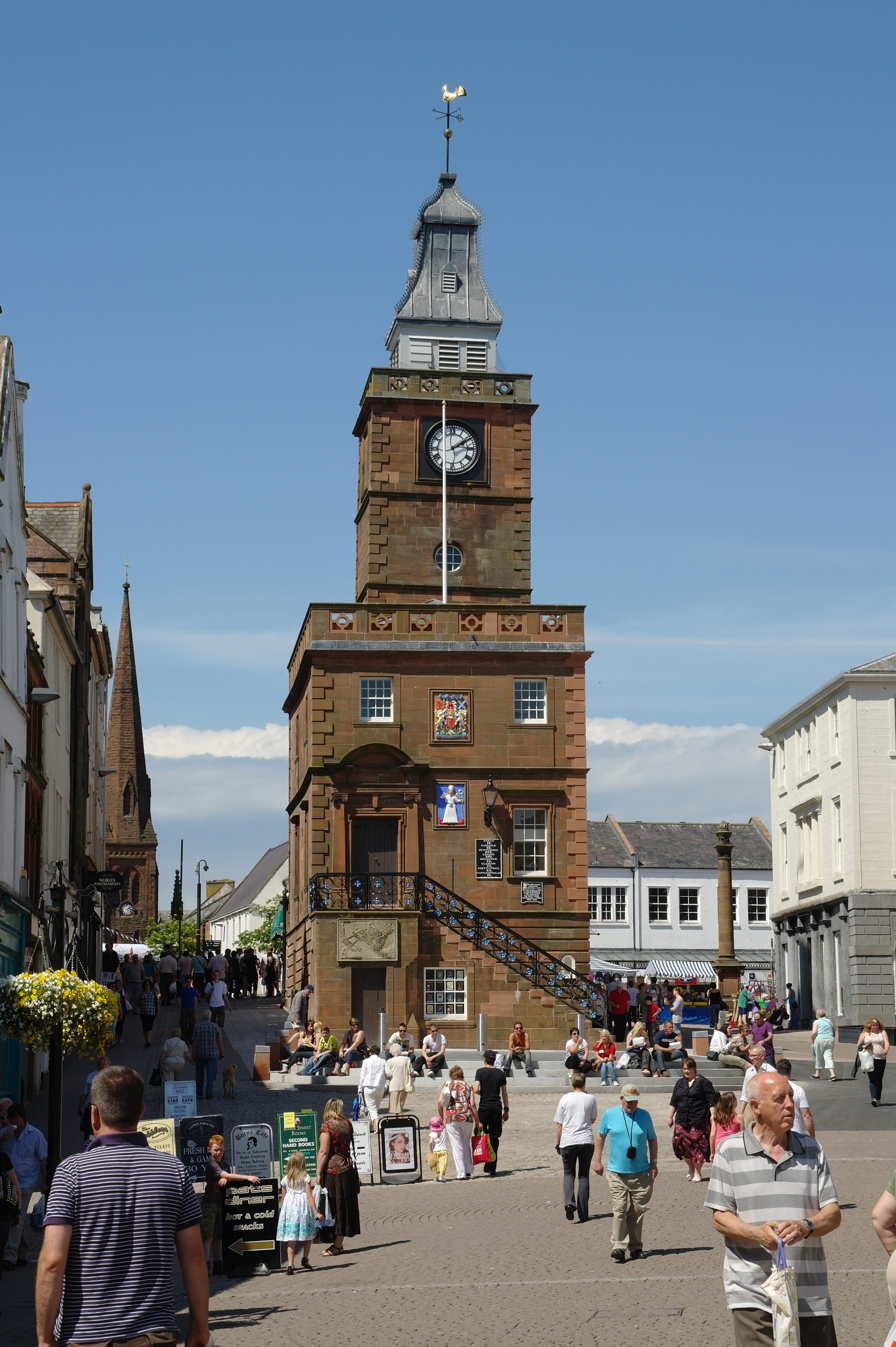
- Midsteeple

- Shown in Dumfries and Galloway
- 55.0688°N 3.6108°W
- Location: High Street, Dumfries

History
- Built: 1707

Site notes
- Architect: Tobias Bachop
- Architectural style: Scottish Renaissance style

Listed Building – Category A
- Official name: High Street, Midsteeple
- Designated: 11 July 1961
- Reference no.: LB26215

The Midsteeple is a municipal building in the High Street in Dumfries, Dumfries and Galloway, Scotland. The structure, which is used as a ticket office and a meeting place, is a Category A listed building.

== History ==
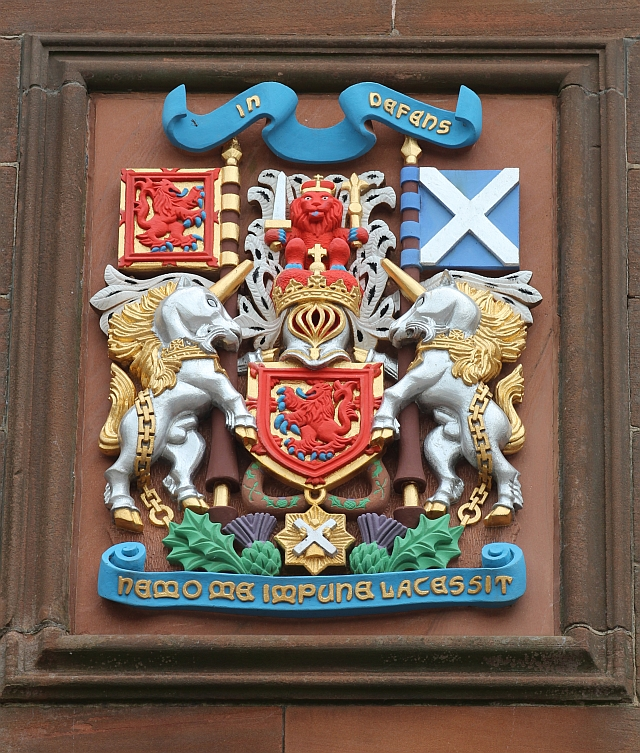
The Royal arms of Scotland on the Midsteeple

The first municipal building in the town was a tolbooth on the east side of the High Street which dated back to the 15th century. It had vaulted cellars in the basement, shops on the ground floor and an assembly hall together with a lock-up on the first floor. After securing a share of the Scottish customs and excise duties in 1697, burgh leaders decided to apply this sum to erecting a new townhouse. The foundation stone for the new building, known as the Midsteeple, was laid on 30 May 1705. It was designed by Tobias Bachop of Alloa, based on an outline plan by John Moffat of Liverpool, built in ashlar stone and was completed in 1707.

The design involved an asymmetrical main frontage with two bays facing down the High Street; there was an external staircase leading up to a doorway, which was flanked by narrow pilasters supporting a plain entablature, in the left-hand bay on the first floor. The right-hand bay on the first floor contained a sash window and the second floor was fenestrated by square sash windows. At roof level there was a parapet and in the northeast corner there was a six-stage clock tower with an oculus in the fifth stage and clock faces in the sixth stage: it was surmounted by an ogive-shaped cupola. An elaborate wrought iron railing was designed and manufactured for the external staircase by an Edinburgh blacksmith, Patrick Sibbald. Internally, the principal rooms were a guardhouse on the ground floor, the burgh council chamber on the first floor and a series of prison cells on the second floor.

The poet, Robert Burns, who lived nearby at Ellisland Farm, referred to the "Great Fear" of a French invasion of the UK as well as the Midsteeple when he suggested that French soldiers and their allies "Shall hang as high's the steeple" in his ballad "Does haughtly Gail invasion threat?" written in 1795. Following his death, he was given the honour of having his body laid out in the burgh council chamber of the Midsteeple prior to his funeral in July 1796.

The doorway on the first floor was enhanced by Doric order pilasters and a new entablature in 1830. In the mid-19th century, the burgh leaders decided that the Midsteeple had become inadequate for their needs and relocated to the old courthouse on the north side of Buccleuch Street in 1866. (Note: The courthouse was demolished and replaced by the municipal buildings in the 1920s.) The Midsteeple was subsequently converted for retail use on the ground floor and for warehouse use on the first floor. Further improvements were made to a design by James Barbour of the architectural firm, Barbour & Bowie, in 1910. The work involved re-casing the outside of the building in polished stone and installing Ionic order pilasters and a more ornate entablature around the first floor doorway. Structural improvements were made to the building in 1973 and an extensive programme of refurbishment works, carried out at a cost of £1.35 million, was completed in 2009. The works included the restoration and repainting of plaques on the front of the building depicting the Royal arms of Scotland and St Michael slaying a dragon. A box office, selling tickets for venues around the town, was subsequently established on the ground floor.

In July 2022, the Scottish Government minister, Tom Arthur, confirmed funding of £3.4 million, alongside other public bodies, for the restoration of various buildings around the Midsteeple, referred to collectively as "the Midsteeple Quarter", which had been brought into community ownership.

== See also ==
- List of listed buildings in Dumfries
- List of Category A listed buildings in Dumfries and Galloway
