= List of listed buildings in Dumfries =

This is a list of listed buildings in the parish of Dumfries in Dumfries and Galloway, Scotland.

== List ==
| Name | Location | Date listed | Grid ref. (Note: Sometimes known as OSGB36, the grid reference (where provided) is based on the British national grid reference system used by the Ordnance Survey. • "Guide to National Grid". Ordnance Survey. • "Get-a-map". Ordnance Survey.) | Geo-coordinates | Notes | LB number (Note: Historic Environment Scotland assign a unique alphanumeric identifier to each designated site in Scotland, for listed buildings this always begins with "LB", for example "LB12345".) | Image |
|---|---|---|---|---|---|---|---|
| Newbridge, Roadbridge Over Cluden Water (On Former Line Of A76) | | | | 55°05′43″N 3°38′55″W | Category B | 26290 | Upload Photo |
| Newbridge, Embassy Hotel, Bothy At Former Stables | | | | 55°05′42″N 3°39′00″W | Category B | 26294 | Upload Photo |
| Nith Bank, Nith Bank Hospital, Terrace, North Lodge And Detached Blocks To North East | | | | 55°03′45″N 3°36′08″W | Category B | 26295 | Upload Photo |
| Nith Bank, Beechwood Bank | | | | 55°03′41″N 3°36′13″W | Category C(S) | 26302 | Upload Photo |
| Nith Bank, The Grange And Gatepiers | | | | 55°03′40″N 3°36′13″W | Category C(S) | 26303 | Upload Photo |
| 8-22 Nunholm Road (Even Numbers) Albany Place | | | | 55°04′36″N 3°36′27″W | Category B | 26309 | Upload Photo |
| 28 Queen Street | | | | 55°04′05″N 3°36′30″W | Category B | 26314 | Upload Photo |
| 109 Queensberry Street, (Both Ranges) Opus And Patties And Bracken Fabrics | | | | 55°04′13″N 3°36′41″W | Category B | 26319 | Upload Photo |
| 52 Queensberry Street And 3 Great King Street, Bank Of Scotland | | | | 55°04′10″N 3°36′38″W | Category B | 26321 | Upload Photo |
| 84-94 Queensberry Street (Even Numbers) And Courtyard Buildings To Rear | | | | 55°04′12″N 3°36′39″W | Category B | 26323 | Upload Photo |
| 136-142 Queensberry Street (Even Numbers) And 2 Academy Street | | | | 55°04′15″N 3°36′41″W | Category C(S) | 26325 | Upload Photo |
| St Michael's Bridge (Over River Nith) | | | | 55°03′51″N 3°36′36″W | Category B | 26334 | Upload another image |
| Shakespeare Street, Towers Of Old St Andrews Cathedral | | | | 55°04′07″N 3°36′26″W | Category B | 26342 | Upload Photo |
| Station Road, Dumfries Station, Including Platforms, Lamp Standards, Footbridge, Chargeman's Hut, Railings, Gates And Gatepiers | | | | 55°04′19″N 3°36′15″W | Category B | 26343 | Upload another image See more images |
| 1-13 Terregles Street And 2 Laurieknowe | | | | 55°04′06″N 3°37′14″W | Category C(S) | 26345 | Upload Photo |
| Troqueer Road, Rosefield Mills | | | | 55°03′47″N 3°36′32″W | Category B | 26348 | Upload another image |
| 1-8 Victoria Terrace, (Inclusive Numbers) And 1 Moffat Road And Garden Terrace Balustrades | | | | 55°04′23″N 3°36′03″W | Category B | 26352 | Upload Photo |
| Whitesands, Suspension Foot Bridge | | | | 55°03′54″N 3°36′37″W | Category B | 26355 | Upload another image |
| Glencaple Road, Castledykes View And Drybridge Over Wallace's Loaning, Garden Walls And Gatepiers | | | | 55°03′29″N 3°36′09″W | Category B | 26212 | Upload another image |
| 55 High Street | | | | 55°04′03″N 3°36′37″W | Category C(S) | 26216 | Upload Photo |
| 117 High Street | | | | 55°04′07″N 3°36′39″W | Category C(S) | 26224 | Upload Photo |
| 119, 121 High Street | | | | 55°04′07″N 3°36′39″W | Category C(S) | 26225 | Upload Photo |
| 96, 98, 100 High Street | | | | 55°04′06″N 3°36′36″W | Category B | 26231 | Upload Photo |
| 136, 140 High Street/16, 17 Queensberry Square, Former Trades Hall | | | | 55°04′08″N 3°36′38″W | Category A | 26234 | Upload Photo |
| 178, 180, 182, 184 Irish Street And 56 Buccleuch Street | | | | 55°04′12″N 3°36′50″W | Category C(S) | 26253 | Upload Photo |
| Johnstone Park, 1-10 Carruthers Cottages (Inclusive Numbers) | | | | 55°03′41″N 3°36′03″W | Category B | 26256 | Upload Photo |
| 4-12 Laurieknowe (Even Numbers) | | | | 55°04′05″N 3°37′14″W | Category B | 26260 | Upload Photo |
| 42, 44, 46 Laurieknowe | | | | 55°03′59″N 3°37′23″W | Category C(S) | 26267 | Upload Photo |
| 52, 54, 56 Laurieknowe | | | | 55°03′59″N 3°37′24″W | Category C(S) | 26269 | Upload Photo |
| 98, 104, 106, 112 Loreburn Street | | | | 55°04′15″N 3°36′36″W | Category C(S) | 26272 | Upload Photo |
| Loreburn Street, Loreburn United Free Church | | | | 55°04′15″N 3°36′36″W | Category C(S) | 26273 | Upload Photo |
| 19, 21, 23, 25 Lovers Walk (And Gatepiers) | | | | 55°04′21″N 3°36′27″W | Category C(S) | 26276 | Upload Photo |
| Maxwell Street St Benedict's Convent | | | | 55°03′57″N 3°37′10″W | Category B | 26281 | Upload Photo |
| 53 Moffat Road, Greystone And Stables And Gatepiers | | | | 55°04′32″N 3°35′59″W | Category B | 26285 | Upload Photo |
| 12 Castle Street | | | | 55°04′13″N 3°36′47″W | Category B | 26121 | Upload Photo |
| 14-24 Castle Street (Even Numbers) | | | | 55°04′14″N 3°36′47″W | Category A | 26122 | Upload Photo |
| 1 Charlotte Street | | | | 55°04′11″N 3°36′56″W | Category B | 26125 | Upload Photo |
| Church Street, 1-5 Corberry Terrace (Inclusive) | | | | 55°03′54″N 3°36′50″W | Category B | 26139 | Upload Photo |
| Craigs Road, St Joseph's College, Gatepiers Near Mount St Michael's | | | | 55°03′48″N 3°36′06″W | Category B | 26145 | Upload Photo |
| Craigs Road, St Joseph's College, Chapel And Freestanding Lamp | | | | 55°03′50″N 3°36′01″W | Category B | 26148 | Upload Photo |
| Dock Park Bandstand | | | | 55°03′45″N 3°36′22″W | Category B | 26153 | Upload another image |
| 2 Edinburgh Road, Elmbank Lodge And Gatepiers | | | | 55°04′22″N 3°36′33″W | Category B | 26155 | Upload Photo |
| 1, 3 English Street And 84-94 High Street (Even Numbers) | | | | 55°04′05″N 3°36′36″W | Category B | 26160 | Upload Photo |
| 9, 9A English Street | | | | 55°04′06″N 3°36′35″W | Category C(S) | 26162 | Upload Photo |
| 33, 35, 37 English Street | | | | 55°04′07″N 3°36′33″W | Category C(S) | 26166 | Upload Photo |
| Dobie's Wynd To Rear Of 33-7 English Street | | | | 55°04′07″N 3°36′34″W | Category C(S) | 26167 | Upload Photo |
| 47, 49, 51, 53 English Street Corner Of Loreburn Street | | | | 55°04′07″N 3°36′32″W | Category B | 26169 | Upload Photo |
| 8 English Street, Bank Of Scotland | | | | 55°04′05″N 3°36′34″W | Category B | 26176 | Upload Photo |
| 20, 22 English Street And 1-7 Queen Street (Odd Numbers) | | | | 55°04′06″N 3°36′33″W | Category C(S) | 26180 | Upload Photo |
| 17, 19, 21 Friars Vennel | | | | 55°04′08″N 3°36′52″W | Category C(S) | 26191 | Upload Photo |
| 71, 75 Friars Vennel And 161 Irish Street | | | | 55°04′10″N 3°36′49″W | Category B | 26192 | Upload Photo |
| 30-36 Friars Vennel, (Even Numbers) | | | | 55°04′08″N 3°36′51″W | Category C(S) | 26194 | Upload Photo |
| 35, 37 George Street | | | | 55°04′15″N 3°36′52″W | Category B | 26202 | Upload Photo |
| Academy Street, Dumfries Academy Including 1936 Addition, Link Building, Boundary Wall, Gatepiers, Steps And Terraces | | | | 55°04′19″N 3°36′40″W | Category B | 26077 | Upload another image |
| 6 And A Half-10 Assembly Street (Even Nos) | | | | 55°04′02″N 3°36′38″W | Category C(S) | 26081 | Upload Photo |
| 17, 19 Bank Street, Royal Bank Of Scotland | | | | 55°04′05″N 3°36′43″W | Category B | 26084 | Upload Photo |
| 23 Bank Street 96 Irish Street Clydesdale Bank | | | | 55°04′05″N 3°36′42″W | Category B | 26085 | Upload Photo |
| 10 Bank Street | | | | 55°04′04″N 3°36′43″W | Category C(S) | 26089 | Upload Photo |
| Bankend Road, St Michael's (Formerly St Michael's Manse) | | | | 55°03′38″N 3°36′05″W | Category B | 26093 | Upload Photo |
| 21, 23, 25, 27 Buccleuch Street | | | | 55°04′11″N 3°36′57″W | Category B | 26098 | Upload Photo |
| Buccleuch Street, Nithsdale District Offices | | | | 55°04′13″N 3°36′51″W | Category C(S) | 26099 | Upload another image |
| 10, 12 Buccleuch Street | | | | 55°04′10″N 3°36′58″W | Category C(S) | 26104 | Upload Photo |
| 42, 44 Buccleuch Street | | | | 55°04′11″N 3°36′53″W | Category B | 26109 | Upload Photo |
| 25-37 Castle Street (Odd Numbers) | | | | 55°04′14″N 3°36′49″W | Category A | 26118 | Upload Photo |
| The Crichton, Eskdale House | | | | 55°02′51″N 3°35′39″W | Category C(S) | 6700 | Upload Photo |
| The Crichton, Hestan House | | | | 55°02′56″N 3°35′35″W | Category C(S) | 6702 | Upload Photo |
| The Crichton, Kindar And Merrick | | | | 55°02′59″N 3°35′31″W | Category C(S) | 6703 | Upload Photo |
| Ladyfield West (Formerly Hannayfield) | | | | 55°03′13″N 3°36′05″W | Category A | 3829 | Upload Photo |
| Midpark (Crichton Farm) | | | | 55°03′09″N 3°35′18″W | Category C(S) | 3833 | Upload Photo |
| Craigs House | | | | 55°03′20″N 3°34′24″W | Category B | 3838 | Upload Photo |
| Heathall Uniroyal Factory | | | | 55°05′45″N 3°35′06″W | Category B | 3819 | Upload Photo |
| The Crichton, Boundary Walls, Railings, Gatepiers And Gates Along Bankend Road And Glencaple Road | | | | 55°02′54″N 3°35′51″W | Category C(S) | 50999 | Upload Photo |
| 24 Nith Place | | | | 55°04′00″N 3°36′34″W | Category A | 26305 | Upload Photo |
| 30, 34 Queen Street | | | | 55°04′05″N 3°36′30″W | Category B | 26315 | Upload Photo |
| 7 And A Half St Andrew Street | | | | 55°04′13″N 3°36′43″W | Category B | 26331 | Upload Photo |
| Shakespeare Street, Theatre Royal | | | | 55°04′05″N 3°36′27″W | Category B | 26341 | Upload another image |
| 42 Terregles Street, Palmerston House, Gatepiers And Garden Walls | | | | 55°04′09″N 3°37′21″W | Category B | 26347 | Upload Photo |
| 3 Whitesands | | | | 55°04′09″N 3°36′58″W | Category C(S) | 26357 | Upload Photo |
| 32 Whitesands, The Poachers Rest | | | | 55°04′06″N 3°36′53″W | Category C(S) | 26358 | Upload Photo |
| 1, 5 Glasgow Street | | | | 55°04′07″N 3°38′05″W | Category B | 26210 | Upload another image |
| High Street, Midsteeple | | | | 55°04′09″N 3°36′39″W | Category A | 26215 | Upload another image |
| 83, 85, 87 High Street | | | | 55°04′05″N 3°36′38″W | Category C(S) | 26219 | Upload Photo |
| 123, 125, 127 High Street | | | | 55°04′07″N 3°36′40″W | Category B | 26226 | Upload Photo |
| 1, 2, 3, Hope Place | | | | 55°04′06″N 3°37′13″W | Category B | 26238 | Upload Photo |
| 29 Irish Street And 92 Whitesands Including Garden And Courtyard Walls, Outbuildings And Gatepiers | | | | 55°03′59″N 3°36′39″W | Category A | 26240 | Upload another image |
| 61 Irish Street, Albert Club | | | | 55°04′01″N 3°36′41″W | Category B | 26241 | Upload Photo |
| 63, 65 Irish Street And 7 Assembly Street | | | | 55°04′02″N 3°36′41″W | Category B | 26242 | Upload Photo |
| 133, 135 Irish Street | | | | 55°04′08″N 3°36′46″W | Category C(S) | 26245 | Upload Photo |
| Johnstone Park, 1-6 Johnstone Cottages (Inclusive Numbers) | | | | 55°03′40″N 3°36′02″W | Category B | 26257 | Upload Photo |
| Kellwood Place, Essex Park And Gatepiers | | | | 55°04′02″N 3°35′06″W | Category B | 26258 | Upload Photo |
| Laurieknowe, Ymca, Y2 Centre (Former Maxwelltown Free Church) | | | | 55°04′03″N 3°37′20″W | Category B | 26263 | Upload Photo |
| 30 Laurieknowe | | | | 55°04′01″N 3°37′20″W | Category B | 26266 | Upload Photo |
| 48, 50 Laurieknowe | | | | 55°03′59″N 3°37′23″W | Category C(S) | 26268 | Upload Photo |
| 122 Loreburn Street | | | | 55°04′16″N 3°36′37″W | Category C(S) | 26274 | Upload Photo |
| Church Place, Burns' Statue | | | | 55°04′12″N 3°36′44″W | Category B | 26133 | Upload another image |
| Church Street, 3, 4 Corberry Place | | | | 55°03′52″N 3°36′49″W | Category C(S) | 26138 | Upload Photo |
| Craigs Road, St Joseph's College Presbytery | | | | 55°03′49″N 3°36′00″W | Category B | 26147 | Upload Photo |
| Dalbeattie Road, Macgowan Memorial Fountain | | | | 55°03′55″N 3°37′30″W | Category B | 26151 | Upload Photo |
| 19, 21, 23 English Street | | | | 55°04′07″N 3°36′34″W | Category B | 26164 | Upload Photo |
| 103, 105, 107 English Street | | | | 55°04′09″N 3°36′26″W | Category B | 26171 | Upload Photo |
| English Street, Kirkbank | | | | 55°04′12″N 3°36′21″W | Category B | 26175 | Upload Photo |
| 18 English Street, 2-6 Queen Street (Even Numbers) | | | | 55°04′06″N 3°36′34″W | Category C(S) | 26179 | Upload Photo |
| 30, 32 English Street | | | | 55°04′06″N 3°36′33″W | Category C(S) | 26181 | Upload Photo |
| 102, 104 English Street | | | | 55°04′08″N 3°36′26″W | Category C(S) | 26187 | Upload Photo |
| George Street, Former Freemasons Hall | | | | 55°04′13″N 3°36′58″W | Category B | 26201 | Upload another image |
| George Street, St George's Church (Church Of Scotland) | | | | 55°04′16″N 3°36′48″W | Category B | 26206 | Upload another image |
| 1 Georgetown Road, Dunibert/196 Annan Road, Rowanlea | | | | 55°04′10″N 3°35′12″W | Category C(S) | 26208 | Upload another image |
| 1 Bank Street 66 Whitesands Coach And Horses Inn | | | | 55°04′04″N 3°36′46″W | Category C(S) | 26082 | Upload Photo |
| 33-41 Bank Street (Odd Numbers) | | | | 55°04′06″N 3°36′41″W | Category B | 26086 | Upload Photo |
| 17 Buccleuch Street | | | | 55°04′10″N 3°36′58″W | Category C(S) | 26097 | Upload Photo |
| 75, 77, 79 Buccleuch Street | | | | 55°04′13″N 3°36′50″W | Category B | 26100 | Upload Photo |
| Netherwood House Gatepiers On Main Drive And At Lodge | | | | 55°02′20″N 3°35′09″W | Category B | 3834 | Upload Photo |
| Brownrig Farmhouse And Gatepiers | | | | 55°04′36″N 3°34′34″W | Category C(S) | 3836 | Upload Photo |
| Netherwood Mains Farmhouse And Gatepiers To North (Garden Access) | | | | 55°02′09″N 3°35′25″W | Category B | 3822 | Upload Photo |
| Market Square, Brigend Theatre | | | | 55°04′04″N 3°37′05″W | Category C(S) | 51408 | Upload Photo |
| Newbridge, Smithy | | | | 55°05′40″N 3°38′53″W | Category C(S) | 26289 | Upload Photo |
| 3, 7 Nith Bank | | | | 55°03′40″N 3°36′11″W | Category C(S) | 26298 | Upload Photo |
| Old Bridge Street, Folk Museum Adjoining Devorgilla Bridge | | | | 55°04′04″N 3°37′00″W | Category B | 26310 | Upload another image |
| 63, 65 Queensberry Street, Including Rob Roy Public House | | | | 55°04′10″N 3°36′39″W | Category B | 26316 | Upload Photo |
| Ryedale Road, Ryedale House | | | | 55°03′42″N 3°36′44″W | Category C(S) | 26330 | Upload Photo |
| 14 St Andrew Street And 121 Queensberry Street | | | | 55°04′13″N 3°36′41″W | Category C(S) | 26332 | Upload Photo |
| St Michael's Churchyard And Main Gate And Holy Cross Churchyard | | | | 55°03′55″N 3°36′21″W | Category A | 26336 | Upload another image |
| Station Road, Station Hotel And Retaining Wall And Railings | | | | 55°04′19″N 3°36′18″W | Category B | 26344 | Upload another image See more images |
| Troqueer Road, Troqueer Church, Churchyard And Session House | | | | 55°03′34″N 3°36′26″W | Category B | 26349 | Upload another image |
| 48, 49, 50 Whitesands, Market Office And Warehouse To North East | | | | 55°04′05″N 3°36′49″W | Category B | 26360 | Upload Photo |
| 71, 73, 75 High Street | | | | 55°04′04″N 3°36′37″W | Category C(S) | 26217 | Upload Photo |
| 79 High Street, County Hotel | | | | 55°04′04″N 3°36′37″W | Category C(S) | 26218 | Upload Photo |
| 144, 146, 148, 150 High Street And 1 Queensberry Square | | | | 55°04′10″N 3°36′41″W | Category C(S) | 26235 | Upload Photo |
| 152, 154, 156, 158 High Street Including Hole I' The Wa' Inn | | | | 55°04′10″N 3°36′41″W | Category B | 26236 | Upload Photo |
| 139 Irish Street, Employment Office | | | | 55°04′08″N 3°36′46″W | Category B | 26246 | Upload Photo |
| 9, 11, 15A, 15 Irving Street | | | | 55°04′16″N 3°36′46″W | Category B | 26255 | Upload Photo |
| Laurieknowe Place North Hazelwood, Garden Wall, Gatepiers, Gates And Fountain | | | | 55°04′02″N 3°37′27″W | Category B | 26270 | Upload Photo |
| 31 (Torbay Lodge), 33 Lovers Walk And Gatepiers | | | | 55°04′21″N 3°36′25″W | Category B | 26278 | Upload Photo |
| 4, 6 Church Crescent | | | | 55°04′13″N 3°36′44″W | Category C(S) | 26130 | Upload Photo |
| Craigs Road, The Ranch, Formerly St Michael's Lodge | | | | 55°03′48″N 3°36′09″W | Category B | 26143 | Upload Photo |
| 28 Edinburgh Road, Gracefield Arts Centre And Gatepiers | | | | 55°04′27″N 3°36′27″W | Category B | 26157 | Upload Photo |
| Edinburgh Road, Nunfield | | | | 55°04′47″N 3°36′12″W | Category B | 26159 | Upload Photo |
| 5, 7 English Street | | | | 55°04′05″N 3°36′35″W | Category C(S) | 26161 | Upload Photo |
| 114, 116, 118 English Street | | | | 55°04′09″N 3°36′25″W | Category C(S) | 26188 | Upload Photo |
| 1, 2, 3, 4 Galloway Street, Market Square Including Clydesdale Bank | | | | 55°04′07″N 3°37′05″W | Category B | 26197 | Upload another image |
| Coach-House To Rear Of 32 George Street | | | | 55°04′14″N 3°36′52″W | Category B | 26205 | Upload Photo |
| 18 Bank Street | | | | 55°04′04″N 3°36′43″W | Category C(S) | 26090 | Upload Photo |
| 20, 22 Brewery Street | | | | 55°04′08″N 3°36′54″W | Category C(S) | 26095 | Upload Photo |
| Buccleuch Street, Buccleuch Street Bridge | | | | 55°04′08″N 3°37′03″W | Category B | 26096 | Upload another image See more images |
| 83 Buccleuch Street, Former Methodist Church And Railings | | | | 55°04′13″N 3°36′48″W | Category A | 26102 | Upload another image See more images |
| 6, 8 Buccleuch Street | | | | 55°04′09″N 3°36′58″W | Category C(S) | 26103 | Upload Photo |
| 40 Buccleuch Street, Sheriff Court House And Offices And Piers And Railings | | | | 55°04′10″N 3°36′54″W | Category B | 26108 | Upload another image |
| 52, 54 Buccleuch Street | | | | 55°04′11″N 3°36′51″W | Category B | 26111 | Upload Photo |
| 9-15 Castle Street (Odd Numbers) | | | | 55°04′12″N 3°36′46″W | Category B | 26116 | Upload Photo |
| The Crichton, Easterbrook Hall | | | | 55°03′04″N 3°35′30″W | Category B | 6699 | Upload another image See more images |
| Kelton Former Stables | | | | 55°01′47″N 3°34′51″W | Category B | 3821 | Upload Photo |
| Brooke Street, St Andrew's Church Hall With Boundary Wall And Railings | | | | 55°04′06″N 3°36′22″W | Category C(S) | 49595 | Upload Photo |
| The Crichton, Campbell House | | | | 55°03′13″N 3°35′41″W | Category C(S) | 51000 | Upload Photo |
| The Crichton, Galloway House | | | | 55°02′58″N 3°35′37″W | Category C(S) | 51001 | Upload Photo |
| Newbridge, Embassy Hotel Formerly Woodlands | | | | 55°05′37″N 3°39′10″W | Category B | 26291 | Upload Photo |
| Newbridge, Embassy Hotel (Formerly Woodlands) Southwest Entrance, Gatepiers And Quadrant Walls | | | | 55°05′34″N 3°39′09″W | Category B | 26292 | Upload Photo |
| Nith Viaduct, (Former Castle Douglas-Dumfries Line Over River Nith) | | | | 55°04′47″N 3°36′46″W | Category B | 26306 | Upload another image |
| 29 Rotchell Road, Rotchell House | | | | 55°03′51″N 3°36′59″W | Category B | 26329 | Upload Photo |
| St Mary's Street, St Mary's Church And Churchyard And Gatepiers | | | | 55°04′14″N 3°36′23″W | Category B | 26333 | Upload Photo |
| 103, 105, 107 St Michael's Street, Moorhead's Hospital | | | | 55°03′53″N 3°36′26″W | Category B | 26339 | Upload Photo |
| Whitesands Caul | | | | 55°04′03″N 3°36′54″W | Category B | 26353 | Upload Photo |
| 24, 26, 28 Laurieknowe, Including Garden Walls And Gatepiers | | | | 55°04′02″N 3°37′19″W | Category B | 26265 | Upload Photo |
| 29, 30 Maxwell Street, St Benedict's | | | | 55°03′57″N 3°37′14″W | Category B | 26282 | Upload Photo |
| Church Crescent, Greyfriars' Church | | | | 55°04′14″N 3°36′45″W | Category A | 26126 | Upload another image See more images |
| 8, 10, 12, 14 Church Crescent | | | | 55°04′13″N 3°36′44″W | Category C(S) | 26131 | Upload Photo |
| Craigs Road, St Joseph's College, Main College Building | | | | 55°03′49″N 3°36′04″W | Category B | 26144 | Upload Photo |
| Craigs Road, St Joseph's College Mount St Michael's (Brothers' Recreation Block) | | | | 55°03′48″N 3°35′58″W | Category B | 26146 | Upload Photo |
| 4 Edinburgh Road, Elmbank House (Elmbank School And Radio Solway) | | | | 55°04′22″N 3°36′29″W | Category B | 26156 | Upload Photo |
| 11, 13, 15, 17 English Street | | | | 55°04′06″N 3°36′34″W | Category B | 26163 | Upload Photo |
| 25, 29, 31 English Street | | | | 55°04′07″N 3°36′34″W | Category B | 26165 | Upload Photo |
| 39, 41, 43 English Street | | | | 55°04′07″N 3°36′33″W | Category C(S) | 26168 | Upload Photo |
| 54, 56 English Street | | | | 55°04′07″N 3°36′31″W | Category B | 26184 | Upload Photo |
| 5, 7, 9 Friars Vennel, Corner Of Brewery Street | | | | 55°04′08″N 3°36′54″W | Category C(S) | 26189 | Upload Photo |
| 43, 44, 45, 46 Galloway Street | | | | 55°04′08″N 3°37′06″W | Category C(S) | 26200 | Upload another image |
| 1, 3 Academy Street | | | | 55°04′16″N 3°36′43″W | Category C(S) | 26076 | Upload Photo |
| Academy Street, Townhead Dining Centre | | | | 55°04′21″N 3°36′33″W | Category B | 26079 | Upload Photo |
| 8 Bank Street | | | | 55°04′04″N 3°36′43″W | Category B | 26088 | Upload Photo |
| 52 Bank Street | | | | 55°04′06″N 3°36′39″W | Category C(S) | 26092 | Upload Photo |
| Bankend Road, St Michael's Coach House | | | | 55°03′37″N 3°36′03″W | Category C(S) | 26094 | Upload Photo |
| The Crichton, Crichton Memorial Church | | | | 55°03′03″N 3°35′39″W | Category A | 6695 | Upload another image See more images |
| The Crichton, Rutherford House And Mccowan House | | | | 55°02′52″N 3°35′19″W | Category B | 6696 | Upload Photo |
| The Crichton, Annandale House | | | | 55°02′54″N 3°35′39″W | Category C(S) | 6697 | Upload Photo |
| Heathall Farm Railway Bridge | | | | 55°05′27″N 3°35′03″W | Category C(S) | 3820 | Upload Photo |
| Kingholm Leeholm Currie House Belonging To Sai And House Adjoining | | | | 55°02′48″N 3°36′19″W | Category B | 3826 | Upload Photo |
| Edinburgh Road, Marchfield House With Ancillary Structure | | | | 55°05′05″N 3°35′38″W | Category C(S) | 48571 | Upload Photo |
| Newbridge Woodlands Lodge, Gatepiers And Quadrant Walls At East Gate To Embassy Hotel | | | | 55°05′40″N 3°38′57″W | Category B | 26293 | Upload Photo |
| 2 Nith Bank | | | | 55°03′41″N 3°36′11″W | Category C(S) | 26297 | Upload Photo |
| 8, 10 Nith Place, Queen O' The South Bar | | | | 55°03′59″N 3°36′34″W | Category B | 26304 | Upload Photo |
| 37 (Crindau) And 39 Nunholm Road | | | | 55°04′43″N 3°36′33″W | Category B | 26307 | Upload Photo |
| Rae Street, Former St John's School | | | | 55°04′15″N 3°36′32″W | Category B | 26326 | Upload Photo |
| Troqueer Road, Troqueer Manse (And Gatepiers) | | | | 55°03′32″N 3°36′23″W | Category B | 26350 | Upload Photo |
| 2 Troqueer Road, Charter House | | | | 55°03′49″N 3°36′44″W | Category B | 26351 | Upload Photo |
| 105 High Street And 54 Bank Street | | | | 55°04′06″N 3°36′38″W | Category C(S) | 26220 | Upload Photo |
| 107, 109 High Street And 51 Bank Street | | | | 55°04′06″N 3°36′39″W | Category B | 26221 | Upload Photo |
| 143 High Street | | | | 55°04′09″N 3°36′41″W | Category B | 26227 | Upload Photo |
| 93 Irish Street | | | | 55°04′04″N 3°36′42″W | Category B | 26243 | Upload Photo |
| 86, 88 Irish Street | | | | 55°04′04″N 3°36′41″W | Category B | 26249 | Upload Photo |
| 168, 170, 172 Irish Street | | | | 55°04′11″N 3°36′48″W | Category B | 26252 | Upload Photo |
| Laurieknowe, Maxwelltown West Church | | | | 55°04′04″N 3°37′12″W | Category B | 26259 | Upload Photo |
| 14, 14A, 14B, 14C Laurieknowe | | | | 55°04′04″N 3°37′15″W | Category C(S) | 26261 | Upload Photo |
| 83 New Abbey Road, Former Lodge And Gatepiers | | | | 55°03′25″N 3°37′17″W | Category B | 26286 | Upload Photo |
| 26, 28, 30 Castle Street | | | | 55°04′17″N 3°36′51″W | Category A | 26123 | Upload Photo |
| Catherine Street, Ewart Library | | | | 55°04′17″N 3°36′34″W | Category B | 26124 | Upload Photo |
| 2 Church Crescent | | | | 55°04′12″N 3°36′43″W | Category B | 26129 | Upload Photo |
| Craigs Road, St Joseph's College Glebe Cottage (Facing Aldermanhill Road) | | | | 55°03′53″N 3°36′10″W | Category C(S) | 26150 | Upload Photo |
| Dalbeattie Road, Cassalands House | | | | 55°03′54″N 3°37′29″W | Category C(S) | 26152 | Upload Photo |
| 30 Edinburgh Road (Education Offices) | | | | 55°04′28″N 3°36′26″W | Category C(S) | 26158 | Upload Photo |
| 14 English Street | | | | 55°04′05″N 3°36′34″W | Category C(S) | 26177 | Upload Photo |
| 48, 50 English Street | | | | 55°04′07″N 3°36′31″W | Category B | 26183 | Upload Photo |
| 27, 28 Galloway Street | | | | 55°04′06″N 3°37′11″W | Category B | 26198 | Upload Photo |
| 43-49 Bank Street (Odd Numbers) | | | | 55°04′06″N 3°36′40″W | Category B | 26087 | Upload Photo |
| 16 Buccleuch Street | | | | 55°04′10″N 3°36′57″W | Category C(S) | 26105 | Upload Photo |
| 22 Buccleuch Street | | | | 55°04′10″N 3°36′57″W | Category C(S) | 26106 | Upload Photo |
| The Crichton, Carmont House | | | | 55°02′49″N 3°35′13″W | Category B | 6692 | Upload Photo |
| The Crichton, Crichton Farm | | | | 55°02′50″N 3°35′32″W | Category A | 6693 | Upload Photo |
| Kingholm Quay | | | | 55°02′46″N 3°36′22″W | Category B | 3827 | Upload Photo |
| 1, 2, 3 And 4 Maidenbower | | | | 55°03′17″N 3°34′53″W | Category B | 3830 | Upload Photo |
| Crichton Royal Infirmary Low Lodge And Gatepiers | | | | 55°03′14″N 3°36′00″W | Category C(S) | 3816 | Upload Photo |
| Crichton Royal Hospital Octagonal Pavilion | | | | 55°03′17″N 3°35′49″W | Category B | 3817 | Upload Photo |
| Ellangowan House And Gatepiers | | | | 55°03′12″N 3°35′22″W | Category B | 3818 | Upload Photo |
| Heathall Industrial Estate, Dumfries And Galloway Aviation Museum, Former Control Tower | | | | 55°05′28″N 3°34′06″W | Category C(S) | 50613 | Upload Photo |
| 1 Nith Bank | | | | 55°03′41″N 3°36′12″W | Category C(S) | 26296 | Upload Photo |
| 5, 5A Nith Bank | | | | 55°03′40″N 3°36′10″W | Category C(S) | 26300 | Upload Photo |
| 24 Queen Street | | | | 55°04′05″N 3°36′31″W | Category B | 26313 | Upload Photo |
| 128 Queensberry Street | | | | 55°04′15″N 3°36′40″W | Category B | 26324 | Upload another image |
| St Michael's Street, St Michael's Churchyard Burns' Mausoleum | | | | 55°03′54″N 3°36′18″W | Category A | 26337 | Upload Photo |
| Whitesands, Devorgilla Bridge | | | | 55°04′06″N 3°36′58″W | Category A | 26354 | Upload another image See more images |
| 1, 2 Whitesands And 2, 4 Buccleuch Street | | | | 55°04′09″N 3°36′59″W | Category C(S) | 26356 | Upload Photo |
| 43 Whitesands | | | | 55°04′05″N 3°36′50″W | Category C(S) | 26359 | Upload Photo |
| 111 High Street | | | | 55°04′07″N 3°36′39″W | Category B | 26222 | Upload Photo |
| 153 High Street, Royal Bank Of Scotland (Northern Block Only) | | | | 55°04′09″N 3°36′41″W | Category C(S) | 26228 | Upload Photo |
| 120, 122, 124 High Street And 3 Old Union Street | | | | 55°04′07″N 3°36′37″W | Category B | 26232 | Upload Photo |
| Hill Street, Mount Pleasant | | | | 55°03′59″N 3°37′15″W | Category C(S) | 26237 | Upload Photo |
| 9 Irish Street And 99 Whitesands | | | | 55°03′58″N 3°36′38″W | Category C(S) | 26239 | Upload Photo |
| 119-127 Irish Street (Odd Numbers Only) | | | | 55°04′07″N 3°36′45″W | Category C(S) | 26244 | Upload Photo |
| 15, 17 Lovers Walk (And Gatepiers) | | | | 55°04′21″N 3°36′27″W | Category B | 26275 | Upload Photo |
| Lovers Walk, St John's Episcopal Church And Hall | | | | 55°04′18″N 3°36′24″W | Category B | 26279 | Upload Photo |
| Moffat Road, Huntingdon | | | | 55°04′26″N 3°36′00″W | Category B | 26284 | Upload Photo |
| 7 Church Place, Corner Of St Andrew Street | | | | 55°04′12″N 3°36′43″W | Category B | 26134 | Upload another image |
| Church Street, Dumfries Museum Observatory | | | | 55°03′55″N 3°36′52″W | Category A | 26135 | Upload another image |
| Church Street, Arundel House | | | | 55°03′53″N 3°36′48″W | Category B | 26140 | Upload Photo |
| College Road, Old Stakeford | | | | 55°04′35″N 3°37′10″W | Category C(S) | 26142 | Upload Photo |
| English Street, Queensberry Column (In Front Of Regional Council Offices) | | | | 55°04′09″N 3°36′39″W | Category A | 26173 | Upload another image |
| 16 English Street, Queensberry Hotel | | | | 55°04′05″N 3°36′34″W | Category B | 26178 | Upload another image |
| 34, 36 English Street | | | | 55°04′07″N 3°36′32″W | Category B | 26182 | Upload Photo |
| 114, 116 Friars Vennel | | | | 55°04′11″N 3°36′45″W | Category B | 26196 | Upload Photo |
| 32-40 George Street (Even Numbers) | | | | 55°04′15″N 3°36′52″W | Category B | 26204 | Upload Photo |
| 54, 56 George Street, Assembly Rooms Corner Of Irving Street | | | | 55°04′16″N 3°36′47″W | Category B | 26207 | Upload Photo |
| Georgetown Road, Lochvale House | | | | 55°03′51″N 3°34′51″W | Category B | 26209 | Upload Photo |
| 26-30 Academy Street (Even Numbers) | | | | 55°04′16″N 3°36′39″W | Category C(S) | 26078 | Upload Photo |
| 5, 7, 9, 11 Bank Street | | | | 55°04′04″N 3°36′45″W | Category A | 26083 | Upload Photo |
| Buccleuch Street, Bethany Hall | | | | 55°04′12″N 3°36′49″W | Category C(S) | 26112 | Upload Photo |
| 24 Burns Street, Robert Burns' House | | | | 55°03′58″N 3°36′29″W | Category A | 26115 | Upload another image |
| 39 Castle Street/42 George Street | | | | 55°04′15″N 3°36′51″W | Category B | 26119 | Upload Photo |
| The Crichton, Grierson Gate Lodge And Gatepiers (Upper Brownhall Lodge) | | | | 55°03′02″N 3°35′23″W | Category B | 6694 | Upload Photo |
| The Crichton, The Conservatories And Boiler House | | | | 55°02′58″N 3°35′51″W | Category B | 6698 | Upload Photo |
| The Crichton, Mochrum And Monreith | | | | 55°02′55″N 3°35′42″W | Category C(S) | 6704 | Upload Photo |
| Ladyfield East House And Gatepiers | | | | 55°03′01″N 3°36′01″W | Category B | 3828 | Upload Photo |
| Marchmount Avenue Marchmount | | | | 55°04′34″N 3°35′42″W | Category B | 3831 | Upload Photo |
| Martinton Bridge (Railway Viaduct Over River Nith) | | | | 55°05′04″N 3°36′35″W | Category B | 3832 | Upload another image |
| The Crichton, Johnston House | | | | 55°03′08″N 3°35′35″W | Category B | 3815 | Upload another image |
| 2 Hill Street, Mayfield House Summer House And Tool Shed | | | | 55°03′59″N 3°37′20″W | Category B | 50281 | Upload Photo |
| The Crichton, Boiler House | | | | 55°02′53″N 3°35′31″W | Category C(S) | 50998 | Upload Photo |
| The Crichton, Dudgeon And Cardoness | | | | 55°02′58″N 3°35′22″W | Category B | 42473 | Upload Photo |
| The Crichton, Maxwell House | | | | 55°02′59″N 3°35′26″W | Category B | 42474 | Upload Photo |
| Newall Terrace, Baptist Church | | | | 55°04′16″N 3°36′27″W | Category B | 26288 | Upload Photo |
| 2, 4, 6 Nunholm Road, Albany Place | | | | 55°04′36″N 3°36′27″W | Category C(S) | 26308 | Upload Photo |
| Park Road Park Farmhouse | | | | 55°03′42″N 3°37′27″W | Category C(S) | 26311 | Upload Photo |
| 69 Queensberry Street | | | | 55°04′11″N 3°36′40″W | Category B | 26317 | Upload Photo |
| 71 Queensberry Street | | | | 55°04′11″N 3°36′40″W | Category B | 26318 | Upload Photo |
| 117 Queensberry Street, Tam O'shanter Inn | | | | 55°04′13″N 3°36′41″W | Category C(S) | 26320 | Upload Photo |
| 82 Queensberry Street | | | | 55°04′11″N 3°36′38″W | Category B | 26322 | Upload Photo |
| Rotchell Park, Bank House And Gatepiers | | | | 55°03′50″N 3°36′51″W | Category C(S) | 26327 | Upload Photo |
| 44, 46 Rotchell Park, The Oaks And Machrie And Gatepiers | | | | 55°03′47″N 3°37′00″W | Category B | 26328 | Upload Photo |
| St Michael's Street, St Michael's Church | | | | 55°03′54″N 3°36′21″W | Category A | 26335 | Upload Photo |
| Terregles Street, Young Offenders' Institution, Formerly Dumfries Prison | | | | 55°04′05″N 3°37′33″W | Category B | 26346 | Upload Photo |
| Hardthorn, Pump At Nunwood | | | | 55°05′27″N 3°39′20″W | Category C(S) | 26213 | Upload Photo |
| 197 High Street | | | | 55°04′11″N 3°36′44″W | Category B | 26229 | Upload Photo |
| 56 High Street, Globe Inn | | | | 55°04′03″N 3°36′35″W | Category A | 26230 | Upload another image |
| 151 Irish Street | | | | 55°04′09″N 3°36′47″W | Category C(S) | 26247 | Upload Photo |
| 92, 94 Irish Street And 30 Bank Street | | | | 55°04′05″N 3°36′41″W | Category B | 26250 | Upload Photo |
| 16 Laurieknowe, Chapelmount | | | | 55°04′03″N 3°37′17″W | Category B | 26262 | Upload Photo |
| 27 (Kinderloch), 29 Lovers Walk And Gatepiers | | | | 55°04′21″N 3°36′26″W | Category B | 26277 | Upload Photo |
| Mill Road, Dumfries Town Mills (Robert Burns Centre) Sluice Gate And Outflow | | | | 55°04′00″N 3°36′51″W | Category B | 26283 | Upload another image |
| 9 Church Crescent Dumfries Savings Bank | | | | 55°04′15″N 3°36′45″W | Category B | 26128 | Upload Photo |
| 32, 34, 36 Church Crescent | | | | 55°04′15″N 3°36′42″W | Category C(S) | 26132 | Upload Photo |
| Church Street, Sinclair Memorial | | | | 55°03′56″N 3°36′54″W | Category B | 26136 | Upload Photo |
| Craigs Road, St Joseph's College, Aldermanhill House And Gatepiers (Chaplain's House) | | | | 55°03′53″N 3°36′01″W | Category B | 26149 | Upload Photo |
| 73, 75, 77 English Street | | | | 55°04′08″N 3°36′29″W | Category B | 26170 | Upload Photo |
| English Street, County Buildings | | | | 55°04′11″N 3°36′22″W | Category B | 26174 | Upload another image |
| 68, 70, 72, 74 English Street | | | | 55°04′08″N 3°36′29″W | Category B | 26185 | Upload Photo |
| 11, 13, 15 Friars Vennel | | | | 55°04′08″N 3°36′53″W | Category C(S) | 26190 | Upload Photo |
| 77 Friars Vennel | | | | 55°04′10″N 3°36′47″W | Category C(S) | 26193 | Upload Photo |
| 29, 30 Galloway Street | | | | 55°04′07″N 3°37′10″W | Category B | 26199 | Upload Photo |
| 61 George Street. Moat Brae, Including Railings | | | | 55°04′18″N 3°36′47″W | Category B | 26203 | Upload Photo |
| 2 Assembly Street, (Former Dumfries And Galloway Club) | | | | 55°04′02″N 3°36′39″W | Category B | 26080 | Upload Photo |
| 24-36 Buccleuch Street (Even Numbers) Buccleuch Street Buildings | | | | 55°04′10″N 3°36′55″W | Category B | 26107 | Upload Photo |
| 48 Buccleuch Street | | | | 55°04′11″N 3°36′52″W | Category B | 26110 | Upload Photo |
| 62, 64 Buccleuch Street | | | | 55°04′12″N 3°36′48″W | Category C(S) | 26113 | Upload Photo |
| 41, 43, 45, 47 Castle Street | | | | 55°04′17″N 3°36′53″W | Category A | 26120 | Upload Photo |
| The Crichton, Grierson/Cairnsmore | | | | 55°03′02″N 3°35′28″W | Category B | 6701 | Upload Photo |
| Netherwood Bank | | | | 55°02′18″N 3°34′35″W | Category C(S) | 3835 | Upload Photo |
| Craigs Farm House And Steading | | | | 55°03′22″N 3°34′44″W | Category B | 3837 | Upload Photo |
| Crichton Royal Hospital Crichton Hall | | | | 55°03′13″N 3°35′48″W | Category A | 3839 | Upload Photo |
| Nunholm Road Nunholm | | | | 55°04′57″N 3°36′42″W | Category B | 3824 | Upload Photo |
| Nunholm House | | | | 55°04′59″N 3°36′36″W | Category C(S) | 3825 | Upload Photo |
| 43 Newall Terrace Including Lions | | | | 55°04′12″N 3°36′27″W | Category B | 26287 | Upload Photo |
| 4, 6 Nith Bank | | | | 55°03′40″N 3°36′11″W | Category C(S) | 26299 | Upload Photo |
| Nith Bank, Tormore And Gatepiers | | | | 55°03′42″N 3°36′14″W | Category B | 26301 | Upload Photo |
| 9, 11 Queen Street | | | | 55°04′06″N 3°36′32″W | Category C(S) | 26312 | Upload Photo |
| 13, 15, 17, 19 Glasgow Street | | | | 55°04′08″N 3°37′09″W | Category B | 26211 | Upload another image |
| High Street, Fountain | | | | 55°04′05″N 3°36′36″W | Category B | 26214 | Upload another image |
| 113, 115 High Street | | | | 55°04′07″N 3°36′40″W | Category C(S) | 26223 | Upload Photo |
| 126, 128, 130, 132 High Street | | | | 55°04′08″N 3°36′38″W | Category C(S) | 26233 | Upload Photo |
| 98 Irish Street | | | | 55°04′05″N 3°36′42″W | Category B | 26251 | Upload Photo |
| Irving Street, Congregational Church And Hall | | | | 55°04′16″N 3°36′45″W | Category B | 26254 | Upload Photo |
| 18, 18A Laurieknowe And Gatepiers | | | | 55°04′02″N 3°37′19″W | Category C(S) | 26264 | Upload Photo |
| 46, 48 Loreburn Street And 63 Newall Terrace Including Myles Bar | | | | 55°04′11″N 3°36′32″W | Category C(S) | 26271 | Upload Photo |
| 24, 26 Lovers Walk And 1 Newall Terrace | | | | 55°04′19″N 3°36′22″W | Category B | 26280 | Upload Photo |
| 1, 3, 5, 7 Church Crescent | | | | 55°04′14″N 3°36′44″W | Category C(S) | 26127 | Upload Photo |
| Church Street, 1, 2, Corberry Place (Flatted) | | | | 55°03′52″N 3°36′49″W | Category C(S) | 26137 | Upload Photo |
| College Road, Lincluden House, Stable Buildings | | | | 55°05′05″N 3°37′31″W | Category B | 26141 | Upload Photo |
| Eastfield Road, Eastfield | | | | 55°04′03″N 3°35′42″W | Category C(S) | 26154 | Upload Photo |
| 109, 111 English Street | | | | 55°04′10″N 3°36′25″W | Category B | 26172 | Upload Photo |
| 76, 78 English Street | | | | 55°04′08″N 3°36′29″W | Category C(S) | 26186 | Upload Photo |
| 80, 82 Friars Vennel, Corner Of Irish Street | | | | 55°04′10″N 3°36′47″W | Category B | 26195 | Upload Photo |
| Abbey Lane, Lincluden Collegiate Church | | | | 55°05′05″N 3°37′15″W | Category A | 26075 | Upload another image |
| 66, 68 Buccleuch Street | | | | 55°04′12″N 3°36′48″W | Category C(S) | 26114 | Upload Photo |
| 17 Castle Street | | | | 55°04′12″N 3°36′47″W | Category B | 26117 | Upload Photo |
| St Mary's Street, St Mary's Church Hall With Retaining And Boundary Wall, Gatepiers And Steps | | | | 55°04′13″N 3°36′17″W | Category C(S) | 49594 | Upload Photo |

== Key ==
The scheme for classifying buildings in Scotland is:

- Category A: "buildings of national or international importance, either architectural or historic; or fine, little-altered examples of some particular period, style or building type."
- Category B: "buildings of regional or more than local importance; or major examples of some particular period, style or building type, which may have been altered."
- Category C: "buildings of local importance; lesser examples of any period, style, or building type, as originally constructed or moderately altered; and simple traditional buildings which group well with other listed buildings."

In March 2016 there were 47,288 listed buildings in Scotland. Of these, 8% were Category A, and 50% were Category B, with the remaining 42% being Category C.
