= Nithsdale =

Scottish local government district (1975–1996), part of Dumfries and Galloway region

Coordinates: 55.133°N 3.733°W

- District
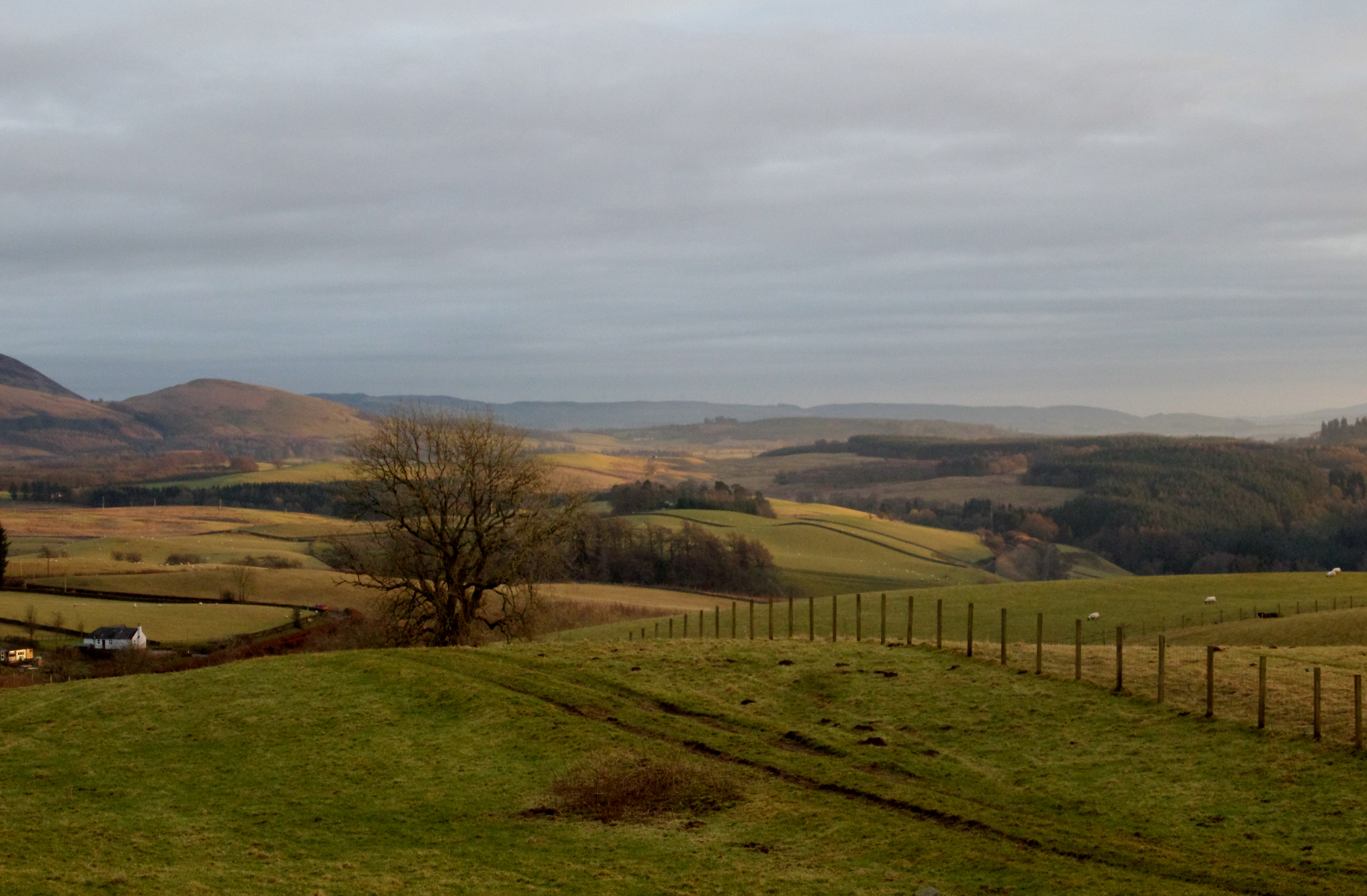

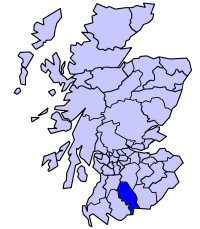
- History
  - Created: 16 May 1975
  - Abolished: 31 March 1996
  - Succeeded by: Dumfries and Galloway
  - HQ: Dumfries
- Contained within
  - Region: Dumfries and Galloway

Nithsdale (Scottish Gaelic: Srath Nid), also known as Strathnith, Stranith or Stranit, is the strath or dale of the River Nith in southern Scotland. Nithsdale was one of the medieval provinces of Scotland. The provinces gradually lost their administrative importance to the shires created from the twelfth century, with Nithsdale forming part of Dumfriesshire. A Nithsdale district covering a similar area to the medieval province was created in 1975, based in the area's main town of Dumfries. The district was abolished in 1996, since when the area has been directly administered by Dumfries and Galloway Council.

== History ==
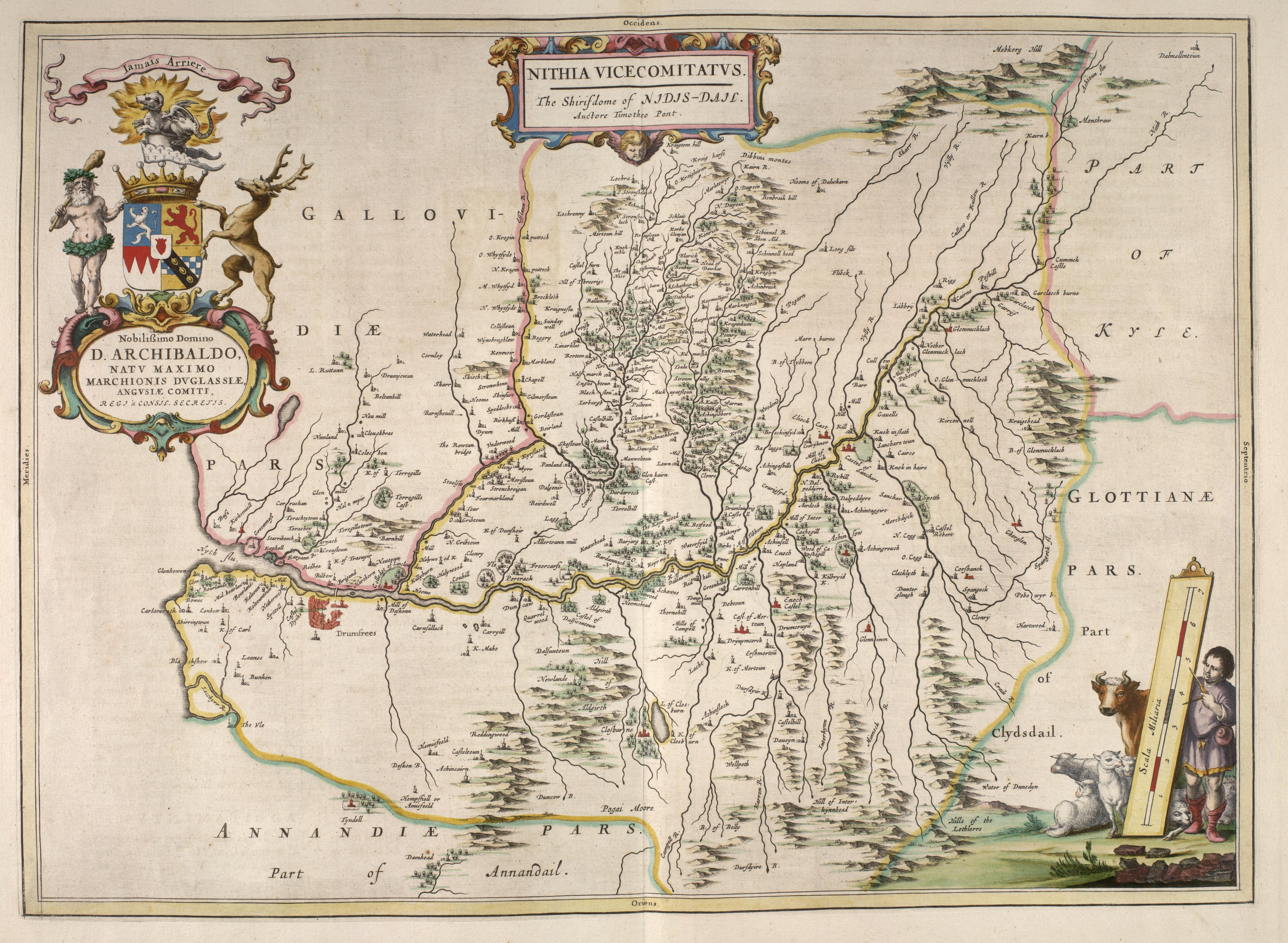
"Nithia Vicecomitatus": 1654 map of Nithsdale (with north to the right).

The name Strath Nid may represent the Cumbric Ystrad Nidd; Cumbric (a variety of Common Brittonic) was the dominant language in this area from before Roman times until the 11th or 12th century, whereas Gaelic influence here was late and transient. The River Nith flows north to south through the Southern Uplands in south-west Scotland, separating the Lowther Hills from the Scaur Hills. Nithsdale was historically a strategically important area, lying on some of the main routes from England to the south into the rest of Scotland. These routes were important for trade, but were also of military importance during the Wars of Scottish Independence and Anglo-Scottish Wars.

The province of Nithsdale bordered Annandale to the east, Clydesdale to the north, Kyle to the north-west and Galloway to the west. By 1305 the area was part of the shire of Dumfries. The sheriff of Dumfries also had nominal jurisdiction over neighbouring Annandale and Eskdale, but those two areas retained a large degree of independence with their own hereditary rulers, such that Nithsdale was the main area where the authority of the sheriff of Dumfries practically applied. The title Earl of Nithsdale was created in 1620 for Robert Maxwell of Caerlaverock Castle, but the title was forfeited in 1716 following the involvement of William Maxwell, 5th Earl of Nithsdale, in the Jacobite rising of 1715.

Gradually the shire became the more significant unit of local government than the provinces. Commissioners of Supply were created for each shire in 1667, and many of the old provinces (including Annandale and Eskdale) lost their hereditary rulers under the Heritable Jurisdictions (Scotland) Act 1746. The custom continued of describing Dumfriesshire as comprising three divisions called Annandale, Nithsdale and Eskdale. Dumfriesshire County Council was established in 1890 under the Local Government (Scotland) Act 1889.

== Nithsdale District ==
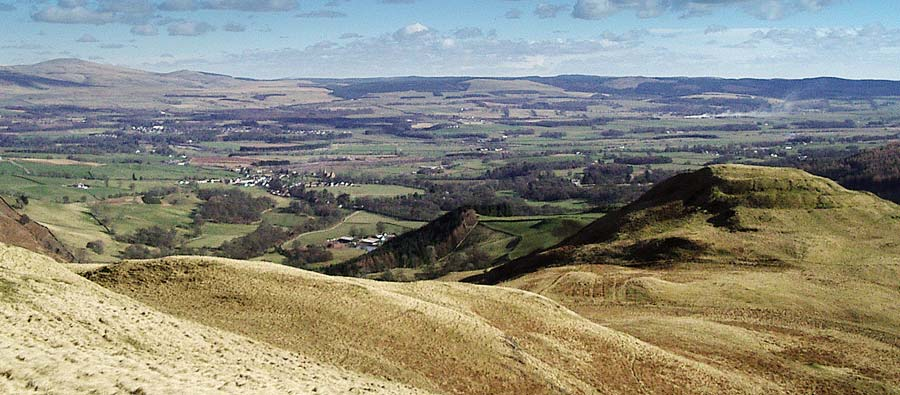
Looking east from Auchengibbert Hill with Tynron Doon in the right foreground and the valley of the River Nith (Nithsdale) beyond. Queensberry Hill is by the left edge of the picture with the village of Penpont in the near foreground (left of centre) and Thornhill in the middle distance between Penpont and Queensberry.

A local government district called Nithsdale was created on 16 May 1975 under the Local Government (Scotland) Act 1973, which established a two-tier structure of local government across Scotland comprising upper-tier regions and lower-tier districts. Nithsdale district was one of four districts created within the region of Dumfries and Galloway. The district covered the western part of Dumfriesshire, and also included the parishes of Kirkbean, Kirkpatrick Irongray, New Abbey, Terregles, and Troqueer, which had formerly been in Kirkcudbrightshire.

In terms of pre-1975 districts, Nithsdale district covered parts of seven former districts, which were all abolished at the same time. The Eastern District had been in Kirkcudbrightshire prior to the reforms, whereas all the other districts had been part of Dumfriesshire.

- Dumfries Burgh
- Dumfries District, except the parishes of Dalton and Lochmaben (which went to Annandale and Eskdale)
- Eastern District
- Sanquhar Burgh
- Thornhill
- Upper Nithsdale District

For lieutenancy purposes, the last lord-lieutenant of the county of Dumfriesshire was made lord-lieutenant for the combined area of Nithsdale and the neighbouring district of Annandale and Eskdale when the reforms came into effect in 1975.

Further local government reform in 1996 under the Local Government etc. (Scotland) Act 1994 saw the four districts of Dumfries and Galloway abolished, with Dumfries and Galloway Council taking over their functions. The council continues to use the former Nithsdale district as the basis of an area committee, alongside committees for the other three abolished districts of Annandale and Eskdale, Stewartry and Wigtown, subject to some adjustments of boundaries where ward boundaries no longer follow the pre-1996 district boundaries. The Dumfries lieutenancy area continues to cover the combined area of the pre-1996 Nithsdale and Annandale and Eskdale districts.

=== Political control ===
The first election to the district council was held in 1974, initially operating as a shadow authority alongside the outgoing authorities until it came into its powers on 16 May 1975. Political control of the council from 1975 was as follows:

Party in control	Years
Independent	1975–1984
No overall control	1984–1996

=== Premises ===
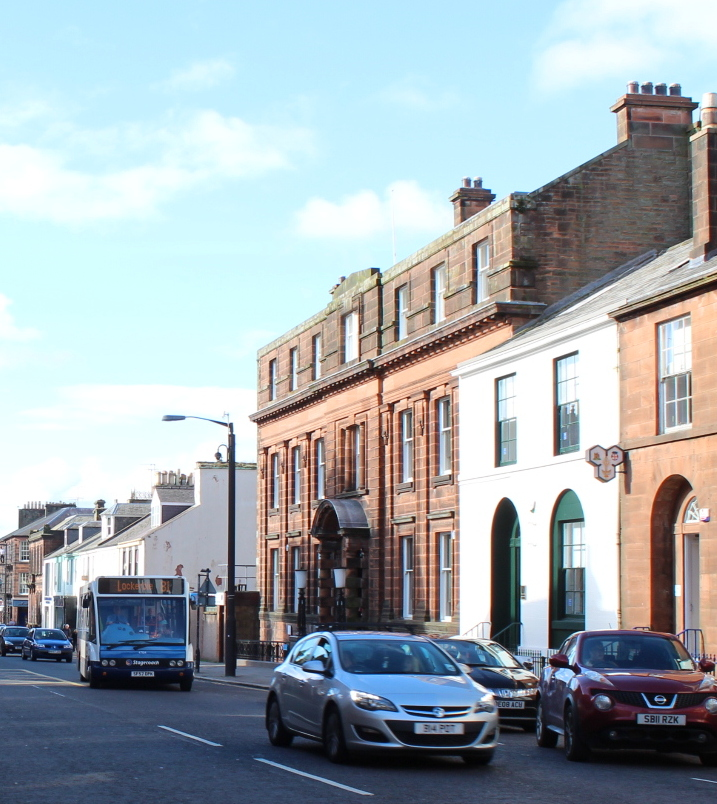
Municipal Buildings, Dumfries

Nithsdale District Council was based at the Municipal Buildings on Buccleuch Street in Dumfries, the district's largest town. The building had been built in 1932 as the headquarters of the former Dumfries Burgh Council.

== See also ==
- Subdivisions of Scotland
- Earl of Nithsdale
