= Dumfries Sheriff Court =

Municipal building in Dumfries, Scotland

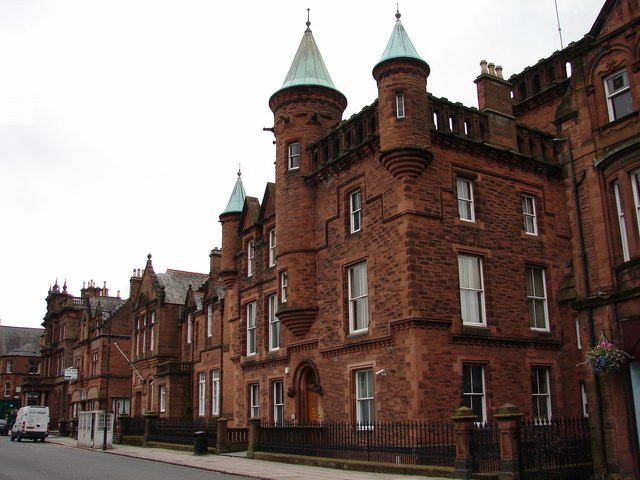
- The building in 2008

- Shown in Dumfries and Galloway
- 55.0695°N 3.6149°W
- Location: Buccleuch Street, Dumfries

History
- Built: 1866

Site notes
- Architect: David Rhind
- Architectural style: Scottish baronial style

Listed Building – Category B
- Official name: Dumfries Sheriff Court and Justice of the Peace Court, including entrance piers and railings, and excluding 1991–1994 extension to southeast, 40 Buccleuch Street, Dumfries
- Designated: 6 March 1981
- Reference no.: LB26108

Dumfries Sheriff Court is a judicial building on Buccleuch Street in Dumfries in Scotland. The building, which still operates as the local courthouse, is a Category B listed building.

== History ==
The first judicial building in the town was the old courthouse on the north side of Buccleuch Street which was originally commissioned as a chapel by the theologian, Robert Haldane, in 1799. It was remodelled at a cost of around £4,000, to a design by a Mr Gillespie in the neoclassical style for use as a courthouse in 1814. In the mid-19th century, court officials decided to commission a purpose-built courthouse. The site they selected was on the south side of Buccleuch Street.

The new building was designed by David Rhind in the Scottish baronial style, built in red sandstone from Locharbriggs Quarry and was officially opened in time for the spring assizes on 17 April 1866. The original design involved an asymmetrical main frontage of four bays facing onto Buccleuch Street. The third bay on the left featured a round headed entrance with a hood mould ending in moulded ropes; there was a corbeled turret with a conical roof above. The first two bays and the right-hand bay were fenestrated with sash windows on all three floors with the second floor windows being smaller that the others. The first two bays were surmounted by gables, the right hand bay was surmounted by a balustrade and there were bartizans with conical roofs at both corners of the building. Internally, the principal room was the main courtroom which featured a coffered ceiling.

A building designed as a post office by Walter Wood Robertson in the Jacobean style was erected on an adjacent site to the northeast of the courthouse in 1887 and later integrated into the complex. Some internal alterations were made in the early 1990s.

In November 1991, the building was the venue for the issue of a warrant for the arrest of Abdelbaset al-Megrahi and Lamin Khalifah Fhimah in connection with the bombing of Pan Am Flight 103 over Lockerbie on 21 December 1988. Megrahi was later convicted, by special court at Camp Zeist in the Netherlands, of 270 counts of murder but Fhimah was acquitted. The building remains the venue for hearings of the Dumfries Sheriff Court.

== See also ==
- List of listed buildings in Dumfries
