= List of listed buildings in Annan, Dumfries and Galloway =

This is a list of listed buildings in the parish of Annan in Dumfries and Galloway, Scotland.

== List ==
Name	Location	Date Listed	Grid Ref. (Note: Sometimes known as OSGB36, the grid reference (where provided) is based on the British national grid reference system used by the Ordnance Survey. • "Guide to National Grid". Ordnance Survey. • "Get-a-map". Ordnance Survey.)	Geo-coordinates	Notes	LB Number (Note: Historic Environment Scotland assign a unique alphanumeric identifier to each designated site in Scotland, for listed buildings this always begins with "LB", for example "LB12345".)	Image
74-78 (Even Nos) High Street				54°59′15″N 3°15′44″W	Category B	21103	Upload Photo
18 Scott Street, former Stables, (now Property of Seaforth Cottage)				54°59′12″N 3°15′15″W	Category C(S)	21121	Upload Photo
Solway Street, Seaforth House and Gatepiers and Railings				54°59′08″N 3°15′16″W	Category B	21124	Upload Photo
Standalane, Newington House				54°59′26″N 3°15′13″W	Category C(S)	21125	Upload Photo
3-11 (Odd Nos) Bank Street				54°59′13″N 3°15′44″W	Category C(S)	21063	Upload Photo
Church Street, 1-12 (inclusive Nos) Cumberland Terrace, 4 Solway Street, including Boundary Walls and Gatepiers				54°59′12″N 3°15′25″W	Category B	21077	Upload Photo
Greencroft Wynd Dovecot				54°59′11″N 3°15′47″W	Category C(S)	21083	Upload Photo
Blacketlees Farmhouse and Steading				55°00′21″N 3°16′08″W	Category B	3488	Upload Photo
Diamond Jubilee Bridge				55°00′21″N 3°15′56″W	Category B	3506	Upload another image
Hayknowes former Bacon Factory (on East Side of Road)				54°58′39″N 3°17′32″W	Category B	3509	Upload Photo
Mount Annan Stables				55°00′54″N 3°15′21″W	Category C(S)	3516	Upload Photo
Warmanbie Cottage				55°00′27″N 3°15′25″W	Category B	3482	Upload Photo
18-26 (Even Nos) Port Street including Low Wing adjoining at South				54°59′11″N 3°15′56″W	Category C(S)	50179	Upload Photo
73 And 75 High Street				54°59′14″N 3°15′43″W	Category B	21092	Upload Photo
66, 68 High Street				54°59′15″N 3°15′45″W	Category C(S)	21102	Upload Photo
19 Bank Street, Post Office				54°59′11″N 3°15′44″W	Category B	21065	Upload Photo
Bank Street, Former Library and Public Hall				54°59′12″N 3°15′42″W	Category B	21068	Upload Photo
12 Downie's Wynd, Market Hall				54°59′13″N 3°15′41″W	Category B	21079	Upload Photo
5, 7, 9 High Street ("Old Academy")				54°59′13″N 3°15′54″W	Category A	21086	Upload another image
Beckfoot Farmhouse with Steading and Gatepiers				54°58′46″N 3°13′29″W	Category B	3487	Upload Photo
Distillery Farm, Z-Plan Former Distillery Range and Tall Chimney Stack				55°00′08″N 3°15′38″W	Category B	3507	Upload Photo
Milnfield Cottage				54°59′07″N 3°16′23″W	Category C(S)	3514	Upload Photo
Preston Hall Farmhouse				55°00′05″N 3°13′52″W	Category C(S)	3479	Upload Photo
121 High Street, Argyle House				54°59′14″N 3°15′33″W	Category B	50032	Upload Photo
High Street, Dovecot to Rear of Queensberry Arms				54°59′12″N 3°15′46″W	Category B	21090	Upload Photo
2-10 (Even Nos) High Street, Blue Bell Inn including former Stables Court				54°59′14″N 3°15′54″W	Category B	21096	Upload another image
Port Street, Braehouse				54°59′07″N 3°16′04″W	Category B	21112	Upload Photo
28 Port Street, Scaurbank and Gatepiers and Boundary Walls				54°59′10″N 3°15′59″W	Category C(S)	21116	Upload another image
Station Road, Annan Academy				54°59′05″N 3°15′36″W	Category B	21126	Upload another image
Station Road Annan Station				54°59′01″N 3°15′44″W	Category B	21127	Upload Photo
2, 4 Battery Street				54°59′14″N 3°15′53″W	Category B	21071	Upload Photo
2, 4, 6 Carlyle Place				54°59′10″N 3°15′54″W	Category B	21075	Upload Photo
Bonshaw Lodge and Gatepiers				55°02′31″N 3°11′39″W	Category C(S)	3492	Upload Photo
Brydekirk Mains Farmhouse and Steading including St Bride's Tower				55°01′41″N 3°16′28″W	Category C(S)	3493	Upload Photo
Hayknowes Farmhouse And Steading				54°58′39″N 3°17′34″W	Category C(S)	3508	Upload Photo
Newbie Walled Garden				54°58′14″N 3°17′28″W	Category B	3475	Upload Photo
Watchill House				54°59′06″N 3°14′47″W	Category C(S)	3484	Upload Photo
Bruce Street and North Street, Greenbank with Lodge, Gates and Gatepiers				54°59′25″N 3°15′49″W	Category C(S)	48277	Upload Photo
83, 85, 87 High Street				54°59′14″N 3°15′40″W	Category C(S)	21094	Upload Photo
64 High Street				54°59′15″N 3°15′45″W	Category C(S)	21101	Upload Photo
80 High Street				54°59′15″N 3°15′42″W	Category B	21104	Upload Photo
75-87 (Odd Nos) Port Street and Welldale Mill adjoining				54°58′57″N 3°16′13″W	Category B	21113	Upload Photo
Station Road: Central Hotel				54°59′05″N 3°15′44″W	Category C(S)	21128	Upload another image
Annan Viaduct				54°59′05″N 3°16′17″W	Category B	21062	Upload another image
27, 29 Bank Street and Gatepiers and Railings				54°59′11″N 3°15′44″W	Category A	21066	Upload Photo
35, 37 Butts Street				54°59′22″N 3°15′37″W	Category C(S)	21073	Upload Photo
6 Butts Street including Gatepiers and Vaulted Cellars				54°59′17″N 3°15′35″W	Category B	21074	Upload Photo
11, 13 Church Street				54°59′13″N 3°15′28″W	Category B	21076	Upload Photo
30, 32 Ednam Street				54°59′10″N 3°15′34″W	Category B	21082	Upload Photo
Bonshaw Tower and House and Courtyard Walls				55°02′14″N 3°11′12″W	Category A	3489	Upload another image
Brydekirk Village: Brydekirk Church				55°01′17″N 3°16′47″W	Category C(S)	3495	Upload another image
Croftheads Farmhouse and Steading				54°59′00″N 3°17′46″W	Category C(S)	3497	Upload Photo
Northfield Farmhouse and Steading				55°00′07″N 3°15′17″W	Category C(S)	3477	Upload Photo
High Street: Town Hall and Freestanding Lamps				54°59′14″N 3°15′52″W	Category B	21097	Upload another image
High Street: Annan Parish Church and Churchyard Boundary Walls and Gatepiers, (Church of Scotland)				54°59′15″N 3°15′30″W	Category A	21106	Upload another image See more images
High Street: Annan Parish Churchyard, Statue to Edward Irving				54°59′15″N 3°15′30″W	Category B	21107	Upload another image
Port Street, Viaduct				54°59′05″N 3°16′17″W	Category B	21110	Upload Photo
2, 4 Port Street				54°59′13″N 3°15′55″W	Category C(S)	21114	Upload Photo
20 Scott Street				54°59′11″N 3°15′14″W	Category B	21122	Upload Photo
1 Solway Street				54°59′12″N 3°15′22″W	Category C(S)	21123	Upload Photo
15 Bank Street, Erskine Church, Screen Walls and Gatepiers				54°59′12″N 3°15′44″W	Category B	21064	Upload another image
Bank Street, St Andrews Greenknowe Erskine Parish Church (Church Of Scotland)				54°59′11″N 3°15′42″W	Category B	21070	Upload another image
33 Butts Street and 39 English Street				54°59′22″N 3°15′37″W	Category B	21072	Upload Photo
14 Ednam Street				54°59′10″N 3°15′37″W	Category B	21081	Upload Photo
43, 45 High Street				54°59′13″N 3°15′48″W	Category B	21087	Upload Photo
Brydekirk Village, Brydekirk Bridge				55°01′22″N 3°16′26″W	Category A	3494	Upload another image
Cleuchead Bridge (Over Butcherbeck Burn)				55°01′16″N 3°15′52″W	Category B	3496	Upload Photo
Howes Cottage				54°59′25″N 3°16′20″W	Category B	3511	Upload Photo
Newbie Mains				54°58′11″N 3°17′35″W	Category C(S)	3517	Upload Photo
Warmanbie Lodge and Gatepiers				55°00′22″N 3°15′16″W	Category B	3483	Upload Photo
117, 119 High Street				54°59′14″N 3°15′35″W	Category B	21095	Upload Photo
High Street: Annan Old Churchyard, Walls and Gatepiers				54°59′15″N 3°15′51″W	Category B	21098	Upload another image
Port Street Quays				54°58′53″N 3°16′15″W	Category B	21109	Upload Photo
Port Street Warehouse opposite Welldale Mill				54°58′58″N 3°16′15″W	Category B	21119	Upload another image
8, 10 Bank Street				54°59′12″N 3°15′43″W	Category B	21069	Upload Photo
Ednam Street, Adult Training Centre (Former Academy) Boundary Wall And Gatepiers				54°59′11″N 3°15′37″W	Category B	21080	Upload Photo
Greencroft Wynd, Greencroft House (Crombie's Workshop)				54°59′10″N 3°15′47″W	Category B	21084	Upload another image
1, 3 High Street				54°59′13″N 3°15′55″W	Category B	21085	Upload Photo
Howes Farmhouse and Steading				54°59′27″N 3°16′20″W	Category B	3510	Upload Photo
Violetbank Cottage				54°59′35″N 3°16′11″W	Category C(S)	3480	Upload Photo
67, 69, 71 High Street and 1 Bank Street				54°59′14″N 3°15′44″W	Category B	21091	Upload Photo
77, 79, 81 High Street				54°59′14″N 3°15′42″W	Category C(S)	21093	Upload Photo
Long Meadow				54°58′54″N 3°15′53″W	Category C(S)	21108	Upload Photo
15 Port Street Albert Hall				54°59′09″N 3°15′56″W	Category B	21111	Upload another image
St John's Road: St John's Episcopal Church, Gates and Gatepiers				54°59′08″N 3°15′41″W	Category B	21120	Upload another image
6 Wellington Street				54°59′22″N 3°15′42″W	Category B	21129	Upload Photo
Annan Bridge (A75 over the River Annan)				54°59′14″N 3°15′57″W	Category A	21061	Upload another image
47, 49 High Street, Queensberry Arms Hotel				54°59′13″N 3°15′47″W	Category B	21088	Upload another image
Howes Scaur Farmhouse and Steading				54°59′33″N 3°16′35″W	Category C(S)	3512	Upload Photo
Hoddom Castle, East Lodge				55°02′29″N 3°18′40″W	Category B	3576	Upload another image
North Howes Barn and Former Bacon Factory				54°59′29″N 3°16′15″W	Category C(S)	3476	Upload Photo
Fairfield Place, West Side				54°59′16″N 3°15′46″W	Category C(S)	50030	Upload Photo
High Street, Summerhouse at rear of Queensberry Hotel				54°59′11″N 3°15′47″W	Category C(S)	21089	Upload Photo
28, 30 High Street, Annan Savings Bank				54°59′14″N 3°15′50″W	Category B	21099	Upload Photo
50, 52 High Street, Royal Bank of Scotland				54°59′15″N 3°15′48″W	Category C(S)	21100	Upload Photo
82 High Street, Buck Inn				54°59′15″N 3°15′41″W	Category C(S)	21105	Upload Photo
2 Bank Street				54°59′13″N 3°15′43″W	Category B	21067	Upload Photo
1 Downie's Wynd				54°59′13″N 3°15′41″W	Category B	21078	Upload Photo
Bonshaw Sundial				55°02′14″N 3°11′13″W	Category B	3490	Upload Photo
Bonshaw Mill				55°02′17″N 3°11′13″W	Category B	3491	Upload Photo
Limekilns Farmhouse				55°00′42″N 3°17′45″W	Category B	3513	Upload Photo
Milnfield Farmhouse and Steading				54°59′05″N 3°16′24″W	Category B	3515	Upload Photo
Outertown				55°00′31″N 3°14′51″W	Category B	3478	Upload Photo
Warmanbie				55°00′32″N 3°15′37″W	Category B	3481	Upload Photo

== Key ==
The scheme for classifying buildings in Scotland is:

- Category A: "buildings of national or international importance, either architectural or historic; or fine, little-altered examples of some particular period, style or building type."
- Category B: "buildings of regional or more than local importance; or major examples of some particular period, style or building type, which may have been altered."
- Category C: "buildings of local importance; lesser examples of any period, style, or building type, as originally constructed or moderately altered; and simple traditional buildings which group well with other listed buildings."

In March 2016 there were 47,288 listed buildings in Scotland. Of these, 8% were Category A, and 50% were Category B, with the remaining 42% being Category C.
