= County Buildings, Dumfries =

County building in Dumfries, Scotland

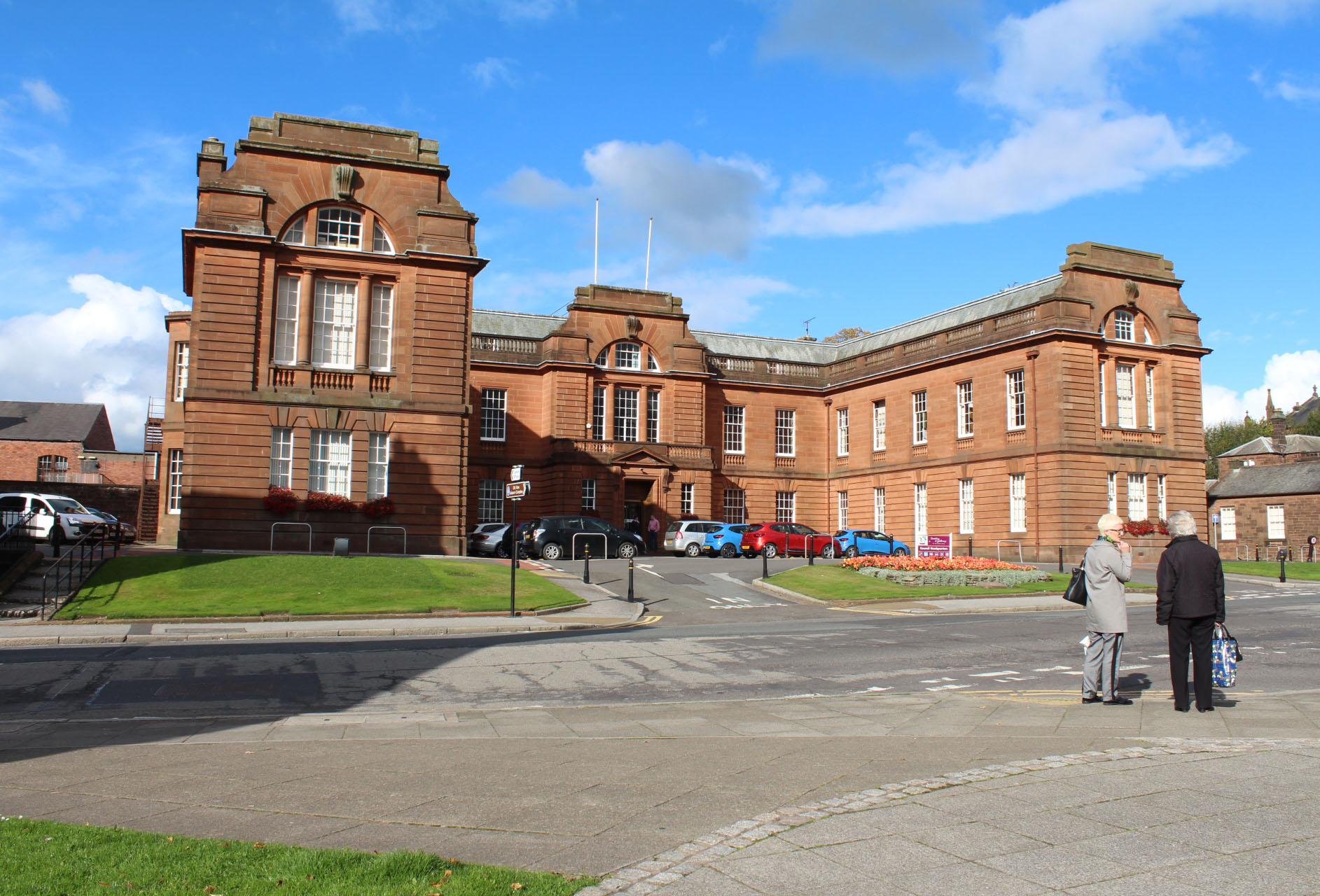
- County Buildings, Dumfries

- Shown in Dumfries and Galloway
- 55.0698°N 3.6067°W
- Location: English Street, Dumfries

History
- Built: 1914

Site notes
- Architect(s): John Dick Peddie and James Forbes Smith
- Architectural style: Renaissance Revival style

Listed Building – Category B
- Official name: Dumfries County Buildings, 113 English Street, Dumfries
- Designated: 21 August 1987
- Reference no.: LB26174

County Buildings is a municipal structure in English Street, Dumfries, Scotland. The structure, which is the headquarters of Dumfries and Galloway Council, is a Category B listed building.

== History ==
Following the implementation of the Local Government (Scotland) Act 1889, which established county councils in every county, the new county leaders decided to commission offices for Dumfriesshire County Council. The site they selected formed the storehouse for the local militia barracks. The main part of the old militia barracks, which was on an adjacent site to the southwest, was retained and incorporated into the new complex as additional office space.

The foundation stone for the new building was laid in September 1912. It was designed by John Dick Peddie and James Forbes Smith in the Renaissance Revival style, built in red ashlar stone at a cost of £21,000 and was completed in 1914. The design involved a symmetrical main frontage with seven bays facing onto English Street with the end bays projected forward to form wings; the central bay, which slightly projected forward, featured a doorway flanked by brackets supporting a pediment. On the first floor there was a balustrade and a three-light window flanked by pilasters, and, at attic level, there was a gable containing a Diocletian window and a blind panel. Internally, the principal room was the council chamber at the rear of the building.

Following the abolition of Dumfriesshire County Council, the complex became the headquarters of Dumfries and Galloway Regional Council in 1975, and then, after the introduction of unitary authorities, it became the headquarters of Dumfries and Galloway Council in 1996.

The Queensberry Monument, which was designed by Robert Adam in memory of Charles Douglas, 3rd Duke of Queensberry, was originally erected in Queensberry Square in 1780. It was moved to the forecourt of the County Buildings in 1934 but then returned to Queensberry Square as part of a project to pedestrianise the area in 1990.

== See also ==
- List of listed buildings in Dumfries
