= Stewartry of Annandale =

The Stewartry of Annandale was created in 1312, when the Lordship of Annandale, Scotland was granted to Thomas Randolph, 1st Earl of Moray. A steward was appointed to administer the area, and the office was known a "stewartry".

== Stewarts of Annandale ==
- Adam of Corry, c.1330
- Herbert Maxwell of Caerlaverock, 1409
- Herbert Maxwell, Lord Maxwell, 1440
- Robert Maxwell, Lord Maxwell, 1454
  - Aymer Gladstone – 1454 – deputy
  - Herbert Gladstone – 1454 – deputy
- John Maxwell, Lord Maxwell, 1460
- Patrick Andrew Wentworth Hope-Johnstone, 2019
