= Annandale and Eskdale =

Committee area in Dumfries and Galloway, Scotland

Coordinates: 55.160°N 3.221°W

- District
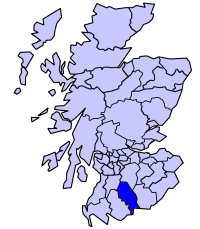
- History
  - Created: 16 May 1975
  - Abolished: 31 March 1996
  - Succeeded by: Dumfries and Galloway
  - HQ: Annan
- Contained within
  - Region: Dumfries and Galloway

Annandale and Eskdale is a committee area in Dumfries and Galloway, Scotland. It covers the areas of Annandale and Eskdale, the straths of the River Annan and the River Esk respectively. From 1975 until 1996 it was a local government district.

== History ==
The two straths of Eskdale and Annandale had each been medieval provinces of Scotland, with Annandale being a stewartry and Eskdale a lordship. The provinces were gradually eclipsed in importance by the shires as the main unit of local administration, with Annandale and Eskdale coming to be seen as two of the three divisions of Dumfriesshire, the other being Nithsdale. Dumfriesshire was administered by commissioners of supply from 1667 and by a county council from 1890. The hereditary jurisdictions of Eskdale and Annandale ended with the Heritable Jurisdictions (Scotland) Act 1746.

A local government district called Annandale and Eskdale was created on 16 May 1975 under the Local Government (Scotland) Act 1973, which established a two-tier structure of local government across Scotland comprising upper-tier regions and lower-tier districts. Annandale and Eskdale was one of four districts created within the region of Dumfries and Galloway. The district covered the eastern part of Dumfriesshire, covering the whole area of ten former districts and part of an eleventh, which were all abolished at the same time:

- Annan Burgh
- Annan District
- Dumfries District (parishes of Dalton and Lochmaben, rest went to Nithsdale)
- Gretna District
- Langholm Burgh
- Langholm District
- Lochmaben Burgh
- Lockerbie Burgh
- Lockerbie District
- Moffat Burgh
- Moffat District

For lieutenancy purposes, the last lord-lieutenant of the county of Dumfriesshire was made lord-lieutenant for the combined area of Annandale and Eskdale and the neighbouring district of Nithsdale when the reforms came into effect in 1975.

Further local government reform in 1996 under the Local Government etc. (Scotland) Act 1994 saw the four districts of Dumfries and Galloway abolished, with Dumfries and Galloway Council taking over their functions. The council continues to use the former Annandale and Eskdale district as the basis of an area committee, alongside committees for the other three abolished districts of Nithsdale, Stewartry and Wigtown, subject to some adjustments of boundaries where ward boundaries no longer follow the pre-1996 district boundaries. The Dumfries lieutenancy area continues to cover the combined area of the pre-1996 Annandale and Eskdale and Nithsdale districts.

== Political control ==
The first election to the district council was held in 1974, initially operating as a shadow authority alongside the outgoing authorities until it came into its powers on 16 May 1975. Political control of the council from 1975 was as follows:

Party in control	Years
Independent	1975–1988
No overall control	1988–1992
Liberal Democrats	1992–1996

== Premises ==
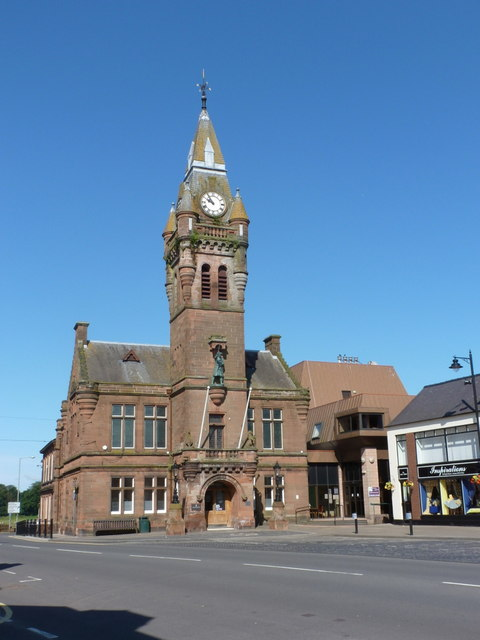
Annan Town Hall with the council offices being the modern extension to the right.

The council was based at the District Council Chambers in Annan, which formed part of Annan Town Hall. The town hall had originally been built between 1875 and 1878. The council built itself a large extension to the north of the town hall alongside Battery Street, with its main entrance to the right of the old town hall. Since the council's abolition in 1996 the building has been an area office of Dumfries and Galloway Council.

== Places in Annandale and Eskdale ==
- Annan
- Canonbie
- Ecclefechan
- Gretna
- Gretna Green
- Langholm
- Lockerbie
- Lochmaben
- Moffat

== See also ==
- Subdivisions of Scotland
- Chapelcross nuclear power station
