= Forestry in Scotland =

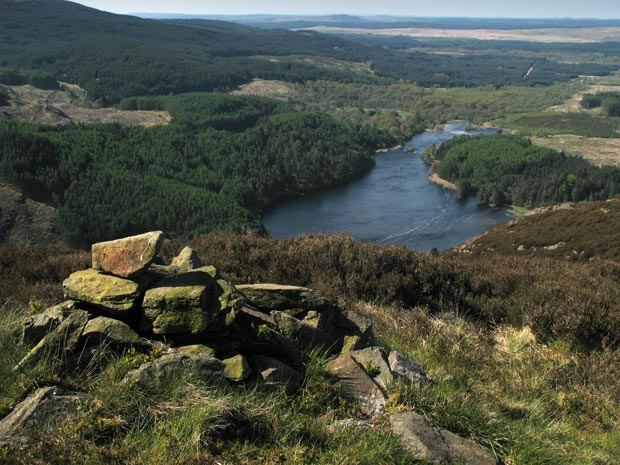
Conifer plantations surround Loch Trool in the Galloway Forest Park.

Scotland is ideal for tree growth, thanks to its mild winters, plentiful rainfall, fertile soil and hill-sheltered topography. As of 2019 about 18.5% of the country was wooded. Although this figure is well below the European Union (EU) average of 43%, it represents a significant increase compared to the figure of 100 years previously: in 1919 (at the end of the Great War) it was estimated that only 5% of the country's total land area was covered in forest. The Scottish Government's Draft Climate Change Plan has set an aim of increasing coverage to 21% of Scotland by 2032, with the rate of afforestation rising to 15,000 hectares per year by 2024.

Approximately 4,700 km^{2} of Scotland's forests and woodlands are publicly owned by the Scottish Government via Forestry and Land Scotland, and these are termed the National Forest Estate. As of 2015, forestry contributed almost £1 billion to the Scottish economy, and the industry employed over 25,000 people.

== Historical background ==
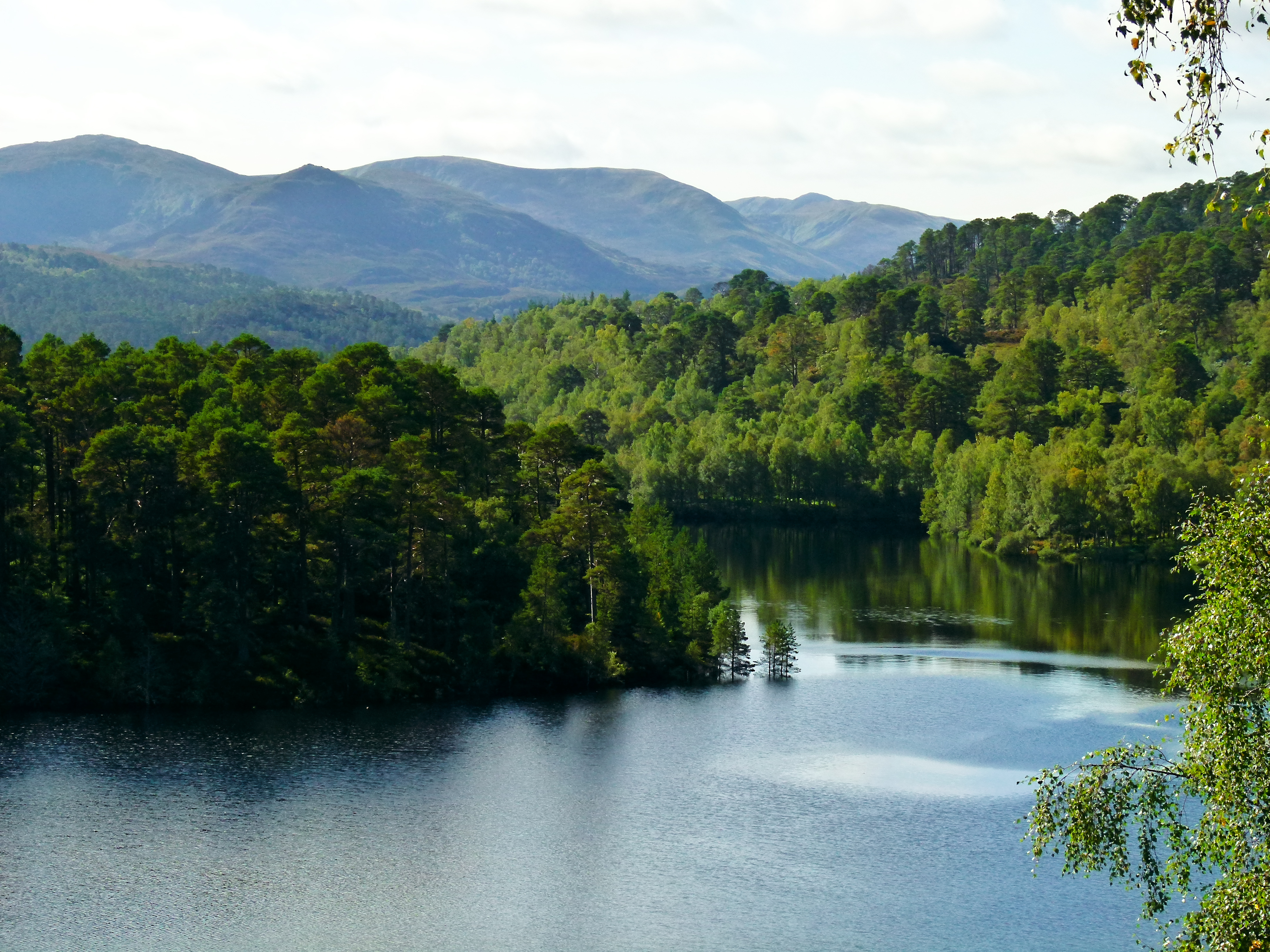
Caledonian Forest in Glen Affric

Throughout most of Scottish history, people have most commonly created farmland at the expense of forest. Furthermore, variations in the Holocene climate have led to significant changes in the ranges of many species. This makes it complex to estimate the likely extent of natural forest cover. Prior to human intervention it is likely that Scotland's woodlands consisted chiefly of Scots pine and birch in the north and east, with Atlantic oakwoods in the warmer and wetter areas to the south and west. The Caledonian Forest is the name given to the former (ancient old-growth) temperate rainforest of Scotland. The Scots pines of the Caledonian Forest are directly descended from the first pines to arrive in Scotland following the Late Glacial; arriving about 7000 BC. The forest reached its maximum extent about 5000 BC, after which the Scottish climate became wetter and windier. This changed climate reduced the extent of the forest significantly by 2000 BC. From that date, human actions (including the grazing effects of sheep and deer) led to a continued reduction in the amount of forest.

In the 18th century, during the early stages of the Industrial Revolution, wood was vital for many industries, in particular the smelting of iron. Oak was especially favoured for this use, being processed into the charcoal used in blast furnaces. To provide the wood required for charcoal, woodlands were managed using a technique known as coppicing, which involved repeatedly harvesting branches from trees, each time cutting them down to ground level and allowing new shoots to grow. The preserved Bonawe Iron Furnace provides a particularly prominent example of an 18th-century Highland iron smelting site, whilst the nearby forest at Glen Nant was one of many woods across Argyll that supplied the oak required: now a national nature reserve, Glen Nant provides a good example of woodland managed by coppicing.

The United Kingdom's supply of timber was severely depleted during World War I, when imports were difficult. The Forestry Commission was established in 1919 to ensure Britain retained a strategic reserve of timber. The Commission's board was initially made up of eight forestry commissioners and was chaired by Simon Fraser, 14th Lord Lovat from 1919 to 1927. Lovat had extensive landholdings in Scotland, and it was in the Highlands that he and other Scottish landowners such as Sir John Stirling-Maxwell conceived of the scheme of land-settlement allied to forestry. As first chairman of the Commission Lovat was able to put into practice his ‘long cherished dream’ of repopulating hill country, thanks to his good contacts in government. The scheme accordingly went ahead and created smallholdings in the new forests, of approximately ten acres (4.0 hectares), let for £15 a year. Originally 150 days work was provided in the forests, but “in practice, of course, these smallholdings attracted the cream of our men whom we were glad to employ on fulltime...” Existing and often derelict agricultural dwellings were adapted and new ones built to a small number of basic designs. The scheme “was never a directly economic proposition, but in the pre-war days when motor traffic was lacking and it was much more important than today to have a solid caucus of skilled woodmen [sic] living in the forests, the indirect benefits were inestimable. The holdings were a great success, and filled a genuine need in the countryside...” The number of smallholdings built slowed down after the Great Depression, was revived by the Special Areas programme of 1934 onwards, but then was virtually ended by the Second World War, after which the policy shifted to the building of houses without holdings.

During the Second World War timber was again in great demand, and there was a steep increase in the amount of timber extracted from Scotland's woods. Specialist battalions were recruited to work in the forests, including the Women's Timber Corps, groups of conscientious objectors, and workers from Belize (the British Honduran Forestry Unit). Following the war the Forestry Commission strove to replenish the lost woodland, making increased use of mechanisation to assist in this task.

The Forestry Act 1945 rescinded the Forestry Commission's power to acquire and hold land, transferring its Scottish lands to the Scottish Office. The commission was henceforth subject to the directions of the Department of Agriculture for Scotland, thus starting devolution of forestry policy to Scotland. Following the introduction of political devolution forestry was not a reserved matter, and as such the Forestry Commission had to report to the Scottish Parliament on Scottish forestry, the Welsh Assembly in respect of Wales, and the UK Government in respect of England and certain international issues such as plant health. This was achieved by splitting responsibility for forests by national borders, resulting in the creation of Forestry Commission Scotland, and equivalent bodies for England and Wales in 2003. These bodies existed as sub-departments of the Forestry Commission of Great Britain. On 1 April 2013 Forestry Commission Wales was merged into Natural Resources Wales: from then until April 2019 the Forestry Commission was thus responsible only for English and Scottish forests. In April 2019 two new bodies, Forestry and Land Scotland (FLS) (Scottish Gaelic: Coilltearachd agus Fearann Alba) and Scottish Forestry (Scottish Gaelic: Coilltearachd na h-Alba), were established to take over the responsibilities of Forestry Commission Scotland, which was dissolved.

== Species and biodiversity ==
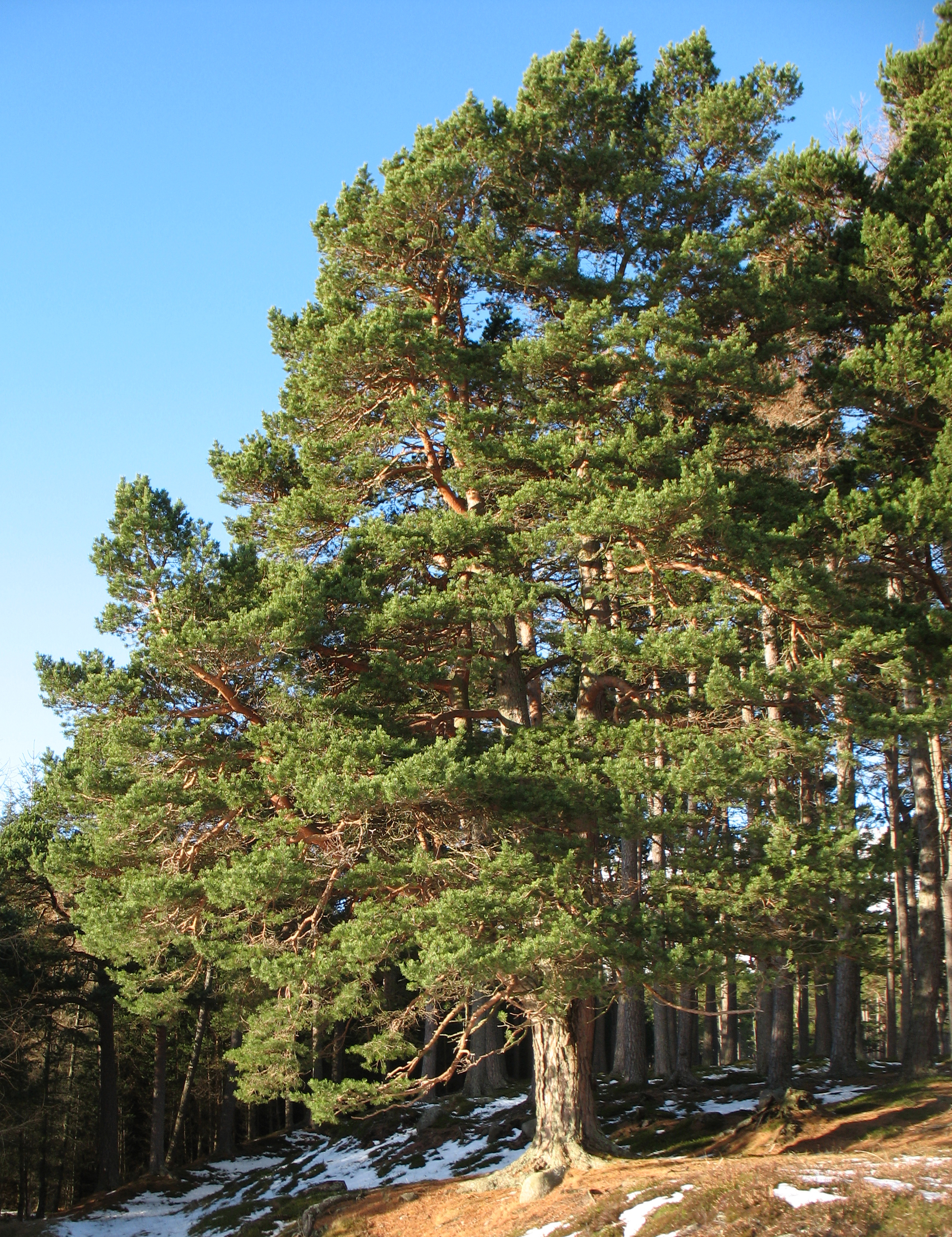
Native Scots pine at Glenmuick

Only thirty-one species of deciduous tree and shrub are native to Scotland, including ten willows, four whitebeams and three birch and cherry. The Scots pine and Common Juniper are the only coniferous trees definitely native to Scotland with Yew a possible contender.

The Arran Whitebeams are species unique to the Isle of Arran: Sorbus arranensis and the Cut-leaved Whitebeam (S. pseudofennica) are amongst the most endangered tree species in the world if rarity is measured by numbers alone. Only 236 S. pseudofennica and 283 S. arranensis were recorded as mature trees in 1980. The trees developed in a highly complex fashion involving the Rock Whitebeam (S. rupicola), which is found on nearby Holy Isle but not Arran, interbreeding with the Rowan (S. aucuparia) to produce the new species. In 2007 it was announced that two specimens of a third new hybrid, the Catacol Whitebeam (S. pseudomeinichii) had been discovered by researchers on Arran. This tree is a cross between the native Rowan and S. pseudofennica.

In 2002 it was estimated that 81.6% of Scotland's woodland was coniferous, with much of this consisting of plantations of non-native conifers. The most commonly planted tree species was Sitka spruce, which covered almost 48.2% of the all forest land in the country. Other commonly planted non-native trees included lodgepole pine (11.1%), larches (5.9%) and Norway spruce (3.2%). The native Scots pine covered 11.6% of forest land, and the total amount of native woodland was estimated as being 3,980 km^{2}, with around 4,000 ha of new native woodland being created each year. The Native Woodland Survey of Scotland, completed between late 2006 and late 2012, found that of Scotland's native woodland, 29% could be classified as "upland birchwoods", whilst native pinewoods comprised 28%. Wet woodland comprised 14% of all native woodland, whilst "lowland mixed deciduous woodland" comprised 8%, and upland oakwoods comprised 6%.

Stirling University have recorded the presence of over 1000 species in Scottish forests, many of which are those most closely associated with Scotland such as pine marten, twinflower, crested tit, Scottish crossbill, black grouse, capercaillie and red squirrel.

== Stewardship and management ==
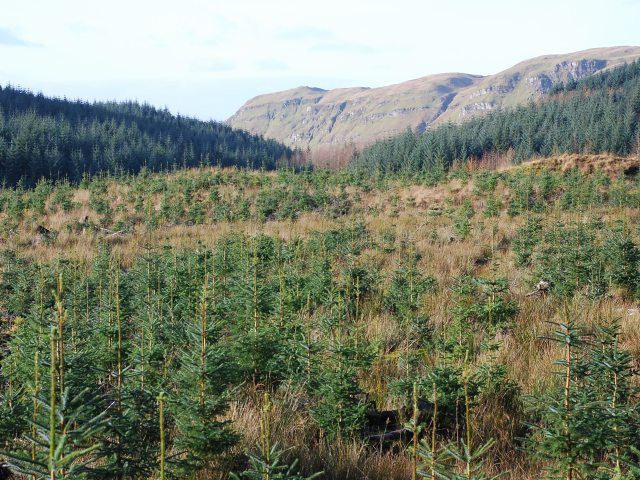
New forestry plantation at Dalavich in Argyll and Bute

Two bodies are responsible for forestry in Scotland. Both bodies are executive agencies of the Scottish Government, operating at arm's length from the Scottish Government:

- Scottish Forestry is responsible for regulation, policy and support to landowners.
- Forestry and Land Scotland (FLS) is responsible for the national forest estate, including unforested land within this portfolio, and to produce and supply timber. Within this they are expected to enhance biodiversity, increase public access to the outdoors, encourage tourism and support the rural economy. FLS is regulated by Scottish Forestry.

In addition to regulatory functions in Scotland, Scottish Forestry is also responsible for management of the UK Forestry Standard and the Woodland Carbon Code and for provision of economic advice on forestry: it undertakes these activities on behalf of Scotland, England and Wales under cross-border arrangements with the Forestry Commission (England) and Natural Resources Wales. Under these arrangements Wales will co-ordinate the commissioning, co-ordination and programme management of forestry research, with Forest Research remaining a separate executive agency of the Forestry Commissioners, whilst the residual Forestry Commission (now covering only England for most purposes) will continue to be responsible on behalf of the whole of the UK for co-ordinating international forestry policy support and certain plant health functions in respect of trees and forestry. Scottish Forestry is also responsible for the appointment of the Chief Forester for Scotland, who acts as the Head of Profession for forestry staff across the public sector. As of October 2025 the Chief Forester for Scotland is Helen McKay, who was appointed in August 2020.

Much of the National Forest Estate is managed to encourage tourism and recreation, with facilities such as car park, picnic areas, paths and mountain bike trails. Examples include the six forest parks, and the mountain biking venues of the 7stanes.

In February 2019 the Scottish Government published a forestry strategy that identified six key priorities for the period 2019-29:

- Ensuring forests and woodlands are sustainably managed
- Expanding the area of forests and woodlands, recognising wider land-use objectives
- Improving efficiency and productivity, and developing markets
- Increasing the adaptability and resilience of forests and woodlands
- Enhancing the environmental benefits provided by forests and woodlands
- Engaging more people, communities and businesses in the creation, management and use of forests and woodlands

The strategy aims to increasing forest coverage to 21% of the total area of Scotland by 2032, with the target rate of afforestation rising from 10,000 hectares per year in 2018 to 15,000 hectares per year by 2024. Within this, the government is seeking to establish 3000–5000 hectares per year of new native woodland.

== Notable individual trees ==
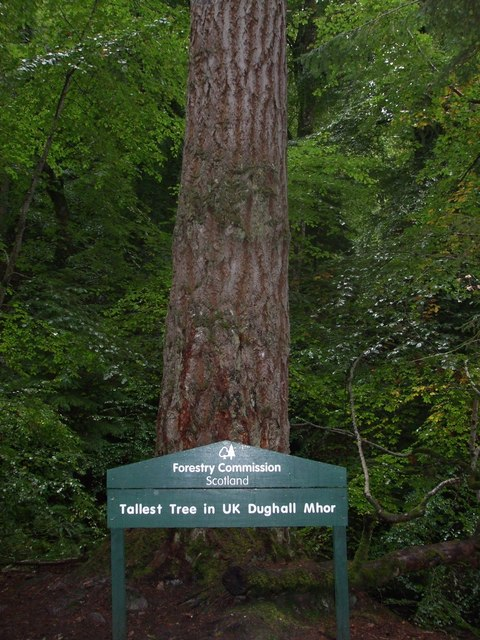
Dughall Mhòr in Reelig Glen was formerly thought to be the tallest tree in the UK.

Non-native conifers are the tallest trees now found in Scotland. At 64.3 metres (211 ft), a Grand Fir planted beside Loch Fyne, Argyll in the 1870s was named as the UK's tallest tree in 2011, however it has since been surpassed by a Douglas fir in Reelig Glen near Inverness, which is 66.4 metres (218 ft) high. Another Douglas Fir located in Reelig Glen had been considered to be the tallest tree in Britain until a survey undertaken by Sparsholt College in 2009; this tree, which is named Dùghall Mòr (Scottish Gaelic: "big dark stranger") reaches just over 62 metres (203 ft) in height. The Sparsholt survey named the Stronardron Douglas fir which grows near Dunans Castle in Argyll as Scotland's tallest tree at 63.79 metres (209.3 ft), with the Diana's Grove Grand Fir at Blair Castle, which was measured at 62.7 metres (206 ft), being the next highest. This survey concluded that the Hermitage Douglas Fir near Dunkeld came next in height, standing at 61.31 metres (201 ft).

The Fortingall Yew in Glen Lyon is generally thought to be the Scotland's oldest tree, with an estimated age of between 3000 and 5000 years.

The Meikleour Beech Hedges in Perth and Kinross were planted in the autumn of 1745 by Jean Mercer and her husband, Robert Murray Nairne. This European beech hedge, which is 530 metres (0.33 mi) in length, reaches 30 metres (98 ft) in height and is noted in the Guinness World Records as the tallest and longest hedge on Earth. It is usually trimmed once every ten years, although the most recent trim, which took place in late 2019, was the first in almost 20 years.

== See also ==
- Afforestation in Scotland
- Caledonian Forest
- Woodland Carbon Code
- Forestry in the United Kingdom
