= List of forests managed by the Forestry Commission =

Prior to 2013 the Forestry Commission managed about one million hectares of land across Great Britain, including 660,000 hectares of forest in Scotland, 250,000 hectares in England and 126,000 hectares in Wales. In 2013 the Commission's forests in Wales were transferred to Natural Resources Wales, whilst Forestry and Land Scotland was established in Scotland in 2019 to own and manage Scotland's National Forest Estate.

These forests range from small scale urban forests to many of the largest forests in Britain. The Forestry Commission was set up in 1919 to carry out afforestation programmes across Britain for timber production. It is also responsible for maintaining and developing recreational facilities within the forests in England.

== Forests in England ==
Name	Location	Size (hectares)	Description	References
Alice Holt Forest	Hampshire	850	A former Royal forest, Alice Holt is a multi-purpose forest. It is the headquarters for Forest Research and was the first Research Forest in Britain.	
Bedford Purlieus	Cambridgeshire	208	Bedford Purlieus has been a nature reserve since 2000. It was once part of the Royal forest of Rockingham. The forest houses a large number of different plants and insect species.	
Bedgebury Pinetum	Kent	320	Bedgebury Pinetum has the largest collection of Conifers in the world. It was started in the 1840s and experienced expansion under the control of the Forestry Commission and Kew Gardens from 1925. The Commission took sole ownership of the Pinetum in 1965.	
Bernwood Forest	Oxfordshire	136	A former royal hunting forest, Bernwood is a Site of Special Scientific Interest due to its diverse range of butterfly species.	
Cannock Forest	Staffordshire	2300	Cannock Forest is within the Area of Outstanding Natural Beauty of Cannock Chase. The Forestry Commission uses the forest for commercial and recreational purposes.	
Cardinham Woods	Cornwall	260	Cardinham Woods have been managed by the Forestry Commission since 1922. The Commission maintains the woods for commercial purposes and general recreation.	
Neroche Forest	Somerset	1000	Neroche Forest is within the Blackdown Hills. The forest is home to Castle Neroche and one of the Forestry Commission's forest school projects.	
Dalby Forest	North Yorkshire	3440	Dalby Forest is within the North York Moors national park. It is home to several rare insect species.	
Delamere Forest	Cheshire	972	Delamere is the largest forest in Cheshire, though was once part of the larger Forests of Mara and Mondrem. The Sandstone Trail passes through the forest.	
Dunwich Forest	Suffolk	270	Dunwich Forest was primarily a commercial coniferous forest until 2006, when the Forestry Commission and partner organisations began to convert it to mixed woodland and heathland.	
Dymock Woods	Gloucestershire	506	Dymock Woods contains a Site of Special Scientific Interest and some ancient woodland.	
Forest of Bere	Hampshire		The Forestry Commission manages the remnants of the former royal forest of Bere. The Forest of Bere was one of the forests passed to the Commission upon its establishment in 1919. It has been a major timber forest, providing wood for shipbuilding and resulting in fluctuating forest cover.	
Forest of Dean	Gloucestershire	12000	The Forest of Dean is an ancient forest. It contains the largest number of ancient oak trees anywhere in Britain.	
Friston Forest	East Sussex	850	Friston Forest contains many walking and cycling routes. It is in the South Downs and is home to some rare butterflies.	
Gravetye Estate	West Sussex	611	The Gravetye Estate consists of multiple woodlands of both broadleaved trees and conifers. The forest surrounds Gravetye Manor, a privately owned hotel and restaurant.	
Grizedale Forest	Cumbria	2447	Grizedale Forest is within the Lake District National Park, near Windermere. The forest is mainly recreational, with several biking trails and waymarked paths.	
Guisborough Forest	North Yorkshire	468	Guisborough Forest is within the boundaries of the North York Moors.	
Haldon Forest	Devon	3500	Haldon Forest Park provides a habitat for over 30 butterfly species and many birds of prey. The Forestry Commission maintains several walking an cycling trails across the forest.	
Hamsterley Forest	County Durham	2000	The Forestry Commission claims that Hamsterley Forest is one of the most popular attractions in County Durham. The Forest has a large number of cycling and walking trails.	
Kesteven Forest	Lincolnshire		Kesteven Forest covers several woods, including the Bourne Woods.	
Kielder Forest	Northumberland	65000	Kielder is the largest artificial forest in England and remains one of the Forestry Commission's major timber producing forests. The forest has been under the management of the Commission since it was planted in the 1920s.	
Mortimer Forest	Shropshire	1029	Mortimer Forest originally provided firewood for Ludlow Castle. It now contains several biking trails and walking routes as well as a permanent orienteering course.	
New Forest	Hampshire	37677	The New Forest is an ancient forest that was planted around 1000 CE. Much of the forest has been within the New Forest National Park since 2005.	
Parkhurst Forest	Isle of Wight	395	Parkhurst Forest is one of the oldest forests in England. It is home to rare plant and tree species as well as some less common insects.	
Queen Elizabeth Country Park	Hampshire	570	Queen Elizabeth Country Park lies within the South Downs. It is managed by the Forestry Commission on behalf of Hampshire County Council.	
Rendlesham Forest	Suffolk	1500	Rendlesham Forest is best known for the Rendlesham Forest Incident. This incident provided the inspiration for the UFO themed recreational facilities.	
Rockingham Forest	Northamptonshire		Rockingham Forest was a royal hunting forest. The Commission originally expanded the forest using fast growing conifers, but has begun a project to convert much of this to mixed woodland.	
Salcey Forest	Northamptonshire	495	Salcey Forest has a 20 metre high "Tree Top Walkway". The forest is also made up of ancient woodland including 600-year-old oak trees.	
Sheffield Forest	East Sussex	197	Sheffield Forest is located within the High Weald AONB.	
St Leonard's Forest	West Sussex	289	St Leonard's Forest is at the western end of the Wealden Forest Ridge which runs from Horsham to Tonbridge, and is part of the High Weald Area of Outstanding Natural Beauty.	
Savernake Forest	Wiltshire	1100	Savernake Forest is privately owned and has been managed by the Forestry Commission since 1939 on a 999-year lease. The Commission has logging rights and operates a campsite within the forest.	
Sherwood Forest	Nottinghamshire	1340	Sherwood Forest is an ancient forest known for its connections with Robin Hood. It is a former royal hunting forest that is mostly managed by the Forestry Commission.	
Sherwood Pines	Nottinghamshire	1925	The forestry commission obtained a 999-year lease in 1925. The forest also has a visitor centre and forest activities.	
Thetford Forest	East Anglia	19000	Thetford Forest was created by the Forestry Commission in 1922 for commercial logging. Recreational facilities, such as waymarked paths and cycle trails have been developed since.	
Wendover Woods	Buckinghamshire	325	Wendover Woods are on the Chiltern Hills. The woods are made up of a mixture of coniferous and broad leafed trees.	
Westonbirt Arboretum	Gloucestershire	250	The Westonbirt Arboretum was established in 1829 and given to the Forestry Commission in 1956. The arboretum contains approximately 16000 trees from around the world.	
Whinlatter Forest	Cumbria	1226	The Forestry Commission claims that Whinlatter Forest is "the only true Mountain Forest" in England. The forest is 790 metres above sea level and is located within the Lake District National Park. It has been mostly used as a recreational forest since 1965.	
Wyre Forest	Worcestershire / Shropshire	2600	Wyre Forest is among the largest of Britain's ancient forests. Large parts of the forest are within a Site of Special Scientific Interest.	

== Forests in Scotland ==
Since 2019 the National Forest Estate in Scotland has been managed by Forestry and Land Scotland and the table below may not be up to date.

Name	Location	Size (hectares)	Description	References
Achnashellach Forest	Scottish Highlands		Achnashellach Forest does not have recreational facilities that many other Forestry Commission forests have. It is in a remote part of the Scottish Highlands and is fairly mountainous. The Forest was originally part of a Caledonian Forest.	
Argyll Forest Park	Argyll and Bute	24,281	In 1935, Argyll Forest became the first Forest Park in Britain. It lies on the border between the Scottish Highlands and the Scottish Lowlands.	
Craik Forest	Scottish Borders		Craik Forest is primarily a commercial forest with timber being processed at facilities nearby. There are some recreational facilities within the forest.	
Dalbeattie Forest	Dumfries and Galloway	1100	Dalbeattie Forest has primarily been a commercial forest, though the Forestry Commission has worked with local organisations to expand recreational facilities. The forest now hosts one of the 7stanes biking trails.	
Forest of Ae	Dumfries and Galloway	9100	Ae was created by the Forestry Commission soon after it was established. While it is mainly a commercial forest, it is also one of the 7stanes forests.	
Galloway Forest Park	Dumfries and Galloway	77700	Galloway Forest is the largest forest in Britain. In 2009 it became the first Dark Sky Park in the UK.	
Garscadden Wood	Glasgow	16.94	Garscadden Wood lies within the Drumchapel Woodlands, slightly north west of Glasgow.	
Glen Affric	Highland	9000	Glen Affric is home to a large area of Caledonian Forest and is designated a national nature reserve.	
Glencoe Lochan	Highland		Glencoe Lochan forest was established by 1st Baron Strathcona in the 19th century. It is a coniferous forest.	
Glenmore Forest Park	Highland	3500	Genmore contains some caledoninan woodland. It became the second Forest Park to be created by the Commission in 1948.	
Knapdale Forest	Argyll and Bute	19800	Knapdale has a colony of beavers as part of the Scottish Beaver Trial.	
Mabie Forest	Dumfries and Galloway		Mabie Forest has been owned by the Forestry Commission since 1943. It has become a recreational forest, with walking routes and 7stanes biking trails.	
Queen Elizabeth Forest Park	Stirling	16780	The Queen Elizabeth Forest Park consists of several forests. It became a forest park in 1953 as part of the coronation of Queen Elizabeth II.	
Tay Forest Park	Perthshire		The Tay Forest Park is made up of several different forests. The forest has been visited by several royals, including Queen Victoria and Queen Isabella of Scotland.	
Tweed Valley Forest Park	Scottish Borders	6800	The Tweed Valley Forest Park is made up of seven forests around the Scottish Borders. Glentress and Innerleithen forests are part of the 7stanes biking trail project.	

== Forests in Wales ==
Since 2013 the Public Forest Estate in Wales has been managed by Natural Resources Wales and the table below may not be up to date.

Name	Location	Size (hectares)	Description	References
Afan Forest Park	Neath Port Talbot	11000	Afan Forest Park covers the Afan Valley and the surrounding area. The forest park contains several long distance cycle routes.	
Beddgelert Forest	Snowdonia	700		
Brechfa Forest	Carmarthenshire	6500	Brechfa Forest has been a mixed commercial and recreational forest since it was placed under the management of the Forestry Commission in 1919. The forest contains ancient woodland and was a royal hunting forest.	
Coed-y-Brenin	Snowdonia	3600	Coed-y-Brenin has several mountain bike trails and has hosted races since 1991.	
Cwmcarn Forest	Caerphilly	1200	The Forestry Commission created Cwmcarn Forest in 1922 over a former colliery.	
Dyfnant Forest	Powys	2430	Dyfnant Forest has five horse riding trails, known as the "rainbow trails".	
Fforest Fawr	Powys		Fforest Fawr was the first Geopark in Wales. It lies within the Brecon Beacons National Park.	
Glasfynydd Forest	Carmarthenshire / Powys		Glasfynydd Forest surrounds the Usk Reservoir and is mainly a coniferous forest.	
Gwydir Forest	Snowdonia	7250	Gwydir Forest is one of several forests that the Commission planted across Welsh Mining areas. Gwydir now has several recreational facilities including walking and cycling routes.	
Hafren Forest	Powys	13000	The forest is named after the River Severn (Afron Hafren) as the river rises close to the forest border. The Forestry Commission planted the forest in 1937 as a source of timber.	
Hiraethog Forest	Denbighshire	6000	Hiraethog Forest is a large commercial pine forest in North Wales. Recreational facilities and Red Squirrels lie within Clocaenog Forest.	
Newborough Forest	Anglesey	700	The Forestry Commission planted Newborough Forest in 1947 as part of its post-war afforestation efforts. It was primarily to stabilise the sand dunes near Newborough.	
Radnor Forest	Powys	1500	Radnor Forest is mostly a commercial coniferous forest managed by the Forestry Commission. It has some waymarked footpaths and access for horse riding.	
Wentwood	Newport / Monmouthshire		Wentwood is managed by several organisations, with the Forestry Commission carrying out commercial forestry operations in much of the Forest. The forest is an ancient forest, with much of the area replanted by the Commission with conifers.	

== See also ==
- Forestry Commission
- List of Forestry Commission land on the Isle of Wight
