= Forestry in the United Kingdom =

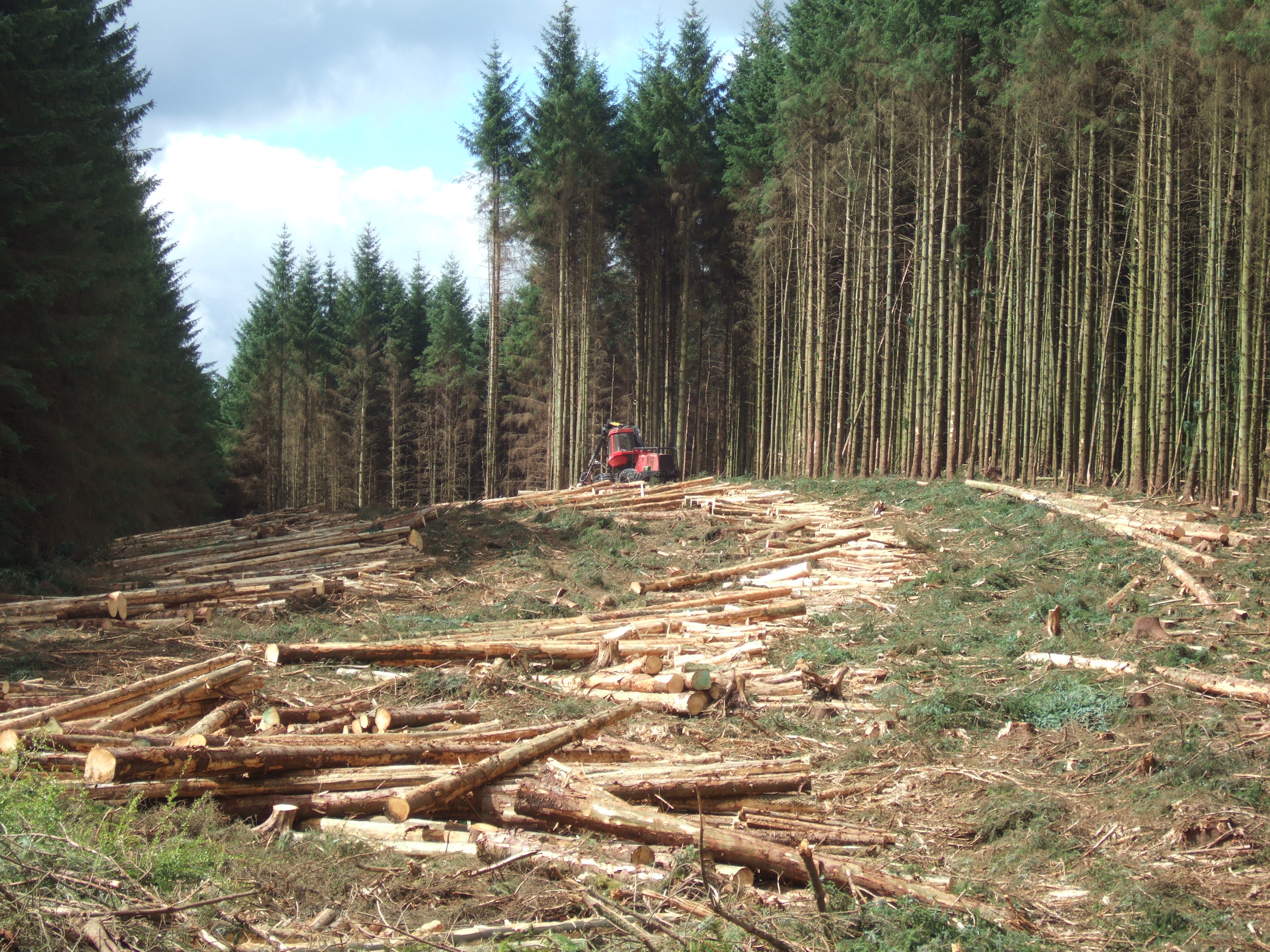
Timber harvesting in Kielder Forest, Northumberland, England

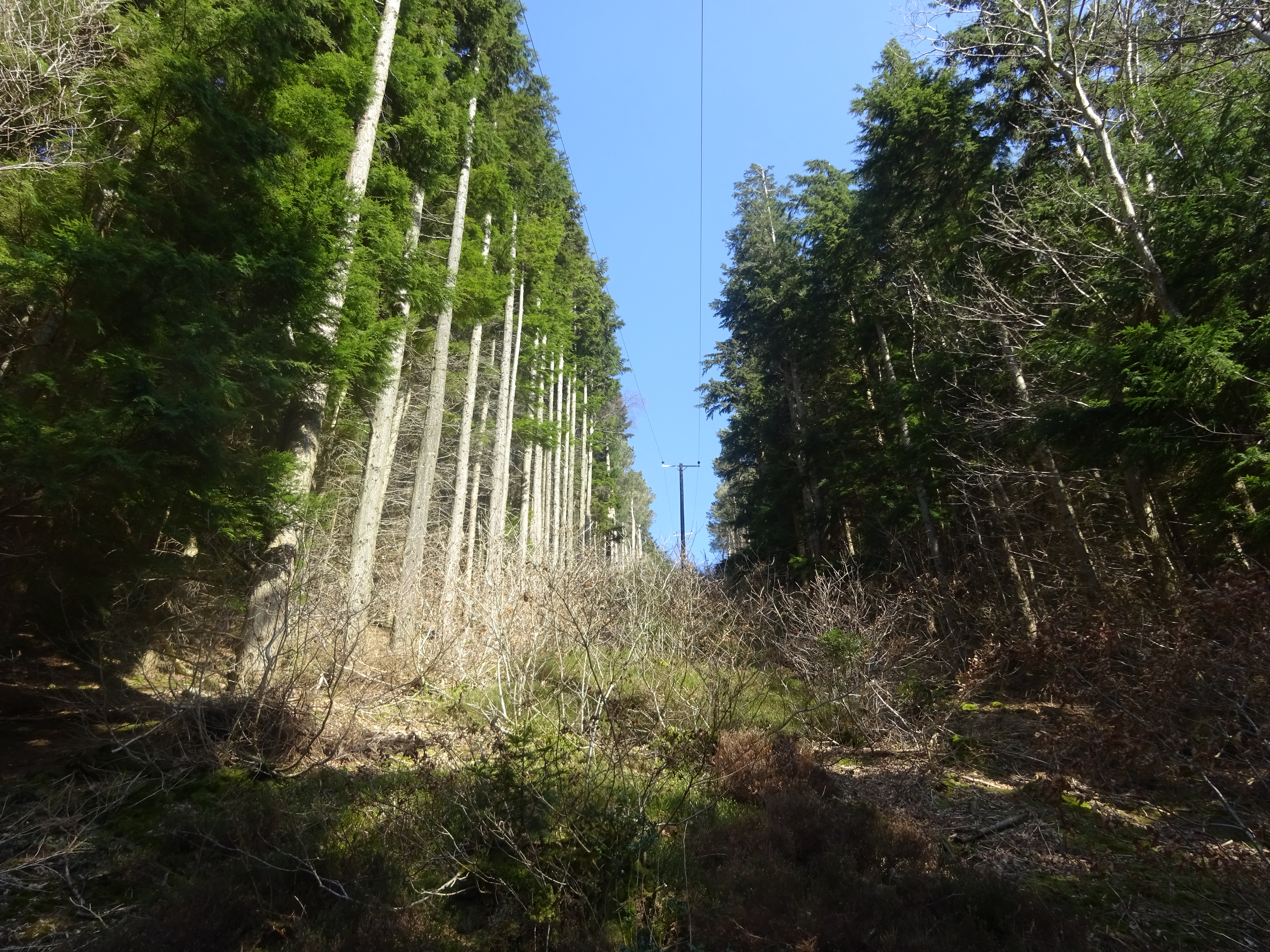
Electricity wires cut through the forest at Coed Plas-y-Nant (Clwydian Range AONB), Ruthin, Wales

The United Kingdom, being in the British Isles, is ideal for tree growth, thanks to its mild winters, plentiful rainfall, fertile soil and hill-sheltered topography. In the absence of people, much of Great Britain would be covered with mature oaks as well as savannah-type of plains, except for Scotland. Although conditions for forestry are good, trees face threats from fungi, parasites and pests. Nowadays, about 13% of Britain's land surface is wooded. European countries average 39%, but this varies widely from 1% (Malta) to 66% (Finland). As of 2021, government plans call for 30,000 hectares to be reforested each year. Efforts to reach these targets have attracted criticism for planting non-native trees, or trees that are out of place for their surroundings, leading to ecological changes.

The UK's supply of timber was depleted during the First and Second World Wars, when imports were difficult, and the forested area bottomed out at under 5% of Britain's land surface in 1919. That year, the Forestry Commission was established to produce a strategic reserve of timber.

Of the 31,380 square kilometres (12,120 sq mi) of forest in Britain, around 30% is publicly owned and 70% is in the private sector. (Note: In fact, this is not easy to establish. There is no complete register of who owns land in the United Kingdom. HM Land Registry records purchases by way of conveyance, but where land has not changed hands since the Land Registry was established in 1862, no records exist. Two attempts have been made to take a complete census of ownership (the Domesday Book in 1086 and a census in 1873) but both contain significant omissions and are extremely dated besides; and much of the forested land is on long-established estates where ownership is not recorded on any register that can be examined. Often-quoted figures for England come from the Forestry Commission, National Inventory of Woodland and Trees (1998), which claims the breakdown is as follows: Private: Personal: 47.1% Business (including pension funds) 14.3% Public: Forestry Commission 21.8% Other central government: 2.7% Local authority 6% Charity 6.7% Forestry or timber business 0.7%) More than 40,000 people work on this land. Conifers account for around one half (51%) of the UK woodland area, although this proportion varies from around one quarter (26%) in England to around three quarters (74%) in Scotland. Britain's native tree flora comprises 32 species, of which 29 are broadleaves.

The UK's industry and populace uses at least 50 million tonnes of timber a year. More than 75% of this is softwood, and British forests cannot supply the demand; in fact, less than 10% of the timber used in Britain is home-grown. Paper and paper products make up more than half the wood consumed in Britain by volume.

== History ==
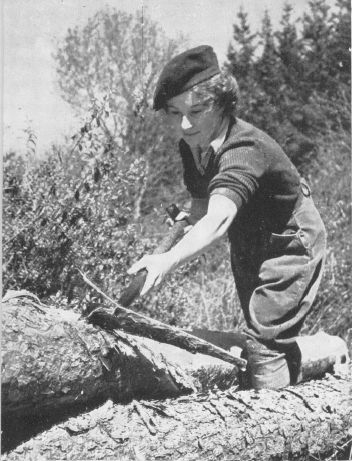
A member of the Women's Timber Corps in the Second World War

For most of British history, people cleared forest to make farmland. Changes in the Holocene climate changed the ranges of many species. This makes it complex to estimate the likely extent of natural forest cover. For example, in Scotland four main areas have been identified: oak dominated forest south of the Highland Line, Scots Pine in the Central Highlands, hazel/oak or pine/birch/oak assemblages in the north-east and south-west Highlands, and birch in the Outer Hebrides, Northern Isles and far north of the mainland. Furthermore, fire, human clearance, and grazing probably limited forest cover to about 50% of the land area of Scotland even at its peak. The stock of woodland declined sharply during the First World War and "a Forestry Subcommittee was added to the Reconstruction Committee to advise on policy when the war was over. The Subcommittee, better known as the Acland Committee after its chairman Sir A. H. D. Acland, came to the conclusion that, in order to secure the double purpose of being able to be independent from foreign supplies for three years and a reasonable insurance against a timber famine, the woods of Great Britain should be gradually increased from three million acres to four and three quarter millions at the end of the war". After the Acland Report of 1918, the Forestry Commission was formed in 1919 to meet this need. State forest parks were established in 1935.

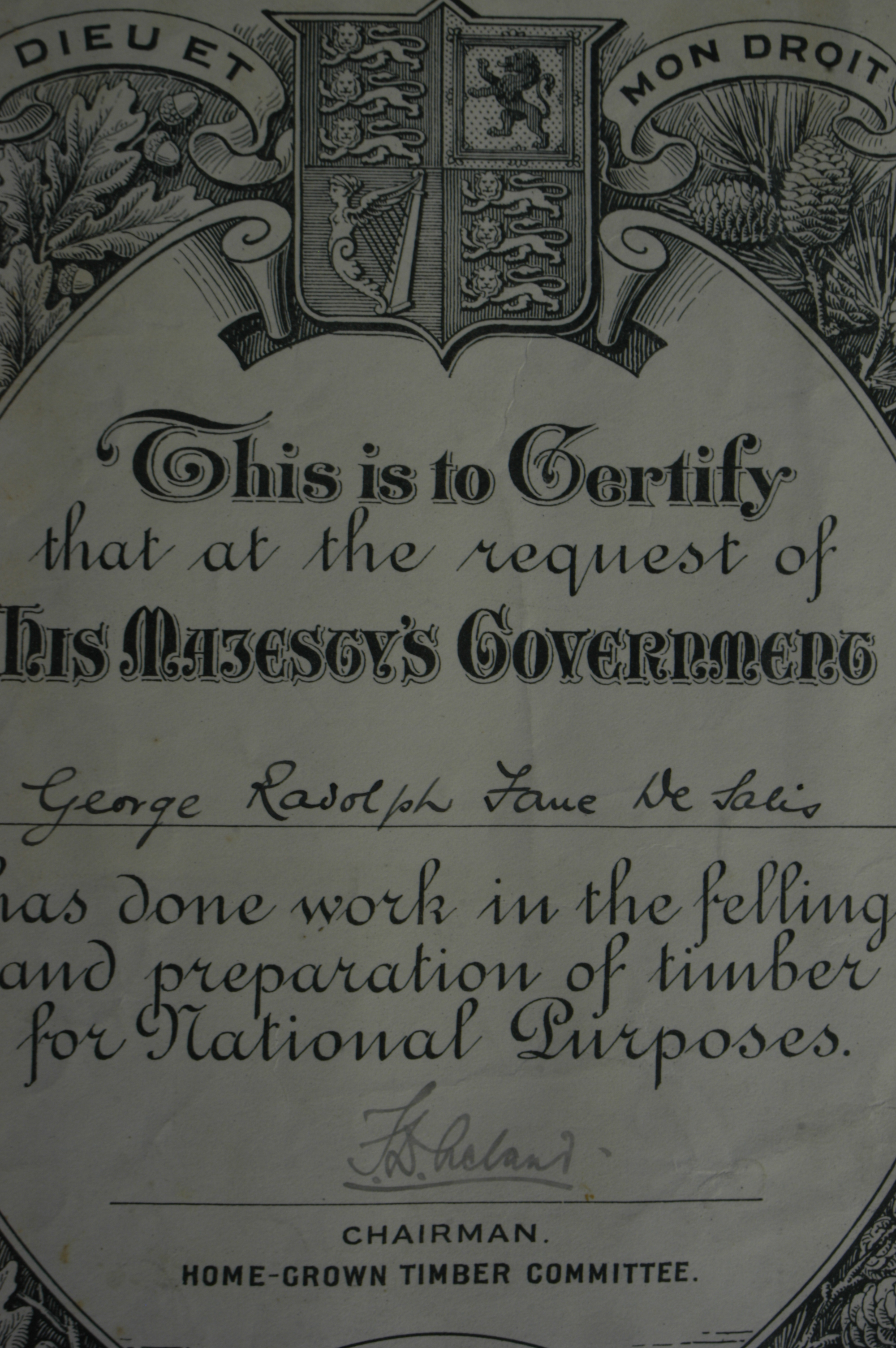
Detail of a certificate awarded by the Home-Grown Timber Committee, September 1916

Emergency felling controls had been brought in during the World Wars, and these were made permanent in the Forestry Act 1951. Landowners were also given financial incentives to devote land to forests under the Dedication Scheme, which in 1981 became the Forestry Grant Scheme. By the early 1970s, the annual rate of planting exceeded 40,000 hectares (99,000 acres) per annum. Most of this planting comprised fast-growing conifers. Later in the century the balance shifted, with fewer than 20,000 hectares (49,000 acres) per annum being planted during the 1990s, but broadleaf planting actually increased, exceeding 1,000 hectares (2,500 acres) per year in 1987. By the mid-1990s, more than half of new planting was broadleaf.

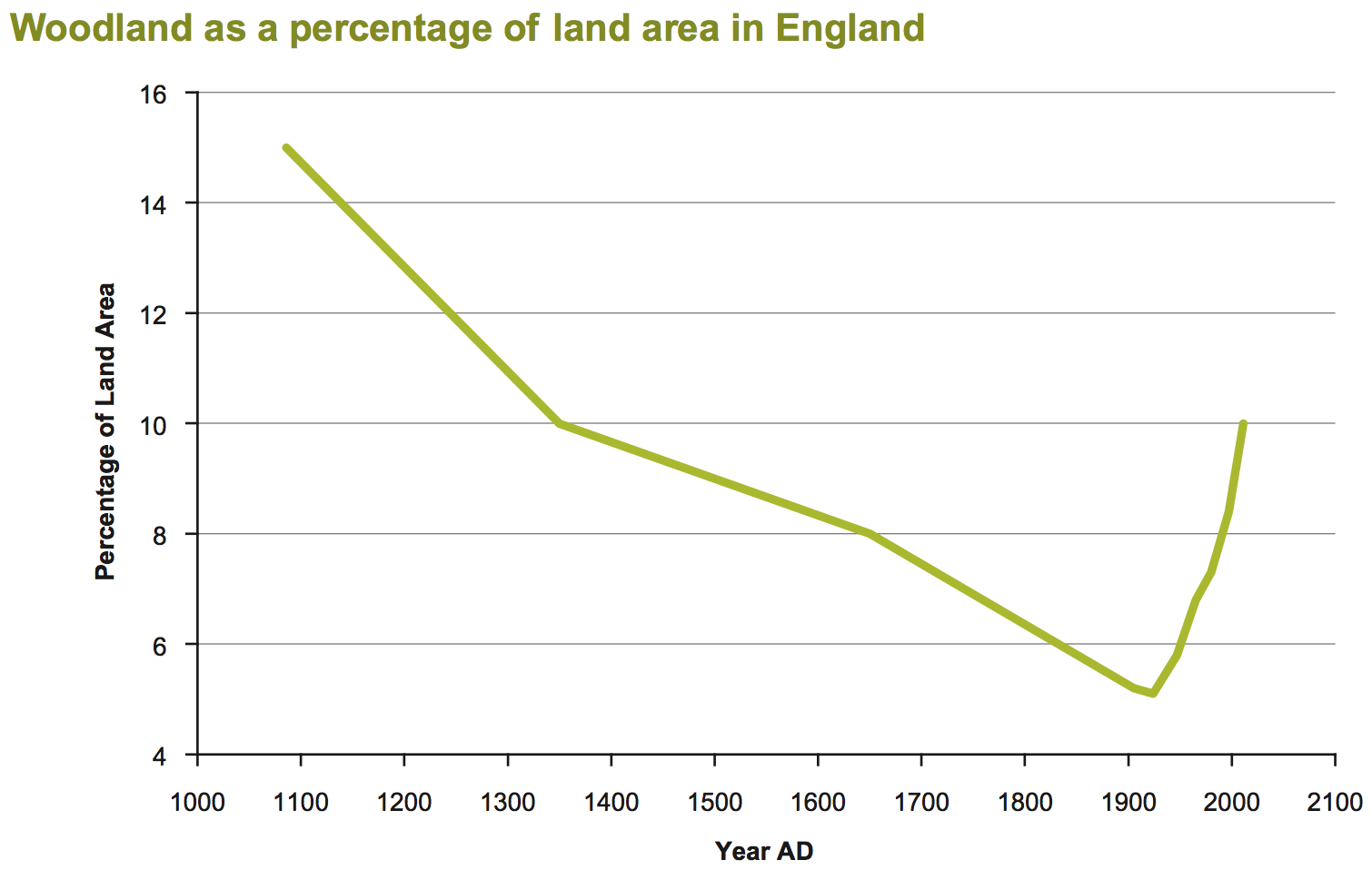
Historical woodland cover of England. The Domesday Book of 1086 indicated cover of 15%, "but significant loss of woodland started over four thousand years ago in prehistory". By the beginning of the 20th century this had dropped to 5%. The government believes 12% can be reached again by 2060.

In 1988, the Woodland Grant Scheme replaced the Forestry Grant Scheme, paying nearly twice as much for broadleaf woodland as conifers. (In England, the Woodland Grant Scheme was subsequently replaced by the English Woodland Grant Scheme, which operates six separate kinds of grant for forestry projects.) That year, the Farm Woodlands Scheme was also introduced, and replaced by the Farm Woodland Premium Scheme in 1992. Also in the 1990s, a programme of afforestation led to the establishment of Community Forests and the National Forest, which celebrated the planting of its seven millionth tree in 2006. As a result of these initiatives, the stock of forested land is increasing, though the rate of increase has slowed since the turn of the millennium.

Woodland creation is still an important role of the Forestry Commission. It still works closely with government to achieve afforestation, championing initiatives such as The Big Tree Plant and Woodland Carbon Code. Originally, the commission operated across Great Britain, but in 2013 Natural Resources Wales took over responsibility for Forestry in Wales, whilst two new bodies (Forestry and Land Scotland and Scottish Forestry) were established in Scotland on 1 April 2019.

In October 2010, the new coalition government of the UK suggested it might sell off around half the Forestry Commission-owned woodland in the UK. A wide variety of groups were vocal about their disapproval, and by February 2011, the government abandoned the idea. Instead, it set up the Independent Panel on Forestry led by Rt Rev James Jones, then the Bishop of Liverpool. This body published its report in July 2012. Among other suggestions, it recommended that the forested portion of England should rise to 15% of the country's land area by 2060.

== Ancient woodland ==
Ancient woodland is defined as any woodland that has been continuously forested since 1600. It is recorded on either the Register of Ancient Semi-Natural Woodland or the Register of Planted Woodland Sites. There is no woodland in Britain that has not been profoundly affected by human intervention. Apart from certain native pinewoods in Scotland, it is predominantly broadleaf. Such woodland is less productive, in terms of timber yield, but ecologically rich, typically containing a number of "indicator species" of indigenous wildlife. It comprises roughly 20% of the forested area.

== Native and historic tree species ==
Britain is relatively impoverished in terms of native species. For example, only thirty-one species of deciduous tree and shrub are native to Scotland, including ten willows, four whitebeams and three birch and cherry. (Note: This source includes the following shrubs and small trees that do not appear in Hart 1994 or Sterry Press 1995: Betula nana, Prunus spinosa, Rosa canina, Salix cinerea, Salix aurita, Salix lanata, Salix lapponum (Downy willow), Salix phylicifolia, Salix arbuscala (Mountain willow), Salix myrsinites (Whortle-leaved willow), Salix myrsinifolia, Salix reticulata, Sambucus nigra, Viburnum opulus. Smout et al. 2007 also lists the Arran Whitebeams: Sorbus rupicola (Rock Whitebeam), Sorbus pseudofennica and Sorbus arranensis although not the very rare and recently discovered Sorbus pseudomeinichii)

== Purpose ==
The Forestry Commission states its aims as:

- more trees, more diverse species, growing & thriving
- better managed woods and forests that are protected and improving
- bigger benefits for nature, climate, people and the economy

== Threats ==
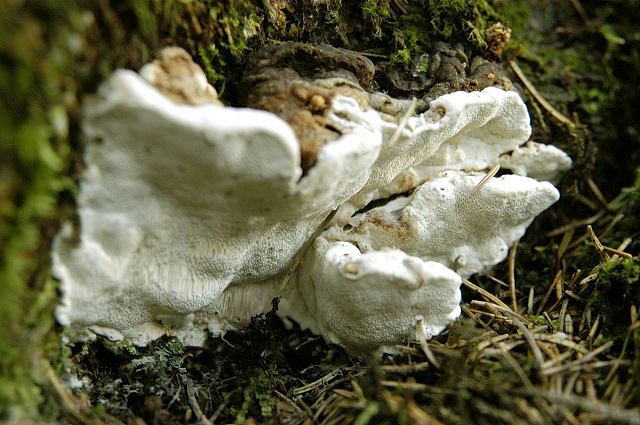
White Rot Fungus, Heterobasidion annosum

In 2021, a report by Woodland Trust assessed that only 7% of the UK's native woodlands are in good condition.

Most serious disease threats to British woodland involve fungus. For conifers, the greatest threat is white rot fungus (Heterobasidion annosum). Dutch elm disease arises from two related species of fungi in the genus Ophiostoma, spread by elm bark beetles. Another fungus, Nectria coccinea, causes Beech bark disease, as does Bulgaria polymorpha. Ash canker results from Nectria galligena or Pseudomonas savastanoi, and most trees are vulnerable to Honey Fungus (Armillaria mellea). The oomycete Phytophthora ramorum (responsible for "Sudden oak death" in the USA) has killed large numbers of Japanese Larch trees in the UK.

Acute oak decline has a bacterial cause. Beetles, moths and weevils can also damage trees, but the majority do not cause serious harm. Notable exceptions include the Large Pine Weevil (Hylobius abietis), which can kill young conifers, the Spruce Bark Beetle (Ips typographus) which can kill spruces, and the Cockchafer (Melolontha melolontha) which eats young tree roots and can kill in a dry season. Rabbits, squirrels, voles, field mice, deer, and farm animals can pose a significant threat to trees. Air pollution, climate change, acid rain, and wildfire represent the main environmental hazards. In 2021, winter storms destroyed about 12,000 hectares of forest in Britain.

In November 2023, a study conducted by 42 researchers, with 1,200 experts consulted, warned that UK forests are heading for "catastrophic ecosystem collapse" within the next 50 years due to multiple threats including disease, extreme weather and wildfires. The study suggested action plans to save the forests including increasing the diversity of tree species, planting trees of different ages, promoting natural regeneration, managing deer populations and more.

== Timber industry ==
In 2022, the UK produced 3,145,000 cubic metres of sawn wood, 3,466,000 cubic metres of wood-based panels and 3,462,000 tonnes of paper and paperboard. The UK does not produce enough timber to satisfy domestic demand, and the country imports 80% of its timber and paper from abroad, as the world's second largest timber importer after China. Most sawn softwood imports come from the Baltic, in particular Sweden (42%), Latvia (16%) and Finland (14%). Most of the domestically produced construction timber is spruce graded to the strength class C16.

=== Nations ===
Forestry is a devolved matter in the UK, administered by separate agencies in each nation. They are: in England, the Forestry Commission; in Scotland, Scottish Forestry; in Wales, Natural Resources Wales; and in Northern Ireland, the Department of Agriculture, Environment and Rural Affairs (DAERA). Each of these agencies is tasked with delivering the UK Forestry Standard.

=== Planting ===
Successful forestry requires healthy and well-grown trees that are resistant to diseases and parasites. The wood of highest quality has a straight, circular stem without a spiral grain or fluting, and small, evenly spaced branches. The chances of achieving these conditions are maximised by planting good-quality seed in the best possible growing environment.

Tree breeding programmes, to ensure the best seed, are hampered by the trees' long life-cycles. However, particularly since the 1950s, the Forestry Commission among other organisations has been running a programme of breeding, propagation, induced flowering and controlled pollination with the aim of producing healthy, disease-resistant, fast-growing stock.

=== Transportation ===
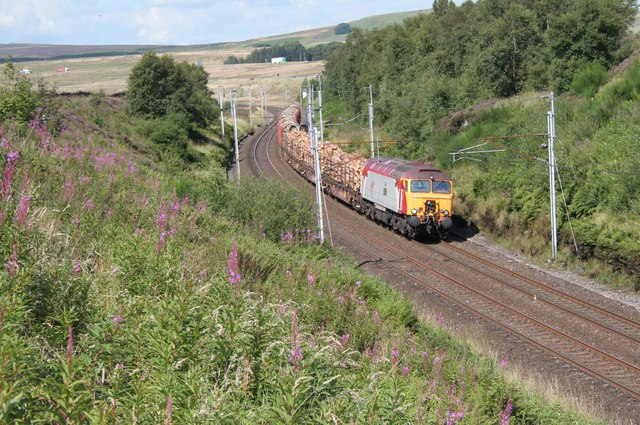
A timber train at Greenholme, near Kendal, 2007

Nearly all Britain's timber uses road haulage. As forests are located in rural areas, the heavy timber vehicles have severely damaged many single lane tracks, especially in the Highlands. To combat this, companies are being forced to provide funding for repairs, as well as using alternative transport systems such as rail and coastal shipping. Following the loss of forest railways in the Beeching cuts of the 1960s, rail's share of timber transport has risen since 2002 with the opening of new lines in Devon, the Pennines, Scotland and South Wales by Colas Rail.

== Land values ==
The price of woodland has risen out of proportion to its timber yield, and in 2022 reached £28,000 per hectare (£11,000 per acre). Woodland prices are affected by its favourable tax treatment and its high amenity value.

== See also ==
- List of forests in the United Kingdom
- List of Great British Trees
- List of renewable resources produced and traded by the United Kingdom
- English Lowlands beech forests
- Woodland Carbon Code
- Natural Forest Standard
- Forestry in Scotland
