= Forestry in Wales =

Overview of the forestry sector and forests in Wales

Forestry in Wales is the practice of planting, managing, and caring for forests in Wales.

== History ==
The development of afforestation and the production and supply of timber in Wales come under Natural Resources Wales, as set out in the Forestry Act 1967 (c. 10).

In 2013 Natural Resources Wales took over responsibility for Forestry in Wales,

In 2020, the Welsh Government launched a long-term re-forestation plan known as the National Forest for Wales (Welsh: Coedwig Genedlaethol i Gymru).

== Management ==
Natural Resources Wales is a Welsh Government sponsored body, for the management of all the natural resources of Wales. It was formed from a merger of the Countryside Council for Wales, Environment Agency Wales, and the Forestry Commission Wales, and also assumes some other roles formerly taken by Welsh Government. Other organisations working in Wales to improve the management of Welsh woodlands and forests include the Confederation of Forest Industries, Coed Cymru and Woodknowledge Wales.

== See also ==
- Category:Forests and woodlands of Wales
- Celtic broadleaf forests
- Celtic rainforest
- Celtic rainforests in Wales
