= Glen Nant =

Woodland and nature reserve in Argyll and Bute, Scotland

Glen Nant National Nature Reserve
- IUCN category IV (habitat/species management area)
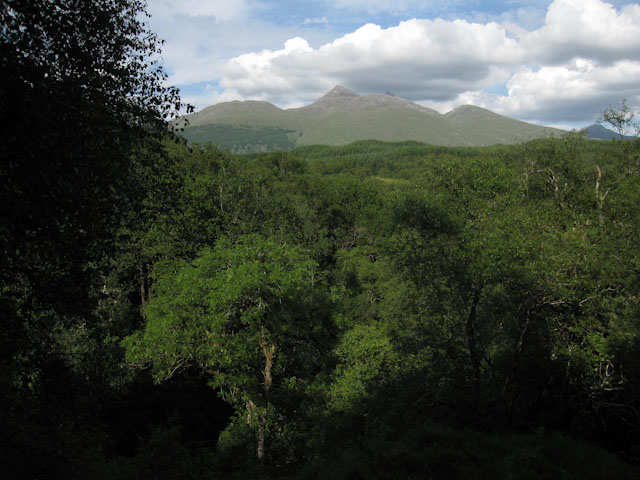
- View over Glen Nant Looking towards Ben Cruachan

- Location within Argyll and Bute
- Location: Argyll and Bute, Scotland
- Coordinates: 56.405888°N 5.230946°W
- Area: 338.5 ha (836 acres)
- Designation: NatureScot
- Established: 1979
- Owner: Forestry and Land Scotland (FLS)
- Website: Glen Nant National Nature Reserve

Glen Nant (Scottish Gaelic: Gleann Neannta) is a glen lying to the south of Taynuilt in the Argyll and Bute council area of Scotland. An area of woodland of 339 hectares on the western side of the River Nant is designated as national nature reserve (NNR), which is owned and managed by Forestry and Land Scotland (FLS). It is an example of an Atlantic Oakwood, and is one of largest areas of upland oak woodland in north Argyll.

The woodland at Glen Nant was coppiced during the 18th and 19th centuries to maximise production of bark for the tanning industry and charcoal for iron smelting, with charcoal being supplied to the iron furnace at Bonawe. Oak was the favoured species for both purposes, leading to a dominance of oak trees in the area. Other tree species remained mostly in areas that were difficult to manage, such as along the river. During the 1970s the Forestry Commission (predecessor body of FLS) planted areas with commercial conifer species such as Sitka spruce. By the later 1970s the focus on increasing the amount of commercial forestry led to oak woodland on the eastern side of the lower glen being felled in preparation for conifer plantations: following negotiations between the Nature Conservancy Council (predecessor body of NatureScot) and the Forestry Commission the area was declared a national nature reserve (NNR) in 1979. Deer fences were erected to encourage natural regeneration of the forest. Work has since been undertaken to remove non-native conifer species and reinstate the coppicing of some areas of trees. In 2003 the NNR was extended to include the FCS woodland on the western side of the lower glen.

== Flora and fauna ==
Glen Nant contains examples of several different types of woodland. Ash and hazel woodland is present on areas of lime-rich soil, with bedrock to oak and birch present on more acidic soils. Other tree species include wych elm, gean, holly, alder and sallows. The wide range of different woodland types leads to a diverse range of other plants, with ferns and heath growing on acidic soils and herb species in the lime-rich areas. At least 234 species of lichen have been recorded here, mostly being those that require humid and oceanic conditions.

Wood ants are one of the most obvious of the insect species living in Glen Nant, however the woods also support less common species such as the nationally rare cranefly Tipula luridorostris. There are an estimated 175 species of butterflies and moths, and two nationally scarce species of fly. Mammals species found at Glen Nant include red squirrels and otters.

== Visitors ==
Two short waymarked trails have been built to allow visitors to walk around the forest. The 400 m Riverbank Trail leads from the car park to picnic area by the River Nant, whilst the Ant Trail is a 3.3 km circular route through the oakwoods. The charity Plantlife have produced a short leaflet that highlights some of the flora that can be seen on a 1.6 km section of the Ant Trail. National Cycle Route 78 (the Caledonia Way) passes the entrance to the reserve, here following a section of the B845.

== Conservation designations ==
As well as being a national nature reserve, Glen Nant is also a Site of Special Scientific Interest, and forms part of the Loch Etive Woods Special Area of Conservation. The NNR is designated a Category IV protected area by the International Union for Conservation of Nature.
