= Dunwich Forest =

Suffolk Wildlife Trust nature reserve

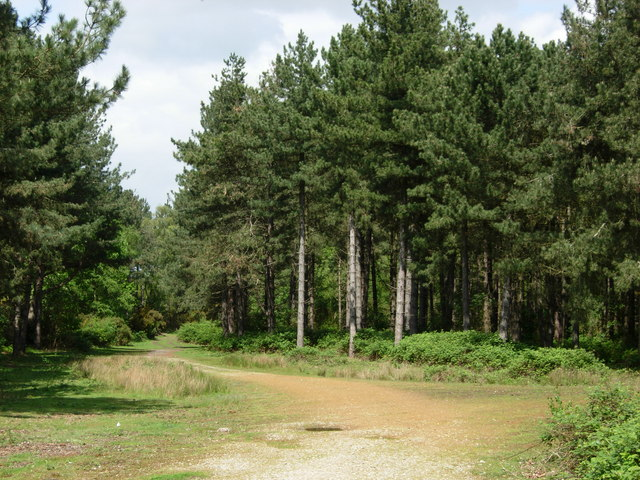
- Dunwich Forest

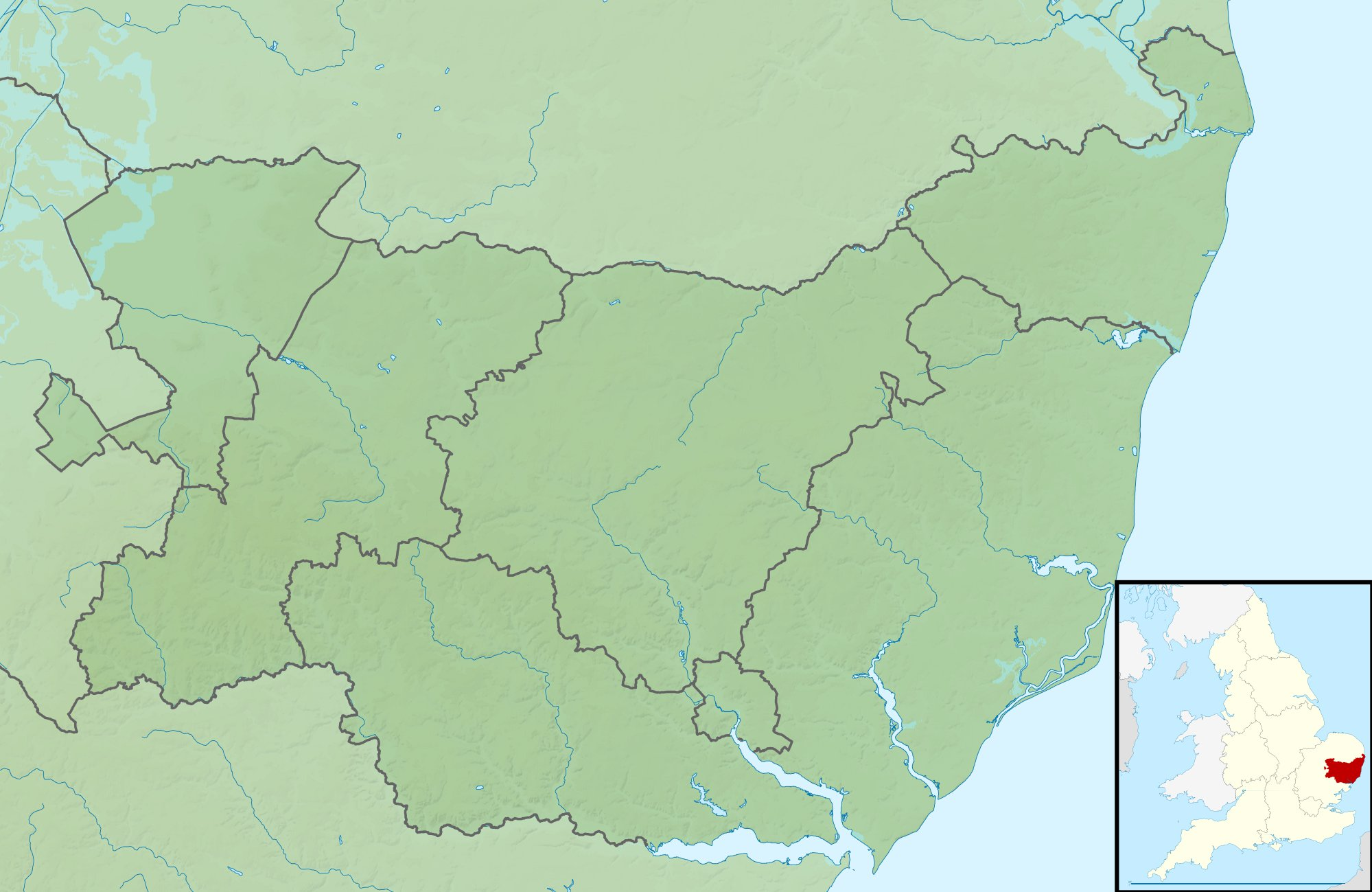
- Location within Suffolk
- Location: Dunwich, Suffolk, England
- Nearest city: Dunwich
- Coordinates: 52.290°N 1.617°E
- Area: 9 km^{2} (3.5 sq mi)
- Established: 1920s (afforestation)
- Operator: Forestry England

Dunwich Forest is an area of forest and lowland heath around 1 mile (1.6 km) north-west of the village of Dunwich in the English county of Suffolk. The forest covers an area of approximately 9 square kilometres (900 ha; 3.5 sq mi) and was originally planted by the Forestry Commission. The forest is within the Suffolk Coast and Heaths Area of Outstanding Natural Beauty and is in the area known as the Suffolk Sandlings. South of the reserve is the National Trust property of Dunwich Heath, one of the largest remaining areas of lowland heath on the Suffolk coast, and the RSPB reserve at Minsmere. To the north and east of the forest are Dingle Marshes, part of the Suffolk Coast National Nature Reserve.

The Forestry Commission (now Forestry England) purchased land from the Dunwich and Westleton estates during the 1920s. Following the acquisition of this land, they began an afforestation programme to develop a conifer plantation, which became Dunwich Forest. The forest is now a mix of broadleaved and coniferous woodland with some areas of more open heath.

In 2006 Forestry England began work on a rewilding programme at Dunwich. Working with the Suffolk Wildlife Trust and the Royal Society for the Protection of Birds, they plan to gradually replace conifers in the northern area of the forest with broad-leaved trees and to convert areas in the south of the forest to lowland heath, one of the rarest British habitats. Suffolk Wildlife Trust has introduced Dartmoor ponies to the northern area which it manages as a reserve 270 hectares (670 acres) in size.
