= Hepburne-Scott =

Hepburne-Scott is a surname. Notable people with the name include:

- James Hepburne-Scott (1947-2025), British forester and land agent
- Hugh Hepburne-Scott, 6th Lord Polwarth (1758–1841), Member of the Parliament of the United Kingdom, peer in the House of Lords
- Henry Hepburne-Scott, 7th Lord Polwarth (1800–1867), Member of the Parliament of the United Kingdom, peer in the House of Lords, Lord Lieutenant and Sheriff Principal of Selkirkshire, and Lord-in-Waiting to Queen Victoria
- Walter Hepburne-Scott, 8th Lord Polwarth (1838–1920), Scottish peer in the House of Lords and Lord Lieutenant of Selkirkshire
- Walter George Hepburne-Scott, 9th Lord Polwarth (1864–1944), Scottish peer, Lord Lieutenant, and public servant
- Henry Hepburne-Scott, 10th Lord Polwarth (1916–2005), Scottish chartered accountant, businessman and Conservative politician chartered accountant, businessman and politician
- Andrew Walter Hepburne-Scott, 11th Lord Polwarth
