= Forestry England =

United Kingdom government agency for forestry

Agency overview
- Formed: 1996
- Type: Executive agency
- Jurisdiction: England
- Headquarters: 620 Bristol Business Park, Coldharbour Lane, Bristol, BS16 1EJ
- Agency executive: Mike Seddon, Chief Executive
- Parent agency: Forestry Commission
- Website: www.forestryengland.uk

Forestry England is a division of the Forestry Commission, responsible for managing and promoting publicly owned forests in England.

Forest Enterprise, the precursor to Forestry England, was originally formed as a Great Britain-wide organization in 1996. With the advent of devolution to Scotland and Wales, Forest Enterprise was on 1 April 2003 split into Forest Enterprise England, Forest Enterprise Scotland, and Forest Enterprise Wales. Forest Enterprise England was subsequently rebranded to Forestry England on 1 April 2019.

Its mission is to connect everyone with the nation’s forests by creating and caring for England's forests for people to enjoy, wildlife to flourish and businesses to grow. It operates under the Forestry Act(s) and subsequent legislation and is part of the Civil Service and an Executive Agency of the Forestry Commission.

== Operation ==
Forestry England is headquartered in Bristol, and for organisational purposes it divides England into six forest regions each with their own regional office:

- North England, based in Bellingham, Northumberland near Hexham.
- Yorkshire, based in Pickering, North Yorkshire.
- Central England, based in Mansfield, Nottinghamshire.
- West England, based in Coleford, Gloucestershire.
- East England, based in Santon Downham, Suffolk.
- South England, based in Lyndhurst, Hampshire.

It also manages Westonbirt Arboretum in Gloucestershire, perhaps the most important and widely known arboretum in the United Kingdom. and Bedgebury National Pinetum, a living collection of conifers, in Kent, which is said to be the largest collection of conifers in the world.

== England's forests ==
List of forests managed by the Forestry Commission

Forestry England manages 1,500 woodland and forest areas covering around 250,000 hectares (620,000 acres) making them England’s largest land manager. Around half of England’s softwood production arises from the estate and supports hundreds of small businesses and several large sawmills that rely on a guaranteed supply of timber to attract capital investment. Over 230 million people visit the public forest estate each year which supports over 70 substantial business partners on the estate, delivering most of the Forest Centre services, bike hire and other outdoor activities. Alongside all the economic and recreational activity, some 45% of the estate contributes to England’s most precious National Park landscapes and Areas of Outstanding Natural Beauty. Additionally, 68,000 hectares (170,000 acres) are designated Sites of Special Scientific Interest in recognition of their value for nature, virtually all of which is in sound or recovering ecological condition and accessible to the public.

== See also ==
- List of ancient woods in England
- Forestry in the United Kingdom
