= National Forest for Wales =

Forestation project

Coordinates: 53.212°N 4.158°W

- Coedwig Genedlaethol i Gymru (Welsh)

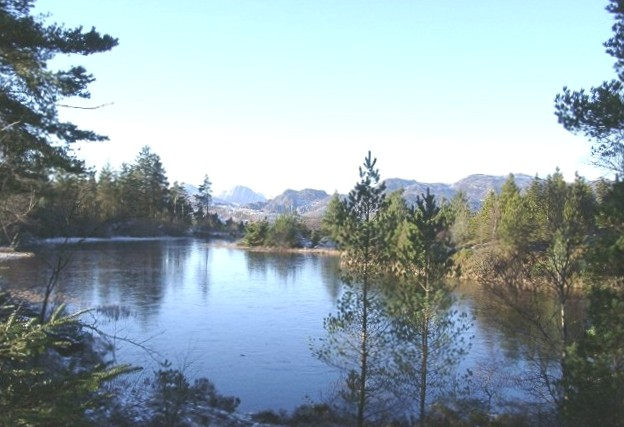
- Gwydir Forest, a site of the National Forest for Wales
- Type of project: Forestation
- Country: Wales
- Ministry: Welsh Government
- Launched: 12 April 2020; 5 years ago
- Status: In progress
- Website: gov.wales/national-forest-wales

The National Forest for Wales at Bwlch Nant yr Arian

The National Forest for Wales with Tilhill Forestry

The National Forest for Wales (Welsh: Coedwig Genedlaethol i Gymru) is a long-term forestation programme by the Welsh Government, aiming to form a network of woodland throughout Wales.

== Background ==
Currently only around 15% of Wales is woodlands covering 306,000 hectares (3,060 km^{2}), with forestation (new woodland plantings) efforts in Wales reaching their lowest level since the 1970s, with annual woodland creation not exceeding 2,000 hectares (20 km^{2}) since 1975. In 2020, only 290 hectares (2.9 km^{2}) of woodland was planted.

Advantages of a wide-spread forestation programme allows for the increase in tree coverage, which acts as a carbon sink helping to address climate change. The new or expanded forests can also support biodiversity, and as a habitat for endangered flora and fauna, such as red squirrels and the spreading bellflower.

Woodlands may have a tourism potential, however to accommodate tourism, woodlands would require infrastructure to accommodate visitors, which may impact the conservation efforts of the woodlands.

More woodlands may support an increasing domestic forestry industry, in particular increasing the production and use of timber in the construction industry as a low-carbon alternative to steel and concrete. In 2017, 80% of Wales' timber was imported, with the UK being the second-biggest net importer of forest products in the world.

== History ==
The programme was announced on 12 March 2020. By 4 November 2020, the first fourteen sites of the programme were announced. The sites are part of the Welsh Government estate, and are maintained and managed by Natural Resources Wales.

On 14 July 2021, the Welsh Government opened the application process for "The Woodland Investment Grant" (TWIG), providing financial help to those creating new woodlands in Wales or making improvements to existing woodlands up to the standards set for the programme. These include landowners and those otherwise holding full management control of public or private land. The first round of applications closed on 27 August 2021. The first application window had a budget of £2.5 million and an additional budget for revenue of £250,000, with each grant being awarded between £10,000 and £250,000, and costs claimed by 31 March 2022. The grant received more than 350 expressions of interest from people who want to plant new woodlands in Wales. Another period open to applications was launched in November 2020.

The grant has desirable outcomes for the new woodlands. The grant wants applicants to produce connected, dynamic, multi-purpose woodlands and trees, that demonstrate learning research and innovation. Claimants fulfilling these outcomes are more likely to be recommended by the government.

The programme is in collaboration with the National Museum, National Library and Royal Commission on the Ancient and Historical Monuments of Wales to create a "National Forest People's Collection for Wales".

== Aims ==
There are various aims of the programme:

- Creating a network of woodlands across the entire length and breadth of Wales, being accessible to everyone
- Be a community venture, with forestation projects being conducted by communities, farmers and landowners across Wales
- Create new woodlands and restore, expand and maintain Wales' existing woodlands
- Help to protect nature and address the issue of biodiversity loss
- Support the health and wellbeing of communities
- In the distant future, the ability of humans and animals to be able to walk across Wales without leaving woodlands

== Woodland sites ==
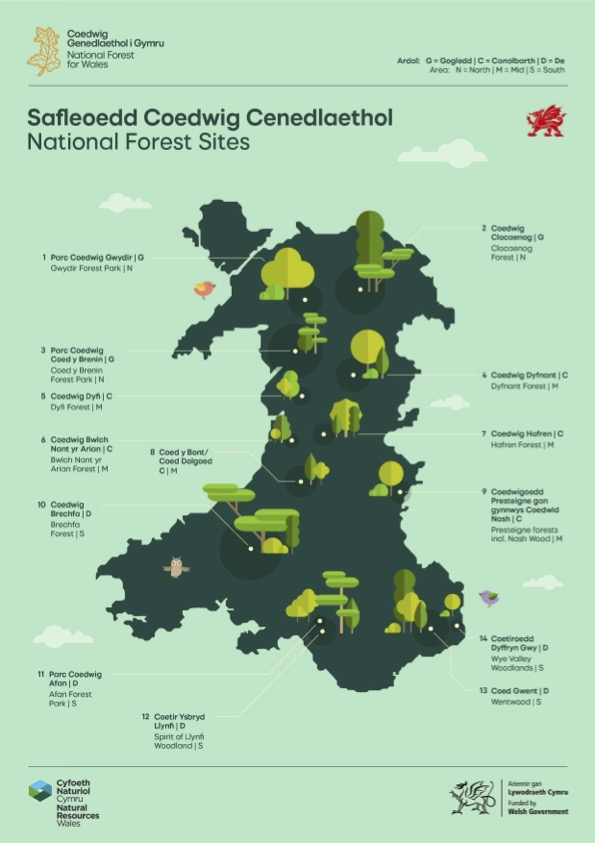
National Forest sites

There are currently fourteen sites in the programme across ten principal areas of Wales designated on 4 November 2020:

- Gwydir Forest Park (Conwy)
- Clocaenog Forest (Conwy and Denbighshire)
- Coed y Brenin Forest Park (Gwynedd)
- Dyfnant Forest (Powys)
- Dyfi Forest (Gwynedd and Powys)
- Bwlch Nant yr Arian Forest (Ceredigion)
- Hafren Forest (Powys)
- Coed y Bont/Coed Dolgoed (Ceredigion)
- Presteigne Forest including Nash Wood (Powys and into England)
- Brechfa Forest (Carmarthenshire)
- Afan Forest Park (Bridgend and Neath Port Talbot)
- Spirits of Llynfi Woodland (Bridgend)
- Wentwood (Monmouthshire and Newport)
- Wye Valley Woodlands (Monmouthshire)
