= Mabie, Dumfries and Galloway =

Mountain biking routes in Dumfries and Galloway, Scotland

Coordinates: 55.024332°N 3.643255°W

Mabie is a collection of mountain biking routes located in Dumfries and Galloway, southwest Scotland. The mountain bike routes are part of the 7Stanes project by Forestry and Land Scotland throughout the Scottish Borders and Dumfries and Galloway.

The area has two loops for less experienced riders; the green graded 'Big Views' trail and the blue graded 'Woodhead' route.

The 'Phoenix' trail is for the more experienced rider. The 17 km (11 mi) long red graded route consists of technical sections, fast flowing sections and jumps built on singletrack through mixed woodland. There is also a black trail named the Kona Darkside. at 3.8 km (2.4 mi) it is mainly in the style of 'North Shore' with raised wooden trails over outcrops of granite.
