= Plant Health Act 1967 =

Act of the Parliament of the United Kingdom

Plant Health Act 1967 (Note: Section 9(1).)
- Act of Parliament
- Parliament of the United Kingdom
- Long title: An Act to consolidate the Destructive Insects and Pests Acts 1877 to 1927, together with section 11 of the Agriculture (Miscellaneous Provisions) Act 1949.
- Citation: 1967 c. 8
- Territorial extent: England and Wales; Scotland; (Note: Section 9(2).)

Dates
- Royal assent: 22 March 1967
- Commencement: 22 March 1967 (Note: The Acts of Parliament (Commencement) Act 1793.)

Other legislation
- Amends: See § Repealed enactments
- Repeals/revokes: See § Repealed enactments
- Amended by: European Communities At 1972; Local Government Act 1972; Local Government (Scotland) Act 1973; Local Government Act 1974; Customs and Excise Management Act 1979; Criminal Justice Act 1982; Agriculture Act 1986; Channel Tunnel (Amendment of Agriculture, Fisheries and Food Import Legislation) Order 1990; Statute Law (Repeals) Act 1993; Local Government (Wales) Act 1994; Local Government etc. (Scotland) Act 1994; Criminal Justice Act 2003; Natural Resources Body for Wales (Functions) Order 2013; Forestry and Land Management (Scotland) Act 2018; Plant Health (Amendment etc.) (EU Exit) Regulations 2020

Status: Amended

Text of statute as originally enacted

Revised text of statute as amended

Text of the Plant Health Act 1967 as in force today (including any amendments) within the United Kingdom, from legislation.gov.uk.

The Plant Health Act 1967 (c. 8) is an act of the Parliament of the United Kingdom that consolidated enactments related to the control of destructive insects and pests in Great Britain.

== Provisions ==
=== Repealed enactments ===
Section 7 of the act repealed 7 enactments, listed in the schedule to the act.

| Citation | Short title | Extent of repeal |
|---|---|---|
| 40 & 41 Vict. c. 68 | Destructive Insects Act 1877 | The whole act. |
| 52 & 53 Vict. c. 30 | Board of Agriculture Act 1889 | In section 2(1), paragraph (a). |
| 52 & 53 Vict. c. 30 | Board of Agriculture Act 1889 | In section 9(1), the words " the Privy Council or ", the word " other" and the words " Privy Council or ". |
| 52 & 53 Vict. c. 30 | Board of Agriculture Act 1889 | Schedule 1, Part I. |
| 7 Edw. 7. c. 4 | Destructive Insects and Pests Act 1907 | The whole act. |
| 1 & 2 Geo. 5. c. 49 | Small Landholders (Scotland) Act 1911 | In Schedule 1, the reference to the Destructive Insects and Pests Acts 1877 and 1907. |
| 9 & 10 Geo. 5. c. 58 | Forestry Act 1919 | Section 3(2), so far as it transfers the power of making orders under the Destructive Insects and Pests Acts 1877 to 1927. |
| 17 & 18 Geo. 5. c. 32 | Destructive Insects and Pests Act 1927 | The whole act. |
| 12 & 13 Geo. 6. c. 37 | Agriculture (Miscellaneous Provisions) Act 1949 | Section 11. |

== Subsequent developments ==
The act has been amended on several occasions. Section 5(3) was amended by the Local Government (Wales) Act 1994 and substituted in Scotland by the Local Government etc. (Scotland) Act 1994. The Forestry and Land Management (Scotland) Act 2018 substituted section 1(2)(a)–(b), inserted section 1(2)(za), and repealed section 6(4), modifying the competent authorities for Scotland.
