= James Hepburne-Scott =

British forester (1947–2025)

James Patrick Hepburne-Scott (21 July 1947 – 3 August 2025) was a prominent British forester and land agent, widely recognized as a key figure in developing the UK's woodland and peatland carbon markets.

== Career ==
He co-founded the company Forest Carbon and was honored with an OBE in 2023 for his services to forestry and the environment. He is regarded as the "instigator" of the UK's carbon markets for woodland and peatland, leading the establishment of the Woodland Carbon Code and the Peatland Code. Through his work with Forest Carbon, he oversaw the planting of over 13 million trees across the UK and Ireland. He held numerous leadership positions in the forestry sector, including serving as President of the Royal Scottish Forestry Society (RSFS) from 2016 to 2019 and as an honorary fellow of the Institute of Chartered Foresters.

== Personal life ==
Born on 21 July 1947, James Hepburne Scott was the eldest of three children. He was educated at Eton College and the Royal Military Academy Sandhurst. He died at home on 3 August 2025, at the age of 78, after being diagnosed with a glioblastoma. He is remembered for his empathy, enthusiasm, and significant contributions to sustainable land management and conservation in the UK.
