= Scottish Forestry =

Scottish Forestry Coilltearachd n h-Alba

Agency overview
- Formed: 1 April 2019
- Preceding agency: Forestry Commission Scotland
- Type: Executive Agency of the Scottish Government
- Jurisdiction: Scotland
- Headquarters: Silvan House, Edinburgh
- Minister responsible: Mairi Gougeon MSP, Cabinet Secretary for Rural Affairs, Land Reform and Islands
- Agency executive: Paul Lowe, Chief Executive
- Website: Official website

Scottish Forestry (Scottish Gaelic: Coilltearachd na h-Alba) is the public body responsible for forestry regulation, policy and support to private landowners in Scotland. It was formed on 1 April 2019, to take over some of the responsibilities of Forestry Commission Scotland, which was dissolved. Scottish Forestry exists alongside Forestry and Land Scotland, also established on 1 April 2019, which is responsible for managing and promoting the National Forest Estate.

In addition to regulatory functions in Scotland, Scottish Forestry is also responsible for management of the UK Forestry Standard and the Woodland Carbon Code and for provision of economic advice on forestry: it undertakes these activities on behalf of Scotland, England and Wales under cross-border arrangements with the Forestry Commission (England) and Natural Resources Wales. Under these arrangements Wales will co-ordinate the commissioning, co-ordination and programme management of forestry research, with Forest Research remaining a separate executive agency of the Forestry Commissioners, whilst the residual Forestry Commission (now covering only England for most purposes) will continue to be responsible on behalf of the whole of the UK for co-ordinating international forestry policy support and certain plant health functions in respect of trees and forestry.

Scottish Forestry is an executive agency of the Scottish Government, and is headquartered in Edinburgh. It forms part of the Scottish Government's Environment and Forestry Directorate, and reports to the Cabinet Secretary for Rural Affairs and Islands. The Chief Executive of Scottish Forestry is Paul Lowe, formerly Registrar-General for Scotland. Previous chief executives were Dr David Signorini, who took over from Jo O'Hara in December 2019.

== Forest conservancies ==
For organisational purposes Scottish Forestry divides Scotland into five districts, termed "conservancies":

- Highland and Islands Conservancy, covering most of Highland and the island groups of Orkney, Shetland and the Outer Hebrides
- Grampian Conservancy, covering Aberdeen, Aberdeenshire and Moray
- Perth and Argyll Conservancy, covering Angus, Perth and Kinross, northern Stirling and most of Argyll and Bute
- Central Scotland Conservancy, covering the Central Belt, including southern Fife, Lanarkshire, northern Ayrshire and the Isle of Arran
- South Scotland Conservancy, covering Dumfries and Galloway, the Scottish Borders and southern Ayrshire

== Chief Forester for Scotland ==
Scottish Forestry is responsible for the appointment of the Chief Forester for Scotland, who is responsible for professional standards amongst forestry staff in both Scottish Forestry and Forestry and Land Scotland. The role of Chief Forester for Scotland is to:

- Be a trusted source of technical and professional expertise and advice for Scottish Ministers’ on forestry matters.
- Act as the ‘Head of Profession’ for forestry staff in Scottish Forestry and Forestry and Land Scotland (and the wider public sector) with a responsibility for promoting and maintaining professional standards.
- Work with professional bodies and the wider sector to promote and grow the profession of forestry in Scotland.

Helen McKay was appointed Chief Forester for Scotland in August 2020.

== See also ==
- Forestry in Scotland
