= Dyfnant Forest =

Forest in Powys, Wales

Coordinates: 52°42′59″N 3°29′14″W

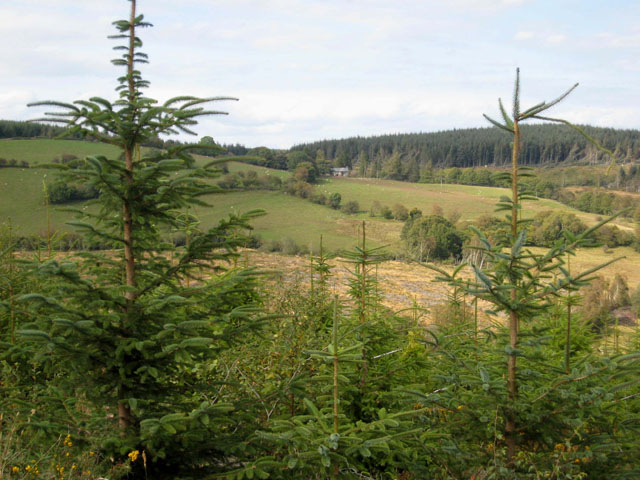
View across farmland to Dyfnant Forest

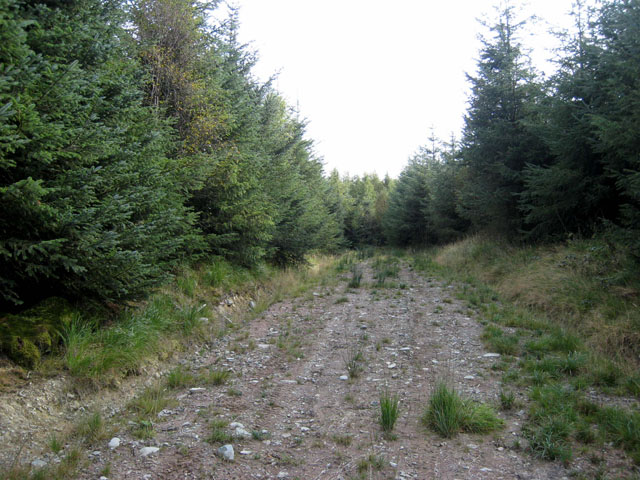
Forest track in Dyfnant Forest

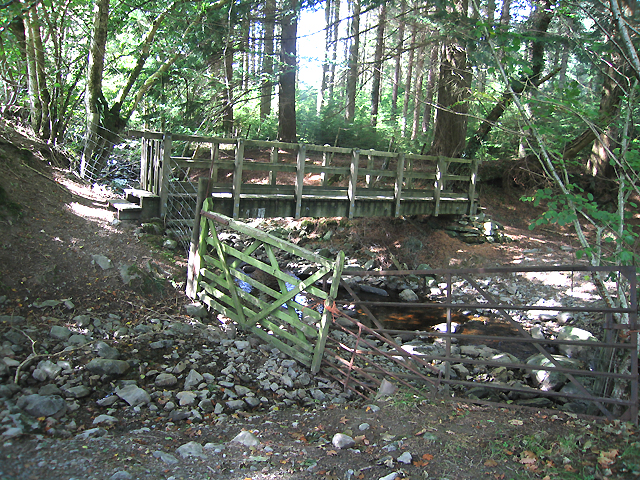
Footbridge in Dyfnant Forest

Dyfnant Forest is a remote forest in northeastern-central Powys, Wales.

== Location ==
Dyfnant Forest lies to the west of the B4395 road, a road which stems north from the A458 road and is between the valleys of the Afon Twrch to the west and the Afon Efyrnwy to the east, north of the village of Llangadfan. It is described by Lonely Planet as being "where a well-signposted maze of forestry tracks culminates in one enormous hill before descending rather spectacularly toward Lake Vyrnwy" (five miles away). Dyfnant Forest has an area of 2,430 hectares (6,000 acres) located at the periphery of the Cambrian Mountains, just south of Lake Vyrnwy.

== Geography ==
The original forest was planted by the Forestry Commission. It is approached from a country road from Llangadfan, which branches into a 2.5 kilometres (1.6 mi) foot track. It is well served by 64 kilometres (40 mi) of forest tracks. The forest tracks include the Rainbow Trails, which were established by a partnership between Forestry Commission Wales and the Dyfnant and Fyrnwy Horse Riders' & Carriage Drivers' Association; set in peaceful forest environment the trails consist of five horse-riding trails.

== Wildlife ==
The forest is a large working forest, of predominately coniferous trees with pockets of native deciduous trees. The forest has rich growth of mixed plantation comprising conifers such as cypress, western red cedar, lodgepole pine, Douglas fir, Norway spruce and grand fir, as well as from deciduous trees.

Within the forest, Dyfnant Meadows spread over a small area of 9.5 hectares (23 acres), which is mainly an open land. This grassland continues to be used as a hill pasture for sheep and cattle. Apart from the grassland, the flora includes oxeye daisy and eye-bright, and in bog areas lady's smock, lousewort, rush and meadowsweet; wet areas have sedge and rush; wooded areas comprise sessile oak, moss, lichen and fern.

Notable bird species in the forest include goshawk, crossbills and black grouse in particular. The goshawk has appeared increasingly since the 1980s.

== Other developments ==
A wind farm to produce 80–120 megawatts of power has been proposed in the Dyfnant Forest.

Severn Trent Water Company has the responsibility of managing the forest, interacting with the Countryside Council for Wales and the Royal Society for the Protection of Birds, and the task of preserving these forests along with the Vyrnwy estate, as a national nature reserve.

A particular 1 kilometre (0.62 mi) stretch of the trail in the forest is identified (by the Forestry Commission for Welsh Assembly Government) as an encouraging place (for children visiting the area to identify 10 species) to look for wildlife species such as squirrel, frog, stoat and owl amidst rich foliage of several tree species.

It was used as a special stage during the 2013 Wales Rally GB.
