= List of Forestry Commission land on the Isle of Wight =

This is a list of the land owned or managed by the Forestry Commission on the Isle of Wight, England, United Kingdom. In Great Britain the Forestry Commission are the government department responsible for the protection and expansion of Britain's forests and woodlands. As of 2007, there are 8 areas of woodland on the Isle of Wight being managed by the Forestry Commission, 5 are owned by them and 3 are leased from other owners.

Over the last few years the Forestry Commission has undertaken a detailed survey of the woodlands it manages on the Isle of Wight, as part of what it calls the "Isle of Wight Forest Design Plan". Each woodland has its own comprehensive design plan that sets out how the FC proposes to manage the area over the next 30 years. These include very detailed maps and pie charts showing the current range of tree species found in each area, how this will be changed over the coming years, aerial photographs and plans on how access will be improved for visitors.

The data in the table is taken from the design plans for each woodland, available at their website.

== Forests and Woodlands ==
Site name	Ownership		Area^{[A]}		Grid reference^{[B]}	Car park	Map^{[C]}
Site name	Owned	Leased	Hectares	Acres	Grid reference^{[B]}	Car park	Map^{[C]}
Brighstone Forest		check	482	1191.0	SZ419849	check	1
Parkhurst Forest	check		395	976.1	SZ474906	check	2
Combley Great Wood	check		130	321.2	SZ545895	☒	3
Firestone Copse	check		98	242.2	SZ558910	check	4
Burnt Wood		check	47	116.1	SZ445923	☒	5
Kemphill Moor Copse	check		20	49.4	SZ568898	☒	6
Woodhouse Copse	check		18	44.5	SZ527928	☒	7
Bouldnor Copse		check	?	?	SZ382902	☒	8

== Notes ==
^{A} Data rounded to one decimal place.
^{B} Grid reference is based on the British national grid reference system, also known as OSGB36, and is the system used by the Ordnance Survey.
^{C} Link to Ordnance Survey 1:50000 scale maps as they show the boundaries of the land (in purple). Service provided by Streetmap.
