= Executive agencies of the Scottish Government =

Scottish Government

Executive agencies are established by ministers as part of Scottish Government to carry out a discrete area of work. They form an integral part of the Scottish Government, but have a specific, well-defined remit. They are staffed by civil servants and headed by a Chief Executive, who is a civil servant, and are directly accountable to the government.

Executive agencies differ from public bodies, which are not considered to be part of the Government, although they are listed in the Scottish Government's directory of national public bodies alongside the public bodies. Executive agencies may be considered similar to the government's core directorates, but are generally more focused on the management and direct delivery of public services as opposed to policy formation (although they may also provide strategic policy input).

Executive agencies were first established following Sir Robin Ibbs' (then head of the Efficiency Unit) "Next Steps" Report in 1988. The intention was that they would take responsibility for, and bring a new, more customer-focused approach to, individual executive (service delivery) functions within government. This would leave their parent departments to concentrate on policy development, although this boundary can be very blurred.

== Current agencies ==
The following bodies are executive agencies:

- Accountant in Bankruptcy
- Disclosure Scotland
- Education Scotland
- Forestry and Land Scotland
- National Social Work Agency
- Scottish Forestry
- Scottish Prison Service
- Scottish Public Pensions Agency
- Social Security Scotland
- Student Awards Agency for Scotland
- Transport Scotland

== Selected former agencies ==
- Communities Scotland (part reabsorbed into Scottish Government, the remainder reorganised into the Scottish Housing Regulator)
- Fisheries Research Services (now part of Marine Scotland, within core Scottish Government)
- Mental Health Tribunal for Scotland
- Registers of Scotland (now a non-ministerial office of the Scottish Government )
- Scottish Agricultural Science Agency (now part of core Scottish Government)
- Scottish Fisheries Protection Agency (now part of Marine Scotland, within core Scottish Government)
- Scottish Court Service (now an NDPB under Judiciary and Courts (Scotland) Act 2008)
- Scottish Building Standards Agency (now part of core Scottish Government)
- Scottish Housing Regulator (now a non-ministerial office of the Scottish Government )
- Social Work Inspection Agency (now part of the Care Inspectorate, a non-ministerial department of the Scottish Government)
- Her Majesty's Inspectorate of Education (now part of Education Scotland)
