= Confederation of Forest Industries =

UK trade association

- Abbreviation: ConFor
- Formation: 2004
- Legal status: Non-profit company
- Purpose: Trade association for forestry in the UK
- Location: 59 George St, Edinburgh, EH2 2JG
- Region served: UK
- Members: Forestry and wood-using businesses
- Chief Executive: Stuart Goodall
- Main organ: Board of Directors
- Website: ConFor

The Confederation of Forest Industries, shortened to ConFor, is the trade association for the forestry industry in the United Kingdom.

It was established to represent forestry and wood-using businesses, from nurseries and growers, to wood processing end-users. It was created to represent the views of the industry to the Forestry Commission and the policy makers within the relevant legislatures and executives.

== Structure ==
It has the largest membership of any representative body within the UK sector and is headquartered in Edinburgh.

=== Regions ===
- Scotland - Madderty
- Wales - Caernarfon
- North England - Belford, Northumberland
- East England - Weldon, Northamptonshire
- Home Counties - Sandhurst
- Marches - Newton Abbot
- South West England - Kingsbridge
- England - Newton Abbot

== History ==
ConFor was created in 2004 and is the first organisation of its kind that has the entire supply chain within its membership, from nurseries and woodland owners, to processors and sawmills. This makes it different from other nations as the trade associations of the forest and wood-using industries are split within the different competing constituents of the supply chain. It is a membership organisation that is funded by and accountable to businesses within the industry.

== Policy ==
The organisation lobbies governments, parliaments and assemblies of the United Kingdom, Scotland, Wales, Northern Ireland on behalf of members. As a member of the Confederation of European Forest Owners it also lobbies for its members at the European Parliament. Since devolution, rural policy making has been passed to the devolved administrations of the UK, meaning that strategy can vary over the different parts of the country. The devolved administrations of Scotland and Wales have produced their own forestry strategies: The Scottish Forestry Strategy and Woodlands for Wales which both view forestry as an integral part in the efforts to tackle climate change. In Scotland and Wales forestry policy resides within the Forestry Commission where, as, in England forestry policy resides in the Department for Environment, Food and Rural Affairs (Defra) with the Forestry Commission England implementing policy.

== Context ==
Forestry in the UK is split between the Forestry Commission, which is a government agency and the private sector. It breaks down between the private and public sector as:

	Conifer FC	Conifer Private	Broadleaf FC	Broadleaf Private	Total Woodland
England	147,000 ha	215,000 ha	55,000 ha	706,000 ha	1127,000 ha
Scotland	424,000 ha	621,000 ha	28,000 ha	269,000 ha	1342,000 ha
Wales	92,000 ha	64,000 ha	14,000 ha	114,000 ha	285,000 ha
Northern Ireland	56,000 ha	10,000 ha	5,000 ha	16,000 ha	87,000 ha
