= Helen McKay (plant physiologist) =

British scientist

Helen M. McKay OBE is Head of the Centre, Sustainable Forestry and Climate Change at Forest Research. In July 2020 she was appointed to the role of Chief Forester for Scotland by Scottish Forestry.

== Research and career ==
McKay joined Forest Research as a plant physiologist in 1988 where she worked to improve the physiological quality of planting stock. In 2000 she was made specialist advisor for forest operations and the physical environment. Today she serves as Head of the Centre, Sustainable Forestry and Climate Change. In 2016 McKay established the Forest Research Culture Working Group to improve forestry research culture.

McKay is a Fellow of the Institute of Chartered Foresters and serves as one of the editors of the journal Forestry: An International Journal of Forest Research. She serves as a trustee of the Scottish Forestry Trust. She was appointed Officer of the Order of the British Empire (OBE) in the 2020 New Year Honours for services to forest science and forestry.

=== Selected publications ===
Her publications include:

- Nicoll, Bruce C.; Redfern, Derek B.; McKay, Helen M. (1996). "Autumn frost damage: clonal variation in Sitka spruce". Forest Ecology and Management. 80 (1–3): 107–112. doi:10.1016/0378-1127(95)03635-0.
- McKay, Helen M.; Jinks, Richard L.; McEvoy, Colin (1999). "The effect of desiccation and rough-handling on the survival and early growth of ash, beech, birch and oak seedlings". Annals of Forest Science. 56 (5): 391–402. doi:10.1051/forest:19990504. ISSN 0003-4312.
