= Forestry Commission =

UK non-ministerial government department responsible for forests

Agency overview
- Formed: 1919
- Type: Non-ministerial government department
- Jurisdiction: England (1919–present); Scotland (1919–2019); Wales (1919–2013)
- Employees: 3,240
- Annual budget: £50.8 million (2009–2010)
- Agency executive: Barbara Young, Baroness Young of Old Scone, chair
- Parent department: Department for Environment, Food and Rural Affairs
- Child agencies: Forestry England; Forest Research
- Website: gov.uk/government/organisations/forestry-commission

- Applies to: England
- Relates to: Forestry

Other UK counterparts
- Northern Ireland: Department of Agriculture, Environment and Rural Affairs
- Scotland: Forestry and Land Scotland; Scottish Forestry
- Wales: Natural Resources Wales

The Forestry Commission is a non-ministerial government department responsible for the management of publicly owned forests and the regulation of both public and private forestry in England.

The Forestry Commission was previously also responsible for forestry in Wales and Scotland. However, on 1 April 2013, Forestry Commission Wales merged with other agencies to become Natural Resources Wales, whilst two new bodies (Forestry and Land Scotland and Scottish Forestry) were established in Scotland on 1 April 2019.

The Forestry Commission was established in 1919 to expand Britain's forests and woodland, which had been severely depleted during the First World War. the commission bought large amounts of agricultural land on behalf of the state, eventually becoming the largest manager of land in Britain. Today, the Forestry Commission is divided into three divisions: Forestry England, Forestry Commission and Forest Research. Over time the purpose of the commission broadened to include many other activities beyond timber production. One major activity is scientific research, some of which is carried out in research forests across Britain. Recreation is also important, with several outdoor activities being actively promoted. Protecting and improving biodiversity across England's forests are also part of the Forestry Commission's remit.

the commission received criticism for its reliance on conifers, particularly the uniform appearance of conifer forests and concerns over a lack of biodiversity. Furious protests from the general public and conservation groups accompanied attempts to privatise the organisation in 1993 and 2010. In the reporting year 2024-2025 it planted 10.4 million trees.

== Role ==
Before the setting up of separate bodies for Scotland the Forestry Commission managed almost 700,000 hectares (about 1.7 million acres) of land in England and Scotland, making it the country's biggest land manager. The majority of the land (70%) was in Scotland, 30% of the landholding is in England. Activities carried out on the forest estate include maintenance and improvement of the natural environment and the provision of recreation, timber harvesting to supply domestic industry, regenerating brownfield and replanting of harvested areas.

Deforestation was the main reason for the creation of the commission in 1919. Britain had only 5% of its original forest cover left and the government at that time wanted to create a strategic resource of timber. Since then forest coverage has doubled and the commission's remit expanded to include greater focus on sustainable forest management and maximising public benefits. Woodland creation continues to be an important role of the commission, however, and works closely with government to achieve its goal of 12% forest coverage by 2060, championing initiatives such as The Big Tree Plant and Woodland Carbon Code.

The Forestry Commission is also the government body responsible for the regulation of private forestry in England; felling is generally illegal without first obtaining a licence from the commission. the commission is also responsible for encouraging new private forest growth and development. Part of this role is carried out by providing grants in support of private forests and woodlands.

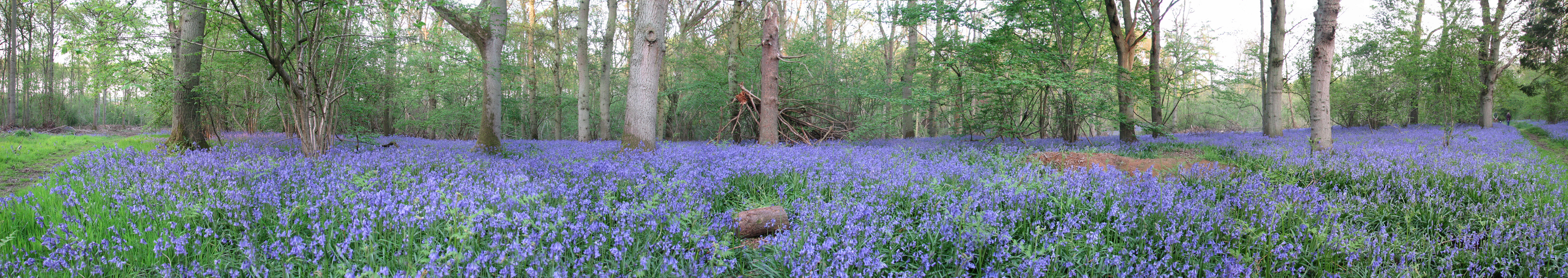
Bluebells in the north-east of Bucknell Wood, part of Whittlewood Forest in Northamptonshire

== History ==
Forestry Act 1919 (Note: Section 11(1).)
- Act of Parliament
- Parliament of the United Kingdom
- Long title: An Act for establishing a Forestry Commission for the United Kingdom, and promoting afforestation and the production and supply of timber therein, and for purposes in connexion therewith.
- Citation: 9 & 10 Geo. 5. c. 58
- Territorial extent: United Kingdom

Dates
- Royal assent: 19 August 1919
- Commencement: 1 September 1919 (Note: Section 11(2).)
- Repealed: Northern Ireland: England and Wales and Scotland: 22 March 1967
Other legislation
Amended by	Forestry Act 1921; Forestry (Transfer of Woods) Act 1923; Forestry Act 1945; Plant Health Act 1967
Repealed by	Northern Ireland: Forestry Act (Northern Ireland) 1953; England and Wales and Scotland: Plant Health Act 1967 and Forestry Act 1967

Status: Repealed

Text of statute as originally enacted

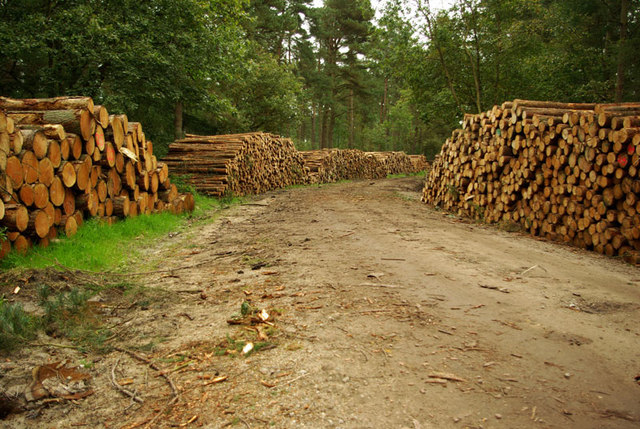
The Forestry Commission produces timber from state-owned forests

=== Establishment to 1950s ===
The Forestry Commission was established as part of the Forestry Act 1919 (9 & 10 Geo. 5. c. 58). The board was initially made up of eight forestry commissioners and was chaired by Simon Fraser, 14th Lord Lovat from 1919 to 1927. the commission was set up to increase the amount of woodland in Britain by buying land for afforestation and reforestation. the commission was also tasked with promoting forestry and the production of timber for trade. The royal forests were transferred to the commission by the Forestry (Transfer of Woods) Order 1924 (Statutory Instrument 1924/386). During the 1920s the commission focused on acquiring land to begin planting out new forests; much of the land had previously been used for agricultural purposes. During the Great Depression the Forestry Commission's estate continued to grow, so that it was just over 360,000 hectares of land by 1934. The low cost of land, and the need to increase timber production, meant that by 1939 the Forestry Commission was the largest landowner in Britain.

At the outbreak of the Second World War the Forestry Commission was split into the Forest Management Department, to continue with the commission's duties, and the Timber Supply Department to produce enough timber for the war effort. This division lasted until 1941, when the Timber Supply Department was absorbed by the Ministry of Supply. Much of the timber supplied for the war came from the New Forest and the Forest of Dean. The war also saw the commission introduce a licensing system for tree felling. By the end of the war, about one-third of the available timber had been cut down and used.

The advisory committee on Forest Research was formed in 1929 to guide the research efforts of the Forestry Commission. After the war, the commission began to increase its research output significantly. This included the establishment of three research stations, beginning with Alice Holt Lodge in 1946. The expansion in research accompanied a significant increase in timber sales, exceeding £2 million per year during the 1950s.

=== 1960s to 1990s ===
The Countryside Act 1968 required public bodies, including the Forestry Commission, to "have regard to the desirability of conserving the natural beauty and amenity of the countryside". This forced the commission to focus on conservation and recreation, as well as on the production and sale of timber. The conservation effort was partly driven by Peter Garthwaite and Sylvia Crowe. Crowe also helped the Forestry Commission landscape their forests to make them more suitable for recreational use.

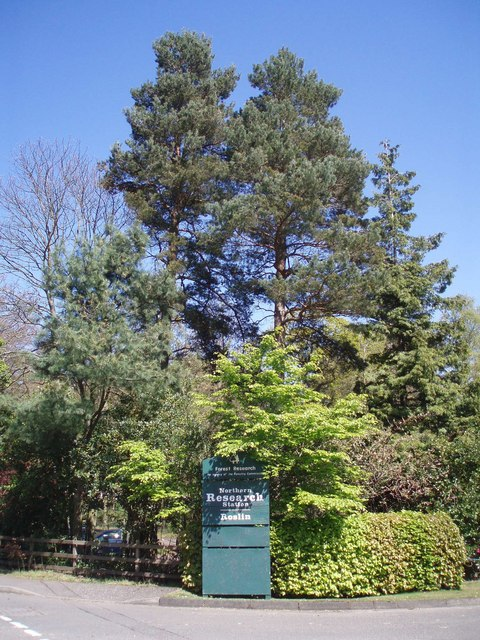
The entrance to Northern Research station

Having begun to develop campsites within their forests during the early 1960s, the commission set up a Forest Cabins Branch during the 1970s to expand the number of cabins available for the public to stay in during their holidays. In 1970, the commission opened its Northern Research Station in Roslin, Scotland. The 1970s also saw the publication of a Treasury report which stated that "afforestation ... and replanting fell far short of achieving the official 10% return on investment", with concerns over the long-term profitability of timber production. This was coupled with a major outbreak of Dutch elm disease throughout the decade.

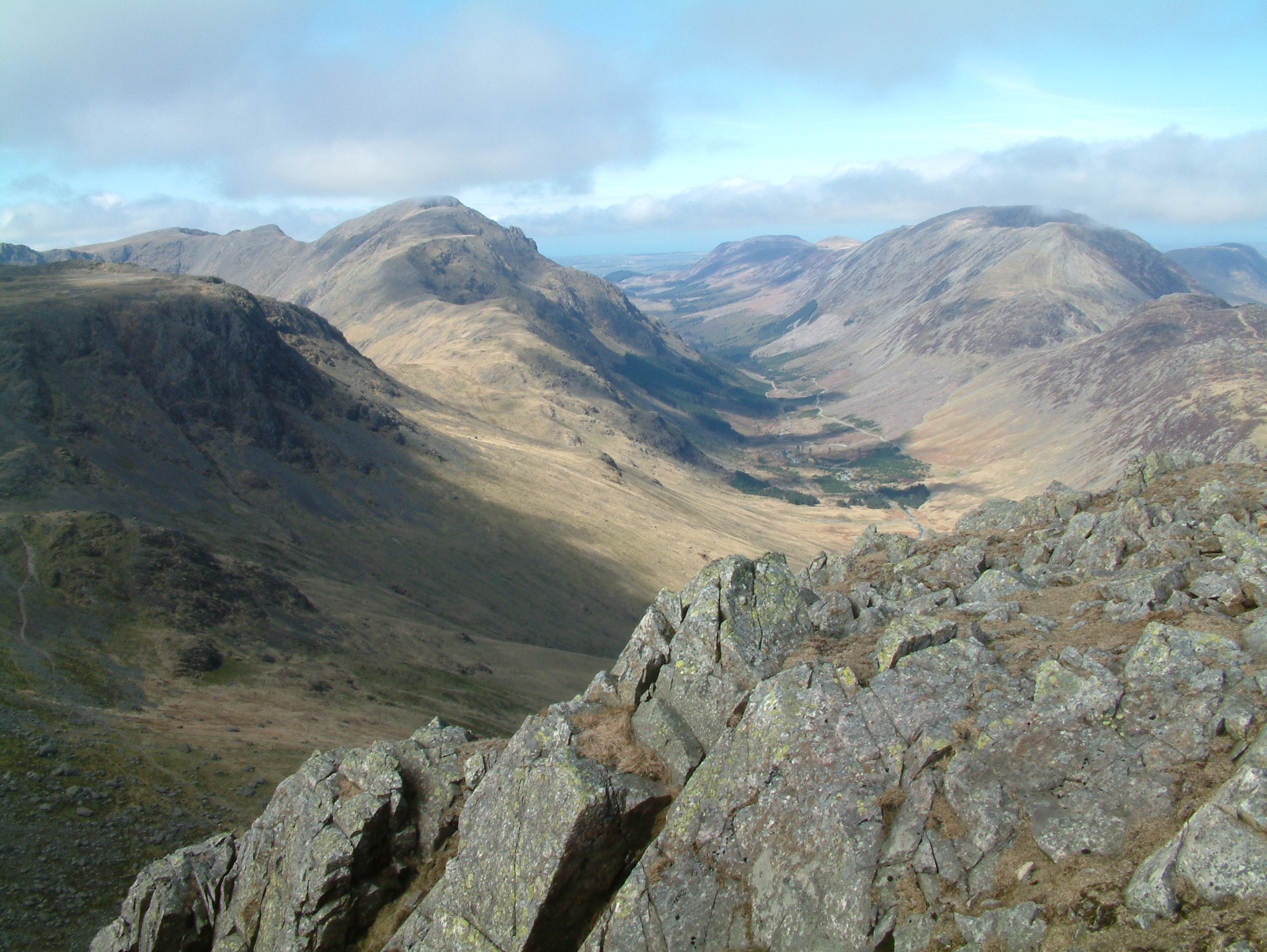
There are extensive valley forests in Cumbria; this is Ennerdale.

The early 1980s recession forced the Forestry Commission to expand its sales beyond Britain: exports quickly reached 500,000 tonnes of timber per year. The Forestry Act 1981 (c.39) allowed the sale of Commission land that was used for forestry. By 1986 there were calls for the full privatisation of the Forestry Commission and its estate. Meanwhile, the Wildlife and Countryside (Amendment) Act 1985 (c.31) had imposed a duty on the Forestry Commissioners to endeavour to achieve a "reasonable balance" between the interests of timber production and of conservation. The Great Storm of 1987 caused significant damage to forests under the control of the commission, though most of the downed trees were recovered and eventually sold.

The early 1990s saw the Department of Forestry absorb the Forest Authority from the commission, which had previously acted as a separate government department. The management of the forest estate became the responsibility of Forest Enterprise, making up a major part of the reduced Forestry Commission. In 1993 it was again suggested that the Forestry Commission could be privatised, sparking protest from many conservation groups. After the Forestry Review Group produced their report in 1994, it was announced by the government that "Forestry Commission woodlands will remain in the public sector".

The decline in timber sales since the mid-1990s forced the commission to focus on research and recreation more than ever before, something that was encouraged by the government. As a result the Forestry Commission began to expand woodland around urban areas for the first time.

=== 2000s onwards ===
Devolution meant the Forestry Commission had to report to the Scottish Parliament and Welsh Assembly as well as the national government. This was achieved by splitting responsibility for forests by national borders, resulting in the creation of Forestry Commission England, Scotland and Wales as sub-departments of the Forestry Commission of Great Britain. On 1 April 2013 Forestry Commission Wales was merged into Natural Resources Wales: between that date and April 2019 the Forestry Commission was responsible only for English and Scottish forests.

In October 2010, the government introduced the Public Bodies Bill to the House of Lords, which would have enabled the Secretary of State to sell or lease public forests in England. According to The Guardian, "the news [was] met with near-universal disgust and shock". The same newspaper also quoted Caroline Lucas MP, leader of the Green Party of England and Wales, as saying it was an "unforgivable act of environmental vandalism". An online petition opposing the sale received more than 500,000 signatories. In February 2011, after a sustained campaign of protest by groups such as the Ramblers, Save Our Woods and Hands off our Forest, the government announced it had abandoned its current plans and would remove the forestry clauses from the Public Bodies Bill. An 'independent panel' was also established to advise on the future direction of forestry and woodland policy in England, and on the role of the Forestry Commission. The panel's interim report in late 2011 suggested that the government had ignored the benefits of publicly owned forests.

Due to austerity policies enacted in the UK from 2010 the Forestry Commission, like many government bodies, suffered a considerable cut in its budget to meet its running costs, despite buoyant timber production, recreation usage and revenue. There have been considerable jobs losses in some sections, starting with 450 job losses in 2011. Employee salaries were effectively frozen in 2011, with progression pay being removed, and the bottom of pay scales becoming the standard rate for the job. This has created a wide variation in salaries for employees doing the same job and has reduced wage competitiveness, compared to some forestry employers. However, other government departments in Scotland and Northern Ireland have continued to honour progression pay. This has created some retention and recruitment problems, particularly for professions such as forestry management and IT.

Forestry Commission Wales (Welsh: Comisiwn Coedwigaeth Cymru) was separated from Forestry Commission on 1 April 2013, and merged with Environment Agency Wales and Countryside Council for Wales to create Natural Resources Wales, a single body delivering the environmental priorities of the Welsh Government. This move was controversial among forestry officials, with worries that the industry's voice will not be adequately heard in the new organisation. Two new bodies (Forestry and Land Scotland and Scottish Forestry) were established in Scotland on 1 April 2019 to take over the commission's responsibilities in Scotland.

=== The Forestry Commission's social concern ===
Integral to the Acland Report of 1916, which led to the setting up of the Forestry Commission immediately after the war, was the wider social concern. Large areas of upland Britain, it pointed out, were 'waste' and depopulated, and trees would not only increase their productiveness but 'demanded a higher rural population' than sheep rearing. They envisaged that 'the small holdings will be grouped together on the best land within or near the forests so as to economise labour in the working of the holdings, ... and to provide an ample supply of ... labour for [forestry] work. Families settled on new holdings in forest areas will be a net addition to the resident rural population'.

This remained the philosophy of the commission for nearly fifty years. In 1946 the incoming Director General wrote of the employment created and the help of the commission towards a solution of 'one of the baffling social problems of our time... to draw men and their families "back to the land" and to make the attraction permanent', especially through the smallholdings policy.

Lord Lovat, the 'Father' of the Forestry Commission, had extensive land holdings in Scotland, and it was in the Highlands that he and other Scottish landowners such as Sir John Stirling-Maxwell conceived of the scheme of land-settlement allied to forestry. As first chairman of the commission he was able to put into practice all over Britain this 'long cherished dream' of repopulating hill country, thanks to his good contacts in government. Money for the scheme was provided first by Philip Snowden, Chancellor in the first Labour government, and then by his successor in Baldwin's Conservative administration, Winston Churchill.

The scheme accordingly went ahead and created smallholdings in the new forests, of approximately ten acres, let for £15 a year. Originally 150 days' work was provided in the forests, but "in practice, of course, these smallholdings attracted the cream of our men whom we were glad to employ on full time..." Existing and often derelict agricultural dwellings were adapted and new ones built to a small number of basic designs. The scheme "was never a directly economic proposition, but in the pre-war days when motor traffic was lacking and it was much more important than today to have a solid caucus of skilled woodmen [sic] living in the forests, the indirect benefits were inestimable. The holdings were a great success, and filled a genuine need in the countryside..."

The number of smallholdings built slowed down after the Great Depression, was revived by the Special Areas programme of 1934 onwards, but then was virtually ended by the Second World War. The total number of smallholdings was 1,511. After 1945 policy shifted to the building of houses without holdings. This was more economic for the commission, and numbers of these peaked in 1955, with 2,688 cottages built by then. The smallholdings policy had been 'adequate during the early years of State forest development, when only a small nucleus of men was needed to plant and tend each forest. But expanding programmes of afforestation, new methods of fire protection, and above all the greatly increased volume of utilisation work that results as soon as the young woods reach the thinning stage, have made it essential, in most of the larger forests, to concentrate the building of new houses in villages or small community groups.' With houses designed for head foresters, the peak year for all forest tenancies was 1958, with the commission owning a total of 4,627 properties.

Many of the more ambitious forest villages were never completed, partly because of their isolation, partly through financial restrictions, and partly because mechanisation, transport improvements, and more use of contract labour, all meant there was less need for staff houses. The social desirability of "company villages" in remote locations was questioned.

Some houses had been sold on the open market by 1972, when government policy encouraged the disposal of 'surplus' land and buildings. The gradual sale of housing to incomers became a flood in 1978-9 (under Labour), and the Thatcher administration then encouraged surviving tenants to buy with generous discounts.

Although the social policy of the Forestry Commission is a thing of the past, its social impact on upland areas remains large, with many hamlets and small villages in what would otherwise be deserted or near-deserted valleys.

== Organisational structure ==
The Forestry Commission is governed by a Board of Commissioners made up of a chairperson and up to ten forestry commissioners. The current chairman is Baroness Young of Old Scone. The chief executive, Richard Stanford, is also one of these commissioners. Forestry commissioners are appointed by the King. An executive board works with the commissioners to handle the strategic management of the Forestry Commission.

The Forestry Commission is organised into Forest Services, Forestry England and Forest Research.

=== Devolution ===
In 2003, forestry policy and the management of state forests was devolved to each of the three national Administrations in Great Britain, and separate bodies have since been established for Wales (Natural Resources Wales in 2013) and Scotland (Scottish Forestry and Forestry and Land Scotland in 2019). The Forestry Commission continues to report to the Westminster Parliament via Defra ministers. However the devolved organisations continue to collaborate on a number of cross-border arrangements: Scottish Forestry is responsible for management of the UK Forestry Standard and the Woodland Carbon Code and for provision of economic advice on forestry, Natural Resources Wales originally co-ordinated the commissioning of research into forestry but this role has now passed to Scottish Forestry, and the Forestry Commission continues to be responsible on behalf of the whole of the UK for coordinating international forestry policy support and certain plant health functions in respect of trees and forestry. Forest Research, a separate executive agency of the Forestry Commissioners, also continues to provide research and evidence capabilities across the UK.

=== Forest Research ===
Forest Research is the research agency of the Forestry Commission that undertakes scientific research and surveys. Its core roles are to provide the evidence base for British forestry policies and to identify methods for sustainable forestry management. It also carries out research with, or on behalf of, academic and commercial organisations.

There are three forest research stations run by Forest Research. A research station is located in each of the constituent countries of Great Britain: Alice Holt in Hampshire in England; the Northern research station in Scotland and the smaller Aberystwyth Research Unit in Wales. The Alice Holt research station was the commission's first research station, established in 1946; it is the main research station of Forest Research. The Northern research station in Midlothian was opened in 1970. In 2009, a smaller research unit was established in Aberystwyth.

Forest Field and Data Services Unit is run from the Northern Research Station and maintains a network of five field stations to conduct research for the Forestry Commission and other organisations. The Technical Services Unit is also responsible for six satellite stations and the research station nurseries.

In 2006, Forest Research made Alice Holt forest the first research forest in Britain. It was followed by the Dyfi Catchment and Woodland Research Platform, Gwynedd, in 2012. Alice Holt was chosen as a research forest because it has been the base for research by the Forestry Commission since 1946 and over that time the commission maintained detailed records of the forest and experiments carried out within it.

== Recreation ==
Until the introduction of the Countryside Act 1968, the main purpose of the Forestry Commission was to maximise timber sales. The act gave the public the right to use much of the forest estate for recreation, this led to the commission providing additional facilities for the public. Sylvia Crowe was hired as a consultant to identify how to improve the landscape of commission forests for recreation. The focus on recreation allowed the Forestry Commission to become the largest provider of outdoor recreation in Britain.

The commission works with various associations involved in rambling, cycling and horse riding to promote the use of its land for recreation. A notable example is the 7stanes project in southern Scotland, where seven purpose-built areas of man-made mountain bike trails have been laid; the accessible extensions provide recreational facilities for disabled cyclists. During the summer months, it hosts a series of live music concerts across seven forests.

== Biodiversity ==
Early plantations were criticised for their lack of diversity, however the Forestry Commission has been steadily improving the value of its woodlands for wildlife. The large blocks of conifer associated with the earlier plantings were beneficial to some species such as Eurasian siskin, goldcrest, red crossbill, most members of the tit family, long-eared owl, European nightjar, roe deer, pine marten and polecat, but the greater emphasis on diversity now favours a much wider range of species, including broadleaved and open ground specialist species.

== Forests ==
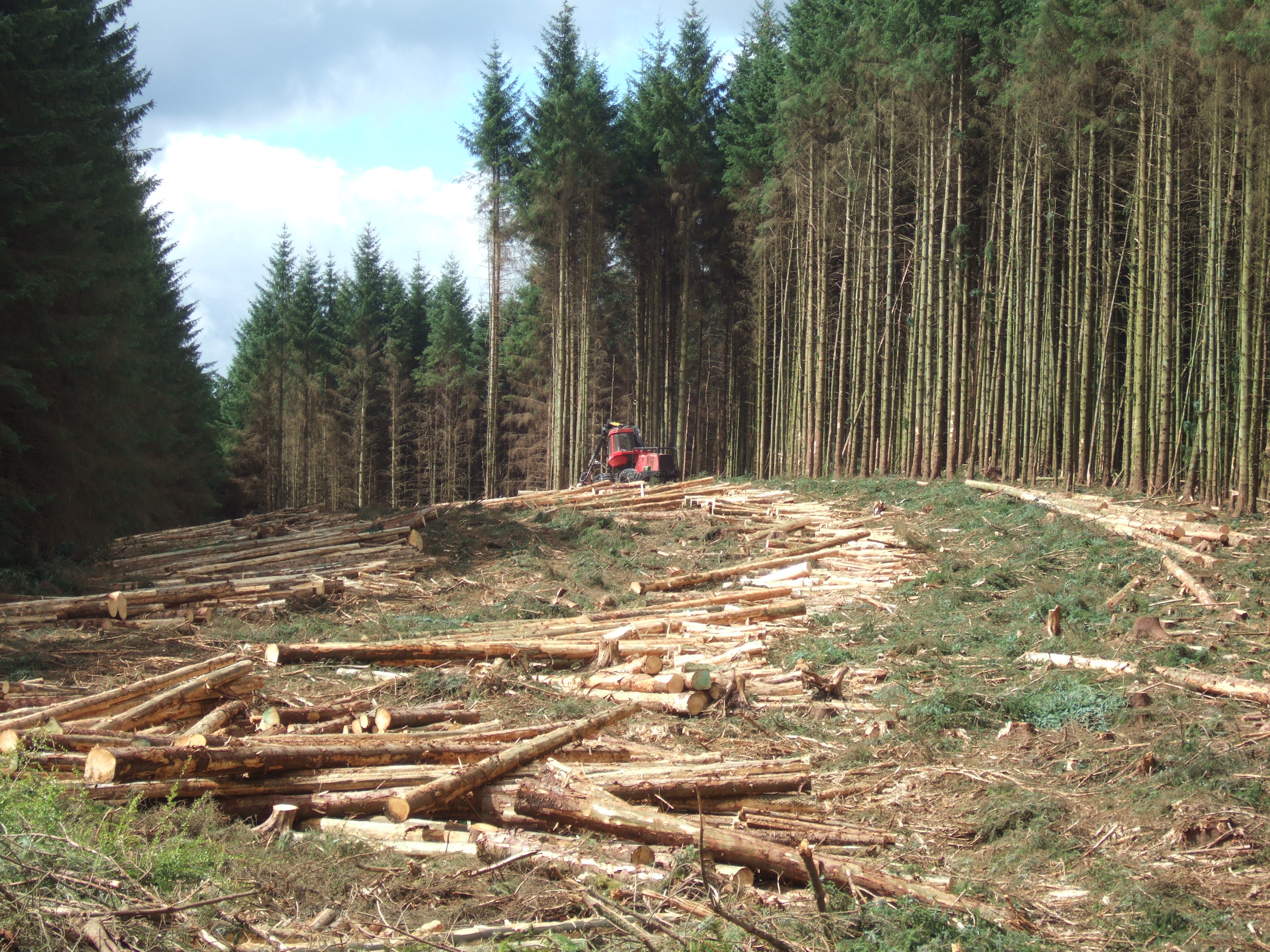
Timber harvesting at Kielder Forest in Northumberland, near the Scottish border

26% of the UK woodland (0.86 million hectares) is managed by Forestry England, Forestry and Land Scotland, Natural Resources Wales or the Northern Ireland Forest service.

When the Forestry Commission was founded in 1919 it inherited responsibility for several forests, some of which were former royal forests and contained ancient woodland. Much of the land bought by the commission in its early years was intensively planted with conifers. Kielder Forest was one of these "new" developments, having been planted in 1926, and is now the largest forest in England. It is managed by Forestry England.

The early reliance on conifers, usually of the same age class and very dark in appearance, led to criticism that the forests appeared too artificial. the commission was originally given land with poor soil quality, usually in highland areas; conifers were used because they can grow well in such difficult conditions. By the 1960s these trees were almost fully grown, and the Forestry Commission received a large number of complaints that their blanket forests were an eyesore.

Since then, landscape improvement has been a key feature of the Forestry Commission's work. All forests are covered by a Forest Design Plan (Forest Resource Plan in Wales), which aims to balance the different objectives of timber production, landscape amelioration, ecological restoration, recreation provision and other relevant objectives. Forest management is a long-term business, with plans frequently extending for a minimum of twenty-five or thirty years into the future.

== See also ==
- The Big Tree Plant
- Confederation of Forest Industries
- Woodland Carbon Code
- Community Forests in England
- English Lowlands beech forests
- List of Forestry Commission land on the Isle of Wight
- List of forests managed by the Forestry Commission
- Scotland's Environmental and Rural Services of which Forestry Commission Scotland is a member
- International Year of Forests
