= 7stanes =

Seven mountain biking centres in Scotland

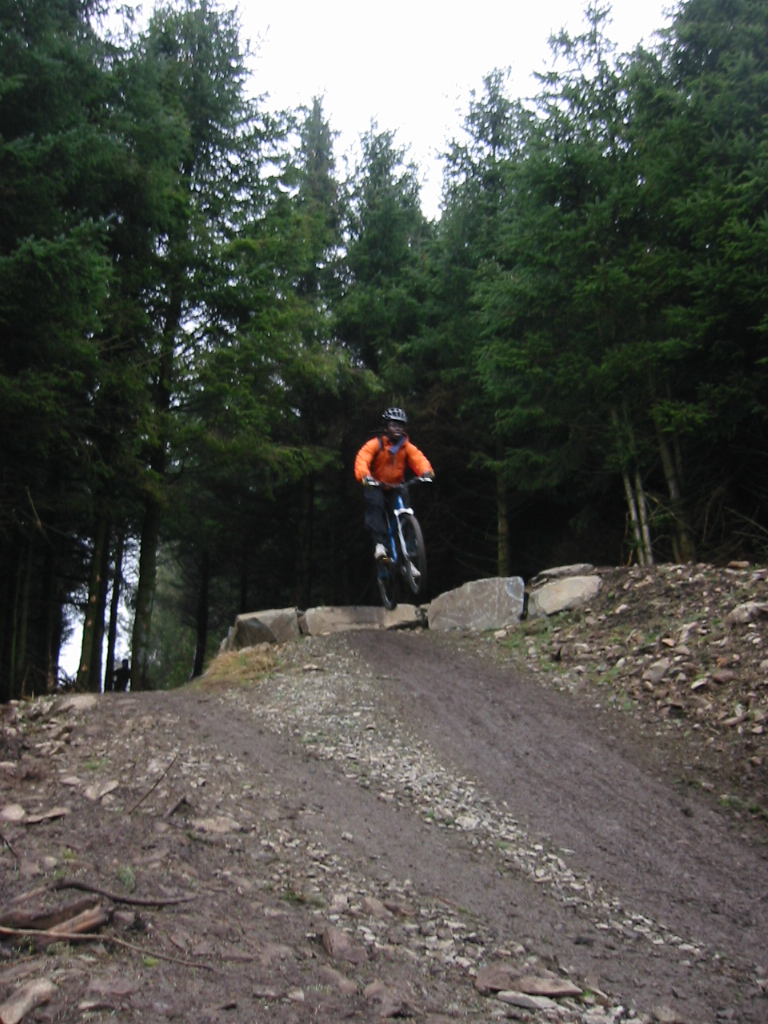
Getting air at Glentress

The 7stanes are seven mountain biking centres spanning the south of Scotland, from the heart of the Scottish Borders to Dumfries and Galloway. They are all in Forestry and Land Scotland forests and are known as the 7stanes because each venue features a 'stane' (Scots for stone), created by artist Gordon Young, somewhere along the forest trails.

== Trail grades ==
The trails use the Forestry Commission off-road trail grades:

- Green - Easy (Suitable for beginners)
- Blue - Moderate (may be singletrack and include minor obstacles; suitable for cyclists with basic off-road skills)
- Red - Difficult (mostly singletrack, many obstacles; suitable for proficient mountain bikers)
- Black - Severe (similar to red routes, with more obstacles and large challenging area; suitable for expert riders only)
- Bike Park (Orange)- Extreme (highly challenging, includes downhill sections and unavoidable jumps; suitable for expert riders only)
- Forest road and similar - these routes can be waymarked or not. The difficulty of forest roads can vary widely and this grade indicates these trails not part of a progression on to green and blue level singletrack trails.

== The 7stanes sites ==
=== Ae ===
Located around 14 km north of Dumfries. Ae features a red-grade route with optional black-graded areas and two bike park- extreme downhill routes. For less experienced riders, green and blue trails are available.

=== Dalbeattie ===
This rocky site features a green-grade and blue-graded trail, along with a red-graded trail with optional black-graded sections. These include The Slab, a challenging steep granite rock. The nearest bike shops are, Castle Douglas Cycle Centre, Studio Velo also in Castle Douglas, and MPG Cycles in Dalbeattie

=== Glentress and Innerleithen ===
Comprises two nearby sites close to Peebles in the Scottish Borders. Glentress is a well-equipped mountain biking site with a cafe, bike hire shop and showering/changing facilities. Trails include a green, blue, red and black route. There is also the skills loop- a green-graded area designed for those new to the sport and the Freeride Park which is graded bike park- extreme. The park contains technical features suited to experienced riders.

A few miles to the south-east, Innerleithen features a red-graded cross-country trail (with black-graded options), and a bike park-extreme graded downhill area. This is a particularly challenging area and riders are recommended to wear body armour and a full-face helmet. A trail centre with a cafe and bike shop (Alpine Bikes) is also located at Innerleithen

=== Glentrool ===
Located in Galloway. Glentrool includes one 58 km road-based route (the only wholly road-based route in the 7stanes) one 9 km blue-graded route, and two green-graded routes (6 km and 14 km).Nearest bike shops are Brakehut open seasonally who hire bikes to Glentrool and Kirkcowan Cycles open year-round and out of hours by appointment.

=== Kirroughtree ===
Located near Newton Stewart. Kirroughtree features green, blue, red and black trails as well as a skills area for practising mountain biking techniques. Winner of MBR Trail of the Year in 2010, the trails are located within an officially designated Dark Sky Park area. Nearest bike shops are Brakepad (at trail start) with bike hire and Kirkcowan Cycles open year-round for sales and repairs. Courtyard Cycle Hire also at Kirkcowan offer cycle hire all year round.

=== Mabie ===
Around 6.5 km south of Dumfries, Mabie sports a number of trails - green, blue, and red. A mini-cross track and skills area can be found just along the forest road from where the graded trails head outbound. Numerous Cycle shops in Dumfries.

=== Newcastleton ===
Located close to the Scotland-England border, this area includes a green skills loop, 2 blue-graded routes, a red-graded route.

== See also ==
- Forestry and Land Scotland
