= Forestry and Land Scotland =

Executive Agency of the Scottish Government

Forestry and Land Scotland Coilltearachd agus Fearann Alba

Agency overview
- Formed: 1 April 2019
- Preceding agency: Forestry Commission Scotland
- Type: Executive Agency of the Scottish Government
- Jurisdiction: Scotland
- Headquarters: Inverness
- Employees: 1,000
- Minister responsible: Mairi Gougeon MSP, Cabinet Secretary for Rural Affairs, Land Reform and Islands
- Agency executive: Kevin Quinlan, chief executive
- Website: Official website

Forestry and Land Scotland (FLS) (Scottish Gaelic: Coilltearachd agus Fearann Alba) is an executive agency responsible for managing and promoting Scotland's national forest estate: land, predominantly covered in forest, owned by the Scottish Government on behalf of the nation. It was formed on 1 April 2019, to take over some of the responsibilities of Forestry Commission Scotland, which was dissolved. The organisation exists alongside Scottish Forestry, also established on 1 April 2019, which is responsible for regulation, policy and support to landowners. Forestry and Land Scotland's key functions are to look after the national forest estate, including unforested land within this portfolio, and to produce and supply timber. Within this remit they are expected to enhance biodiversity, increase public access to the outdoors, encourage tourism and support the rural economy.

The agency has been established initially to manage only the national forest estate, however it is intended that in future it may also take over management of other publicly owned land in Scotland. This could include land currently managed by other public bodies such as Crown Estate Scotland and NatureScot; crofting estates and agricultural land owned by the Scottish Government; land owned by local authorities; and land owned by the UK Ministry of Defence.

== Operation ==
As an executive agency of the Scottish Government Forestry and Land Scotland operates at arm's length from the Scottish Government, and is regulated by Scottish Forestry. It forms part of the Scottish Government's Environment and Forestry Directorate, and reports to the Cabinet Secretary for Rural Affairs, Land Reform and Islands. FLS is headquartered in Inverness, and for organisational purposes it divides Scotland into five forest regions:

- North, covering most of Highland and the island groups of Orkney, Shetland and the Outer Hebrides
- West, covering Lochaber and the northern part of Argyll and Bute
- East, covering the area from northern Fife to the Moray Firth
- Central, covering the Central Belt, including southern Fife, southern Argyll and Bute, all of Lanarkshire and northern Ayrshire
- South, covering southern Ayrshire, Dumfries and Galloway, the Scottish Borders and the Isle of Arran

== National forest estate ==
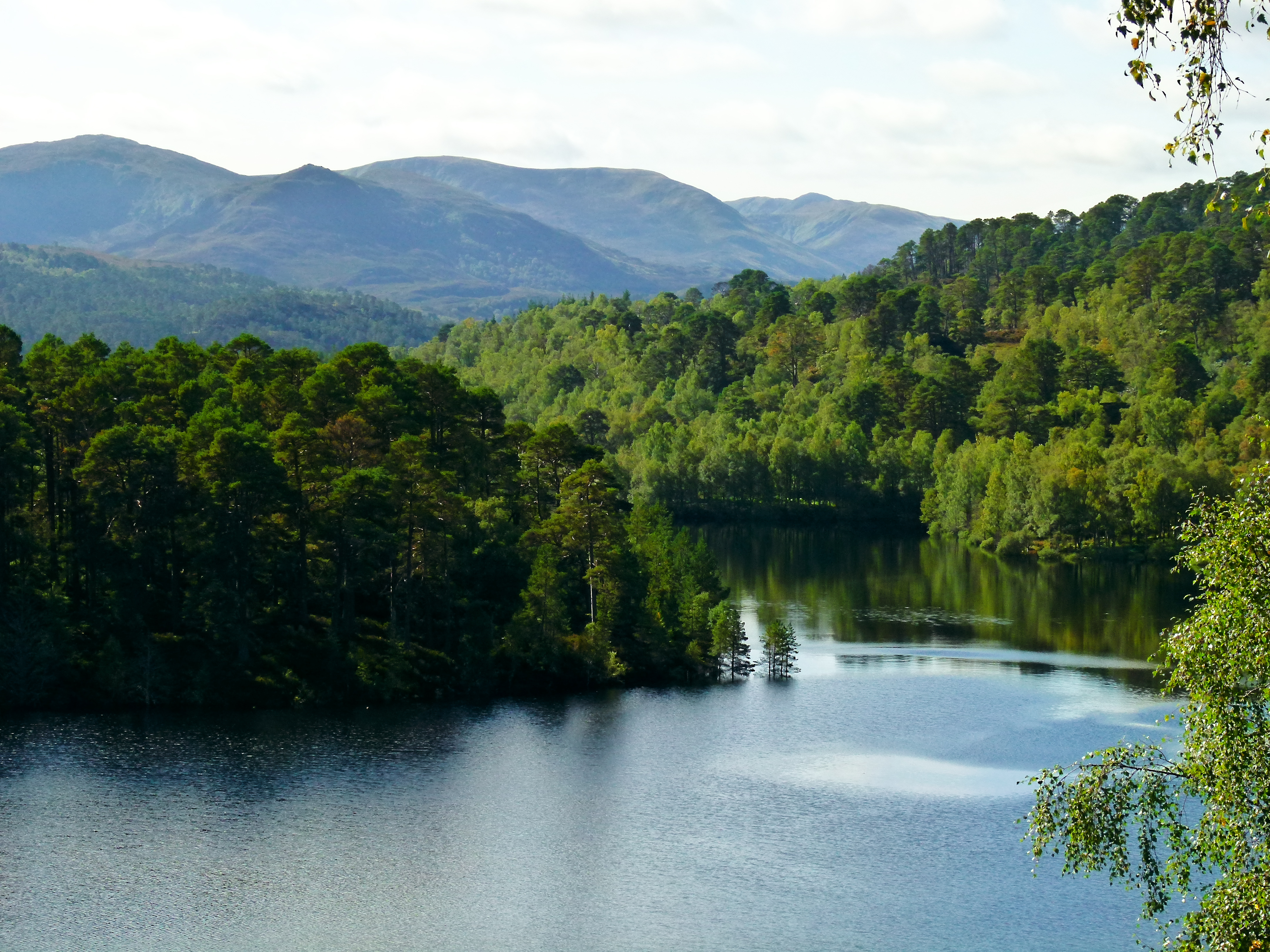
Glen Affric is a national nature reserve owned and managed by FLS.

The national forest estate consists of land owned by the Scottish Government and managed by FLS. The estate covers 6,400 km^{2} (2,500 sq mi), being roughly 8% of the land area of Scotland. Around two-thirds of this land – 4,700 km^{2} (1,800 sq mi) – is forested, with the remaining land consisting of a mixture of agricultural land and open areas such as moorland. In line with the requirement to increase public access to the outdoors and encourage tourism FLS provide facilities such as car parks, picnic areas, paths and mountain bike trails at many of their forests, and as of 2008 the national forest estate received over ten million visitors each year. FLS is responsible for over 1,200 km (750 miles) of paths for walkers, 1,300 km (810 miles) of trails for cyclists, six forest parks, five woodland parks, four national nature reserves, and the mountain biking venues of the 7stanes.

In 2015, it was estimated that national forest estate generated £395 million of Gross Value Added (GVA) for the Scottish economy each year, of which forestry and timber products accounted for £285 million, whilst tourism and recreation contributed £110 million. It was estimated that the estate supported 11,015 full-time equivalent jobs, of which 7,225 were in forestry and timber products and 3,790 were in recreation and tourism. As part of the Scottish Government's strategy for improving sustainability, benefiting communities, reducing the effects of climate change and maximising financial returns from the national forest estate FLS is actively supporting the generation of renewable energy from the estate. As of January 2019, the capacity of wind and hydro power generation installed on the national forest estate was 1086 MW.

== See also ==
- List of forests managed by Forestry and Land Scotland
- Forestry in Scotland
