= Woodland Carbon Code =

UK quality assurance standard

The Woodland Carbon Code is the quality assurance standard for UK woodland creation projects which address climate change by removing carbon dioxide from the atmosphere. It sets out the principles and requirements for developing high-quality woodland carbon projects.

The code helps landowners, organisations and businesses to address climate change by creating and supporting woodland carbon projects across the UK. It provides provides independently verified carbon units which landowners can use to generate income and organisations and companies can buy to compensate for their unavoidable UK-based emissions.

Projects can provide a range of other benefits, including:

- Enhanced biodiversity
- Local employment opportunities
- Cleaner water
- Improved air quality
- Flood prevention
- Advantages for farming
- Improvements in health and wellbeing

The Woodland Carbon Code is endorsed by the International Carbon Reduction and Offset Alliance. It also aligns to national and international standards, including the UK Forestry Standard, BSI’s Nature Investment Standards and the Integrity Council for the Voluntary Carbon Market’s Core Carbon Principles.

The Woodland Carbon Code is delivered by Scottish Forestry on behalf of the governments of the UK, Scotland, Wales and Northern Ireland.

== Impact ==
As of August 2025, projects validated to the Woodland Carbon Code have created 38,705 hectares of woodland and are predicted to sequester over 13 million tonnes of carbon dioxide equivalent over their lifetime. The code supports additional woodland creation by providing finance for voluntary projects which wouldn’t be viable without carbon credit revenue.

== Requirements ==
- Register your project on the UK Land Carbon Registry, stating the location and providing a map and carbon calculation.
- Meet national forestry standards to ensure the woodland is sustainably and responsibly managed
- Have a long-term management plan
- Use standard methods for estimating the carbon that will be sequestered
- Demonstrate that the project delivers additional carbon benefits than would otherwise have been the case

== History ==
The Woodland Carbon Code was launched in 2011 by the Forestry Commission. Since 2019, it has been delivered by Scottish Forestry on behalf of the governments of the UK, Scotland, Wales and Northern Ireland.

Year	Development
2007 to 2011	Development, consultation and piloting
2008	Executive board established
2009	Advisory board established
2011	Launch of version 1 of the code
2013	Launch of UK Woodland Carbon Registry on Markit Environmental Registry
2015	Disputes panel established
2016	Year 5 verification process launched
2018	Launch of version 2 of the code
2020	Launch of the UK Land Carbon Registry - a joint registry for Woodland Carbon Code and Peatland Code projects
2024	Nature markets strategy board established
2025	Launch of version 3 of the code

== The UK Land Carbon Registry ==
The UK Land Carbon Registry stores and displays data about Woodland Carbon Code and Peatland Code projects as well as the ownership and use of carbon units. It is managed by S&P Global.
