= Harmony Garden, Scottish Borders =

Garden in Melrose, Scottish Borders, Scotland

Coordinates: 55.5996°N 2.7200°W

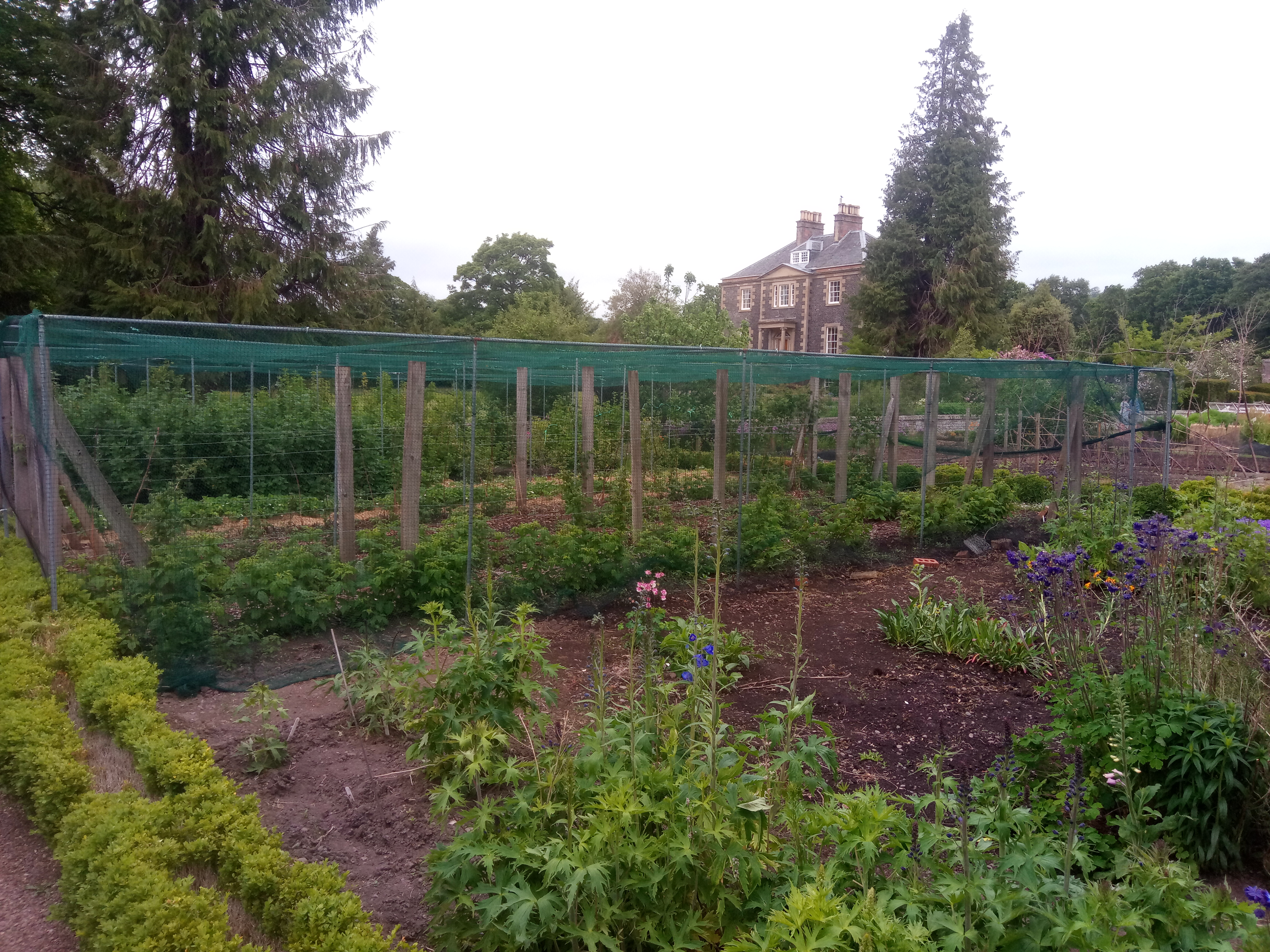
Harmony Garden and house in 2021

The Harmony Garden is the garden of Harmony Hall which is in the town of Melrose, in the Scottish Borders, administered by the National Trust for Scotland.

== History ==
The hall was built in about 1807 by Robert Waugh who had made his money, before slavery was abolished, farming limes and pimento on a plantation in Jamaica. Waugh was to claim over £3,000 for his losses when slavery was abolished in the British empire. He was said to be a recluse who only went outside to go hunting. He left his Scottish properties to his nieces when he died at the hall on 27 December 1832.

The National Trust for Scotland received the house and gardens in 1996.

== Description ==
The high walled garden is within the town and cover 3.5 acres. The gardens are divided into different areas. The hall is at the north end facing south.

The trust allows free access to visitors to the gardens while the hall is a holiday let. The trust has three further properties in the Scottish Borders. Priorwood Garden is also in Melrose, whereas Robert Smail's Printing Works is in Innerleithen and the other is the St Abb's Head National Nature Reserve.

The Borders Book Festival takes place here each summer. taking advantage of the large lawn.

== See also ==
- Gardens in Scotland
- List of places in the Scottish Borders
- List of places in Scotland
