= Robert Smail's Printing Works =

Preserved Victorian-era printworks in Scotland

Coordinates: 55.6196°N 3.0620°W

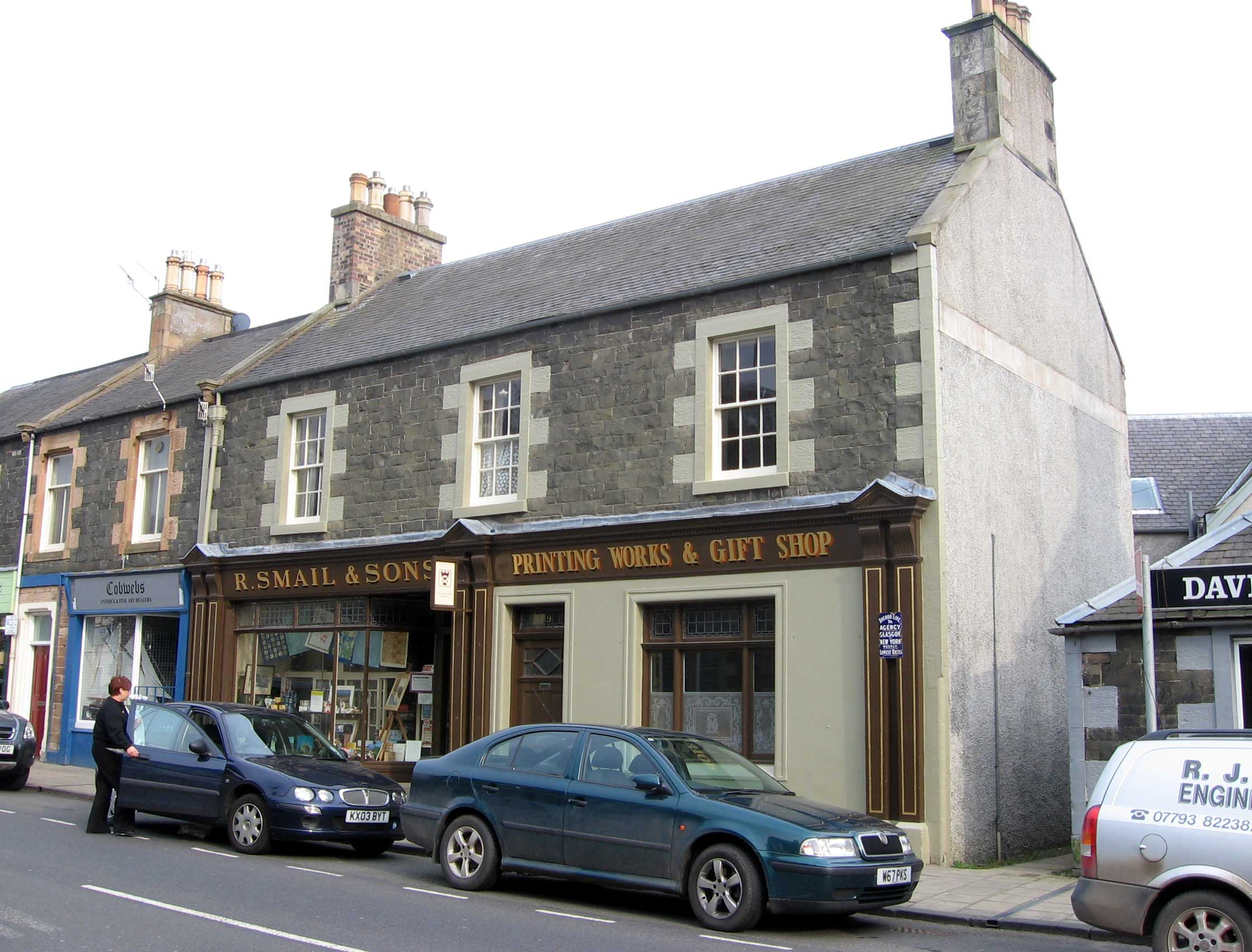
A two-storey frontage faces the main street, with the office to the right and the shop on the left.

Robert Smail's Printing Works is a fully functional Victorian era letterpress printing works in the small Scottish Borders town of Innerleithen, now preserved by The National Trust for Scotland as an Industrial Heritage museum showing visitors the operation of a local printer around 1900 while still carrying out orders for printing and stationery.

== History ==
The firm was established in 1866, carrying out print jobs for the local community as well as operating a stationer's shop, and between 1893 and 1916 published a weekly newspaper. It remained in the ownership of the Smail family, who made little effort to keep up with twentieth-century advances in technology, and, through an initiative from Innerleithen Community Council, led by Iain Henderson and Nettie Watson, was run by the third-generation owner Cowan Smail until he retired and the property was acquired by the National Trust for Scotland in 1986 and opened to the public in 1990. Visitors are given a one-hour tour showing the various stages of the process as well as a chance to try hand typesetting, and at certain times the opportunity to print their own work. The building is protected as a category C(s) listed building.

== The Printing Works ==
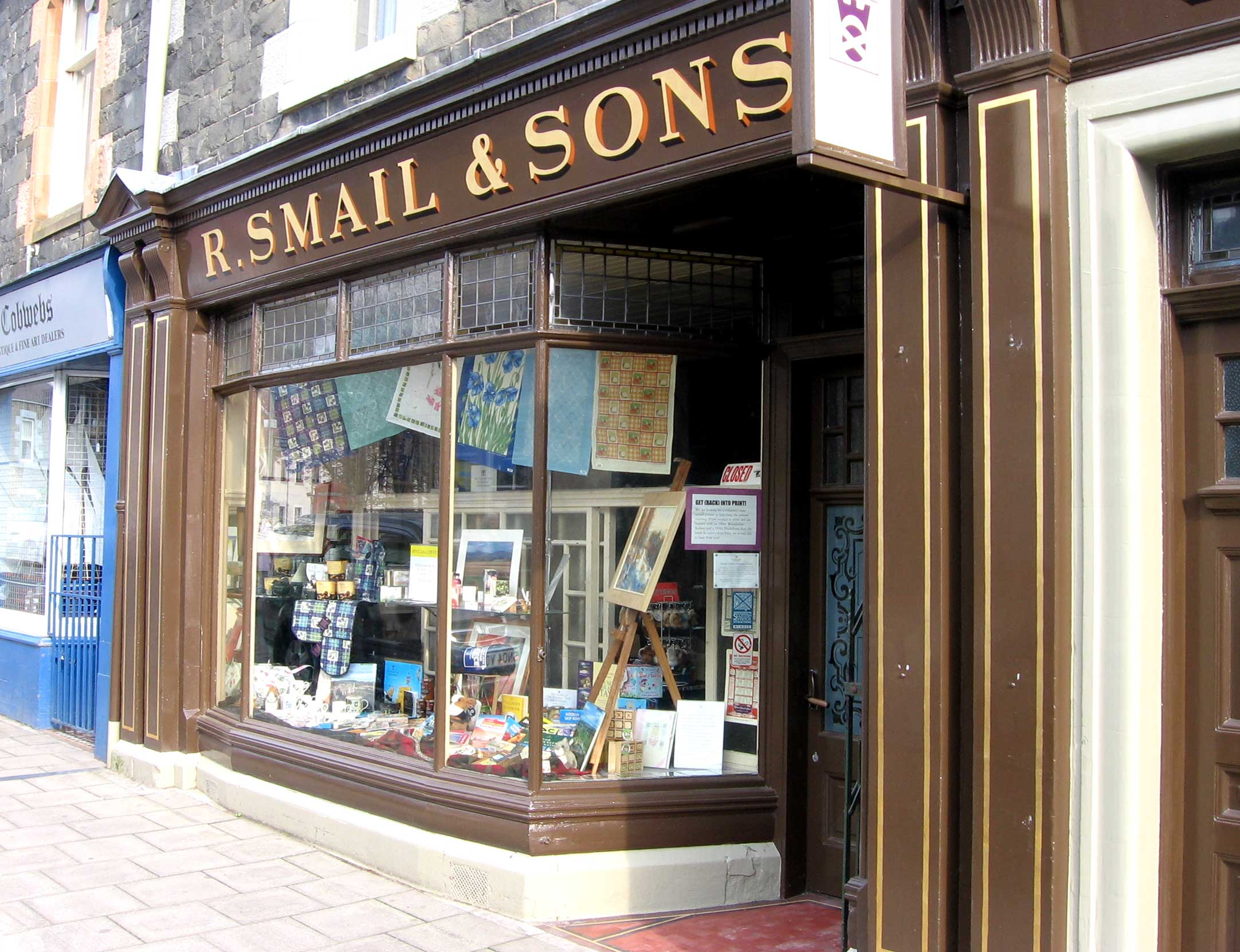
The shop is now the main entrance; the door to its right leads to the office.

The ground floor of a two-storey building on the main shopping street of the town is divided into a shop, now a gift shop and the entrance for visitors, and the printer's office. This has a connecting door to the shop as well as its own door to the street which leads to a counter for serving customers. A large desk at the office window has the clutter typical of the early twentieth century, drawers contain stationery including writing slates, pencils, sealing wax, pen nibs and bottles of ink. Wall shelves store job dockets, invoices, wages books and ledgers dating back to the start of the business. Framed photographs show how little the office has changed since 1900, and a certificate shows the authority to issue tickets for steamships to America.

=== Paper store and caseroom ===
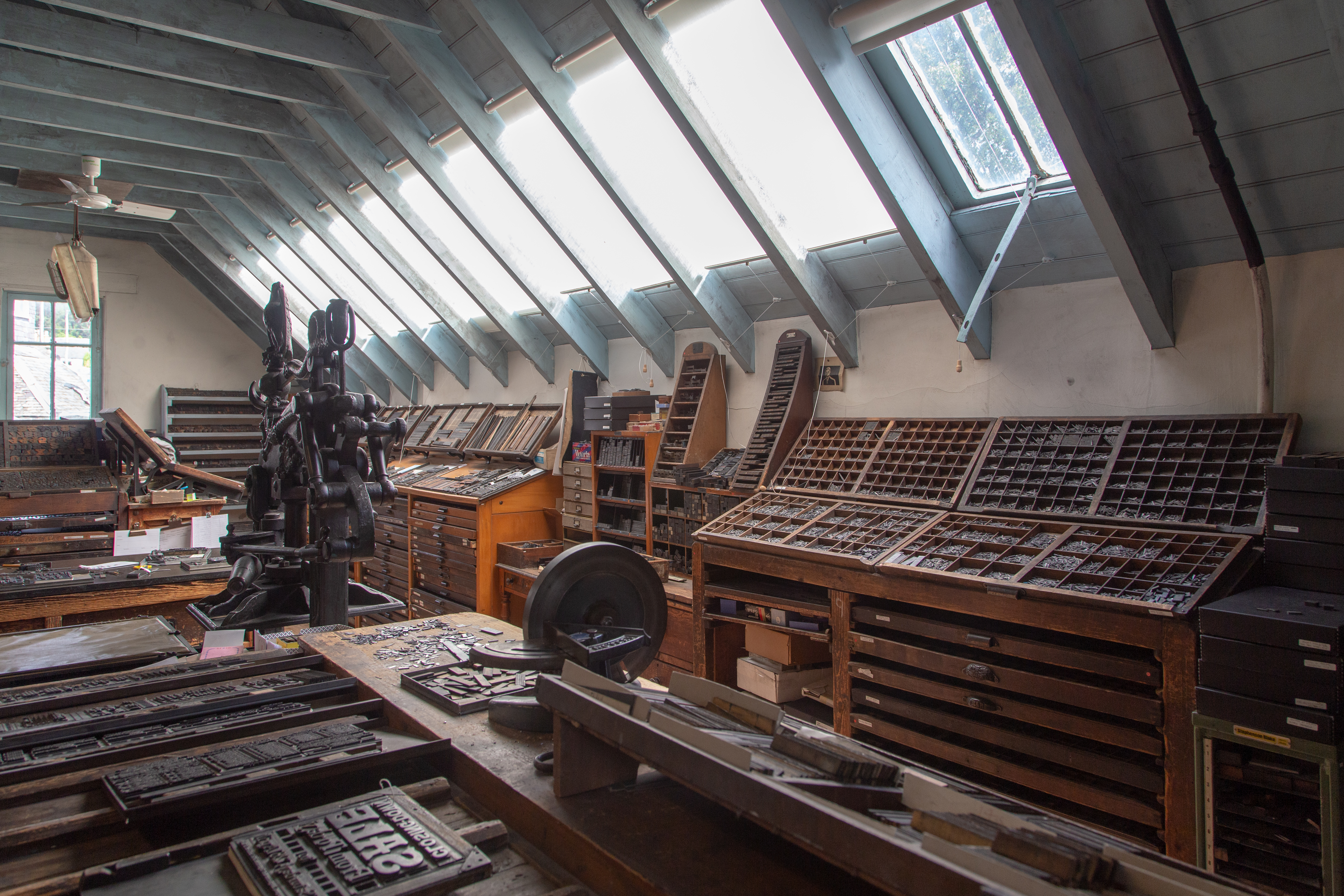
The caseroom

A door leads out the back to the paper store, a large room now housing an archive of nearly every printed job for a century. At one end the undershot water wheel which originally powered the works has been reconstructed.

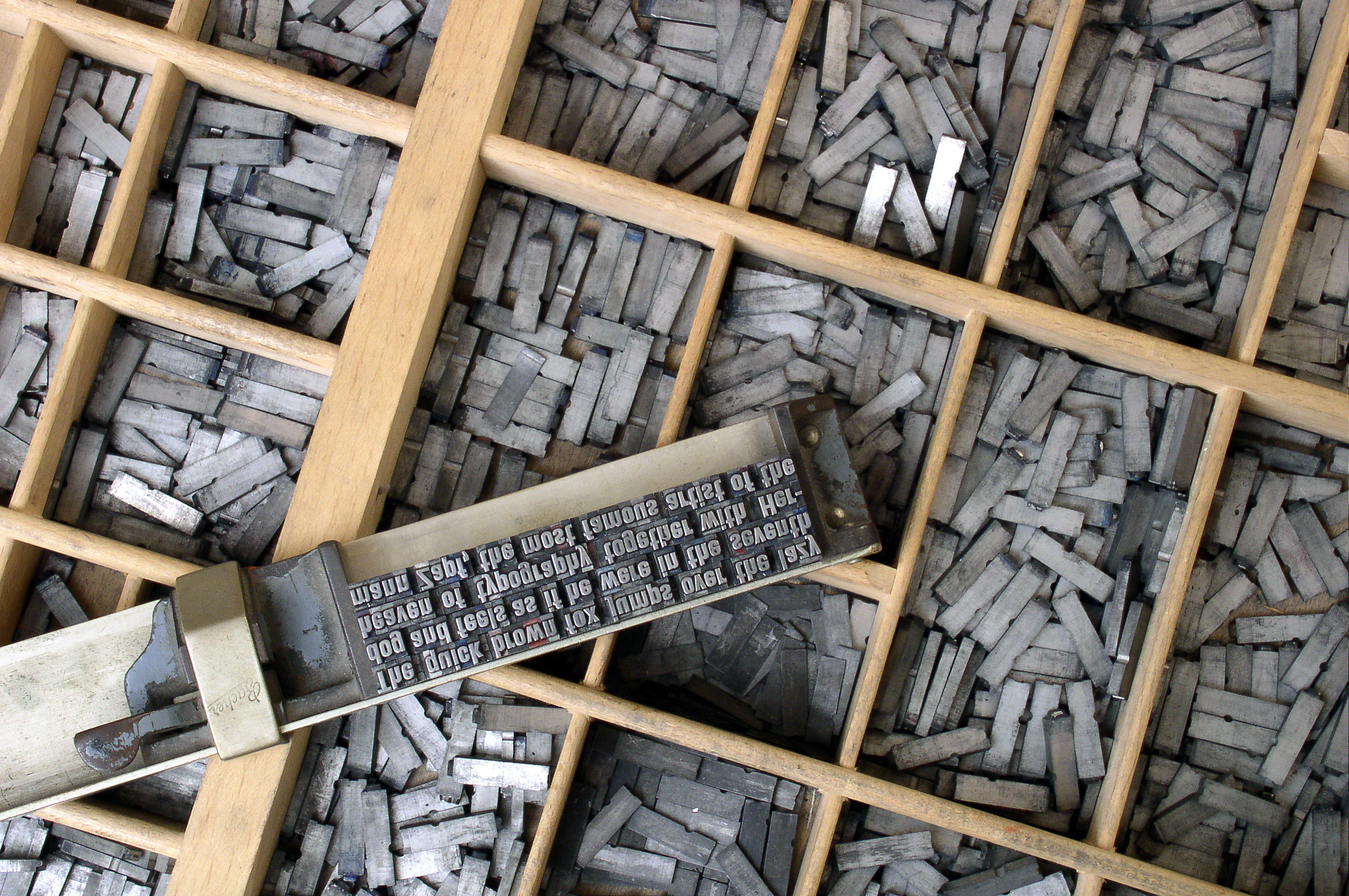
A composing stick on top of a lower letter case of movable type (image is not of the museum)

Stairs lead up to the caseroom, a large rooflet room for typesetting with racks around the perimeter of drawer-like letter cases. The racks are up to a worktop height, with the pairs of cases in use by the compositors on top so that the case of minuscule (lower-case) letters is at a shallow angle, and the case of majuscule (capital or upper-case) letters stands above and behind it at a steep angle leaning against the wall. The letters are cast metal sorts, and visitors are shown by the compositor how to set this movable type by hand into a metal composing stick. He then binds the type forme set by each visitor in a galley, and (time permitting) prints these using a hand-operated printing press to make a galley proof of each for the visitor. The room also has many galleys which were made up and set aside for possible future use, including the last job set by Cowan Smail, "Closing Down Sale from Today".

=== Machineroom ===
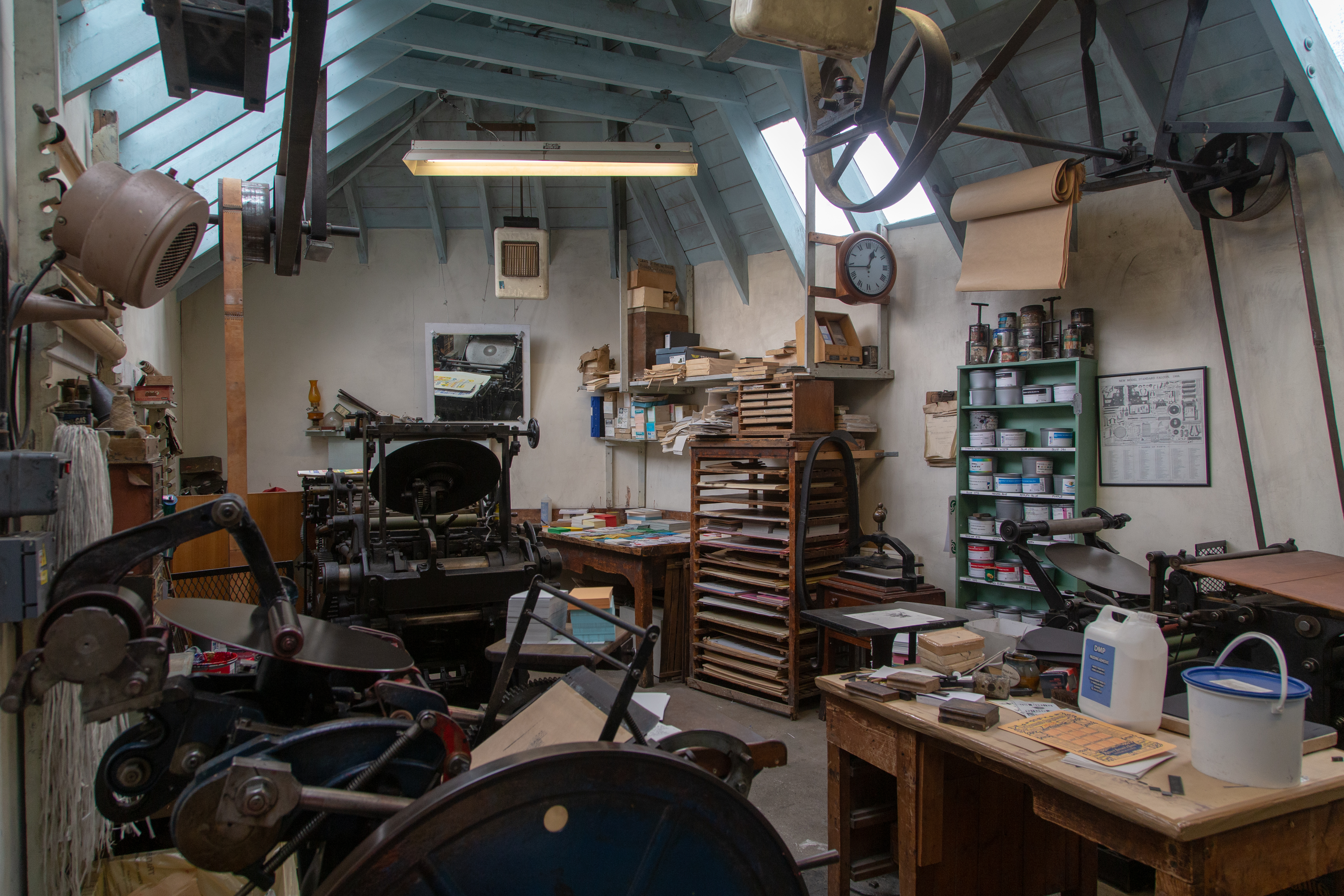
One end of the machine room

The machineroom is also rooflet, and the printing presses include a hand-fed pedal-operated platen press, a large belt-driven Wharfedale Reliance print machine bought in the 1870s which was originally powered by belt drive from the water wheel, and an automated Heidelberg Platen bought in 1952. A printer demonstrates the operation of these machines to the visitors.

== Events ==
Robert Smail's Printing Works has printing workshops in the winter, and participates in events such as the Innerleithen Honey Festival at St Ronan's Wells. In September 2007 "living history tours" were introduced on the occasion of the celebrations of 500 years of printing in Scotland.

== See also ==
The National Trust for Scotland has three further properties in the Scottish Borders:

- Priorwood Garden
- Harmony Garden
- St Abb's Head National Nature Reserve
- List of places in the Scottish Borders
- Damside
