= Scottish Borders =

Council area of Scotland

Scottish Borders Crìochan na h-Alba (Scottish Gaelic) The Mairches (Scots)
- Council area
- Scottish Borders shown within Scotland
- Coordinates: 55°21′36″N 2°29′24″W
- Sovereign state: United Kingdom
- Country: Scotland
- Lieutenancy areas: Berwickshire; Roxburgh, Ettrick and Lauderdale; Tweeddale
- Unitary authority: 1 April 1996
- Administrative HQ: Council Headquarters, Newtown St Boswells

Government
  - Type: Council
  - Body: Scottish Borders Council
  - Control: No overall control
  - MPs: 2 MPs: John Lamont (C); David Mundell (C)
  - MSPs: 2 MSPs: Christine Grahame (SNP); Rachael Hamilton (C)

Area
  - Total: 1,827 sq mi (4,732 km^{2})
  - Rank: 6th

Population (2025)
  - Total: 116,800
  - Rank: 17th
  - Density: 65/sq mi (25/km^{2})
- Time zone: UTC+0 (GMT)
  - Summer (DST): UTC+1 (BST)
- ISO 3166 code: GB-SCB
- GSS code: S12000026
- Website: scotborders.gov.uk

The Scottish Borders (Scottish Gaelic: Crìochan na h-Alba; Scots: The Mairches), known simply as the Borders within Scotland and North East England, is one of the country's 32 council areas. It is bordered by West Lothian, Edinburgh, Midlothian, and East Lothian to the north, the North Sea to the east, Dumfries and Galloway to the south-west, South Lanarkshire to the west, and the English ceremonial counties of Cumbria and Northumberland to the south. The area's largest settlement is Galashiels; its administrative centre is Newtown St Boswells.

The council area occupies approximately the same area as the historic shires of Berwickshire, Peeblesshire, Roxburghshire, and Selkirkshire. The term "Scottish Borders" is also used for the areas of southern Scotland and northern England that bound the Anglo-Scottish border, namely Dumfries and Galloway, the Scottish Borders, Northumberland and Cumbria.

== History ==
The term Borders sometimes has a wider use, referring to all of the counties adjoining the English border, also including Dumfriesshire and Kirkcudbrightshire, as well as Northumberland, Cumberland and Westmorland in England.

Roxburghshire and Berwickshire historically bore the brunt of the conflicts with England, both during declared wars such as the Wars of Scottish Independence, and armed raids which took place in the times of the Border Reivers. During this period, at the western end of the border there was a strip of country, called the "Debatable Land", because the possession of it was a constant source of contention between England and Scotland until its boundaries were adjusted in 1552. Thus, across the region are to be seen the ruins of many castles, abbeys and even towns. The only other important conflict belongs to the Covenanters' time, when the marquess of Montrose was defeated at the Battle of Philiphaugh in 1645. Partly for defence and partly to overawe the freebooters and moss-troopers who were a perpetual threat until they were suppressed later in the 17th century, castles were erected at various points on both sides of the border.

From early on, the two sovereigns agreed on the duty to regulate the borders. The Scottish Marches system was set up, under the control of three wardens from each side, who generally kept the peace through several centuries until being replaced by the Middle Shires under James VI/I.

=== Administrative history ===
Prior to 1975 the area that is now Scottish Borders was administered as the four separate counties of Berwickshire, Peeblesshire, Roxburghshire, and Selkirkshire, plus part of Midlothian. An elected county council was established for each county in 1890 under the Local Government (Scotland) Act 1889. The county councils were abolished in 1975 under the Local Government (Scotland) Act 1973, which established a two-tier structure of local government comprising upper-tier regions and lower-tier districts. A region called Borders was created covering the area. The region contained four districts, called Berwickshire, Ettrick and Lauderdale, Roxburgh, and Tweeddale.

Further local government reform in 1996 under the Local Government etc. (Scotland) Act 1994 saw the area's four districts and the regional council abolished, with a new unitary authority created covering the same area as the former Borders Region. The 1994 Act called the new council area "The Borders", but the shadow council elected in 1995 to oversee the transition changed the name to "Scottish Borders" prior to the changes coming into effect in 1996.

== Geography ==
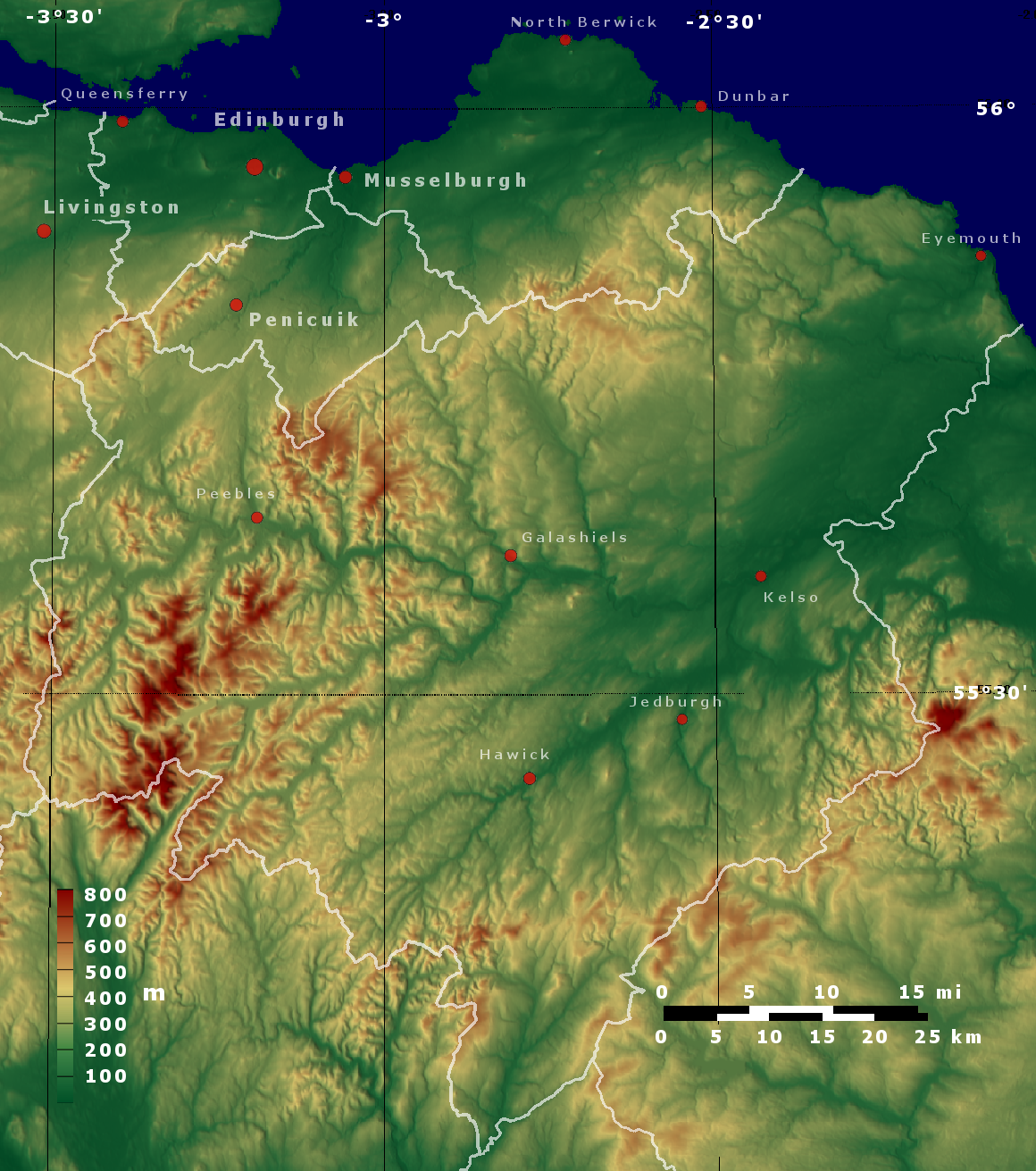
Topographic map of Scottish Borders and Lothian

The Scottish Borders are in the eastern part of the Southern Uplands. The region is hilly and largely rural, with the River Tweed flowing west to east through it. The highest hill in the region is Broad Law in the Manor Hills. In the east of the region, the area that borders the River Tweed is flat and is known as 'The Merse'. The Tweed and its tributaries drain the entire region with the river flowing into the North Sea at Berwick-upon-Tweed in Northumberland, and forming the border with England for the last twenty miles or so of its length.

The term Central Borders refers to the area in which the majority of the main towns and villages of Galashiels, Selkirk, Hawick, Jedburgh, Earlston, Kelso, Newtown St Boswells, St Boswells, Peebles, Melrose and Tweedbank are located.

Two of Scotland's 40 national scenic areas (defined so as to identify areas of exceptional scenery and to ensure their protection from inappropriate development) lie within the region:

- The Eildon and Leaderfoot National Scenic Area covers the scenery surrounding Eildon Hill, usually called the Eildons because of the three 'peaks', and extends to include the town of Melrose and Leaderfoot Viaduct.
- The Upper Tweeddale National Scenic Area covers the scenery surrounding the upper part of the River Tweed between Broughton and Peebles.

== Population ==
At the census held on 27 March 2011, the population of the region was 113,870 (final total), an increase of 6.66% from the 106,764 enumerated at the previous (2001) census. The Census of 20 March 2022 produced a population of 116,821.

== Language and literature ==
Although there is evidence of some Scottish Gaelic in the origins of place names such as Innerleithen ("confluence of the Leithen"), Kilbucho and Longformacus, which contain identifiably Goidelic rather than Brythonic Celtic elements and are an indication of at least a Gaelic-speaking elite in the area, the main languages in the area since the 5th century appear to have been Brythonic (in the west) and Old English (in the east), the latter of which developed into its modern forms of English and Scots.

The 2022 Scottish Census reported that out of 114,118 residents aged three and over, 889 (0.8%) considered themselves able to speak or read Gaelic.

Border ballads occupied a distinctive place in literature. Many of them were rescued from oblivion by Walter Scott, who gathered materials for his Minstrelsy of the Scottish Border, which appeared in 1802 and 1803. Border traditions and folklore, and the picturesque incidents of which the country was so often the scene, appealed strongly to James Hogg ("the Ettrick Shepherd"), John Wilson, writing as "Christopher North", and John Mackay Wilson, whose Tales of the Borders, published in 1835, enjoyed popular favour throughout the 1800s.

The 2022 Scottish Census reported that out of 114,114 residents aged three and over, 38,542 (33.8%) considered themselves able to speak or read the Scots language."

== Transport ==
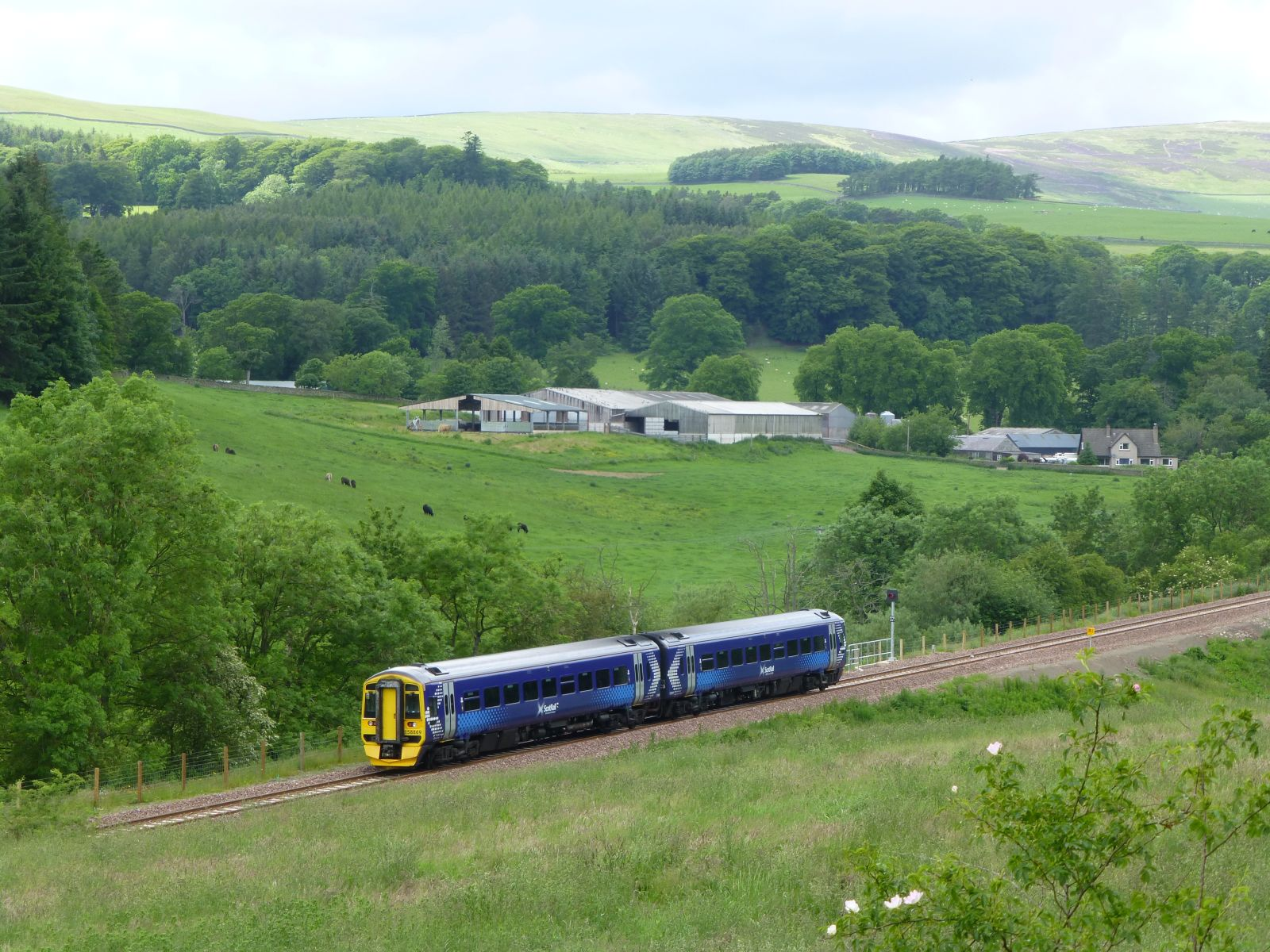
A ScotRail train on the Borders Railway line

Until September 2015, the region had no working railway stations. Although the area was well connected to the Victorian railway system, the branch lines that supplied it were closed in the decades following the Second World War. A bill was passed by the Scottish Parliament to extend the Waverley Line, which aimed to re-introduce a commuter service from Edinburgh to Stow, Galashiels and Tweedbank. This section of the route re-opened on 6 September 2015, under the Borders Railway branding. The other railway route running through the region is the East Coast Main Line, with East Linton, Dunbar and Berwick being the nearest stations on that line, all of which are outwith the Borders. Since 2022, after much discussion a railway station was re-opened at Reston which is within the region and serves Eyemouth. To the west, Carlisle, Carstairs and Lockerbie are the nearest stations on the West Coast Main Line.

The area is served by buses which connect the main population centres. Express bus services link the main towns with rail stations at Edinburgh and Carlisle.

The region also has no commercial airports; the nearest are Edinburgh and Newcastle, both of which are international airports.

The main roads to and from the region are:

- The A1, which runs along the east coast from London to Edinburgh; passing near Eyemouth.
- The A7 which runs north to south from Edinburgh to Carlisle and the M6; passing through Galashiels, Selkirk and Hawick.
- The A68 running from Darlington to Edinburgh; passing through Jedburgh, St Boswells, Earlston and Lauder.
- The A72, which runs east to west from Galashiels to Hamilton; passing through Innerleithen and Peebles

== Media ==
In terms of television, the area is covered by BBC Scotland broadcasting from Glasgow and ITV Border which broadcast from Gateshead. Television signals are received from the Selkirk TV transmitter.

Radio stations are provided by BBC Radio Scotland which broadcast the local opt-out from its studios in Selkirk. The commercial radio station, Greatest Hits Radio Scottish Borders and North Northumberland broadcasts from Edinburgh but still broadcast local news bulletins to the area as well as to Berwick-upon Tweed in Northumberland.

The area is served by the main local newspapers: Southern Reporter and The Border Telegraph.

== Governance ==
The Scottish Borders is served by Scottish Borders Council.

The first election to the Borders Regional Council was held in 1974. The council came into force on 16 May 1975. Another shadow authority was again elected in 1995 ahead of council reforms which came into being on 1 April 1996.

Following the 2022 Election the council remained under no overall control, with the Conservatives leading the council with the support of 3 independents.

== Wider politics ==
=== Referendums ===
In the 2014 Scottish independence referendum, Scottish Borders had the second highest 'No' vote of 66.6%. Orkney had the highest 'No' vote of 67.2%, third and fourth highest were Dumfries and Galloway (65.7%) and Shetland (63.7%).

In the 2016 United Kingdom European Union membership referendum, 58.5% voted 'Remain'.

==== Constituencies ====
There are two British Parliamentary constituencies in the Scottish Borders; Berwickshire, Roxburgh and Selkirk covers most of the region and is represented by John Lamont of the Conservatives. The western Tweeddale area is included in the Dumfriesshire, Clydesdale and Tweeddale and is represented by David Mundell of the Conservatives.

At Scottish Parliament level, there are also two seats. The eastern constituency is Ettrick, Roxburgh and Berwickshire, which is currently represented by Conservative Rachael Hamilton. The western constituency is Midlothian South, Tweeddale and Lauderdale and is represented by SNP Christine Grahame.

== Settlements ==
The largest settlements in Scottish Borders

Largest settlements by population:

Settlement	Population	
Settlement	2011	2020
Galashiels	14,994	15,490 (Note: Includes Langlee and Tweedbank)
Hawick	14,294	13,620 (Note: Includes Burnfoot)
Peebles	8,376	9,000
Kelso	5,639	6,870
Selkirk	5,784	4,540
Jedburgh	4,030	3,860
Eyemouth	3,546	3,580
Innerleithen	3,031	3,180
Duns	2,753	2,820
Melrose	2,307	2,500

== Places of interest ==
- Abbotsford House
- Berwickshire Coastal Path
- Bowhill House
- Cheviot Hills
- Cessford Burn
- Coldingham Bay
- Dawyck Botanic Garden
- Dryburgh Abbey – Historic Scotland
- Duns Castle
- Edin's Hall Broch
- Ettrick Forest
- Eyemouth
- Floors Castle
- Glentress Forest – Forest Enterprise
- Greenknowe Tower
- Harmony Garden – National Trust for Scotland
- Hawkshaw – ancestral home of the Porteous family
- Hermitage Castle – Historic Scotland
- Jedburgh Abbey – Historic Scotland
- Kailzie Gardens
- Kelso Abbey
- Kirna House (The Kirna, previously Grangehill)
- Lammermuir Hills
- Lauderdale
- Manderston
- Megget Reservoir
- Mellerstain House
- Melrose Abbey – Historic Scotland
- Mire Loch
- Monteviot
- Morebattle
- Neidpath Castle
- Nisbet, Berwickshire
- Nisbet, Roxburghshire
- Paxton House
- Pennine Way – National Trails
- Priorwood Garden – National Trust for Scotland
- Robert Smail's Printing Works – National Trust for Scotland
- Scots' dike
- Smailholm Tower – Historic Scotland
- Southern Upland Way – National Trails
- St. Abbs Head
- St. Mary's Loch
- St. Ronans Wells
- Teviotdale
- Thirlestane Castle
- Traquair House
- Trimontium and the Eildons
- Union Bridge
- Waterloo Monument
- Wedderburn Castle

== See also ==
- Borders College
- Scottish Marches
- Anglo-Scottish border
- Debatable lands
- List of places in the Scottish Borders
- Scottish Lowlands
- Alexander Jeffrey, historian of Scottish Borders
