= Innerleithen =

Town in Scottish Borders, Scotland

Coordinates: 55.61841°N 3.05901°W

- Location within the Scottish Borders
- Population: 3,152 (2022)
- OS grid reference: NT334366
- Council area: Scottish Borders
- Lieutenancy area: Tweeddale
- Country: Scotland
- Sovereign state: United Kingdom
- Post town: Innerleithen
- Postcode district: EH44
- Dialling code: 01896
- Police: Scotland
- Fire: Scottish
- Ambulance: Scottish
- UK Parliament: Dumfriesshire, Clydesdale and Tweeddale
- Scottish Parliament: Midlothian South, Tweeddale and Lauderdale

Innerleithen is a market town and civil parish in the committee area of Tweeddale, in the Scottish Borders, Scotland. It was formerly in the historic county of Peeblesshire or Tweeddale. It had a population of 3,152 in 2022.

== Etymology ==
The name "Innerleithen" comes from the Scottish Gaelic meaning "confluence of the Leithen", because it is here that the river joins the Tweed. The element "inner" or "inver" (from Gaelic inbhir) is common in Scottish placenames, occurring for example in Inverness and Inverurie. At this confluence, the Tweed flows approximately west-east, and the Leithen Water flows from the north.

== Layout ==
The layout of the town is dominated by the surrounding hills: to the north, the peaked hill of Lee Pen (502m) and its southerly spur Caerlee Hill (258m); to the east, the rounded hill of Pirn Craig (363m) – locally known as "Rocky" – and its townward spur of Windy Knowe (155m), also known as "Pirn Hill"; and to the south, beyond the Tweed, the extended of ridge of Plora Craig rising sharply from the southerly bank. The town has thus grown in an inverted "T" shape, north up the valley of the Leithen and east-west along the floodplain of the Tweed.

== History ==
The area occupied by the town has been inhabited since pre-Roman times. The remains of an Iron Age palisaded settlement, with seven circular houses are visible on the summit of Caerlee Hill. This is a scheduled Ancient Monument. Ditchworks are also visible on the hill of Windy Knowe and, whilst there is some local speculation that these belong to an unusual round Roman hill fort, they are in fact typical of an indigenous Iron Age hill fort. Crop marks from aerial photographs of the 1950s suggest the existence of a semi-permanent Roman marching camp on the flood plain by the river Tweed at Toll Wood (near Traquair) and at nearby Eshiels.

The town is said to have been founded in A.D. 737 by an itinerant pilgrim monk called St. Ronan, who came to Innerleithen via the River Tweed in a coracle. Monks would certainly have travelled the natural route of the Clyde and Tweed valleys on their way between the religious centres of Iona and Holy Island. A Celtic stone carved with cup and rings/channels, known as the Runic Cross (although there are neither runes on it, nor any evidence that it was a cross shaft) was found on the slopes of the Leithen valley suggesting that a church existed during the Early Middle Ages. The stone can be viewed in the courtyard of the parish church on Leithen Road.

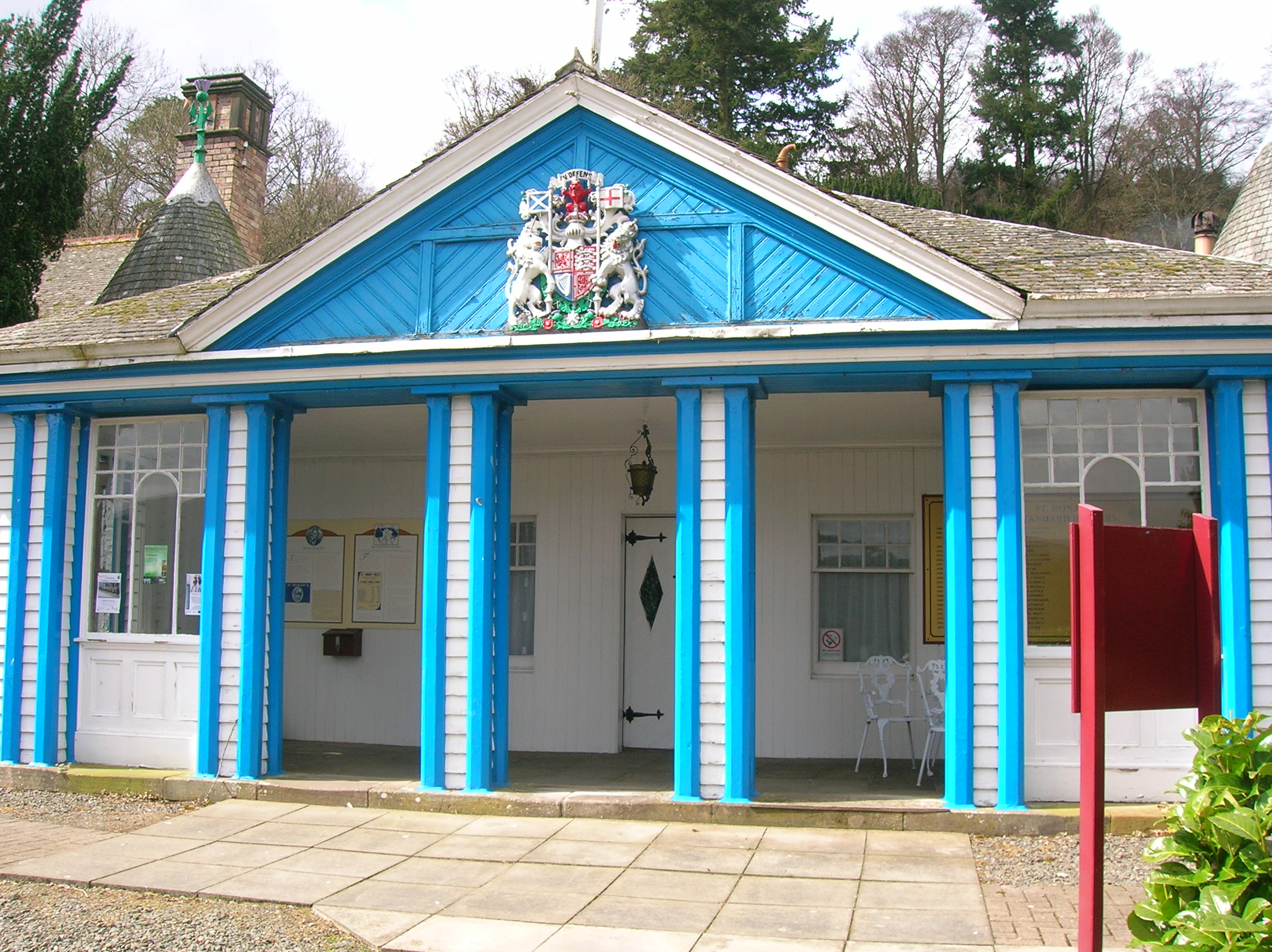
Saint Ronan's Wells

In the local legend of the town's founding "St. Ronan Cleik't the Deil by the hind leg and banished him", possibly a metaphor for the monks bringing Christian learning back into these regions.

A vacancy in the parish church from 1695 to 1697 allowed a surplus of funds in the parish, allowing the money to be spent on the first bridge over the Leithen in 1701 (locally called the Cuddy Bridge) around 400m north of the High Street. The narrow bridge is still used for pedestrian traffic.

The legend was actually formalised by Sir Walter Scott and was later instigated in a town festival called "The Cleikum Ceremonies" in 1901. This was seen as a way to prevent the legends and folktales of the region from dying out. Scott wrote about the town in his 1824 novel St. Ronan's Well.

The Ceremonies continue to this day as part of St. Ronans Borders Games, also known as "Games Week" (although, in reality, this is a 10-day-long festival). The Border Games date from 1827 and are the oldest organised sports meeting in Scotland. These happen in the first and second week in July and draw significant local and tourist participation.

Accounts of Innerleithen date from the 12th century, when it was recorded as "Inverlethane". It is said that a son of King Malcolm IV of Scotland (who was staying at Traquair House on a hunting trip), drowned accidentally in a deep pool at the confluence of the rivers Leithen and Tweed. The body was recovered by locals and taken to the church, in recognition of which the King bestowed the right of sanctuary to the land. The pool where the drowning is alleged to have taken place is still known locally as "The Droont Pool". However, it should be borne in mind that Malcolm IV is reported to have died childless at the age of twenty five, so the tale is questionable.

Later written accounts of the town date from the 15th century when it is referred to as "Henderleithen", and at this point it is recorded as a hamlet within the Parish of Traquair, which with its major baronial house was centre of the Parish.

The industrial revolution and wool milling saw Innerleithen outgrow Traquair and become the larger village. Innerleithen's population rose from 1130 (1861 census) to its current level of over 2500. At one point it had five significant wool mills (or hosieries). Of these, only one, Caerlee Mills remained with a reduced workforce of 33 after its owners JJ & HB Cashmere went into administration in 2010, finally closing in April 2013.

The industries which have supplanted the wool industry and allowed the town to keep growing have been primarily tourism, of which Mountain Biking plays a huge part, and secondly, timber and forestry. Additionally, a significant proportion of the population now commutes to work, including to Edinburgh some 30 miles north. The town has a football team, Vale of Leithen, who were established in 1891 and play in the East of Scotland Football League. They play their games at the town's Victoria Park.

== Tourism ==
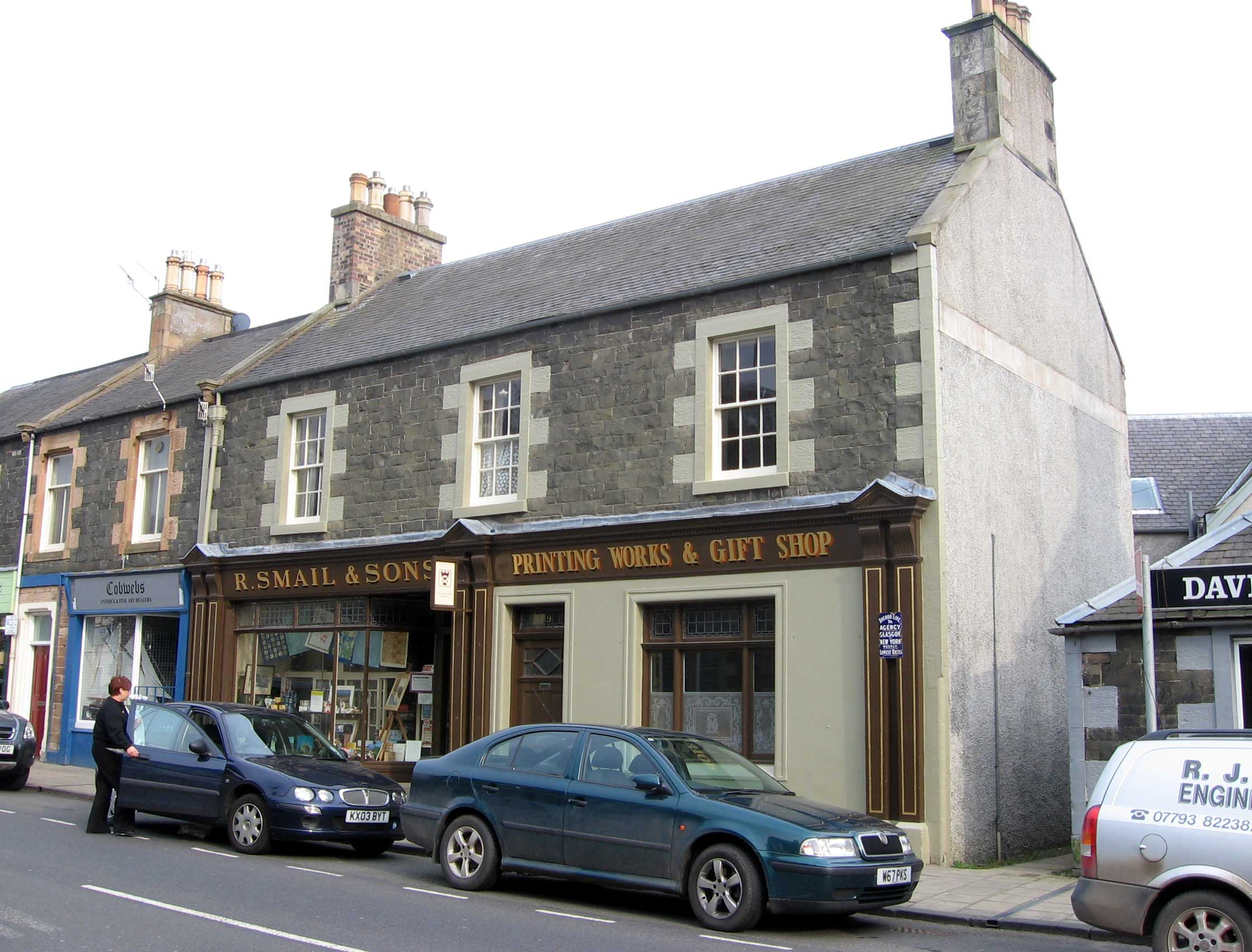
Robert Smail's Printing Works typifies the buildings on the main street.

Tourist attractions within the town include Robert Smail's Printing Works and St. Ronans Wells, and nearby Traquair House. Popular tourist activities in the area include golfing (the town has a 9-hole golf course), walking and mountain biking. The area is famous for fly fishing (both trout and salmon), and there is a fish ladder near the golf course, just outside the town boundary on Leithen Road. This proves a popular stopping point for locals and visitors to watch the autumn and winter runs of salmon.

The town has several small hotels including the Traquair Arms Hotel and the St. Ronans Hotel. There are also numerous private houses offering bed and breakfast, a camp site and a caravan site.

The town hosts the annual Innerleithen Music Festival in the Memorial Hall. In addition, it has an active amateur operatic society which stages an annual production.

To get to Innerleithen from Edinburgh, follow the A701, then A703 south from Edinburgh, and at Peebles turn east onto the A72. The town is also served by the Borders Buses X62 service which runs between Edinburgh and Galashiels via Penicuik, Peebles and Innerleithen

Innerleithen has several bookshops, the largest of which holds nearly 19,000 titles and is one of the largest in the Scottish Borders.

Innerleithen is also popular for mountain biking and, together with Glentress, forms one of Forestry and Land Scotland's "7 Stanes". It is very popular with downhill bikers and has hosted national events since the early 1990s. An uplift shuttle bus service provides access to the top of Plora Rig, ready for riders to plummet back down the trails. Current gems include the "Matador" and "Make or Break". In recent years the "Golfie" trails in Caberston Forest have been widely developed and sanctioned, providing a unique network of rider managed technically demanding MTB descents. In addition to the downhill trails, there is a long cross-country loop that climbs to the top of the Minch Moor before descending through some excellent trails. The Innerleithen XC trails are more demanding than those found at Glentress.

Since 2003, the town has held a music festival every August. Acts that have played at the festival include Eddi Reader, Julie Fowlis, Dougie MacLean, Karine Polwart, Karen Matheson and Old Blind Dogs.

== Twinning ==
=== Twin town ===
Innerleithen is twinned with:

- Le Nouvion-en-Thiérache, Aisne, France

=== Twin community ===
The town of Innerleithen has been twinned with the community of Thondwe in Malawi since 2008. Both the local church and the Rotary Club are involved.

== Notable people ==
- Murray Davidson (b. 1988), international footballer who played for Livingston F.C. and St Johnstone F.C.
- Mike Heron (b. 1942), musician, member of The Incredible String Band
- Alexander Tait (poet) (b. 1720), known as "Sawney Tait", contemporary and associate of Robert Burns and David Sillar
- George Hope Tait (b. 1861) painter, designer, poet and civic leader
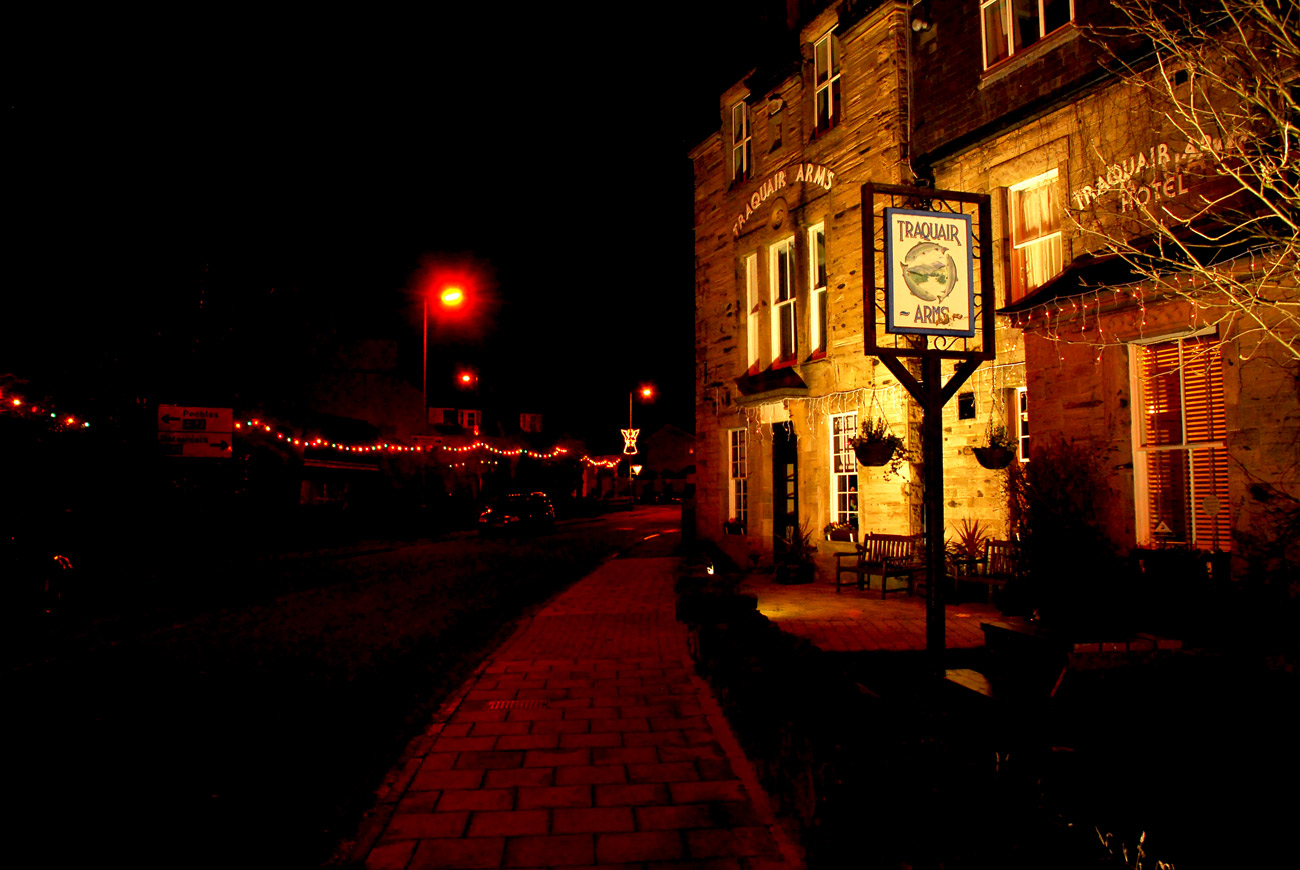
Traquair Arms Hotel, Innerleithen, taken in 2008

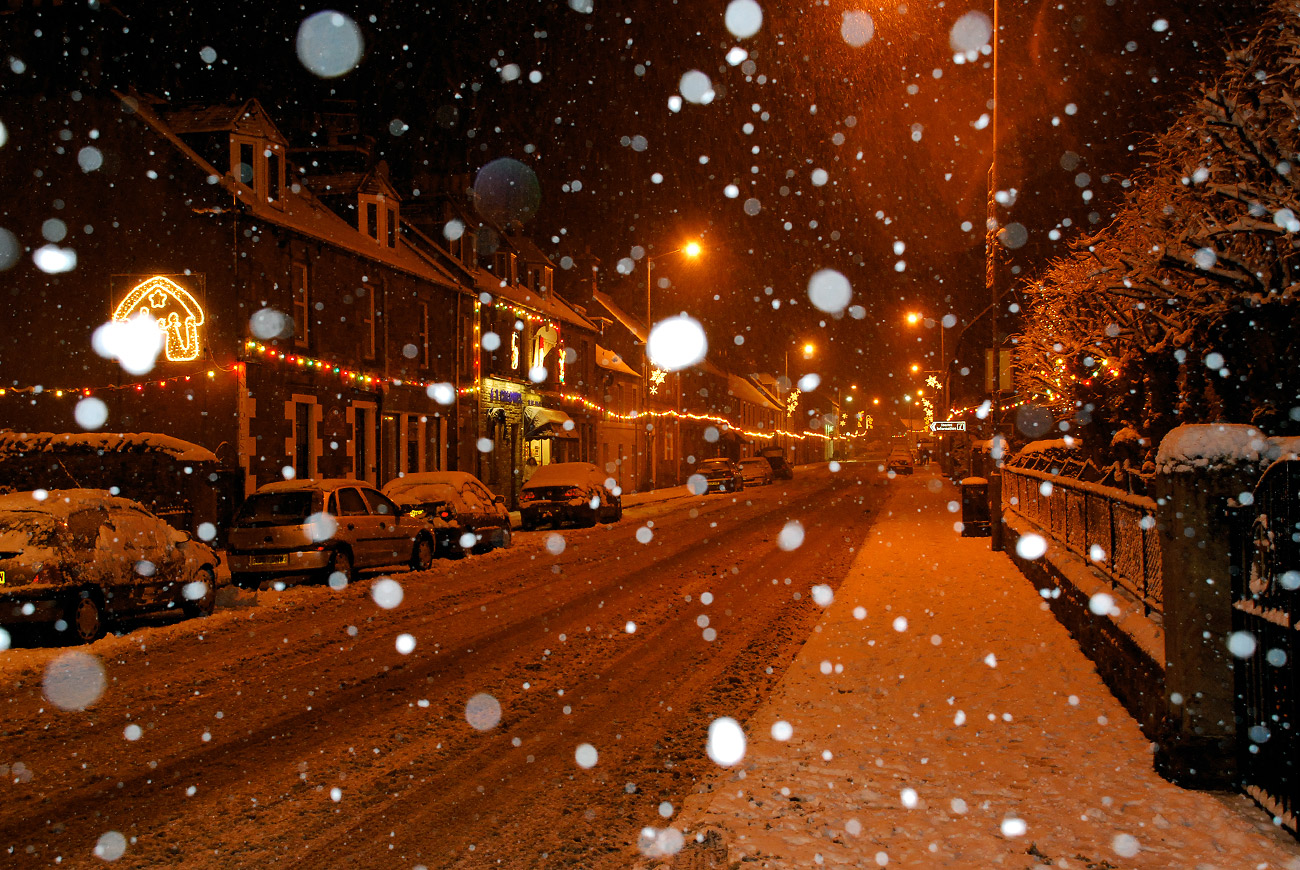
A snowy evening in Innerleithen, taken in 2008

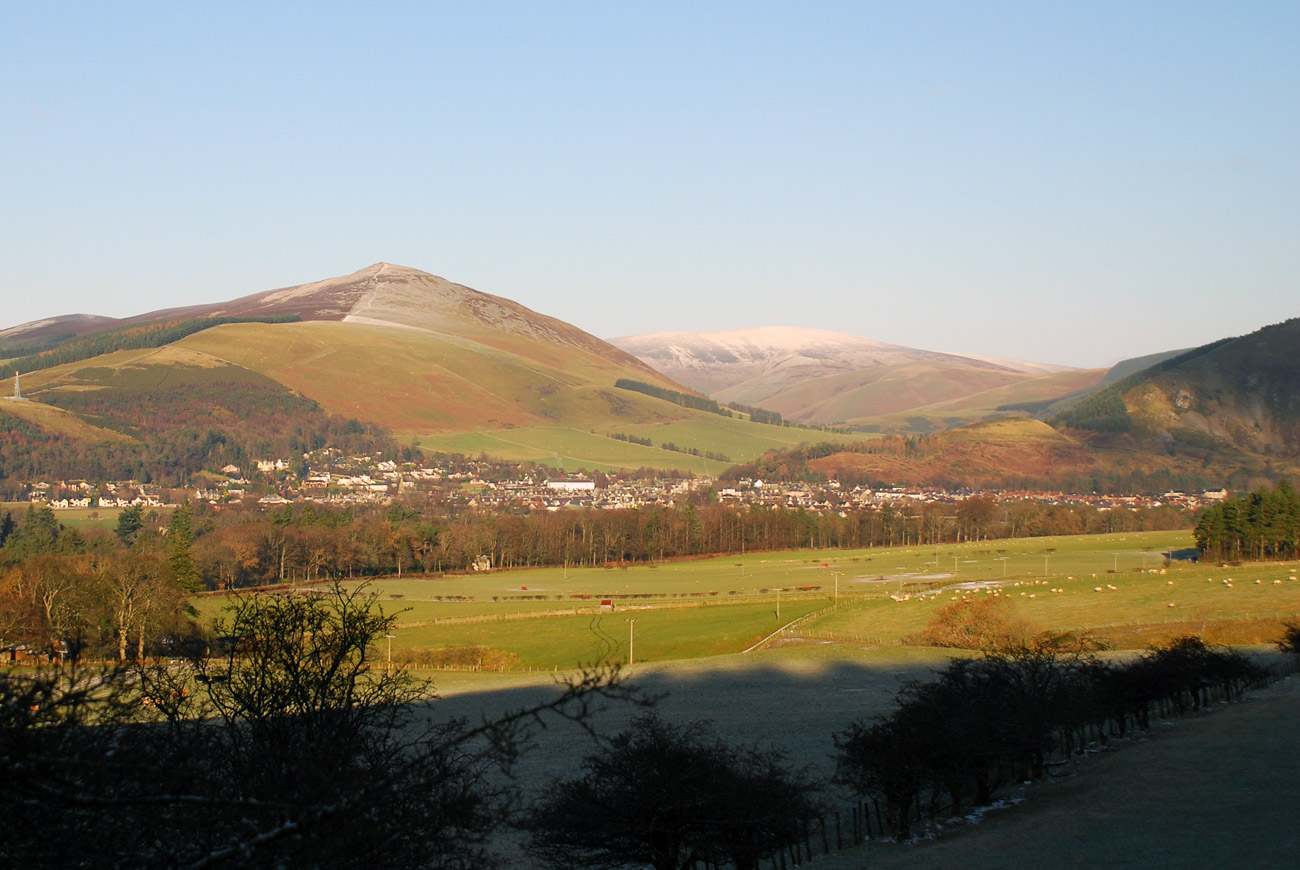
Innerleithen, taken from the nearby hills

== See also ==
- Auchentiber – the "Cleikum Inn"
- List of places in the Scottish Borders
- List of places in Scotland
