= Mire Loch =

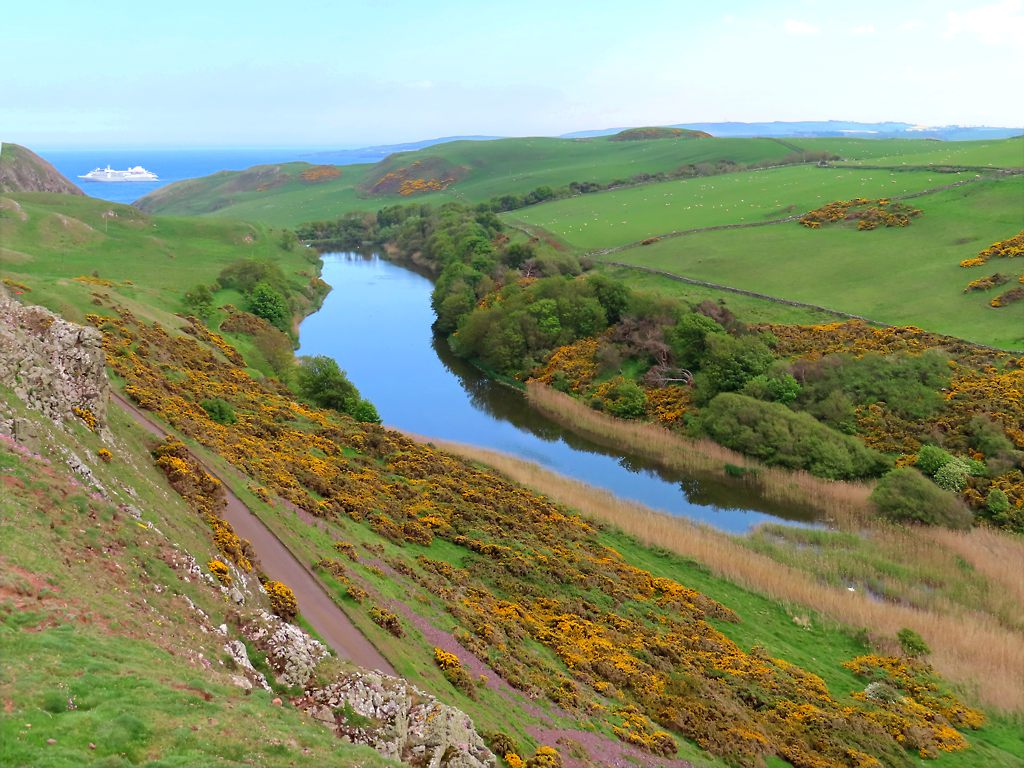
- Seen from the high ground to the NW

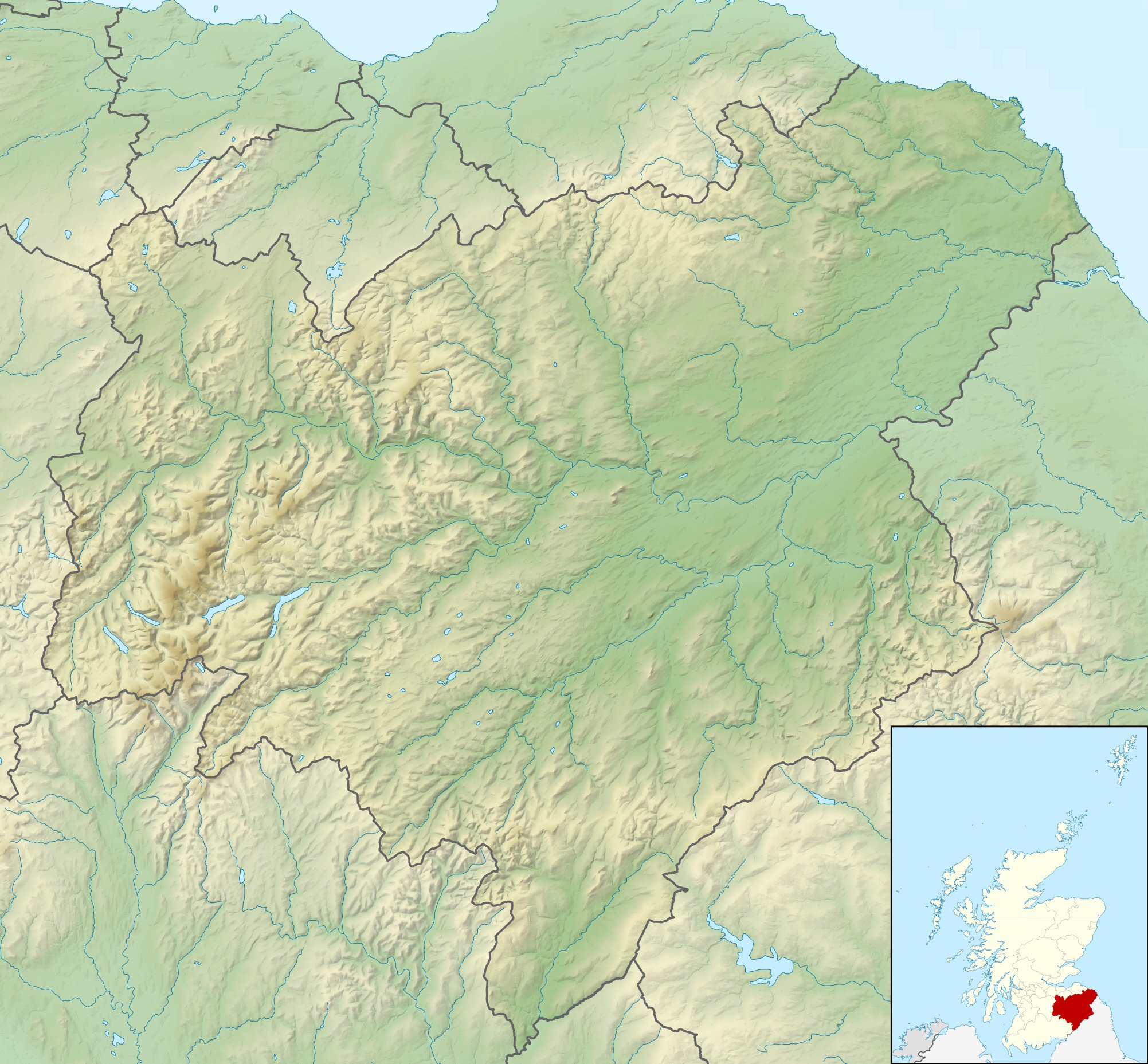
- Location within Scottish Borders
- Location: Scottish Borders, Scotland
- Coordinates: 55°54′40″N 2°08′28″W
- Type: freshwater loch, reservoir
- Basin countries: United Kingdom
- Max. length: 600 m (2,000 ft)
- Max. width: 50 m (160 ft)
- Surface area: 3 ha (7.4 acres)
- Surface elevation: 30 m (98 ft)

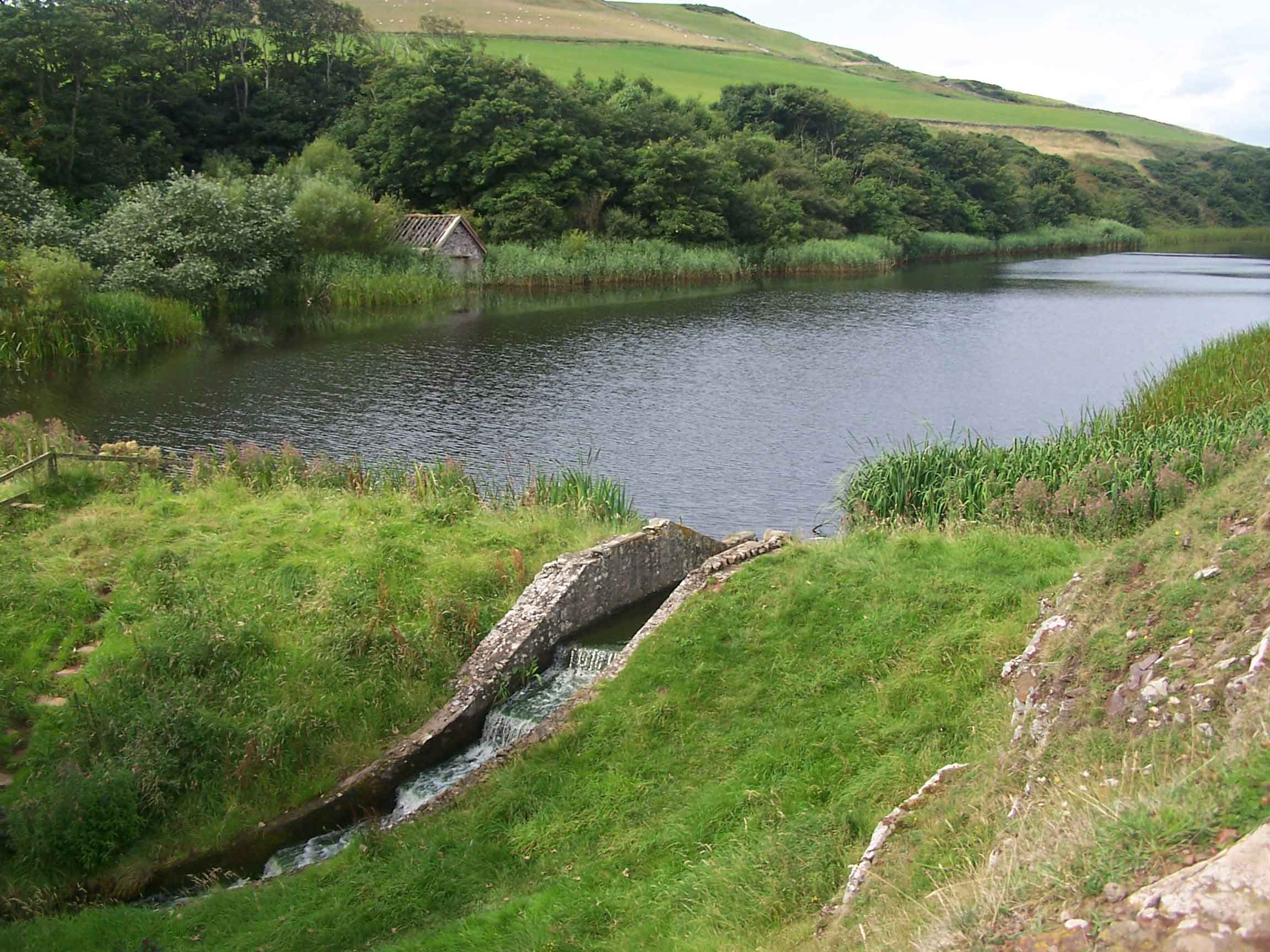
The outflow of Mire Loch with the ruined boat house in the background.

Mire Loch is a man made freshwater loch situated on St Abb's Head in the Scottish Borders, just over a kilometre NW of the village of St. Abbs at grid reference NT912687. The loch lies on land owned by the National Trust for Scotland (NTS) and is approximately 600 metres long by 50 metres at its widest point.

== History ==
Mire Loch was originally an area of marshy land within the St. Abbs Head Fault. The fault separated the hard volcanic rocks of St. Abbs Head from the softer sedimentary rocks of the mainland. The glacial channel which follows the fault is marked by a distinctive inland valley across the Head which was fed by rainwater from the high ground on both sides and formed a boggy area which drained into the sea.

Around the year 1900 it was decided to turn the boggy area into a recreation area. A dam was built to form a freshwater loch to be used for angling and waterfowl hunting, a nine-hole golf course was also constructed nearby. The use of the golf course was discontinued many years ago although there is some visible evidence of the old greens and tees. A boat house was built on the loch and this too has fallen into disrepair with most of the roof timbers now missing.

== Present day ==
Today Mire Loch is a valued part of St. Abbs Head National Nature Reserve providing a home for freshwater birds such as little grebe, reed bunting, heron, mute swan, moorhen and sedge warbler. The fringing vegetation which is composed mostly of high reeds provides shelter and food for nesting birds as well as for migrants in spring and autumn. In early summer hundreds of herring gulls and kittiwakes bathe in the loch. In recent years the NTS has planted almost 1000 trees around the loch in an effort to provide extra cover for migrant birds. Most of these trees have been planted on the SW shore in a plantation dedicated to a diver who died off St. Abbs Head in 1981.

Eels, perch and stickleback all live in the loch which is also a breeding site for frogs and toads. The loch has footpaths around its shores and walkers are encouraged by the NTS to include a circuit of the loch during their visit to St. Abb's Head although there is a warning that the paths can be quite muddy after rain. The loch has a stepped outflow which only runs for only several metres before disappearing down a man made drain, finding its way underground to the North Sea which is just 500 metres to the SE.
