= Saint Ronan's Well =

1824 novel by Walter Scott

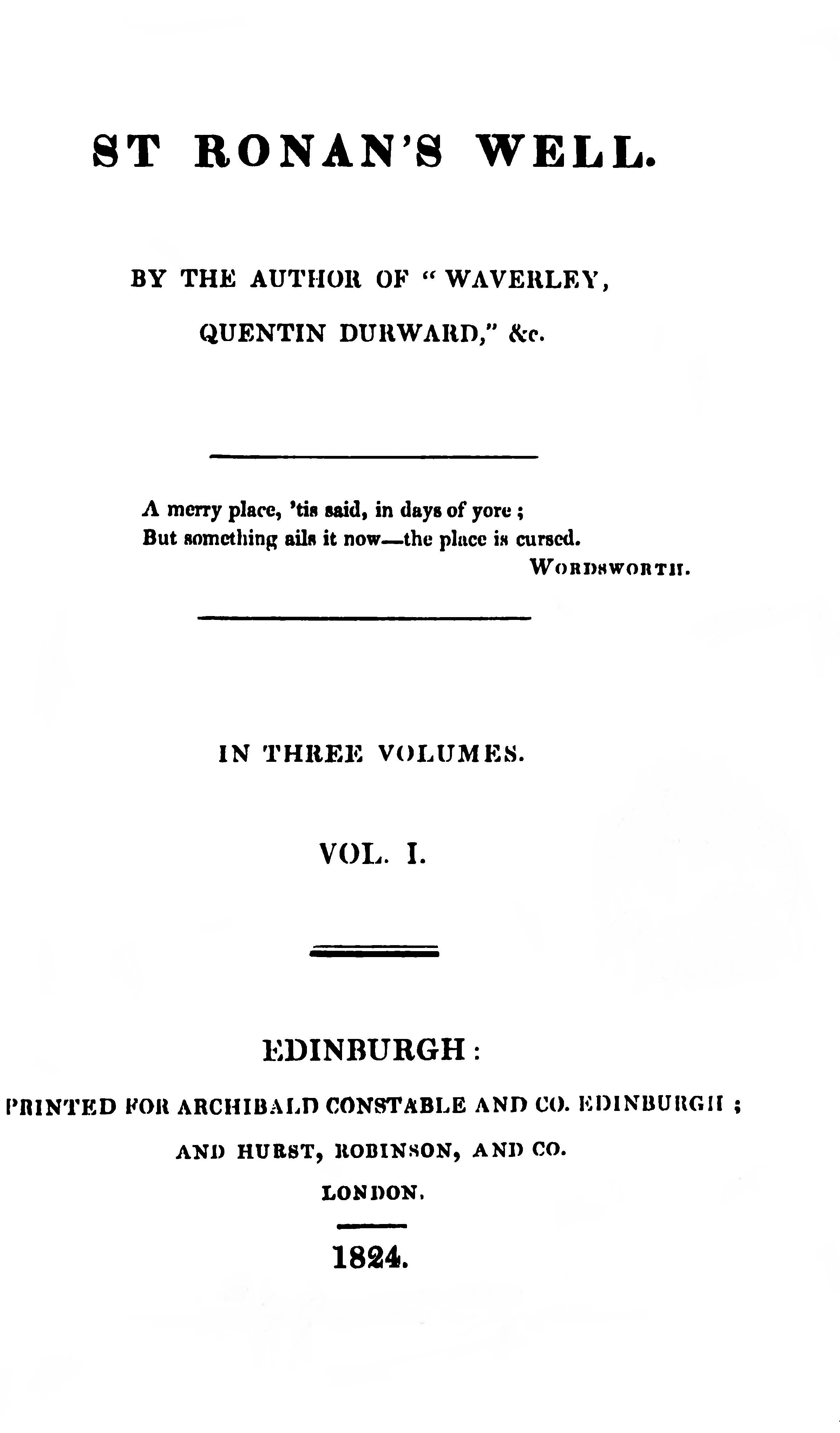
- First edition title page.
- Author: Sir Walter Scott
- Language: English and Lowland Scots
- Series: Waverley Novels
- Publisher: Archibald Constable and Co. (Edinburgh); Hurst, Robinson, and Co. (London)
- Publication date: 1823
- Publication place: Scotland
- Media type: Print
- Pages: 373 (Edinburgh Edition, 1995)
- Preceded by: Quentin Durward
- Followed by: Redgauntlet

Saint Ronan's Well is the 18th of the Waverley novels written by Sir Walter Scott (1771-1832). First published in 1824, it is set in a fashionable spa in the Scottish Borders, and is the only Scott novel with a 19th-century setting. The story concerns the rivalry of two men: Valentine Bulmer, the Earl of Etherington, and his half-brother Francis Tyrrel. Both wish to marry Miss Clara Mowbray, who is the sister of John, the laird of Saint Ronan’s.

== Composition and sources ==
The composition of Saint Ronan's Well was somewhat erratic. Scott began it immediately after completing Quentin Durward in early May 1823, and by the end of the month more than half of the first volume had been written. It is likely that he then slowed composition to avoid exhausting the market, and the volume was apparently not completed until late August or early September. Thereafter the pace quickened again, with the second volume finished and the third under way by mid-October, but then there came another slowing, and it is probable that it was into December before all was done. It seems likely that this second hold-up was occasioned by Scott's long resistance to the demand by James Ballantyne that the reference in the text to Clara's intercourse with Tyrell should be deleted: he eventually gave in, though signs of the original intention persist in the first edition.

Given its modern setting, it is not surprising that the sources of Saint Ronan's Well are predominantly literary rather than historical. It seems likely, though, that Clara's story was influenced by a protracted legal case involving a Border family, which ran from 1804 until 1820.

== Editions ==
The first edition was published in Edinburgh by Archibald Constable and Co. on 27 December 1823, and in London by Hurst, Robinson, and Co. two days later. The print run was 9800, of which Hurst, Robinson took 7000, and the price was one and a half guineas (£1 11s 6d or £1.57½). It is likely that Scott was responsible for some of the small changes to the text of the novel when it appeared in the 1827 Tales and Romances. During the latter part of 1830 he revised the text more extensively and provided an introduction and notes for the 'Magnum' edition, in which it appeared as Volumes 33 and 34 in February and March 1832.

The standard modern edition, by Mark Weinstein, was published as Volume 16 of the Edinburgh Edition of the Waverley Novels in 1995: this is based on the first edition with emendations mainly from the manuscript; the 'Magnum' material appears in Volume 25b (2012).

== Plot summary ==
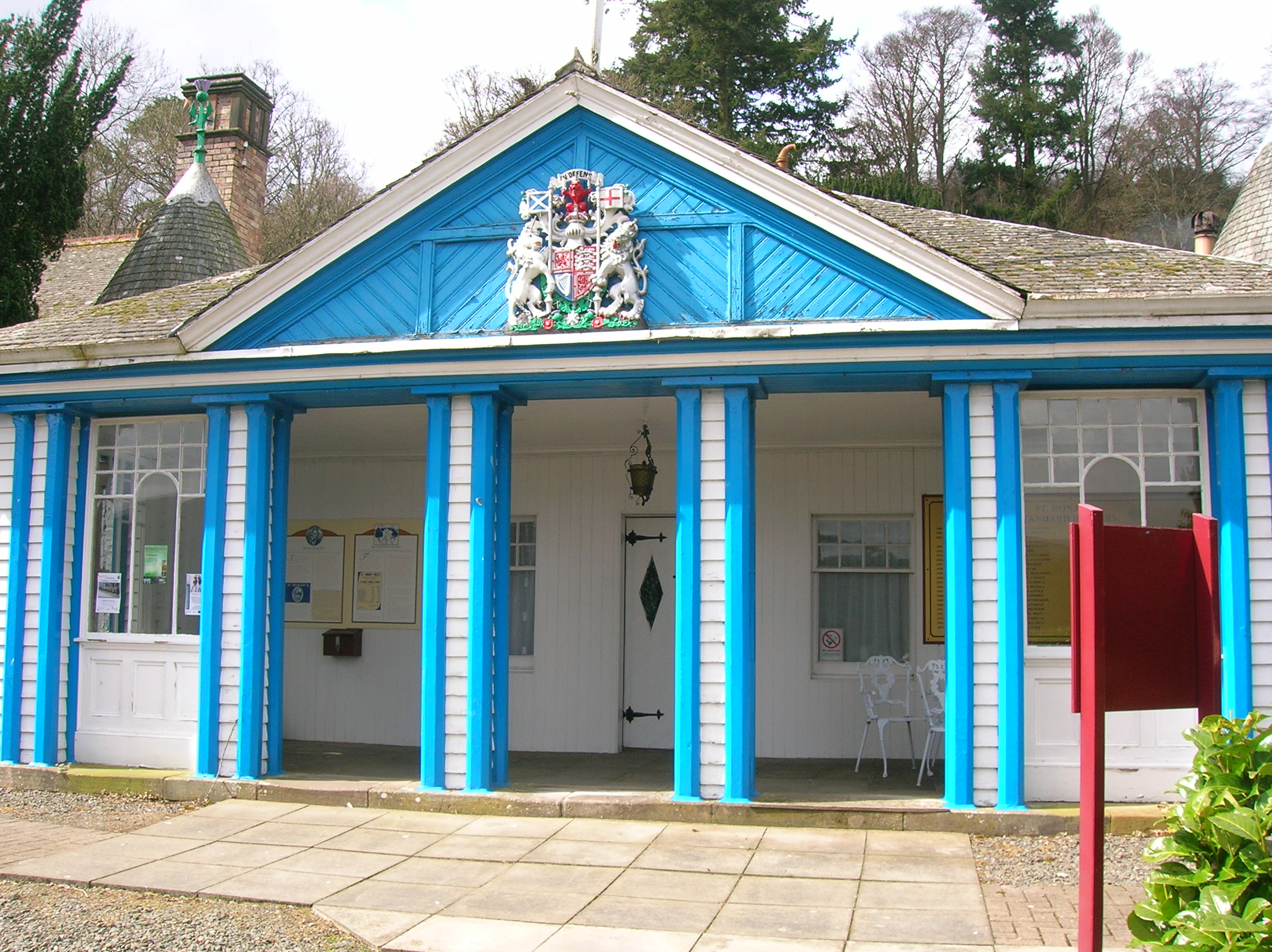
Saint Ronan's Wells, Innerleithen.

Valentine Bulmer and his half-brother Francis Tyrrel had been Mrs Dods' guests at Cleikum Inn when they were students from Edinburgh, and she gladly welcomed Francis when he arrived, some years afterwards, to stay at the inn again, to fish and sketch in the neighbourhood. A mineral spring had in the meantime been discovered at Saint Ronan’s, and he was invited by the fashionable visitors to dine with them at the Fox Hotel, where he quarrelled with an English baronet named Sir Bingo Binks. On his way back to the Cleikum, he met Clara Mowbray, to whom he had been secretly engaged during his former visit; he had been prevented from marrying her by the treachery of Bulmer, who had now succeeded to the earldom, and was expected at the spa. Tyrrel was visited by Captain MacTurk, and accepted a challenge from the baronet, but failed to keep his appointment, and was posted as an adventurer by the committee of management. He also disappeared from the inn, leading his hostess to consult Mr Bindloose, the sheriff's clerk, under the belief that he had been murdered. A Mr Touchwood came to change a bill, and talked of having been abroad for many years. He showed great interest in the affairs of the Mowbray family, and, having taken up his quarters at the Cleikum, made friends with Rev Mr Cargill, who had been disappointed in love, and startled him with a rumour that Clara was about to be married.

Soon after the earl's arrival, it was reported that he had been shot in the arm by a footpad; and, while his wound was healing, he spent his time gambling with John Mowbray, the young laird of St Ronan's, who had borrowed his sister Clara's money to try to improve his luck. Having allowed him to win a considerable sum, his lordship made proposals for Clara's hand, explaining that his grand-uncle had disinherited his only son, and devised his estate to him, on condition that he chose as a wife a lady of the name of Mowbray. In a letter to his friend Jekyl, the earl confessed that he had been winged in a duel with Tyrrel, whom he met on his way to fight Sir Bingo, and that he had also wounded Tyrrel. A few days afterwards the company at the Well assembled at Shaw's Castle to take part in a play, and Mr Touchwood persuaded Rev Mr Cargill to accompany him. While they were walking in the grounds the minister reminded Clara of a secret in his keeping, which made it impossible for her to marry. He also encountered the earl, and, believing him to be Bulmer, attempted to warn him.

The next morning, as John Mowbray was endeavouring to induce Clara to consent to the marriage, he received an anonymous communication that the earl was an impostor; and, in an interview with him, she rejected his suit with loathing and scorn. His lordship then wrote to Jekyl, telling him the circumstances under which, when he was only sixteen, he had arranged with Mr Cargill for a secret marriage between her and Tyrrel; but, learning subsequently the contents of his uncle's will, had incurred their lifelong hatred by impersonating his brother at the ceremony. Tyrrel, who after the duel had gone to a nearby village to recover from his wound, reappeared just in time to rescue Mr Touchwood from drowning; and, at an interview with Jekyl, who undertook to clear his character, offered to forgo his claim to the earldom, of which he had proof, if his brother would leave Clara alone. The earl sneered at the proposal, and, as he was forming fresh schemes for attaining his end, he discovered that Hannah Irwin, Clara's former companion, was dying at St Ronan's, and anxious to confess her share in the secret marriage. Solmes, the earl's valet, was instructed to carry her off, while his master got the brother into his power by ruining him at play, and then promised to cancel the debt if Clara consented to acknowledge him as her husband within four-and-twenty hours.

Mowbray believed he had prevailed with his sister, when Mr Touchwood unexpectedly arrived, and announced himself as Scrogie, the disinherited son, who by bribing Solmes, and in other ways, had learnt everyone's secrets, and was ready with his fortune to arrange all their difficulties. However, Clara had escaped from her room during the night, and, after appearing at the manse to forgive her cousin, who had been confided to Mr Cargill's care, had made her way to the Cleikum, where, in a seeming trance, she had a final interview with Tyrrel, and died soon afterwards from congestion of the brain. Mowbray, meanwhile, in his search for her, encountered the earl and his companions engaged in a shooting match, and killed him in a duel arranged on the spot by Captain MacTurk, with whom he fled to the Continent to escape imprisonment. Mr Touchwood had consequently to seek some other outlet for his wealth, and the Etherington estates were never claimed by the rightful heir, who determined to pass the remainder of his life in a Moravian mission.

== Characters ==
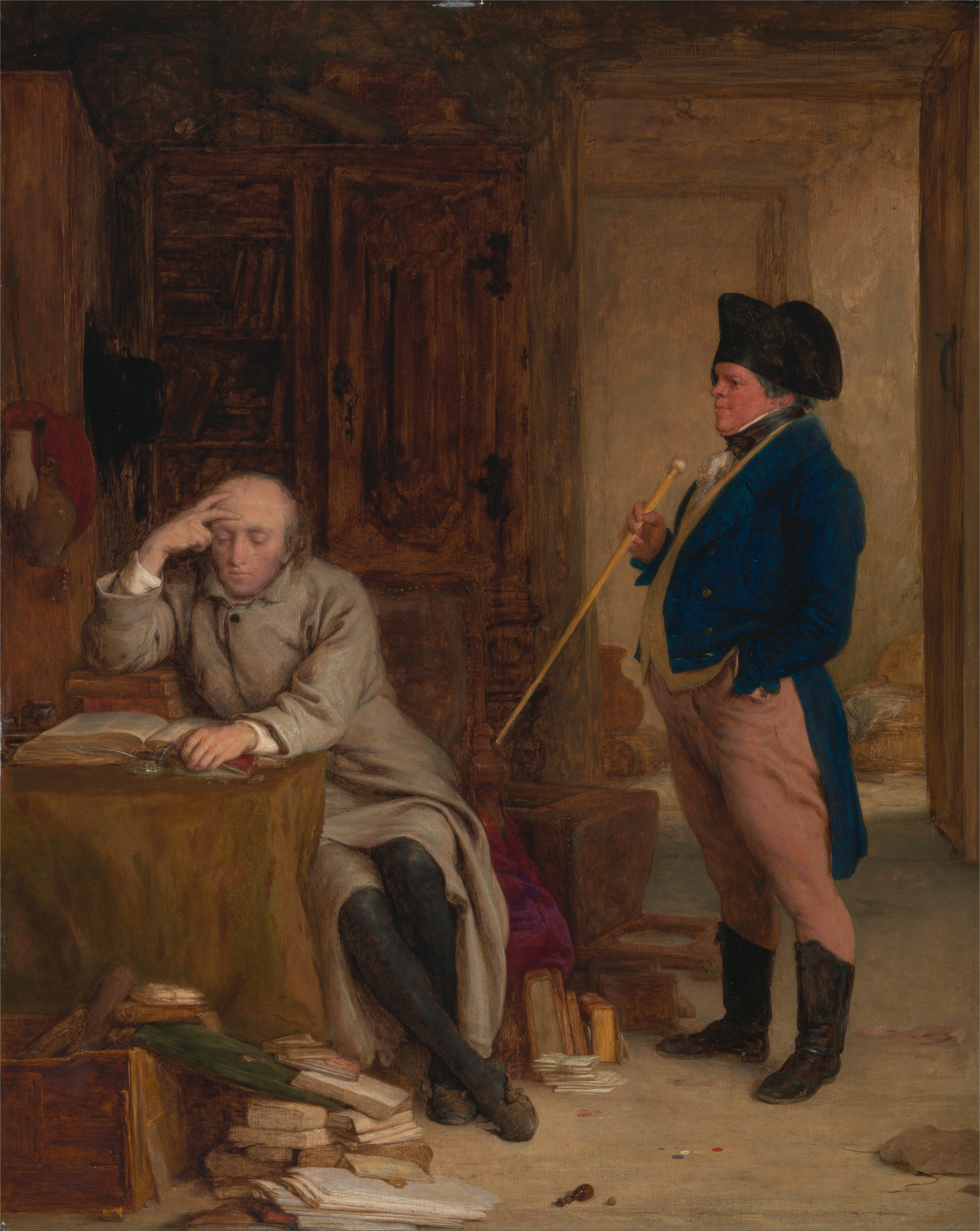
Cargill and Touchwood by William Mulready, 1831

Principal characters in bold

- **Meg Dods**, hostess of the Cleikum Inn
- **Valentine Bulmer**, afterwards Earl of Etherington
- **Francis Tyrrel**, his half-brother
- Captain Jekyl, the earl's friend
- Solmes, the earl's valet
- Mr Bindloose, sheriff's clerk and banker
- **John Mowbray** of Shaw's castle, laird of St Ronan's
- **Clara Mowbray**, his sister
- Hannah Irwin, their cousin
- Nelly Trotter, a fishwoman
- Lady Penelope Penfeather
- Mrs Margaret Blower, a widow
- Miss Maria Digges
- **Sir Bingo Binks**, an English baronet
- Lady Binks, his wife
- Managing committee at St Ronan's spa
  - Dr Quackleben
  - Philip Winterblossom
  - Saunders Micklewhame (Meikleham in some editions)
  - Captain Hector MacTurk
  - Rev. Simon Chatterley
  - Michael Meredith
- **Peregrine (Scrogie) Touchwood**
- **Rev. Josiah Cargill**, minister of St Ronan's

== Chapter summary ==
Volume One

Ch. 1 An old-world landlady: Meg Dods maintains an inn [the Cleikum] in the declined Aulton of Saint Ronan's with a limited set of regular patrons.

Ch. 2 The guest: Francis Tyrrel, who had spent time at Saint Ronan's in his youth, returns and is updated by Meg about the fashionable new development at the neighbouring Well.

Ch. 3 Administration: Tyrrel settles down into a sketching routine, and Meg praises his work to her gossip Nelly Trotter. The narrator provides an outline of the Well management committee members.

Ch. 4 The invitation: The committee agree to invite Tyrrel to the Well, resulting in a set of three cards from different factions.

Ch. 5 Epistolary eloquence: Tyrrel replies to the invitations and is the subject of wild speculation about misanthropy. When he arrives he is found unexpectedly sociable.

Ch. 6 Table-talk: The narrator sketches the characters of Lady Penelope and Lady Binks. Conversation at dinner centres on the whimsical Clara Mowbray's absence from the table and on Tyrrel's sketching, Francis rejecting Lady Penelope's suggested patronage.

Ch. 7 The tea-table: Presiding at after-dinner tea, Lady Penelope badmouths Tyrrel. Dr Quackleben ministers to Mrs Blower, while Lady Penelope and others discuss the relationship of the two. Clara enters, displaying febrile high spirits.

Ch. 8 After dinner: Tyrrel quarrels with Binks before leaving to meet Clara at the Buckstane. MacTurk encourages Binks to take the quarrel further, and the company discuss Clara's inviting them to lunch at Shaws-Castle.

Ch. 9 The meeting: In a fraught meeting at the Buckstane, Tyrrel and Clara recall their past sinful and foolish relationship. On his return to the Cleikum Inn, Tyrrel is rebuked by Meg for going to the Well.

Ch. 10 Resources: Mowbray makes heavy weather of preparations for the lunch at Shaws-Castle. Consulting with Micklewhame, he decides to ask Clara to sell stocks to provide him with cash to gamble with when Etherington arrives.

Ch. 11 Fraternal love: Clara readily agrees to lend her brother the money, but she is worried by his disposition to engage in quarrels.

Ch. 12 The challenge: MacTurk persuades Binks to allow him to carry a challenge to Tyrrel, and does so.

Ch. 13 Disappointment: With Binks, Winterblossom, and Quackleben, MacTurk makes arrangements for the duel, but Tyrrel fails to turn up and they produce a statement calling for his ostracism.

Volume Two

Ch. 1 (14) The consultation: Meg tells Bindloose, in his Marchthorn office, that she fears Tyrrel has been murdered.

Ch. 2 (15) A praiser of past times: Peregrine Touchwood arrives at Bindloose's office, expresses his disapproval of developments in Scotland during his time abroad, and transfers his custom from the Well to the Cleikum Inn.

Ch. 3 (16) The clergyman: Fussy and bored, Touchwood asks Meg about the local minister, Josiah Cargill. The narrator sketches Cargill's history and character.

Ch. 4 (17) The acquaintance: Touchstone visits Cargill and invites him to dinner, where they bond and Touchstone persuades the minister to attend a masquerade at Shaws-Castle, replacing the planned lunch. Cargill is startled when Meg says it is believed at the Well that Clara intends to marry.

Ch. 5 (18) Fortune's frolics: Mowbray repeatedly wins when gambling at picquet with Etherington. He instructs Micklewhame to order a shawl for Clara from Edinburgh. After deliberately losing a large sum, Etherington informs Mowbray that a condition attached to his uncle's legacy means that he must marry Clara Mowbray, his uncle having taken against his own surname Scrogie and disinherited his son for insisting on retaining it. Reflecting favourably on the proposed match, Mowbray decides to postpone mentioning it to his sister till after the theatricals.

Ch. 6 (19) A letter: Writing to his friend Captain Jekyl, Etherington tells how when approaching the Well he had encountered his cousin [i.e. half-brother] Tyrrel on his way to the duel with Binks. Each accused the other of breaking an agreement to keep away from the Well; they duelled, and Tyrell was wounded. Etherington urges Jekyl to come to the Well, with Mrs Binks as an inducement.

Ch. 7 (20) Theatricals: The company present a set of tableaux of scenes from A Midsummer Night's Dream.

Ch. 8 (21) Perplexities: Cargill warns a lady wearing an Indian shawl, whom he takes to be Clara, against entering into a sinful marriage. Approaching Etherington, he recognises him as Valentine Bulmer, which the earl denies. Touchwood assures him of the earl's identity. Lady Penelope raises with Cargill the question of Clara's match, but he retreats in embarrassment.

Ch. 9 (22) Expostulation: Clara tells her brother she has given Lady Penelope the shawl he bought for her, which had originally been destined for her ladyship until Mowbray intervened to secure it. Lady Penelope determines to avenge herself on the Mowbrays. Etherington disappears, leading to general frustration.

Ch. 10 (23) The proposal: Mowbray receives a letter from Etherington saying he left the castle because he preferred to meet Clara one-to-one rather than in company. Clara agrees to see him, but only with the intention of rejecting him.

Ch. 11 (24) Private information: Mowbray receives an anonymous letter [from Tyrrel] warning him against Etherington. The earl persuades Clara not to refuse to see him again, threatening to kill Tyrrel otherwise.

Ch. 12 (25) Explanatory: Etherington tells Mowbray that Tyrrel is deranged and begins a letter to Jekyl recounting the story of his half-brother and himself.

Ch. 13 (26) Letter continued: Etherington concludes his story with an account of his impersonating his half-brother in a secret marriage with Clara, having discovered about his uncle's condition requiring marriage to a Mowbray, following which they had agreed to stay away from Clara and each other.

Volume Three

Ch. 1 (27) The reply: In his reply Jekyl counsels caution, but in response Etherington rejects his advice.

Ch. 2 (28) The fright: Touchwood introduces improvements in the Aulton. He is rescued from a ditch by Tyrrel, whom he had assisted financially in Smyrna.

Ch. 3 (29) Mediation: Tyrrel shows Jekyl copies of documents proving his parents' marriage, and Jekyl proposes that Etherington and Clara should marry openly after concluding a contract of separation. Tyrrel presents as a counter-proposal that he leave Etherington in undisturbed possession of the disputed estate provided he agrees to have no further communication with Clara. He writes off for the original documents.

Ch. 4 (30) Intrusion: Touchwood quizzes a reluctant Jekyl, obtaining his confirmation of the duel between Tyrrel and Etherington.

Ch. 5 (31) Discussion: Etherington discusses matters with Jekyl and instructs Solmes to intercept the documents at the post office. After investigating the workings of the office Etherington has an awkward encounter with his half-brother. He tells Jekyl he is determined to continue with his plan to marry Clara openly.

Ch. 6 (32) A death-bed: The Well is disappointed by the low-key behaviour of the half-brothers. Touchwood is now uncommunicative to Jekyl. Lady Penelope and Etherington hear the ailing Hannah Irwin confess that she was complicit in Clara's ruin.

Ch. 7 (33) Disappointment: Etherington finds that the documents intercepted by Solmes are only another set of copies. He instructs Solmes to arrange for Hannah's removal from the locality. Mowbray loses deeply to Etherington and prepares to speak to his sister.

Ch. 8 (34) A tea-party: At the Well Mowbray learns that Lady Penelope has said Clara is no better than she ought to be. Rejecting Touchwood's attempts to calm him, he rides off furiously.

Ch. 9 (35) Debate: Mowbray ascertains Clara's guilt in a violent interview, and she agrees to marry Etherington.

Ch. 10 (36) A relative: Touchwood tells Mowbray that he (Touchwood) is the disinherited Scrogie of Ch. 18 and informs him of Tyrrel's legitimacy, and of Clara's marriage to the intrusive Etherington, Solmes being his informant. Mowbray agrees to be guided by him.

Ch. 11 (37) The wanderer: Clara is found to be missing from Shaws-Castle, and her brother goes in search of her.

Ch. 12 (38) The catastrophe: Touchwood has arranged for the dying Hannah to be brought to the manse by Solmes, where she confesses to Cargill her role in Clara's ruin and the secret marriage ceremony when Etherington had impersonated Tyrrel. Clara briefly appears and pardons her before proceeding to Tyrrel's room at the Cleikum Inn where she expires. Touchwood arrives to announce that Mowbray has killed Etherington in a duel.

Ch. 13 (39) Conclusion: The duel is described and the characters disposed of. Mowbray has the Well demolished.

== Reception ==
Two-thirds of the reviewers judged Saint Ronan's Well adversely, and only two or three were really enthusiastic. Scott's move to his own time was generally considered a mistake, resulting in a set of heavy caricatures of vulgar, commonplace characters. There was also distress at the needlessly tragic ending (at least in part the result of Scott's elimination of Clara's fall from virtue). The story was often found hackneyed, improbable, and ill-conducted. Several reviewers were disappointed when the title's suggestion of a medieval romance evaporated. But even the most severe critics mostly found at least traces of the author's characteristic virtues. Meg Dods and Touchwood attracted general praise, and in a number of reviews the major scene between Mowbray and his sister was singled out for commendation.

== Quote ==
"My gude name!—If onybody touched my gude name, I would neither fash counsel nor commissary—I wad be down amang them like a jer-faulcon amang a wheen wild geese, and the best amang them that dared to say onything of Meg Dods bye what was honest and civil, I wad sune see if her cockernonnie was made of her ain hair or other folks'."
