= Priorwood Garden =

Coordinates: 55.5983°N 2.7183°W

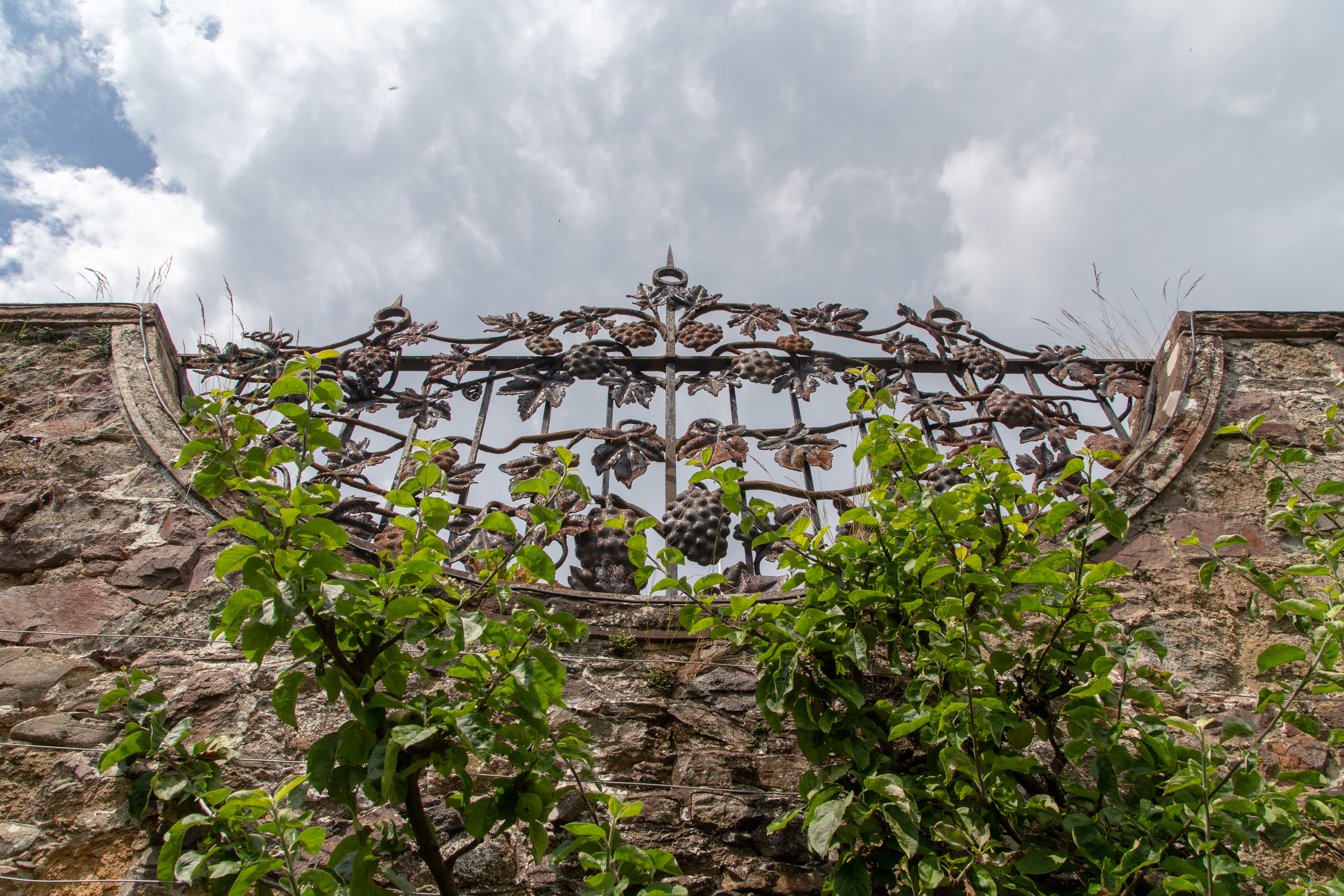
The walled garden is listed

Priorwood Garden is a garden in Melrose in the Scottish Borders area of Scotland. The garden contains an apple orchard of unusual apple trees. The flower garden is planted to supply the best samples for dry flower arrangements. It is administered by the National Trust for Scotland.

The National Trust for Scotland has further properties in the Scottish Borders including the nearby Harmony Garden.

== See also ==
- List of places in the Scottish Borders
- List of places in Scotland
