= St Abb's Head =

Rocky promontory and national nature reserve in Scottish Borders, Scotland

St Abb's Head National Nature Reserve
- IUCN category IV (habitat/species management area)
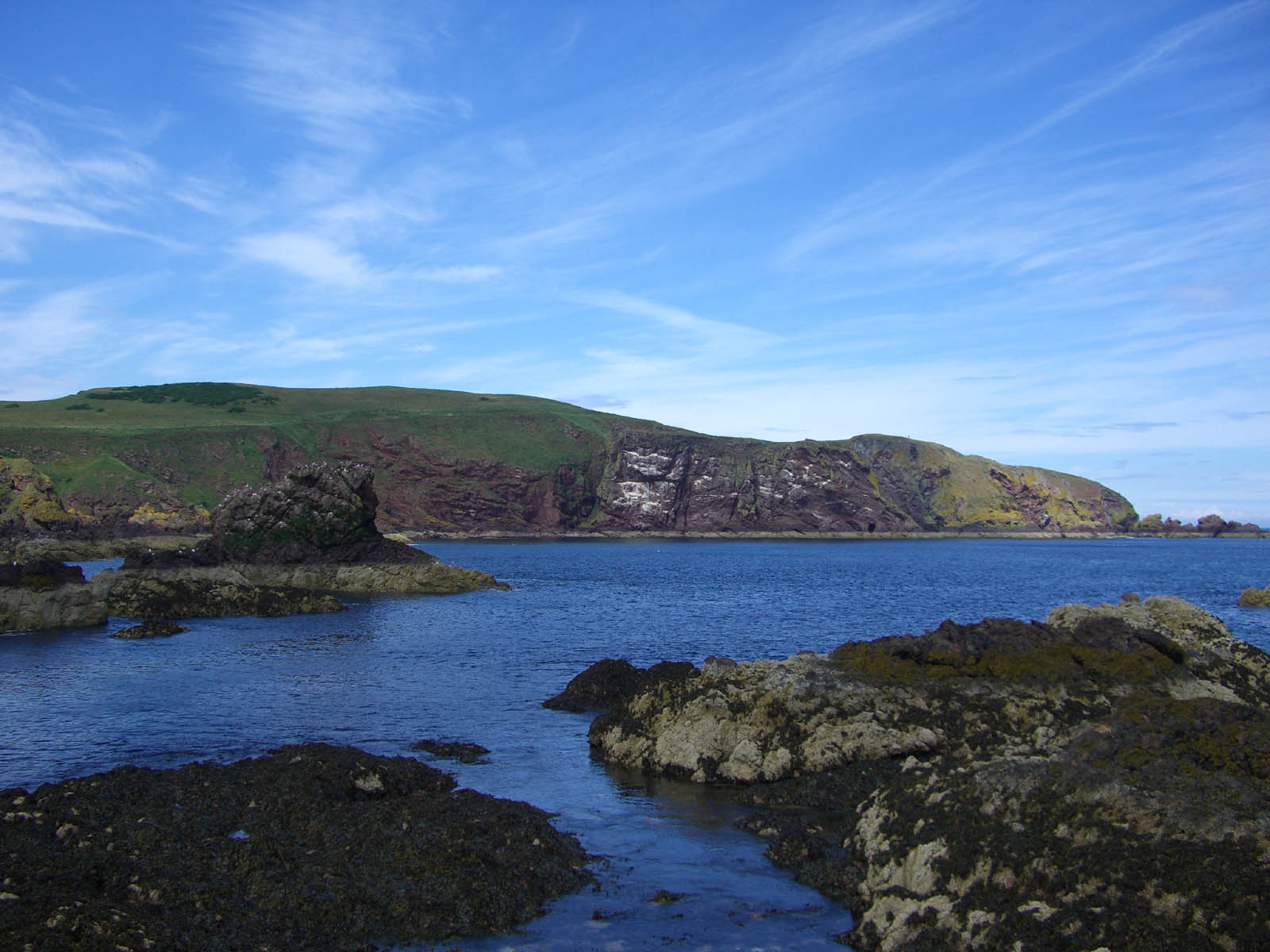
- St Abb's Head seen from the south near the village of St Abbs

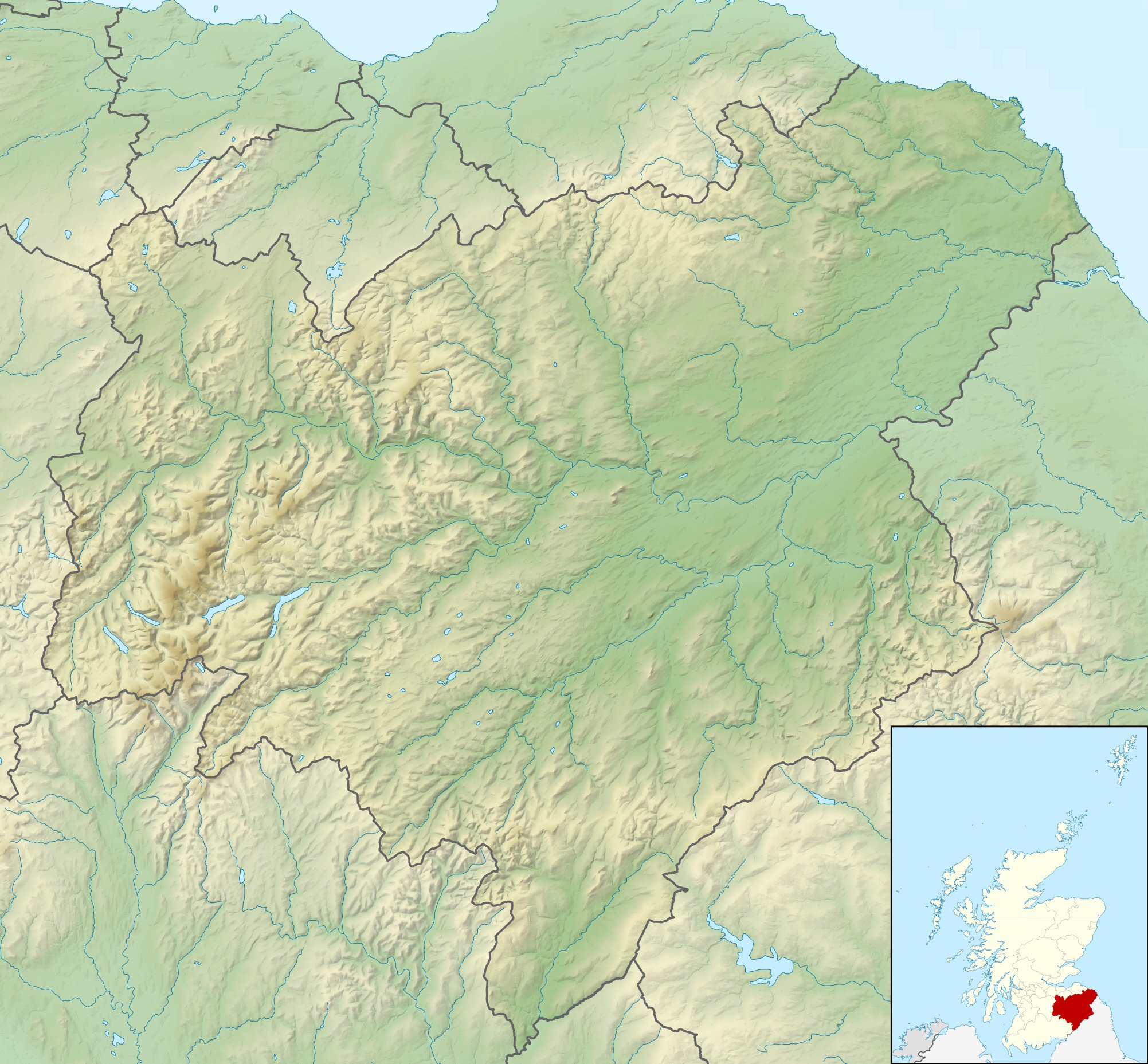
- Location within Scottish Borders Location within Scotland
- Location: Berwickshire, Scotland
- Coordinates: 55°54′57.9″N 2°08′19.0″W
- Area: 77.2 ha (191 acres)
- Designation: NatureScot
- Established: 1984
- Owner: National Trust for Scotland
- Website: St Abb's Head National Nature Reserve

St Abb's Head is a rocky promontory by the village of St Abbs in Berwickshire, Scotland, and a national nature reserve administered by the National Trust for Scotland. St Abb's Head Lighthouse was designed and built by the brothers David Stevenson and Thomas Stevenson and began service on 24 February 1862.

== Geology ==
The layered sedimentary rocks of greywacke and siltstone which lie to the north and south of the Head were laid down at the bottom of the sea between 460 and 410 million years ago. The Head itself is made from hard volcanic rock which formed as lava flowed from volcanoes around 400 million years ago. The different type of rocks accounts for the contrast in colour between the rocks of the Head and those of mainland cliffs. The softer sedimentary rocks have eroded over time, leaving behind the high headland made from the harder rock. However, even this tough volcanic rock has been affected by the actions of the sea, leaving steep gullies and sea stacks which are ideal for nesting seabirds. The harder rocks of the Head are separated from the sedimentary rock to the southwest by the northwest slanting St Abb's Head Fault, which is marked by a low lying valley which contains the man made Mire Loch and at times of higher sea level would have been flooded, cutting off the headland from the mainland.

== Flora and fauna ==
St Abb's Head is home to a 60,000 strong seabird colony. Guillemots and razorbills nest on the offshore stacks, with guillemots nesting together in tightly packed crowds whilst razorbills prefer to nest in single pairs or in smaller groups. Kittiwakes breed on the sheer cliff faces of St Abb's Head, building nests from grass and mud on narrow ledges, whilst fulmars prefer grass-covered ledges and crevices. Shags, herring gulls and puffins are also present. Although best known for its seabirds, the reserve also has flower rich grasslands and a freshwater loch. To preserve the marine habitat, the NTS in conjunction with the Scottish Wildlife Trust, the local fishing community and diving clubs, have set up a Voluntary Marine Reserve which stretches south down the coast to the town of Eyemouth.

The grazing on the Head is leased by the Trust to Northfield Farm which stands just to the south of the Head near St Abbs village. The grassland is surprisingly rich for a coastal situation, in some places it is possible to find over 20 different species of plant in one square metre. There are at least 10 different kinds of butterfly on the Head including the northern brown argus which is a nationally rare butterfly in the UK. The butterflies drink nectar from the flowers of the wild thyme and the caterpillars eat the leaves of rock rose, the areas in which these two plants grow are protected from sheep grazing by fencing. Just inland from the lighthouse is Mire Loch, a 600-metre-long (2,000 ft) artificially created lake.

== History ==
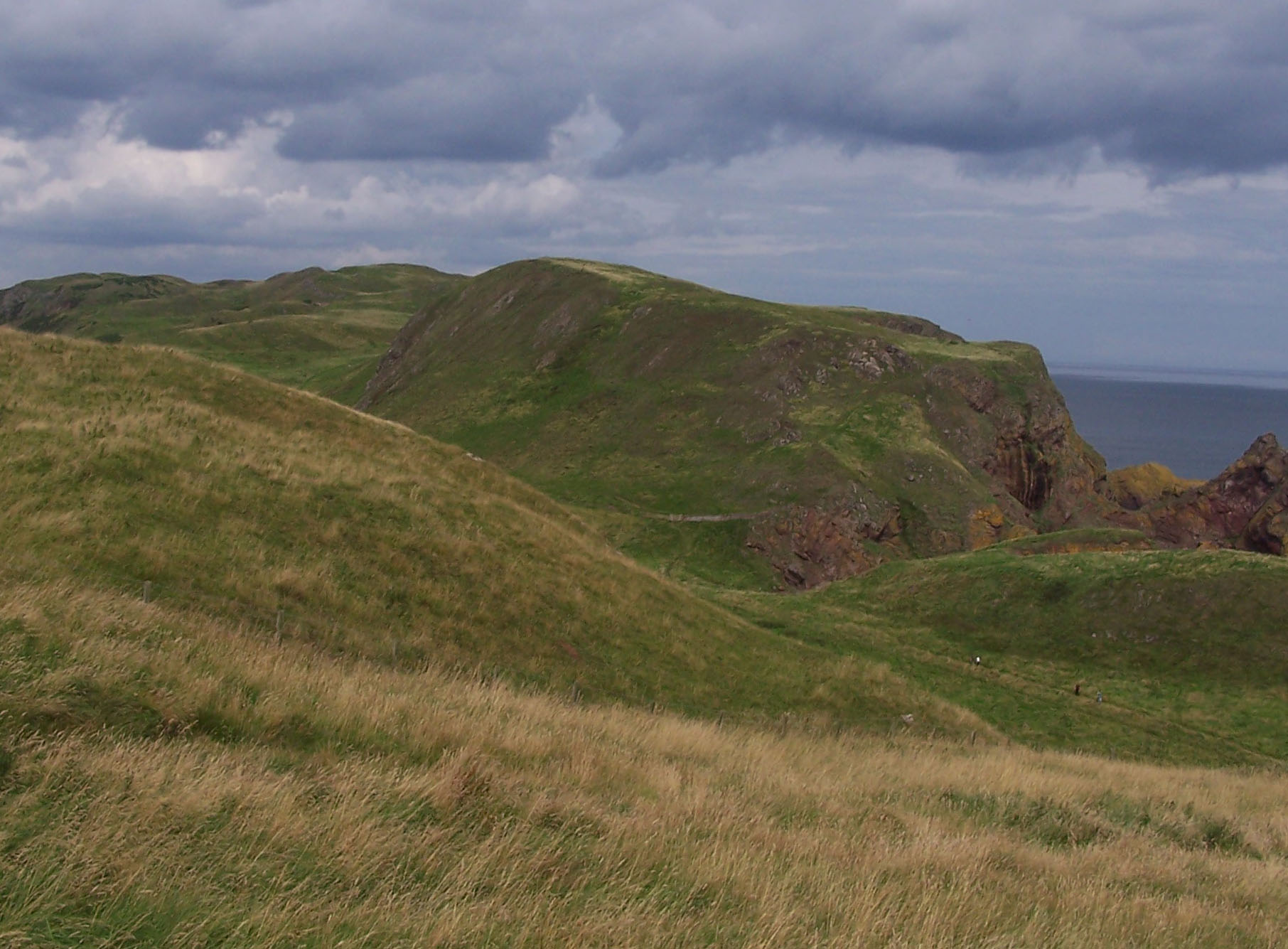
Kirk Hill (centre), the site of St. Æbbe's monastery, with the tip of the Head beyond.

Just 0.5 km to the SE of the lighthouse is Kirk Hill. On the summit of this hill are the remains of the 7th century monastery settlement of Saint Æbbe. About AD 643 Æbbe established the monastery on Kirk Hill within the remains of a 6th-century fort known as Urbs Coludi (Colud's Fort). Both monks and nuns lived at the monastery in basic beehive huts made from mud and branches. Æbbe remained as abbess until her death around 680, a few years later the monastery was accidentally burned down and was not replaced. The settlement was protected by a massive three-metre-high (9.8-foot) turf rampart on the landward side, the remains of this rampart can be seen as a low ridge around the rim of the hill. These are the only remnants of the 7th-century monastic settlement of Æbbe. However, there are faint outlines of buildings, field boundaries and a rectangular burial site dating from the 12th century. These are the scant traces of a Benedictine chapel established in 1188 and dedicated to Æbbe by monks from Coldingham Priory.

On the north side of the Head is Pettico Wick Bay this provides a natural trap for salmon as they swim down the coast. A fishing station was established here in 1880 and lasted until around 1950. A jetty was also built in the bay so supplies could be landed for the lighthouse.

A signal station was established on the cliffs before 1820 and the facilities were shared by Trinity House and Her Majesty's Coastguard. The Northern Lighthouse Board recommended the building of a lighthouse at St Abb's Head after the sinking of the "Martello" on Carr Rock in 1857. The lighthouse was designed and built by the brothers David Stevenson and Thomas Stevenson and assisted navigation before and after sight of the Bell Rock and Isle of May lights disappeared from view. The light began service on 24 February 1862 and initially used oil to generate its light, it was converted to incandescent power in 1906 and to electricity in 1966 and finally automated in 1993. Before automation the lighthouse was staffed by three full-time keepers whose duties included keeping detailed weather records.

Despite the lighthouse, several ships have been lost on the jagged coastline off St Abbs. The cargo ship MV Nyon ran aground on 16 November 1958 in dense fog. The crew was rescued ship was beached on rocks but the stern was successfully separated and salvaged, eventually towed to the Netherlands where it was rebuilt with a new front section. The Nyon's original bow section remained at St Abbs until it was destroyed by wave action.

Royal Navy Scout Cruiser HMS Pathfinder, the first vessel to be destroyed by a self-propelled torpedo, sunk off St Abbs Head on 5 September 1914 with the loss of 259 lives, having been attacked by German U-boat, SM U-21. The explosion that destroyed the ship was witnessed by author Aldous Huxley who was staying in St Abbs at the time.

== Visitor facilities ==
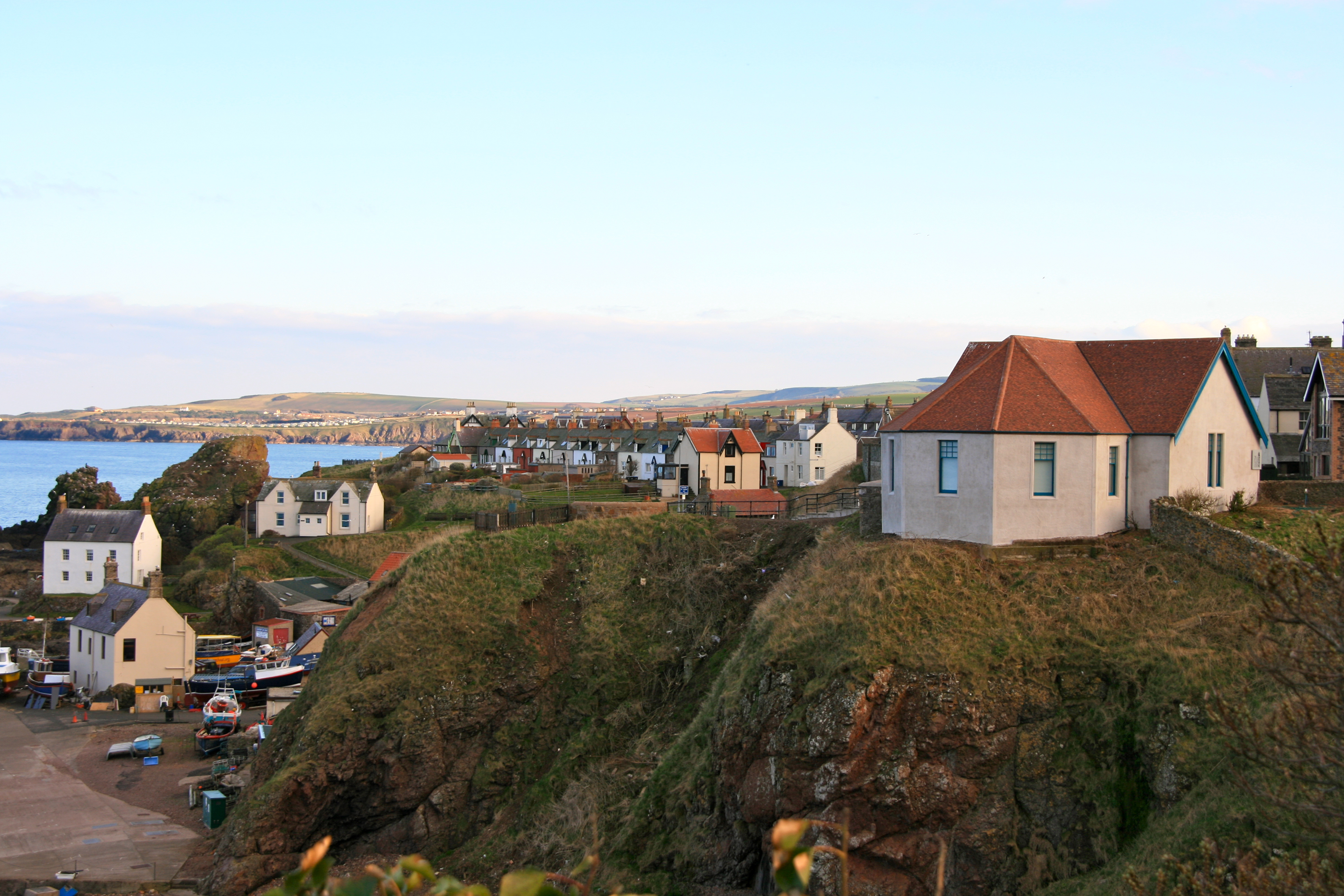
St Abbs Visitor Centre

The NTS has an information point for St Abb's Head located at Northfield Farm which has an exhibition with information about the Head, coffee shop, art gallery and textile shop. There are maps describing the walk to the Head and as well as Ranger led guided walks.

March 2011 saw the opening of the latest addition to the many attractions of St Abbs in the form of the new St Abbs Visitor Centre. This facility is located in St Abbs old village hall, located at the cliff edge. Built as a resource for both visitors and locals, the centre offers free admission, interactive exhibits, library area, web access, photographs and historical artefacts. It provides visitors with information on the history of the village, the geology and also the local flora and fauna they are may encounter. The position of the building offers a 180-degree view from St Abb's Head all the way to the harbour and beyond. The centre is run by an independent Scottish charity.

== Conservation designations ==
Land around St Abb's Head was designated as a national nature reserve in 1984. The reserve is managed by the National Trust for Scotland in co-operation with NatureScot. The first part was purchased in 1980, with the Lumsdaine coastal strip being donated by Pearl Assurance Company Ltd. in 1984. Blackpotts grazings were purchased in 1994.

As well as being an NNR, St Abb's Head forms part of several other national and international conservation designations as an important site for wildlife:

- The NNR is classified as a Category IV protected area by the International Union for Conservation of Nature.
- St Abb's Head lies at the southern end of the St Abb's Head to Fast Castle Site of Special Scientific Interest (SSSI), which covers a stretch of coastline running north as far as Fast Castle Head.
- The intertidal areas form part of a separate SSSI, the Berwickshire Coast (Intertidal) SSSI, which extends as far south as the English border.
- The NNR lies within the St Abb's Head to Fast Castle Special Protection Area (SPA).
- The St Abb's Head to Fast Castle coastline is also designated as a Special Area of Conservation (SAC), and the seas offshore are part of a further SAC, the Berwickshire and North Northumberland Coast SAC, which crosses the border to extend into England.

== See also ==
- St Abbs
- St Æbbe
- Coldingham Loch
- Coldingham Priory
- Coldingham

== Gallery ==
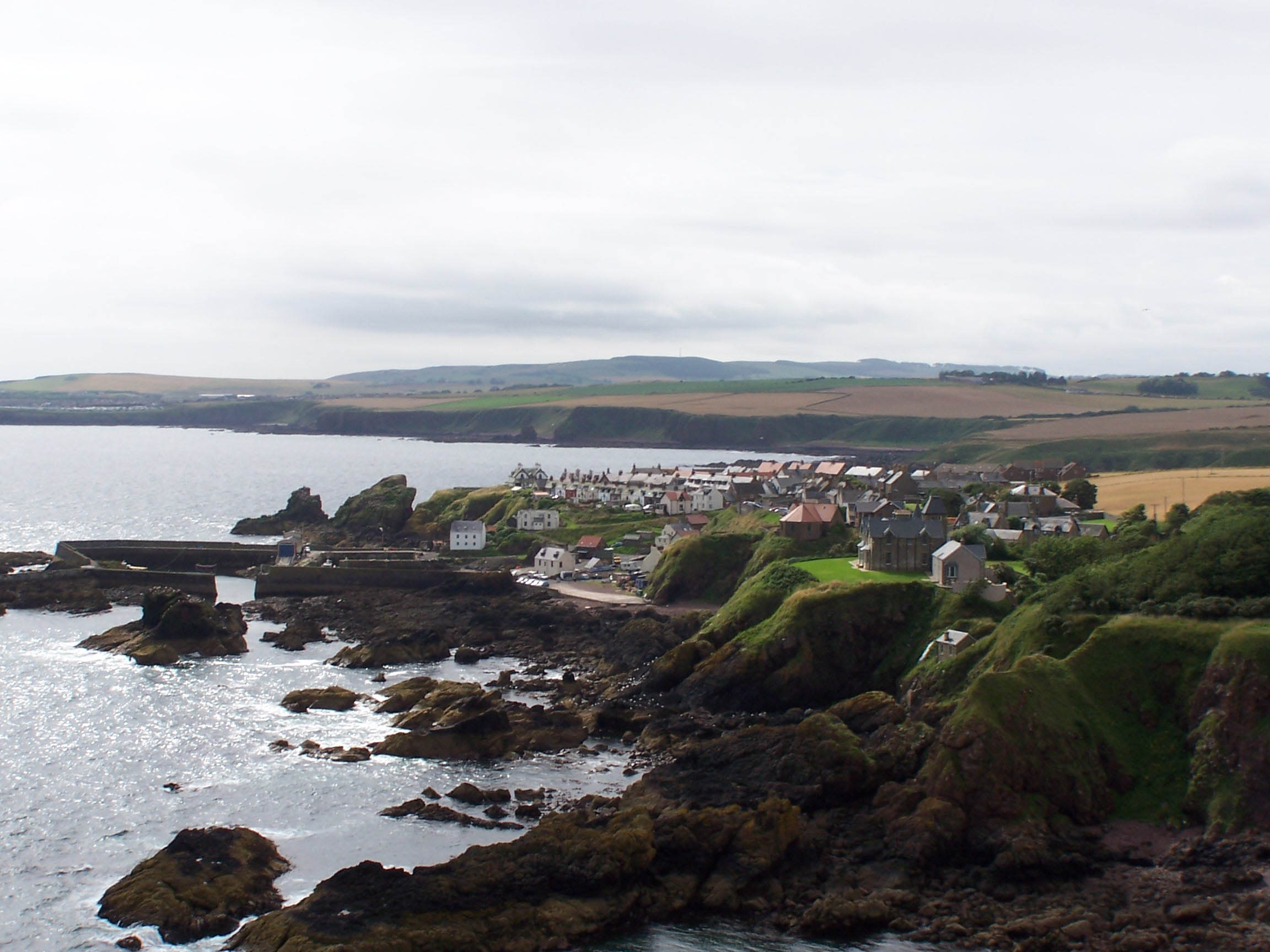
The village of St Abbs seen from the southern side of St Abb's Head.

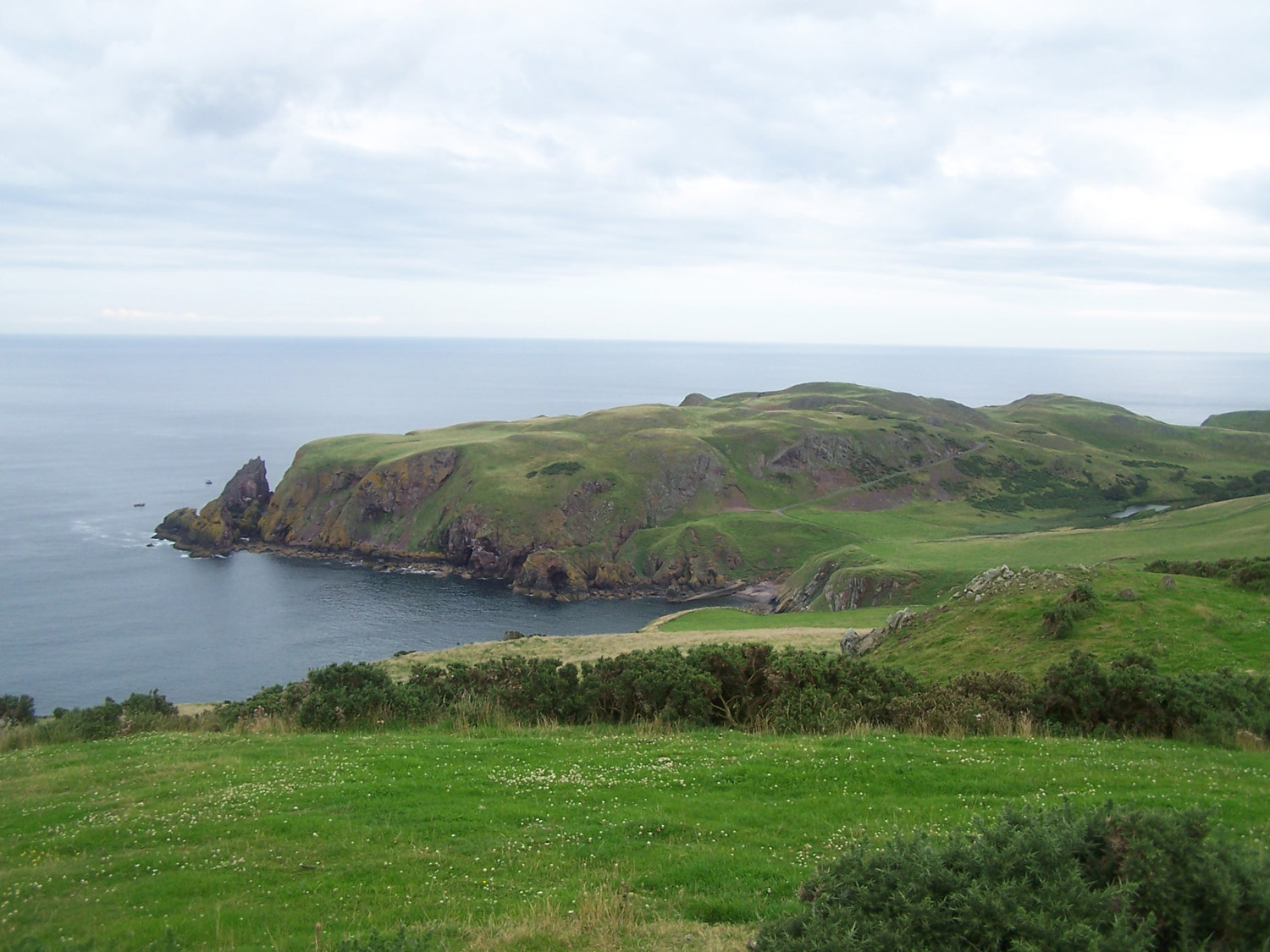
The head seen from the NW, from the cliffs above Pettico Wick Bay.
