= Charter for Trees, Woods and People =

UK charter for forrest recognition

- Created: 2016–2017
- Date effective: 6 November 2017
- Location: Lincoln Castle, Lincoln, England
- Author(s): Woodland Trust and a coalition of over 70 UK organisations
- Purpose: To recognise, celebrate, and protect the value of trees and woods in the United Kingdom.

The Charter for Trees, Woods and People, also known as the Tree Charter, is a document launched in 2017 to state the guiding principles for protecting and celebrating trees and woodland in the United Kingdom. The charter was created by the Woodland Trust in partnership with a coalition of more than 70 conservation and environmental organisations.

The charter was launched on 6 November 2017 at Lincoln Castle to mark the 800th anniversary of the 1217 Charter of the Forest. It is not a legally binding document but serves as a set of guiding principles to influence policy and public attitudes towards trees.

== Background ==
=== Historical context ===
The modern Tree Charter was inspired by the Charter of the Forest, which was first signed on 6 November 1217 as a sister charter to Magna Carta. Signed by King Henry III, the Charter of the Forest re-established the rights of free men to access and use the royal forests, which had been a critical resource for firewood, building materials, and grazing land.

=== Modern impetus ===
In October 2010, the UK government introduced the Public Bodies Bill, which included provisions that would have allowed the Secretary of State to sell public forestry land in England. Following a public outcry and campaigns by environmental groups, the government abandoned the plans. The Woodland Trust cited the strong public response as evidence of the deep connection people have with the nation's forests, which helped prompt the call for a new charter. The government's subsequent Independent Panel on Forestry recommended in its 2012 report the creation of a "charter for the English Public Forest Estate" to specify its public benefit mission.

== Development and launch ==
The campaign for a new Charter for Trees, Woods and People was initiated in January 2016. To shape its content, the Woodland Trust and its partners embarked on a public consultation, collecting more than 60,000 "tree stories" from people across the UK about the role trees played in their lives. These stories, along with expert consultations, were used to draft the charter's ten guiding principles.

The final charter was launched on 6 November 2017, the 800th anniversary of the Charter of the Forest, at an event in Lincoln Castle, where an original copy of the 1217 charter is held.

== Charter principles ==
The content of the Tree Charter is based on ten guiding principles, which were formulated from the public stories and expert consultations. The principles are:

1. Sustain landscapes rich in wildlife
2. Plant for the future
3. Celebrate the power of trees to inspire
4. Grow forests of opportunity and innovation
5. Protect irreplaceable trees and woods
6. Plan greener local landscapes
7. Recover health, hope and wellbeing with the help of trees
8. Make trees accessible to all
9. Strengthen our landscapes with trees
10. Enhance forests through skilful management

The charter is intended to be used as a tool to hold politicians and organisations accountable and to guide decision-making regarding trees and woodland.

== Signatories and supporters ==
The charter was created by a coalition of over 70 organisations, with other bodies and individuals joining as signatories. Key partner organisations include:

- Action for Conservation
- Ahmadiyya Muslim Youth Association UK
- Ancient Tree Forum
- Arboricultural Association
- Bat Conservation Trust
- Black Environment Network
- Borders Forest Trust
- British Association for Shooting and Conservation
- Butterfly Conservation
- Campaign for National Parks (CNP)
- Campaign to Protect Rural England (CPRE)
- Caring For God's Acre
- Centre for Sustainable Healthcare
- Church of England
- CIEEM (Chartered Institute of Ecology and Environmental Management)
- City of Trees
- Climate Coalition
- Coigach Assynt Trust
- Common Ground
- Confor
- Confederation of Timber Industries (CTI)
- Continuous Cover Forestry Group
- Country Land and Business Association (CLA)
- Forest School Association (FSA)
- Froglife
- FSC-UK (Forest Stewardship Council)
- Game and Wildlife Conservation Trust
- Going Wild
- GreenBlue Urban
- GroundWork Gallery
- Grown in Britain
- Institute of Chartered Foresters (ICF)
- John Muir Trust
- Legal Sustainability Alliance (LSA)
- Llais y Goedwig
- MADE (Muslim Action for Development and Environment)
- Mersey Forest
- National Association of Local Councils
- National Forest
- National Trust
- National Union of Students (NUS)
- New Forest National Park Authority
- National Farmers' Union (NFU)
- Northern Ireland Council for Voluntary Action
- Northern Ireland Environment Link
- Order of Bards, Ovates and Druids
- Plantlife
- Reforesting Scotland
- RFS (Royal Forestry Society)
- RHS (Royal Horticultural Society)
- Royal Botanic Garden Edinburgh
- RSPB (Royal Society for the Protection of Birds)
- RSPB Wales
- Small Woods Association
- Soil Association
- SWOG (Small Woodland Owners' Group)
- Sylva Foundation
- TDAG (Trees and Design Action Group)
- The British Beekeepers Association
- The British Druid Order
- The Conservation Foundation
- The Conservation Volunteers (TCV)
- The Consulting Arborist Society (CAS)
- The Land Trust
- The Landscape Institute
- The Orchard Project
- The Pagan Federation
- The Sherwood Forest Trust
- The Tree Council
- The Wildlife Trusts
- The Windsor Estate
- Timber Trade Federation (TTF)
- Tir Coed
- Trees for Cities
- Wild Network
- Wildlife & Countryside Link
- Woodland Heritage
- Woodland Trust
- Woodlands.co.uk
- WWF-UK

== See also ==
- Charter of the Forest
- Deforestation in the United Kingdom
- Forestry in the United Kingdom
