= List of forests in the United Kingdom =

This is a list of some of the forests in the United Kingdom. Care should be taken to distinguish extensive wooded areas from royal forests which may never have been particularly wooded within historical times.

== England ==

=== North ===
Cheshire

- Delamere Forest
- Mersey Forest
- Macclesfield Forest

Cumbria

- Grizedale Forest
- Whinfell Forest
- Whinlatter Forest
- Ennerdale Forest
- Blengdale Forest
- Dodd Wood
- Parkgate and Irton Forest

County Durham

- Hamsterley Forest

Lancashire

- Gisburn Forest

Northumberland

- Kielder Forest

Yorkshire

- Dalby Forest
- Wykeham Forest

=== Midlands ===
- Forest of Mercia
- National Forest

West Midlands County

- Black Country Urban Forest

Shropshire

- Morfe Forest
- Mortimer Forest

Staffordshire

- Cannock Chase
- Kinver Forest

Warwickshire

- Forest of Arden
- Heart of England Forest

Worcestershire

- Wyre Forest (part in Shropshire)

Derbyshire

- Darwin Forest

Nottinghamshire

- Greenwood Forest
- Sherwood Forest

Leicestershire

- Charnwood Forest

Lincolnshire

- List of Forests and Woodland in Lincolnshire

Rutland

- Leighfield Forest

Northamptonshire

- Rockingham Forest
- Salcey Forest

=== East ===
Essex

- Epping Forest
- Hainault Forest

Bedfordshire

- Forest of Marston Vale

Hertfordshire

- Heartwood Forest

Norfolk

- Thetford Forest
- Horsford Woods (Horsford Forest)

Suffolk

- Rendlesham Forest

=== South east ===
Buckinghamshire

- Burnham Beeches
- Whiteleaf Hill

Hampshire

- Alice Holt Forest
- New Forest

Isle of Wight

- Brighstone Forest
- Parkhurst Forest

Kent

- Bedgebury Forest

Oxfordshire

- Wychwood

Surrey

- Chiddingfold Forest
- Swinley Forest
- Winterfold Forest

Sussex

- Ashdown Forest
- Dallington Forest
- Friston Forest
- St Leonard's Forest
- Worth Forest

=== South west ===
Somerset

- the former Royal Forest of North Petherton
- Selwood Forest
- Forest of Avon

Gloucestershire

- Royal Forest of Dean
- Forest of Avon

Wiltshire

- Savernake Forest

Devon

- Ashclyst Forest
- Bellever Forest
- Decoy Forest
- Fernworthy Forest
- Haldon Forest

Dorset

- Wareham Forest
- Moors Valley Country Park and Forest

== Scotland ==
Angus

- Backmuir Wood

Argyll and Bute

- Argyll Forest Park

Dumfries and Galloway

- Forest of Ae
- Carsphairn Forest
- Corriedoo Forest
- Dalbeattie Forest
- Dundeugh Forest
- Fleet Forest
- Laurieston Forest
- Mabie Forest
- Penninghame Forest
- Eskrigg Nature Reserve

Strathspey & Badenoch

- Abernethy Forest
- Glenmore Forest
- Rothiemurchus Forest

Fife

- Tentsmuir Forest

Scottish Borders

- Craik Forest
- Ettrick Forest
- Wauchope Forest

South Ayrshire

- Arecleoch Forest
- Carrick Forest
- Changue Forest
- Tairlaw Forest

Stirling

- Queen Elizabeth Forest Park
- Rowardennan Forest
- Strathyre Forest

== Wales ==
Anglesey (Ynys Môn)

- Newborough Forest

Carmarthenshire (Sir Gaerfyrddin)

- Brechfa Forest

Ceredigion

- Penglais Nature Park

Conwy

- Gwydir Forest

Conwy/Denbighshire

- Clocaenog Forest

Denbighshire

- Llandegla Forest

Gwynedd

- Coed-y-Brenin

Monmouthshire

- Wentwood

Neath Port Talbot

- Afan Forest Park

Powys

- Clun Forest
- Hafren Forest

== Northern Ireland ==
- Ballypatrick Forest
- Belvoir Forest
- Castlewellan Forest Park
- Drum Manor Forest Park
- Ely Lodge Forest
- Florence Court Forest Park
- Glenariff Forest Park
- Gortin Glen Forest Park
- Gosford Forest Park
- Lough Navar Forest Drive
- Rostrevor Forest
- Tollymore Forest Park

== Classification ==
- Ancient woodland
  - List of ancient woods in England
- Community forests in England
- Royal forest
- List of forests managed by the Forestry Commission

== See also ==
- Forestry in the United Kingdom
- Crown Estate
- English Lowlands beech forests
- Forestry Commission
