= English Lowlands beech forests =

Ecoregion in the British Isles

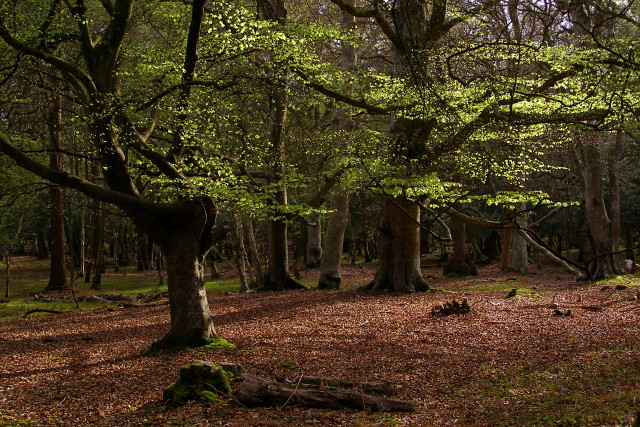
- Mallard Wood, New Forest

- Location of the English Lowlands beech forests

Ecology
- Realm: Palearctic
- Biome: temperate broadleaf and mixed forests
- Borders: Celtic broadleaf forests

Geography
- Area: 45,600 km^{2} (17,600 sq mi)
- Country: United Kingdom

Conservation
- Conservation status: critical/endangered

The English Lowlands beech forests is a terrestrial ecoregion in the United Kingdom, as defined by the World Wide Fund for Nature (WWF) and the European Environment Agency (EEA). It covers 45,600 km^{2} (17,600 sq mi) of Southern England, approximately as far as the border with Devon and South Wales in the west, into the Severn valley in the north-west, into the East Midlands in the north, and up to the border of Norfolk in the north-east. The WWF code for this ecoregion is PA0421.

== Ecoregional context ==
To the north, west and south-west lies the similar Celtic broadleaf forests ecoregion, which covers most of the rest of the British Isles. In addition, two further ecoregions are located in the south-western and north-western edges of Ireland, and the north-western fringes of Scotland (North Atlantic moist mixed forests), and beyond the Scottish Highland Boundary Fault (Caledonian conifer forests). The whole of this Atlantic archipelago is thus considered as originally (or in some sense ideally) forested, with only the far mountainous north being primarily coniferous. Across the English Channel lies the Atlantic mixed forests ecoregion in northern France and the Low Countries.

The difference between the English lowlands beech forests and the Celtic broadleaf forests lies in the fact that south-eastern England is comparatively drier and warmer in climate, and lower-lying in terms of topography. Geologically, something of the distinction can be found in the dominance of the Southern England Chalk Formation in this ecoregion, and the Tees-Exe line, which divides the island of Great Britain into a sedimentary south-east, and a metamorphic and igneous north-west. However, the WWF division was preceded by that of the Hungarian biologist Miklos Udvardy, who had considered the greater part of the British Isles as just one biogeographic province in the Palearctic Realm, which he termed British Islands.

== Characteristics ==
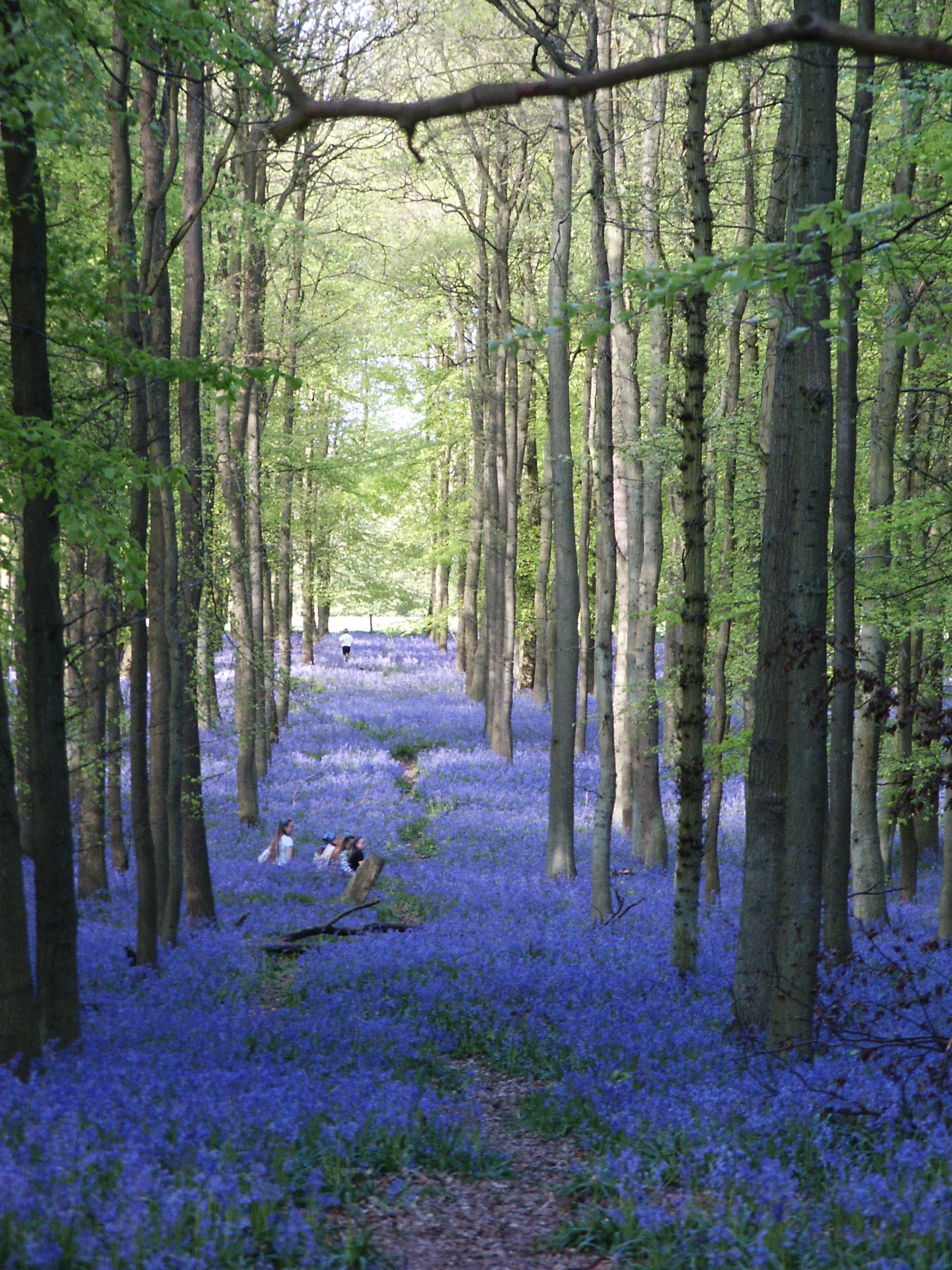
A bluebell wood near Ivinghoe Beacon in early May

Historically, much of this lowland and submontane region was covered with high-canopy forests dominated by European beech (Fagus sylvatica), but also including other species of tree, including oak, ash, rowan and yew. In summer, the forests are generally cool and dark, because the beech produces a dense canopy, and thus restricts the growth of other species of tree and wild flowers. In the spring, however, thick carpets of bluebells (Hyacinthoides non-scripta) can be seen, flowering before the beech leafs out and shades the forest floor.

The National Vegetation Classification (NVC) plant communities associated with beech forests (together with their occurrence ratios in England as a whole) are:

- W12 Fagus sylvatica – Mercurialis perennis (dog's mercury) woodland (base-rich soils) – c. 40%
- W14 Fagus sylvatica – Rubus fruticosus (bramble) woodland (mesotrophic soils) – c. 45%
- W15 Fagus sylvatica – Deschampsia flexuosa (wavy hair-grass) woodland (acidic soils) – c. 15%

River systems, the most significant of which is the Thames, were historically host to lower-canopy riverine forests dominated by black alder, and this can still be encountered occasionally today. Also included in this ecoregion are the distinctive ecosystems associated with the rivers themselves, as well as their flood-meadows and estuaries. The soils are largely based on limestone, and the climate is temperate with steady amounts of rainfall. Temperatures can fall below freezing in the winter.

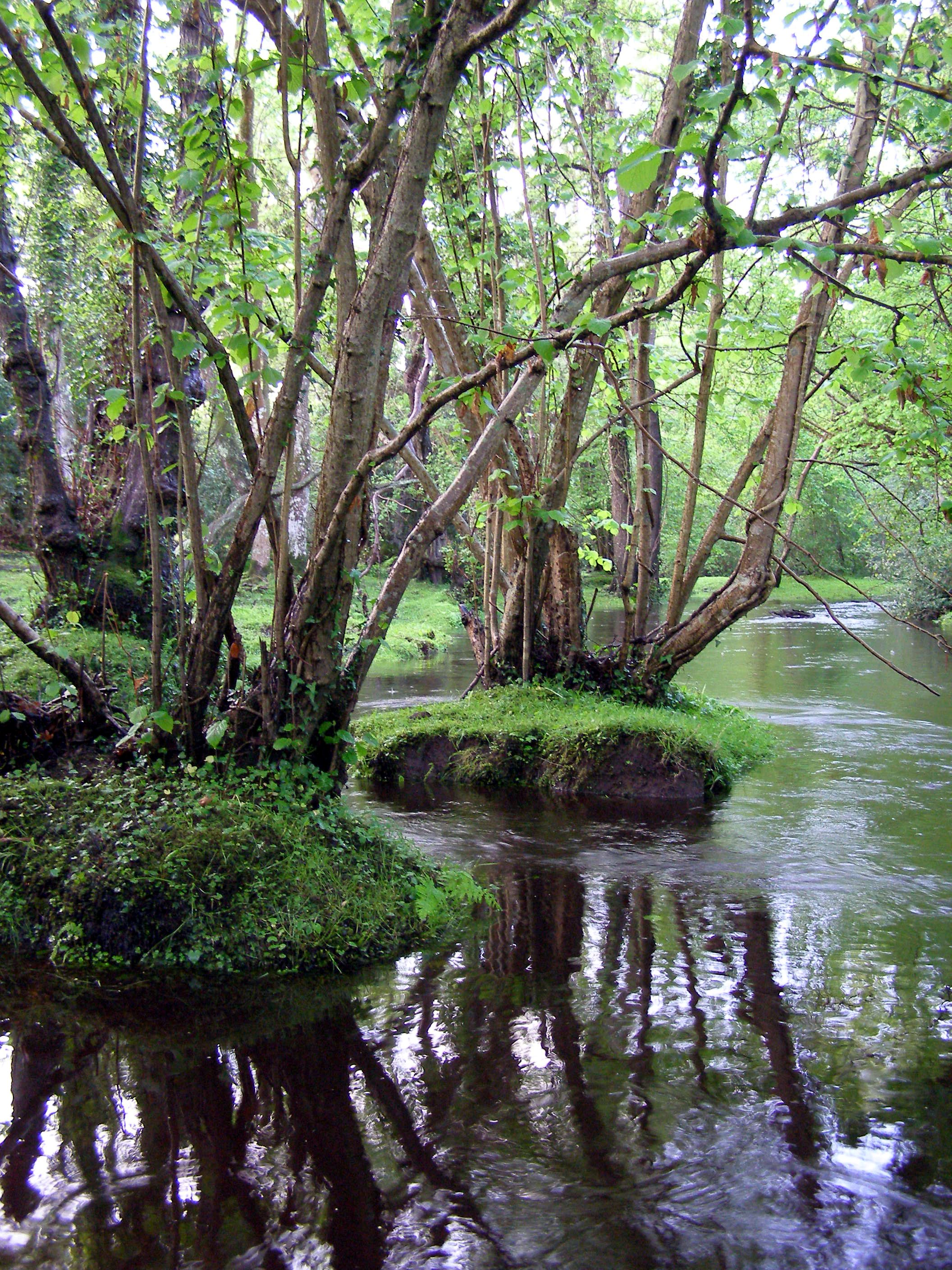
Alder trees by the Beaulieu River in the New Forest

Nowadays, much of this ecoregion has been given over to agriculture – with the growing of wheat, barley and rapeseed particularly common – as well as to the raising of livestock, especially cattle and sheep. In places it is very heavily populated, with towns, suburbs and villages found nearly everywhere – although the plateau of Salisbury Plain remains largely wild.

The most significant centre of population is London, at the head of the Thames estuary, one of the largest cities in the world. Due to this high population density, and to a certain amount of depredation caused by the non-native grey squirrel, edible dormice (in the Chilterns) and deer, this forest ecoregion is considered at high risk, with a critical/endangered conservation status accorded it by the WWF. Air pollution may also be leading to a reduction in beech numbers, through increased susceptibility to disease.

Among fauna found in this ecoregion, the West European hedgehog, red fox, Eurasian badger, European rabbit and wood mouse are relatively common, while the following are classed as near threatened on the IUCN Red List:

- European otter
- Red squirrel
- Harvest mouse
- Hazel dormouse
- Greater horseshoe bat
- Corn crake

The barbastelle, as a vulnerable species on the Red List, is in greater danger still.

Rare plants include the red helleborine, bird's-nest orchid and knothole yoke-moss. Rare fungi include the Devil's bolete and hedgehog mushroom.

== History ==
At the end of the last glaciation, about 10,000 years ago, the area's ecosystem was characterised by a largely treeless tundra. Pollen studies have shown that this was replaced by a taiga of birch, and then pine, before their replacement in turn (c. 4500 BC) by most of the species of tree encountered today – including, by 4000 BC, the beech, which seems to have been introduced from mainland Europe. This was used as a source of flour, ground from the triangular nutlets contained in the "mast", or fruit of the beech, after its tannins had been leached out by soaking. Beechmast has also traditionally been fed to pigs.

However, by 4000 BC, as Oliver Rackham has indicated, the dominant tree species was not the beech, but the small-leaved lime, also known as the pry tree. The wildwood was made up of a patchwork of lime-wood areas and hazel-wood areas, interspersed with oak and elm and other species. The pry seems to have become less abundant now because the climate has turned against it, making it difficult for it to grow from seed. Nevertheless, some remnants of ancient lime-wood still remain in south Suffolk.

Clearance of forests began with the introduction of farming (c. 4500 BC), particularly in the higher-lying parts of the country, like the South Downs. At this time, the whole region, apart from upland areas under plough, and marshy areas (e.g. Romney Marsh in Kent and much of Somerset), was heavily forested, with woodland stretching nearly everywhere.

Notable surviving examples include:

- The Forest of Arden (Warwickshire)
- The Chilterns (on the heights running from Oxfordshire through Buckinghamshire and Hertfordshire to Bedfordshire)
- Epping Forest (on the border of north-east Greater London and Essex)
- Kinver Edge (a remnant of the Mercian forest on the border of south Staffordshire and Worcestershire)
- Morfe Forest (south Shropshire)
- Savernake Forest (Wiltshire)
- Selwood Forest (Somerset)
- The Weald (Kent, East Sussex, West Sussex and Surrey)
- Wychwood (Oxfordshire)
- Wyre Forest (on the border of Worcestershire and Shropshire)

All of these were once far more extensive than they are today. For example, according to a late 9th century writer, the Weald (from the Anglo-Saxon word weald = "forest") once stretched from Kent to Hampshire, and was 120 miles long by 30 broad (190 by 50 km). The New Forest (in south-west Hampshire) remains the largest intact forested area in this ecoregion (at 571 km^{2} (220 sq mi)).

The hedgerow system, which separates fields from lanes and also from other fields, is also extensive across the region, and serves as an important habitat for otherwise displaced woodland fauna, providing shelter, nest sites, and berries for over-wintering birds such as the Redwing. Some species-rich hedgerows date back at least 700 years, if not 1,000. In recent decades many miles of hedgerows have been grubbed up to enlarge fields to make it easier for farmers to use large agricultural machines. Further lengths of hedgerow are frequently degraded by having their grown restricted by cutting with tractor-driven mechanical flails. Meanwhile the traditional more benign method of managing hedges by manual hedge-laying to maintain their vigour and ensure that they cannot be broached by farm animals has been almost completely discontinued due to labour costs and lack of skilled workers.

The woodbank is a specific type of hedgerow, now mostly derelict, which was used to define woodland ownership boundaries and separate woodland from farmland. A ditch and bank were formed along the edge of a wood and trees (such as Hornbeam) planted along the bank. Over the years, the trees were managed by a process called layering to form a thick strong hedge of interlocking stems. Most woodbanks are no longer managed and have grown up into mature multi-stemmed trees with interlocking roots, but do not provide an effective boundary.

For many species of bird, significant estuarine habitats include the Thames and Severn estuaries, and the mid-Essex coast.

The Mesozoic history of the area can be seen in the Jurassic Coast World Heritage Site, where about 180 Ma of fossil-rich sedimentary deposits have been exposed along a 95-mile (153 km) stretch of the Dorset and East Devon coast. The science of palaeontology can be said to have started in large measure here, with the pioneering work of Mary Anning.

The Great Storm of 1987 was responsible for the uprooting of some 15 million trees in this area.

== See also ==
- Ancient woodland
- Biodiversity
- Biodiversity action plan
- Bioregionalism
- Community forests in England
- Conservation biology
- Forestry Commission
- Geology of England
- List of ecoregions
- List of ecoregions in the United Kingdom
- List of forests in the United Kingdom
- National nature reserves in England
- National parks of England and Wales (New Forest and South Downs)
- Protected areas of the United Kingdom
- Royal forest
- Trees of Britain and Ireland
- List of ecoregions in Europe
