= The Big Tree Plant =

British government tree planting campaign from 2011 to 2015

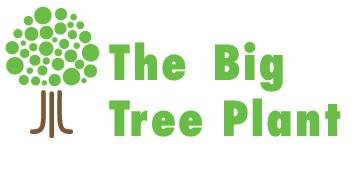
- Big Tree Plant Campaign Logo

A Government-sponsored tree planting campaign in England overview
- Formed: 2010

The Big Tree Plant was a Government-sponsored campaign in England in 2010, to promote the planting of trees in neighbourhoods where people lived and worked. The national campaign ran over four years from 2011 to 2015 and met its objective to plant one million trees.

== Background ==
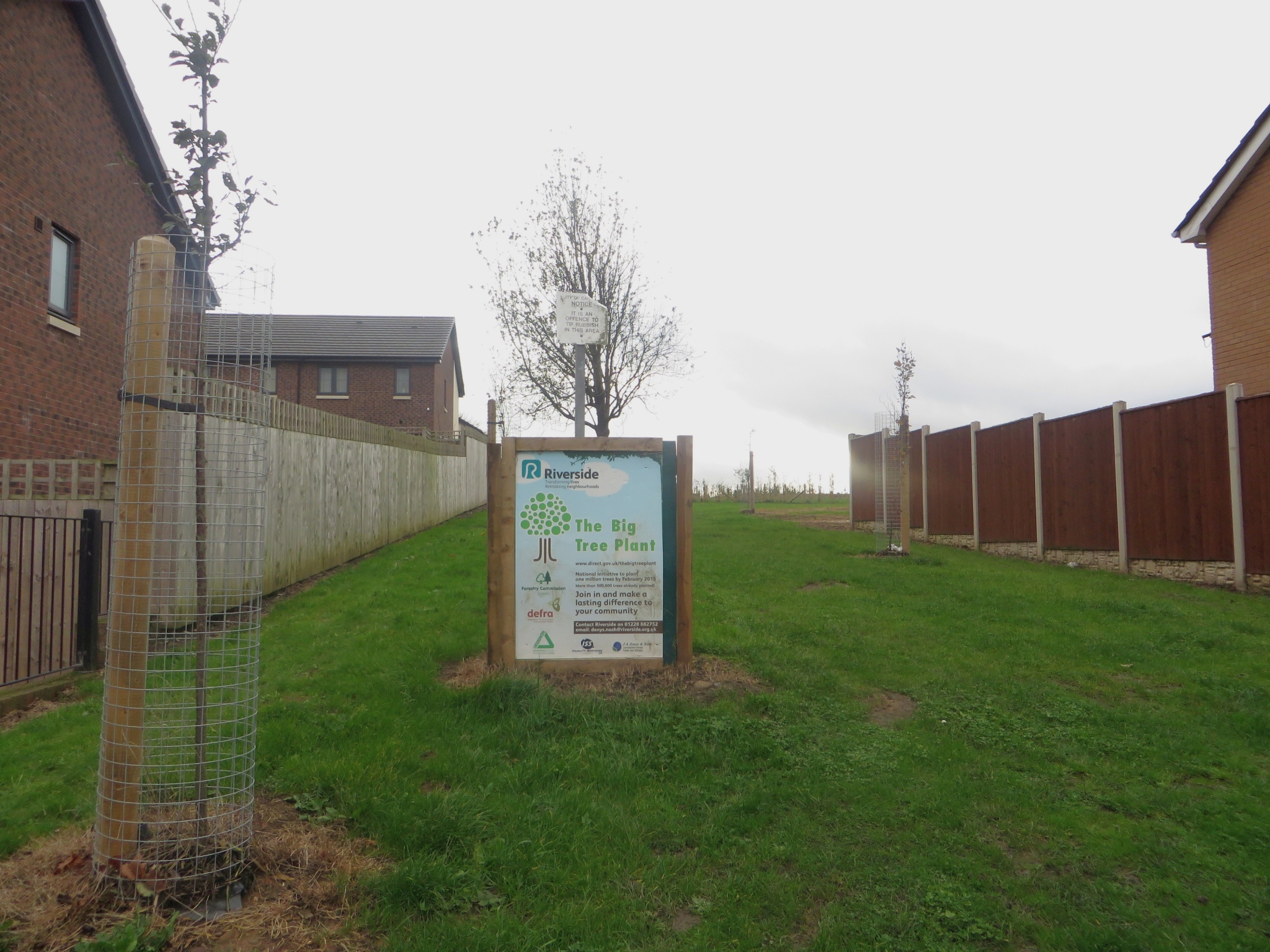
Trees planted on Westrigg Road, Carlisle as part of the scheme

The campaign aimed to halt the ongoing decline in urban and semi-urban tree planting in England and was the first such initiative since Plant A Tree In '73. The decline was highlighted by a survey of urban trees in England carried out in 2005 (published as the report Trees in Towns II in 2008), which found that there had been a 'big reduction' in urban tree planting (compared to a similar 1992 survey) leading to an 'unsatisfactory age structure' with too few young trees, and which concluded that the issue should be 'urgently addressed'.

In London a separate 2007 report, Chainsaw Massacre, found that there were concerns about planting rates in some boroughs, and that mature broadleaf street trees throughout London were under 'severe threat' due to a mixture of development pressures, reduced expenditure, public apathy and antipathy, and (often unsubstantiated) concerns by insurance companies, solicitors and home-owners over subsidence. Both reports also expressed concern over the practice of planting smaller ornamental species rather than large-growing broadleaf trees such as London plane, and particularly larger native trees like lime and oak.

== Funding ==
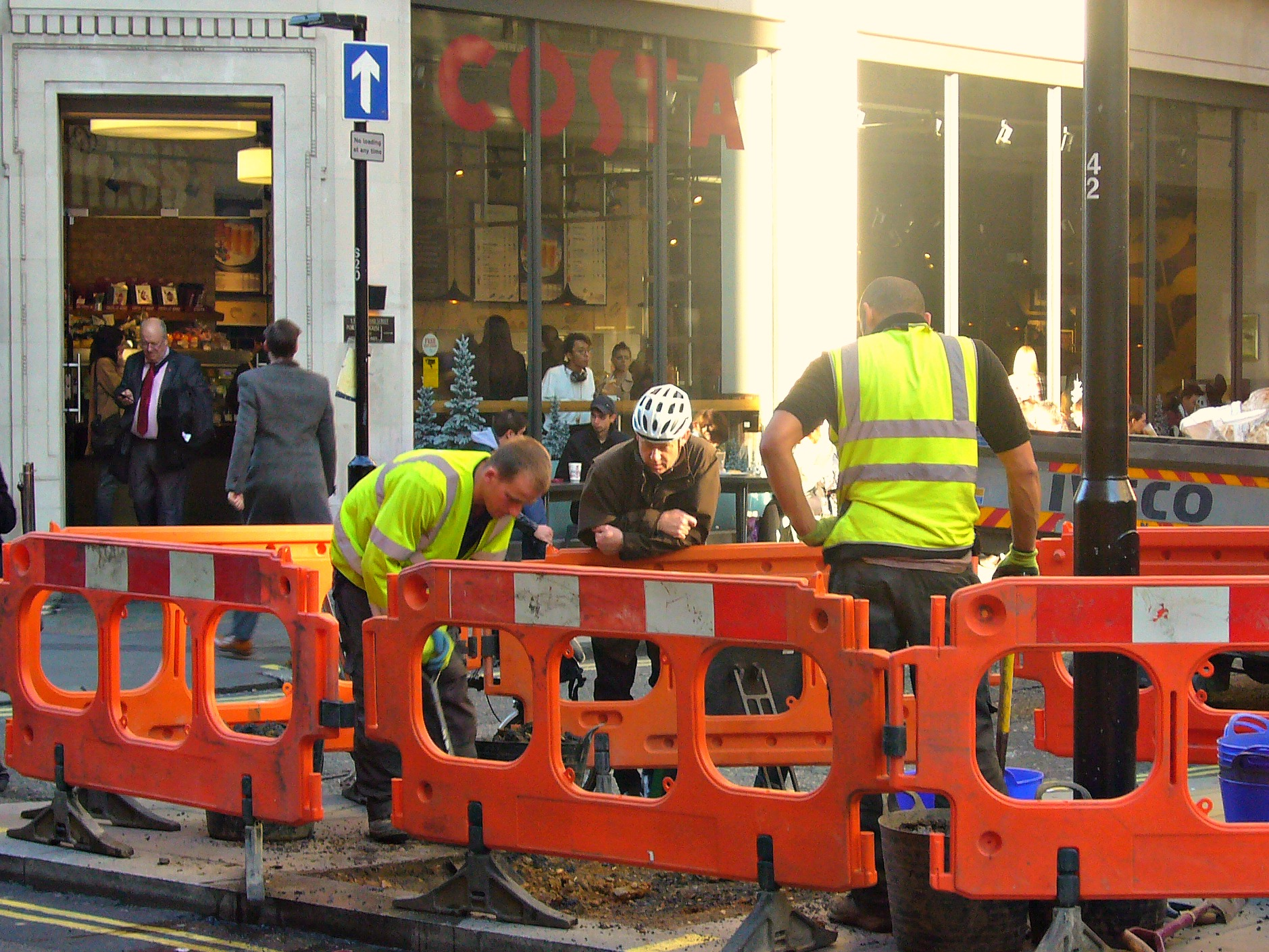
Pit preparation for a Street Tree in Fitzrovia (Central London) part funded by the scheme.

Funding of £4.2m was to be made available for community, civic and other non-profit groups from April 2011. In addition to covering planting costs, grants could be used for related purposes such as community involvement, site surveys and the provision of expert advice. £4m of the funding allocation was promised by the Forestry Commission through 'efficiency savings and re-prioritisation', while the remaining £200,000 came from the existing London Tree and Woodland Community Grant. The independently chaired Big Tree Plant Grants Panel included representatives from civil society organisations, DEFRA, and the Forestry Commission, and met each spring and summer to award funds.

In advance of the main funding, Keep Britain Tidy - one of the partners supporting the initiative - had already invited applications for planting kits from schools in the Government's Eco-School programme.

== Criticism and reactions ==
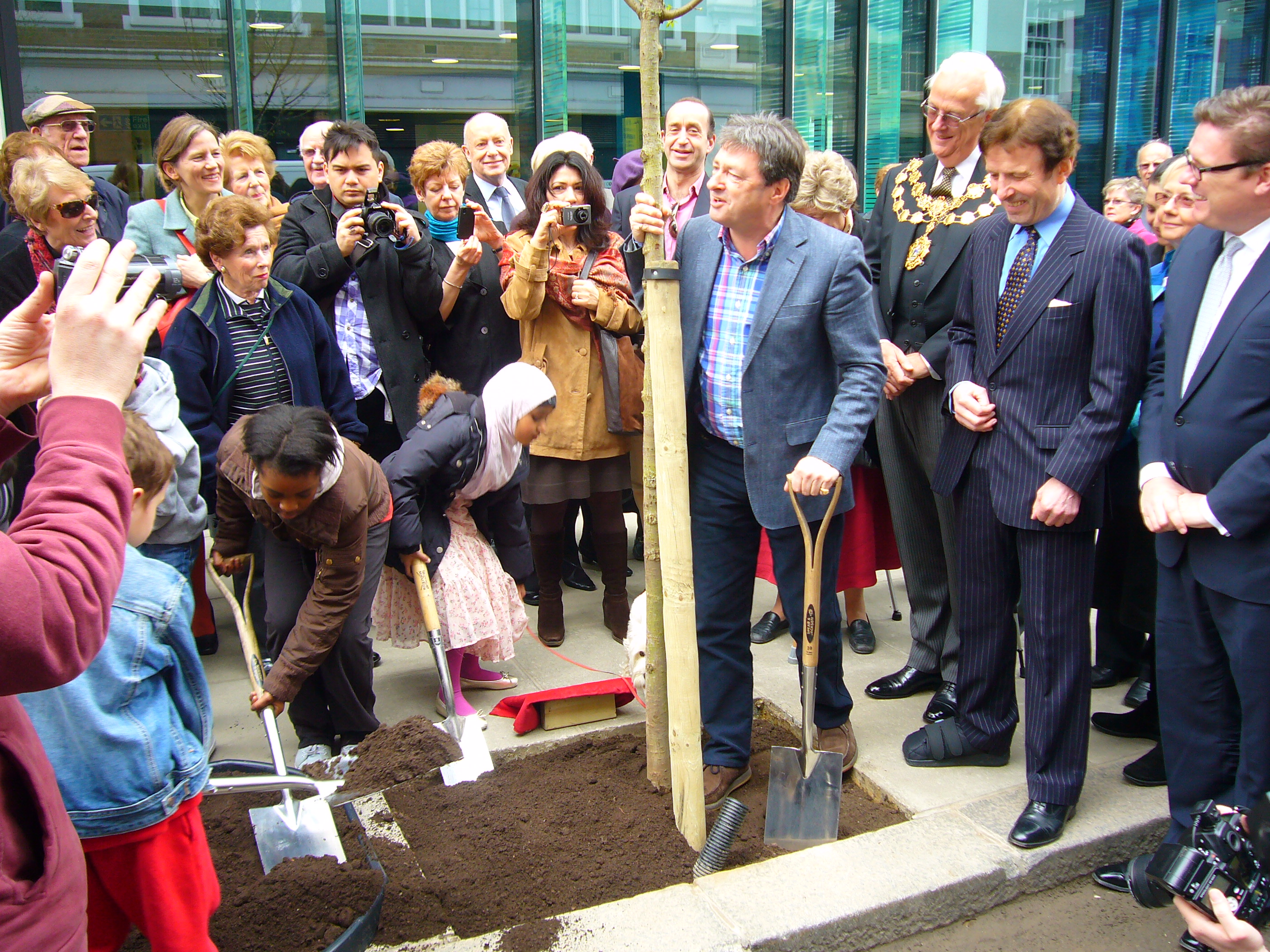
Alan Titchmarsh plants a tree on Bolsover Street in London part supported by the campaign

The funding arrangements, specifically the fact that the grants would normally only cover up to 75% of the cost of each scheme (although free labour could be offset against this), were criticised by some as favouring better-off over deprived communities. Other projects which coordinated external funding from local stakeholders were more successful.

The government stated that “Seventy percent of the trees in The Big Tree Plant programme were being planted in England’s most deprived areas.” The programme was generally well received. 62,336 trees were planted in the Mersey Forest representing 6% of England's total Big Tree Plant target of 1 million trees. Conservation Volunteers and community groups also managed to plant over 143,000 trees all around England during the programme.

== Partners ==
The DEFRA-led The Big Tree Plant campaign was backed by a number of partners including The Tree Council, Woodland Trust, Trees for Cities, England's 12 Community Forests, the National Forest, BTCV, Civic Voice, Groundwork UK, Keep Britain Tidy, the Local Government Association, the Department for Communities and Local Government and the Forestry Commission.

The national campaign's partnership planted one million trees between 2011 and 2015.

== See also ==
- Plant A Tree In '73 - a similar campaign in 1973.
- Green belt
- Green urbanism
- Tree planting
- Trees for Cities
- Urban forest
- Urban forestry
- Urban green space
- Urban reforestation
