= North Atlantic moist mixed forests =

Ecoregion in the British Isles

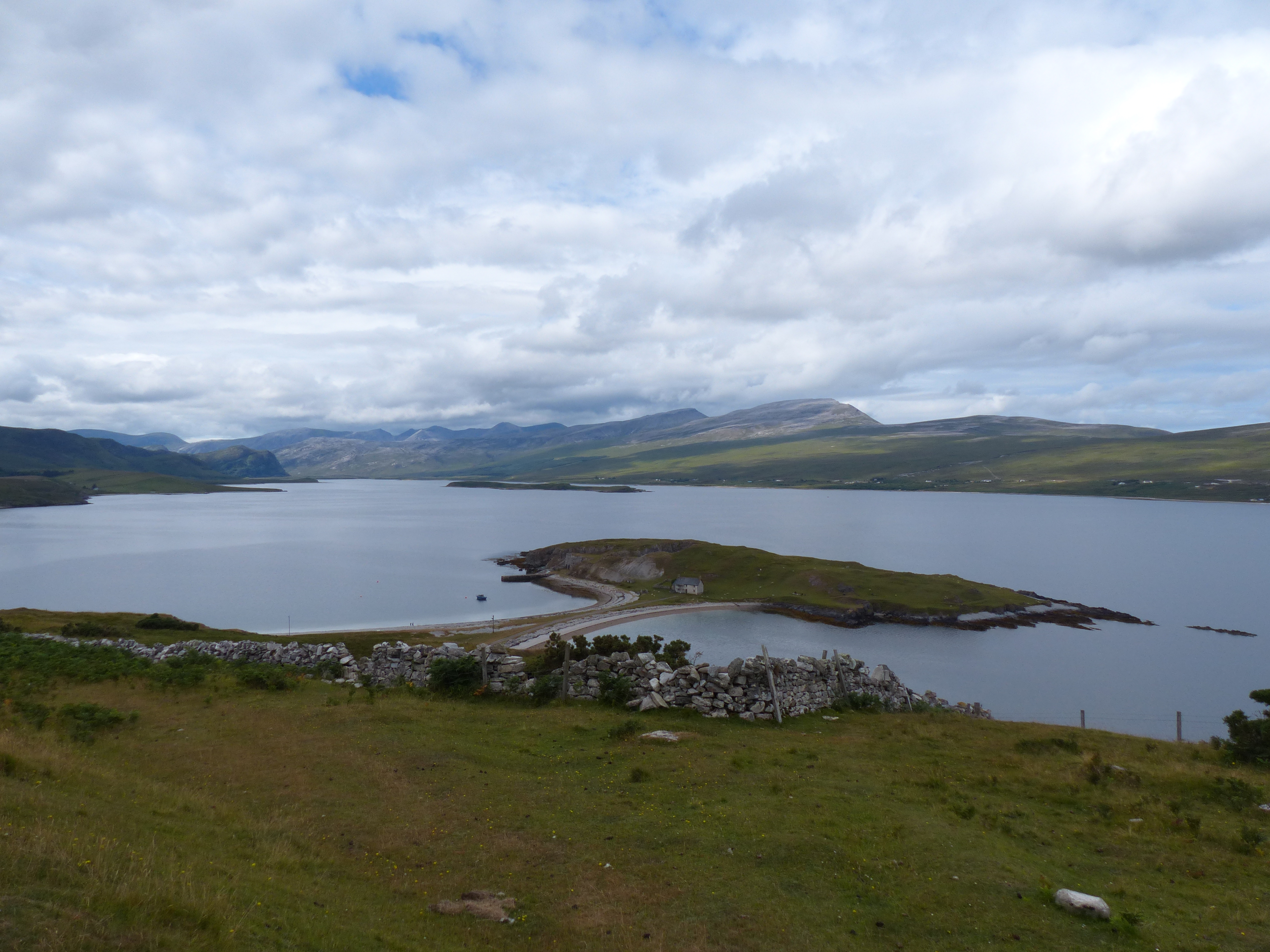
- Loch Eriboll, in Northern Scotland

- Map of North Atlantic moist mixed forests

Ecology
- Realm: Palearctic
- Biome: Temperate broadleaf and mixed forests
- Borders: Celtic broadleaf forests; Caledonian forest

Geography
- Area: 22,000 km^{2} (8,500 mi^{2})
- Countries: Republic of Ireland; United Kingdom (Northern Ireland and Scotland); Denmark (Faroe Islands)

Conservation
- Conservation status: Critical/endangered

The North Atlantic moist mixed forests is a temperate broadleaf and mixed forest ecoregion in Northwestern Europe. It consists of maritime forests and heathlands on the western and northern coasts of Ireland, Scotland, and neighboring islands. The ecoregion has undergone major habitat loss.

== Location ==
The North Atlantic moist mixed forests occur along the western and northern coasts of Ireland and Scotland, stretching from southwestern Ireland to the north coast of Scotland, and including the Hebrides, Shetland, Orkney, and Faroe islands.

== Flora ==
Naturally occurring plant communities include:

- Hemiboreal pine forests, predominantly of Scots pine (Pinus sylvestris) with deciduous broadleaf trees.
- Atlantic dwarf shrub heaths, composed of low shrubs, grasses, herbs, and mosses. Dry heaths are characterized by ling (Calluna vulgaris), bell heather (Erica cinerea), cross-leaved heath (Erica tetralix), and blaeberry (Vaccinium myrtillus). Wet heaths are characterized by the shrubs E. tetralix and bog-myrtle (Myrica gale), the sedge Scirpus cespitosus, and purple moor-grass (Molinia caerulea).
- Ombrotrophic mires (quaking bogs) in north-central Scotland.

== Fauna ==
- Red fox
- Badger
- Roe deer
- Red deer
- Barn owl

== Threats ==
Western Scotland's and Ireland's forests have undergone significant habitat loss and damage through deforestation and hunting of its once abundant wildlife. Animals such as the grey wolf, wild boar, brown bear, European bison, Eurasian lynx, tarpan and golden eagle used to inhabit the forests; however, due to over-hunting and excessive timber extraction, the animals have lost their habitats. The North Atlantic moist mixed forests ecoregion is classified as critical/endangered by the World Wildlife Fund.

== Protected areas ==
Protected areas in the ecoregion include:

- Caithness and Sutherland Peatlands Special Protection Area (1453.13 km^{2}), Scotland
- Glenveagh National Park (334.46 km^{2}), Republic of Ireland
- Lewis Peatlands (589.84 km^{2}), Scotland
- Stack's to Mullaghareirk Mountains, West Limerick Hills and Mount Eagle Special Protection Area (556 km^{2}), Republic of Ireland

== Prehistory ==
The ecoregion is relatively young with regard to human settlement, due to glaciation during the most recent ice age, less than 10,000 years ago. Mesolithic peoples were certainly in evidence circa 9000 to 8000 years ago throughout the present day Irish portion of the ecoregion, as well as somewhat later in the western Scotland areas of the North Atlantic moist mixed forests. Neolithic farming ensued, as grain farming technologies developed, along with advancing forms of livestock tending, along with appearance of some of the early Neolithic and Bronze Age archaeological monumental sites in the region including standing stones and stone circles.

== See also ==
- Ancient woodland
- Biodiversity
- Biodiversity action plan
- Bioregionalism
- Community forests in England
- Conservation biology
- Forestry Commission
- Geology of England
- List of ecoregions
- List of forests in the United Kingdom
- National nature reserves in England
- Protected areas of the United Kingdom
- Trees of Britain and Ireland
