= Basing Wood =

Woodland near Basingstoke, UK

Coordinates: 51.29375357°N 1.07674599°W

Basing Wood is a 120-hectare (300-acre) woodland near Basingstoke, England.

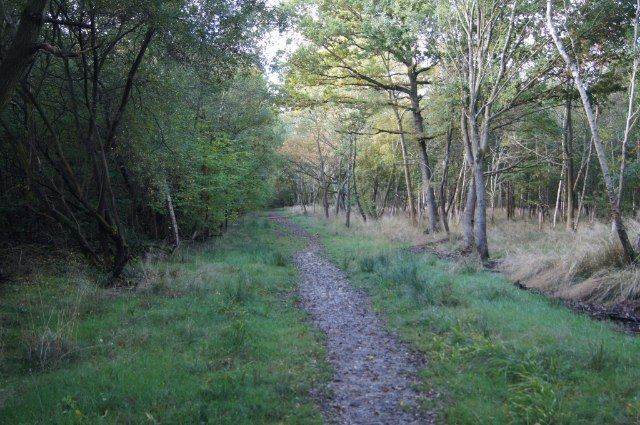
Path into Basing Wood

== Wildlife ==
The wood consists of broadleaf and conifer trees, particularly the Scots pine (Pinus sylvestris), Corsican pine (Pinus nigra), and the Lawson cypress (Chamaecyparis lawsoniana). There are also trees such as oak, ash and alder.

The fauna of Basing Wood includes roe, fallow and muntjac deer, red foxes, rabbits, great crested newts, and many species of birds. It also provides a habitat for the declining purple emperor butterfly.

== See also ==
- Community forests in England
