= Northern Forest =

Northern Forest may refer to:

- Northern Forest (England), a proposed preserve
- Northern Forest (race), a Russian car rally
- Great North Woods, an American forest spanning northern New England and New York
- Subarctic, an anthropological region referred to as "Northern Forest" in some textbooks
- Northern Forest Complex, a protected area in Myanmar; see Hkakaborazi National Park
