= Western Forest =

Forest in the West of England

- Western Forest on 2011 South West England districts map

The Western Forest is a forest of existing and future woodlands in the West of England: more trees will be planted in Bristol, Wiltshire, Gloucestershire and Somerset. The Forest of Avon Trust will be involved. It will initially develop 2,500 hectares (9.7 sq mi) of new woodland.

== See also ==
- Northern Forest (England)
