= The Tree Council =

British registered charity

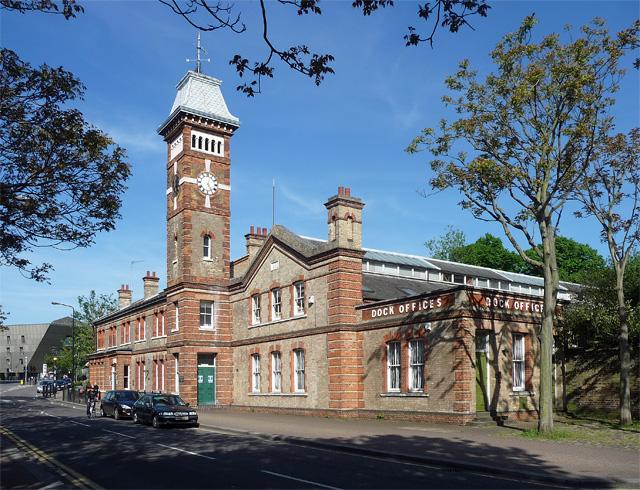
- Office in London, UK
- Formation: 1973
- Legal status: Registered charity
- Purpose: Woodland conservation
- Location: Canada Water, London
- Region served: UK
- Website: treecouncil.org.uk

The Tree Council was founded in 1973 in the United Kingdom, and became a registered charity in 1978. Its primary objective is to act as an umbrella organisation for local groups involved in the planting, care and conservation of trees throughout the United Kingdom, and its creation followed the government-sponsored Plant A Tree In '73 campaign.

The charity is based at Canada Water, Surrey Quays, London. Its activities include:

- Managing a national force of volunteer Tree Wardens who champion their local trees
- Young Tree Champions programme
- Orchards for Schools
- Science and research
- Trees Outside Woodland
- Community grants

== Projects ==
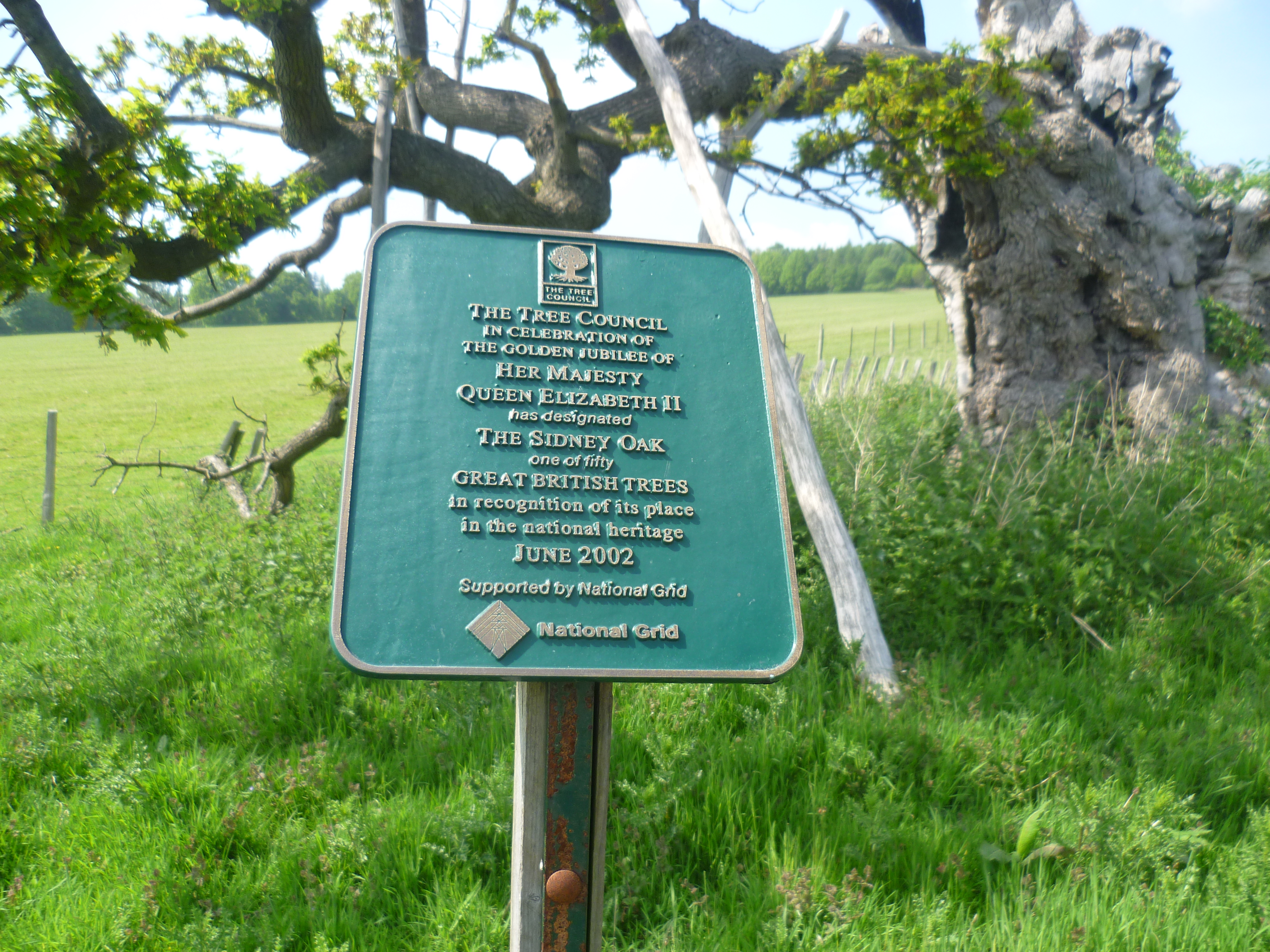
Great British Trees plaque in Penshurst Park, Kent

- In 2002, selecting 50 Great British Trees to honour the Queen's Golden Jubilee of accession to the throne
- Supporting the UK government's Big Tree Plant campaign, which planted one million trees between 2011 and 2015
- Supporting the 2017 Charter for Trees, Woods and People
- Supporting the Queen's Green Canopy to mark her Platinum Jubilee in 2022
- Organising National Tree Week in November each year
- Hadley Wood Hedgerow Trials

== Notable people ==
Landscape architect and garden designer Dame Sylvia Crowe was the organisation's chairman between 1974 and 1976. As of 2026, Joel Cadbury is The Tree Council's chairman.

== See also ==
- International Tree Foundation
- Future Trees Trust
- Trees for Cities
- The Tree Register
- Woodland Trust
