= Great Northumberland Forest =

Coordinates: 55°12′10″N 2°09′06″W

The Great Northumberland Forest is a proposed new forest in the north of England. Announced in September 2019, it is intended that up to a million trees will be planted between 2020 and 2024.

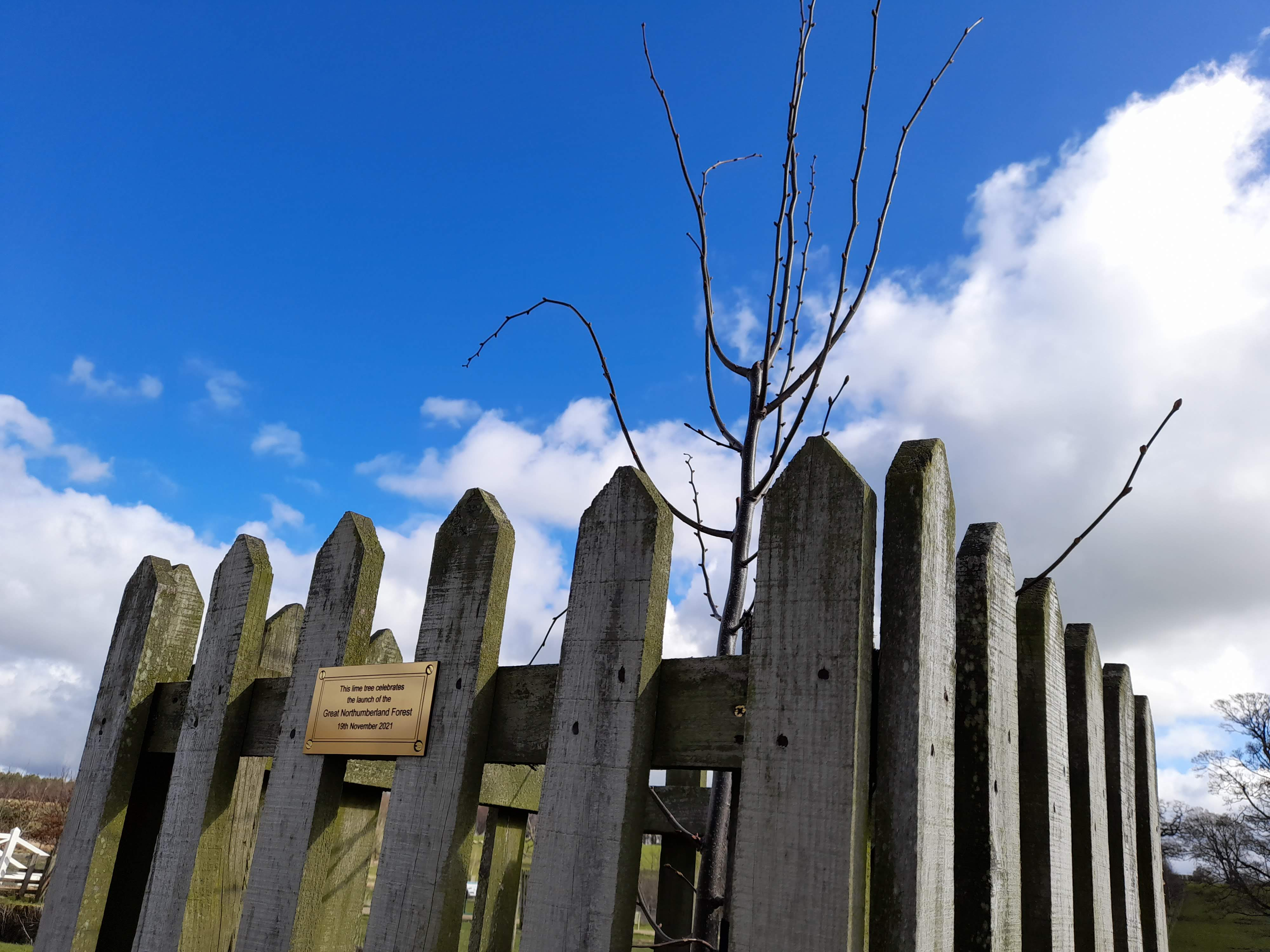
A lime tree planted at Kirkharle on launch day

== Announcement ==
The Great Northumberland Forest was announced by Secretary of State for Environment, Food and Rural Affairs Theresa Villiers at the Conservative Party Conference on 27 September 2019. It was part of a package of measures that were presented as leading to a carbon-neutral United Kingdom by 2050. The plans had been championed by the Member of Parliament for Hexham, Guy Opperman, who stated that the proposed forest would help absorb carbon dioxide from the atmosphere, increase the provision of green space in the region for recreational purposes and provide the nucleus for a new forestry/timber industry. The scheme was welcomed by Greenpeace but they noted that it was only a fraction of the 700 million new trees that they say need to be planted before 2030.

== Planned forest ==
It is not intended to be one new forest block, but rather a more wooded county generally. However, the project does start with three sites. It is intended that up to one million trees will be planted across 500 hectares (1,200 acres) of land in Northumberland between 2020 and Spring 2024. A variety of tree types will be planted in the forest, rather than solely conifers which have been used in other new forest schemes. A new organisation, the Northumberland Woodland Creation Partnership, has been established to assist local residents, landowners and environmental groups to plan for the woodland creation. The forest will initially be planted at three sites on government-owned or newly acquired land. The Forestry Partnership will then look to expand the forest by identifying new sites suitable for afforestation, of which there is an estimated 120,000 hectares (300,000 acres) in the county.

Planting was timed to start ahead of the UN Climate Change Conference (COP26), which was scheduled to take place in Glasgow in November 2020 before its postponement to November 2021.

It was in the Conservative manifesto for the 2019 United Kingdom general election.

The Great Northumberland Forest area is adjacent to the North East Community Forest, which includes the local authorities of Tyne and Wear as well as Durham County Council.

== Planting ==
By May 2020 Forestry England had started planting Rushy Knowe, a new 145 hectares (360 acres) forest on the banks of Kielder Water. That same month it announced the purchase of 100 hectares (250 acres) of land at Monkridge, West Woodburn for the second of three sites. The third site has not yet been announced.

Between the announcement in 2019 and the 2023-2024 planting season, it is calculated that over 932 hectares (2,300 acres) of woodland has been created, plus over 2.9 million individual trees in smaller schemes (hedgerow trees, individual trees e.g. in parkland style). This includes tree establishment funded through Countryside Stewardship, The Woodland Carbon Fund / The Woodland Carbon Code, the Northumberland Wildlife Trust, the Rivers Trusts in the county, Farming in Protected Landscape funding, the Green Recovery Challenge Fund, and trees planted as part of planning applications.

== Launch event ==
A launch event was held at Kirkharle in November 2021. "Great Northumberland Forest Launch" on YouTube

== See also ==
- Northern Forest (England)
- National Forest (England)
