= Drum Manor Forest Park =

Forest in Northern Ireland

Coordinates: 54°38′35″N 6°49′28″W

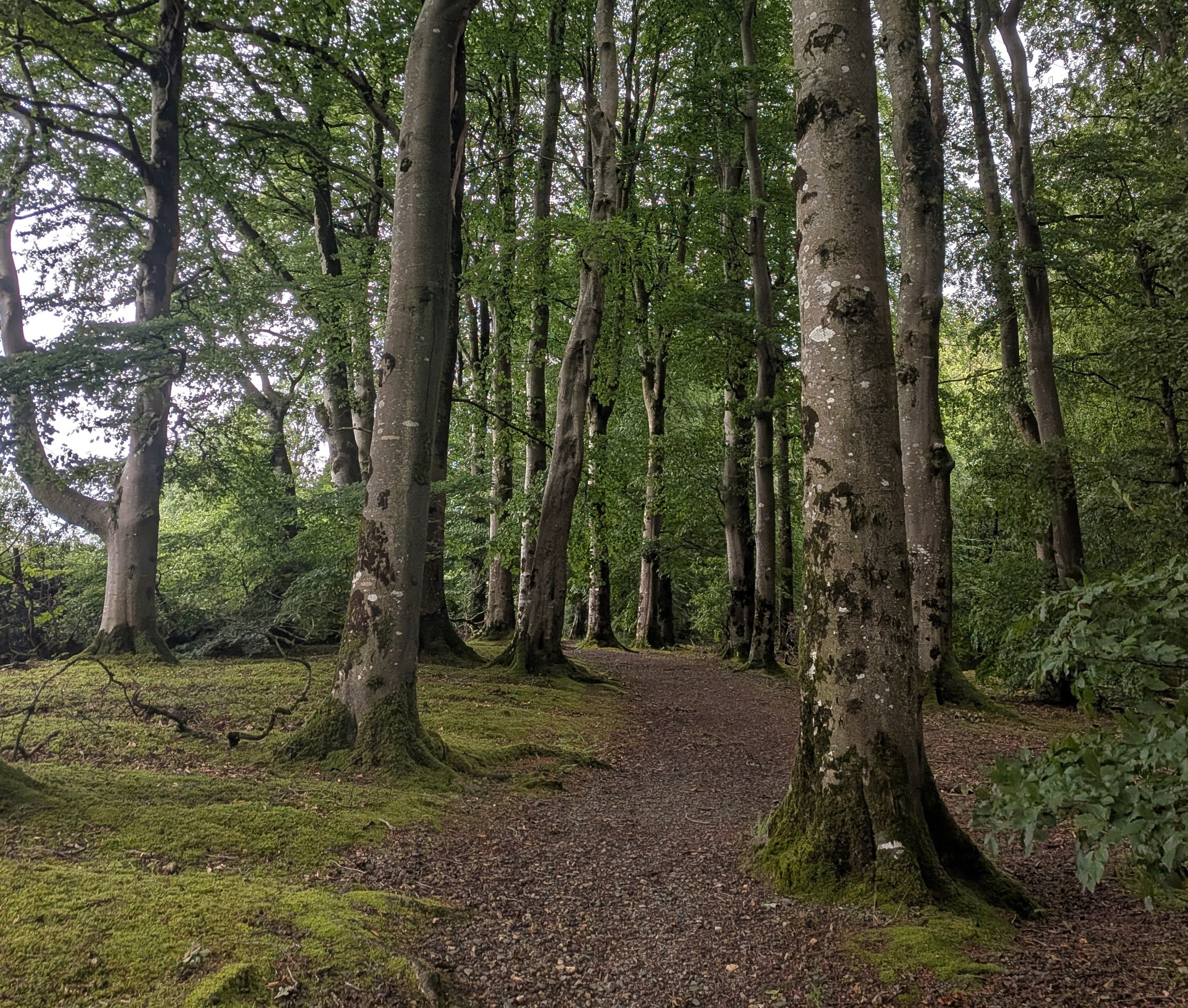
A trail at Drum Manor Forest Park

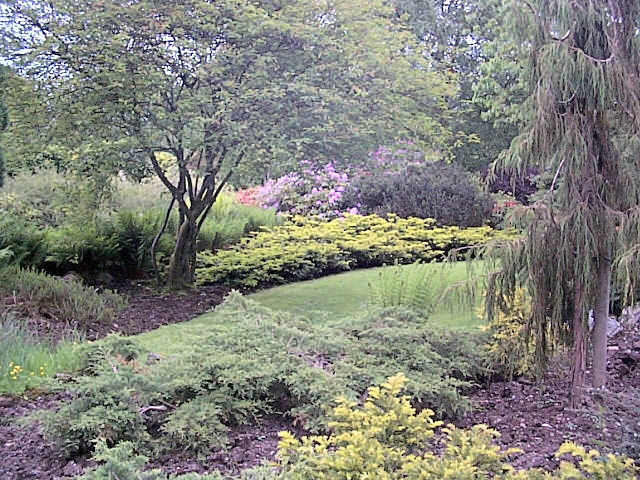
Drum Manor Forest Park gardens in summer

Drum Manor Forest Park is a forest in Northern Ireland, south of the Sperrin Mountains and west of Lough Neagh. Formerly the site of Drum Manor, it was opened to the public in 1970 after being purchased from a private landowner. The park features a playground, and the ruins of the manor house, which are a popular backdrop for wedding photography. The gardens include Blue Atlas Cedars, yew trees, fishponds and a wildfowl lake. A walled garden now serves as a habitat for butterflies.

== History ==
Drum Manor Forest Park was for around 300 years the home of the Richardson's of Drum before passing into the related Close family in the early 20th century until 1964. Not long after, the Forestry Service took possession. In the 1970s, the Forestry Service partly demolished the manor house to avoid paying liability rates. The ground-floor walls are still standing, and the ruins are a popular site for wedding photography. The remains of a Japanese garden planted by the Forestry Service and an arboretum are still visible, along with a terrace and pleasure grounds. The gardens include rare and valuable species such as Blue Atlas Cedars and yew. There is a large fishpond that dates from before 1830, and a later wildfowl lake created when the pleasure grounds were altered in 1870. The walled garden now functions as a sheltered habitat for a butterfly garden. In early 2025, the park sustained significant damage during Storms Darragh, Eowyn and Herminia. Several mature trees were lost, including some thought to be over a century old, and restoration work has been ongoing to ensure public safety and protect the remaining woodland habitat.

== Facilities ==
Access to the park is from the A505 Cookstown to Omagh Road. The park has a large car park, a campsite and touring facilities, with fresh water, shower and laundry amenities. There is a playground and toilets. Areas of the park remain a working forest.

== See also ==
- Forests in the United Kingdom
