= Friston Forest =

Forest in East Sussex, England

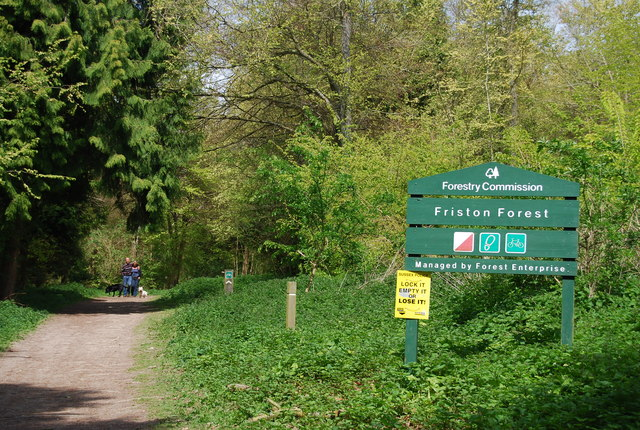
- Entrance to Friston Forest in April 2009

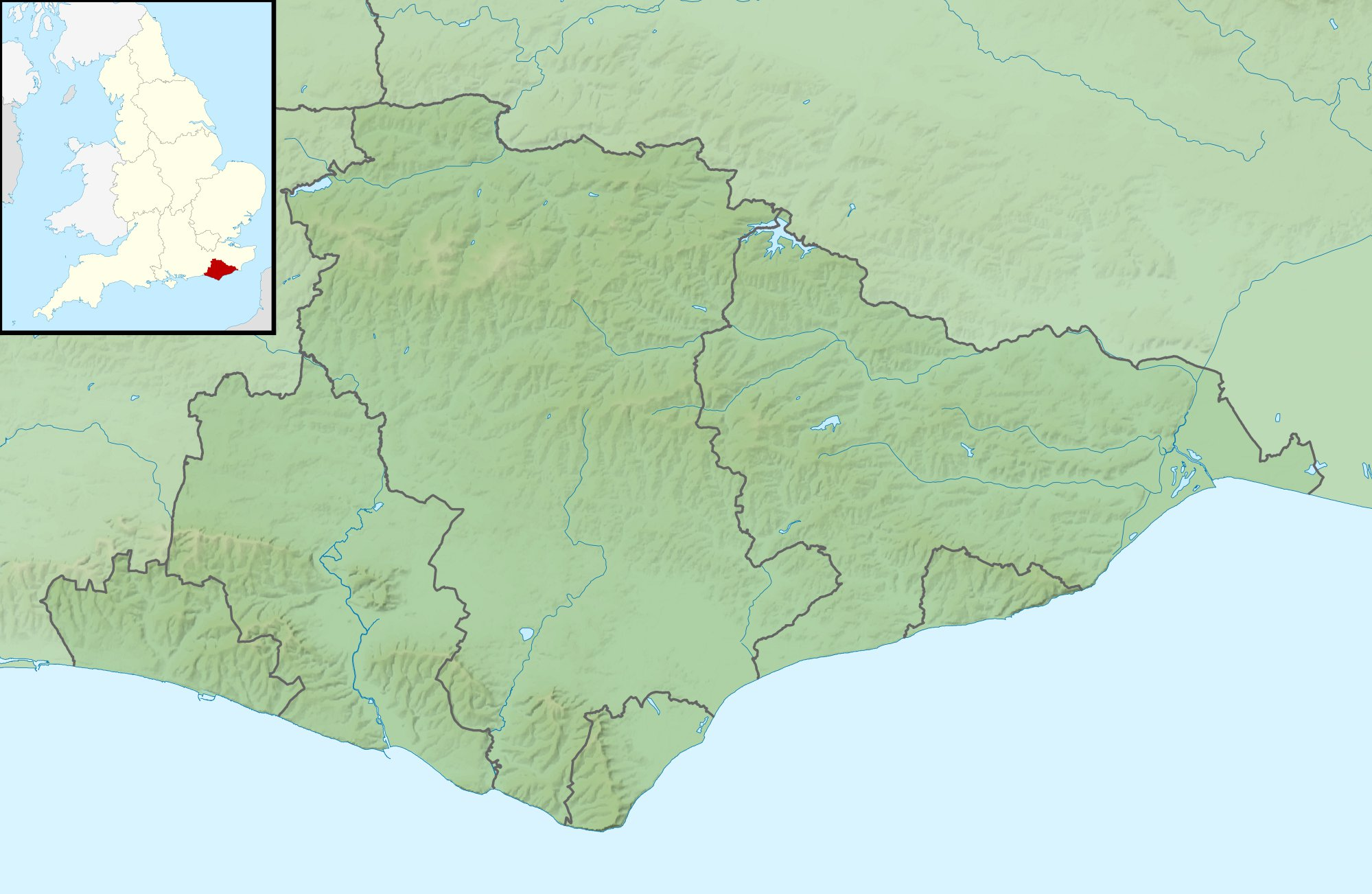
- Location within East Sussex
- Interactive map of Friston Forest

Geography
- OS grid: TQ544007
- Coordinates: 50°46′52.9″N 0°09′11″E
- Area: 2.79 km^{2} (1.08 sq mi)

Administration
- Owner: Forestry England

Friston Forest is a forest, located between Seaford and Eastbourne in East Sussex. It is part of the South Downs National Park area. The forest is managed by Forestry England and covers an area of 2.79 square kilometres, or 278.73 ha.

== History ==
Friston Forest was planted in the 1930–40s by the Forestry Commission. The most common species of tree planted was beech, because of the chalk and limestone soil.

== See also ==
- List of forests in the United Kingdom
