= Celtic broadleaf forests =

Ecoregion in the British Isles

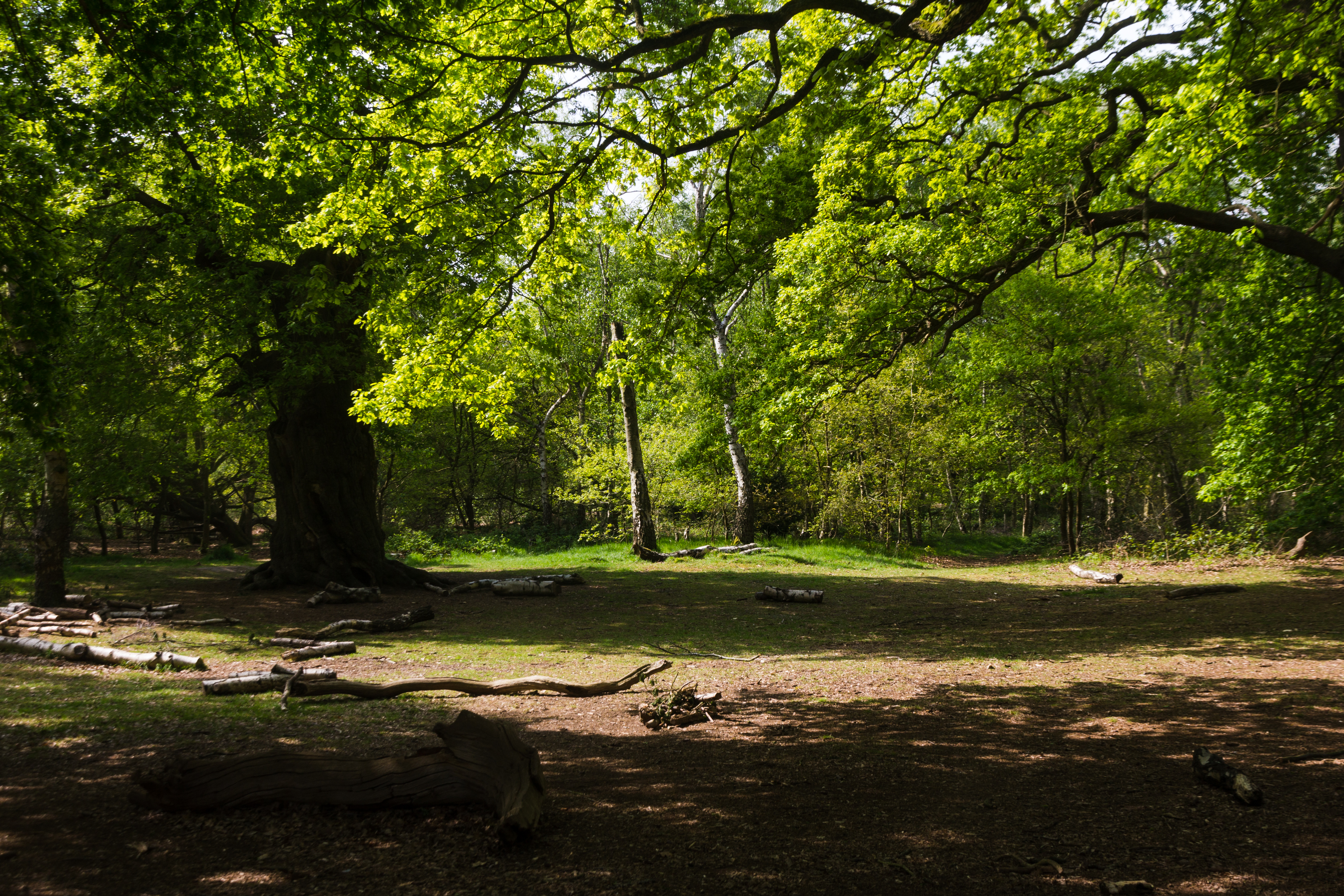
- Sherwood Forest, Nottinghamshire

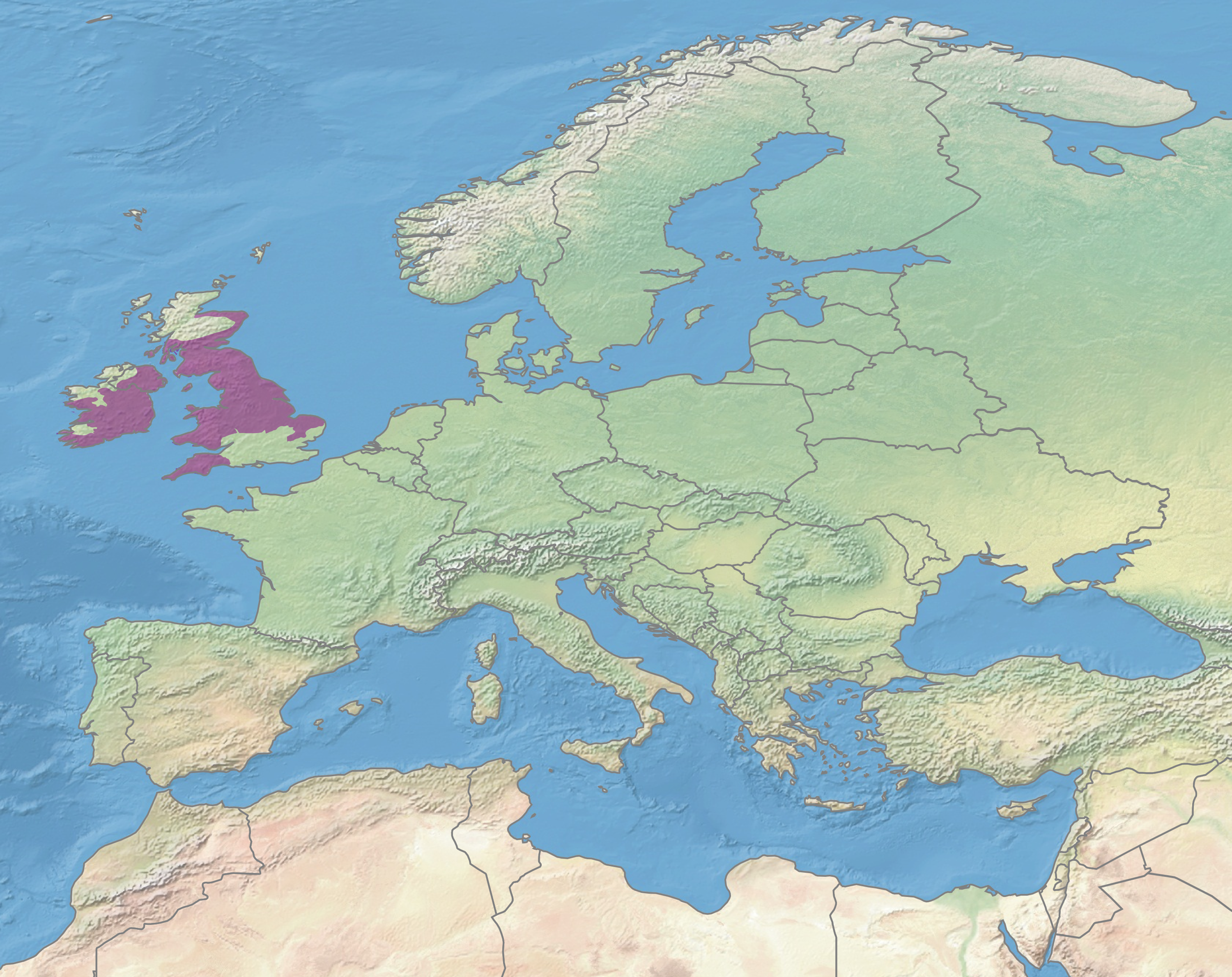
- Location of the Celtic broadleaf forests

Ecology
- Realm: Palearctic
- Biome: temperate broadleaf and mixed forests
- Borders: Caledonian forest; English Lowlands beech forests; North Atlantic moist mixed forests

Geography
- Area: 209,000 km^{2} (81,000 mi^{2})
- Countries: Republic of Ireland; United Kingdom

Conservation
- Conservation status: critical/endangered

The Celtic broadleaf forests are a terrestrial ecoregion that covers most of the islands of Great Britain and Ireland.

== Geography ==
The Celtic broadleaf forests occupy most of the islands of Great Britain and Ireland, including the Republic of Ireland and the United Kingdom countries of England, Scotland, Wales, and Northern Ireland. Portions of western Ireland and Scotland are in the North Atlantic moist mixed forests ecoregion, and the Scottish Highlands are in the Caledonian forest ecoregion. Southeastern and south-central England are in the English Lowlands beech forests ecoregion.

== Climate ==
The climate of the forest is oceanic, leading to frequent precipitation, high precipitation days, high moisture and low sunshine levels; temperature extremes are rare. The combination of moisture and low evaporation (low sunshine amounts) leads to high dampness levels.

== Flora ==
The principal plant communities include:

- lowland to submontane acidophilous oak forests,
- mixed oak forests, principally of English oak (Quercus robur) and sessile oak (Quercus petraea) along with Picea abies, Abies alba, Alnus glutinosa, Fagus sylvatica, Taxus baccata, Acer pseudoplatanus, Malus sylvestris, Viburnum lantana, Fraxinus excelsior, Tilia cordata, Aesculus hippocastanum, Rhamnus cathartica, Ulmus glabra, Ulmus minor, Populus alba, Pinus sylvestris, Betula pendula, Populus tremula, Populus nigra, Salix alba, Juglans regia, Juniperus communis, Prunus padus, and Corylus avellana.
- mixed oak-ash forests.

Plant communities with smaller areas include:

- western boreal and nemoral-montane birch forests,
- fen and swamp forests,
- ombrotrophic mires in northern England and southern Scotland.

In addition to the two native oak species (Quercus robur and Q. petraea), broad-leafed deciduous trees include common ash, silver birch, European aspen, and common elm.

== Fauna ==
Animals known to inhabit the forests are as follows;

- Deer
- Red deer
- Roe deer
- European badger
- European hedgehog
- European otter
- Horseshoe bat
  - Greater horseshoe bat
  - Lesser horseshoe bat
- Red fox
- Stoat
- Weasel

Many other species once inhabited the forest; however, due to exploitation of natural resources, deforestation and hunting, many animals have become locally extinct. Many of these animals were once numerous across the British isles, including the grey wolf, brown bear, wild boar, Eurasian lynx, and European beaver.

== Habitat status ==
Ninety percent of the Celtic forest habitat has been destroyed, generally over the last few thousand years, due to agriculture, fire-wood use and general deforestation. The outcome is an ecoregion which has not only lost most of its pristine cover, but which has been heavily degraded by fragmentation. The forests today are in a critical status, with the majority of the land having become the rolling pasture-hills typically associated with England.

== Prehistory ==
This ecoregion is relatively young, having been buried under deep ice during the Last Glacial Maximum. Human habitation began with Mesolithic peoples who were present shortly after the ice retreated, c. 9000–8000 years ago, scattered throughout the present-day English portion of the ecoregion, as well as in the Welsh, Irish, and eastern Scottish areas of the Celtic broadleaf forests.

Archeological evidence shows indigenous towns such as York had existed for a millennium prior to the Romans arriving, but the recorded history of the ecoregion begins with major Roman urban settlements established in the first century AD. Viking settlement in coastal areas of western Scotland, Wales, and eastern Ireland was widespread from at least the ninth century AD.
