= Queen Elizabeth Diamond Jubilee Wood =

Woodland in Leicestershire, England

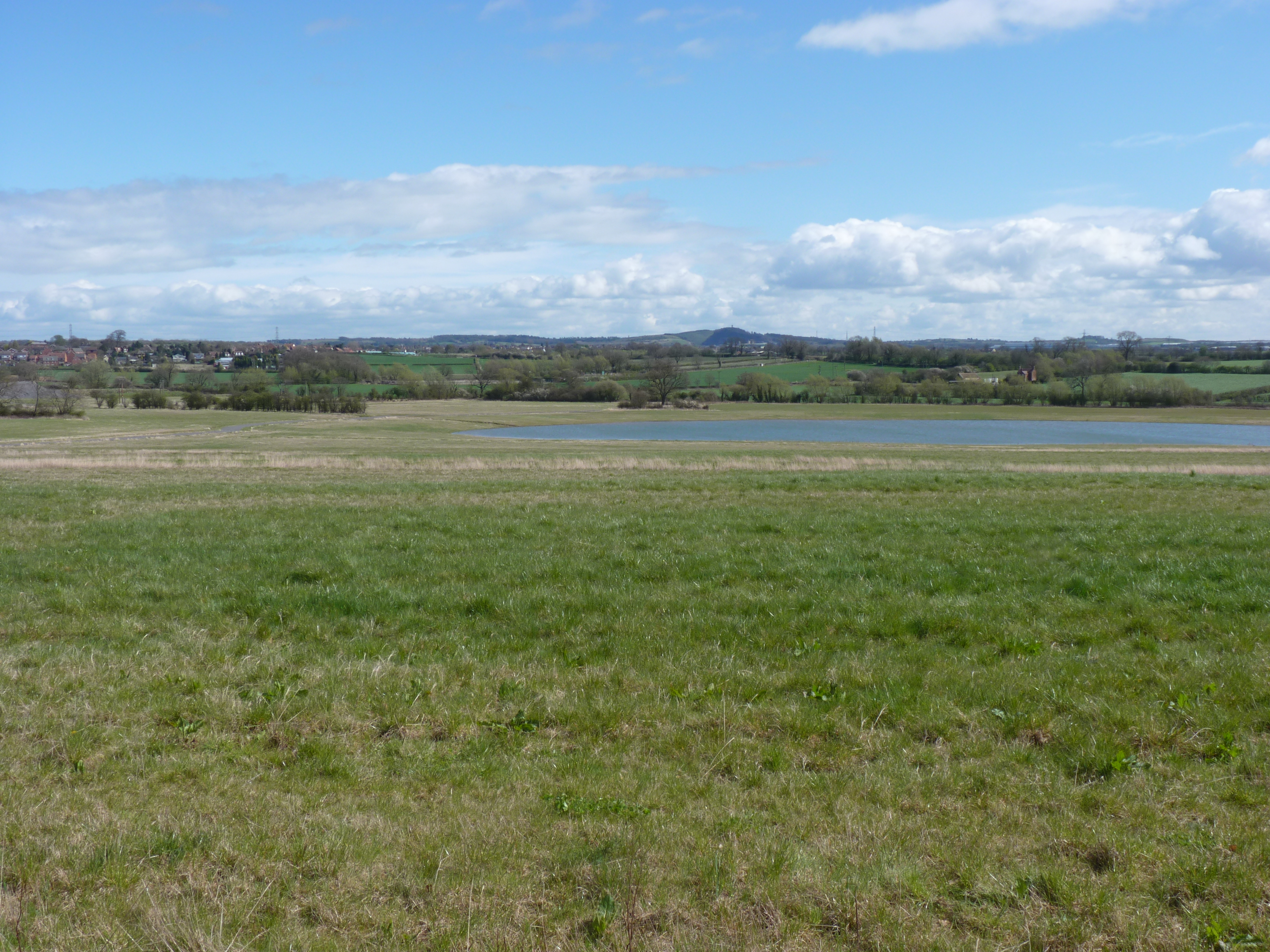
- View across the site before the tree planting began
- Interactive map of Queen Elizabeth Diamond Jubilee Wood
- Type: Woodland
- Location: Normanton le Heath, Leicestershire, England
- OS grid: SK3812
- Coordinates: 52.7094°N 1.4308°W
- Area: 186 hectares (460 acres)
- Operator: Woodland Trust
- Website: woodland trust

Location of Flagship Diamond Wood, Leicestershire

The Queen Elizabeth Diamond Jubilee Wood (initially known as the Flagship Diamond Wood) is a woodland in Leicestershire, UK created in 2012. Covering 186 hectares (460 acres), it is the centrepiece of a wide-ranging Jubilee Project by the Woodland Trust to mark the 2012 Diamond Jubilee of Queen Elizabeth II. The site incorporates a former opencast coal mine which now has a newly created lake, as well as former arable land and 7 hectares (17 acres) of existing ancient woodland and old hedgerows. Situated between the villages of Normanton le Heath, Heather and Ravenstone, and close to Coalville and Ashby de la Zouch, it is in the middle of the National Forest.

== Jubilee Project ==
The Woodland Trust Jubilee project is a UK-wide project to encourage the planting of trees – especially native broadleaved trees – to mark the Diamond Jubilee. The target is to get 6 million trees planted by this process. Many hundreds of individuals and organisations have joined this scheme, and will be recorded in a 'Royal Record' similar to the 1936-37 Royal Record of tree plantings for the coronation of King George VI and Queen Elizabeth. Amongst these many new trees and woodlands, it is hoped that 60 sites, each of at least 60 acres (24 Hectares), will be found, that will be known as 'Diamond Woods'. Each will get a package of advice and practical help in planting and establishing the new trees.

== Flagship Diamond ==
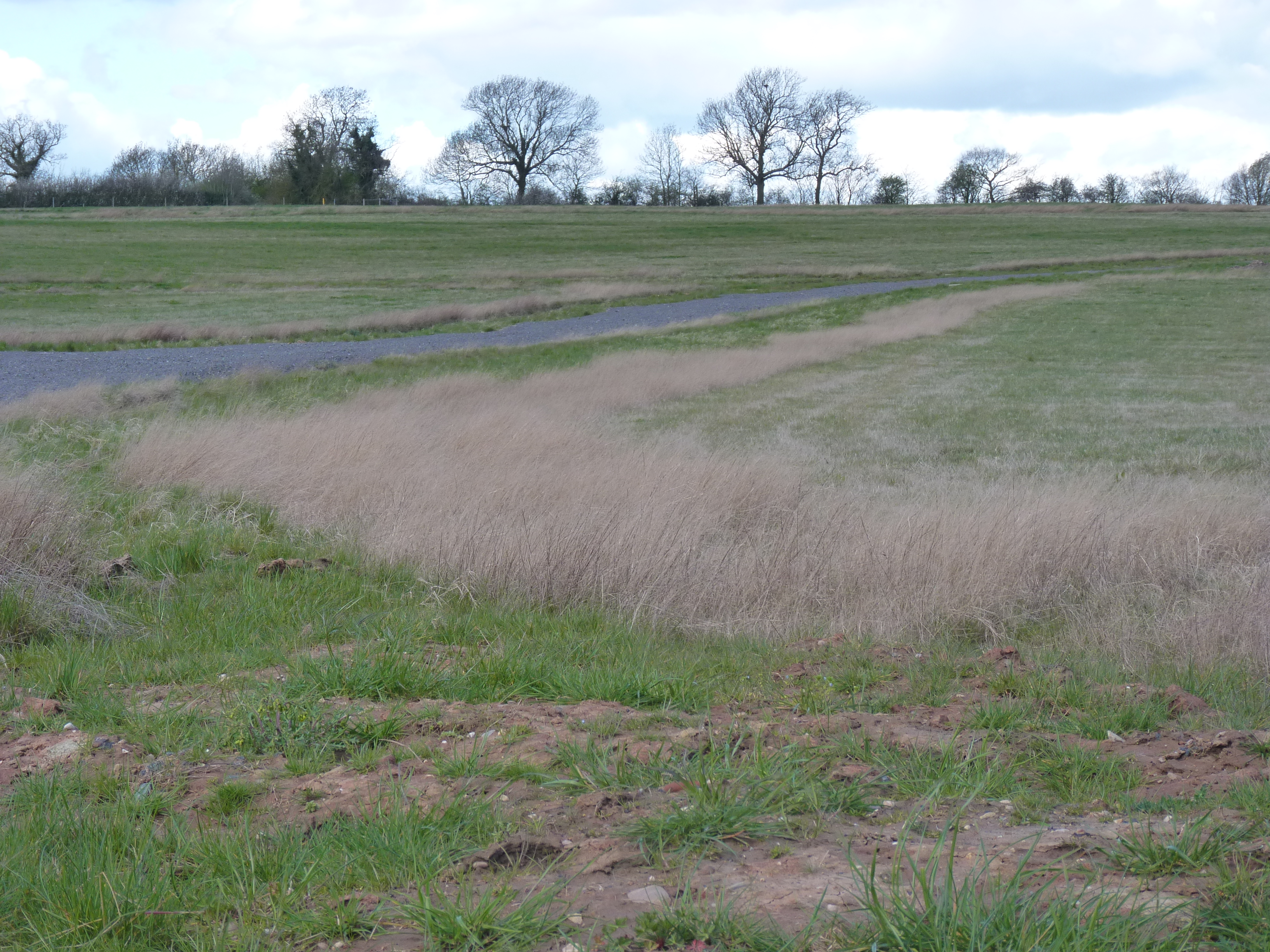
The distant hedgerow is one of a number of ancient hedges and trackways that cross the new woodland site.

The only Diamond Wood owned and managed by the Woodland Trust itself is the 'Queen Elizabeth Diamond Jubilee Wood' in Leicestershire. The process of acquiring the site was complex, as it could only work if all the landowners could agree on the sale, and all the funding could also be put in place. A key element was the 188 acres (76 ha) area of former opencast coal mine, which had belonged to UK Coal, who had been in the process of re-instating the land. Over a three-year period from 2007 to 2010 725,000 tons of coal had been extracted from the site known as Long Moor surface mine. The need to juggle sitting tenants, mineral rights, and multiple landowners meant that although the plans had been announced in September 2011 it was March 2012 before the final go-ahead was announced.

The final designs for the new woodland was unveiled on 1 June 2012 at a celebration picnic on the site. It will include planting 300,000 new native trees. Oak, ash, field maple, silver birch, beech and hornbeam will be included in the woodland. It became the largest expanse of woodland under a single ownership within the National Forest.

== See also ==
- Woodland Trust
- National Forest, England
