= Susan Bell (forester) =

British planner and forester

The site of the National Forest (England)

Susan Bell (OBE) is a British journalist, town and country planner, land use adviser to the Country Landowners' Association, and forester, who was tasked with the early development work for The National Forest (England), the first major forest to be planted in Britain for nearly 1,000 years. She then became the first chief executive of the National Forest Company, which runs the initiative. She is notable for her establishment of working relationships with landowners, mineral extractors, public, private and voluntary organisations to establish a large, multi purpose, working woodland in an area previously economically depressed and environmentally despoiled. After retiring, she was invited to witness the planting of the ten millionth tree in the forest.

== Career ==
Bell trained as a journalist. In the early 1970s, she qualified as a town and country planner, with an emphasis on rural policy. She then worked in private practice as a planner and as an environmental consultant. In 1980, she joined the Country Landowners Association (now the Country Land & Business Association) as their Land Use Adviser. She worked on conservation, forestry, public access and the rural economy. In 1991, she was appointed to lead a small Development Team to draw up a strategy and business plan for the creation of an innovative new diverse forest in the Midlands. The team was to gain support by setting up working partnerships with landowners, businesses, public, private and voluntary organisations, mineral extractors and local communities for England's new 200 square mile multi-purpose National Forest. in the Midlands. In 1995, Bell became the first chief executive of the Government-backed National Forest Company. The vision for the forest included not only the planting of massive areas of woodland but also the development of tourism, the return of traditional skills such as furniture making, coppicing and charcoal burning, economic regeneration and the return of community optimism after decades of decline in the coal mining industry, the loss of 10,000 jobs and the spoiling of the environment. After ten years, the area of woodland had greatly expanded, a new discovery centre, Conkers. was attracting thousands of visitors, the Ashby Canal had been restored, a new marina was under construction and both new housing, and new commercial development were emerging in a steadily growing woodland setting. After some time, studies were commissioned to determine the effects that the new forest was having on the lives and welfare of those who live and work there and on visitors. Bell retired in 2006. In 2026 she was invited to attend the planting of the ten millionth tree in the forest.

== Awards ==
In 1999, Bell was awarded an OBE for services to forestry. In 2007, Bell received the Pater Savill award for her significant contribution to the British forest industry.
