= Charter of the Forest =

English charter of 1217

- Act of Parliament
- Parliament of England
- Long title: Carta de Foresta
- Citation: 25 Edw. 1
- Territorial extent: England and Wales; Ireland

Dates
- Royal assent: 1297
- Repealed: 1 July 1971
Other legislation
Amended by	Criminal Statutes Repeal Act 1827; Criminal Statutes (Ireland) Repeal Act 1828; Criminal Law (India) Act 1828
Repealed by	Wild Creatures and Forest Laws Act 1971
Relates to	Magna Carta (1297); Confirmation of the Charters (1297); A Statute Concerning Tallage (1297)

Status: Repealed

Text of statute as originally enacted

Text of the A Statute Concerning Tallage (1297) as in force today (including any amendments) within the United Kingdom, from legislation.gov.uk.

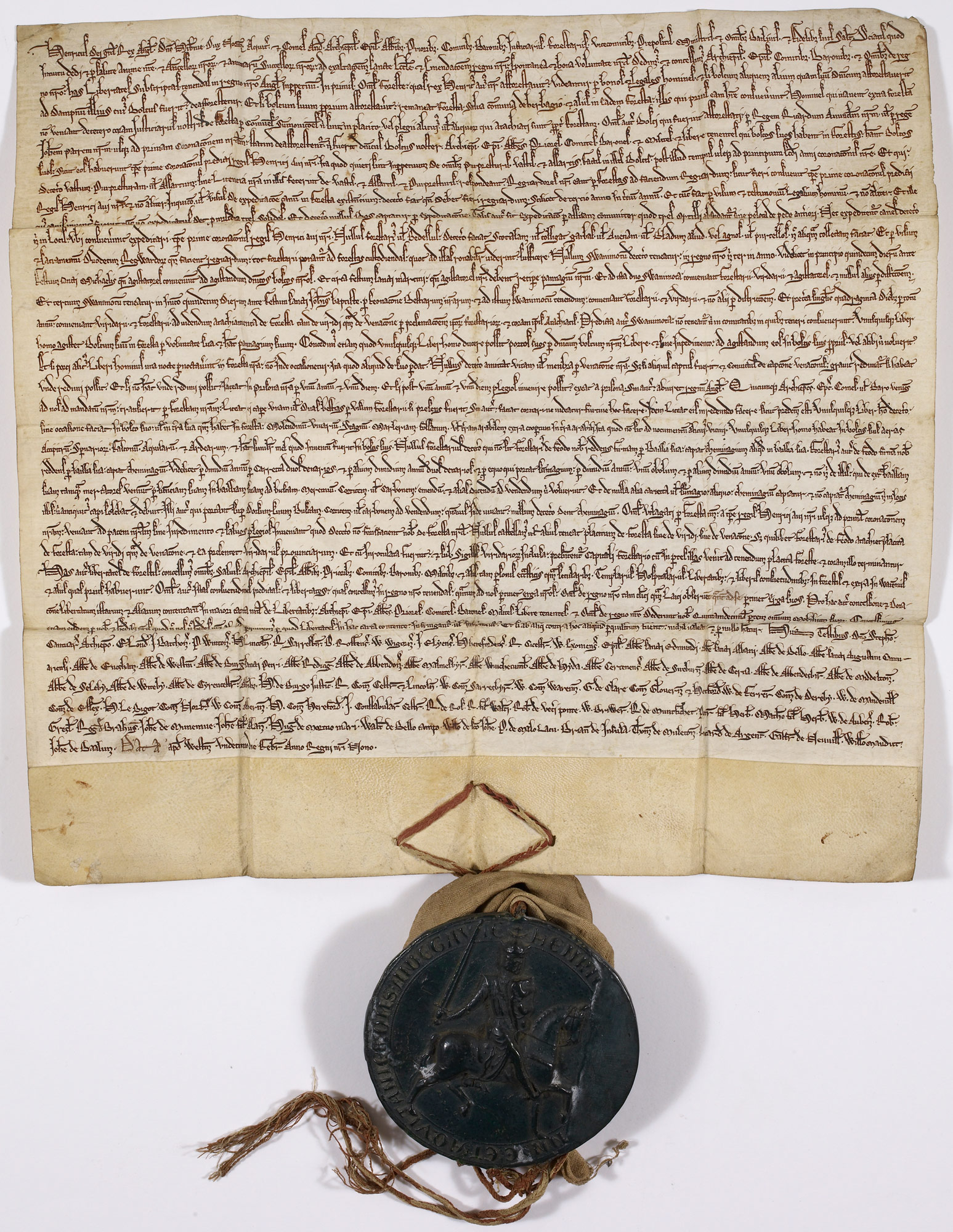
The Charter of the Forest, 1225 reissue, held by the British Library

The Charter of the Forest of 1217 re-established rights of access for free men to the royal forest that had been eroded by King William the Conqueror and his heirs. Many of its provisions were in force for centuries afterwards. It was originally sealed in England by the young King Henry III, acting under the regency of William Marshal, 1st Earl of Pembroke.

It was in many ways a companion document to Magna Carta. The charter redressed some applications of the Anglo-Norman Forest Law that had been extended and abused by King William Rufus.

== History ==
"Forest" to the Normans meant an enclosed area where the monarch, or sometimes another aristocrat, had exclusive rights to animals of the chase and the greenery ("vert") on which they fed. It consisted not only of trees but also large areas of commons such as heathland, grassland, and wetlands, productive of food, grazing, and other resources.

Lands became more restricted as King Richard and King John designated increasing areas as royal forest, off-limits to commoners. At its widest extent, royal forest covered about one-third of the land of southern England. Thus, it became an increasing hardship for the common people to try to farm, forage, and otherwise use the land they lived on.

The Charter of the Forest was first issued on 6 November 1217 at Old St Paul's Cathedral in London as a complementary charter to Magna Carta from which it had evolved. It was reissued in 1225 with several minor changes to wording, but cancelled in 1227 when Henry III declared his adulthood. It was joined with Magna Carta in the Confirmation of Charters in 1297.

During a period when royal forests were critical sources of fuel and resources supporting rights such as pannage (pig pasture), estover (firewood collection), agistment (grazing), and turbary (turf cutting), this charter established specific economic protections for free men regarding foraging and livestock grazing.

In contrast to Magna Carta, which dealt with the rights of barons, it restored to the commoner some fundamental rights, privileges, and protections against the abuses of an encroaching aristocracy. For many years it was regarded as a development of great significance in England's constitutional history, with the seventeenth-century jurist Sir Edward Coke referring to it along with Magna Carta as the Charters of England's Liberties, and Sir William Blackstone remarking in the eighteenth century that:

There is no transaction in the antient part of our English history more interesting and important, than … the charters of liberties, emphatically stiled THE GREAT CHARTER and CHARTER OF THE FOREST …

== Contents ==
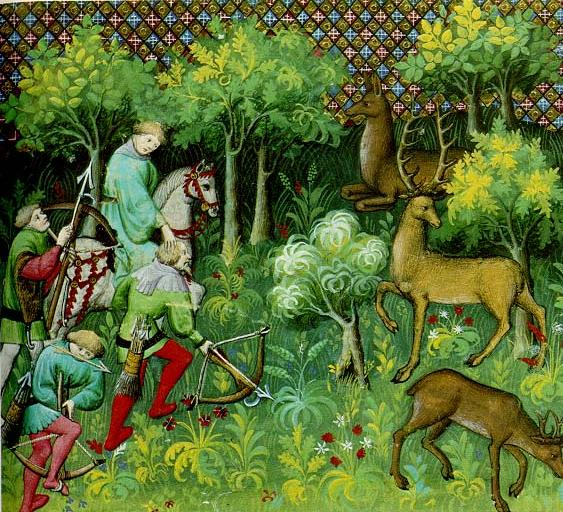
A medieval forest, from Livre de chasse (1387) by Gaston III, Count of Foix.

The first chapter of the charter protected common pasture in the forest for all those "accustomed to it", and chapter nine provided for "every man to agist his wood in the forest as he wishes". It added "Henceforth every freeman, in his wood or on his land that he has in the forest, may with impunity make a mill, fish-preserve, pond, marl-pit, ditch, or arable in cultivated land outside coverts, provided that no injury is thereby given to any neighbour." The charter restored the area classified as "forest" to that of Henry II's time.

Clause 10 repealed the death penalty (and mutilation as a lesser punishment) for capturing deer (venison), though transgressors were still subject to fines or imprisonment. Special verderers' courts were set up within the forests to enforce the laws of the charter.

== Development ==
By Tudor times, most of the laws served mainly to protect the timber in royal forests. Some clauses in the Laws of Forests remained in force until the 1970s. The special courts still exist in the New Forest and the Forest of Dean. In this respect, the charter was the statute that remained longest in force in England, from 1217 until superseded by the Wild Creatures and Forest Laws Act 1971.

The whole act, so far as unrepealed, was repealed by section 1(4) of, and the schedule to, the Wild Creatures and Forest Laws Act 1971, which came into force on 1 July 1971.

The charter was a vehicle for asserting the values of the commons and the right of commoners against the state and the forces of commodification. The act that replaced it was about the protection of nature and administering the commodification of natural resources.

To mark 800 years of the Charter of the Forest, in 2017, the Woodland Trust and more than 50 other cross-sector organisations joined forces to create and launch a Charter for Trees, Woods and People, reflecting the modern relationship with trees and woods in the landscape for people in the UK.

== Significance ==
According to Guy Standing, the charter "was not about the rights of the poor, but about the rights of the free. For its time and place, it was a radical assertion of the universality of freedom, its commonality."

== Surviving copies ==
=== 1217 edition ===
It is claimed that only two copies of the 1217 Charter of the Forest survive, belonging to Durham Cathedral and Lincoln Cathedral. The Lincoln copy is usually on display in the David P J Ross Magna Carta Vault in Lincoln Castle, together with the Lincoln copy of Magna Carta.

=== 1225 edition ===
A manuscript of the 1225 reissue narrowly escaped destruction in 1865 and is now available in the British Library (Add. Ch. 24712).

=== 1300 edition ===
A recently discovered copy of the 1300 edition of the Charter of the Forest is in Sandwich Guildhall Museum (paired with a copy of the Magna Carta). Another copy of the 1300 edition of the Charter of the Forest belongs to Oriel College (again with a copy of the Magna Carta).

== In popular culture ==
The charter has inspired the name of the Read-Opera The Charter of the Forest, which deals with themes such as free people's relation to power, which were codified in one form by the original Charter of the Forest.

== See also ==
- English land law
- Forestry in the United Kingdom

== Bibliography ==
- GC Homans, English Villagers of the Thirteenth Century (1941)
- H Rothwell, English Historical Documents 1189–1327 (1995)
- P. Linebaugh, The Magna Charta Manifesto (2008)
