= Wildlife and Countryside Link =

Conservation coalition in England

- Formation: 1990
- Type: Conservation charity
- Headquarters: London
- Region served: England
- Key people: Martin Spray CBE (Chairman); Richard Benwell (Chief Executive)
- Website: wcl.org.uk

Wildlife and Countryside Link (or simply "Link") is the largest environment and wildlife coalition in England, bringing together voluntary organisations to protect wildlife, restore landscapes and the marine environment, and improve access to nature.

Link currently has 88 members who collectively employ 9,600 full-time staff, have the help of 174,000 volunteers and the support of over 8 million people in the UK. Link's members are united by their common interest in the conservation of the natural environment and together are responsible for the direct protection of over 750,000 hectares of land and 800 miles of coastline.

== History ==
Link began life as Wildlife Link in 1980, taking over from two existing umbrella bodies, the Council for Nature and the Council for Environmental Conservation. The formation of Link was driven by Lord Peter Melchett whose position in the House of Lords convinced him that better co-ordination was needed between voluntary organisations with similar core objectives. In 1982 Countryside Link was formed to look after the interests of the countryside and in 1990 the two organisations merged, thus creating the organisation of today, whose interests span the breadth of wildlife and countryside issues.

== Aims ==
Wildlife and Countryside Link works to promote the conservation and protection of wildlife and countryside for the benefit of the public. The organisation aims "to secure and shape a healthy, enhanced and accessible natural world" through the development of policy, the amplification of member voices and by creating relationships between the environmental sector and policy-makers.

Link aims to maximise the efficiency and effectiveness of the environmental voluntary sector through collaboration. By bringing members together on policy areas of interest to them, it provides a forum to develop a collective view on national and international issues affecting nature.

== Activities ==
As a coalition organisation, Link works with its members to develop and advocate proposals for improvements in law and policy for the benefit of wildlife and our environment. The Link Secretariat coordinates a number of policy subgroups, including Agriculture, Animal Welfare, Water Policy, Invasive Species, EDI, Land Use and Planning, Marine, Marine Mammals, Nature Policy, Wellbeing, Resources and Waste and Wildlife Crime. Through these subgroups Link develops Link develops policy papers, briefings and annual reports include its Wildlife Crime Report, 30x30 in England Progress Report and Global Biodiversity Framework Tracker.

Link also provides an information management service helping members to share resources and intelligence. By acting as a hub through which information can be exchanged, Link enables members to network with other organisations with similar interests and keeps them informed of developments across a range of topics.

Wildlife and Countryside Link also delivers focused campaigns, media and advocacy messages which support its policy work and works with politicians in Westminster to highlight issues and concerns raised by its members. For example, in a 2024 report submitted to MPs in an all-party parliamentary group (APPG) for Race and Community, Link made the claim that the British countryside has been influenced by "racist colonial legacies" which have created an environment some fear is "dominated by white people".

== Structure ==
Governance

Link is led by a Board of Trustees and is a registered charity and a company limited by guarantee registered in England and Wales. The current Chair of the Board of Trustees is Martin Spray CBE, who has held the position since 2018.

The organisation is run through a small Secretariat team. The current Chief Executive of Link is Dr Richard Benwell. The Link Secretariat coordinates groups of experts in Working Groups and facilitates coalition working through these groups with the help of elected Chairs and Vice-Chairs. The Link Secretariat are also responsible for communications, media and campaigns work undertaken by the coalition.

Members

As of April 2025, 88 groups were members of Link:

- A Rocha UK
- ALERC
- Amphibian and Reptile Conservation
- Angling Trust (partner)
- Animal Welfare Institute (partner)
- Badger Trust
- Badger Conservation Trust
- Bat Conservation Trust
- Beaver Trust
- Blue Marine Foundation
- British Ecological Society
- Born Free Foundation
- BHPS - The Hedgehog Conservation Charity
- British Trust for Ornithology
- British Mountaineering Council
- Buglife - The Invertebrate Conservation Trust
- Bumblebee Conservation Trust
- Butterfly Conservation
- Campaign for National Parks
- CET Law
- CHEMTrust
- Chester Zoo
- Chartered Institute of Ecology and Environmental Management
- CPRE
- ClientEarth
- Compassion in World Farming
- Council for British Archaeology
- Earth Trust
- Earth Watch Institute
- Environmental Investigation Agency
- Fidra
- Four Paws UK
- Forest Stewardship Council
- Floodplain Meadows Partnership
- Freshwater Habitats Trust (formerly Pond Conservation)
- Friends of the Earth
- Froglife
- Forest Stewardship Council UK
- Greenpeace
- Hare Preservation Trust
- Humane Society International/UK
- Institute of Fisheries Management
- International Fund for Animal Welfare
- John Muir Trust
- Keep Britain Tidy
- League Against Cruel Sports
- The Mammal Society
- Marine Conservation Society
- MARINElife
- National Forum for Biological Recording
- National Trust
- Natural Resources Defense Council
- Naturewatch Foundation
- Oceana (non-profit group)
- Open Spaces Society
- ORCA
- Paddle UK
- People's Trust for Endangered Species
- Planet Patrol
- Plantlife
- Ramblers
- Rare Breeds Survival Trust
- Rewilding Britain
- River Action
- The River Restoration Centre
- The Rivers Trust (formerly the Association of Rivers Trusts)
- Royal Society for the Protection of Birds
- Royal Society for the Prevention of Cruelty to Animals
- Cornwall Seal Group Research Trust
- Shark Trust
- Soil Association
- Surfers Against Sewage
- Sustainability First
- Sustainable Soils Alliance
- The Conservation Volunteers
- Trees for Cities
- Waterwise (partner)
- Whale and Dolphin Conservation Society
- Wild Justice
- Wild Fish
- WWT
- Wildlife Gardening Forum
- The Wildlife Trusts
- Woodland Trust
- World Wide Fund for Nature
- Youth Hostels Association (England & Wales)
- Zoological Society of London

Joint Links

Wildlife and Countryside Link operates in England and is based in London. It focuses its efforts on influencing Westminster and Whitehall. As the environment is a devolved matter, there are other Links in each of the devolved administrations:

- Northern Ireland Environment Link
- Wales Environment Link
- Scottish Environment Link

== Funding ==
Link's members provide financial support to the organisation through an annual subscription and voluntary donations. Financial support is also received from Natural England, the Esmée Fairbairn Foundation, and a number of other charitable trusts.
