= Staunton Harold Reservoir =

Lake in the United Kingdom

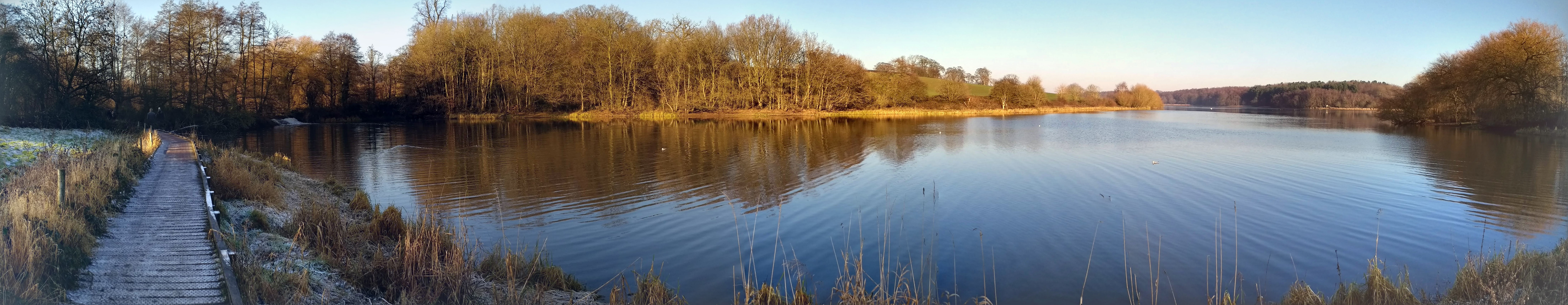
- Staunton Harold Reservoir Panorama taken from the South West of the reservoir

- Location within Derbyshire
- Location: South Derbyshire, North West Leicestershire
- Coordinates: 52.811°N 1.441°W
- Type: reservoir
- Primary inflows: River Dove
- Primary outflows: Melbourne water treatment works
- Basin countries: United Kingdom
- Surface area: 209 acres (85 ha)
- Average depth: 25 m (82 ft)
- Water volume: 1,400 million imperial gallons (6,400 ML; 5,200 acre⋅ft)

Staunton Harold Reservoir is a large reservoir under the management of Severn Trent Water, located between Melbourne and Ticknall in Derbyshire, England. Most of the water is within Derbyshire but a small part of the southern shore is over the border in Leicestershire. The site is also the home of Staunton Harold Sailing Club.

The reservoir was built in 1964 at the behest of the River Dove Water Board, meant to serve Leicester and the towns of northern Leicestershire. Although no villages were lost in the construction of the reservoir, Furnace Farm, New England Farm and Calke Mill were submerged; their remains lie 25 metres below the surface. The dam wall is a clay core construction, similar to the dam wall at Ladybower Reservoir. Part of the shoreline border the Calke Abbey estate, as well as the National Forest. The reservoir has a total surface area of 209 acres (0.85 km^{2}).

Staunton Harold hosts a natural habitat for much bird and plant life, and is also home to Dimmingsdale Nature Reserve. There is also a sailing club, a visitors' centre and a children's adventure playground available to visitors. A non-functioning windmill dominates the skyline close to the visitors' centre called Tower Windmill, built in 1797 by the first Lord Melbourne at a cost of £250. Since July 2022, Severn Trent has been working with the National Trust to manage this site.
