= Forest of Mercia =

Coordinates: 52.6617°N 1.9427°W

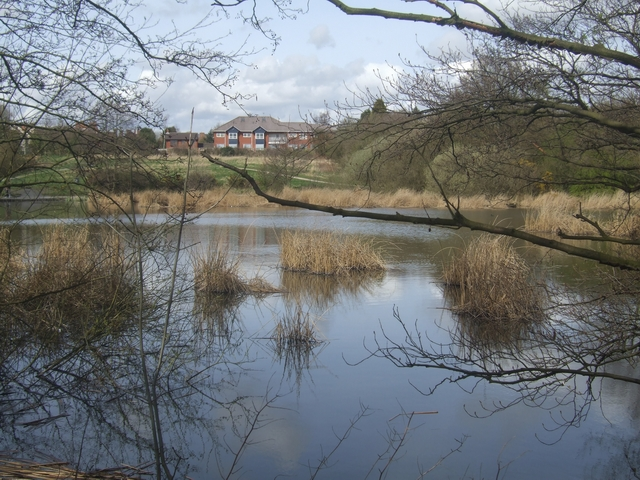
Fishing pool in the Forest of Mercia

The Forest of Mercia lies within the northernmost boundary of the more ancient and well-known Forest of Arden which covered the area when it formed part of the Kingdom of Mercia, and is one of twelve community forests established close to major towns and cities across England. It covers an area of 92 square miles (23,000 hectares), and is focused around the town of Cannock in South Staffordshire.

== History ==
Community forests are part of an environmental improvement programme set up in 1990 by the Countryside Commission, and operated by local partnerships that include local communities, local councils, Natural England and the Forestry Commission. They were set up to help regenerate communities, renew established woodland areas by planting new trees, improving green spaces and creating new walkways and cycle paths.

In the Forest of Mercia's case, the partnership includes Lichfield District Council, South Staffordshire Council, Staffordshire County Council and Walsall Metropolitan Borough Council, and the forest is managed from a purpose built Innovation Centre at Chasewater, near Burntwood.
