= The National Forest (England) =

Environmental project in central England

The National Forest is an environmental project in central England run by The National Forest Company. From the 1990s, 200 square miles (520 km^{2}) of north Leicestershire, south Derbyshire and southeast Staffordshire have been planted in an attempt to blend ancient woodland with newly planted areas to create a new national forest. It stretches from the western outskirts of Leicester in the east to Burton upon Trent in the west, and is planned to link the ancient forests of Needwood and Charnwood.

== The National Forest Company ==
Location of the national forest.

The National Forest Company is a not-for-profit organisation established in April 1995 as a company limited by guarantee with Susan Bell (forester) as its first chief executive. It is supported by the Department for Environment, Food and Rural Affairs (Defra), with the aim of converting one third of the land within the boundaries of the National Forest to woodland, by encouraging landowners to alter their land use. It is described as "a forest in the making" and it is hoped to increase tourism and forestry-related jobs in the area.

More than ten million trees have been planted, more than tripling the woodland cover from 6% to over 26%.

== Planting ==
Approximately 85% of the trees planted are native broadleaf species. The most commonly planted species include: English oak, ash, poplar, Corsican pine and Scots pine. Between 1991 and 2024, 9.5 million trees were planted.

The transformation of the landscape is taking effect as the first tiny whips planted in the early 1990s are growing into substantial trees.

== Attractions ==
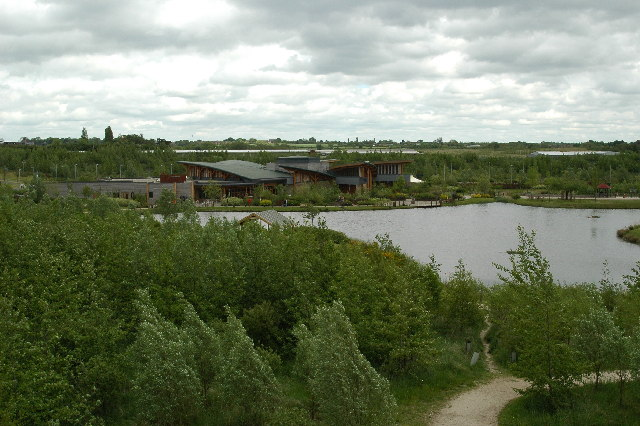
Conkers Discovery Centre at Moira, Leicestershire, in the heart of the National Forest (May 2005)

At the centre of the National Forest is Conkers, a visitor centre located just outside the village of Moira, Leicestershire. There is also a visitor centre with wildlife walks and playgrounds at Rosliston.

Other attractions include:

- Ashby Canal
- Ashby Castle, Ashby-de-la-Zouch
- Ashby de-la-Zouch museum, Ashby de-la-Zouch
- Bardon Hill - highest point in the National Forest at 912 feet (278 m) above sea level
- Battlefield Line Railway
- Beacon Hill, Leicestershire
- Bradgate Park
- Calke Abbey, Ticknall
- Claymills Victorian Pumping Station
- Croxall Lakes
- Donington le Heath Manor House
- Flagship Diamond Wood
- Foremark Reservoir, Foremark
- Fradley Junction
- Grace Dieu Priory
- Kedleston Hall
- Loughborough Outwoods
- Melbourne Hall
- Moira Furnace
- Mount St. Bernard Abbey
- National Memorial Arboretum
- Rosliston Forestry Centre
- Seale Wood
- Sence Valley Forest Park
- Sharpe's Pottery Museum
- Staunton Harold Reservoir
- Sudbury Hall
- Swithland Wood
- The National Forest Maze
- T.G.Green Cornishware Archive Museum
- Thornton Reservoir
- Tropical Birdland, Leicestershire
- Twycross Zoo

The towns of Ashby de la Zouch, Burton upon Trent, Swadlincote and Coalville are located within the forest area.

The Ordnance Survey Explorer double-sided map 245 is named "The National Forest", and includes the above-named places.

== See also ==
- Reforestation
- Plant A Tree In '73
- Sherwood Forest
- Great Northumberland Forest
- Northern Forest (England)
