= Mersey Forest =

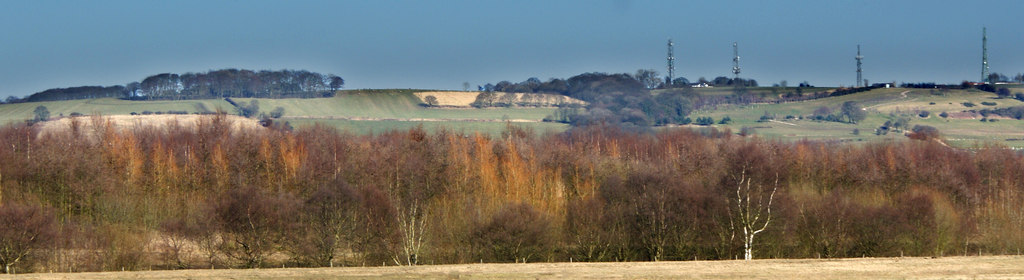
- Looking across the Mersey Forest towards Billinge Hill

- Location within Merseyside

Geography
- Location: Merseyside/Cheshire, North West England, England
- Coordinates: 53°22′N 2°48′W

Administration
- Status: Community Forest
- Established: 1991, Forest Plan approved 1994
- Website: www.merseyforest.org.uk

Ecology
- Forest cover: 10.6%
- Dominant tree species: Mainly Lowland Mixed Broadleaves

The Mersey Forest is a network of woodlands and green spaces being created across Merseyside and North Cheshire by a wide-ranging partnership of different organisations including local authorities, community groups and businesses. The Mersey Forest is the biggest of twelve community forests covering 420 square miles (1,100 km^{2}) and accessible to a local population of 1.6 million people. It stretches from Sefton to the north of Liverpool and south to Northwich in Cheshire. Delamere Forest in the south of the area being the largest area of established woodland. The forest is seen as having a major role in attracting new business and tourism to the area.

In common with the other community forests, it is not a contiguous area of forest, but rather an initiative to increase forestry coverage in an area close to urban communities. An example of this at work is Griffin Wood, clearly visible from the M62 just to the south of St. Helens. This woodland was established in 2007, including Scott's Copse, planted in recognition of the work done by David Scott. It is one of the areas where trees were planted by Team Trees.

The forest falls within the area of the proposed Northern Forest.
