= Trees for Cities =

British charity

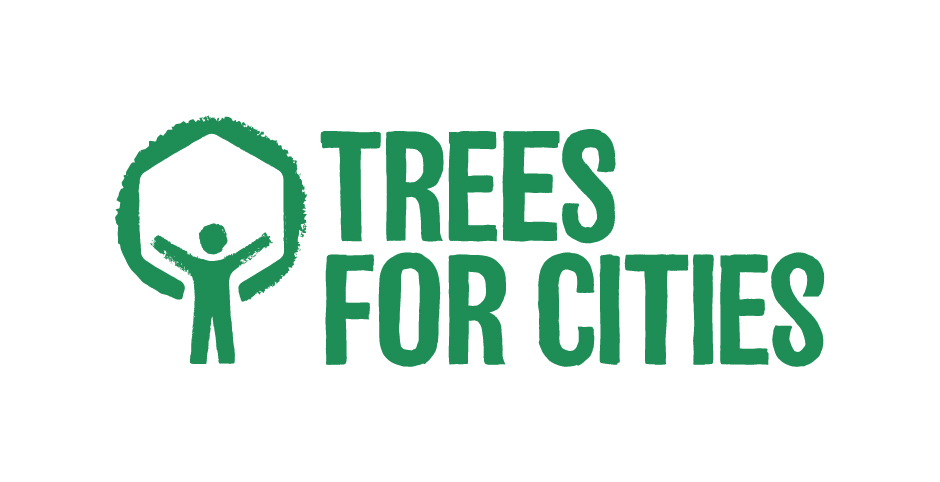

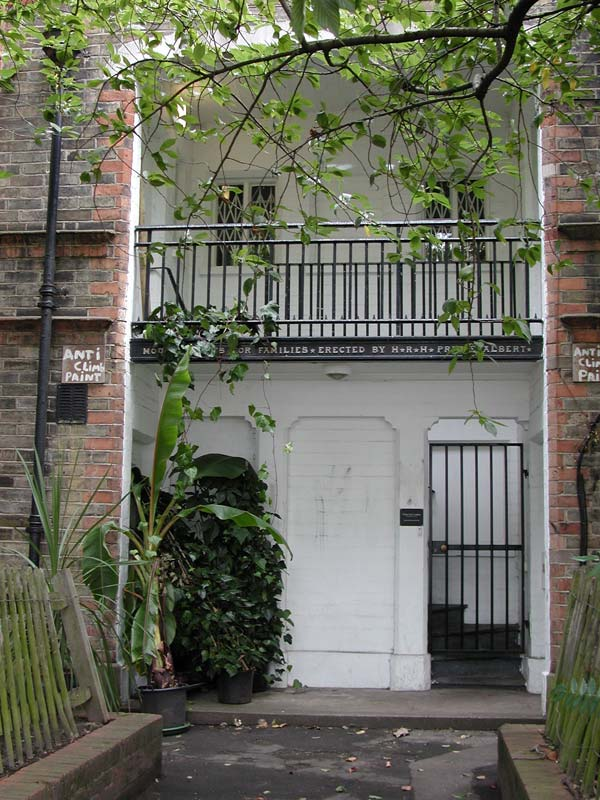
- The organisation's headquarters at Prince Consort Lodge in Kennington, London SE11
- Formation: 1993
- Legal status: Non-profit company and registered charity
- Purpose: Create greener cities
- Region served: UK, world
- Chief Executive: Kate Sheldon
- Main organ: Board of Trustees
- Website: www.treesforcities.org

Trees for Cities is a UK charity which empowers people to plant and establish trees in urban areas. Since 1993, the organisation has engaged over 260,000 people to plant over 1,900,000 urban trees in parks, streets, woodlands, schools, hospitals and housing estates.

The charity also runs the Edible Playgrounds programme, which inspires school children to grow and eat healthy food.

== History ==
Trees for Cities was founded in 1993 by a group of four friends: Jake Kempston, Belinda Winder, Jane Bruton and Julian Blake. For the first five or so years, the charity raised funds through its well-known parties. The charity was initially called Trees for London with the charitable objectives to "advance the education of the public in the appreciation of trees and their amenity value, and in furtherance of this the planting and protection of trees everywhere, and in particular inner city areas". In 2003, the charity changed its name to Trees for Cities to reflect a growth in activities in cities across the UK and across the globe.

In 2009, Sharon Johnson replaced Graham Simmonds as Chief Executive. She was succeeded as Chief Executive by David J. Elliott in 2016, who was then succeeded by Kate Sheldon in 2023.

The charity has a history of unusual office locations. Originally based on HMS Belfast, the charity now operates from Prince Consort Lodge, a Grade II listed building located in Kennington Park, Kennington, in the London Borough of Lambeth, England. It also has offices in Whitacre Mews, Kennington, London.

== Function ==
In addition to tree planting, the charity is involved in activities with schools and community groups and undertakes campaigning.

=== Urban Forests ===
Trees for Cities' work focuses on planting trees and greening community spaces where the social and environmental impact on local people is greatest. By engaging volunteers to plant and establish thousands of urban trees worldwide each year, the organisation is building resilience against threats facing the natural environment. Planting a range of tree species in urban areas have multiple impacts and benefits to people and the environment such as improving physical and mental wellbeing, absorbing air pollutants, sequestering carbon, masking noise, preventing flooding etc.

The charity planted its millionth urban tree in 2019 with Sir Michael Palin.

In 2018, it played an active role in the campaign to stop the felling of Sheffield's street trees.

=== Edible Playgrounds ===
Edible Playgrounds transform areas in school grounds into vibrant outdoor spaces that excite and teach children about growing and eating healthy food. By instilling healthy eating habits at an early age, Edible Playgrounds can help to tackle obesity, food poverty and lack of access to nature head on, as well as providing a platform for fun and engaging lessons that support the school curriculum. Independent research among participating schools shows that 72% of schools said that children were more likely to choose fruits over less healthy snacks while 94% of schools said that pupils had improved attitudes towards healthy living. Trees for Cities has worked with 100 schools in 12 towns and cities to build bespoke edible gardens over the past 10 years.

=== Planting Healthy Air in Schools ===
Planting Healthy Air in Schools has been developed to address London's poor air quality and the detrimental health effects this has on people, especially children. London's trees remove 2,241 tons of pollution per year, making them a particularly effective barrier to the flow of toxic air. The charity is currently working in partnership with St Paul's CE Primary, named the second most polluted school in London, to enrich the grounds through tree planting and greening in order to enhance the natural environment and promote the use of the outdoor space for pupils.

=== International ===
The charity works with local organisations and community groups around the world to focus their tree planting projects on delivering long-term, practical solutions to green polluted city environments and provide local people with the skills and ability to secure sustainable livelihoods. Since 2006 they have planted over 200,000 trees in 16 cities in 13 countries – from Ica in Peru to Nairobi in Kenya and Pokhara in Nepal.

== Fundraising ==
Trees for Cities has a number of high-profile patrons, including Jamie Oliver, Jon Snow and Richard Rogers. The charity was responsible for the Tree-athlon, a 5k annual fun run, held in Leeds, Manchester and London. In Battersea Park on 18 September 2010, it set the world record for the largest ever barefoot race, with 278 participants completing a 100m grass circuit. The charity sends out a monthly newsletter to its followers, titled Tree Times.

== Projects ==
Trees for Cities has projects throughout Greater London, and has delivered projects in 100 towns and cities, predominantly across the UK. The charity's global reach has extended to Ica in Peru, La Paz in Bolivia, Nairobi in Kenya and Addis Ababa in Ethiopia.

== See also ==
- The Big Tree Plant
- Plant A Tree In '73
- Great Trees of London, a list created by Trees for Cities after the Great Storm of 1987
