= Northern Forest (England) =

Proposed forestry area in Northern England

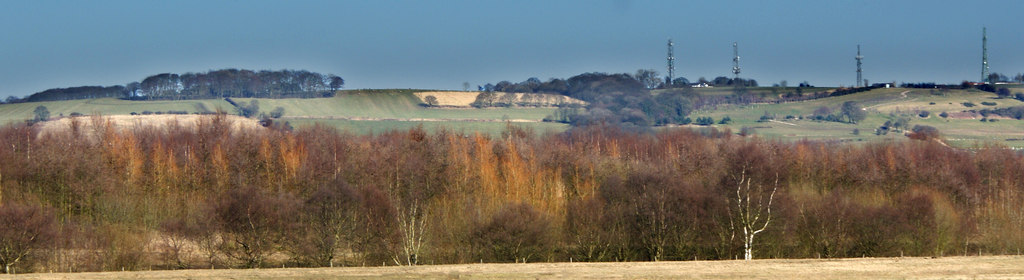
- Existing woodland near Rainford (part of the Mersey Forest)

- Location within England

Geography
- Location: England
- Coordinates: 53°46′29.9″N 1°33′22.9″W

Administration
- Status: Proposed
- Website: thenorthernforest.org.uk

The Northern Forest is a partnership in England between five of England's Community Forests, (the Mersey Forest, the White Rose Forest, City of Trees, and Humber Forest), the Woodland Trust and the Community Forest Trust. The aim is to plant 50 million trees between Liverpool and the Yorkshire coast for the benefit of nature and communities. Initial funding for the project was granted by the UK government in January 2018.

== Aims ==
Planting in the Northern Forest partnership area would run the whole width of England from Liverpool and Chester in the west to the coastline of the East Riding of Yorkshire including the cities of Manchester, Leeds, Sheffield and Hull. The aim is to plant 50 million trees in the 25 years between 2017 and 2042, a trebling of current planting rates in the area; this would increase the rate of reforestation in England, which is at record low rates and may currently be outweighed by the rate of deforestation for the first time in decades. The area currently has less than 8% tree coverage, one of the lowest proportions in the country.

The scheme was developed as an environmental counterpart to the government's Northern Powerhouse strategy. The trees proposed are a mix of native and non-native broad leaf trees and high-yield coniferous trees. The forest would provide timber and biomass for industry as well as a leisure resource, reduce flood risk and improve air and water quality. It is hoped that a market for timber could be found in the biomass power stations in the M62 motorway corridor, which generate up to 10% of the UK's electricity and require up to 10 million tonnes of fuel per year.

The initial planting will be close to the cities, with an aim to increase coverage in this area to 20%. The next priority would be river valleys where reforestation will reduce flood risk. The more remote portions would be planted towards the end of the 25-year programme.

== Funding ==
The cost of the project has been estimated at £500 million, whilst economic benefits are estimated at over £2.5 billion. The UK government granted initial funding of £5.7 million to the project in January 2018.

There is hope that mitigation funding from infrastructure projects such as the extension of the High Speed 2 rail scheme and major road schemes will be made available in the future. It is also hoped that there may be funding as agricultural subsidies are redirected after Brexit.

== See also ==
- Great Northumberland Forest
- The National Forest (England)
- Western Forest
