= Plant A Tree In '73 =

UK government-sponsored campaign to encourage tree planting in 1973

Plant A Tree In '73 was a Government-sponsored national campaign in the United Kingdom, aimed at encouraging the population to participate by planting trees during the 1973 'National Tree Planting Year'. At the time a new, virulent strain of Dutch elm disease was sweeping the country, killing millions of trees.

== The campaign ==
The campaign was instigated by Member of Parliament Sydney Chapman. He formally proposed the idea in a parliamentary question to Peter Walker, the Secretary of State for the Environment on 28 July 1971, who announced his backing on 1 March 1972. As a result, a committee was set up to run the campaign, chaired by Lord Sandford.

Many organisations, including local authorities, youth organisations, schools, businesses and communities supported the campaign by planting or donating trees, or making land available. The Forestry Commission donated some 90,000 trees to schools and a further 70,000 for joint projects with local authorities, as did other organisations including the Crown Estate Commissioners. The Royal Mail also marked the campaign by issuing a 9p commemorative stamp, first issued on 28 February 1973.

There was also a campaign under the same name in South Africa. The slogan was "Plant a tree in '73, plant one more in '74".

In Britain, a popular sarcastic saying was "Plant a tree in '73, buy a saw in '74". This featured in the BBC radio comedy series I'm Sorry I'll Read That Again, but may have originated elsewhere.

== Aftermath ==
In the wake of the campaign, The Tree Council was founded in 1974 to act as an umbrella organisation for local groups involved in the planting, care and conservation of trees throughout the United Kingdom. From its foundation through to 2007 it estimated that over 20 million trees have been planted during the annual National Tree Weeks.

== See also ==
- The Big Tree Plant – a similar campaign launched in December 2010
- Great Storm of 1987
- Tree planting
