= Protected areas of the United Kingdom =

Designated area for protection in the United Kingdom

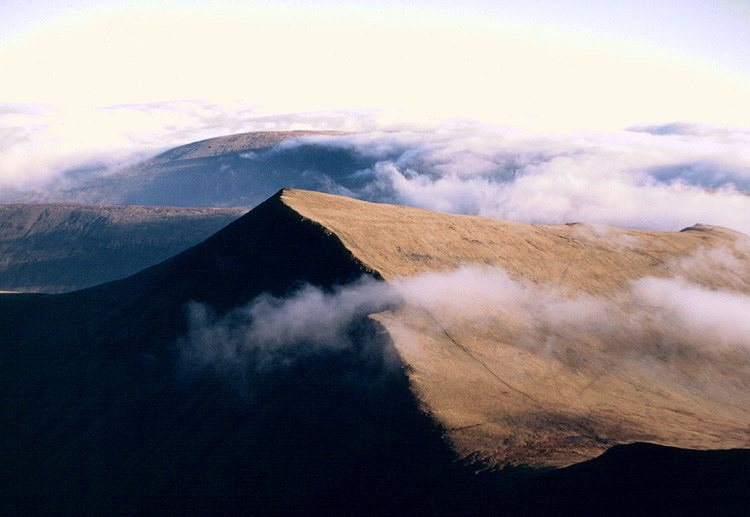
Part of the Brecon Beacons National Park, looking from the highest point of Pen y Fan (886 m/2907 feet) to Cribyn (795 m/2608 feet).

Protected areas of the United Kingdom are areas in the United Kingdom which need and /or receive protection because of their environmental, historical or cultural value to the nation. Methods and aims of protection vary depending on the nature and importance of the resource. Protection operates at local, regional, national and international levels, and may be backed by legislation and international treaty, or less formally by planning policy.

Within the United Kingdom, different approaches are taken to some forms of protection within the constituent countries of England, Scotland, Wales and Northern Ireland, while other forms of protection are more consistent across the UK. Protected areas can be divided according to the type of resource which each seeks to protect. Primarily, these are: scenic or landscape value; biodiversity value (species and habitats); geodiversity value (relating to geology and geomorphology); and cultural or historic value. These categories can overlap.

Besides protected areas, a number of individual features are protected through other designations, such as tree preservation orders, listed buildings, and protected shipwrecks.

== Areas protected for scenic value ==
- National Parks
- Area of Outstanding Natural Beauty (AONB; England, Wales and Northern Ireland), also known as a National Landscape in England and Wales
- National Scenic Area (Scotland)
- Heritage Coast (England and Wales)
- Special Landscape Area (Wales)
- World Heritage Site (International)

== Areas protected for biodiversity value ==
- Environmentally Sensitive Area (ESA)
- Site of Special Scientific Interest (SSSI)
- Marine nature reserve (MNR)
- National nature reserve (NNR)
- Local nature reserve
- Heritage coast (England and Wales)
- Special Area of Conservation (SAC) (European Union)
- Special Protection Area (SPA) (European Union)
- Wetlands designated under the Ramsar Convention (International)
- Biosphere reserve (International)
- World Heritage Site (International)

== Areas protected for geodiversity value ==
- Site of Special Scientific Interest (SSSI)
- Regionally Important Geological Site (RIGS)
- Geopark (International)

== Areas protected for cultural or historic value ==
- Scheduled monument
- Parks, gardens and designed landscapes are protected separately in England, Wales and Scotland:
  - National Register of Historic Parks and Gardens (England)
  - Inventory of Gardens and Designed Landscapes in Scotland
  - Register of Parks and Gardens of Special Historic Interest in Wales
- World Heritage Site (International)

== Protected areas by constituent country ==
- Protected areas of Wales
- Protected areas of Scotland

== See also ==
- Conservation designation
- Conservation in the United Kingdom
