= Forest of Avon Trust =

British charity

The Forest of Avon Trust is the local charity for trees and woodlands in the former county of Avon, which now comprises Bristol, North Somerset, South Gloucestershire, and Bath & North East Somerset.

The Trust's ethos is to deliver the benefits of trees and woodlands to as many people as possible in the Avon area to benefit people and wildlife. It runs wellbeing activities for people with learning disabilities, mental health needs or dementia; it works with schools to plant trees and engage children in the natural world; it supports community groups and young people to improve their local environment; and it works with land owners to care for woodlands and plant new ones. The charity also champions the Forest of Avon Community Forest, working with partners to safeguard existing trees and plant new woodland as part of this.

The Forest of Avon Trust provides accredited Forest School training and has trained 185 Forest School leaders since 2010.

The Forest of Avon Trust currently manages a community woodland near Upton Cheney, South Gloucestershire.

== History ==
The Forest of Avon Trust was established in 2008 to carry on the work of the Forest of Avon Community Forest, which planted over 1 million trees.

Since then the charity has campaigned for strategic woodland creation, in support of the principles of the Community Forest.

In their first three years work included: creating mini-orchards in school grounds, donating thousands of locally grown, native trees and shrubs to school and communities, providing advice and support to local groups to enable them to plant trees, delivering environmental awareness and play activities for local schools and nurseries, delivering tailored woodland activities for adults with learning disabilities, advising landowners on woodland management and Forestry Commission grants and taking on the lease of The Retreat community woodland.

== Patrons ==
- Mike Dilger, naturalist, presenter and writer.
- Professor Alice Roberts, anatomist, writer and broadcaster.
