= Community forests in England =

ENGLAND COMMUNITY FOREST

England's community forests are afforestation-based regeneration projects which were established in the early 1990s. Each of them is a partnership between the Forestry Commission and the Countryside Agency, which are agencies of the British government, and the relevant local councils.

Most of the designated areas are close to large cities and contain large amounts of brownfield, underused and derelict land. When the forests were created the average forest cover in the designated areas was 6.9%, and the target is to increase this to 30% over about 30 years. As most of the land is in private ownership the schemes rely mainly on providing landowners with incentives to plant trees. However the forests contain areas of publicly accessible open land, and increasing public access is one of the objectives.

The table below lists the community forests. As some of them straddle county boundaries they are listed by region and town or city.

Forest	Region	City	Area	Website
Forest of Avon	Bristol and Avon	Bristol	221 square miles (570 km^{2})	
Great Western Community Forest	Swindon and surrounding area	Swindon	168 square miles (440 km^{2})	
Greenwood Community Forest	West Nottinghamshire	Nottingham	161 square miles (420 km^{2})	
Forest of Marston Vale	Bedford to Milton Keynes	Bedford	61 square miles (160 km^{2})	
Forest of Mercia	Staffordshire and West Midlands	Birmingham	92 square miles (240 km^{2})	
Mersey Forest	Merseyside and north Cheshire	Liverpool	420 square miles (1,100 km^{2})	
City of Trees	Greater Manchester	Manchester	492 square miles (1,270 km^{2})	
Humber Forest	East Riding of Yorkshire, Kingston upon Hull and North Lincolnshire	Hull	1,283 square miles (3,320 km^{2})	
Thames Chase	Bruntwood, Barking and Dagenham, Havering, Thurrock and Essex	London	40 square miles (100 km^{2})	
White Rose Forest	Leeds City, North and West Yorkshire	Leeds	4,124 square miles (10,680 km^{2})	
