= List of forests managed by Forestry and Land Scotland =

Forestry and Land Scotland (FLS) (Scottish Gaelic: Coilltearachd agus Fearann Alba) was formed on 1 April 2019 and is responsible for managing and promoting the National Forest Estate in Scotland. The national forest estate owned by FLS covers 6,400 km^{2}, being roughly 8% of the land area of Scotland. Around two-thirds of this land is forested, with the remaining land consisting of a mixture of agricultural land and open areas such as moorland.

As of October 2026 there were 278 individual forests listed on the FLS website; there are also 6 designated forest parks.

== List of forests ==
Name	Location	Area (hectares)	Description	References
Aberfoyle Forest	Stirling		Part of the Queen Elizabeth Forest Park.	
Achnabreac Forest	Argyll and Bute		An area of open woodland close to the prehistoric sites of Kilmartin Glen.	
Achnashellach Forest	Highland	1,535	Achnashellach Forest does not have recreational facilities that many other FLS forests have. It is in a remote part of the Scottish Highlands and is fairly mountainous. The forest was originally part of the Caledonian Forest.	
Aldie Burn Forest	Highland		Has woodland trails along the glen of the Aldie burn.	
Allean Forest	Perth and Kinross		Site of an ancient Pictish fort overlooking Loch Tummel.	
Allt Mor Forest	Highland		Part of Glenmore Forest Park.	
Allt na Crìche Forest	Highland		North of Fort Augustus, overlooking Loch Ness.	
An Lèanachan Forest	Highland		North of Ben Nevis.	
Aoineadh Mòr Forest	Highland		In the Morvern district, the forest has waymarked trails that highlight the impact of the Highland Clearances on the area.	
Ard Hill Forest	Highland		A trail leads to a viewpoint overlooking Loch Alsh.	
Àrd-Àirigh Forest	Highland		Semi-natural Atlantic oakwoods in the Sunart district.	
Ardcastle Forest	Argyll and Bute		Forest on the shore of Loch Fyne, with cycling, horse-riding and walking trails.	
Ardentinny Forest	Argyll and Bute		Part of the Argyll Forest Park, this forest borders Cowal's longest sandy beach, on the shore of Loch Long.	
Ardgartan Forest	Argyll and Bute		Part of the Argyll Forest Park, this forest covers the northern and eastern slopes of The Brack.	
Ardmolich Forest	Highland		Rocky wooded hills, covered mostly in conifer plantations, in the Moidart district.	
Ardyne Forest	Argyll and Bute		Part of the Argyll Forest Park, this forest lies to the south of Dunoon.	
Argyll Forest Park	Argyll and Bute	21,133	In 1935, Argyll Forest became the first Forest Park in Britain. It lies on the border between the Scottish Highlands and the Scottish Lowlands.	
Ariundle Forest	Highland		The Atlantic oakwoods of Airundle have been a national nature reserve since 1977.	
Aros Park Forest	Argyll and Bute		On the outskirts of Tobermory on the Isle of Mull, Aros Park has walking trails, trout fishing and a barbecue area.	
Arrochar Forest	Argyll and Bute		Part of the Argyll Forest Park, FLS property at Arrochar includes the summits of The Cobbler and Beinn Narnain.	
Auchenshuggle Forest	Glasgow		An urban forest in Glasgow's East End, lying between the M74 and the West Coast Main Line.	
Back o’ Bennachie Forest	Aberdeenshire		On the northern slopes of Bennachie, trails here provide a route to hill's highest summit, Oxen Craig.	
Balblair Forest	Highland		Lying to the north of the Kyle of Sutherland, Balblair Wood is laid out with walking and mountain bike trails.	
Balgownie Wood	Fife		Balgownie Wood was once owned by Culross Abbey, and was first planted with trees during the middle ages.	
Balkello Community Woodland	Angus		Balkello was first planted with trees in the 1990s, and there are now 150,000 young trees growing at the site.	
Balloch Woods	Dumfries and Galloway		Sits on the hillside above Creetown.	
Balmacara Woods	Highland		Balmacara Woods is next to Loch Alsh and provides views of Loch Alsh and the Isle of Skye.	
Balmaha Forest	Stirling		Balmaha Forest lies on the shore of Loch Lomond.	
Balnain Forest	Highland		Balnain Forest just west of Loch Ness.	
Bar Hill	East Dunbartonshire		The forest contains an old Roman fort and is next to the Antonine wall.	
Barnaline Forest	Argyll and Bute		Barnaline Forest is home to deer, red squirrels and pine martens.	
Barnluasgan Forest	Argyll and Bute		Barnluasgan Forest is home to beavers which have been recently reintroduced to Scotland.	
Barr Trails	South Ayrshire		Barr Trails contains many miles of walking trails.	
Barrhill Woods	Dumfries and Galloway		Barhill Woods lies next to the harbour town of Kirkcudbright.	
Beinn Lora Forest	Argyll and Bute		The forest is located at the foot of Beinn Lora hill.	
Ben A'an Forest	Stirling		The forest includes the Ben A'an mountain.	
Ben Ledi Forest	Stirling		The forest contains Ben Ledi which is the highest summit in the Trossachs.	
Ben Venue Forest	Stirling		Ben Venue is located next to Loch Achray.	
Ben Wyvis Forest	Highland		Ben Wyvis munro is located north of Inverness.	
Benarty Forest	Fife		Benarty Hill provides views of Loch Leven and Firth of Forth.	
Benmore Forest	Argyll and Bute		The forest contains giant conifers.	
Bennachie Visitor Centre	Aberdeenshire		The visitor centre is a starting point to walk the Bennachie hills.	
Bennan Viewpoint Forest	Dumfries and Galloway		Bennan Forest provides views of Loch Ken.	
Bessie's Hill Forest	Dumfries and Galloway		The White Esk runs alongside Bessie's Hill.	
Black Loch	Falkirk		The loch is located near Limerigg village.	
Black Loch, Galloway	Dumfries and Galloway		There are art sculptures located beside the loch.	
Blackmuir Wood	Highland		Blackmuir Wood has a collection of dozens of ancient rocks.	
Blairadam Forest	Fife		Blairadam Forest contains Blairadam House which was built by William Adam in the 1730s.	
Bluebell Wood	Renfrewshire		Bluebell Wood used to be part of the Johnstone Castle grounds.	
Bochastle Forest	Stirling		Bochastle Forest is near Callander.	
Boden Boo Forest	Renfrewshire		Boden Boo Forest is next to the Erskine Bridge.	
Borgie Breco Forest	Highland		Borgie Breco Forest provides views of the Borgie River.	
Borgie Glen	Highland		Borgie Glen contains a sculpture of a skeleton by artist Kenny Hunter.	
Braes of Foss Forest	Perth and Kinross		The forest is the starting point to clumb the Schiehallion munro.	
Braeval Forest	Stirling		Braeval Forest provides views of Lake of Menteith.	
Bridge of Orchy Forest	Argyll and Bute		The trails lead into Glen Orchy.	
Broadford Forest	Highland		Broadford forest provides views of the Camus na Sgianadin bay.	
Brodick Castle Forest	North Ayrshire		Brodick Castle grounds.	
Bruce's Stone, Loch Trool	Dumfries and Galloway		A stone is engraved to commemorate Robert the Bruce's victory at the Battle of Glen Trool.	
Caberston Forest	Scottish Borders		Pirn Hill in Caberston Forest has several stone carvings depicting Innerleithen's history.	
Cademuir Forest	Scottish Borders		Cademuir Forest has good views of the surrounding area and wildlife spotting.	
Callander Crags	Stirling		The Callander Crags are part of the Highland Boundary Fault.	
Callender Wood	Falkirk		Callender Woods are part of the Callender House.	
Cally Woods	Dumfries and Galloway		The woods were part of the ground for Cally House.	
Camas Tòrsa	Highland		The name in Gaelic means "the bay of Thor's river".	
Cambus o’May	Aberdeenshire		Cambus o’May is next to the River Dee.	
Canmore Forest	Highland		Canmore Forest contains several iron age hut circles.	
Campsie Glen	East Dunbartonshire		Campsie Glen runs alongside the Kirk Burn.	
Cardenden Forest	Fife		Cardenden Forest is the site of Scotland's last duel.	
Cardrona Forest	Scottish Borders		Cardrona Tower is located within Cardrona Forest.	
Carie Forest	Perth and Kinross		Carie is next to Loch Rannoch.	
Carradale Forest	Argyll and Bute		Carradale Forest has views of the Isle of Arran.	
Carrick Forest Drive	South Ayrshire		Carrick Forest is a drive between Loch Doon and Stinchar Bridge.	
Carron Valley Forest	Stirling		Carron Valley Reservoir is next to the forest.	
Castle O'er Forest	Dumfries and Galloway		Castle O'er is a prehistoric settlement.	
Change House	Highland		The ruins of Change House are on the South side of Loch Ness.	
Cheviots	Scottish Borders		The Cheviot Hills are near the Anglo-Scottish border.	
Clach na Crìche	Highland		Clach na Crìche is next to the Sound of Mull.	
Clatteringshaws	Dumfries and Galloway		Located beside the Clatteringshaws Loch.	
Cochno Hill	West Dunbartonshire		The hill provides views of Glasgow and the Central Belt.	
Contin Forest	Highland		Contin forest hosts a 24-hour endurance bike race.	
Corlarach Forest	Argyll and Bute		Corlarach provides views over the Firth of Clyde.	
Countesswells Forest	Aberdeen		The woods were part of the Countesswells estate.	
Craig Forest	Highland		Several routes to Munros start in Craig Forest.	
Craigieburn Forest	Dumfries and Galloway		Cragieburn Forest is next to Moffat Water.	
Craigmonie Forest	Highland		Craigmonie Forest overlooks Urquhart Bay.	
Craigvinean Forest	Perth and Kinross		Craigvinean Forest provides views of the River Tay.	
Craik Forest	Scottish Borders		Craik Forest is primarily a commercial forest with timber being processed at facilities nearby. There are some recreational facilities within the forest.	
Creag Phàdraig Forest	Highland		There is an Iron Age hillfort that is over 2000 years old.	
Crianlarich Community Woodland	Stirling		The forest was created in partnership with the local community.	
Crinan Forest	Argyll and Bute		Provides views over the Sound of Jura.	
Cruach an Tairbeirt	Argyll and Bute		As the name suggests, longships used to be portaged through the woods to Loch Lomond.	
Culbin Forest	Moray		The forest streches between Nairn and Findhorn Bay.	
Culbokie Forest	Highland		Culbokie is on the edge of Black Isle.	
Culloden Wood	Highland		Location of the Battle of Culloden.	
Cuningar Loop	South Lanarkshire		A woodland park by the River Clyde.	
Dalbeattie Forest	Dumfries and Galloway	1,100	Dalbeattie Forest has primarily been a commercial forest, though the Forestry Commission has worked with local organisations to expand recreational facilities. The forest now hosts one of the 7stanes biking trails.	
Daviot Wood	Highland		Daviot Wood is near Inverness.	
Dean Plantation	Fife		Dean Plantation near Dunfermline.	
Denlethen Forest	Aberdeenshire		Denlethen has an old curling pond.	
Deuchny Hill Bike Park	Perth and Kinross		The park has several trails for cyclists.	
Devilla Forest	Fife		Devilla Forest is a hotspot for dragonflies.	
Divach Falls Forest	Highland			
Doach Wood Forest	Dumfries and Galloway			
Dog Falls Forest	Highland			
Donview Forest	Aberdeenshire			
Douglas Fir Wood Forest	Perth and Kinross			
Drummond Hill Forest	Perth and Kinross			
Duke's Pass	Stirling			
Dunardry Forest	Argyll and Bute			
Dunnotar Woods	Aberdeenshire			
Dyemill Forest	North Ayrshire			
Eas Urchaidh	Argyll and Bute			
Eastfield Forest	North Lanarkshire			
Falls of Shin	Highland			
Faskally Forest	Highland			
Fauldhouse Forest	West Lothian			
Fauldhouse Forest	West Lothian			
Fearnoch Forest	Argyll and Bute			
Ferrycroft Forest	Highland			
Feshiebridge Forest	Highland			
Fishnish	Argyll and Bute			
Foggieton Forest	Aberdeen			
Forest of Ae	Dumfries and Galloway	9,100	Ae was created by the Forestry Commission soon after it was established. While it is mainly a commercial forest, it is also one of the 7stanes forests.	
Gallowhill Forest	Dumfries and Galloway			
Galloway Forest Park	Dumfries and Galloway	97,000	Galloway Forest is the largest forest in Britain. In 2009 it became the first Dark Sky Park in the UK.	
Garadhban Forest	Stirling			
Garbh Eilean	Highland			
Garmony Forest	Argyll and Bute			
Garshellach Forest	Stirling			
Gartmorn Forest	Clackmannanshire			
Gleann a’ Ghealbhain Forest	Argyll and Bute			
Glen Aros	Argyll and Bute			
Glen Brittle	Highland			
Glen Creran	Argyll and Bute			
Glen Doll	Angus			
Glen Hurich (Polloch)	Highland			
Glen Lochy	Argyll and Bute			
Glen Nant	Argyll and Bute			
Glen Nevis	Highland			
Glen of the Bar	Dumfries and Galloway			
Glen Righ	Highland			
Glenamour Forest	Dumfries and Galloway			
Glenbranter Forest	Argyll and Bute			
Glencoe Lochan	Highland		Glencoe Lochan forest was established by 1st Baron Strathcona in the 19th century. It is a coniferous forest.	
Glenfinnan Forest	Highland			
Glengarry Forest	Highland			
Glenkinnon Forest	Scottish Borders			
Glenmore Forest Park	Highland	3,500	Glenmore contains some Caledonian woodland. It became the second Forest Park to be created by the Commission in 1948.	
Glenmore Visitor Centre	Highland			
Glenrickard Forest	North Ayrshire			
Glentress Forest	Scottish Borders			
Glentrool	Dumfries and Galloway			
Grandtully Forest	Perth and Kinross			
Greenoakhill Forest	Glasgow			
Hayfield Forest	Highland			
Heathhall Forest	Dumfries and Galloway			
Honeymoon Bridge Forest	Argyll and Bute			
Mabie Forest	Dumfries and Galloway		Mabie Forest has been owned by the Forestry Commission since 1943. It has become a recreational forest, with walking routes and 7stanes biking trails.	
Queen Elizabeth Forest Park	Stirling	16,780	The Queen Elizabeth Forest Park consists of several forests. It became a forest park in 1953 on the occasion of the coronation of Queen Elizabeth II.	
Tay Forest Park	Perthshire		The Tay Forest Park is made up of several different forests. The forest has been visited by several royals, including Queen Victoria and Queen Isabella of Scotland.	
Tweed Valley Forest Park	Scottish Borders	6,800	The Tweed Valley Forest Park is made up of seven forests around the Scottish Borders. Glentress and Innerleithen forests are part of the 7stanes biking trail project.	

== See also ==
- List of sites on the Inventory of Gardens and Designed Landscapes
