= Kailzie Gardens =

Garden in Scottish Borders

Coordinates: 55.6349°N 3.1449°W

Designations

Inventory of Gardens and Designed Landscapes in Scotland
- Official name: Kailzie
- Designated: 1 July 1987
- Reference no.: GDL00229

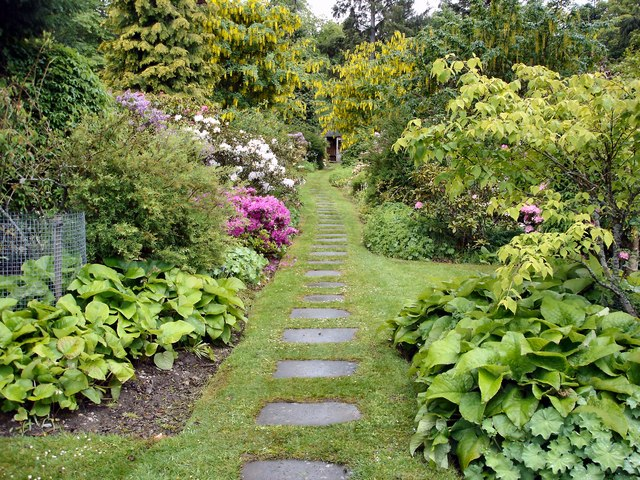
The path to the summer house in Kailzie Gardens, Peebles

Kailzie Gardens is a walled garden near Kirkburn in the Scottish Borders area of Scotland, in the Tweed valley, 2.5 miles (4 km) east of Peebles, off the B7062.

The garden dates from 1812. The present owners are Richard and Louise Vardy.

Places in the vicinity include Cardrona, the Cardrona Forest, Horsburgh Castle and the Glentress Forest.

== See also ==
- List of places in the Scottish Borders
- List of places in Scotland
