= Horsburgh =

Horsburgh may refer to:

== Places ==
- Horsburgh Atoll or Goidhoo, inhabited islands of Southern Maalhosmadulhu Atoll
- Horsburgh Castle, ruined tower house castle near Glentress in Scotland
- Horsburgh Island, one of the Cocos (Keeling) Islands
- Horsburgh Lighthouse, lighthouse on Pedra Branca, Singapore, which marks the eastern entrance to the Straits of Singapore
- Horsburgh Point, on the southwest side of Montagu Island in the South Sandwich Islands
- Nether Horsburgh Castle, ruined tower house near Cardrona, Scotland

== Other uses ==
- Horsburgh (surname)
- Alexander Horsburgh Turnbull (1868–1918), New Zealand merchant, dandy and book collector

== See also ==
- Horsbrugh (surname)
