= Kirkburn, Scottish Borders =

Village in Scottish Borders, Scotland

Coordinates: 55.6346°N 3.1258°W

Kirkburn is a village on the B7062, close to Peebles and the River Tweed, in the Scottish Borders area of Scotland, at the edge of the Cardrona Forest.

Other places in the vicinity are Glen Ho, Glentress, Horsburgh Castle, Innerleithen, Kailzie, Kailzie Gardens, Kirkhope Law, Neidpath Castle and Nether Horsbrugh.

== See also ==
- Kailzie Gardens
- List of places in the Scottish Borders
- List of places in Scotland
