= Cardrona, Scottish Borders =

Village in Scotland

Coordinates: 55.6401°N 3.1121°W

Cardrona
- Location within the Scottish Borders
- Population: 890 (2020)
- Council area: Scottish Borders
- Lieutenancy area: Tweeddale
- Country: Scotland
- Sovereign state: United Kingdom
- Post town: PEEBLES
- Postcode district: EH45
- Dialling code: 01896
- Police: Scotland
- Fire: Scottish
- Ambulance: Scottish
- UK Parliament: Dumfriesshire, Clydesdale and Tweeddale
- Scottish Parliament: Midlothian South, Tweeddale and Lauderdale.

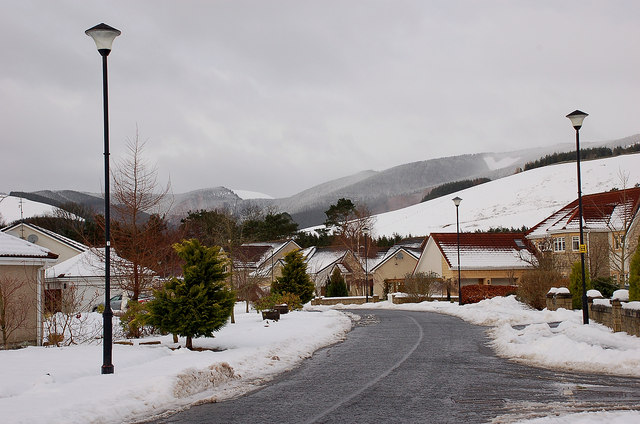
A new development in the village during winter

Cardrona is a village on the A72 and B7062, between Peebles and Innerleithen, in the Scottish Borders area of Scotland.

Places nearby include Glentress, Kirkburn, Scottish Borders, Kirkhouse, Traquair, and Walkerburn.

== History ==
In 1999 local farmer Tom Renwick spent £5m on the development of Cardrona, a small village to be created near the town of Peebles. There was controversy towards the project because people felt that it would destroy the view of the River Tweed and the hills that surround it but the development of the village went ahead. Roughly 220 houses were built around the Cardrona area, and the last street was named "Renwick Lane" after its founder. A hotel now known as the MacDonald Hotel was built later on, along with a golf course.

In the late 2000s Cardrona got a PlayPark built inside of the small patch of land near Govan's Way.

In 2010 Cardrona got a Pump Track after winning a competition in the Scottish Borders. It was built in August 2010 and then got rebuilt in 2018, and shortly reopened in February 2018 after the Bikescapes team re-imagined the track after it had grown on itself over time. This was built in Cardrona mostly to supplement younger children's biking needs and to influence them to go biking at Glentress in the future.

== Etymology ==
Cardrona is etymologically a Cumbric place-name. The first element is cognate with Welsh caer 'fortification'. The second element is less clear but recent work suggests a word cognate with Welsh trwyn, literally 'nose' but attested in Welsh and Cornish place-names in the sense 'promontory'. If so the name means something like 'fort of the promontories'.

== See also ==
- Cardrona Forest
- List of places in the Scottish Borders
- List of places in Scotland
