= Chinese pheasant =

Chinese pheasant can refer to any pheasant species originally native to China.

Usually it means either:

- Common pheasant (Phasianus colchicus) which including the ring-necked pheasants. This usage is most common in the United States where the bird is widely naturalized.
- Golden pheasant (Chrysolophus pictus). This usage is most common elsewhere, particularly in Britain where both species are widely naturalized.

Like in all pheasants, the males are unmistakable while the females look much more alike

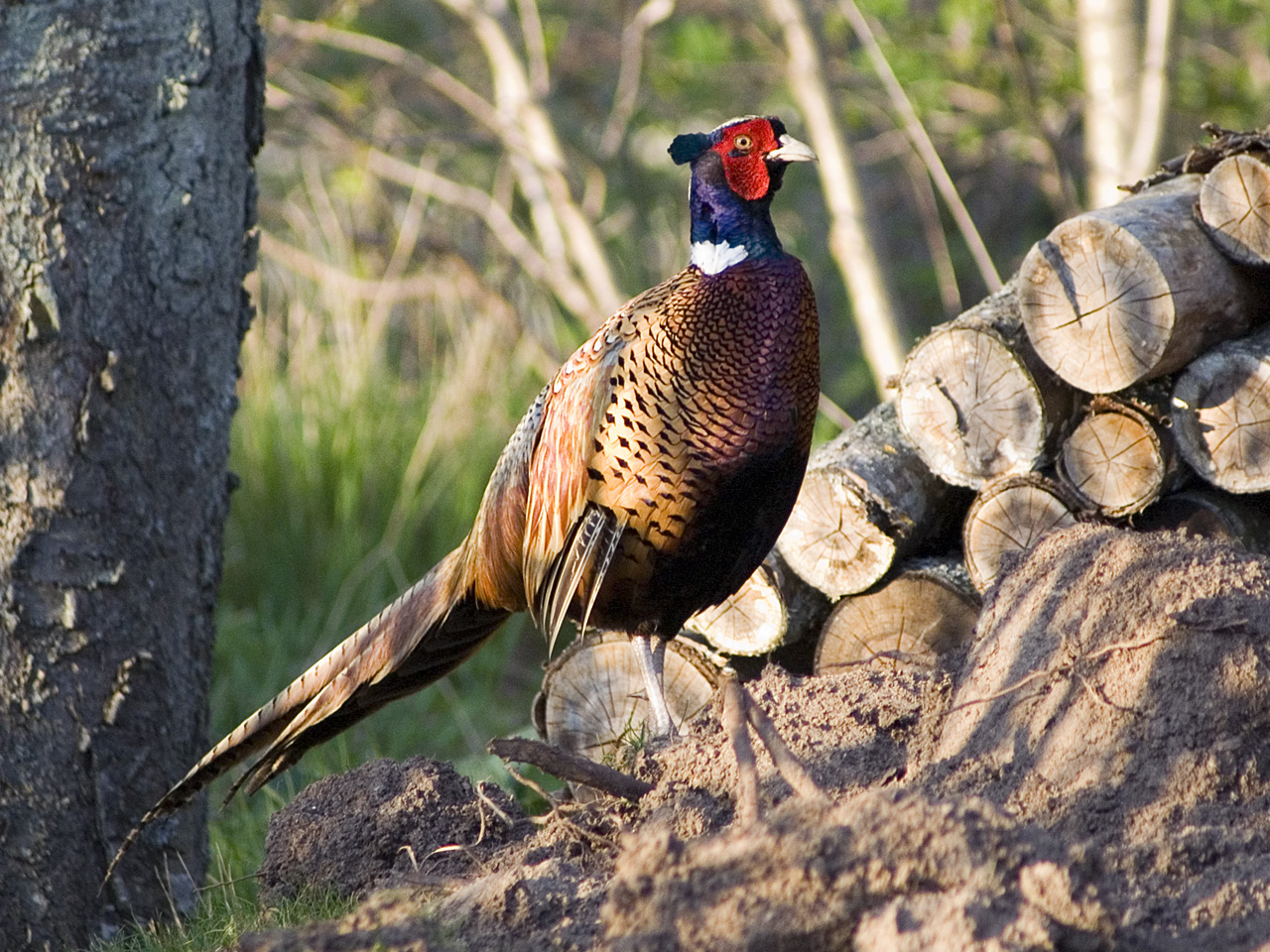
"Ring-necked" Common Pheasant male

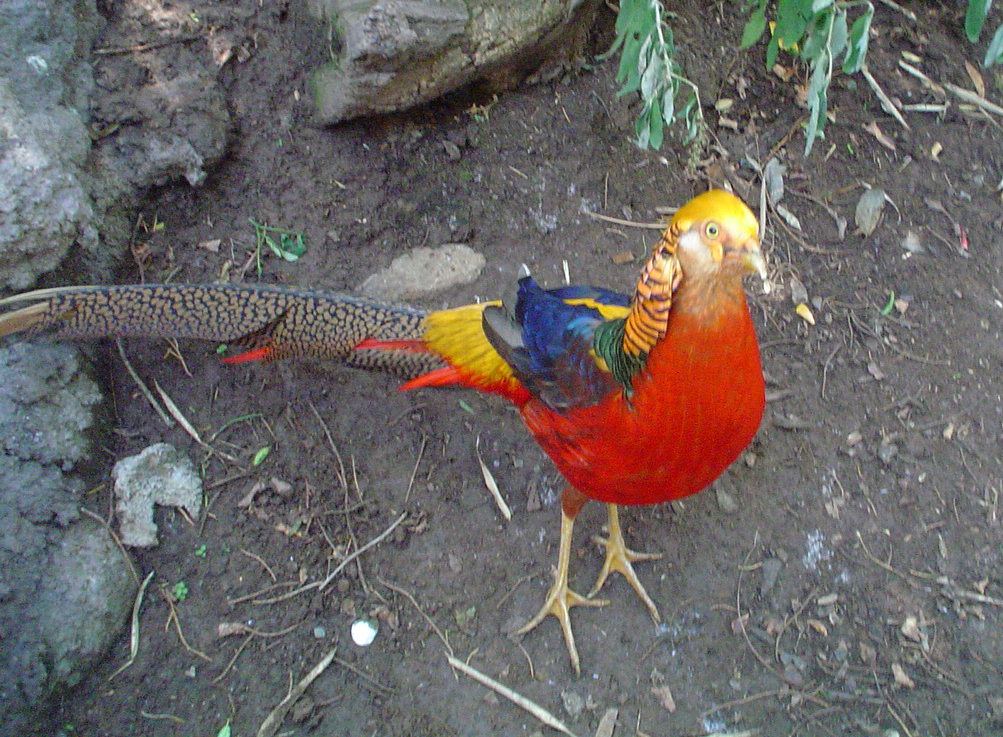
Golden Pheasant male

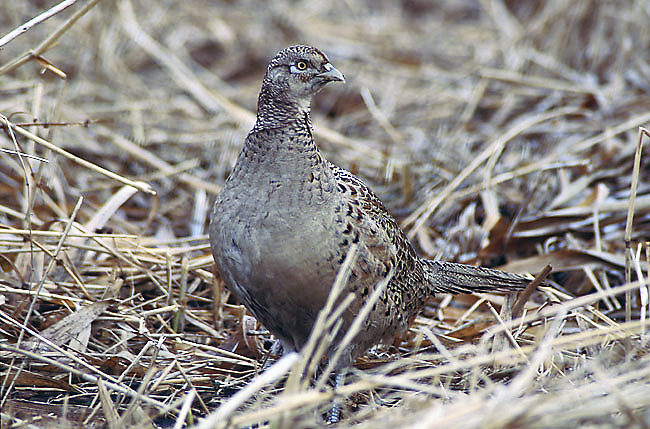
Common Pheasant female

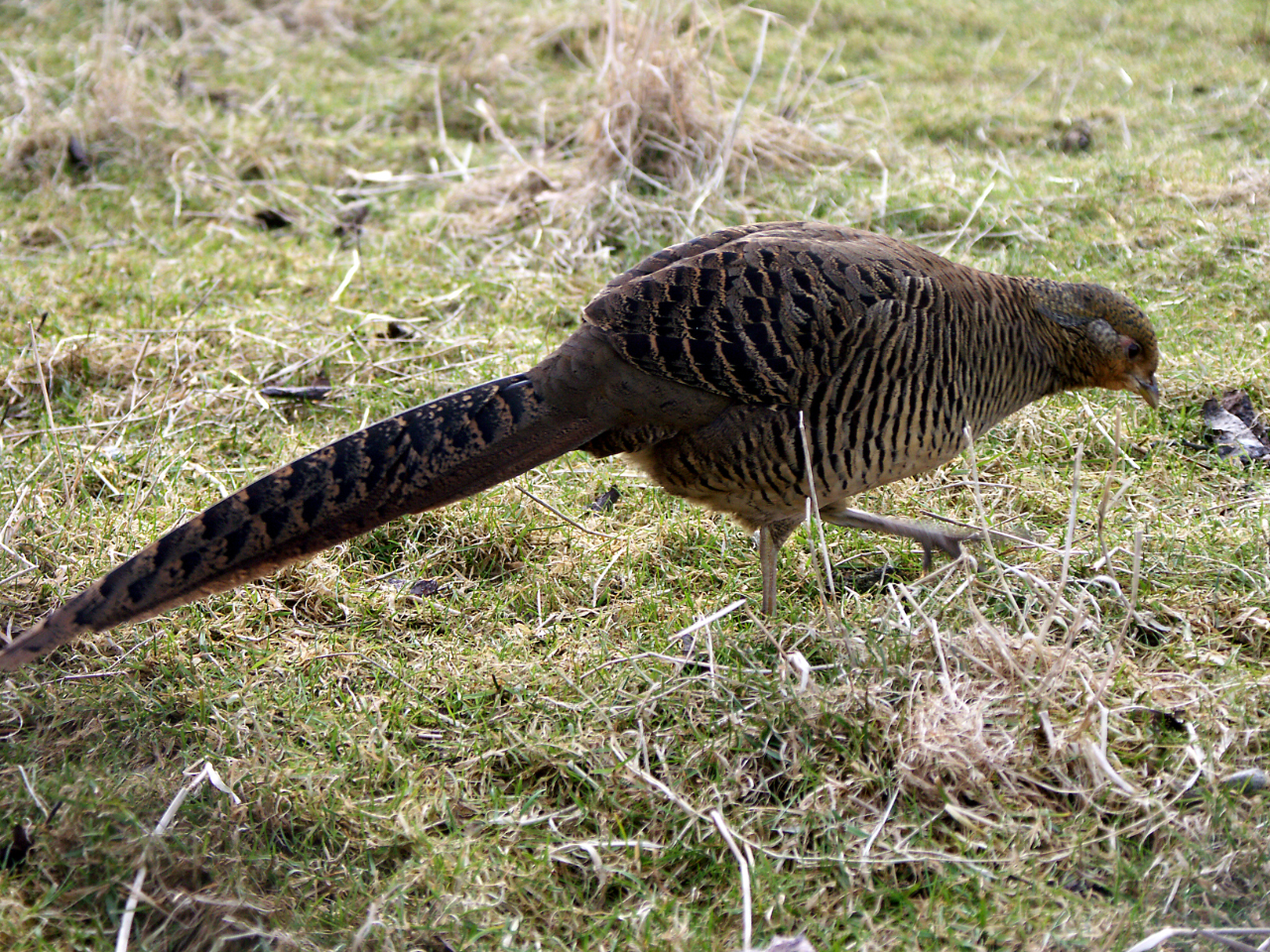
Golden Pheasant female
