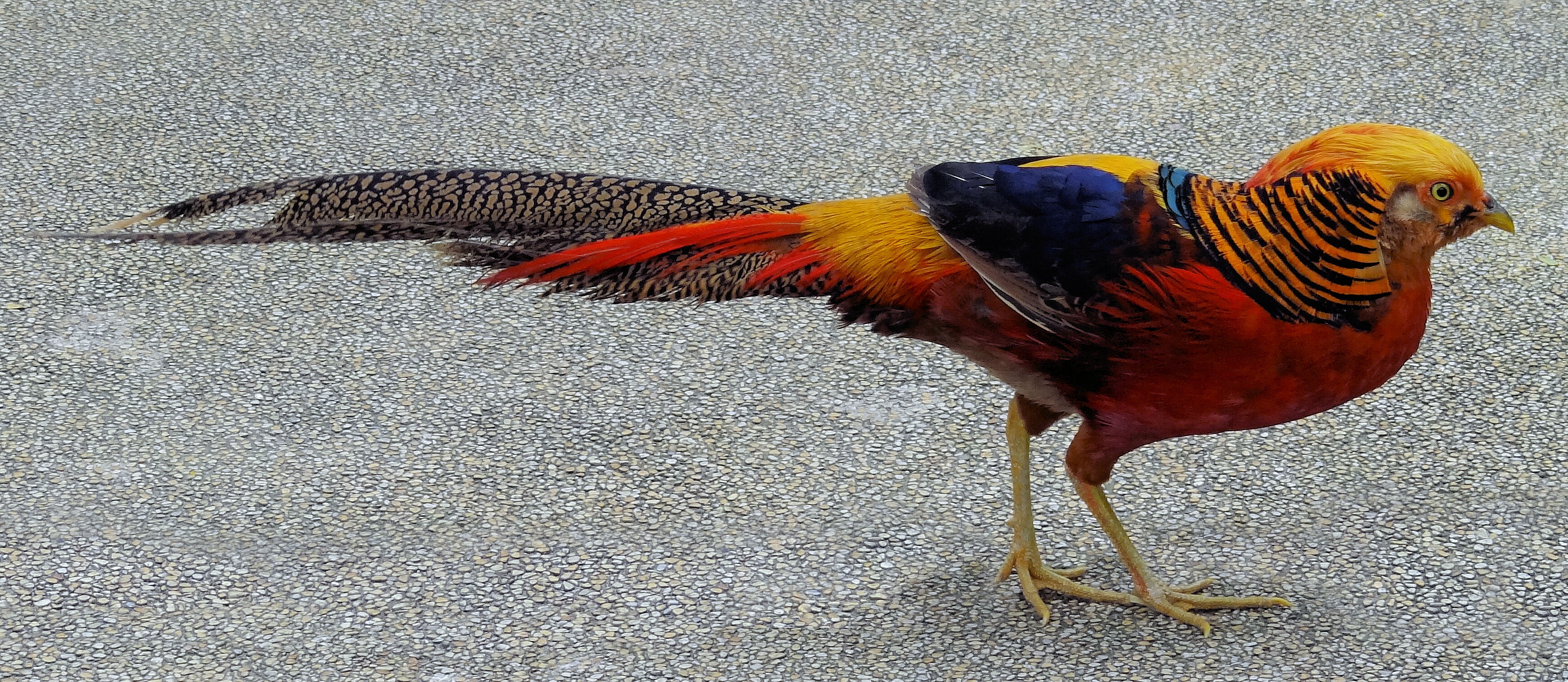
- Male at Kuala Lumpur Bird Park, Malaysia
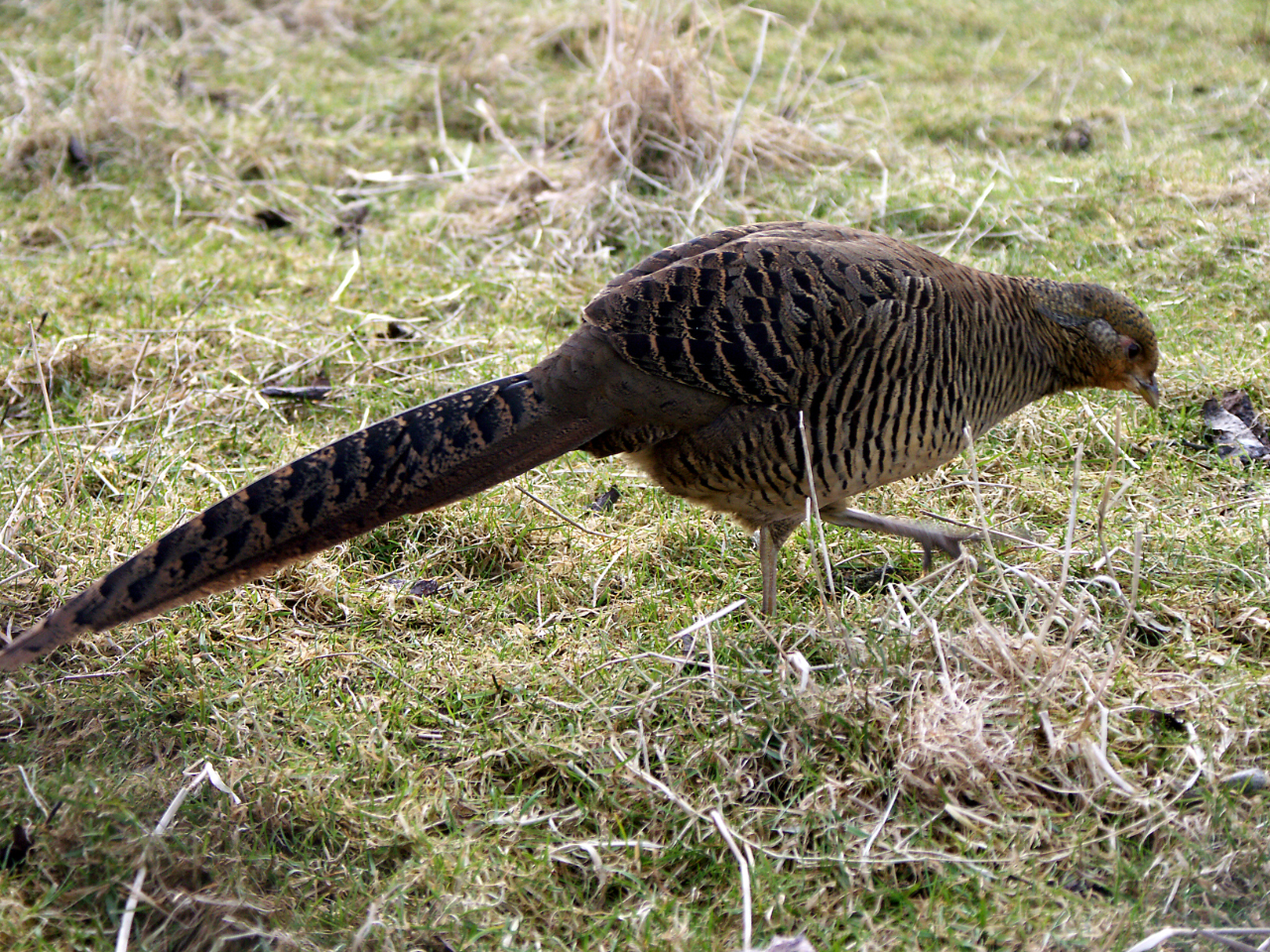
- Captive female in Svalöv, Sweden

Conservation status
- Least Concern (IUCN 3.1)

Scientific classification
- Kingdom: Animalia
- Phylum: Chordata
- Class: Aves
- Order: Galliformes
- Family: Phasianidae
- Genus: Chrysolophus
- Species: C. pictus

Binomial name
- Chrysolophus pictus (Linnaeus, 1758)

Synonyms
- Phasianus pictus Linnaeus, 1758

= Golden pheasant =

Species of bird

The golden pheasant (Chrysolophus pictus), also known as the Chinese pheasant and rainbow pheasant, is a gamebird of the order Galliformes (gallinaceous birds) and the family Phasianidae (pheasants). The genus name is from Ancient Greek khrusolophos, "with golden crest", and pictus is Latin for "painted" from pingere, "to paint".

== Taxonomy ==
The golden pheasant was formally described in 1758 by Swedish naturalist Carl Linnaeus in the 10th edition of his Systema Naturae under the binomial name Phasianus pictus. He specified the type location as China. The specific epithet pictus is Latin meaning "painted". The golden pheasant is now placed with Lady Amherst's pheasant in the genus Chrysolophus that was introduced in 1834 by English zoologist John Edward Gray.

== Description ==
The adult male is about 100 cm (39 in) in length, with its tail accounting for two-thirds of the total length, and around 500–700 g (1.1–1.5 lb) in weight. Its coloration is characterized by a golden crest and rump and by a bright red body. It possesses an orange ruff or "cape" on the back that can be spread in display, appearing as an alternating black and orange fan that covers all of the face except for the eyes. The eye is bright yellow, with a pinpoint black pupil. The face, throat, chin, and the sides of neck are rusty tan. The wattles and orbital skin are both yellow. The upper back is green, and the rest of the back and rump is golden-yellow. The tertiary feathers on the wings are blue, whereas the scapulars are dark red. The central tail feathers are black spotted with cinnamon, while the tip of the tail is a cinnamon buff. The upper tail coverts are the same colour as the central tail feathers. The male also has a scarlet breast, and scarlet and light chestnut flanks and underparts. Lower legs and feet are a dull yellow.

The adult female (hen) is 60–80 cm (24–31 in) in length and weighs around 350 g (0.8 lb). Her tail is proportionally longer, and makes up roughly half of her total length. She is much less showy than the male, with a duller, mottled brown plumage similar to that of the female common pheasant, but is darker and more slender. The female's breast and sides are barred buff and blackish brown, and the abdomen is plain buff. She has a buff face and throat. Some abnormal females may later in their lifetimes develop some male plumage. Both males and females have yellow legs and yellow bills.

== Distribution and habitat ==
The golden pheasant is native to forests in mountainous areas of western China, but feral populations have been established in the United Kingdom, Canada, the United States, Mexico, Colombia, Peru, Bolivia, Chile, Argentina, Uruguay, the Falkland Islands, Germany, Belgium, the Netherlands, France, Ireland, Australia, and New Zealand.

=== Introduced populations ===
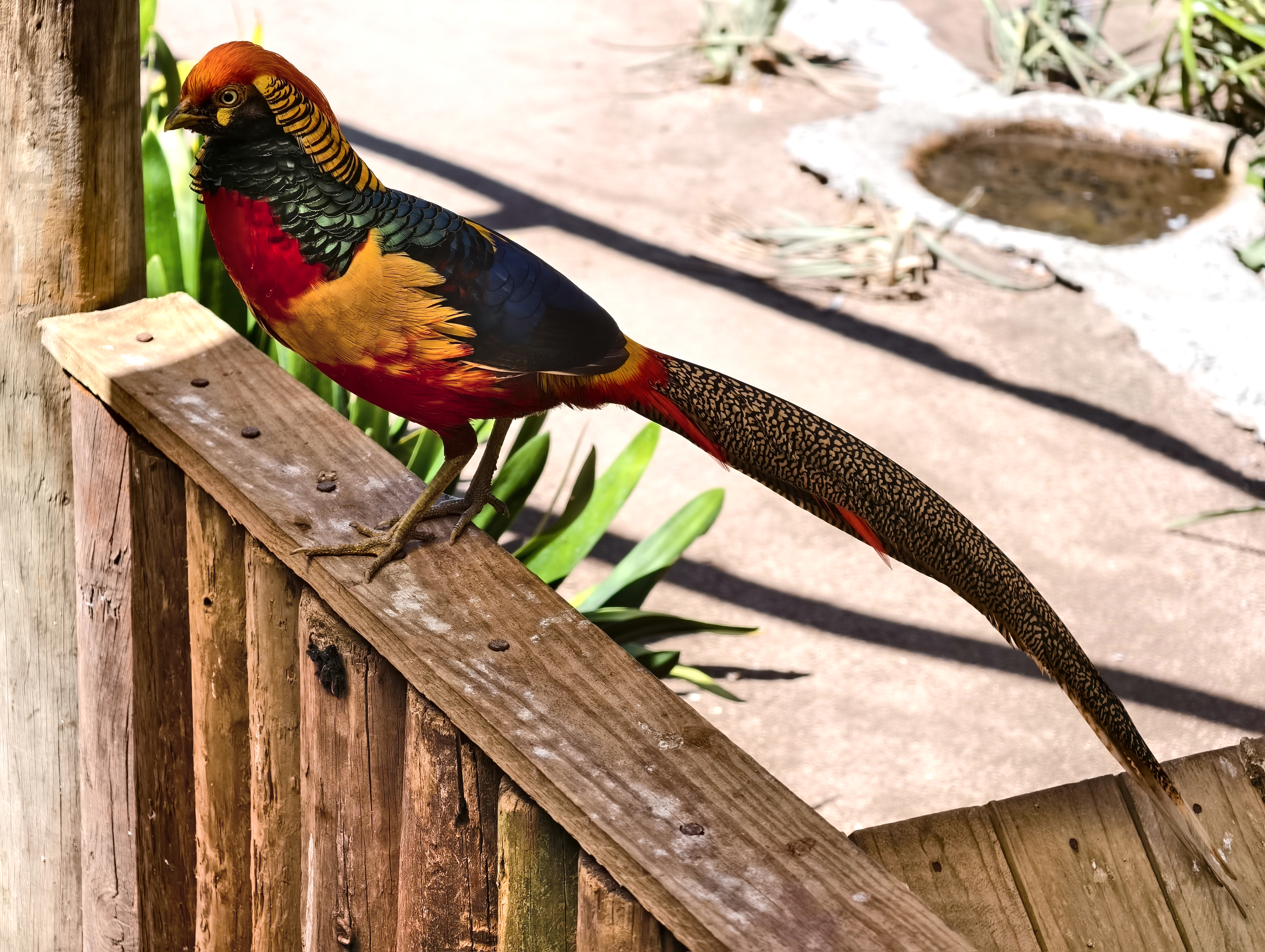
A male hybrid of golden pheasant (Chrysolophus pictus) and Lady Amherst's pheasant (Chrysolophus amherstiae), World of Birds Wildlife Sanctuary & Monkey Park, Hout Bay, Cape Town, South Africa

The first record of a free-ranging golden pheasant in England is in Norfolk in 1845, which was initially identified as a hybrid of common pheasant and red-legged partridge. Over the following decades, golden pheasants were released in a number of locations in England and Scotland, such as in Kintyre, Cairnsmore of Fleet, Tortworth, Kent, and East Anglia. Some of these introductions also included Lady Amherst's pheasants and golden-Lady Amherst's hybrids, which often interbred with one another. Later introductions were done in estates and hunting ranges throughout England. By 1979, the largest stable populations occurred in the Breckland andGalloway, which show moderate growth, with a population of 250 individuals in the Kirroughtree Forest. Smaller populations were recorded elsewhere, such as in the Isles of Scilly, the Isle of Anglesey, Norfolk, and Cardrona Forest, where nesting pairs were first recorded in 1974. By the 1980s and 1990s, the British populations had reached a high of 1,000–2,000 individuals, but declined sharply afterwards due to a combination of declining releases and predation by growing populations of goshawks. English golden pheasants are mainly concentrated in Norfolk and Suffolk, while the Scottish populations have died out. Released and dispersing individuals still occur sporadically. Most golden pheasants in Great Britain have at least traces of ancestry from hybridization with Lady Amherst's pheasants.

Golden pheasants were introduced to Maui, in Hawaii, at some point before their first detection in 1996. The original birds were released in The Nature Conservancy's Waikamoi Preserve, where the founder population has shown evidence of reproductive behavior. Secondary groups were later recorded in Hanawï Natural Area Reserve and Haleakalä National Park, where they most probably arrived through dispersal from Waikamoi. Overall, the pheasants inhabit areas between 1,700 and 2,400 m (5,577 and 7,874 ft) on the windward slope of the island.

== Ecology ==
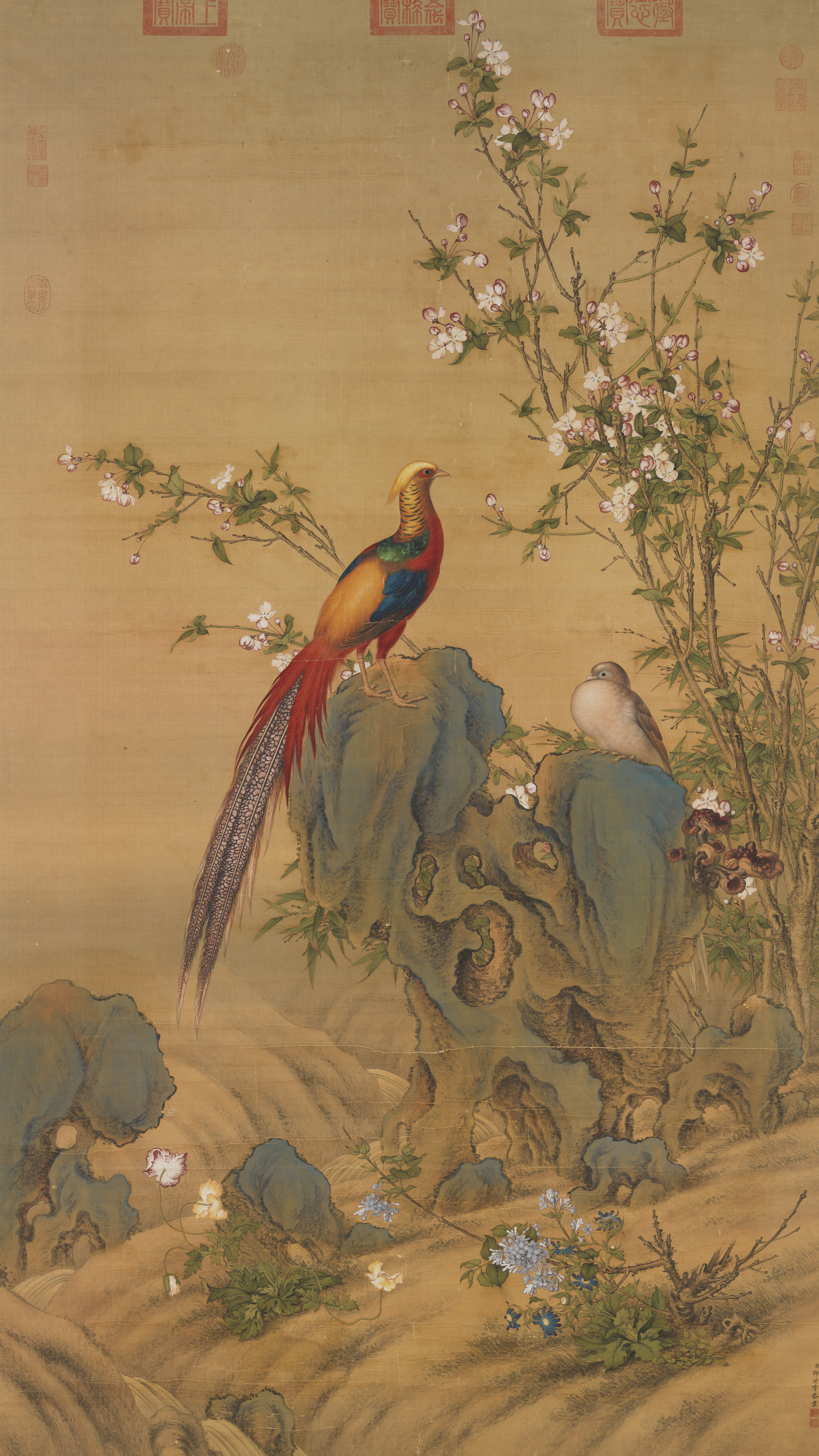
Golden Pheasants in Spring painting by Giuseppe Castiglione, Qing Empire, 18th century

Golden pheasants feed on the ground on grain, leaves, and invertebrates, but they roost in trees at night. During winter, flocks tend to forage close to human settlements at the edge of forests, taking primarily wheat leaves and seeds. While they can fly clumsily in short bursts, they prefer to run and spend most of their time on the ground. This type of flying is commonly known as "flapping flight" and is due to a lack of a deep layer of m. pectoralis pars thoracicus and the tendon that attaches to it. This muscle is commonly attributed to the stabilization of flight in other birds; however, the absence of this deep layer causes this mode of "flapping flight", which is simply a mechanism that it shares with other ground birds to escape predators, but they seem to prefer to simply run away and hide from predators rather than to fly.

Golden pheasants lay 8 to 12 eggs at a time and then incubate them for around 22–23 days. They tend to eat berries, grubs, seeds, and other types of vegetation.

== In captivity ==
The golden pheasant is commonly found in zoos and aviaries, but often as hybrid specimens that have the similar Lady Amherst's pheasant in their lineage.

Also, different mutations of the golden pheasant are known from birds in captivity, including the dark-throated, yellow, cinnamon, salmon, peach, splash, mahogany, and silver. In aviculture, the wild type is referred to as "red-golden" to differentiate it from these mutations.

The coloration in the feathers can be an indication to the genetic quality of the male golden pheasant. Hue, brightness, and chroma are usually measured to see color differences. Heterozygosity of the most polymorphic major histocompatibility complex locus was highly related with the chroma and brightness of the feathers.

== Gallery ==
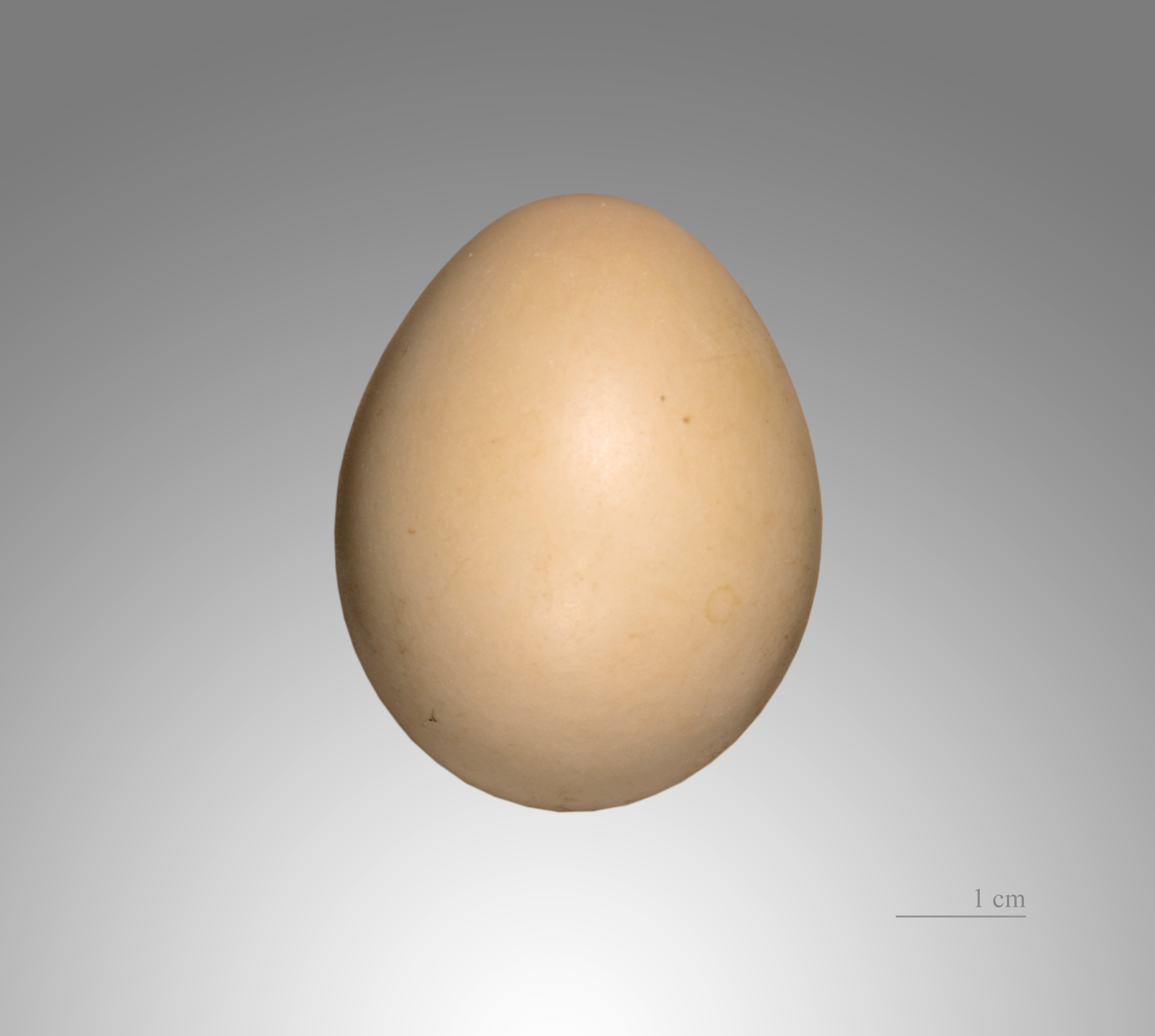
Golden pheasant, egg – MHNT

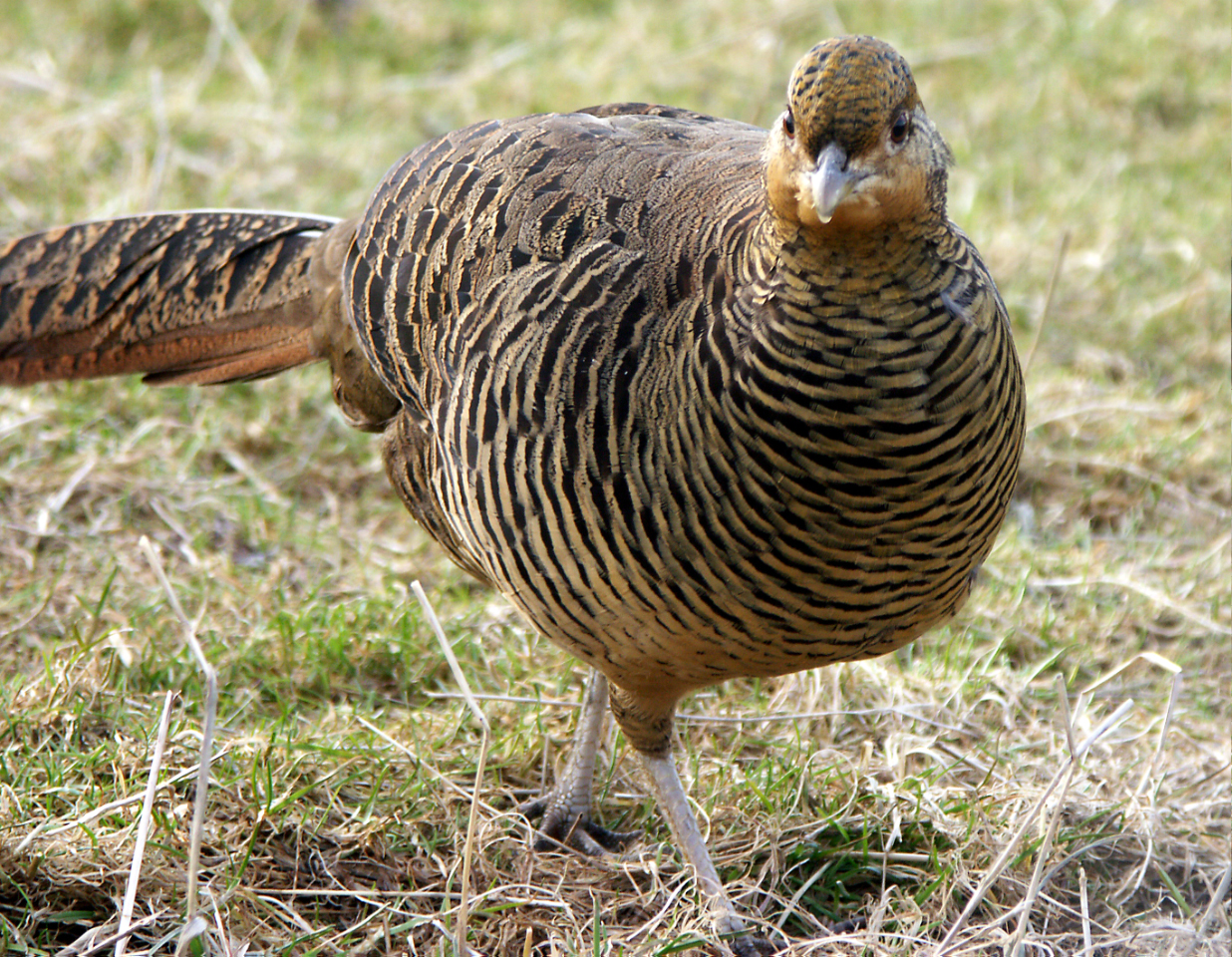
Female

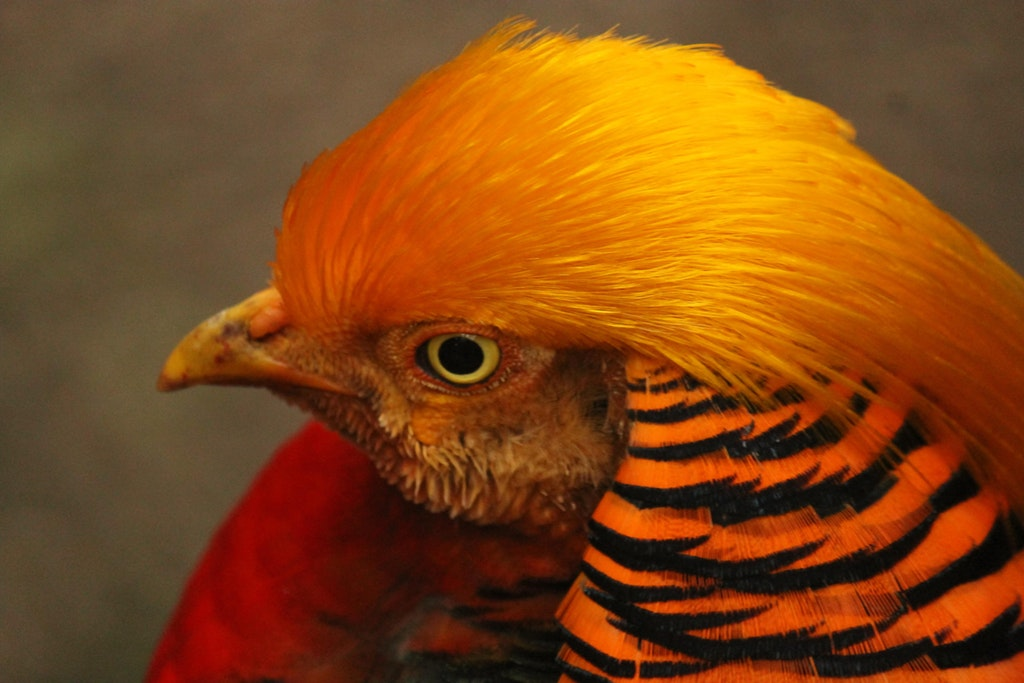
Male

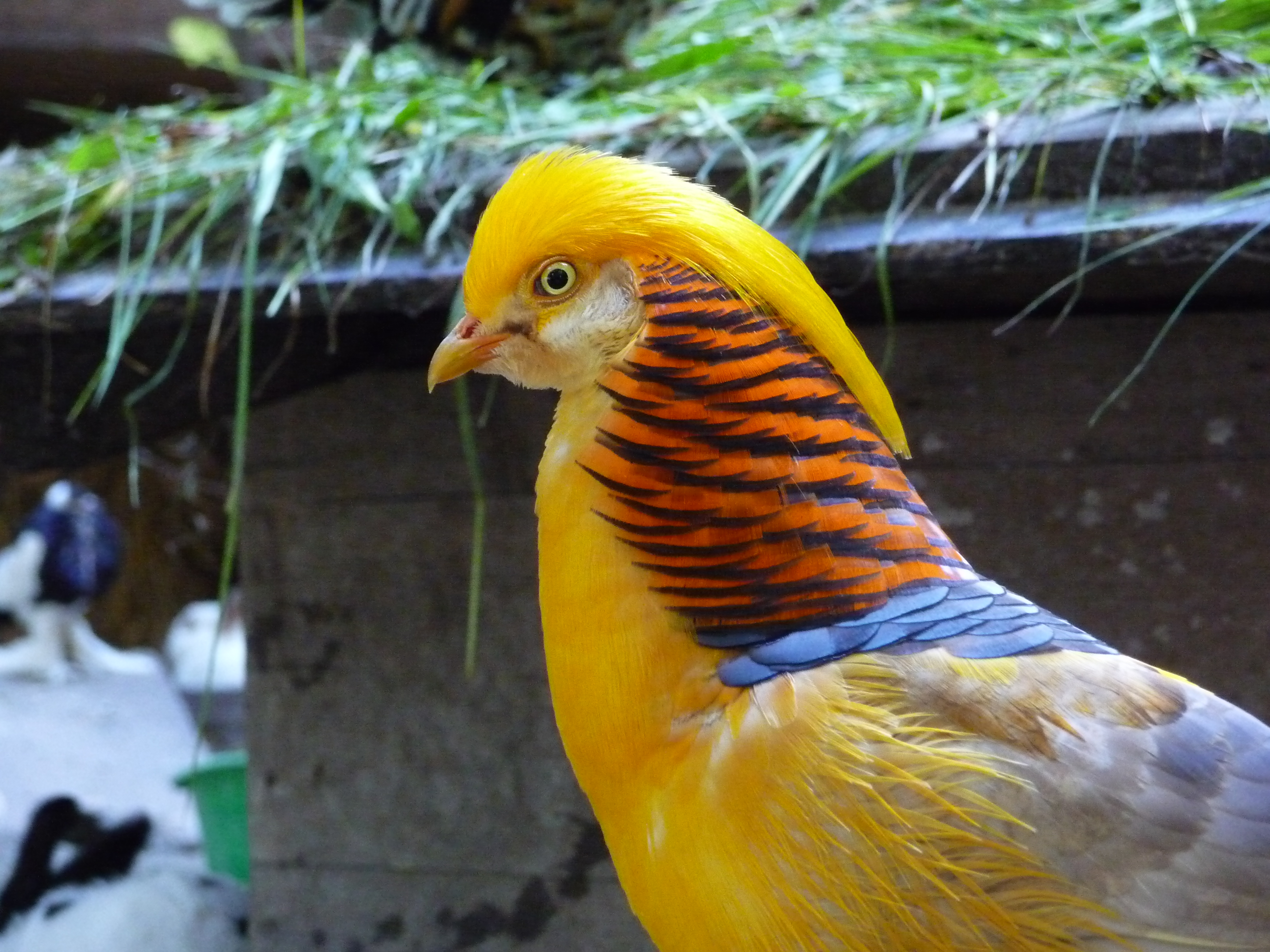
The yellow

Golden pheasant in captivity

== See also ==
- List of endangered and protected species of China
- Yellow pheasant (bird)
