= SDSO =

SDSO may refer to:

- San Diego County Sheriff's Office, a law enforcement agency in San Diego County, California
- Scottish Dark Sky Observatory, a former astronomical observatory in Scotland
- South Dakota Symphony Orchestra, an American orchestra from Sioux Falls, South Dakota
