= Loch Macaterick =

Loch in East Ayrshire, Scotland

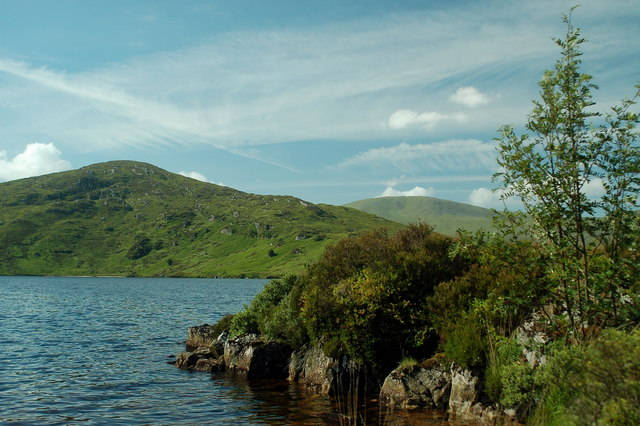
- View of Loch Macaterick

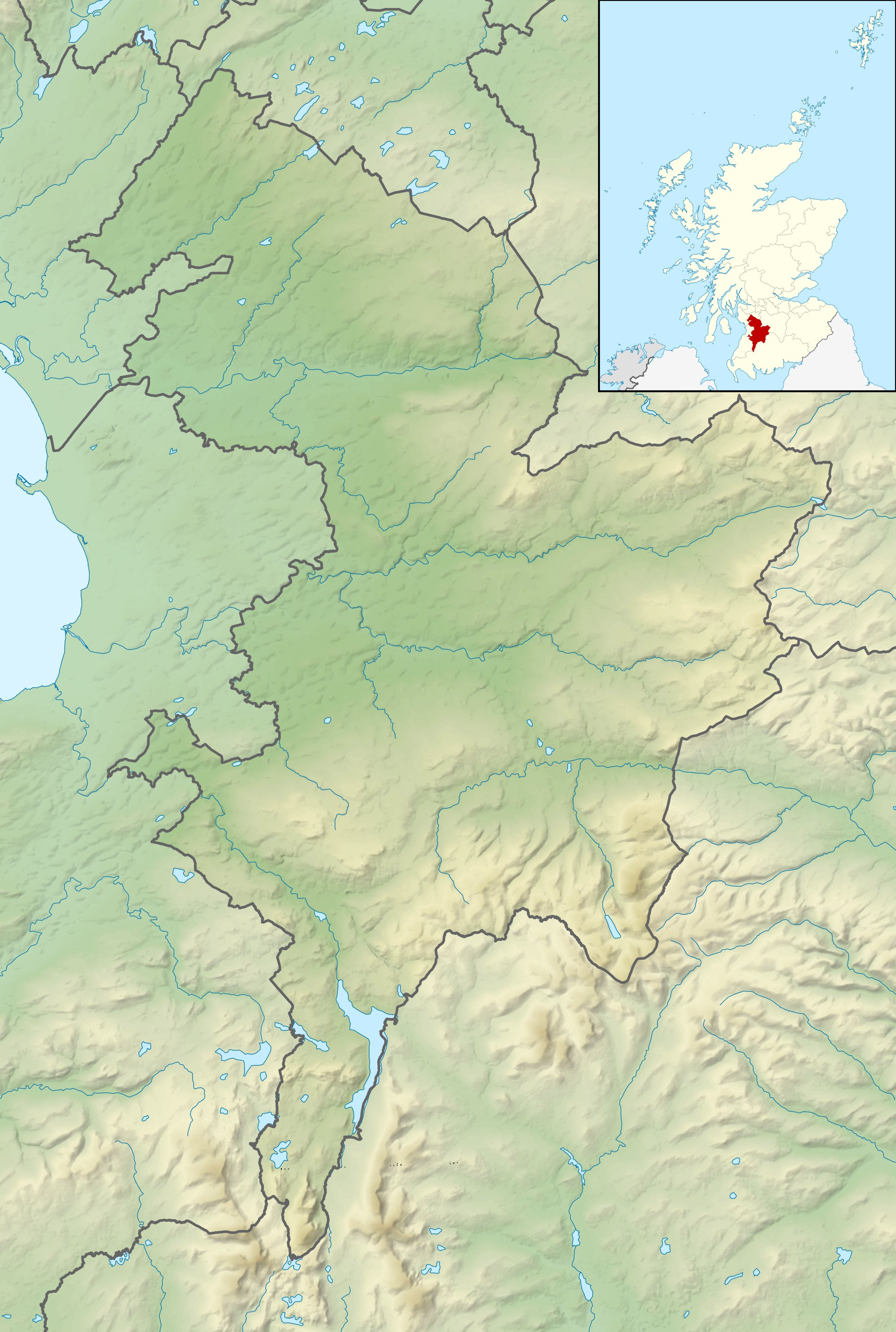
- Location within East Ayrshire
- Location: East Ayrshire, Scotland
- Coordinates: 55°11′30″N 4°27′5″W
- Primary inflows: Tunskeen Lane
- Primary outflows: Black Garpel, then Eglin Lane
- Surface elevation: ~285 m (935 ft)
- Islands: Eagles Isle, Blaeberry Isle, Deer Isle

Loch Macaterick is a loch in East Ayrshire, Scotland within Galloway Forest Park and Merrick Kells SSSI. The loch is situated to the north of Macaterick (499 m), to the west of Craigfionn (366 m) and to the southeast of Loch Riecawr. It is considered relatively oligotrophic.

Loch Macaterick from Craigfionn

A boardwalk through a forested area used to lead to the loch from a nearby track but it was removed during forestry works. The loch area has suffered limited heather beetle impacts.
