= Nether Horsburgh Castle =

Coordinates: 55.6449°N 3.1074°W

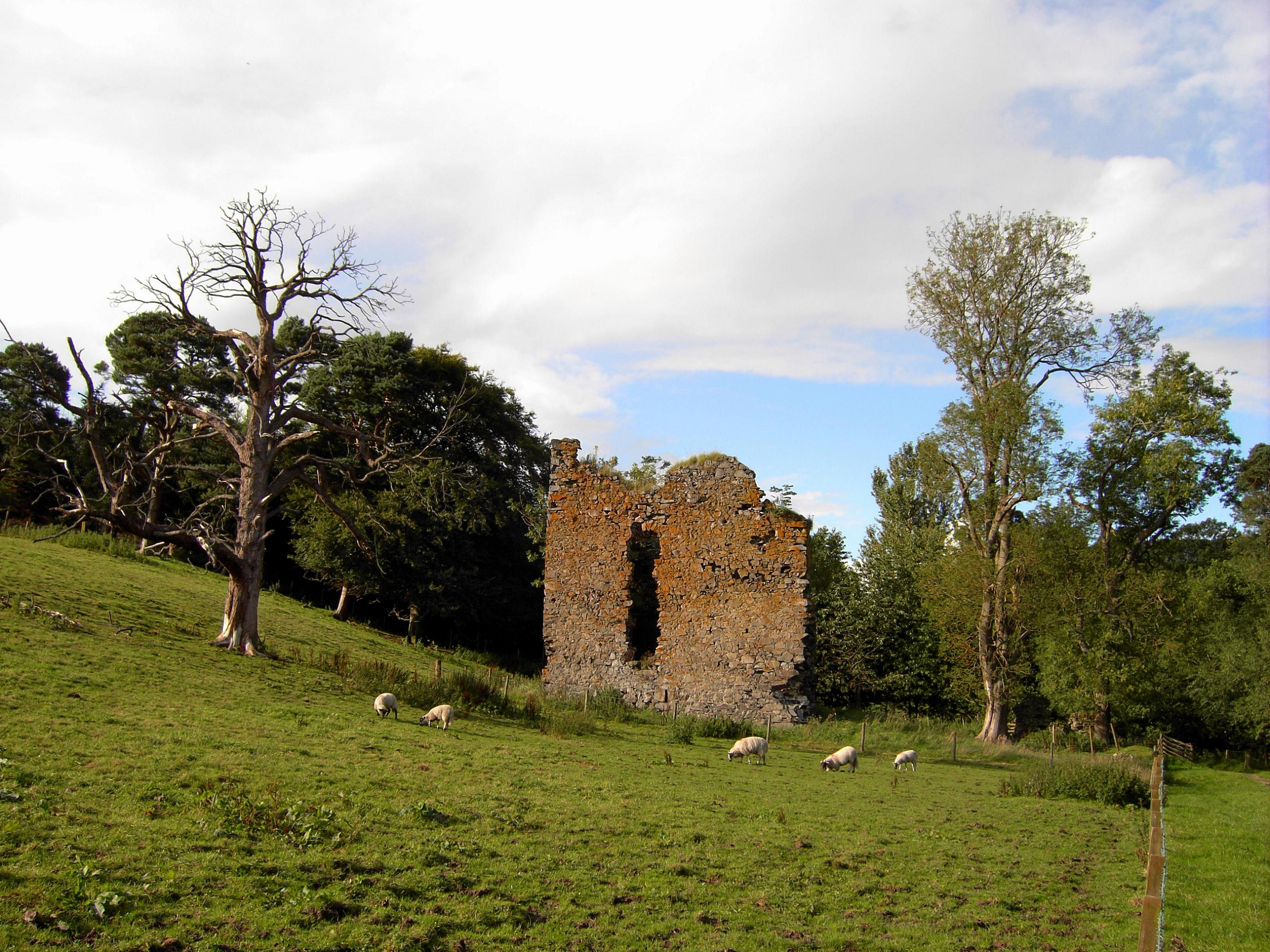
The ruins from the east

Nether Horsburgh Castle is a ruined tower house near Cardrona, in the Scottish Borders, in the former county of Peeblesshire. It is situated at the back of a farmstead, 3.5 miles (5.6 km) southwest of the market town of Peebles, at grid reference grid reference NT304396, on the A72 road. Access may be gained by permission from the adjoining farmstead, Nether Horsburgh Farm.

== Description ==
The remains of Nether Horsburgh Castle consist of a ruined, 16th-century rectangular tower-house, at the foot of a rolling valley overlooking the River Tweed, with the Hope Burn flowing just a few meters to the east. Originally, the tower had an adjoining courtyard and ranges of buildings, traces of which can still be seen to the north of the tower.

Only three walls still survive, reaching a height of about 12 metres (39 ft), with the east wall being completely ruined to ground level. The existing structure appears to have measured about 10 metres (33 ft) by 8 metres (26 ft), with walls of about 1.2 metres (3.9 ft) thick. It is thought that the tower rose to a height of four stories, with an entrance situated at ground level on the northeast side of the building. This led into a vaulted cellar, studded with slit window apertures. Evidence suggests that access to the upper floors was gained by a staircase situated in the east wall.

A small courtyard was formed by a range of buildings continuing to the east for about 14 metres (46 ft), then north for about 22 metres (72 ft). All that remains of this is a small fragment of the northern segment, which now forms a part of the field boundary in which the castle stands.

The site is protected as a scheduled monument.

== History ==
The castle was built and occupied by the Borders family of Horsburgh, and was later sold to Sir Robert Stewart of Shillingshaws, due to diminished family fortunes.

Other castles owned by the Horsburgh family are to be found in the same part of Peeblesshire. Less than 1 mile (1.6 km) to the west, on a grassy knoll, stands the remains of a small tower and wing. This is Horsburgh Castle, also of the 16th century, and just north of Peebles, high on the side of Mailingsland Hill, stands the remains of Hutchinfield Tower. A very dilapidated oblong block, again this is of the 16th century.

== Photographs of the ruins ==
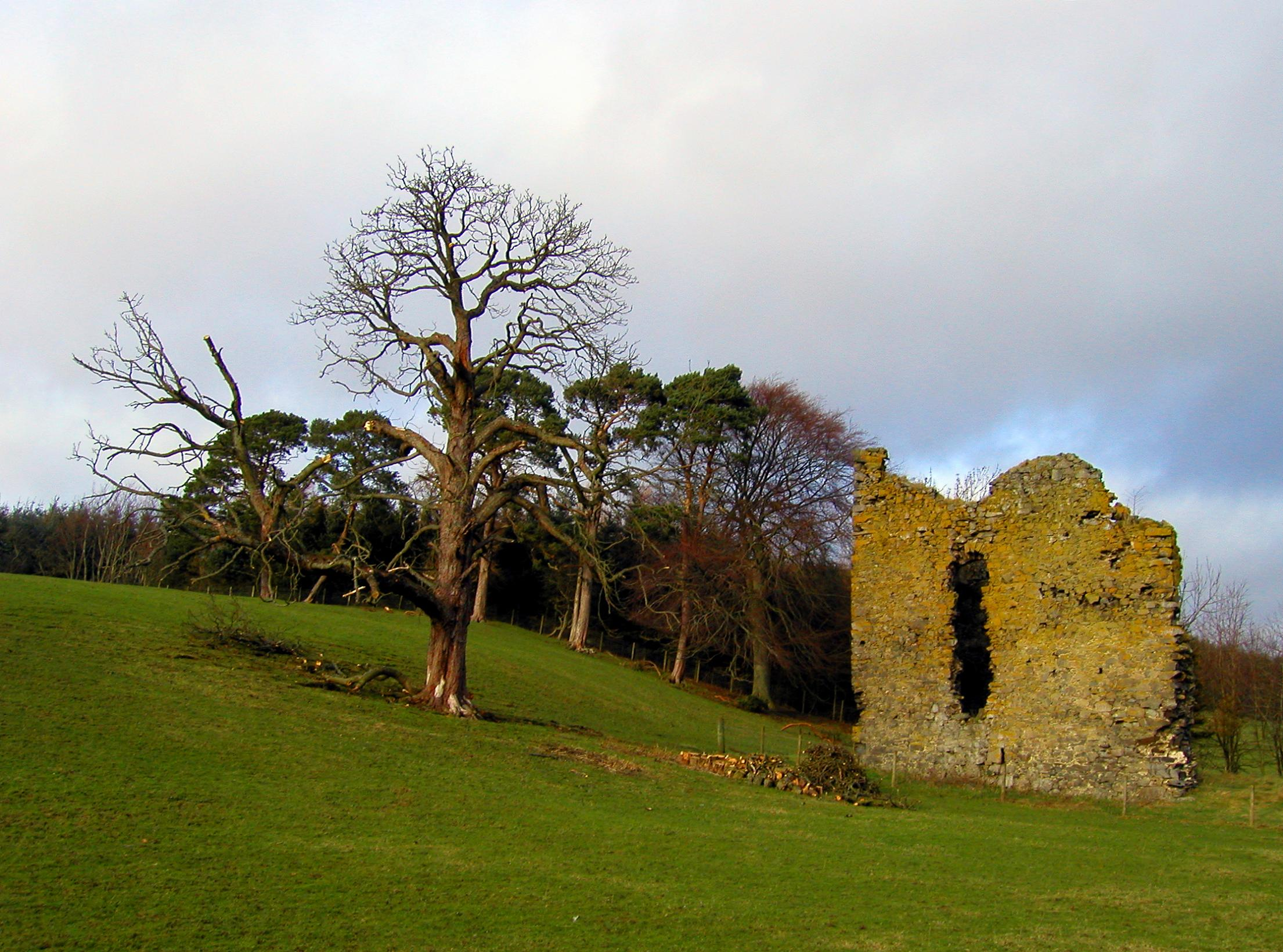
The castle from the east

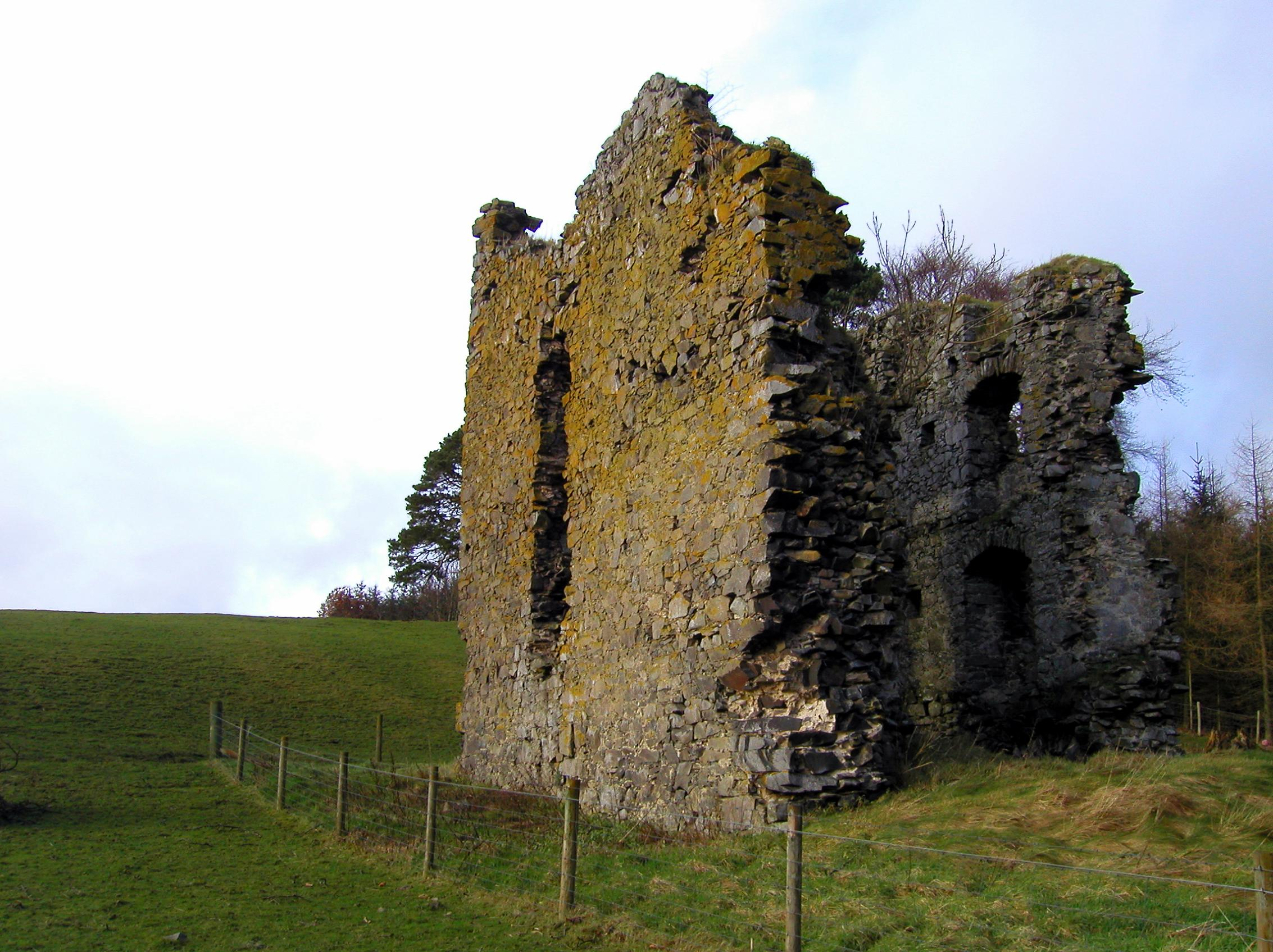
Southeast view

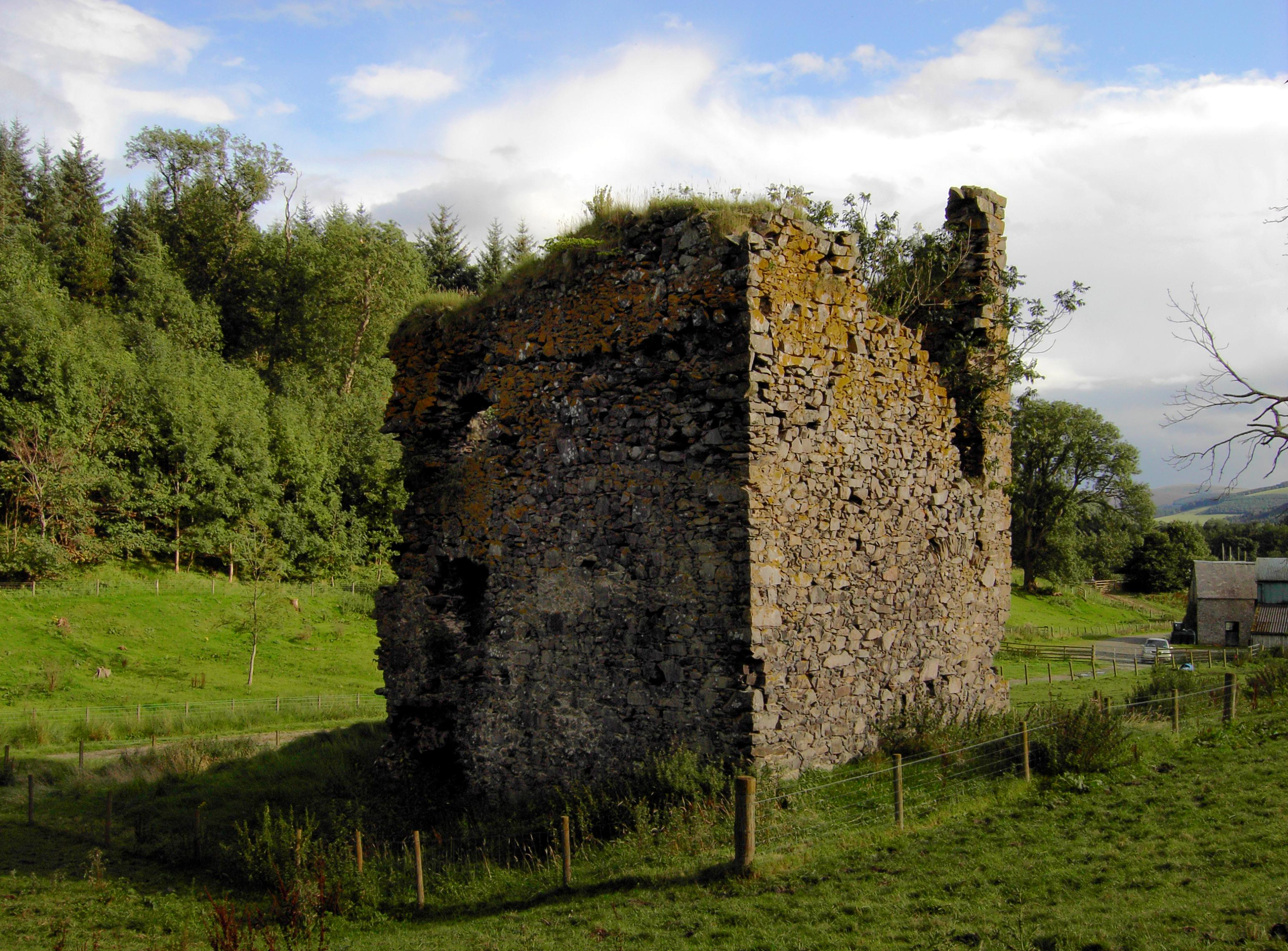
Northwest view

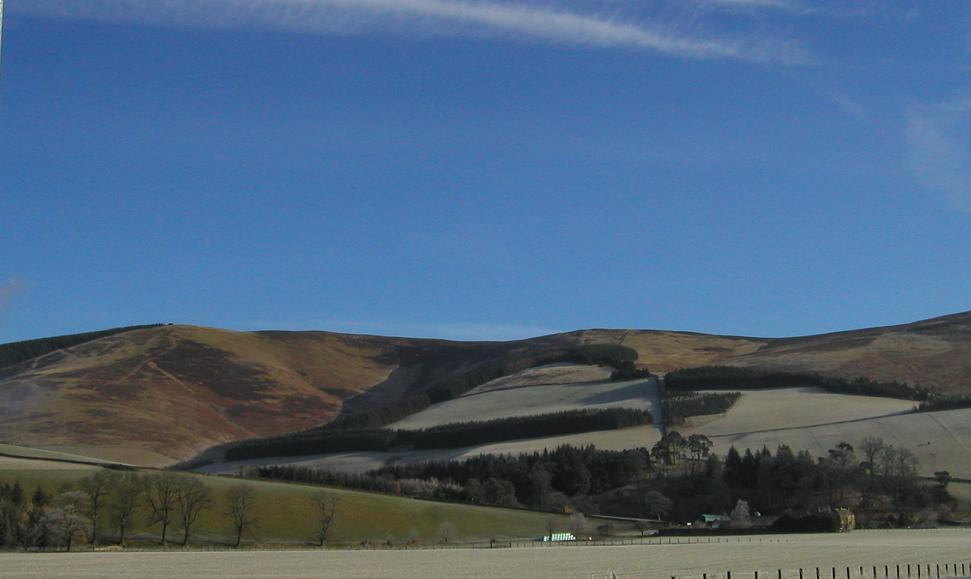
Castle is to the left of farm.

== See also ==
- List of places in the Scottish Borders
