= Tweed Valley Forest Park =

Forested area

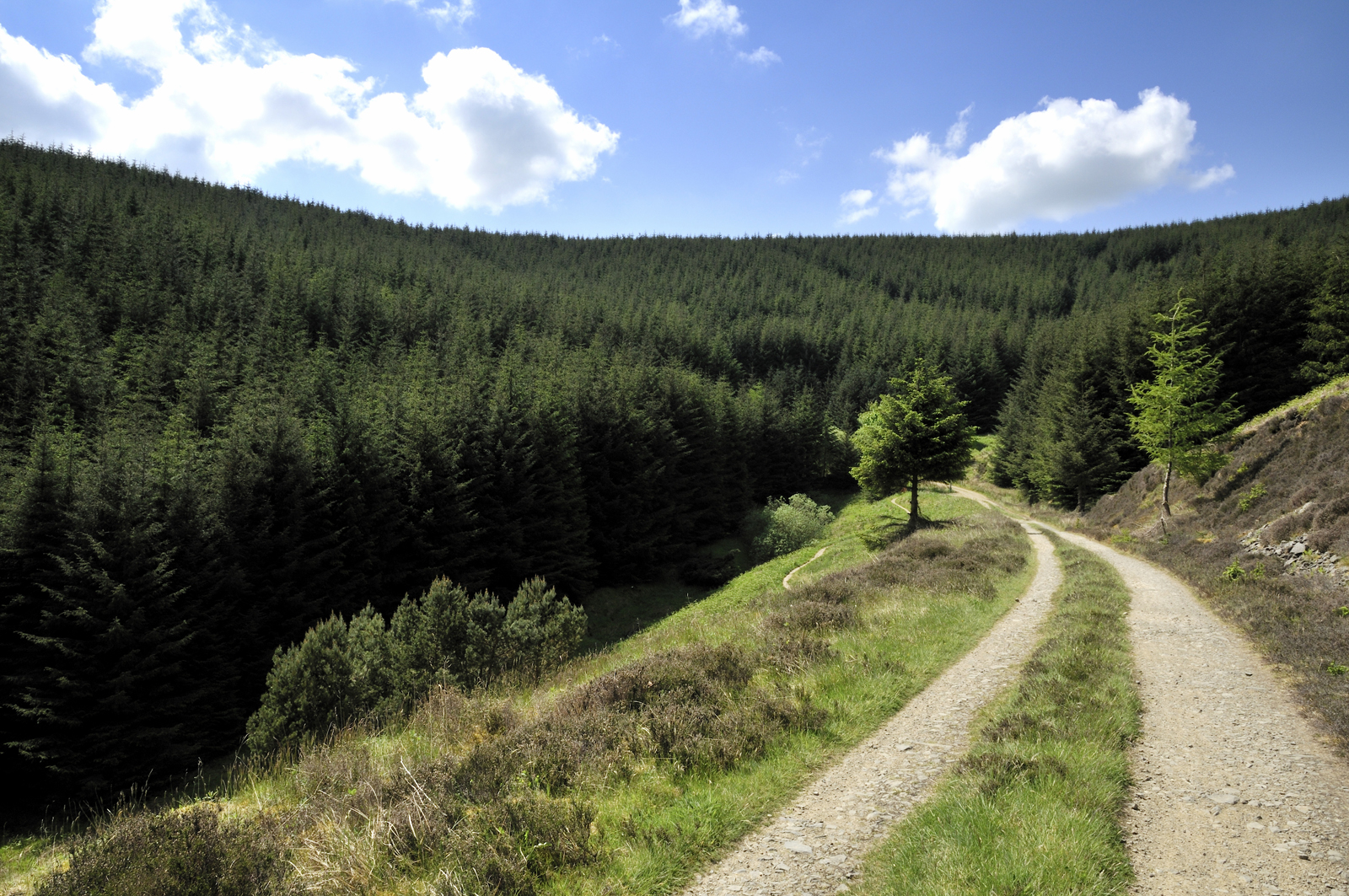
- Glentress Forest

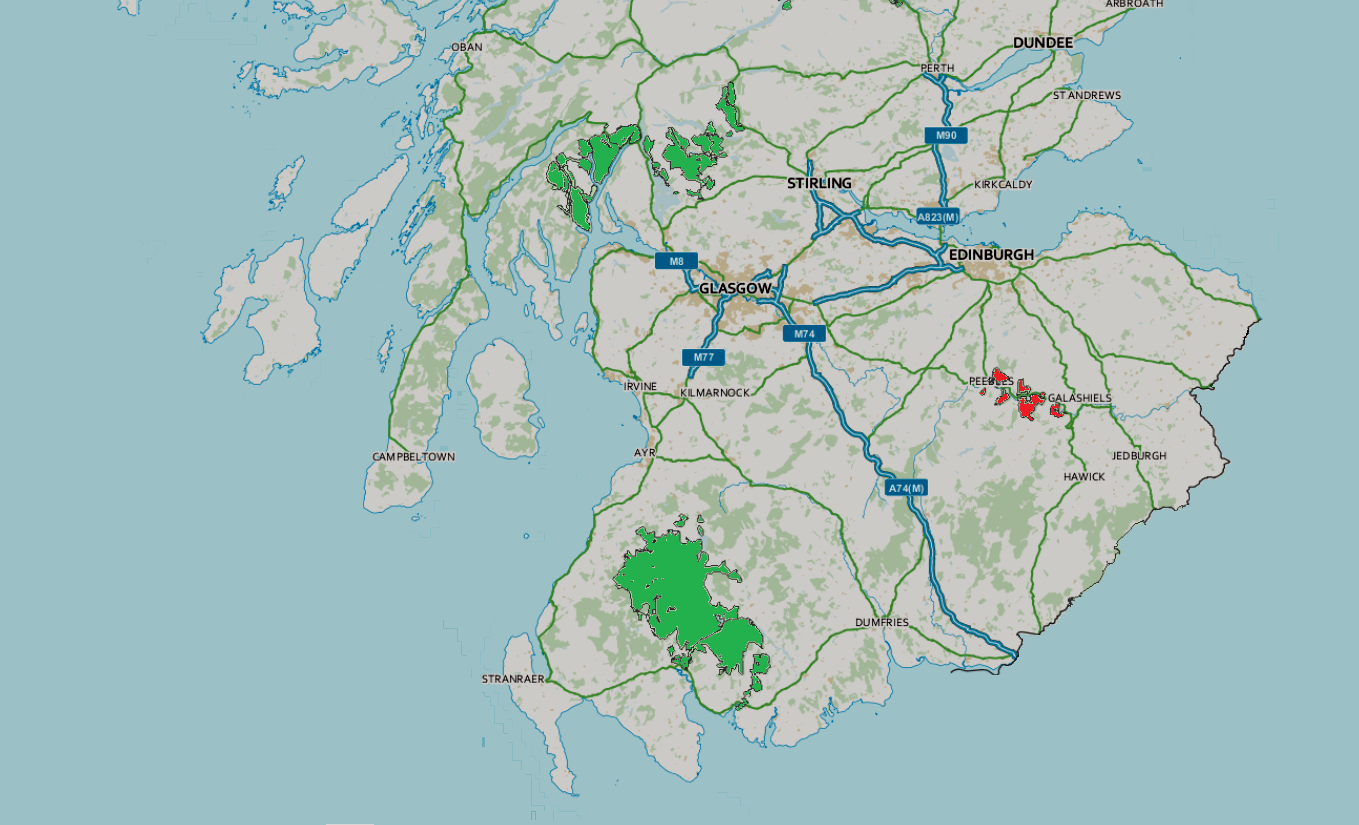
- The location of the Tweed Valley Forest Park in southern Scotland (in red, other forests parks shown in green).
- Location: Scottish Borders, Scotland
- Coordinates: 55°41′N 3°08′W
- Area: 6,365 ha (24.58 sq mi)
- Established: 2002
- Governing body: Forestry and Land Scotland

Tweed Valley Forest Park is forest park in the border region of Scotland. It consists of a network of eight forests managed by Forestry and Land Scotland (FLS) spread along the valley of the River Tweed, and which are managed with an emphasis on recreational facilities for visitors.

The forest park was established in 2002, and covers 64 square kilometres (25 mi^{2}).

At each location there is a car park and waymarked trails for visitors. Some of the site have more facilities, such as toilets and mountain bike trails. The eight forests are:

- Caberston
- Cademuir
- Cardrona
- Glenkinnon
- Glentress - also part of the 7stanes network of mountain bike centres
- Innerleithen - also part of the 7stanes network of mountain bike centres
- Thornielee
- Yair
