= Scottish Dark Sky Observatory =

Scottish observatory

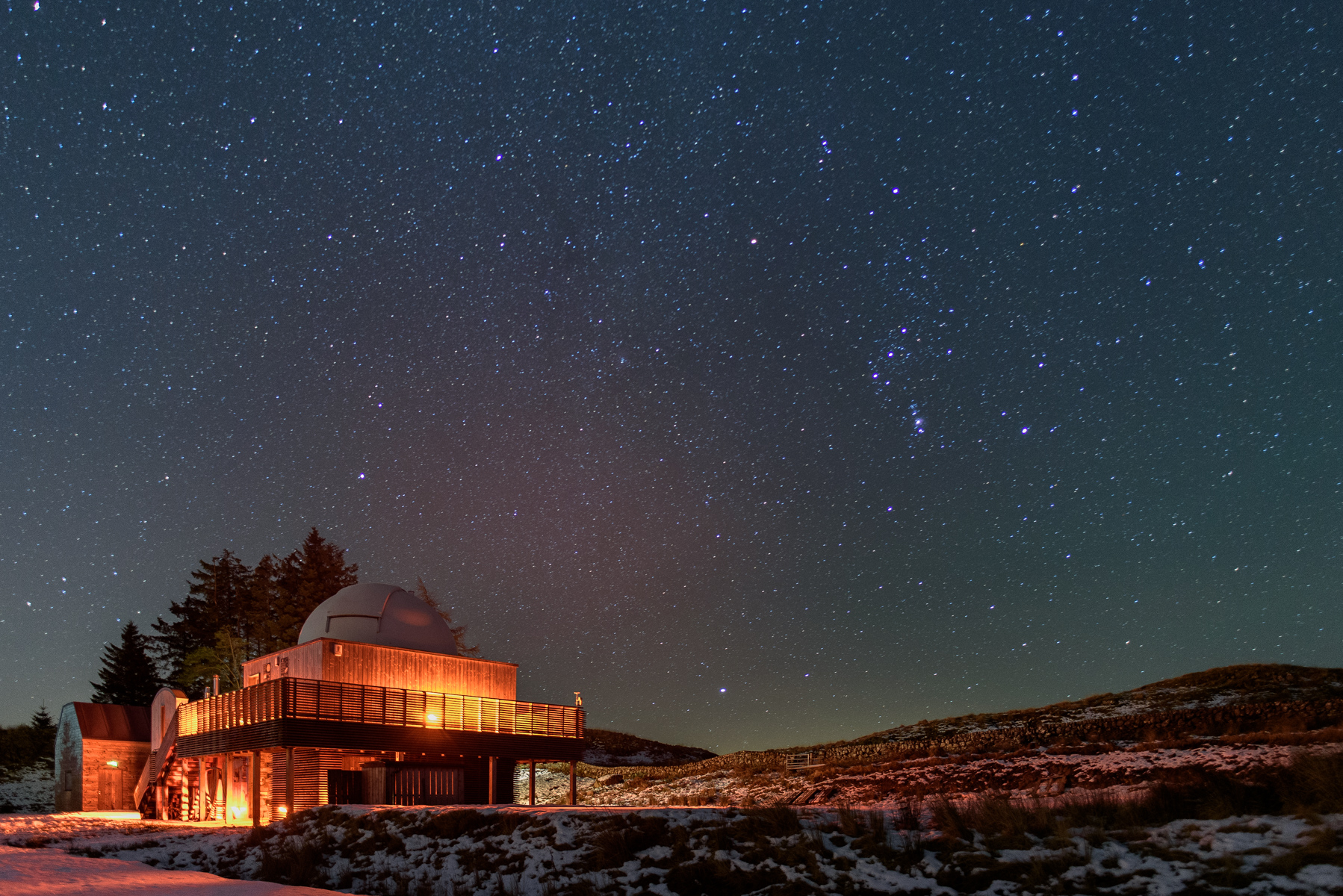
- Scottish Dark Sky Observatory
- Organization: Dark Sky Observatory Group Ltd
- Location: (formerly), Loch Doon, East Ayrshire, Scotland
- Coordinates: 55°17′28″N 4°24′17″W
- Altitude: 253 m (830 ft)
- Established: 2012 (destroyed by fire 2021)
- Website: Dark Sky Observatory
- Related media on Commons

The Scottish Dark Sky Observatory (SDSO) was an astronomical observatory located near Loch Doon, East Ayrshire, Scotland. It was situated on a hilltop site near the village of Dalmellington. The site is located in the northern edge of the Galloway Forest's Dark Sky Park, and within the Galloway and Southern Ayrshire UNESCO Biosphere, enjoying relatively low levels of light pollution.

The observatory was constructed during 2012 and was officially opened by the First Minister of Scotland, the late Alex Salmond. The building and facilities were extended in 2017 with the addition of a digital planetarium, officially opened by the Lord Lieutenant of Ayrshire and Arran John Duncan.

The SDSO was open year round with its principal aim being to encourage and allow people of all ages and abilities to learn about and experience the wonders of astronomy and space. It was seen as a valuable and unique educational asset for the region.

The SDSO suffered a devastating fire during the early hours of 23 June 2021. The fire was treated as suspicious.

In late 2023, following the results of an independent feasibility study, the Board of Trustees of the SDSO confirmed that, for a number of reasons, the observatory will not be rebuilt on its former site.

The SDSO have successfully completed the purchase of a former FLS visitor centre at Clatteringshaws Loch. When built, the new £1.5m observatory will include two observing domes, a planetarium, a gift shop and a small cafe.

The Astronomer Royal for Scotland, Prof Catherine Heymans, is the observatory's Patron.
