= Horsburgh (surname) =

Horsburgh is a surname. Notable people with the surname include:

- Benjamin Horsburgh (1868–1935), former Governor of Ceylon
- Corey Horsburgh (born 1998), Australian rugby league footballer
- David Horsburgh (1923–1984), British educationist
- Ellice Horsburgh (1870–1935), Scottish mathematician and engineer
- Erin Horsburgh, woman who claimed to be Azaria Chamberlain, a baby girl whose body was never found
- Gavin Horsburgh (born 1997), Scottish and British rower
- George Horsburgh (1910–1988), Scotland international rugby union player
- James Horsburgh (1762–1836), Scottish hydrographer
- John Horsburgh (1791–1869), Scottish engraver
- Lynette Horsburgh (born 1974), Scottish semi-professional pool and snooker player
- Margaret Horsburgh (born 1943), New Zealand academic
- Meica Horsburgh (born 1989), Australian goalball player
- Michael Horsburgh (born 1958), former Australian rules footballer
- Wayne Horsburgh (born 1955), Australian country music entertainer

== See also ==
- Horsburgh (disambiguation)
- Horsbrugh (surname)
