= Kirroughtree =

Mountain biking routes in Galloway, Scotland

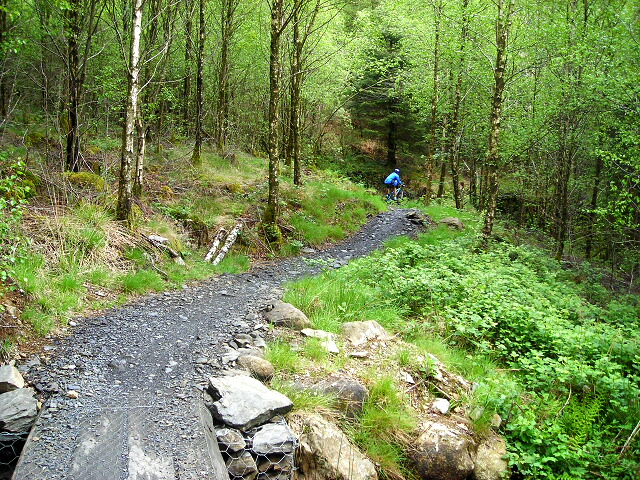
- Cycle Trail in Kirroughtree Forest

- Location within Scotland
- Interactive map of Kirroughtree

Geography
- Location: Dumfries and Galloway, Scotland
- Coordinates: 54°57′14″N 4°25′18″W

Kirroughtree Forest is located near Newton Stewart in Dumfries and Galloway, southwest Scotland and overlooks the Irish Sea. It is managed by Forestry and Land Scotland and is part of the Galloway Forest Park. It has been developed as a centre for mountain biking trails.

Palnure Burn is a small river which runs through the forest and on into the River Cree. The forest is home to red squirrels, red deer and ospreys.

== Tourism ==
Kirroughtree attracts about 78,000 visitors a year.

=== Mountain biking ===
Kirroughtree is a mountain biking centre, which is one of 7 venues of the 7Stanes project throughout the Scottish Borders and Dumfries and Galloway. 7stanes was started by the Forestry Commission in 2001. Chris Ross of the Forestry Commission led the design and construction of the Kirroughtree trails. Glentrool is another 7 stanes site within Galloway Forest Park, an officially designated Dark Sky Park area.

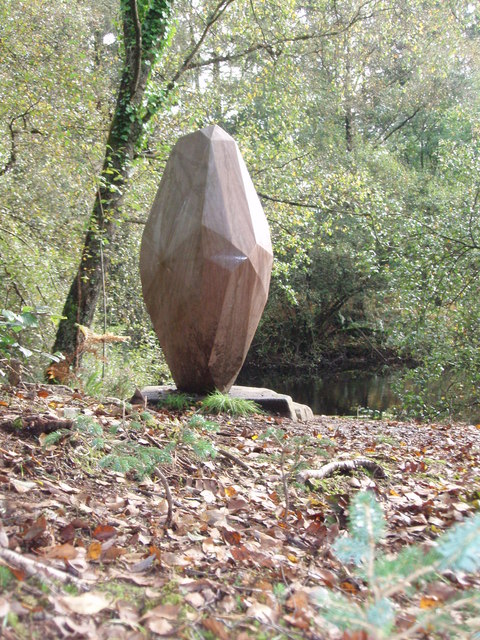
The Gem Stane at Kirroughtree

Known as the 7stanes because each venue features a 'stane' (Scots for stone), created by artist Gordon Young. The 'Gem Stane' at Kirroughtree is a 1.75 ton stone sculpture made from Scottish pink quartz. Kirroughtree's trails are known as the 7stanes' hidden gem, and the forest is close to the Creetown Gem Rock Museum.

Kirroughtree was winner of MBR Trail of the Year in 2010. A new trail centre with restaurant and bike shop/hire was opened in 2014.

Kirroughtree has several cross-country XC trails (graded for varying levels of experience) and a skills area for practising mountain biking techniques:

- Bargary Wood: green (easy), 3.8 miles (6.0 km), 10% singletrack
- Larg Hill: blue (moderate), 6.3 miles (10.0 km), 50% singletrack, with Doon Hill extension: 2.5 miles (4.0 km), 10% singletrack
- The Twister: red (difficult), 10.6 miles (17.0 km), 85% singletrack
- Black Craigs (an extension to The Twister loop): black (severe/expert), 8.7 miles (14.0 km), 75% singletrack. The highlight is the unique 'McMoab' granite outcrop, with its huge slabs and ridges linked by boulder causeways. McMoab is named after the world famous mountain biking area at Moab, Utah in USA. The gruelling climb of 'Heartbreak Hill' leads on to several downhill sections including the challenging 'Hissing Sid'.

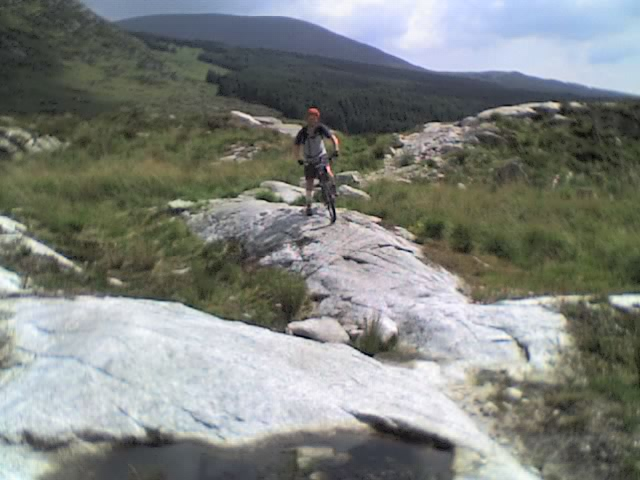
McMoab at Kirroughtree MTB Trail

=== Long distance cycle route ===
National Cycle Route 7 (running 200 miles from Glasgow to Carlisle via Dumfries and Glen Trool) winds through the Forest Park.

=== Fishing ===
There are several locations for fishing in the Forest Park (mostly for brown trout and pike), at Loch Braden, Loch Dee, Black Loch, Spectacle Loch and Garwachie.
