= Balgownie Wood =

Wood in Culross, Fife, Scotland

Coordinates: 56°04′38″N 3°37′43″W

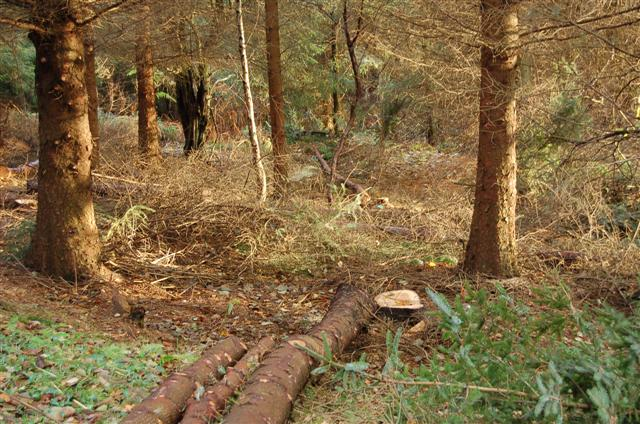

Balgownie Wood is a woodland in West Fife, Scotland, south of the village of Blairhall and east of Balgownie Mains. The woods used to belong to nearby Culross Abbey.
