= Forest parks of Scotland =

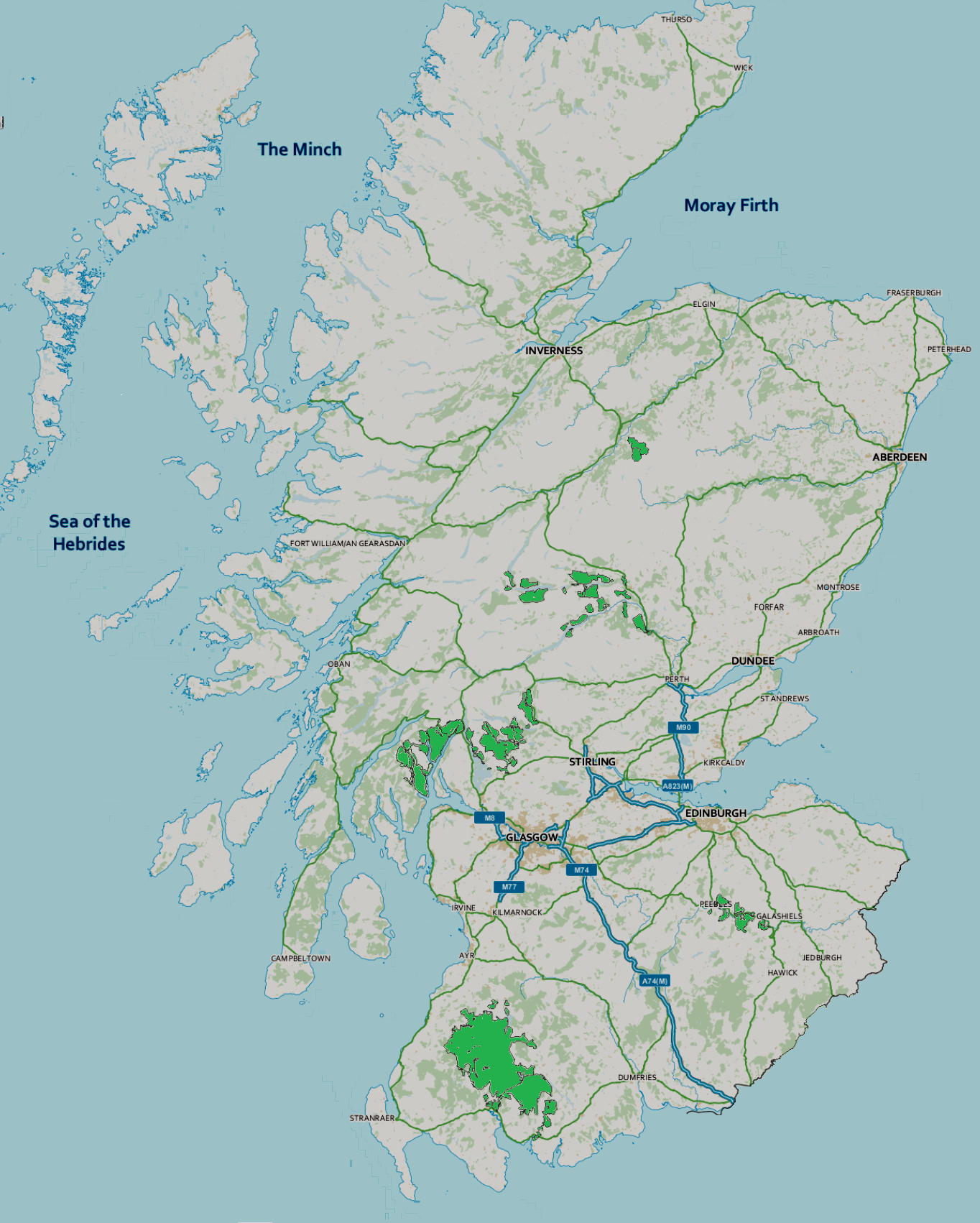
A map of the forest parks of Scotland

Forest parks are areas of forest managed by Forestry and Land Scotland (FLS) that are managed for multiple benefits, with an emphasis on recreation facilities for visitors. There are currently six forest parks in Scotland.

The first forest park was the Argyll Forest Park, on the Cowal peninsula, which was established in 1935. The largest is the Galloway Forest Park, at 774 square kilometres (299 sq mi).

== List of forest parks ==
Name	Area (ha)	Area (km^{2})	Date established	Council area
Argyll Forest Park	21,133	211.33	1935	Argyll and Bute
Galloway Forest Park	77,396	773.96	1947	Dumfries and Galloway
Glenmore Forest Park	3,566	35.66	1948	Highland
Queen Elizabeth Forest Park	19,665	196.65	1953	Stirling
Tay Forest Park	19,366	193.66		Perth and Kinross
Tweed Valley Forest Park	6,365	63.65	2002	Scottish Borders
