= Horsbrugh =

Horsbrugh is a surname. Notable people with the surname include:

- Andrew Horsbrugh-Porter (1907-1986), British Army officer and member of the Horsbrugh-Porter baronets
- Boyd Robert Horsbrugh (1871–1916), English ornithologist and military officer
- Florence Horsbrugh, Baroness Horsbrugh (1889–1969), Scottish politician
- Oliver Horsbrugh (1937–2009), British television director
- Patrick Horsbrugh (1920–2014), British architecture professor

== See also ==
- Horsburgh (surname)
- Horsbrugh-Porter baronets
