= Galloway Forest Park =

Dark-sky preserve in Dumfries and Galloway, Scotland

Coordinates: 55.123861°N 4.423901°W

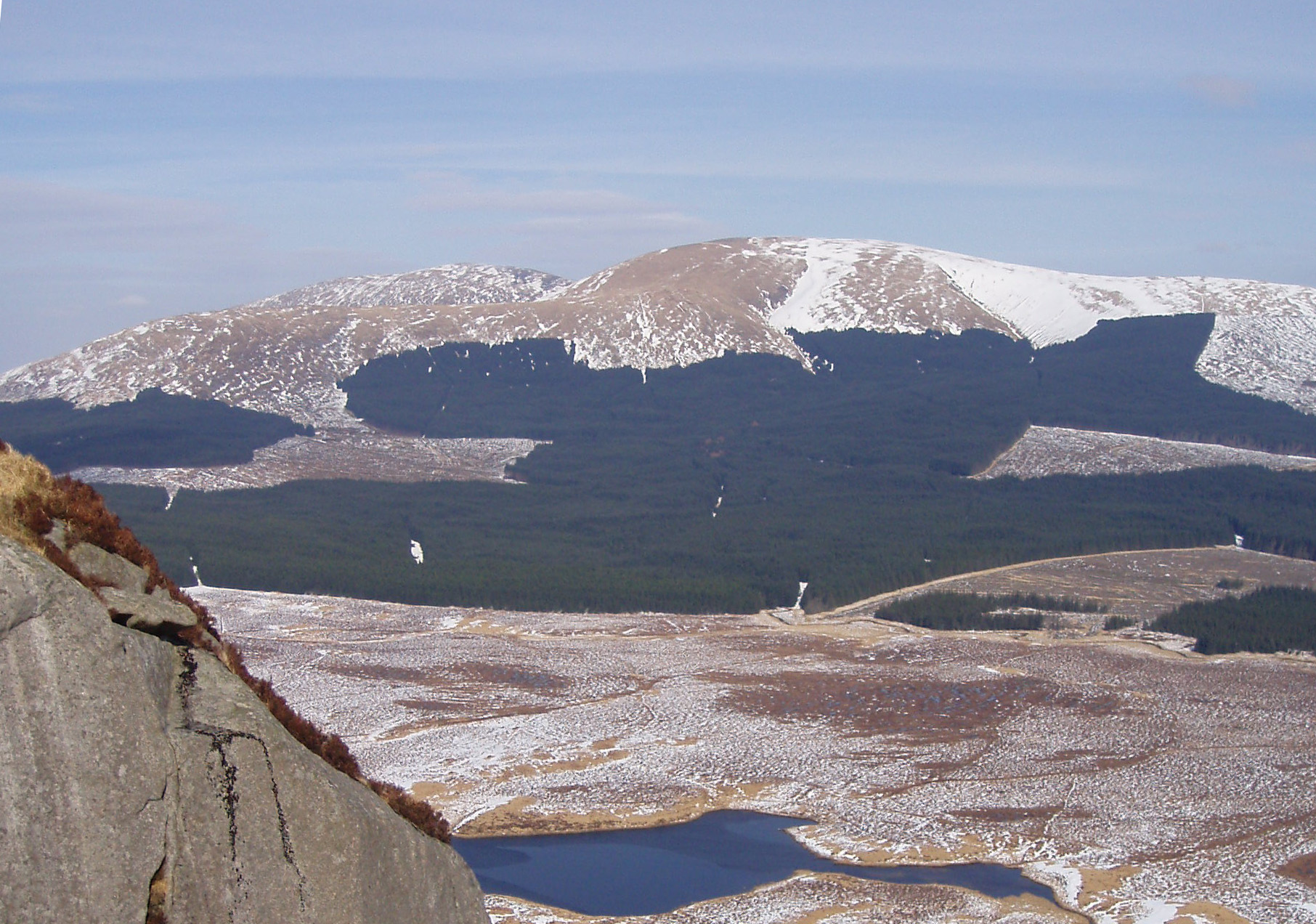
- Corserine and the Rhinns of Kells as seen from Craignaw in winter, showing areas of Sitka Spruce plantation.

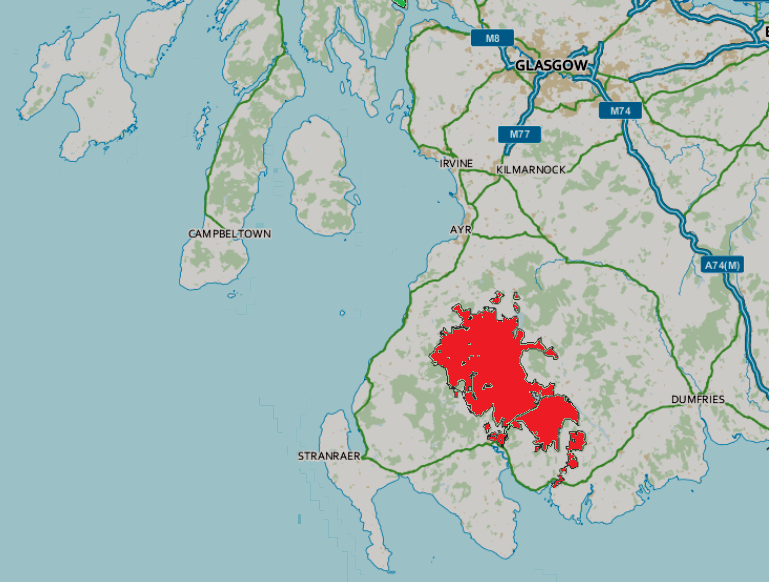
- A map showing the location of the Galloway Forest Park (in red) in south west Scotland.
- Location: Dumfries and Galloway
- Area: 774 km^{2} (299 sq mi)
- Established: 1947
- Governing body: Forestry and Land Scotland

Galloway Forest Park is a forest park operated by Forestry and Land Scotland, principally covering woodland in the historic counties of Kirkcudbrightshire and Wigtownshire in the administrative area of Dumfries and Galloway. It is claimed to be the largest forest in the UK. The park was granted Dark Sky Park status ("Galloway Forest Dark Sky Park") in November 2009, being the first area in the UK to be so designated.

The park, established in 1947, covers 774 square kilometres (299 mi^{2}) and receives over 800,000 visitors per year. The two visitor centres at Glen Trool and Kirroughtree receive around 150,000 visitors each year. The third visitor centre at Clatteringshaws was sold in late 2024 to the Scottish Dark Sky Observatory for redevelopment and is expected to re-open in 2027. Much of the Galloway Hills lie within the boundaries of the park and there is good but rough hillwalking and also some rock climbing and ice-climbing within the park. Within or near the boundaries of the park are several well developed mountain bike tracks, forming part of the 7stanes project.

As well as catering for recreation, the park includes economically valuable woodland, producing 500,000 tons of timber per year.

Galloway Forest Park and the people who visit it and work in it were the subject of a six-part BBC One documentary series aired in early 2018 entitled "The Forest".

== Dark sky ==
In November 2009 the International Dark-Sky Association conferred 'gold tier' Dark Sky Park status on the Galloway Forest Park, the first area in the UK to be so designated.

The Scottish Dark Sky Observatory, formerly located near Loch Doon, was located within the northern edge of the Galloway Forest Dark Sky Park. The observatory was partly funded by the Scottish Government and opened in 2012. It suffered a devastating fire during the early hours of 23 June 2021, resulting in complete destruction of the observatory. Police stated that the fire was considered suspicious. In late 2024 The Scottish Dark Sky Observatory purchased the former Clatteringshaws Visitor Centre and car park and plans are being prepared to redevelop the site to create an astronomical observatory, planetarium and engagement centre, expected to open in 2027.

== Alexander Murray ==
The park is also home to the ruins of the birthplace of Alexander Murray, the son of a shepherd and farm labourer. Murray was self-taught on multiple languages, and eventually went on to become professor of Oriental languages at University of Edinburgh. A short distance away, high on a hillside, is Murray's Monument, which was erected in his memory in 1835.

== Typhoon crash ==
On 18 March 1944, 22-year-old Canadian pilot Kenneth Mitchell crashed his Hawker Typhoon aircraft in the forest. The impact killed him instantly. Mitchell was in training in preparation for his squadron's role fighting the German V-1 flying bombs in the Second World War. On 18 March 2009, 65 years to the day since the crash, a commemorative plaque was installed on a mortared cairn at the crash site, where pieces of the aircraft still remain.

== See also ==
- Loch Macaterick
