= Horsburgh Castle =

Coordinates: 55°38′26.25″N 3°8′12.04″W

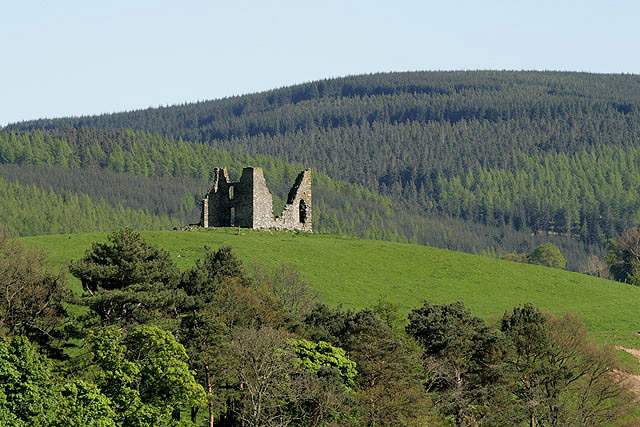
Horsburgh Castle

Horsburgh Castle, also known as Horsbrugh Castle or Horsbrugh Tower, is a ruined tower house castle by the River Tweed, on the A72 road from Peebles to Galashiels, near Glentress in the Scottish Borders area of Scotland. The ruins date from the 16th century and was built by the Horsburghs.

The villages of Over Horsbrugh, Nether Horsburgh, Kailzie, and Kailzie Gardens are close by, as is the ruined Nether Horsburgh Castle.

== Differences in spelling ==
The Ordnance Survey Landranger Map 73 shows Horsbrugh Castle and Horsbrugh Ford, whereas the nearby hamlet is Nether Horsburgh. The Royal Commission on the Ancient and Historical Monuments of Scotland (RCAHMS) although listing the castle as Horsburgh Castle, states that "The name is undoubtedly Horsbrugh Castle confirmed by spelling of local farm name etc., also plaque on wall of ruins of castle stating: A memorial to RT Hon Baroness Horsbrugh of Horsbrugh 1889-1969." The site is more commonly known as Horsburgh Castle by many sources.

It has been designated a scheduled monument by Historic Environment Scotland.

== See also ==
- List of places in the Scottish Borders
- Scheduled monuments in the Scottish Borders
