= Clatteringshaws Loch =

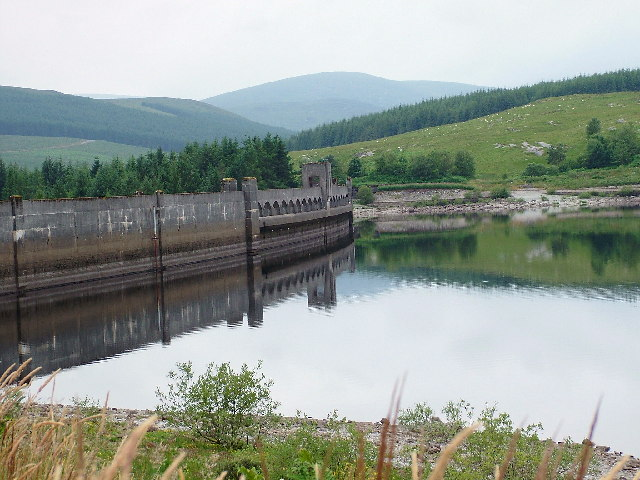
- Clatteringshaws Dam, looking towards Cairnsmore of Fleet

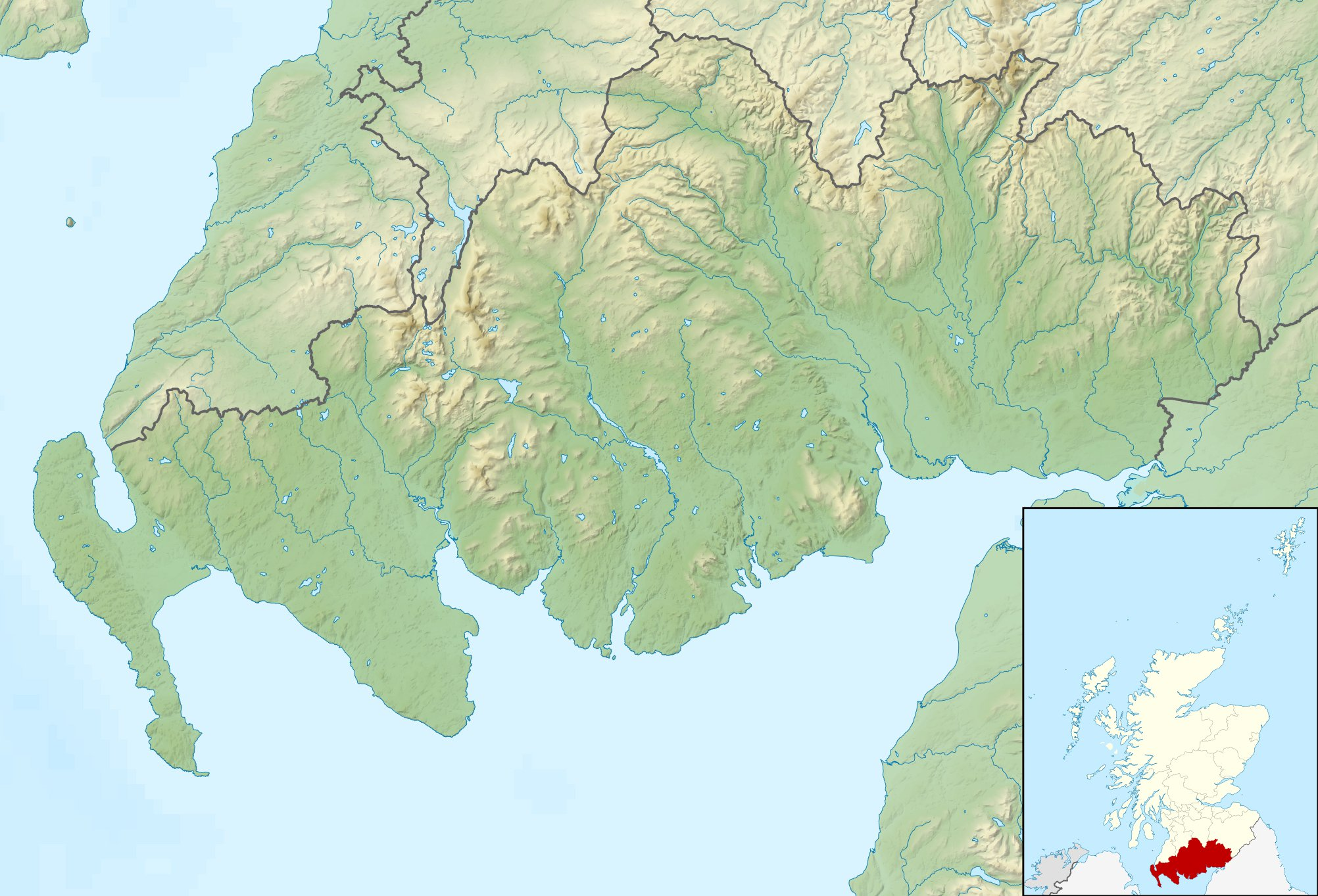
- Location within Dumfries and Galloway
- Location: Dumfries and Galloway, Scotland
- Coordinates: 55.066°N 4.284°W
- Type: reservoir
- Primary inflows: River Dee
- Primary outflows: River Dee
- Basin countries: United Kingdom

Clatteringshaws Loch is a freshwater reservoir in the historical county of The Stewartry of Kirkcudbright in Dumfries and Galloway, Scotland. It was created by damming the Galloway River Dee as part of the Galloway Hydro Electric Scheme.

The Forestry Commission used to maintain a visitors' centre by the loch to welcome visitors to Galloway Forest Park, however it closed in August 2023. The visitor centre has since been purchased by the Trustees of the Scottish Dark Sky Observatory (November 2024) and will soon be redeveloped to create an astronomical observatory which will take advantage of the spectacular dark skies enjoyed by the region.

== See also ==
- List of reservoirs and dams in the United Kingdom
