= Cardrona Forest =

Forest in Scottish Borders, Scotland

Coordinates: 55.620°N 3.109°W

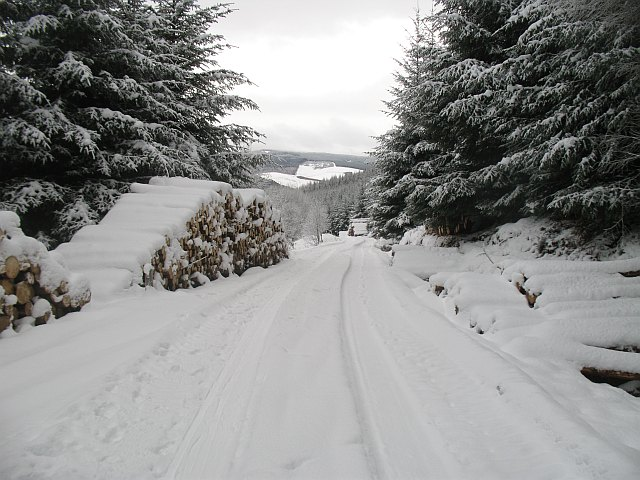
Cardrona Forest in winter, 2009

The Cardrona Forest is a forest in the Scottish Borders area of Scotland, on in Tweed Valley, near Peebles. A nearby forest is Glentress Forest. The forest contains 2,000 years of Scottish history, and is home to ruins. It is popular among cyclists and hikers, for it has a network of trails, many of which have names.

Cardrona Forest consists of a mixed conifer woodland with upgraded facilities. It is part of a portfolio of forests managed by Forestry and Land Scotland, including Hyndlee Forest, Swinnie Plantation, Innerleithen Forest, Elibank and Traquair, Yair Forest, Cademuir Forest, Craik Forest, Thornielee Forest, Glentress Forest, Caberston, and Newcastleton Forest.

== See also ==
- List of places in the Scottish Borders
