= Glentress Forest =

Forest in Scottish Borders, Scotland

Coordinates: 55°41′N 3°08′W

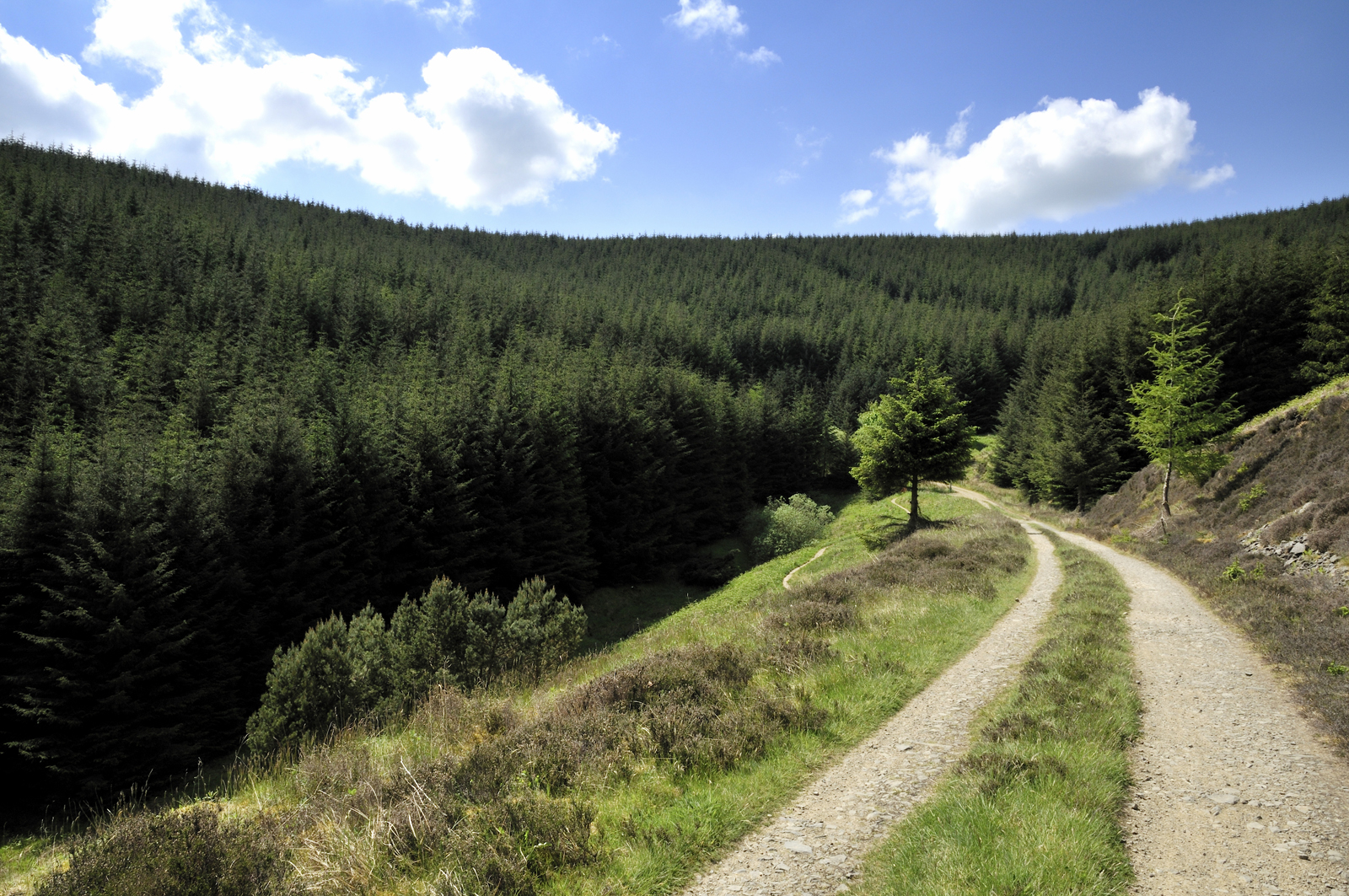
- Glentress Forest
- Interactive map of Glentress Forest
- Location: Tweed Valley, Scottish Borders
- Governing body: Forestry and Land Scotland
- Website: Glentress Forest

Glentress Forest lies east of Peebles in the Scottish Borders, about 30 miles south of Edinburgh. Part of the Tweed Valley Forest Park along with Traquair Forest in Innerleithen, it is the home of a mountain biking centre. The forest is at the southern end of the Moorfoot Hills and is accessed from Glentress hamlet, which is on the A72 road.

== History ==
There are remains of an Iron Age hill fort at the top of Janet's Brae which offers a spectacular vista over the town of Peebles. The forest was planted in the 1920s in response to the national shortage of timber brought about by the First World War. Some of the original stands of Douglas Fir remain to this day.

During the 1930s, unemployed men were set to work in Glentress Forest, breaking ground, building tracks, and undertaking other heavy labour. The men lived in a work camp at Eshiels, which was one of a number of so-called Instructional Centres run by the Ministry of Labour in order to 'harden' young men who had been out of work for some time. By 1938, the ministry was operating 35 Instructional Centres across Britain, with a total capacity of over 6,000 places. By 1939, unemployment was declining in the face of impending war, and the Ministry closed its work camps.

== Bike trails ==
The mountain biking centre is one of the 7stanes mountain bike trails operated throughout southern Scotland by Forestry and Land Scotland.

There are currently five mountain bike waymarked routes and a freeride park in Glentress Forest. The historic cycle trails, aimed at children and families, provide a way to explore the forest and its history. The blue, red, and black mountain bike routes provide a challenge for all abilities. The red route is noted for a high-speed section with many bermed corners, known as Spooky Woods. The green trail is a "skills loop", and is designed for those new to mountain biking, although there are some challenges for those wishing to practice rocky sections or raised wooden trails too.

The UCI MTB World Championships were held at Glentress in August 2023, when the winners were Pauline Ferrand-Prévot and Tom Pidcock.

== See also ==
- List of places in the Scottish Borders
- List of places in Scotland
