= Henry Dobson (disambiguation) =

Henry Dobson (1841–1918) was an Australian politician.

Henry Dobson may also refer to:

- Henry Raeburn Dobson (1901–1985), portrait painter
- Henry Austin Dobson (1840–1921), English poet and essayist
- Henry Dobson (House)
- Henry John Dobson (1858–1928), Scottish artist

== Fiction ==
- List of House characters#Unsuccessful applicants for fellowship
