= Rhinns of Kells =

Range of hills in the Galloway Hills range in Scotland

Coordinates: 55°09′20″N 4°21′30″W

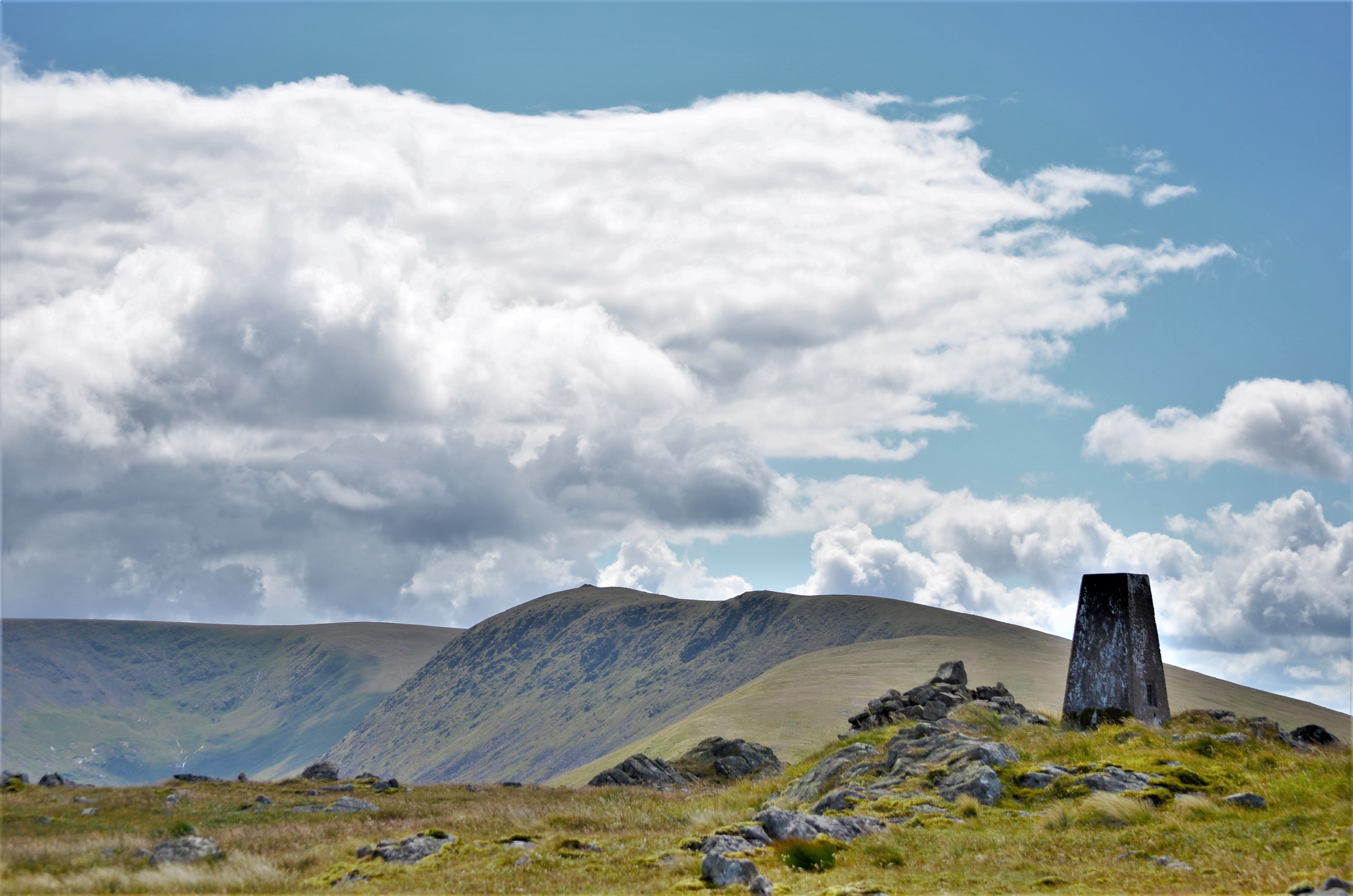
Corserine and Carlin's Cairn from the trig point on Meaul.

The Rhinns of Kells are a range of hills in the Galloway Hills range, part of the Southern Uplands of Scotland. The most easterly of three parallel ridges, they are neighboured to the west by the Range of the Awful Hand and the Dungeon Hills. The eastern portion of the Minnigaff Hills range lies immediately southwest of the range. In total, these four ranges are part of the Galloway Forest Park. The ridge is located entirely within Dumfries and Galloway, with the base of the western flanks being a northwestern boundary of the county.

Although distant, the ridge is paralleled to the east by the A713 road. This road provides access to the majority of the starting points for walking the ridge. Most commonly, these are Garryhorn Farm (the turnoff a few hundred metres north of Carsphairn) and Forrest Estate (accessed much further south a few kilometres north of St. John's Town of Dalry). Unclassified roads, one of which follows the Southern Upland Way, and two others near Clatteringshaws Loch can be utilised, but are much less common due to the difficult terrain when ascending or descending from the south. Due to the linear nature of the ridge, a full traverse will normally require two modes of transport positioned at either end if to be walked in a day. Shorter, circular rounds from Forrest Lodge are, as a result, more popular. A bus service by Houston's Minicoaches runs from Dalmellington to Castle Douglas via Carsphairn and St. John's Town of Dalry multiple times a day.

== The Hills ==
The hills of the range are the second-highest of the Galloway Hills, with the highest hill, Corserine, reaching 814 m. The terrain is similar to that of the Range of the Awful Hand in that the walking is predominantly along flat grass with occasional boggy sections, however the drops to the west and east are high, steep and often craggy. The ridge south of Corserine, which is named the Rhinns of Kells on OS maps – ignoring the northern portion, is notably rougher.

From north to south (ignoring all satellite ridges other than Cairnsgarroch) the hills are:

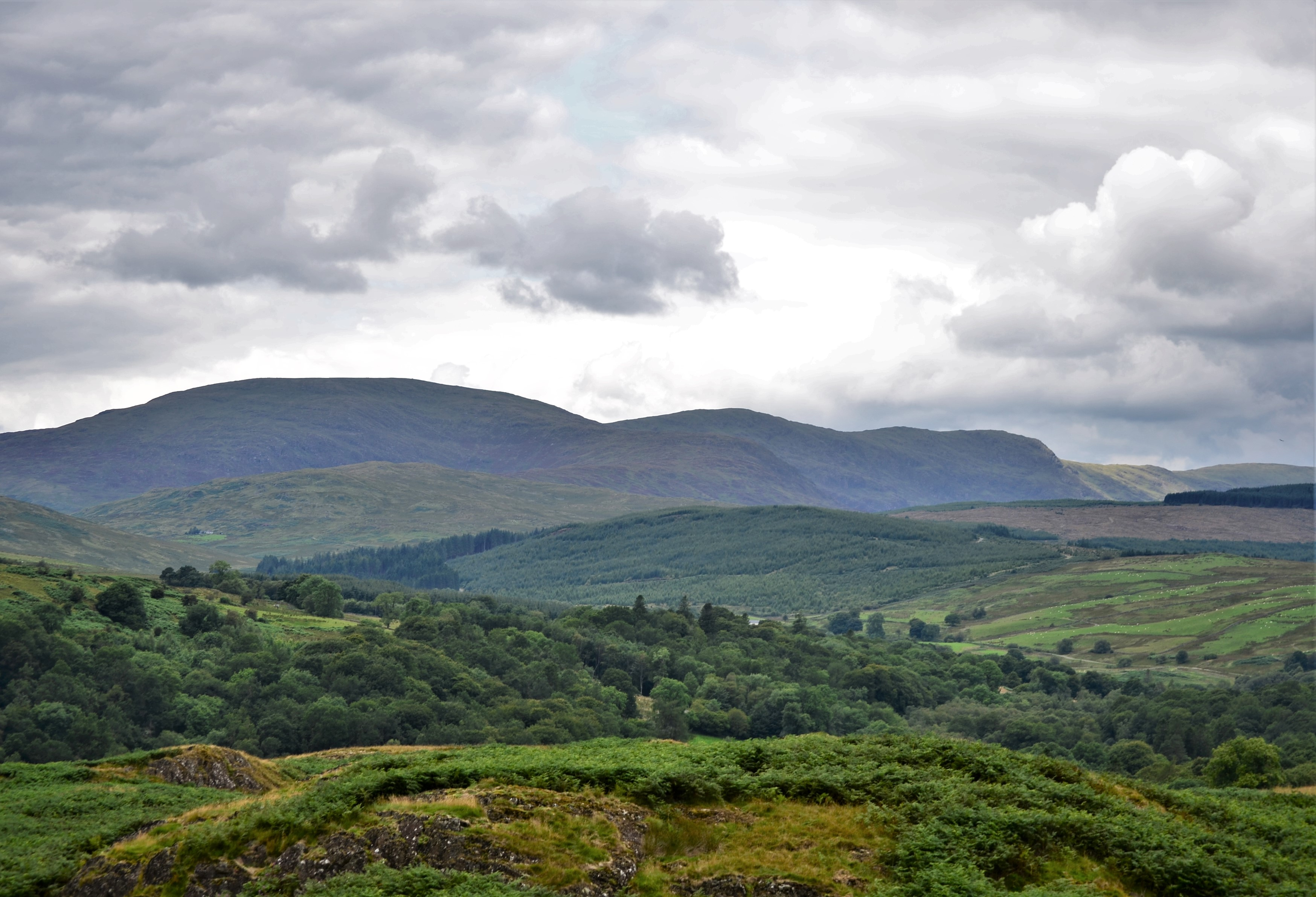
The Southern Rhinns of Kells from W of St. John's Town of Dalry

Summit	Height (m)	Listing
Cullendoch Hill	343	Tu,3
Craigencolon	346	Tu,3
Black Craig	528	Tu,5,DDew
Knockower	511	Tu,5,DDew
Coran of Portmark	623	Tu,Sim, D,GT,DN
Bow	613	Tu,Sim,DT,GT,DN
Cairnsgarroch	659	Hu,Tu,Sim,D,GT,DN,Y
Meaul	695	Tu,Sim, D,GT,DN
Carlin's Cairn	807	Tu,Sim,D,sHu,CT,DN
Corserine	814	Ma,Hu,Tu,Sim, C, D,DN,Y
Millfire	716	DT,sSim
Milldown	738	Tu,Sim, D,sHu,GT,DN
Meikle Millyea	748.64	Hu,Tu,Sim, D,GT,DN,Y
Little Millyea	578	Tu,5,DDew
Darrou	c. 470	-

== Ecology ==
The range forms part of the Silver Flowe-Merrick Kells Biosphere Reserve, which incorporates a considerable portion of both ranges to the west and east, and is a Natura 2000 site. The area is very popular with invertebrates and swarms of Odonata, Syrphidae and Lepidoptera during summer are common. The main lochs attributed to the range are Loch Dungeon, Loch Minnoch and Loch Harrow, all on the east side and in close proximity. Loch Dungeon was known to historically contain Arctic Charr which died out due to acidification; Brown trout populations, however, survived and the water quality has improved. There are currently ten Osprey pairs known to nest in Dumfries and Galloway; these lochs are a known feeding ground. The Lochans of Auchniebut, north of Meikle Millyea and at approximately 650m, may be the highest permanent water bodies in the Southern Uplands.

== Etymology ==
'Rhinns' derives from the Old Irish rind, later Ulster Irish and Scottish Gaelic rinn, meaning 'promontory' or 'point'. 'Kells' is a parish in the historic county of Stewartry of Kirkcudbright to the southeast of the range near New Galloway. Its name possibly derives from the Old Irish cell, later Irish and Scottish Gaelic cill, meaning 'church', but may instead be in reference to its heightened elevation or, historically, wooded land. Most of the hill names are of Scottish Gaelic or Scots origin, such as Meikle Millyea; (Scots: meikle - 'large') (Scottish Gaelic: meall liath - 'grey, round hill'), which translates fully to 'large, grey, round hill'.
