= Carlin's Cairn =

Hill in the Southern Uplands of Scotland

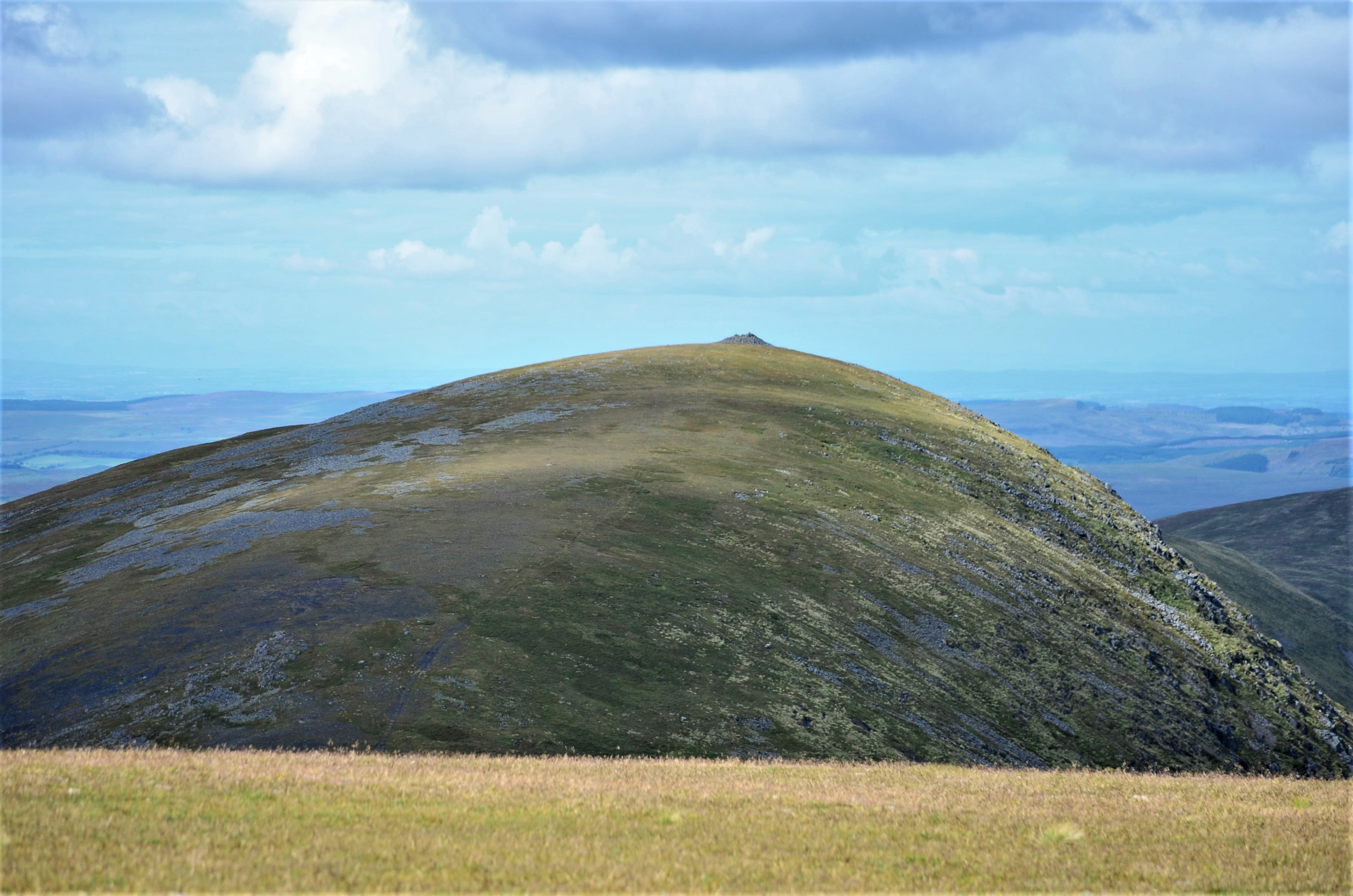

Highest point
- Elevation: 807 m (2,648 ft)
- Prominence: 99 m (325 ft)
- Listing: Tu,Sim,D,sHu,CT,DN

Naming
- Native name: Scottish Gaelic: Càrn na Cailliche
- English translation: Scots, Scottish Gaelic: Old Woman's Hill or The Cailleach's cairn

Geography
- Location: Dumfries and Galloway, Scotland
- Parent range: Rhinns of Kells, Southern Uplands
- OS grid: NX 49698 88362
- Topo map: OS Landranger 77

Carlin's Cairn (Scottish Gaelic: Càrn na Cailliche) is a hill in the Rhinns of Kells, a sub-range of the Galloway Hills range, part of the Southern Uplands of Scotland. It is located immediately north of Corserine, the highest summit of the range. The eighth highest hill in southern Scotland, the commonest ascent is from Forrest Lodge to the east but it is also climbed as part of a traverse along the entire ridge.
