= Milldown =

Hill in the Southern Uplands of Scotland

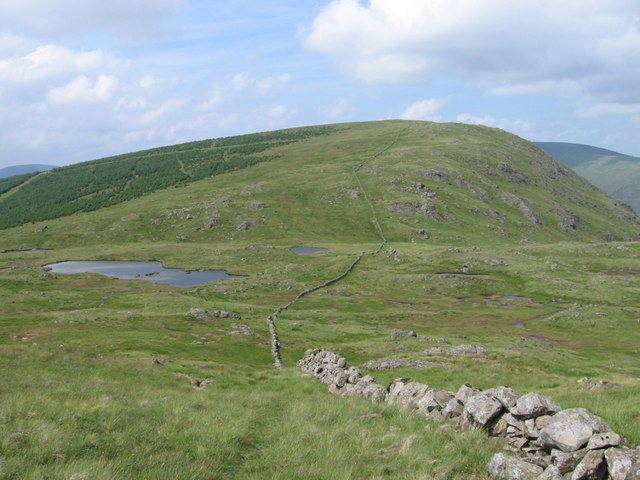

Highest point
- Elevation: 748 m (2,454 ft)
- Prominence: 90 m (300 ft)
- Listing: Tu,Sim,D,sHu,GT,DN

Naming
- English translation: Scottish Gaelic: Brown, Round Hill

Geography
- Location: Dumfries and Galloway, Scotland
- Parent range: Rhinns of Kells, Galloway Hills, Southern Uplands
- OS grid: NX 51128 83949
- Topo map: OS Landranger 77

Milldown is a hill in the Rhinns of Kells, a sub-range of the Galloway Hills range, part of the Southern Uplands of Scotland. It is located immediately north of Meikle Millyea – between these two hills lie the Lochans of Auchniebut, a series of small water bodies at an approximate elevation of 650 m – possibly the highest permanent water bodies in the Southern Uplands. As well as this, the hill is also flanked on its SW side by forest plantation - possibly the highest planted commercial forestry in the Southern Uplands. Like most of its neighbours, it is most easily climbed from the east at Forrest Lodge.

== Subsidiary SMC Summits ==
Summit	Height (m)	Listing
Millfire	716	DT,sSim
