= Larg Hill =

Hill in the Southern Uplands of Scotland

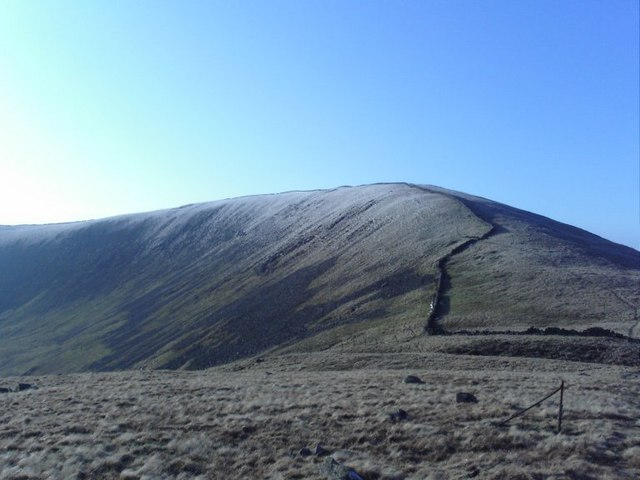

Highest point
- Elevation: 676 m (2,218 ft)
- Prominence: 72 m (236 ft)
- Listing: Tu,Sim,D,GT,DN

Geography
- Location: Dumfries and Galloway, Scotland
- Parent range: Minnigaff Hills, Galloway Hills, Southern Uplands
- OS grid: NX 42474 75745
- Topo map: OS Landranger 77

Larg Hill is a hill in the Minnigaff Hills, a sub-range of the Galloway Hills range, part of the Southern Uplands of Scotland. The second highest and most westerly of the range, it is normally ascended with Lamachan Hill as part of a round normally starting from the north or south. Historically it was covered by woodland consisting of ash, oak, fir and beech.
