= Kirkgate =

Kirkgate is the name of:

- Kirkgate, Leeds, a street in England
- Kirkgate, Leith, a street in Scotland
- Kirkgate (Wakefield), a street in England
- Wakefield Kirkgate railway station, a station in England
