= Millfore =

Hill in Dumfries and Galloway, Scotland

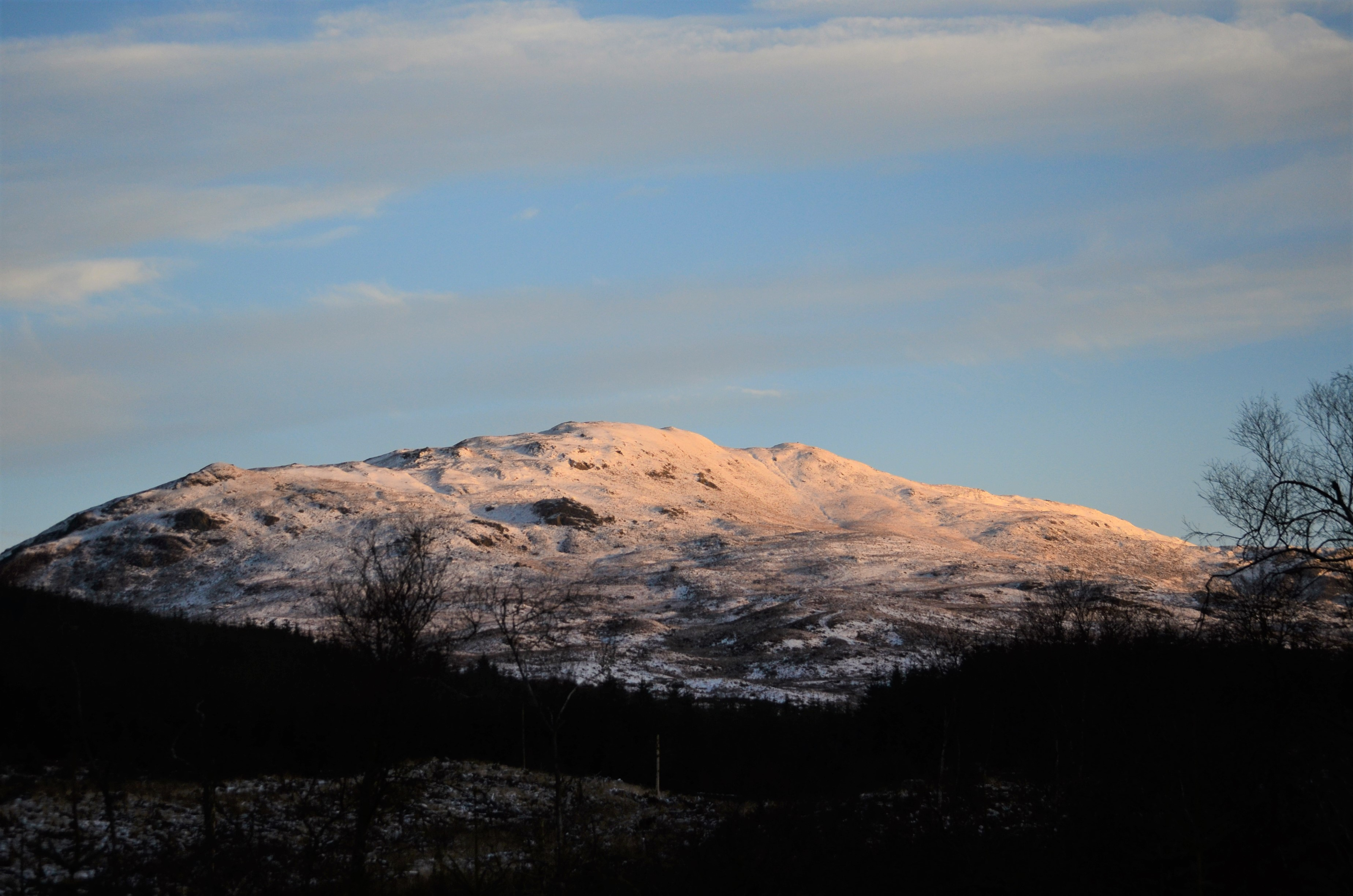

Highest point
- Elevation: 657 m (2,156 ft)
- Prominence: 250 m (820 ft)
- Listing: Ma,Hu,Tu,Sim,G,D,DN,Y
- Coordinates: 55°03′01″N 4°23′01″W

Naming
- English translation: Scottish Gaelic: Cold, Round Hill

Geography
- Location: Dumfries and Galloway, Scotland
- Parent range: Minnigaff Hills, Galloway Hills, Southern Uplands
- OS grid: NX 47812 75455
- Topo map: OS Landranger 77

Millfore is a hill in the Minnigaff Hills, a sub-range of the Galloway Hills range, part of the Southern Uplands of Scotland. It lies northeast of Newton Stewart in Galloway Forest Park, Dumfries and Galloway. One of the less-visited of the Galloway Hills, it nonetheless provides excellent views from its summit over its neighbours and Loch Dee. Isolated from its westerly neighbours by the White Laggan glen, it is frequently climbed on its own from Clatteringshaws Loch to the east.
