= William Merrilees =

- Born: 24 September 1898; Leith, Scotland
- Died: 21 August 1984 (aged 85); Edinburgh, Leith, Scotland
- Other name: Wee Willie
- Police career
- Allegiance: United Kingdom
- Rank: Chief Constable of the Lothians and Peebles Constabulary
- Awards: OBE, QPM

William Merrilees OBE QPM (24 September 1898 – 21 August 1984) was Chief Constable of the Lothians and Peebles Constabulary from 1950 to 1968.

Merrilees is one of Scotland's best known policemen, thanks to a flamboyant career involving disguise, celebrated court cases, and continual charity work. Known as "the pocket-sized detective with a battleship reputation," he was featured in the youth comic book Valiant, and painted twice by Henry Raeburn Dobson. In November 1959 he appeared on This is your Life, hosted by Eamonn Andrews, and in 1966, his memoirs "The Short Arm of the Law" were published by John Long of London.

In 2013, a care home named Merrilees Gate was opened in Juniper Green in honour of Merrilees. The name was selected through a local competition organised with Juniper Green Primary School, with the winning entry submitted by Ceit Mackay. The facility serves as a lasting tribute to Merrilees’s life and contributions to policing in Scotland.

== Early life ==
Willie Merrilees had a strict upbringing. He was born into poverty at around 1898 in Cochrane's Pend in the Kirkgate of Leith. Merrilees started working at a ropeworks when he was 12 years old and lost four fingers of his left hand in a rope winding machine. To help recover from his injuries, the young man learned typing and shorthand, although eventually he began work in a shipyard. In 1919 he married Agnes Buchan, and their son was born the same year.

He lived in Juniper Green. Merrilees became known in his community for rescuing a total of 21 people from drowning, and after receiving an award, he came to the attention of Sir Thomas Hutchison, Bt. the Lord Provost of Edinburgh. Hutchison asked him what he wanted to do with his life; Merrilees replied that he wanted to become a police officer. Hutchison recommended him to the Chief Constable of Edinburgh Roderick Ross.

== Police career ==
Despite Merrilees only being 168 cm (5 ft 6 in) tall, 10 cm (4 in) under police recruitment regulations, and missing fingers on his left hand, the Chief Constable saw his potential and promised to recruit him. He was appointed as a Constable on 9 September 1924.

He soon made an impression and by 1926 was appointed Confidential Enquiry Officer to the Chief Constable. After serving the statutory minimum of 5 years, he was promoted on 1 January 1930 to the rank of Sergeant and placed in charge of the Recruiting and Licensing Department. He was later further promoted to the rank of Inspector on 17 January 1934 and Detective Inspector in 1938. In these role in part he had the responsibility of enforcing laws against homosexuality, as a result of his surveillance both the Kosmo and Maxine's dance clubs were closed down. On 19 March 1940 he was promoted again, becoming second in command of Edinburgh CID (Criminal Investigation Department), with the rank of Detective Lieutenant.

Merrilees was promoted to rank of Detective Superintendent on 6 August 1940 and put in charge of the CID, Licensing Department, Aliens, and Dangerous Drugs and Firearms Departments.

He was awarded the King's Police Medal for distinguished service in June 1944, promoted to Detective Chief Superintendent on 15 January 1947, and on 16 May 1950 he was appointed Chief Constable of the Lothians and Peebles Constabulary. He was awarded the OBE on 1 January 1959.

In September 1963, when he was 65 years old, he was asked by the County Convenor, James G. Methven, to continue in office for another 5 years.

He was given the freedom of the Burgh of Bonnyrigg and Lasswade on 18 June 1965.

=== Notable arrests ===
Merrilees was commended in 1933 for bringing the Kosmo Club brothels to court.

Working undercover as a porter, he arrested German spy Robert Petter (alias Werner Walti) in Waverley railway station in Edinburgh on 30 September 1940. Petter had landed the same day by flying boat with Karl Drucke (alias Francois de Deeker) and Vera von Schalburg (alias Vera Erikson) near the mouth of the Burn of Gollachy, Banffshire (between the villages of Port Gordon and Buckie).
