= Curleywee =

Hill in Dumfries and Galloway, Scotland

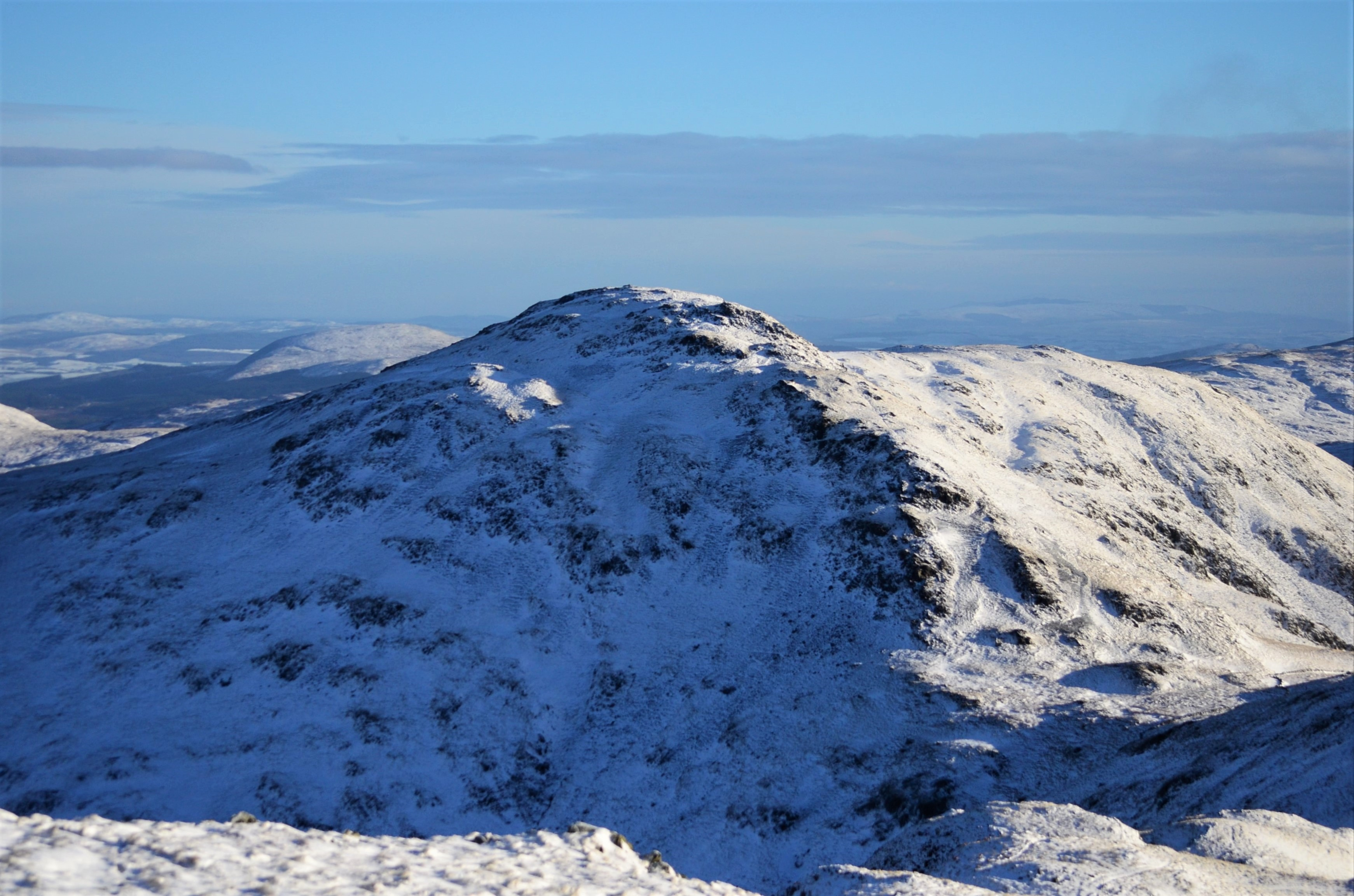

Highest point
- Elevation: 674 m (2,211 ft)
- Prominence: 119 m (390 ft)
- Listing: Hu,Tu,Sim,D,GT,DN,Y

Naming
- English translation: Scottish Gaelic: Hill in the Wind

Geography
- Location: Dumfries and Galloway, Scotland
- Parent range: Minnigaff Hills, Galloway Hills, Southern Uplands
- OS grid: NX 45471 76952
- Topo map: OS Landranger 77

Curleywee is a hill in the Minnigaff Hills, a sub-range of the Galloway Hills range, part of the Southern Uplands of Scotland. It is normally ascended with Lamachan Hill as part of a round normally starting from the north or south.
