= Coran of Portmark =

Hill in the Southern Uplands of Scotland

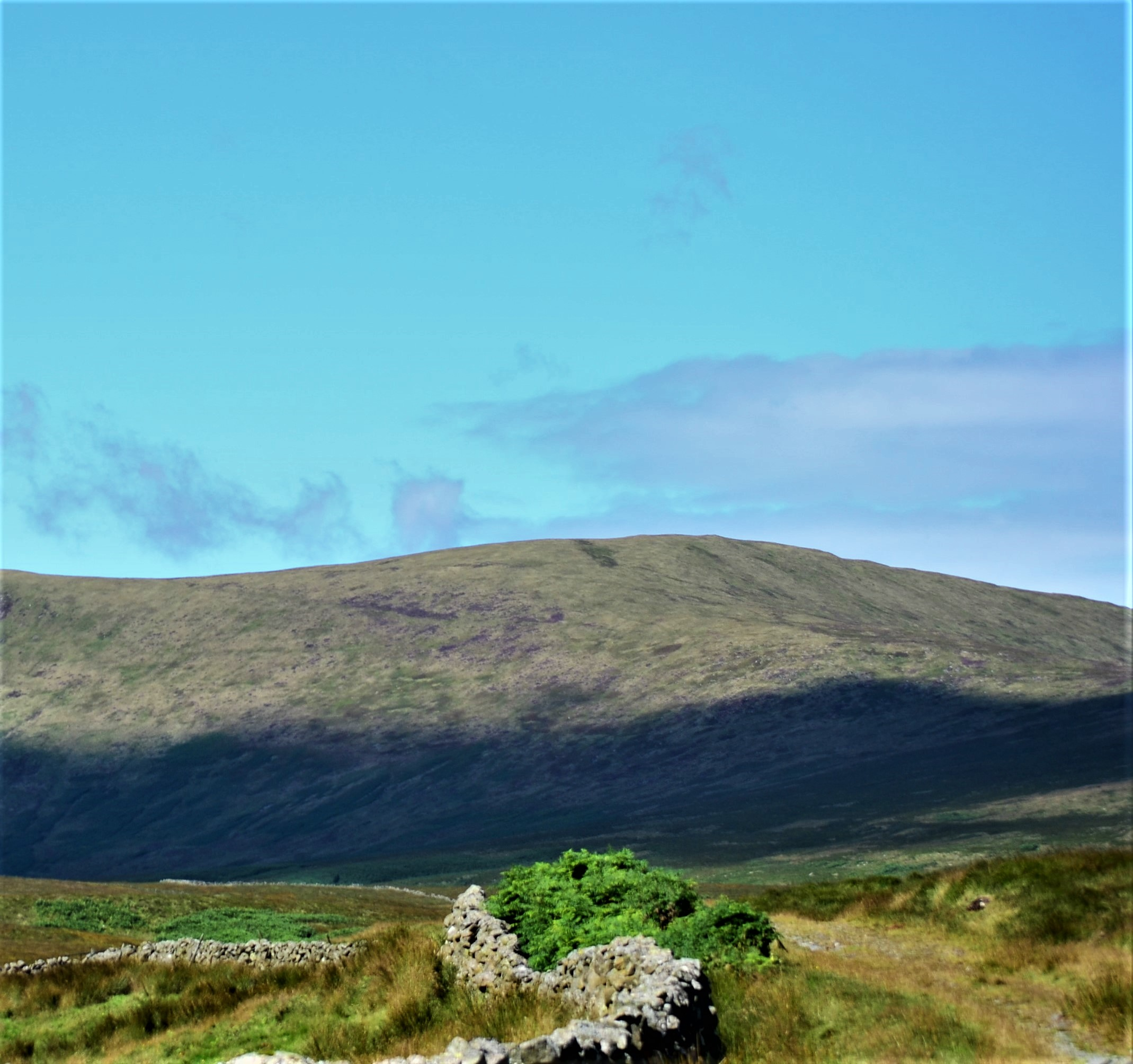

Highest point
- Elevation: 623 m (2,044 ft)
- Prominence: 61 m (200 ft)
- Listing: Tu,Sim,D,GT,DN

Naming
- English translation: Scottish Gaelic: Round Hill (or Hook) of Portmark

Geography
- Location: Dumfries and Galloway, Scotland
- Parent range: Rhinns of Kells, Galloway Hills
- OS grid: NX 50930 93667
- Topo map: OS Landranger 77

Coran of Portmark is a hill in the Rhinns of Kells, a sub-range of the Galloway Hills range, part of the Southern Uplands of Scotland. The most northerly Donald of the range, it is climbed from a number of directions; most commonly from Garryhorn near Carsphairn, often the first hill of a full traverse of the ridge. An old settlement to the west lends its name to the hill.
