= Cowan Dobson =

Scottish portrait artist

David Cowan Dobson R.B.A., (1894–1980) was a leading Scottish portrait artist who first exhibited at Royal Academy when aged only nineteen and began showing at the Royal Scottish Academy four years later. Dobson's works were also exhibited at the Royal Society of Arts, Royal Watercolour Society, Royal Society of Portrait Painters, Royal Society of British Artists, Royal Cambrian Academy, Fine Art Society and at the Walker Art Gallery in Liverpool.

== Family ==
Dobson was born in Bradford, Yorkshire, the second son of the Scottish portrait painter Henry John Dobson (1858–1928) and Jeannie Charlotte Hannah Cowan. Henry John Dobson was from St. John's Town of Dalry in Galloway and had painted, in 1893, the Labour leader James Keir Hardie. David's middle name which he used professionally derives from his mother's maiden name. His grandfather, Thomas Dobson, was a wool merchant in the town of Kirkcudbright. It is said in the family that there was a Dobson wool mill in Dalry, owned and run by Thomas. Henry John did not maintain the family tradition of running the family wool business, and instead became an artist. Family legend has it that Thomas Dobson disowned his son. Henry John's whole life would be marked by financial difficulties.

The oldest child of the Dobson family was Thomas Stanley Dobson, born in 1892 and named after his grandfather. He was known as Stanley Dobson, and became an actor. To make ends meet, Stanley also worked for an art dealer in London. The only sister was Louisa Rankin Dobson (b. 1896), known as Louie. She had an intense family bond with her brothers, but mainly with her younger brother and fourth child, Henry Raeburn Dobson (1901–1985), for whom she cared lifelong. He was named after the eighteenth-century Scottish portrait painter, Sir Henry Raeburn (1756–1823), whom his father admired hugely. Henry Raeburn Dobson became a leading society portrait painter in Edinburgh and Brussels.

== Life and work ==
Although he painted some fine portraits of well known men, like Earl Attlee, Earl Beatty and Harold Wilson, Dobson also portrayed "fashionable London ladies". Dobson was married to Phyllis Bowyer, who was the brains behind his financial success. She made Dobson one of London's leading society portrait painters. She herself sat for the photographer Alexander Bassano, the resulting portrait now being at the National Portrait Gallery, London.

Dobson started his career in Scotland. He was educated at George Watson's College in Edinburgh and studied art in Edinburgh, London and Paris. In 1918 he was using his father's studio at Dalry. Around 1920 he moved to London and from then on he worked and resided mainly in London. Occasionally, he would work in and around Glasgow. He is said to have rented Kenmure Castle, in New Galloway, Kirkcudbrightshire, in the 1930s and 1940s to entertain and paint fashionable sitters. His older brother Thomas Stanley ran the castle as a hotel in the 1950s.

Dobson mainly worked in oils but also painted some fine water-colour scenes. He painted in the tradition of the academic nineteenth century with mostly a rather darker colour scheme, while his brother Henry, influenced by the Modernist movement in Edinburgh, painted more colourful portraits.

During World War I, Dobson was commissioned by the Royal Air Force section of the Imperial War Museum to paint portraits of three recipients of the Victoria Cross. Dobson painted portraits of Lt. Col. L.W. Brabazon Rees, Sgt Mottershead and Flight Lt. A.W. Beauchamps-Proctor.

== Some works ==
- The Farmer (1915) 51 x 61 inches
- Harry Lauder (1915) 62 x 44 inches. (In the possession of the family.)
- Captain John Lauder, Argyll & Sutherland Highlanders (1915) 87 x 50 inches.(Family.)
- Portrait of a young lady (head & shoulders) (1918) 38 x 48 inches
- The New Toy (1918) 59.5 x 74 cm
- Lady Lauder (1921) (wife of Sir Harry Lauder) 50 x 40 inches. (Family.)
- After the Ball (1922) 102 x 76 cm.
- Henry John Dobson (1923), the artist's father. National Gallery of Scotland.
- William Lowrie Sleigh; Lord Provost of Edinburgh (1926) City of Edinburgh Council
- Portrait of a girl with a Rag Doll (1927) 127 x 76 cm
- Portrait of a Huntsman (1930) 61 x 51 inches
- Admiral Lord Beatty in full evening dress (1930) 65 x 52 inches (last sold at Burnt Oak Auctions, Woking, Surrey, 24 September 1988).
- Girl in a Green Turban (1932) 15.4 x 9.3 inches (Sothebys, London, 12 October 1988).
- Roses in a bowl on a circular table (1938) (Hall's Welsh Bridge Salerooms, UK, 16 June 2006)
- Reclining nude 50.8 x 66 inches (Christies, South Kensington, London, 11 March 2004).
- On a sandy beach 50 x 40.2 inches (Sothebys, London, 28 August 1990).
- Moll Flanders (1954) 76 x 63.5 cm/ 30 x 25 inches
- Clement Attlee (1956)
- The Duke of Argyll (Inverary Castle)
- Sir John Black 61 x 51 inches.
- Mrs Cowan Dobson 95 x 74.7 cm
- The Countess of Weir 128 x 101.5 cm.
- Viscount Mackintosh of Halifax 85 x 70 cm. (d.27 Dec 1964)
- Harold Wilson, Prime Minister of the United Kingdom.
