= Minnigaff Hills =

Range of hills in the Southern Uplands of Scotland

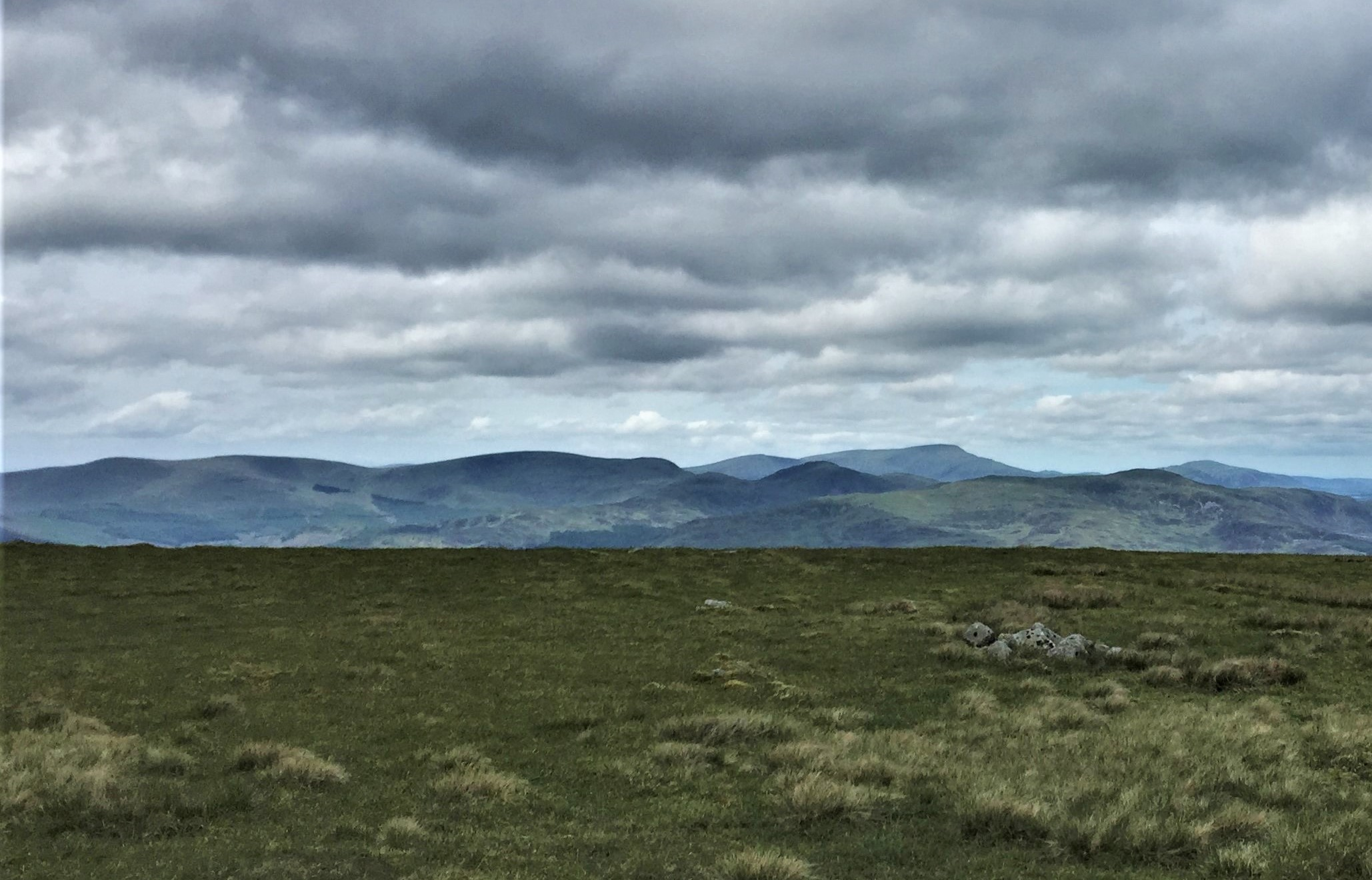
Minnigaff Hills from Cairnsmore of Fleet

The Minnigaff Hills are a range of hills in the Galloway Hills range, part of the Southern Uplands of Scotland. A southerly range, they are perpendicular to the Range of the Awful Hand, Dungeon Hills and Rhinns of Kells to the north. In total, these four ranges are part of the Galloway Forest Park.

== The Hills ==
The hills of the range are the second lowest of the Galloway Hills with the highest hill, Lamachan Hill, reaching 717m, but cover a much more circular area. They are located entirely within Dumfries and Galloway and, despite the name, are most commonly ascended from nearby Glen Trool to the north, albeit more steeply, rather than Minnigaff itself to the south. A common round takes in Lamachan Hill and Curleywee with the option of Larg Hill, however the most easterly and isolated Donald, Millfore, is normally ascended on its own. The higher summits broadly form an 'N' shape and contain far more divergent satellite ridges and individual hills than the other three ranges.

From west to east (excluding all satellite ridges) the hills are:

| Summit | Height (m) | Listing |
|---|---|---|
| Larg Hill | 676 | Tu,Sim, D,GT,DN |
| Lamachan Hill | 717 | Ma,Hu,Tu,Sim, G, D,DN,Y |
| Scars of Milldown | 602.9 | Tu,Sim,DDew |
| Curleywee | 674 | Hu,Tu,Sim, D,GT,DN,Y |
| Bennan Hill | 547 | Tu,5,DDew |
| Gairy of Pulnee | 581 | Tu,5,DDew |
| Millfore | 657 | Ma,Hu,Tu,Sim, G, D,DN,Y |
| Cairngarroch | 557 | Tu,5,DDew |
| Craignell | 477 | Ma,Hu,Tu,4,Y |

== Ecology ==
The SSSI Cairnbaber, lies on the northeast slopes of Millfore and is an example of a SNH priority habitat, Inland Rock Outcrops.

== Etymology ==
A Scottish Gaelic influence is clear on a number of hills in the range; 'Curleywee' is said to come from cor le gaeith (hill in the wind) and 'Millfore' from meall fuar (cold round hill). 'Larg Hill' may derive from Irish: learg (slopes of a hill). An area of land was historically given to the Mackie of Larg by Robert the Bruce; known still as Cumloden, just north of Minnigaff and 5 miles from Larg Hill itself. 'Lamachan Hill', historically 'Lommachan', may derive from Irish: loma (bare).
