= John Johnston (farmer) =

Scottish-American farmer

John Johnston (11 April 1791, Knocknalling, near Dalry, Galloway – 24 November 1880) was a Scottish-American farmer. He is credited with the first public introduction of agricultural drainage in the United States. He did so in 1838.

John Johnston was born in Scotland and emigrated to the United States in 1821. His farmhouse in upper Geneva, New York is now a museum of his life and drainage tiles.
