= Cairnsgarroch =

Hill in the Southern Uplands of Scotland

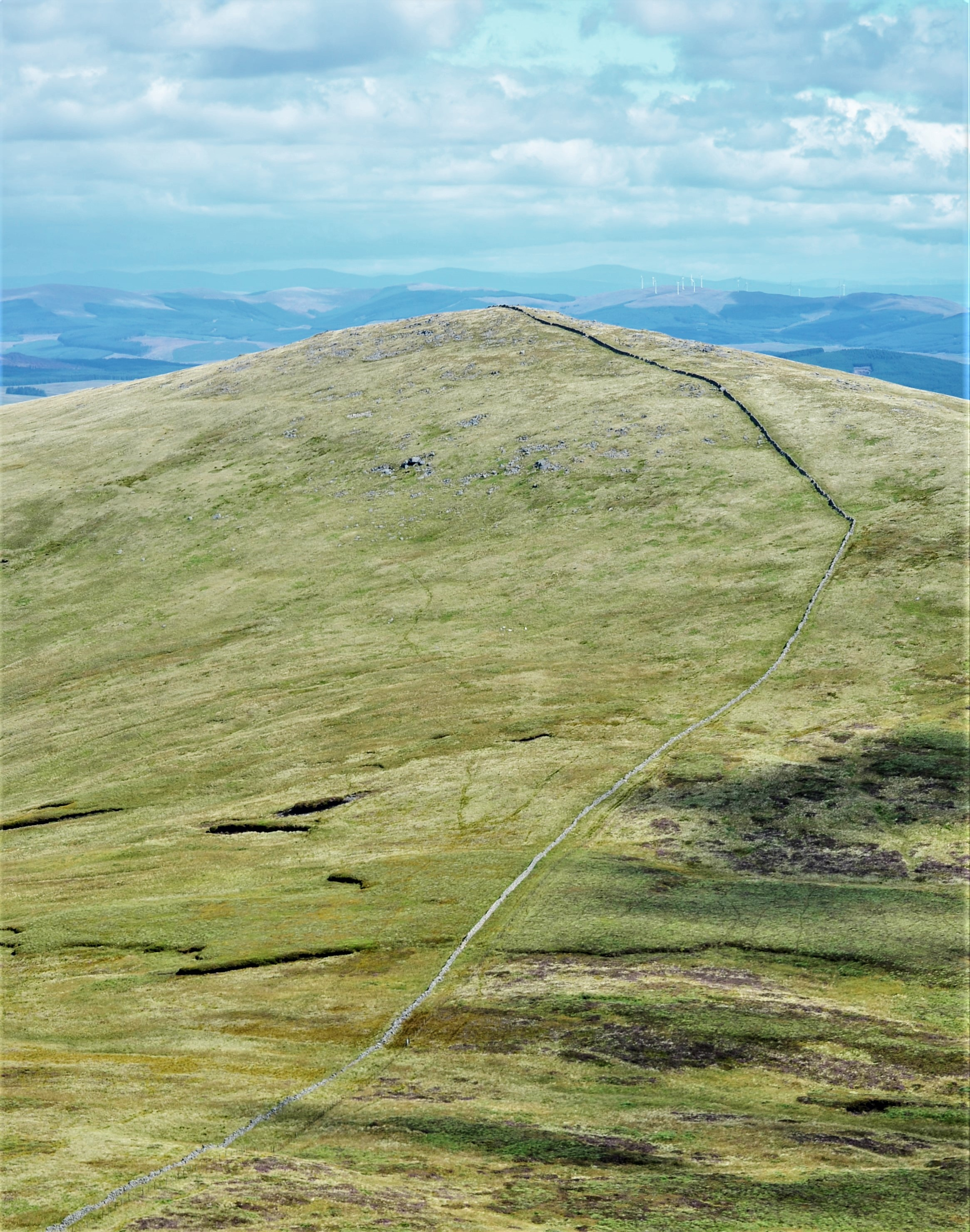

Highest point
- Elevation: 659 m (2,162 ft)
- Prominence: 105 m (344 ft)
- Listing: Hu,Tu,Sim,D,GT,DN,Y

Naming
- Native name: Scottish Gaelic: An Càrnas Gearrach
- English translation: either the furrowed rocky hill or rough and rocky hill

Geography
- Location: Dumfries and Galloway, Scotland
- Parent range: Rhinns of Kells, Galloway Hills, Southern Uplands
- OS grid: NX 51554 91353
- Topo map: OS Landranger 77

Cairnsgarroch (Scottish Gaelic: An Càrnas Gearrach or An Càrnas Gairbheach) is a hill in the Rhinns of Kells, a sub-range of the Galloway Hills range, part of the Southern Uplands of Scotland. Really one of approximately six satellites of the main ridge, it is usually climbed as a detour. Ascents starting from Garryhorn or Forrest Estate near Carsphairn are the most common, often as part of a complete traverse of the ridge.
