= Herbert Archbold Brechin =

Scottish politician

Sir Herbert Archbold Brechin (1903 – 1979) was a Scottish politician who served as Lord Provost of Edinburgh from 1966 to 1969.

== Life ==
He was born in Edinburgh on 3 November 1903, the son of David Brechin (d.1949), a civil servant, and Katharine Mary O’Brien.

He was educated at James Gillespies School in Edinburgh and then attended Heriot-Watt College (now Heriot-Watt University) from 1919 where he trained as a surveyor. In 1931 he founded the company ’’H.A.Brechin & Co’’. In 1934 he married Jane Richmond Cameron.

Brechin successfully campaigned with Sir John Inch to bring the Commonwealth Games to Edinburgh in 1970 which also involved the construction of the Commonwealth Pool and Meadowbank Stadium. In the 1960s he lived at ‘’The Garth’’ 3 Castlelaw Road in the Colinton area of Edinburgh.

In 1969 he was created a Fellow of the Royal Society of Edinburgh. He was created a Knight Commander of the Order of the British Empire by Queen Elizabeth II in 1971 for his services to the city of Edinburgh with particular reference to the Commonwealth Games.

== Positions Held and Honours ==
- Doctor of Letters from Heriot-Watt University 1967.
- Commander of the Order of the British Empire 1968
- Deputy Lieutenant of Edinburgh 1970
- Chairman of Heriot-Watt University Court 1972-79

== Artistic recognition ==
Brechin was painted wearing the ceremonial robes of the Lord Provost by Henry Raeburn Dobson in 1967.
