= St John's Town of Dalry =

Village in Dumfries and Galloway, Scotland

Coordinates: 55°06′22″N 4°09′54″W

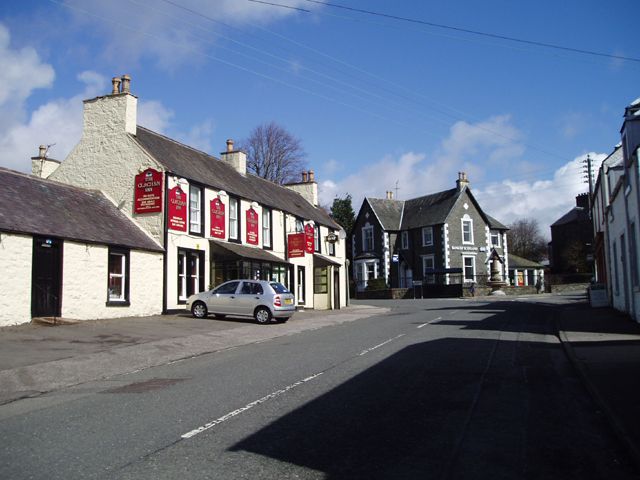
- St John's Town of Dalry

- Location within Dumfries and Galloway
- OS grid reference: NX623812
- Council area: Dumfries and Galloway
- Country: Scotland
- Sovereign state: United Kingdom
- Post town: CASTLE DOUGLAS
- Postcode district: DG7
- Police: Scotland
- Fire: Scottish
- Ambulance: Scottish
- UK Parliament: Dumfries and Galloway
- Scottish Parliament: Galloway and West Dumfries

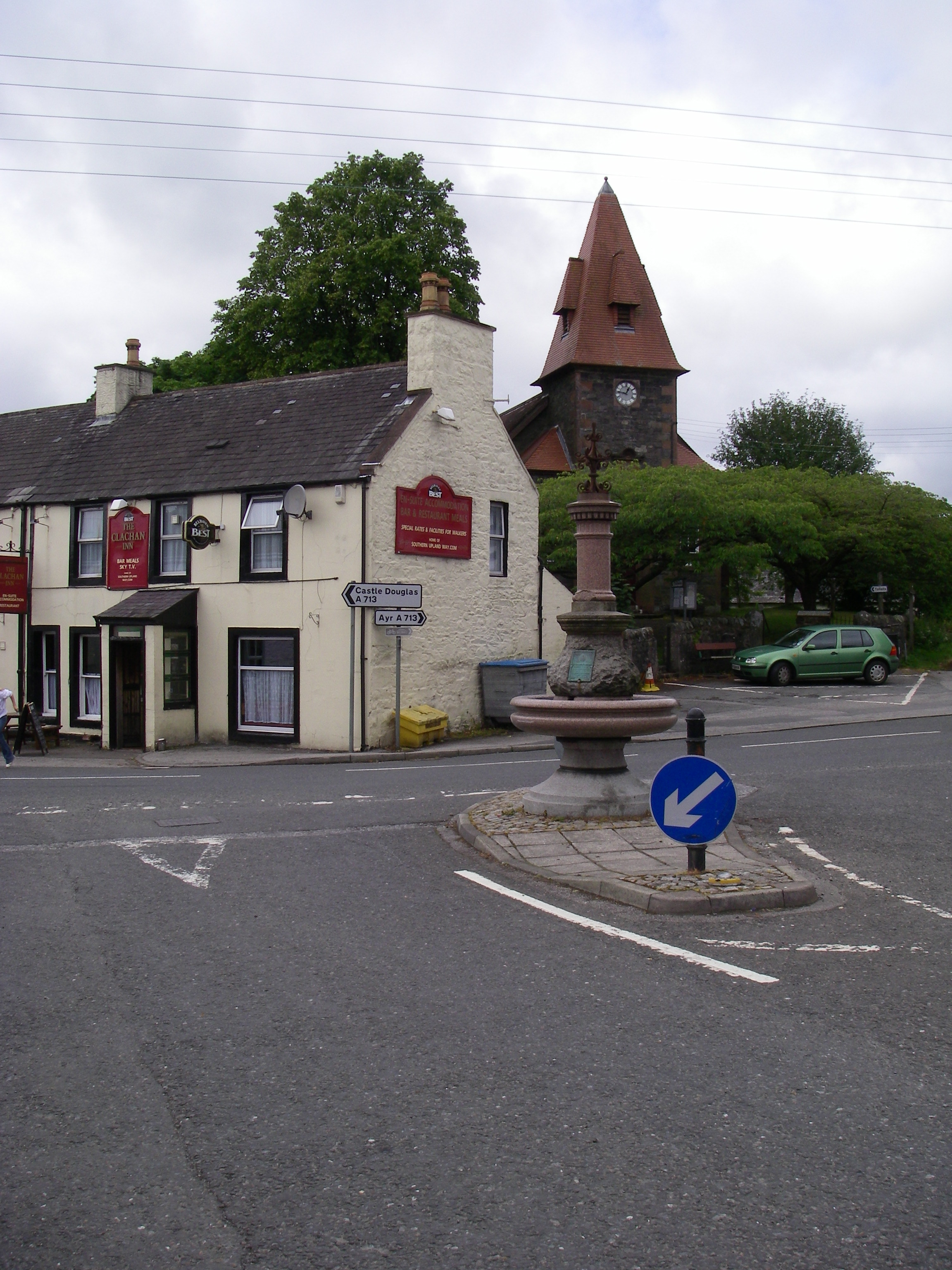
The fountain, Clachan Inn, the town hall and the A702/A713 junction in St John's Town of Dalry

St John's Town of Dalry (Scottish Gaelic: Clachan Eòin), usually referred to simply as Dalry (/dælˈraɪ/ dal-RYE), is a village in Dumfries and Galloway, Scotland, in the historic county of Kirkcudbrightshire.

== Location ==
St Johns Town is located close to the Southern Upland Way, and the nearby Galloway Hills, including the peaks of Corserine and Cairnsmore of Carsphairn. It is also sited on a bend of the Water of Ken, about three miles (five kilometres) from the northern edge of Loch Ken.

The village is 16 miles (26 kilometres) from Castle Douglas along the A713 road, at the southern terminus of the A702 road (to Edinburgh). It's also located on an old pilgrimage route to Whithorn and St Ninian's Cave and named after the Knights of St John.

== History ==
The village was the centre of the 1666 Pentland Rising

The Church of Scotland, Parish Church built in 1831 by William McCandlish is approached via an avenue of lime trees said to have been planted in 1828.

Detached, at side of the Kirk is the Gordon Aisle of 1546, the burial place of the Gordons of Lochinvar.

St Johns Town of Dalry was named Bird Town, to celebrate the work of renowned bird artist and writer Donald Watson who lived in Dalry for many years.

== Facilities ==
Dalry Town Hall, is situated at the heart of the village and is on the famous long-distance footpath known as the Southern Upland Way. The Hall was originally built in 1859, and underwent a full upgrade in 2007. It hosts a range of activities and events including monthly film screenings and the Glenkens Producers Market.

== Notable people ==
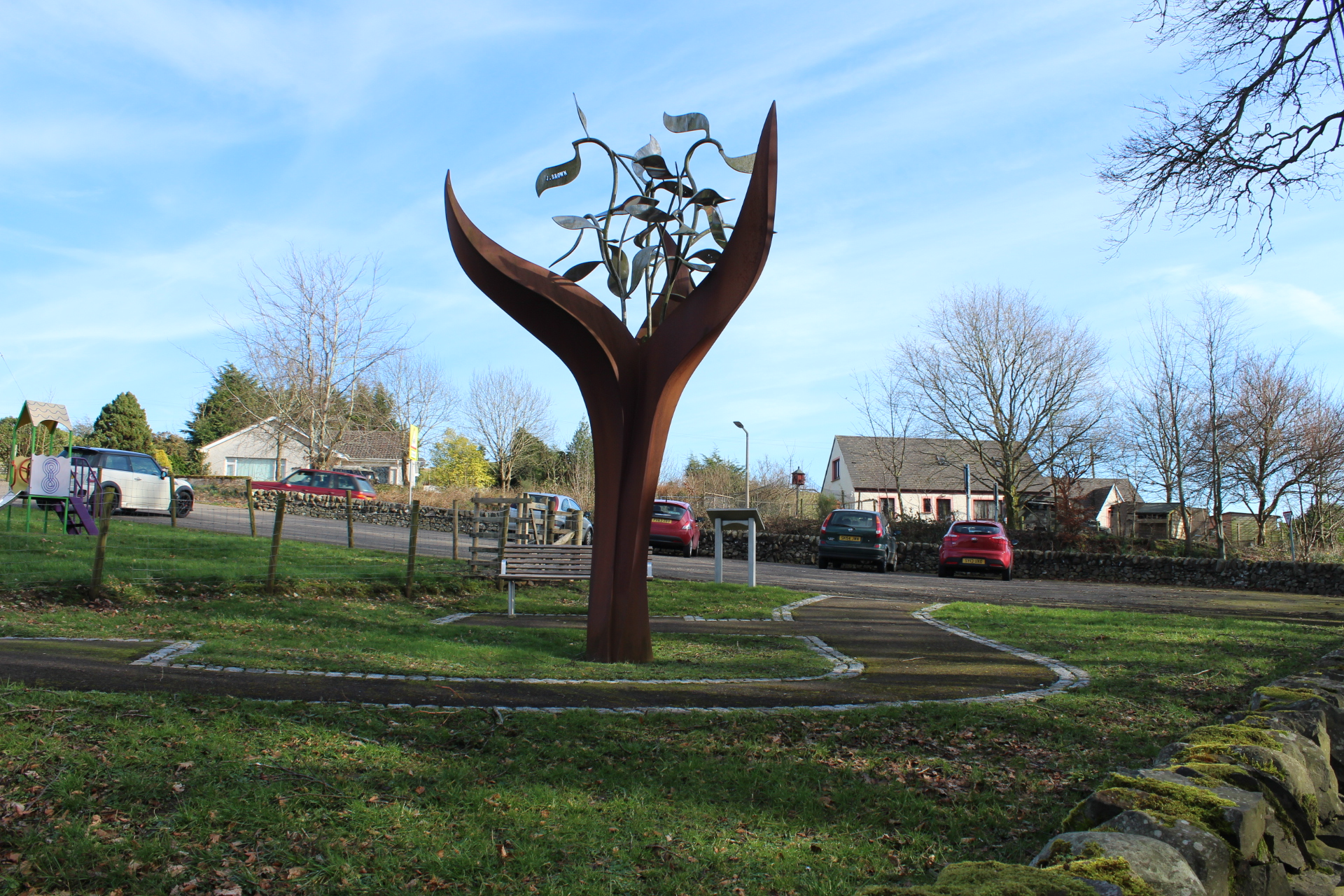
Alexander Gordon's name is on one of the leaves of The Dalry Covenanter Sculpture

- Cedric Thorpe Davie, composer and teacher, being professor of music at St. Andrews University, bought Rose Cottage in 1959 initially for holidays (of which he spent as many as possible here with his family), and retired here in 1977. He died at Rose Cottage on 18 January 1983.
- Colin Douglas (novelist) MBE born 1949, author of a series of novels following the career of a young Edinburgh medical graduate from the late 1960s into the 70s beginning with The Houseman's Tale, which was adapted for BBC television in 1986. Lived in Dalry.
- Henry John Dobson ARCA, RSW (1858–1928) Genre painter. Lived and worked in Dalry. His studio is now the public library. Father of artists David Cowan Dobson and Henry Raeburn Dobson.
- Sir Alex Fergusson (1949–2018), Scottish Conservative Member of the Scottish Parliament and Presiding Officer (2007–2011), lived and farmed near Dalry.
- Hugh Foss 1902–1971, cryptographer and Scottish country dance deviser, worked on the Enigma machines at Bletchley Park during World War II. Lived at Glendarroch in the town from his retirement in 1953 until his death in 1971. Buried in Dalry Kirkyard.
- William Robert Gourlay (1874- 1938) MA, ICS, C.I.E 1917. Indian Civil Service, Private Secretary to Governor of Bengal. Lived in retirement and died at Kenbank, Dalry. The library in Dalry was presented to the town by Mrs Gourlay and named the W.R.Gourlay Memorial Library in honour of her late husband who had been library chairman between 1928 and 1938.
- Neil Gunn 1891–1973, novelist, lived at Kenbank from the age of 12 before moving to London in 1907 to enter the Civil Service.
- John Johnston 1791–1880, a farmer born in nearby Knocknalling, is credited with introducing agricultural drainage to the United States.
- Sir Halliday Macartney, 1833–1906. Military surgeon, diplomat in the Chinese Government. Lived and died at Kenbank in Dalry. Buried at Dundrennan Abbey.
- Barbara Steel OBE; 1857 – 22 December 1943) was a Scottish social activist who actively campaigned for Women's Suffrage in both the United Kingdom and South Africa.
- Dr. Joseph Rhymer BA.; M.Th.; Th.D died 2009, author of 14 books on theology including, The Illustrated Life of Jesus Christ , lived at Grayrigg in the town and is buried in Dalry Kirkyard.
- Prof William Young Sellar FRSE, LLD (1825–1890) Classics Professor University of Edinburgh. Son of Patrick Sellar. Lived and died at Kenbank, Dalry. Buried in Dalry Kirkyard.
- Allan Stewart, artist, (1865–1951) lived and died at Rose Cottage, and is buried at Dalry Kirkyard.
- George Thompson (1928–2016), teacher, MP for Galloway (SNP 1974–1979), Catholic priest Maintained his family home and lived there in his retirement. Buried in Dalry Kirkyard.
- Donald Watson, (1918–2005) was a Scottish ornithologist and a wildlife artist and writer, lived here for over 50 years. He is buried in Dalry Kirkyard.

== Climate ==
In common with the rest of the country, Dalry benefits from a climate classified as Oceanic (Köppen Cfb), encompassing cool summers and mild winters with year-round rainfall. Temperature extremes at Glenlee, under 1 mile (1.5 kilometres) southwest, have ranged from 31.0 °C (87.8 °F) during July 2005 to −18.3 °C (−0.9 °F) in both January 1940 and December 1995.

Climate data for Glenlee (1991–2020 averages)
Month	Jan	Feb	Mar	Apr	May	Jun	Jul	Aug	Sep	Oct	Nov	Dec	Year
Mean daily maximum °C (°F)	6.9 (44.4)	7.6 (45.7)	9.5 (49.1)	12.6 (54.7)	16.1 (61.0)	18.3 (64.9)	19.8 (67.6)	19.1 (66.4)	16.7 (62.1)	13.0 (55.4)	9.5 (49.1)	7.2 (45.0)	13.0 (55.4)
Mean daily minimum °C (°F)	0.7 (33.3)	0.6 (33.1)	1.6 (34.9)	3.0 (37.4)	5.6 (42.1)	8.6 (47.5)	10.5 (50.9)	10.0 (50.0)	7.9 (46.2)	5.0 (41.0)	2.5 (36.5)	0.5 (32.9)	4.7 (40.5)
Average precipitation mm (inches)	211.7 (8.33)	162.6 (6.40)	137.3 (5.41)	99.1 (3.90)	90.2 (3.55)	96.0 (3.78)	101.7 (4.00)	128.3 (5.05)	127.2 (5.01)	195.9 (7.71)	206.6 (8.13)	224.2 (8.83)	1,780.6 (70.10)
Average precipitation days	18.6	15.4	14.9	13.2	12.4	12.8	14.1	15.7	14.4	18.2	18.3	18.5	186.4
Mean monthly sunshine hours	31.4	59.6	97.9	140.8	180.8	149.6	158.2	142.1	110.5	74.0	44.5	26.0	1,215.1
Source: Met Office
