= Corserine =

Hill in the Southern Uplands of Scotland

Coordinates: 55.15472°N 4.35889°W

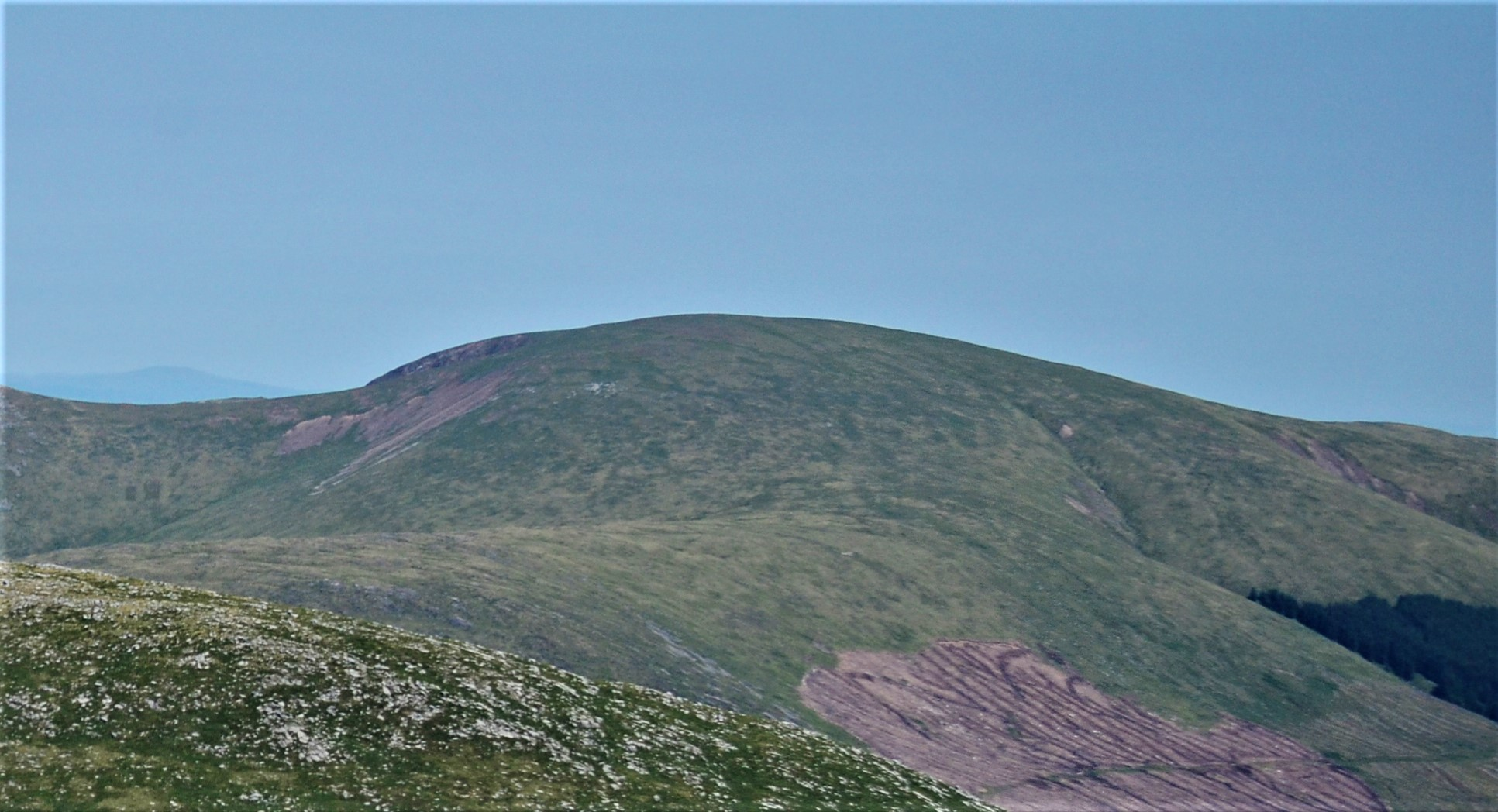

Highest point
- Elevation: 814 m (2,671 ft)
- Prominence: 488 m (1,601 ft)
- Listing: Ma,Hu,Tu,Sim, C, D,DN,Y

Naming
- Native name: Scottish Gaelic: A' Chroisrinn
- English translation: Cross of the Promontory (i.e. of the Rhinns of Kells)

Geography
- Location: Dumfries and Galloway, Scotland
- Parent range: Rhinns of Kells, Galloway Hills, Southern Uplands
- OS grid: NX 49784 87065
- Topo map: OS Landranger 77

Corserine (Scottish Gaelic: A' Chroisrinn) is a hill in north of the Rhinns of Kells, a sub-range of the Galloway Hills range, part of the Southern Uplands of Scotland. It is the highest point of the range and the second highest point in Galloway. The peak ridge goes east-west despite the Rhinns of Kells overall going north-south, so it was seen as lying 'across the Rhinns', which gave the hill its name in Gaelic. The usual route of ascent is from the car park at Forrest Lodge to the east of the hill via Loch Harrow and North Gairy Top. Forest Lodge is a short drive from the village of St. John's Town of Dalry.

== Climbing ==
Because of the nature of the rock no good rock climbing has been recorded on Corserine or elsewhere on the Rhinns. However, in winter after a good freeze there are a number of good ice climbs of up to 150 m on the slopes of Milldown just south of Corserine.
