= Kirkgate, Leith =

Street in Leith, Edinburgh, Scotland

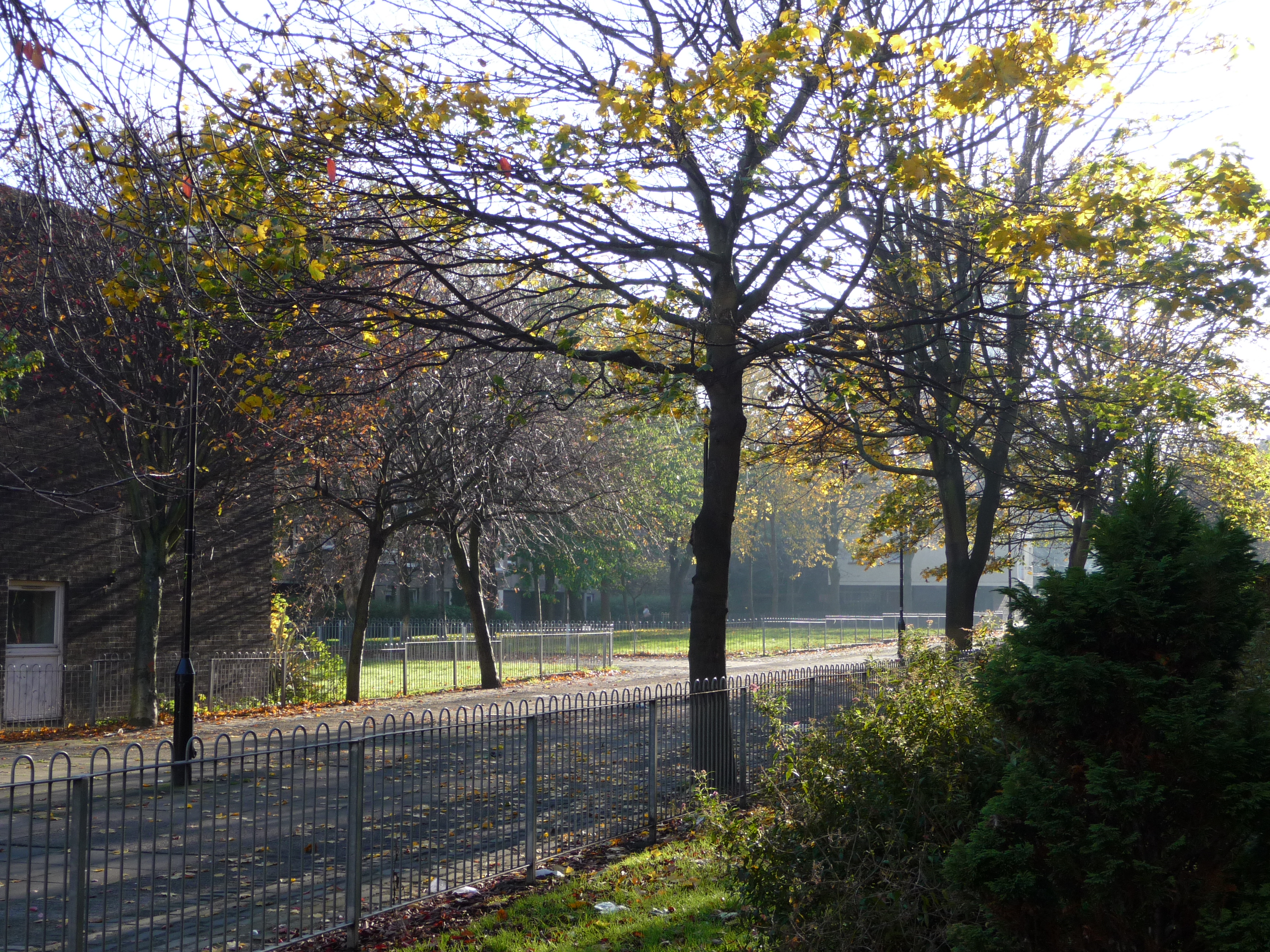
Kirkgate, Leith

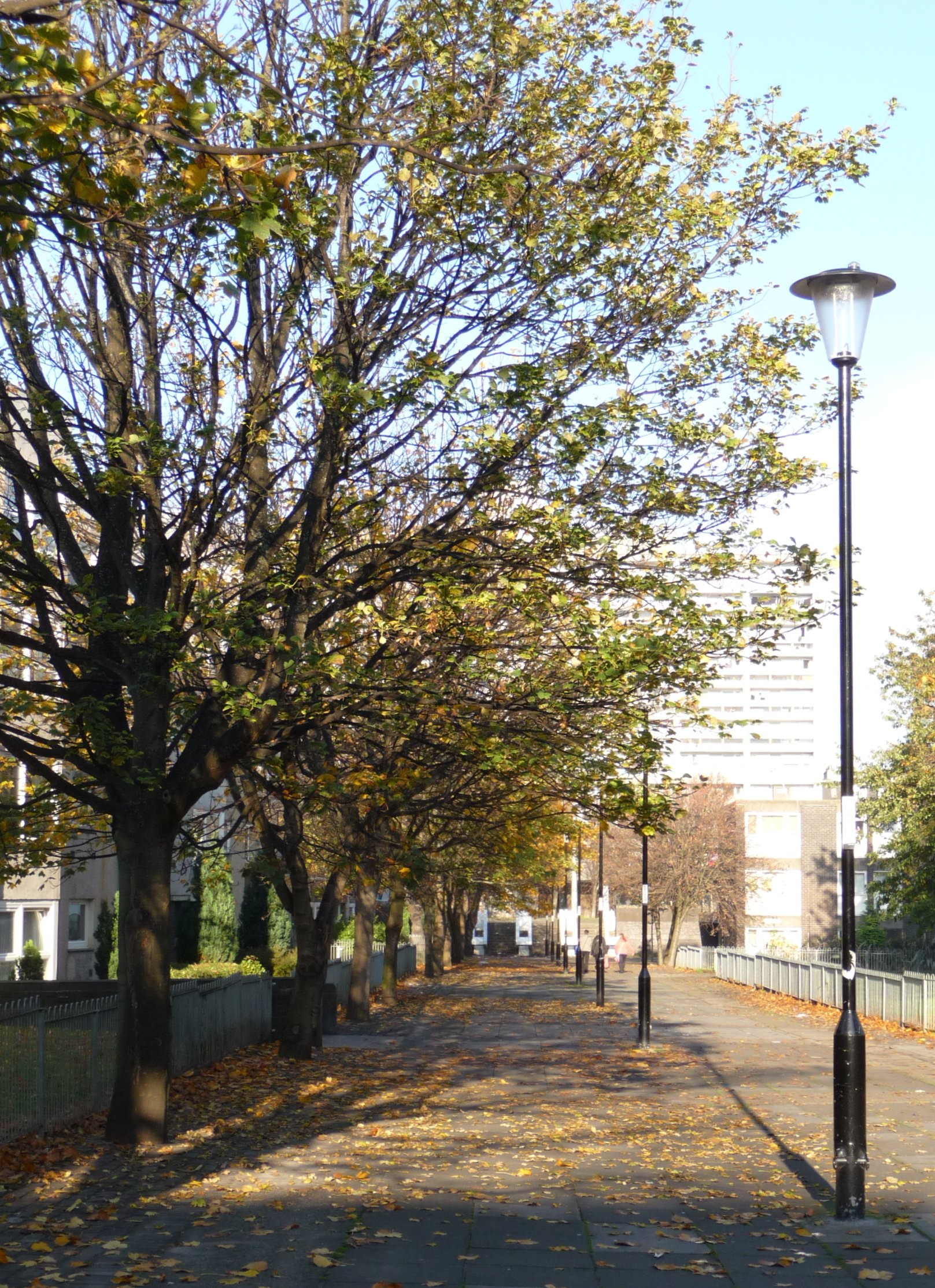
Kirkgate, Leith

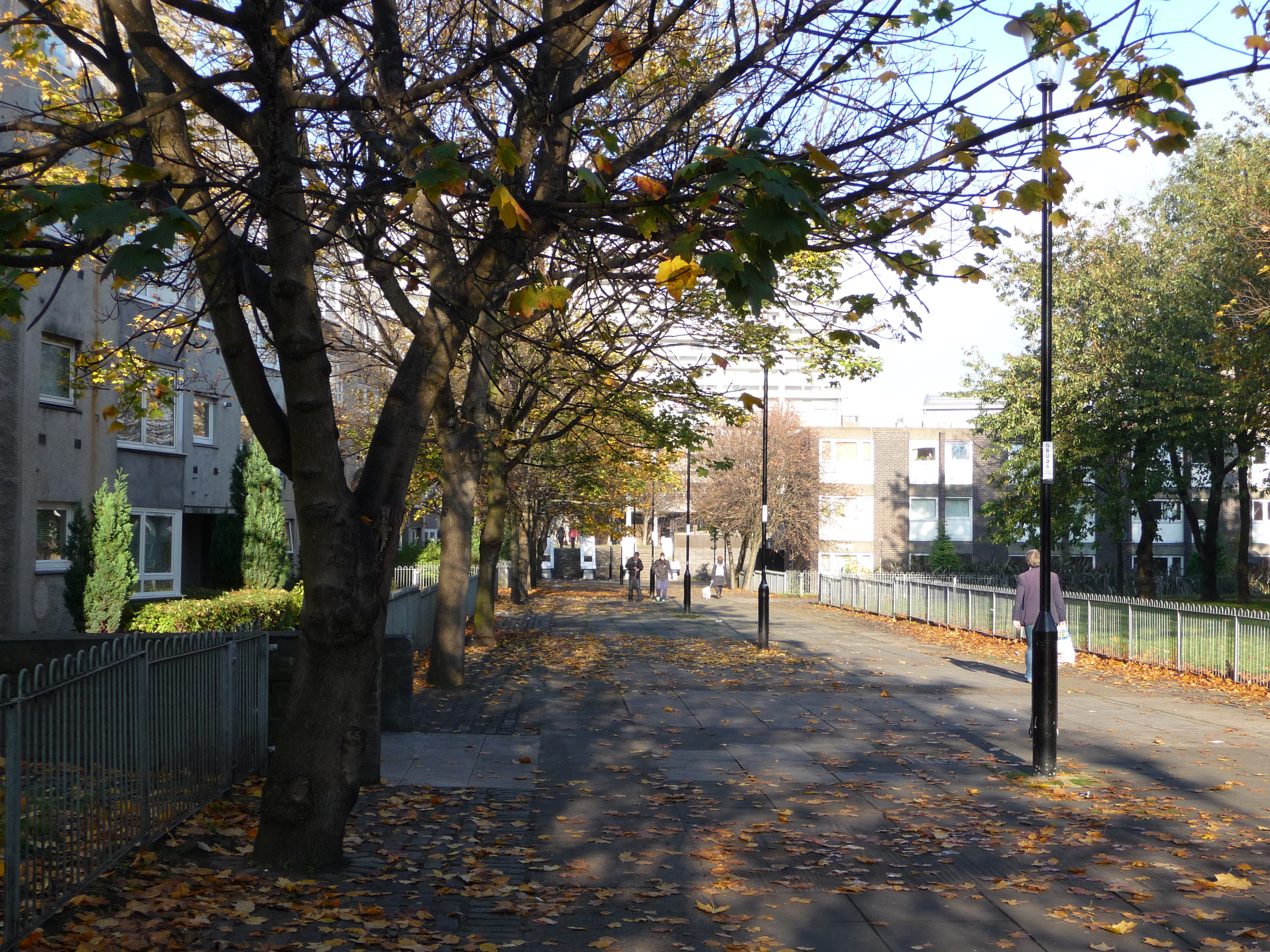
Kirkgate, Leith

Kirkgate is an ancient thoroughfare in Leith, Edinburgh, Scotland. It runs north from the foot of Leith Walk towards Leith Docks. It is one of the oldest streets in the district and historically one of its most vital road links.

Most of the buildings on old Kirkgate and neighbouring streets such as Tolbooth Wynd were demolished in the 1960s and replaced by the Newkirkgate Shopping Centre and a new housing complex, which incorporates the A-listed tower block Linksview House, in 1965. The resident population were mainly dispersed to new housing developments elsewhere in Edinburgh.

== Etymology ==
The street name is of Old Norse origin, and is identical in meaning with "Church Street". The church it refers to is probably South Leith Parish Church.

== Notable buildings and landmarks ==
- Gaiety Theatre, Leith
- Trinity House of Leith
- Leith Hospital
- South Leith Parish Church
- Linksview House

== Notable residents ==
- Lord Balmerino
- Robert Andrew Macfie, businessman and Member of Parliament
- William Merrilees, policeman

== Bibliography ==
- Grant, James A. Cassell's Old and New Edinburgh: Its History, its people and its places. Vol. VI. London: Cassell & Company.
