= Lamachan Hill =

Hill in the Minnigaff Hills, Scotland

Coordinates: 55.06184°N 4.45201°W

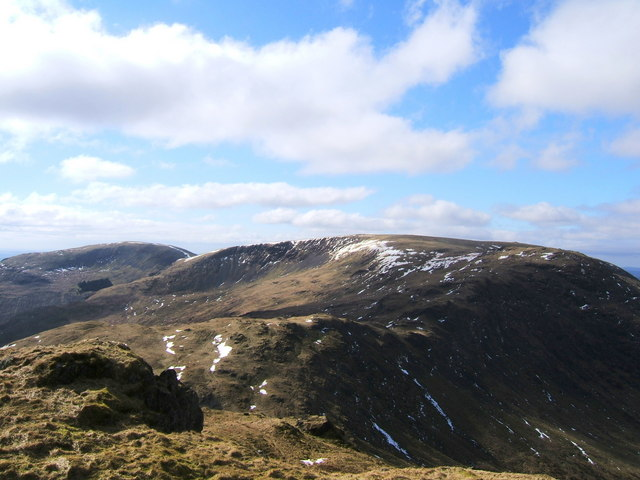
- Lamachan Hill viewed from the summit of Curleywee

Highest point
- Elevation: 717 m (2,352 ft)
- Prominence: 453 m (1,486 ft)
- Listing: Ma,Hu,Tu,Sim, G, D,DN,Y

Geography
- Location: Dumfries and Galloway, Scotland
- Parent range: Galloway Hills
- OS grid: NX 43536 76996
- Topo map: OS Landranger 77

Lamachan Hill is a hill in the Minnigaff Hills, a sub-range of the Galloway Hills range, part of the Southern Uplands of Scotland. It is the highest hill of the range, lying 11 kilometres (7 mi) north of Newton Stewart in Dumfries and Galloway.
