= Henry John Dobson =

Scottish artist

Henry John Dobson ARCA RSW (1858–1928) was a 19th/20th century Scottish artist. He is best remembered for his 1893 portrait of Keir Hardie.

== Life ==
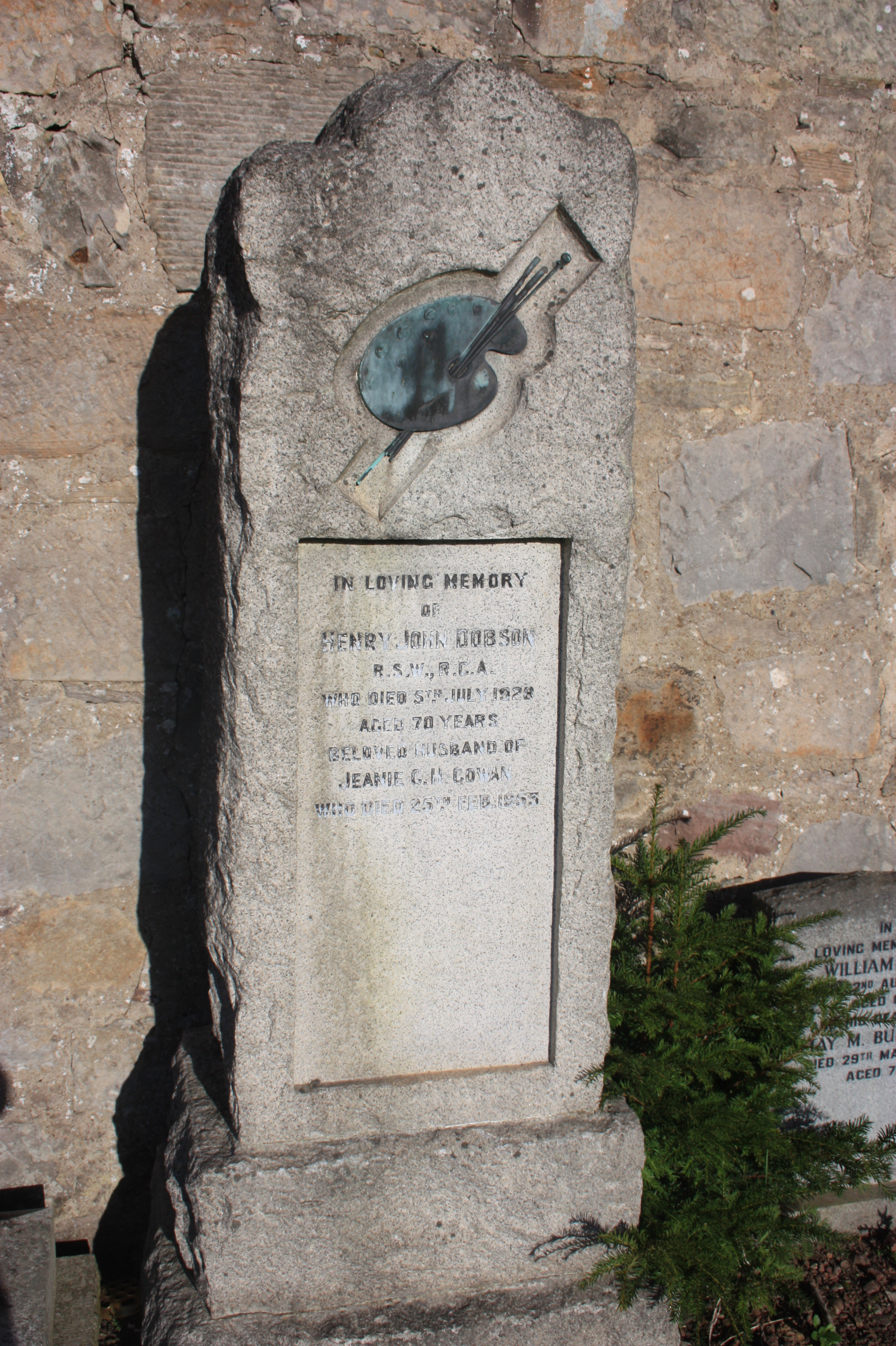
The grave of Henry John Dobson, Liberton Cemetery, Edinburgh

He was born in St John's Town of Dalry in 1858, the son of Rebecca and Thomas Dobson, a wool merchant. He maintained a studio in St John's Town of Dalry which still exists and is now the public library.

He trained at the Trustees Academy School of Design in Edinburgh and also studied at the Royal Scottish Academy.

In the 1890s he was living in Bradford.

In 1911 he had studios at 108 George Street in Edinburgh's First New Town and lived at 12 Leven Terrace in the Bruntsfield district.

He died on 5 July 1928 and is buried in Liberton Cemetery. The grave lies against the east wall of the north cemetery, midway along its length.

== Known works ==
- Old Lady Spinning - Stranraer Museum
- The Light of Home - Stewartry Museum
- The Crofter's Grace (1894)
- George Hamilton (1855–1835) - Glasgow Museums Resource Centre
- Mrs Hamilton (1899)
- Keir Hardie - Scottish National Portrait Gallery
- Keir Hardie in 1892 - Parliamentary Art Collection
- Granny's Blessing - Bradford Industrial Museum
- Mending the Bird's Cage (1907)
- Dr Livingstone Teaching the Natives
- Burns' Grace
- The Rt Hon Edward Herbert, 3rd Earl of Powis
- A Scottish Sacrament
- Cottage Interior with a Young Girl
- Burns' Wooing
- Busy Guidwife
- Mother Hen
- The Evening Chapter
- John Anderson My Jo
- Fireside Crack
- Granddad's Favourite
- The Evening Lesson
- Peeling Tatties

== Artistic recognition ==
His full length portrait by his son, Cowan Dobson (1898–1980), is held by the Scottish National Portrait Gallery.

== Family ==
He was married to Jeanie Charlotte Hannah Cowan (died 1953).

They had four children, two of which became successful painters, Henry Raeburn Dobson (in obvious homage to the artist Henry Raeburn) and David Cowan Dobson.
