= Meikle Millyea =

Hill in the Rhinns of Kells, Scotland

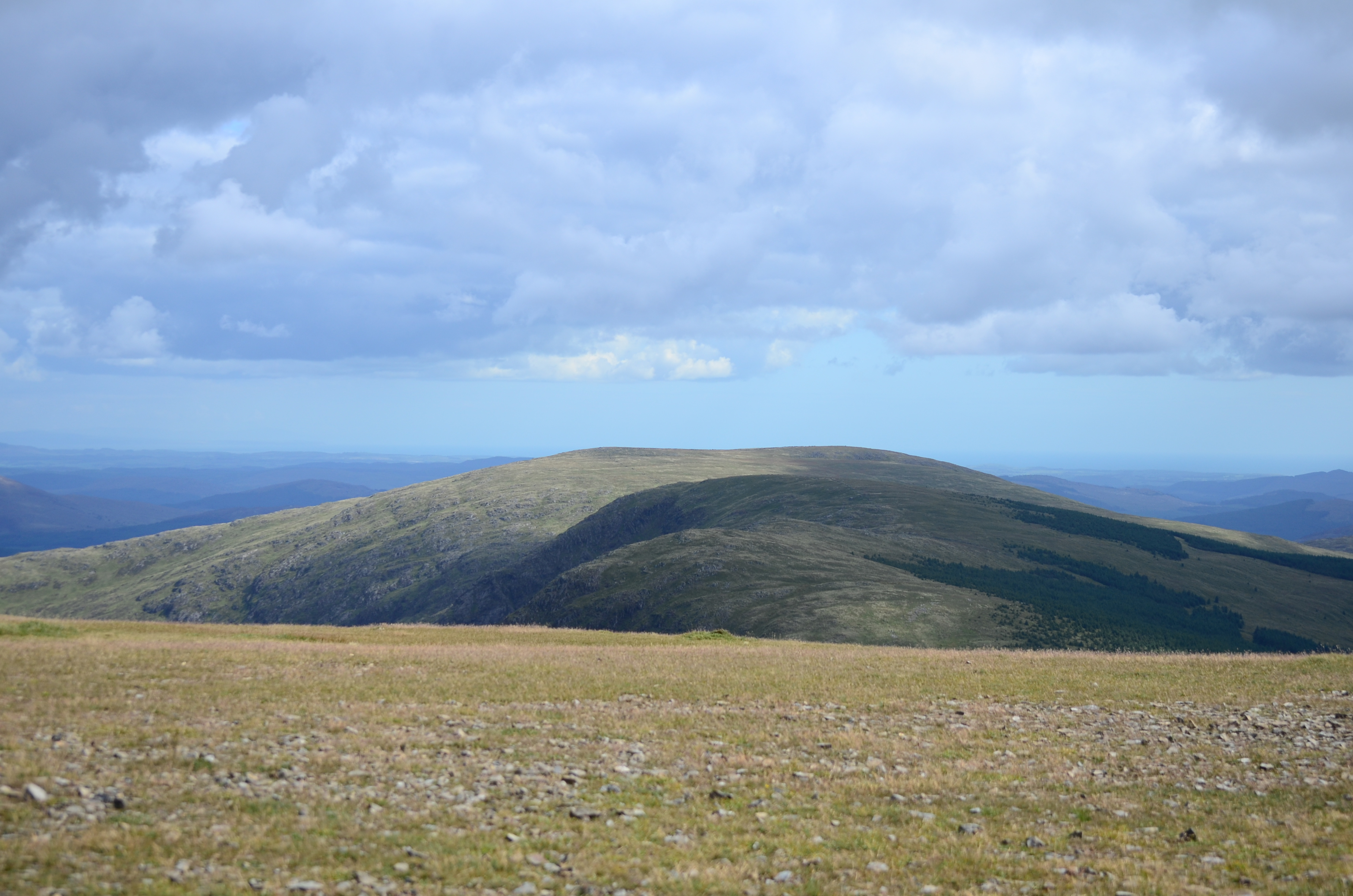

Highest point
- Elevation: 748.6 m (2,456 ft)
- Prominence: 121 m (397 ft)
- Listing: Hu,Tu,Sim,D,GT,DN,Y

Naming
- Native name: Scottish Gaelic: Meall Liath Mòr
- English translation: Scots, Scottish Gaelic: Large Grey Round Hill

Geography
- Location: Dumfries and Galloway, Scotland
- Parent range: Rhinns of Kells, Southern Uplands
- OS grid: NX 51616 82555
- Topo map: OS Landranger 77

Meikle Millyea (Scottish Gaelic: Meall Liath Mòr) is a hill in the Rhinns of Kells, a sub-range of the Galloway Hills range, part of the Southern Uplands of Scotland. The true summit of the hill has been disputed over the years; a 2015 survey concluded that the southwest top, around 400 m southwest from the trig point and cairn is approximately 2 m higher.
