= Henry Raeburn Dobson =

Scottish painter (1901–1985)

Henry Raeburn Dobson (29 May 1901 – 22 May 1985) also known by his middle name Raeburn Dobson, was a Scottish portrait and landscape painter from Edinburgh. He was active in Edinburgh and Brussels from 1918 until 1980. His father, Henry John Dobson (1858–1928), and his brother, Cowan Dobson (1894–1980), were genre and portrait painters. His portraits are mainly painted in oil, whereas his landscapes are mostly watercolours.

== Family History ==
Henry Raeburn Dobson, a high society portrait painter, was born into a middle-class family with its roots in Kirkcudbright, Scotland. His father, Henry John Dobson (1858–1928), was a Scottish genre and portrait painter from Dalry. Henry Dobson's grandfather, Thomas Dobson, was a wool merchant in the town of Kirkcudbright. The family believes there was a Dobson wool mill in Dalry, and it is thought this mill may have been owned and operated by Thomas Dobson. Henry Dobson did not continue the family tradition of running the family wool business. To become a painter he sacrificed his inheritance, and family legend states that Thomas Dobson disowned his son. Henry Dobson's life was marked by financial difficulties.

Henry Dobson married Jeannie Charlotte Hannah Cowan on 17 September 1890, in Dalry, in the district of Kirkcudbright. To exercise his art (and because there were more opportunities for painting portraits in the Scottish capital) they moved to a house in Edinburgh. Henry Raeburn Dobson was born there at 9 Merchiston Crescent in a house that is stated to have had at least "7 rooms with one or more windows".

As a portrait painter, Henry Dobson did not have much success. He transitioned into Scottish genre paintings in the style of Thomas Faed (1826–1900), Henry Wright Kerr (1857–1936) and David Wilkie (1785–1841). These scenes were especially popular in the United States and Canada, where they were often printed on tin biscuit boxes. Because Henry John often had difficulties paying the rent, the family moved often. It is said that he actually lived from hand to mouth and that it was mainly due to the household skills of his wife Jeannie that the family survived.

== Siblings ==
Raeburn was the youngest of Henry John Dobson's four children. The oldest child was Thomas Stanley Dobson, born in 1892 and named after his grandfather. He became an actor, but also worked for an art dealer named Robertson in London.

David Cowan Dobson was born in 1894 and was known as Cowan Dobson, a well-known London Society portrait painter. Although he painted portraits of famous men, including Earl Attlee, Earl Beatty and Harold Wilson, he mainly portrayed "fashionable London ladies". The name Cowan was given to David after his mother's family name.

The only sister was Louisa Rankin Dobson. She was born in 1896. She had an intense family bond with her younger brother and – together with mother Jeannie – looked after him throughout his life.

Raeburn was given the name of Henry Raeburn, after the famous eighteenth-century Scottish portrait painter, Sir Henry Raeburn (1756–1823), whom his father admired hugely.

== School years ==
Despite Henry John Dobson's financial precariousness, he sent his children to good local schools. Little is known about Raeburn's school days. His first years of formal education were spent at James Gillespie's High School in Edinburgh. He and Louisa were enrolled together on 5 September 1906. The family then lived at 4 Glengyle Terrace, Edinburgh.

Raeburn left Gillespie's on 18 July 1911, to attend the prestigious George Watson's College, also in Edinburgh. The family attached much importance to good education. At that time, the school was based near Lauriston Place in the centre of Edinburgh. In 1932, George Watson's College moved to its present building in Colinton Road, outside the city centre. He was admitted to George Watson's College on 26 September 1911. He left the school in July 1917, to attend (according to the school's archives) Art College.

In his last year at the college (his fifth), he studied English, History, Mathematics, Latin and French. His best subjects were the latter two. At the time, drawing was only taught to boys up to the fourth year. His art teacher at Watson's was Ralph W. Hay In art teaching, he was a pioneer of the Modern Movement in Scotland. He was one of the first to break away from the traditional colourless nineteenth-century way of teaching drawing. He was all in favour of colour, decoration and the expression of fantasy. This may explain why Raeburn's portraits – unlike his brother's portraits – are more colourful.

There is one odd circumstance which has been noted in his records. Henry left the school without warning in July 1912 to attend Mr. A. Miller Inglis' School for Boys, Maidenhead College, Maidenhead, Berkshire. Mr. Inglis was a cousin of his father. The note states "…but probably not to be there long as mother is missing him being at home." He did indeed return quickly to Edinburgh and returned to George Watson's College, but this time he stayed at a private boarding house run by Mrs. Imrie, who catered for George Watson's College pupils.

His art education started by being taught drawing and painting by his father. In 1917, after his years at George Watson's, he attended the Edinburgh College of Art, but only for one year According to his R.A.F. file, he attended the Royal College of Art in London the following year, where he studied until 1924. However, this cannot be proven, because the Royal College of Art in London does not have any records of Raeburn. In 1921, he was elected "Associate Member" of the Royal Cambrian Academy, of which he became a full member in 1930.

== London years ==
Raeburn left Edinburgh sometime between 1928 and 1929 and went to live and work in London, only to return to Scotland after the War. Several references state the following addresses for Raeburn :

- (1927-8) 130 George Street, Edinburgh
- (1929) Studio 108, Earl's Court Road, London, W8
- (1931) 5 Thurloe Square, SW7
- (1939) 20, Cranley Place, London SW7
- (1940) 82, Studland Rd, Hanwell, London, W732
- (1941) c/o Mathieson, 20 Frederick St., Edinburgh
- (1941–1947) 12, Shandwick Place, Edinburgh 2
- (1945) f/o, R.A.F., c/o C. Robertson & Co., 71 Parkway, London, N.W. 1
- (1950–1963) The Scottish Liberal Club, Edinburgh
- (1965) Mavisbush Lodge, Polton, Lasswade, Midlothian

These addresses are a mixture of residences, post boxes and studio addresses. In 1947, Raeburn had already returned to Edinburgh and lived in Queen Street, before moving to Fettes Row, on the outskirts of the Georgian New Town of the Scottish capital. The address at the Scottish Liberal Club was probably a post box. But, he exhibited there and he may also have had some rooms there.

Mavisbush Lodge was his workshop. At that time (1965) he lived in a flat at 5, Fettes Row, Edinburgh.

In the early 1920s, his elder brother Cowan Dobson, an official war artist, had already settled in the British capital. He was well established in London, and in his home town of Glasgow. His wife, Phyllis Bowyer, was a driving force behind his success. Cowan and Phyllis travelled constantly between Glasgow and London.

Raeburn, unlike his elder brother, was never as commercially successful as Cowan: neither in London, nor in Edinburgh, nor in Brussels. Raeburn himself seemed not to have been interested in making money.

In London, Raeburn lived in Thurloe Square and Cranley Place, in the Royal Borough of Kensington and Chelsea, which were prestigious addresses, as was Earls Court Road. He wanted to create an image for his customers and properly for himself: the image of a well-to-do society painter. Such image was very much acceptable for his customers.

In this pre-war period Raeburn painted the portrait of Gordon Highlander Col. Osbaldeston-Mitford, which was destroyed in a bomb attack in 1940, and – in 1928 – one of the few life-size portraits he ever made, the portrait of the Maharaja of Jodhpur (India), Umaid Singh.

On 19 January 1939, Raeburn married the 13-years-younger Isabella Rae Smith Dawson. She was born in Falkirk, near Stirling, Scotland, on 23 September 1913. The couple never lived together. After the wedding, Raeburn remained at Cranley Place, where he lived with his mother. Isabella remained at her address at 85, Warwick Road. Neither his mother, Jeannie Cowan, nor his sister, Louie, was in favour of this marriage and probably did everything they could – if not to prevent it from happening – then to terminate it. It is said that they had some suspicion about Isabella's identity and history.

Royal Air Force records of 1942 state that Raeburn was separated from his wife. There is no official record of a divorce, nor of an annulment in the Registers of the Divorce Courts of England and Wales. However, it is possible that the marriage was annulled – or that they were divorced – in Scotland. According to many family members, Raeburn took Isabella Rae often to family gatherings.

In his biography of Henry Raeburn Dobson, Dr. Cabris refers to his marriage to Isabel Rae Smith Dawson. This marriage took place in 1939 and according to Dr. Cabris, did not last long as in 1942 his RAF record shows that he was separated from his wife although no record of a divorce seems to be available. It is also stated that while his mother and sister did not like his wife and were somewhat suspicious of her stated history, Raeburn's nephews and nieces and other members of his family very much enjoyed her company.

Isabella moved to London early in the war years where she worked as a telephonist. In 1945 Isabella married Capt. William J Stangel of the USAF.

In later years Isabella married an RAF sergeant.

Isabella died in 1983 having been ill for some time.

== Raeburn's World War record ==
During the Second World War, he joined the Royal Air Force (RAF), interpreting photographs of enemy positions made by RAF reconnaissance flights. He probably got his training for this in the secret quarters of Medmenham. He joined the RAF as an ordinary airman (aircrew) in 1942. He is recorded as being '5-foot 8 inches and having brown eyes, brown hair and a fresh complexion'. On 16 June 1943 he was commissioned as officer. He was granted a commission as an Acting Pilot Officer on 17 June 1943. On 3 March 1944 he was promoted to Flying Officer. He was demobilised on 12 February 1946, but kept on the reserve until he relinquished it on 10 February 1954.

After the Invasion, Raeburn served under the command of Air Marshal Sir Arthur Coningham in Paris, and continued to serve as an Interpreter until his demobilisation in 1946. Raeburn became well acquainted with the Air Marshal and attended many parties on his yacht in Cannes. In a letter to his sister, Raeburn wrote : " …we are leaving on the yacht at 10.30. A very large party today. 20 people. Four Princes (one the Prince of Monaco) and goodness knows how many Counts and Countesses are coming. What a life ! Phyllis would be in her element among all this life. I have a nice wee girl friend, daughter of the Prince de Faucigny-Lucinge, a Rothschild, and one of the oldest families in France. She's a darling...." But, he found life on the French Riviera quite frustrating. He wrote to his sister : " …This place is demoralising. One can't settle to write or do anything. I am having the usual difficulties to be expected painting an air marshal on holiday {the Air Marshal and Lady Coningham had left France for England}, but I will win in the end...."

His cousin Andrew Blackwood Dobson remembered : "…I do recall him telling me (or Dad) that he did follow in the front line RAF behind the lines into Europe, interpreting photo reconnaissance as the invasion advanced and that in his spare time he drew portraits of fellow officers in the mess. I think it was through this activity that he met Belgians during the advance through Belgium...." while another cousin Andrew Njal Dobson remembered especially the viewer and stereographs Raeburn had used during the war.

In July 1944, The Times of London published a rather bizarre obituary of Henry Raeburn. The reason for this obituary is not known. But the (very much alive) painter was alarmed by this slight "error". In The Times of Monday 7 August 1944 he wrote: "...Mr. Henry Raeburn Dobson, the Scottish portrait painter, who is at present serving with the R.A.F., wishes to be known that the NOTICE of his DEATH through enemy action is UNTRUE...."

== Post-war years ==
After the War, Raeburn left London and went back to live in Edinburgh. It was also around that time that his Belgian 'adventure' started (see further).

His first own post-war studio in Edinburgh was at 12, Shandwick Place, in the Georgian part of the city. He occupied this studio from 1941 until 1947. Before that, he had been exhibiting at the gallery of the art dealer and collector Mathieson, in Frederick Street. It was in Shandwick Place that the portraits of Bill, Janette and Andrew Blackwood Dobson, his cousins, were painted. No. 12 is now a nightclub. In Raeburn's time however it contained suites of showrooms and studios, while on the top floor there might have been an apartment.

Raeburn's studios always faced north. Raeburn indeed always rented spaces facing north, because northern light is the best light for painting. He especially liked to paint when the sky was bright blue with some clouds at the horizon, to reflect the northern light.

Around the end of the 1940 he met his life companion, Miss Evelyn Wight. They met at the Royal Scottish Dance Society in Edinburgh. Evelyn Agnes Mark Wight, the daughter of George Wight and Catharina Mark, born 26 July 1900 in Edinburgh.

She died from a heart attack at her home at 13, Leamington Terrace, Edinburgh on 2 April 1985, only a few weeks before Raeburn's own death.

Raeburn's studio at Mavisbush Lodge in Polton, Lasswade, near Edinburgh.

We do not know whether Raeburn could not marry Evelyn because he was in fact still married to Isabella Rae, whether he simply would not give marriage a second try after the rather disastrous first attempt or whether unmarried life actually suited him. Raeburn would always refer to her as "Miss Wight" and would never take her to official events, and hardly ever to family events.

From 1950 until 1964, Raeburn exhibited in the Royal Scottish Academy and maybe in the Scottish Liberal Club. But, besides an inscription on the reverse side of the first portrait of the Bishop of Bath and Wells stating that his address was at the Liberal Club in Edinburgh, no written proof about the latter has been found.

In 1956 he exhibited a portrait of Stewart McKechnie in McLellan Galleries in Sauchiehall Street, Glasgow.

Around 1965, he moved his studio to the Lasswade area, at Mavisbush Lodge, in Polton. The upper floor of the coach house (a long rectangular space) was transformed into his studio in 1965. Raeburn then knew it as Mavisbush Lodge, but it has since been renamed Priorwood Lodge. The Lodge was owned by one of his cousins, who set up this work space in the attic of the house.

In the early 1970s, when the Lodge was sold, Raeburn moved his studio from Polton to his one bedroom flat on the first floor of 5, Fettes Row, on the edge of Edinburgh's New Town, which he had bought earlier on.

Around that time Raeburn started to have serious physical problems and at the end of the 1970 his eyesight started to fade and he started to suffer from arteriosclerosis.

== Raeburn in Belgium ==
Raeburn's career in Belgium started after the hostilities of World War II, in 1946. In August 1945 he was still serving under Marshall Arthur Coningham in Paris. In April 1946 he wrote a letter to his mother from the house of a Madame Duchateau at the fashionable address of 52, avenue Jeanne/Johannalaan in Ixelles (Brussels), telling that he was just about to furnish his painter's studio.

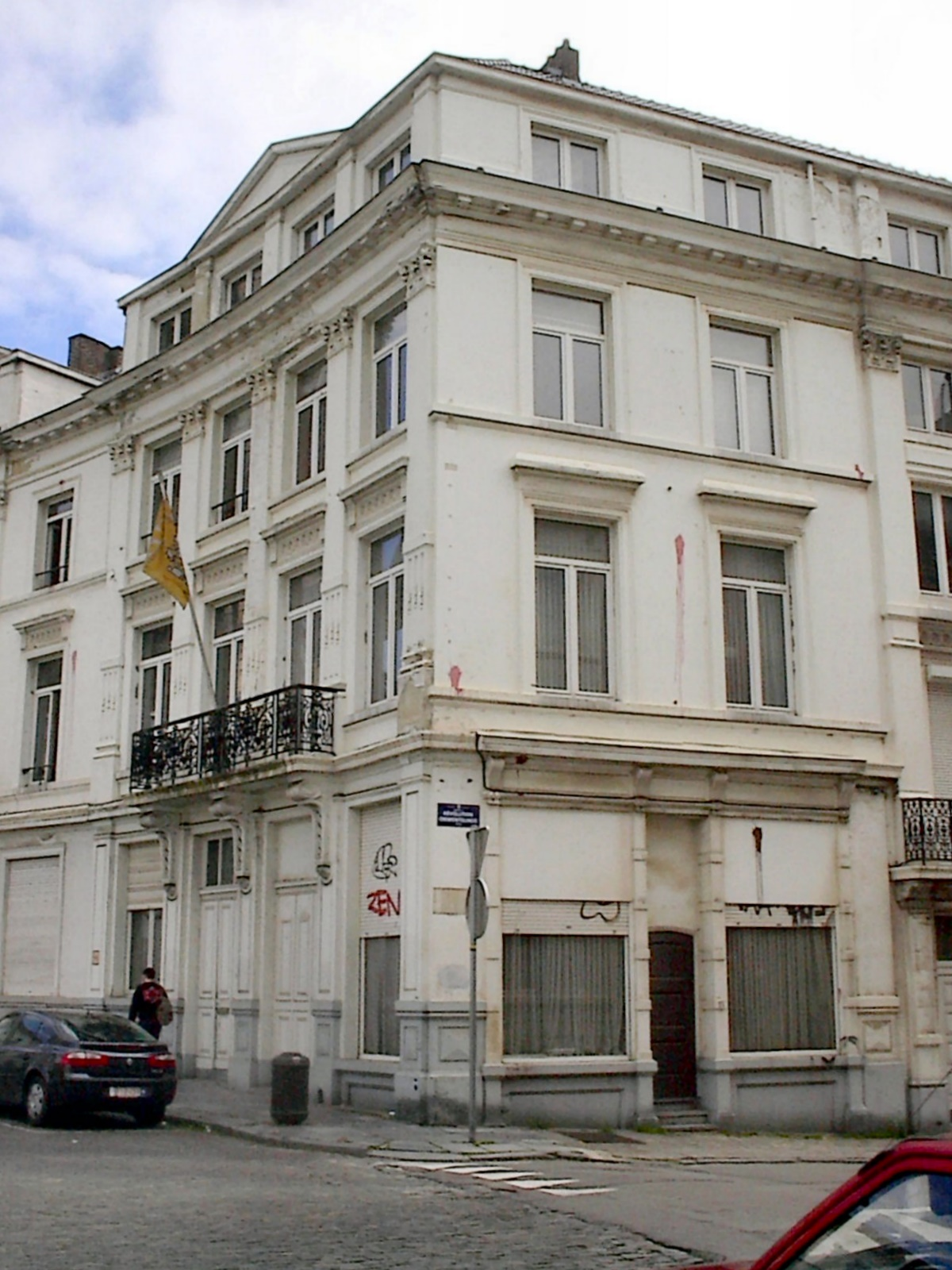
Henry Raeburn's Brussels studio on the third floor of 11, place des Barricades / Barricadenplein

This lady is said to have had a son killed during the War and asked Dobson to paint a portrait of her son, from a photograph. However, there is a doubt about the identity of the dead son, because in a letter to his mother dd. 11 April 1946 Raeburn wrote : "…My first snag took place yesterday, however. Mr. Marshall, whose portrait I started when I was over before heard only yesterday morning that his son, who had been missing for a year was actually shot by the Germans last spring. His body has been identified. Mr. Marshall is extremely cut up at this definite news and won't be able to sit for a week or two I fear. He is not a young man. First snag !! I wonder when the next one will crop up and what form it will take.…"

It is therefore more likely that the portrait of the dead 'son' which introduced Raeburn in Belgian High Society was the portrait of the son of Mr. Marshall and not of Madame Duchateau.

The portrait was such a success, that Raeburn was recommended as portrait painter to countess de Liedekerke, Madeleine Beckaert, who recommended him to many other Belgian aristocratic families. Raeburn became well befriended with some of these Belgian families, especially with the family of Baroness Cécile Van Houtte-de Stella, with the Carton de Tournai and with Princess Léontine de Ligne de Lambertye-Gerbéviller. He stayed extensive times at their castles and was invited to the wedding of Baron Van Houtte's daughter. He even arranged for his cousin Janette Dobson in 1955 to act as an 'au pair' to the family of H. Baron Carton de Tournai of Bonsecours, near Perluwez, Belgium.

In Brussels, he set his first studio up in April 1946 (see above) at 11, place des Barricades/Barricadenplein. In a letter to his mother of 11 April of that year he wrote: "… Yesterday I organized my studio. What a beautiful light. I have had a store put in and have got an easel throne, chair, table on loan.…" Since the end of the War, Raeburn would come every year to Belgium for three or four months, to look for and to work at his commissions.

Later he moved his studio to the socially far less acceptable area of Saint-Josse-ten-Noode (Brussels). But, as many of his customers refused to come to this ill-famed borough, Raeburn went to their homes and resided there for an extended period of time while painting the family portraits.

In 1974, while painting the portraits of Countess Lippens and of Monsieur Jadot, he felt ill and suddenly went back to Edinburgh. He never finished either portrait. After 1975, he only shortly visited Brussels on several occasions, and gave the impression of being very forgetful and confused at times. He suffered from arteriosclerosis, which lead to anterograde amnesia and finally to senile dementia.

== Last years ==
Raeburn's last years were quite difficult. Because of his arteriosclerosis, he was unable to care for himself. In 1977, his eyesight started to fade. In that very year, he started a watercolour portrait of Kirsten Doughty the daughter of his friend Margaret Doughty, née McKechnie. However, due to his fading eyesight, the portrait became a disaster. Raeburn was well aware of this and promised Margaret a new portrait of her daughter. It took him two years to complete this work, which would prove to be his last.

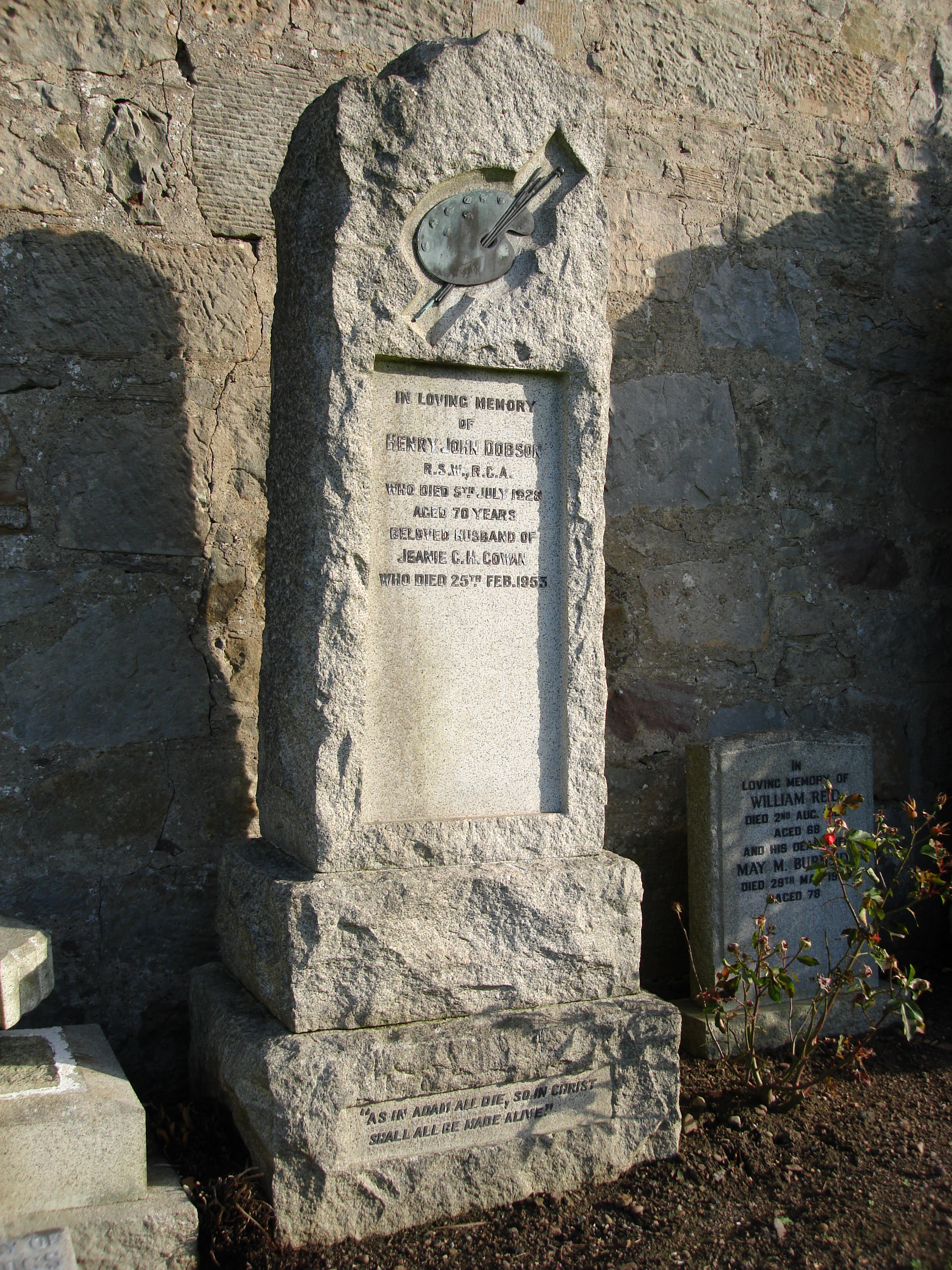
Henry Raeburn's (and his parents') grave in Mortonhall, on the outskirts of Edinburgh, Morton Hall Cemetery, Edinburgh.

On 31 January 1979, Raeburn wrote to Margaret Doughty, née McKechnie, in an ailing handwriting:

"My Dear Margaret, Do please forgive me for never having written to you to acknowledge receipt of your lovely letter with all the nice compliments for the portrait of Kersten. It was grand to know it was so well liked: and I thank you for your cheque for £52.50p. in payment thereof. I am beginning to find life is getting a bit too hectic for me at my age, and I shall have to pack-up soon. It is a tremendous job for me to face – The giving up of this flat and all my work. I think the portrait of Kersten will be one of the very last I shall paint. Thank you again for your lovely letter & cheque. I hope we meet sometime soon. Love to you both. Raeburn. PS. I shall take your cheque to my bank today."

Around 1980, Raeburn's mental health deteriorated dramatically. Baroness Van Houtte reports that Raeburn would visit her unannounced, while thinking he had an appointment.

The last time she saw him, he looked quite bewildered. Around that time, Margaret Doughty, née McKechnie met him a last time, walking on the Edinburgh streets. During the conversation, Margaret realised he did not know who she was and that he had very much mentally declined.

Shortly after the completion of the portrait of Kirsten Doughty (1980), Raeburn left his flat on the border of Georgian Edinburgh for "The Elms", a nursing home outside the city centre, run by the Church of Scotland.

He stayed there for several years, until he moved in his last days to Grange Care, a private nursing home for the incapacitated elderly, at 8, Chalmers Crescent. There, he died on 22 May 1985 at 21.40 hours of a stroke (cerebrovascular accident).

His remains were cremated and his ashes were adjoined to the grave of his parents, Henry John Dobson and Jeanie Cowan in Mortonhall Cemetery, on the outskirts of Edinburgh.

Reaburn did not have any children. He left a testament, leaving his few goods mainly to Evelyn and some friends, while his house was sold to cover his debts and cremation. In his will he did not leave any notice about the future copyright of his paintings.

== Character ==
Raeburn's Scottish origins were essential to him; in Scotland and abroad he would constantly wear his kilt and typical chequered waistcoat.

Raeburn painted for the love of his art, as money was no object to him. Although he had many commissions and was regarded as Edinburgh's best portrait painter, he mostly lived from hand to mouth or from commission to commission. It must be stated that, while his brother Cowan had the benefits from the commercial talents of his wife, Phyllis Bowyer, Raeburn could rely on anybody to promote him or his talents.

Although he had been influenced by the Modern Movement, through his art teacher Ralph Hay, he refused to conform to the later emerging Modernist Movement, while the backbench politics of the Royal Scottish Academy made him rebel even more against this closed circle of painters.

== Painting technique ==
Raeburn used often cheaper materials, which he bought at the art shop of John Mathieson and at Aitkin Dott Galleries (in Fredrick Street) in Edinburgh. His canvas consisted mostly of industrial prepared thin linen, with a thin layer of grounding (singled primed), prepared by "Winsor and Newton Ltd., London" or by "Robertson & Co. Ltd., London".

The canvasses were nailed onto the frames with small black head nails. Raeburn used industrial prepared but stable paint (Winton), which has kept its original colour. He always used bright and lively colours and used light impastos to represent fabrics. He was a master in painting hands (the most difficult part of a portrait).

His varnish technique was far from good. It seems he varnished his paintings while they were still on the easel, instead of lying down. This made the varnish dripping down and be unevenly spread over the painting, resulting in areas of high reflection, followed by matt areas. However, the different patches in the reflection of the varnish also indicates that Raeburn did not only varnish his paintings vertically, but that in addition, he let his paintings dry for a too short while, before varnishing them. Because of the different drying times of oil paints, this meant that the varnish did not dry evenly (polymerisation). The varnish (Damart) seems in all paintings to be quite stable.

Most of the portraits are still in a good state, although most of the canvasses were not properly stretched onto their frames (2004–2009).

== Work ==
The work of Raeburn Dobson stretches over a period of about 60 years.

His heyday was from the 1950 until early 1970. He was indeed befriended with the famous Chief Constable of the Lothian and Peebles Constabulary William Merrilees (who wrote The Short Arm of the Law, John Long Ltd, London, 1966) and painted two portraits of him. On the reverse of the portrait of Count Wenceslas de 'tSerclaes is a small thank-you card from the Chief Constable, attached to the frame. Count Wenceslas had met Merrilees in the 1960s in Brussels and when talking about Scotland realised Merrilees was friendly with Raeburn. The thank-you card represented the two photographs of Merrilees in disguise, and ordinary members of the general public.

His wartime experience brought him to Belgium, where he became 'the' portrait painter of an exclusive aristocratic circle.

He was very reserved and hardly ever spoke about his private life or about his paintings.

His work consisted for the major part of portraits. Like his father, he also painted some watercolours and genre paintings.

When Henry Raeburn came to Belgium in 1945, his art of portraiture was already relegated to the past, redeemed as "passé", as "boardroom painting" or as "commercial painting"; and himself redeemed as being a mere "society painter".

Through his paintings one may also spot Raeburn's interest in the sitter. One may say he probably had more pleasure in painting pretty and elegant woman, like Baroness Van Houtte, Baroness Velge, Countess d'Oultremont, or Mrs. McHardy and the Lady with White Pearls. However, he also enjoyed painting men in uniform, especially Scottish uniforms or Clan dresses.

It seems that he paid more attention to the paintings of the aristocracy and to those of his own friends and family, than to the ordinary executive. Raeburn had great trouble to put an element of fascination in these portraits.

Although Raeburn did not seem to have had the means to lead the high-life, he certainly did everything to approach himself as close to it as possible. In London this meant moving around in fashionable places to be amongst potential clientele. Even in Brussels the painter would move around in the upper classes. But, there he got himself a studio in a not so well-to-do area of the Belgian capital, at the Place des Barricades, above a 'bistro'.

When the jet-set did not want to take their way to the painter's studio, Raeburn had no reluctance to go and stay at the private homes and castles of his clients. He stayed an extensive time at Baron Velge's residence, with Mrs. Jadot, with Viscount Le Hardÿ de Beaulieu, with Baron Etienne della Faille d'Huysse and in Scotland with the Marquess of Huntly. And with many more sitters.

Raeburn did not get on well with the art-establishment in Edinburgh. Although influenced by the 'Colourists', he refused to conform to the Modernist movement, while the politics of the Royal Academy made him rebel even more against this closed circle. Although he would stay faithful to traditional portraiture, he could not ignore this 'Colourist' Movement. One may note this Modernist influence of the 'Colourists' in his colourful palette and contrasting colours. He must have been informed about the philosophy and the work of this movement through a very good female friend in these circles.

His portraits are always faithful representations of the sitters. Many of the portraits still resemble the sitters. But, sometimes he embellishes the sitter by adding some mannerist hands. Fascinated by hands, he always included some hands into a portrait (when possible). But, generally they do not represent the hands of the sitter. They are – especially with woman portraits – a mannerist way to add more grace and elegance to the sitter. Baroness Van Houtte's and Baroness Velge's hands are indeed stockier than the hands Raeburn painted, while the position of the hand of Countess de Liedekerke is anatomically quite impossible, as are the hands of Countess d'Oultremont. One notices the elongated fingers in the portraits of Baroness Van Houtte, Countess d'Oultremont and Countess de Liedekerke.

Not all of his paintings are of the same quality. He had great trouble with painting group portraits and the perspectives are not always correct. This may well be because Raeburn was never trained academically.

== Index of portraits ==
Photographs of these portraits are to be found in the archives of the National Portrait Gallery, London.

1. Dated and verified Portraits of which the Sitters are known.

Portrait of Sir Richard Arman Gregory (1864–1952), scientist, Oil on Canvas, 76.8 cm x 63.9 cm, Signed "Raeburn Dobson", dated on the reverse 1929.
Portrait of Christiane Leslie, Signed "H Raeburn Dobson", c. 1930s. The reverse mentions that the painting was 91.44 cm x 71.12 cm and was Oil on Canvas.
Portrait of D. Brodie McDonald in Kilt, Signed "H Raeburn Dobson", c. 1930–1932.
Portrait of Cpt. J. McK-McKernell-Brown, "An Gaidheal Gorm", Signed "H Raeburn Dobson", 1933.
Portrait of Lt.-Col. W.B.J. Osbaldeston-Mitford, in Gordon Highlander dress, Signed "H Raeburn Dobson", 1934
Portrait of Robert Walpole, 9th Baron Walpole and 7th Lord Walpole of Wolterton (1913–1989), son of Horatio Spencer Walpole (1881–1918), Oil on Canvas, 100 cm x 75 cm, Signed "H Raeburn Dobson", c. 1935–1936.
Portrait of the Hon. Pamela Walpole (1908–1986), M.B.E., daughter of Horatio Spencer Walpole (1881–1918), 7th and 9th baron Walpole, Oil on Canvas, 100 cm x 75 cm, Signed "H. Raeburn Dobson", c. 1935–1936
Portrait of the young Douglas Morpeth (°1924), aged 12, in the Kilt of the MacKie Clan, Oil on Canvas, 160 cm x 100 cm, Signed "H Raeburn Dobson", c. 1936
Portrait of Lieutenant General Air Vice Marshal His Highness Maharaja Umaid Singh (1903–1947) (full), Oil on Canvas, lifesize, c. 1937. Coll.of the Umaid Bhawan Palace, Jodhpur, India.
Portrait of the young Douglas Morpeth (°1924) aged 12, in the uniform of Hillsborough Prep School, Oil on Canvas, 97 cm x 76.5 cm, Signed "H Raeburn Dobson", 1937.
Portrait of Cameron Morpeth (°1927), aged 10, Oil on canvas, 127 cm x 80.2 cm, Signed "H Raeburn Dobson", c. 1937.
Portrait of D.B. McDonald, Esq., Signed "H Raeburn Dobson", 1937.
Portrait of Alan Sutherland (°1931) as a Loretto Nipper, Oil on Canvas, 76.2 cm x 63.5 cm, Signed "H Raeburn Dobson", c. 1940.
Portrait of Louisa Rankin Morpeth, née Dobson (c. 1896), sister of Henry Raeburn, Oil on Canvas, 44.7 cm x 34.5 cm, c. before 1940.
Portrait of David Williams (AKA Dave Willis) (1895–1973), comedian, Oil on Canvas, 61 cm x 50.6 cm, Signed "H Raeburn Dobson", c. 1940.
Portrait of Lady Baird, Oil on Canvas, 76.2 cm x 63.5 cm, Signed "H. Raeburn Dobson", c. 1940.
Portrait of Stroma Sutherland, Oil on Canvas, 76.2 cm x 63.5 cm, Signed "H Raeburn Dobson", c. 1940.
Portrait of an A.R.P. Warden from Kensington, Signed "H Raeburn Dobson", 1940.
Portrait of Janette Dobson (°1937), Oil on Canvas, 61 cm x 51 cm, Signed "H Raeburn Dobson", c. 1941–1942.
Portrait of William Sharpe Dobson III (°1934), Oil on Canvas, 61 cm x 51 cm, Signed "H Raeburn Dobson", c. 1942
Portrait of 7/Lt. Don Irvindale, "Our Catering Type", Signed "H Raeburn Dobson", 1945.
Portrait of Louisa Rankin Morpeth, née Dobson (°1896), sister of Henry Raeburn, Oil on Canvas, 44.7 cm x 34.5 cm, c. 1946.
Portrait of Andrew Blackwood Dobson (°1941), Oil on Canvas, 61 cm x 51 cm., Signed "H Raeburn Dobson", c. 1946–1947.
Portrait of Baron Henry Carton de Tournai (1878–1969), Oïl on Canevas, 80 cm x 65 cm, Signed "H Raeburn Dobson", c. 1946–1947.
Portrait of Douglas Charles Lindsey Gordon (°1908), 12th Marquess of Huntly and Premier Marquess of Scotland in full highland dress, Oil on Canvas, 110.5 cm x 85.05 cm, Signed "H Raeburn Dobson", 1946–1947
Portrait of Baroness Magdeleine Carton de Tournai (1916–2001), sister of Baron Michel Carton de Tournai, Oil on Canvas, 80 cm x 65 cm, signed "H Raeburn Dobson", c. 1948–1949.
Portrait of Baron Jean Van Houtte (1907–1991), Prime Minister of Belgium, Finance Minister, President of Sabena Airlines, Oil on Canvas, 110 cm x 80 cm, Signed "H Raeburn Dobson", c. 1949.
Portrait of Mr. Cameron Morpeth (°1927), Oil on Canvas, 59.6 cm x 49.5 cm, Signed "H Raeburn Dobson", c.1949.
Portrait of Dr. James Charles Thomson (1887–1960), Oil on Canvas, 136 cm x 99 cm, signed "H Raeburn Dobson", 1949–1950.
Portrait of Lady Anne Morpeth (°1928), née Bell, wife of Sir Douglas Morpeth, Oil on Canvas, 51 cm x 63 cm, Signed "H Raeburn Dobson", c. 1950.
Portrait of Robert Spottiswoode Morpeth (1894–1979), father of Sir Douglas Morpeth, Oil on Canvas, 90 cm x 70 cm, Signed "Raeburn Dobson", c. 1950.
Portrait of Baroness Cécile Van Houtte (°1908), née de Stella, Oil on Canvas, 110 cm x 80 cm, signed "H Raeburn Dobson", c. 1953.
Portrait of the Bishop of Bath and Wells, Bishop Harold William Bradfield (Bishop 1946–1960), Signed "H Raeburn Dobson", 1954. There are two inscriptions on the back: Along middle stretcher, in ink: "The Rt Rev.The Lord Bishop of Bath & Wells Original Painting by H Raeburn Dobson. R.C.A.September 1954. Edinburgh". On top stretcher, right-hand side, in pencil: "H Raeburn Dobson Liberal Club Edinburgh".
Portrait of Count Charles de Liedekerke (1897–1965), Oil on Canvas, 92 cm x 70 cm, Signed "H Raeburn Dobson", dated 1954.
Portrait of Countess Madeleine de Liedekerke (1903–1980), née Baroness Bekaert, Oil on Canvas, 60 cm x 50 cm, Signed "H Raeburn Dobson", c. 1954–1955
First version of the Portrait of Count Charles-Emile Antoine d'Oultremont (°1915), Oil on Canvas, 87 cm x 64 cm, Signed "H Raeburn Dobson", c. 1955.
Second version of the Portrait of Count Charles-Emile Antoine d'Oultremont (°1915), Oil on Canvas, 80 cm x 64 cm, not signed, c. 1955.
Portrait of Countess Béatrice d'Oultremont, née Baroness van der Straten Waillet (°1920), Oil on Canvas, 80 cm x 64 cm, Signed "H Raeburn Dobson", c. 1955.
Portrait of Kevin Connolly of Edinburgh, Oil on Canvas, 110 cm x 80 cm, Signed "H Raeburn Dobson", c. 1955–1960.
Second version of the portrait of Kevin Connolly of Edinburgh, Signed "H Raeburn Dobson", c. 1955–1960.
Portrait of Mrs. Margaret Doughty (°1947), née McKechnie, Oil on Canvas, 61 cm x 51 cm, signed "H Raeburn Dobson", c. 1956.
Portrait of Stewart McKechnie (°1944) as a Watson's Boy, Oil on Canvas, 61 cm x 51 cm, Signed "H Raeburn Dobson", c. 1956.
Portrait of a Belgian Business Man, Oil on Canvas, measurements unknown, Signed "H Raeburn Dobson", 1956.
Portrait of Baron Jean-Charles Velge (°1930), Oil on Canvas, 60 cm x 50 cm, Signed "H Raeburn Dobson", c. 1956–1957
Portrait of a Lady with White Pearls (sitter unknown), Oil on Canvas, 76.2 cm x 60.96 cm, Signed "H Raeburn Dobson", c. 1955.
Portrait of Dr. Sir Stanley Davidson, M.D., (1894–1981), Haematologist, President of the Royal College of Physicians and of the Royal Infirmary, Oil on Canvas, 89 cm x 69 cm, Signed "H Raeburn Dobson", 1957
Portrait of Count Etienne della Faille d'Huysse (°1892), Oil on Canvas, 90 cm x 70 cm, Signed "H Raeburn Dobson", c. 1957.
Portrait of Baroness Elisabeth Massange de Collombs, née della Faille d'Huysse (°1935), Oil on Canvas, 49 cm x 39 cm, Signed "H Raeburn Dobson", 1957–1958.
Portrait of Mrs. Thérèse De Smet, née Van Houtte (°1935), daughter of Baron and Baroness Jean Van Houtte, Oil on Canvas, 68 cm x 60 cm, Signed "H Raeburn Dobson", c. 1958.
Portrait of Mrs. Anne-Elisabeth De Bandt (°1938), née Van Houtte, daughter of Baron and Baroness Jean Van Houtte, Oil on Canvas,68 cm x 60 cm, Signed "H Raeburn Dobson", c. 1958.
Portrait of Viscount Jean-Pierre Le Hardÿ de Beaulieu (°1926) and his family, Oil on Canvas, 78 cm x 62 cm, Signed "H Raeburn Dobson", c. 1959.
Portrait of Viscount Jean le Hardÿ de Beaulieu (°1890), father of Viscount Jean-Pierre Le Hardÿ de Beaulieu, Oil on Canvas, 60 cm x 50 cm, Signed "H Raeburn Dobson", c. 1959.
Portrait of Viscount Philippe Le Hardy de Beaulieu (°1921), Oil on Canvas, 60 cm x 50 cm, Signed "H Raeburn Dobson", c. 1959.
Portrait of Princess Albert-Eduard de Ligne, née de Lambertye, (Gerbevillers, France), Oil on Canvas, Signed "H Raeburn Dobson", 1959–1960.
Portrait of Dr. Andrew Rae Gilchrist, M.D., (°1899), Cardiologist, President of the Royal College of Physicians and of the Royal Infirmary in Edinburgh, Oil on Canvas, 89 cm x 69 cm, Signed "H Raeburn Dobson", 1960.
Second (copy by Raeburn himself of the) Portrait of the Bishop of Bath and Wells, Bishop Harold William Bradfield (Bishop 1946–1960), Signed "H Raeburn Dobson", 1960–61.
Portrait of Count Wenceslas de 't Serclaes (°1924), Oil on Canvas,80 cm x 70 cm, Signed "H Raeburn Dobson", c. 1960–1965.
Portrait of Miss Jean C. Milligan, Co-Founder and Chairwoman of the Royal Scottish Country Dance Society, Oil on Canvas, 89.5 cm x 69 cm, c. 1961.
Portrait of Mr. André Pirmez, Esq. (°1922), son of Baron Herman Pirmez and Baroness Emilie del Marmol, Oil on Canvas, 76 cm x 63.5 cm, Signed "H Raeburn Dobson", c. 1962–1965.
Portrait of Baroness Marie-Louise Velge, née Van Houtte, Oil on Canvas, 60 cm x 50 cm, Signed "H Raeburn Dobson", 1963
Portrait of Mr. Donald Fortune, Oil on Canvas, 76.2 cm x 63.5 cm, Signed "H Raeburn Dobson", 1963.
Portrait of Mrs. Fortune, mother of Donald Fortune, Oil on 76.2 cm x 63.5 cm, Signed "H Raeburn Dobson", 1963.
Portrait of Mr. McHardy(°1920), Oil on Canvas, 107 cm x 87 cm, Signed "H Raeburn Dobson", 1964.
Portrait of Mrs. Charlie McHardy (°1928), Oil on Canvas, 108 cm x 89 cm, Signed "H Raeburn Dobson", 1964.
Portrait of Sir John Dutton Clerk, 10th Baronet and Lady Clerk of Penicuik, Oil on Canvas, 111 cm x 86.4 cm, Signed "H Raeburn Dobson", c. 1965.
Second version of the portrait of Sir John Dutton (10th Bt) and Lady Clerk of Penicuik, Signed "H Raeburn Dobson", c. 1965.
Portrait of Madame Jacqueline Pirmez, née Bekaert, Oil on Canvas, 76 cm x 63.5 cm, c. 1965
Portrait of Madame Isabelle Jadot (°1928), née Velge, Oil on Canvas, 70 cm x 55 cm, Signed "H Raeburn Dobson", c. 1965.
Portrait of Helen Finlayson (°1944), née McKechnie, Oil on Canvas, 50.5 cm x 61 cm, Signed "H Raeburn Dobson", c. 1965.
Portrait of Ian Morpeth (°1953) as a Fettes College Boy, son of Sir Douglas Morpeth, Oil on Canvas, 51 cm x 40.5 cm, Signed "H Raeburn Dobson", c. 1969–1970.
Portrait of Christophe Velge (°1963), as child, son of Baron Jean-Jacques Velge, Oil on Canvas, 60 cm x 50 cm, Signed "H Raeburn Dobson", 1965.
Portrait of Mr. and Mrs. Graham Watson and family, Signed "H Raeburn Dobson", 1966. (This Graham Watson is not related to the English LibDem MEP.)
Portrait of Charles Robert Dobson Morpeth (°1960), as child, son of Cameron Morpeth, Oil on Canvas, 91.5 cm x 87.6 cm, Signed "H Raeburn Dobson", c. 1970.
Portrait of Robin Law, Signed "H Raeburn Dobson", 1970.
Portrait of the Lord Provost of Edinburgh Sir Herbert Archbold Brechin, Oil on Canvas, measurements unknown, Signed "H Raeburn Dobson", 1971.
Group Portrait of the Children Morpeth, Oil on Canvas, 76 cm x 91.5 cm, Signed "H Raeburn Dobson", c. 1972.
Portrait of Dr. Anne Cameron Robbins, M.D., née Gauld (°1951), daughter of Dr. John Gauld, M.D., Oil on Canvas, 63 cm x 76 cm, Signed "H Raeburn Dobson", February 1972
Unfinished Portrait of Mr. Philippe Jadot (°1929), Oil on Canvas, 100 cm x 76 cm, Signed "H Raeburn Dobson", c. 1974.
Portrait of R.A. Smith, Signed "H Raeburn Dobson", 1974.
Portrait of Mrs. Patricia Roxburgh, née Wilson (°1925), Canvas on Oil,48.2 cm x 38.1 cm, Signed "H Raeburn Dobson", c. 1975
Portrait of Mr. Carmichael, Canvas on Oil, Signed "H Raeburn Dobson", 1976.
Portrait of Michael Barker, Oil on Canvas, 60 cm x 70 cm, Signed "H Raeburn Dobson", 1976.

2. Verified Portraits which are not dated but of which the sitters are known.

Portrait of David Cowan Dobson, Raeburn's brother, Oil on Canvas, 61 cm x 51 cm, Signed "H Raeburn Dobson"
Portrait of Evelyn Agnes Mark Wight (1900–1985), Raeburn's lifetime companion, Oil on Canvas, 76 cm x 64 cm, Signed "H Raeburn Dobson"
Portrait of Jeannie Charlotte Hannah Cowan, mother of Raeburn, Oil on Canvas, measurements unknown, Signed "H Raeburn Dobson"
Portrait of Mrs. Wishart, Edinburgh, Oil on Canvas, 76.2 cm x 63.5 cm; Signed "H Raeburn Dobson" The identity of this Mrs. Wishart is not known. Her name was written on the reverse of a photograph of her portrait.
Portrait of Mrs. Richardson, Oil on Canvas, measurements unknown, Signed "H Raeburn Dobson"
Portrait of Alasdair Alpin MacGregor (1899–1970), Scottish photographer and writer, Oil on Canvas 76.20 x 63.50 cm, "H Raeburn Dobson"
Portrait of Richard Durand Trotter in suit, Oil on Canvas, 127 cm x 101.5 cm, Signed "H Raeburn Dobson".
Portrait of Richard Durand Trotter in military uniform, Oil on Canvas, Signed "H Raeburn Dobson"
Portrait of Dr. D. Chambers of the Murray Royal Hospital in Perth, Scotland, Oil on Canvas, Signed "H Raeburn Dobson"
Portrait of Ian McGregor Bazalgette (head to waist), Oil on Canvas, Signed "H Raeburn Dobson"
Portraitof Ian McGregor Bazalgette (full), in Kilt, Oil on Canvas, Signed "H Raeburn Dobson"
Portrait of Irene McGregor, Oil on Canvas, Signed "H Raeburn Dobson"
Portrait of J. Riley Jones, Esq., Oil on Canvas, Signed "H Raeburn Dobson"
Portrait of the Chief Constable of the Lothians and Peebles William Merrilees in full Highlander Dress, Oil on Canvas, Signed "H Raeburn Dobson"
Portrait of Miss Jean Gray, Oil on Canvas, Signed "H Raeburn Dobson"
Portrait of Mrs. Alison Hunter, Oil on Canvas, Signed "H Raeburn Dobson"
Portrait of Miss Sight, Oil on Canvas, Signed "H Raeburn Dobson"
Portrait of Mrs. Linscke Gumley, Oil on Canvas, Signed "H Raeburn Dobson"
Portrait of Mrs. Maude Belgarde of Dublin, Oil on Canvas, Signed "H Raeburn Dobson"
Portrait of Mrs. McGregor, Oil on Canvas, Signed "H Raeburn Dobson"
Portrait of Sir Guy Patrick Gilbert Crofton, Bt., Oil on Canvas, Signed "H Raeburn Dobson"
Portrait of Sir John Ure Primrose, 3. Baronnet of Burnbrae (1908–1985), Oil on Canvas, Signed "H Raeburn Dobson"
Portrait of Sir William Watson, Oil on Canvas, Signed "H Raeburn Dobson"
Portrait of Rothesay Herald Lieutenant Colonel Harold Andrew Balvaird Lawson (Herald 1939–1981, +1985), Signed "H Raeburn Dobson"
Portrait of Mr. William Alford of New-York, USA, Signed "H Raeburn Dobson"
Portrait of Willy Dugaugier, Signed "H Raeburn Dobson"
Portrait of the Ballantyne Girls of Dunnesleithan (Ireland), Signed "H Raeburn Dobson"
Portrait of 'Mattie', Signed "H Raeburn Dobson"
Portrait of Professor Gordon Donaldson (1913–1993) in Departmental Robes (head to waist), Scottish Historian, Signed "H Raeburn Dobson",
Portrait of King George VI (after a photograph), Signed "H Raeburn Dobson"
Portrait of Admiral Sir Michael Denny, Signed "H Raeburn Dobson"
Portrait of Ian Stewart Robertson 3/4 length seated, wearing a dress kilt and jacket., Oil on Canvas, 110 cm x 85 cm, signed "H. Raeburn Dobson"

3. Verified portraits which are not identified and cannot be dated

twelve portraits (mostly) of business men (head to waist) are not identified and cannot be dated; of which a portrait (head to waist) of an oriental man and a man holding a gun.
three portraits woman (head to waist) are not identified and cannot be dated.
three portraits of children are not identified and cannot be dated; of which the "Portrait of a boy in a Navy Blue Sweater"(yellow background), Oil on Canvas, 60.96 cm x 50.8 cm, Signed "H Raeburn Dobson"

The boys in question are Malcolm (b. 1940), Nigel (1941–1947) and Douglas (b. 1944) Walker. The portraits were painted in Spring 1947 at a house in Pembroke Mews (or Walk), Kensington High Street. They remain in private hands

4.Known Portraits which have not been verified yet.

Portrait of Countess Lippens (Knokke, Belgium).
Portrait of Mrs. Albert de Radzitsky (Brussels, Belgium).
Portrait (unfinished) of Mrs. Joanna Reid (Nan), (Edinburgh, Scotland).
Portrait of Sir Ian Colquhoun of Luss (Cumtradden House, Luss, Alexandria, Scotland)
Portrait of Baron Braun (Ghent, Belgium)
Portrait of Countess Boël (Belgium)
Portrait of Count Yves du Monceau (Belgium)
Portrait of Countess de Prêt (Belgium)
