= Mountains and hills of Scotland =

Scotland is the most mountainous country in the United Kingdom. Scotland's mountain ranges can be divided in a roughly north to south direction into: the Scottish Highlands, the Central Belt and the Southern Uplands, the latter two primarily belonging to the Scottish Lowlands. The highlands eponymously contains the country's main mountain ranges, but hills and mountains are to be found south of these as well. The below lists are not exhaustive; there are countless subranges throughout the country.

Ben Nevis (Beinn Nibheis), the highest mountain in Scotland and the United Kingdom at 1,344.527 metres (4,411.18 ft), is in the Highland region at the western end of the Grampian Mountains. A Scottish mountain over 914.4 metres (3,000 ft) is referred to as a Munro, of which there are 282.

As of 2019, hundreds of thousands of people visit mountains in Scotland every winter and about 130,000 climb to the summit of Ben Nevis every year.

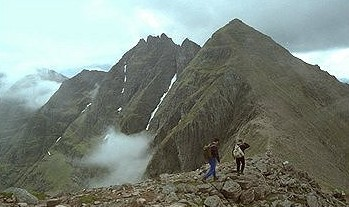
Sgurr Fiona and the Corrag Bhuidhe pinnacles on An Teallach

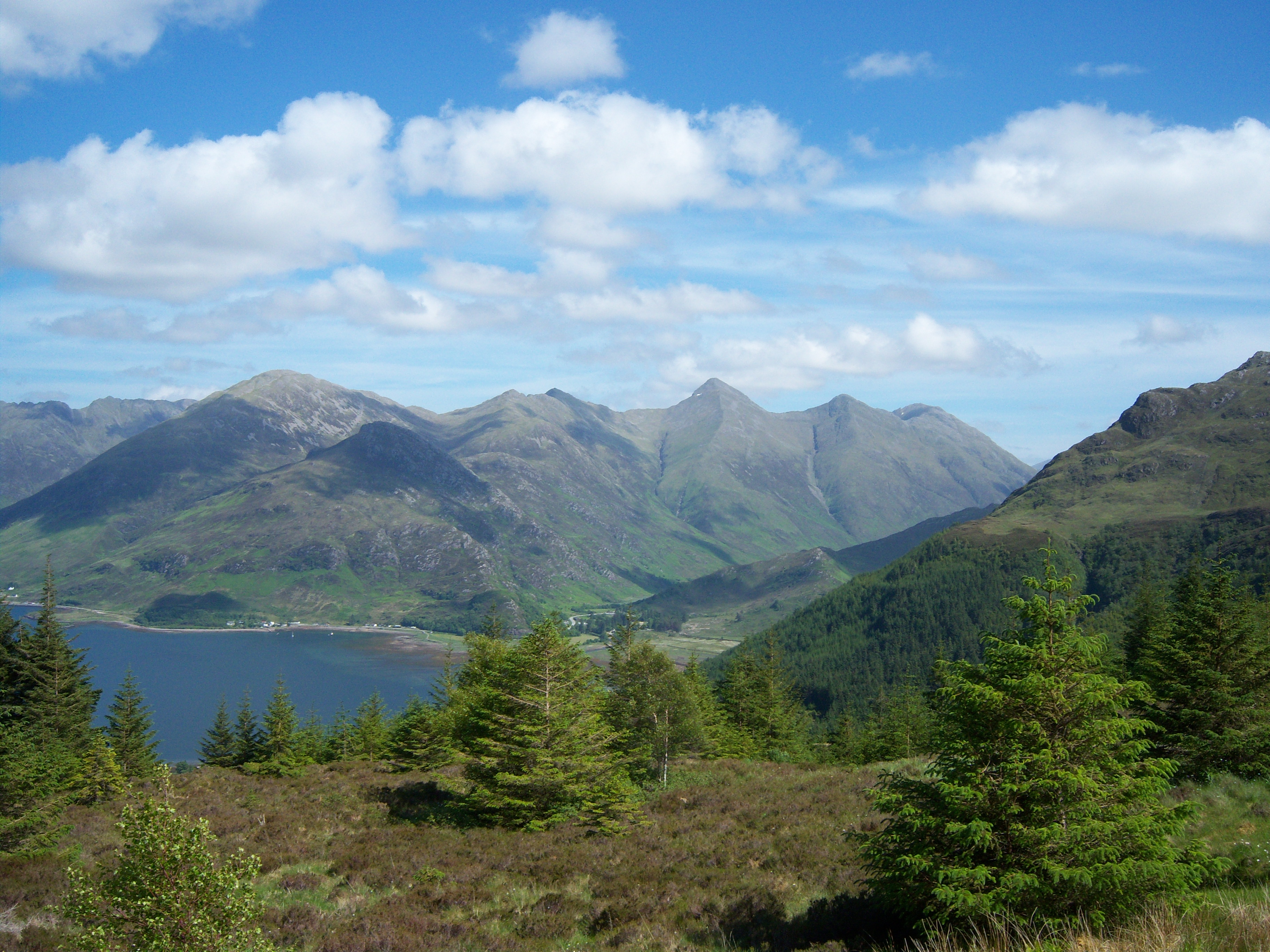
The Five Sisters of Kintail

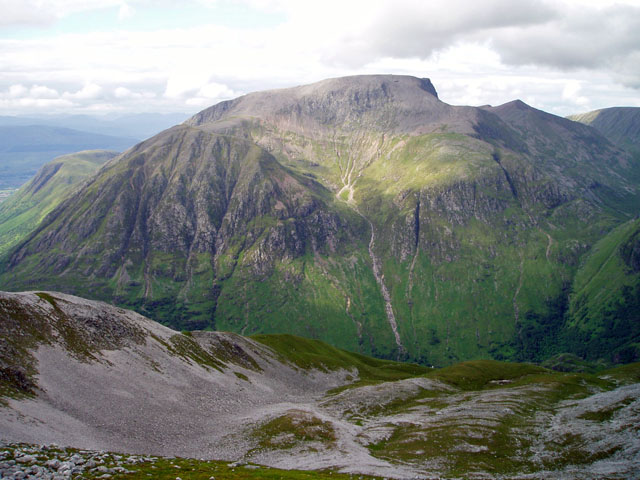
The steep south face of Ben Nevis from Sgurr a' Mhàim

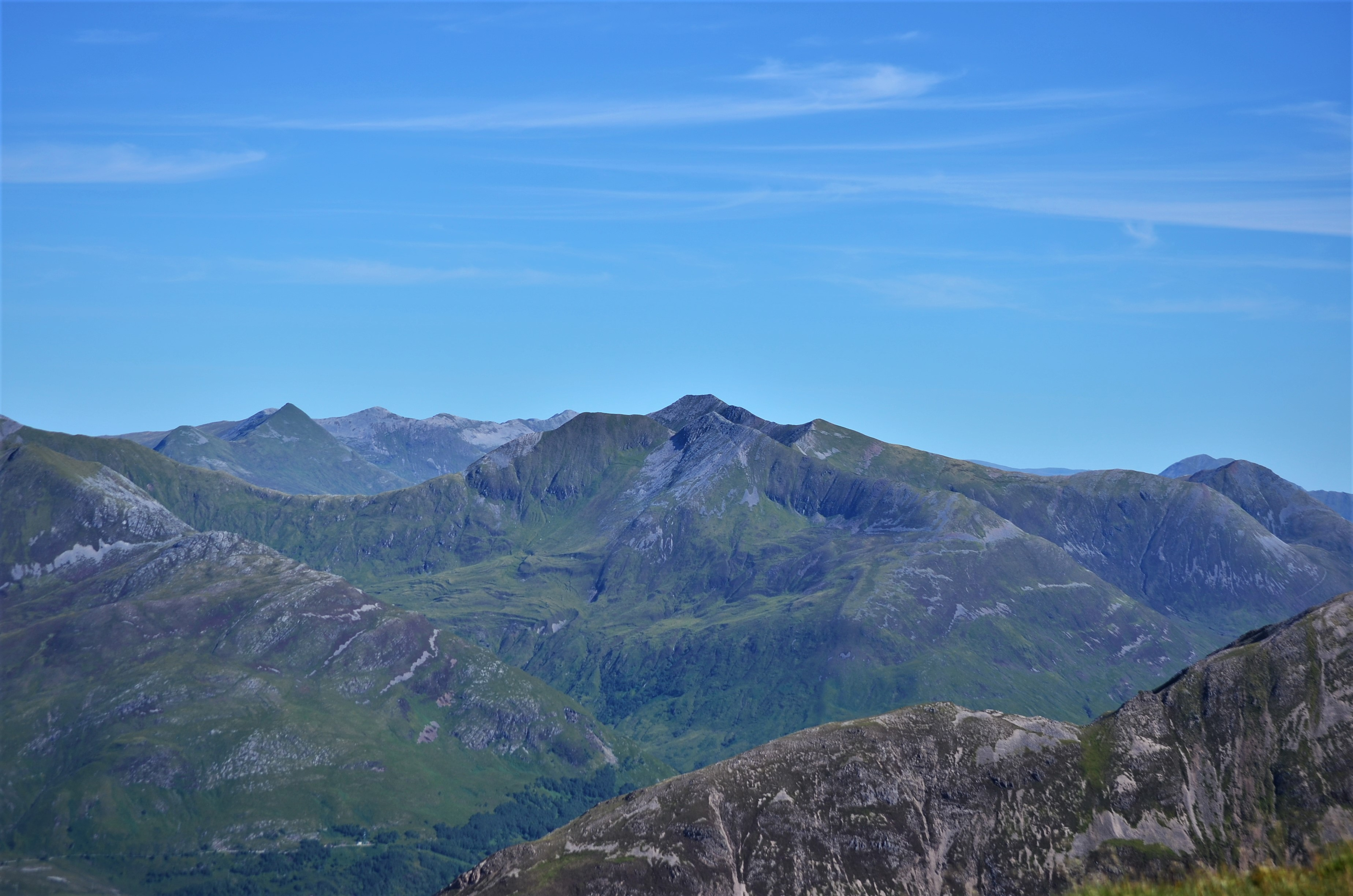
The eastern Mamores and Grey Corries from the Aonach Eagach

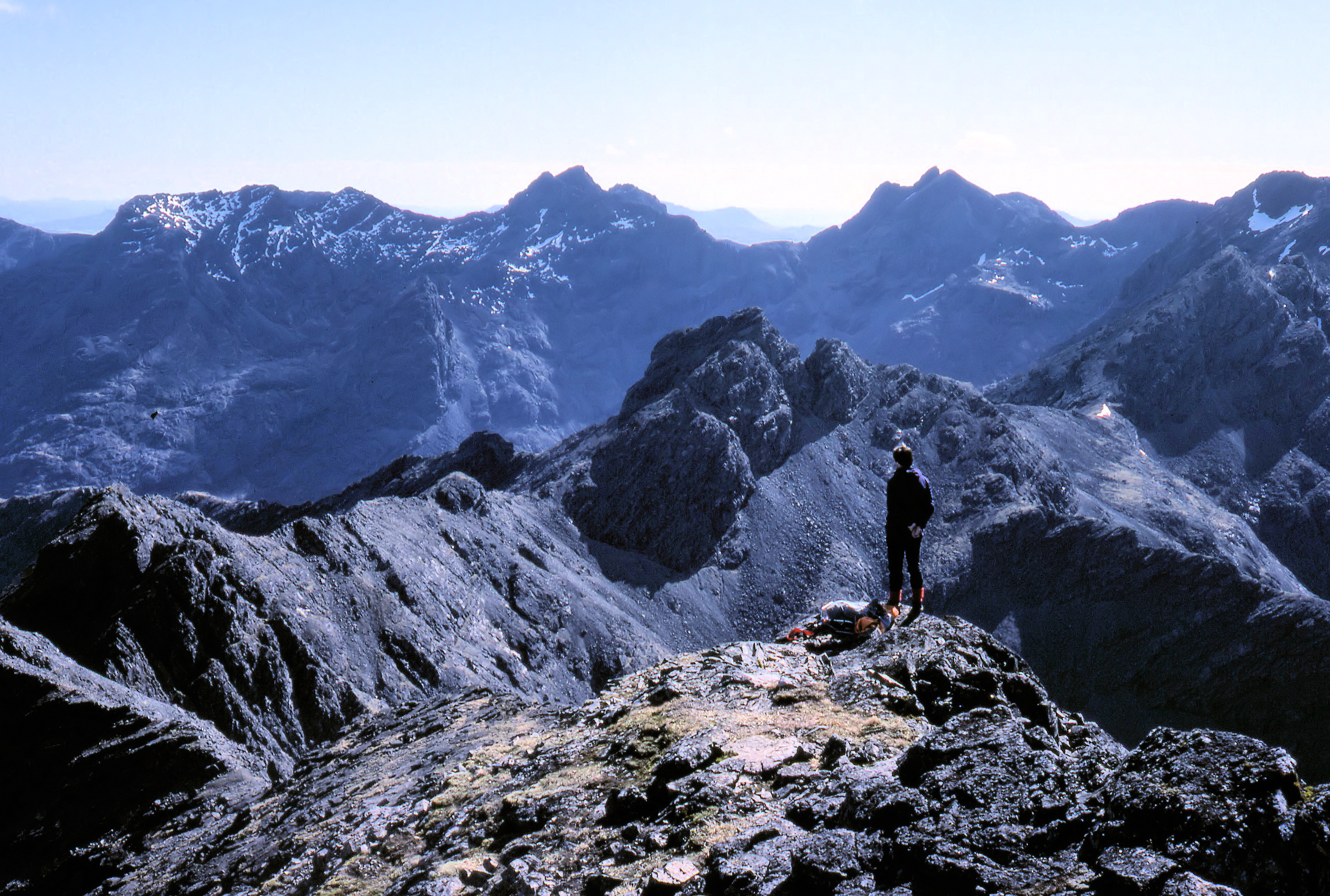
The main ridge of the Black Cuillin in Skye

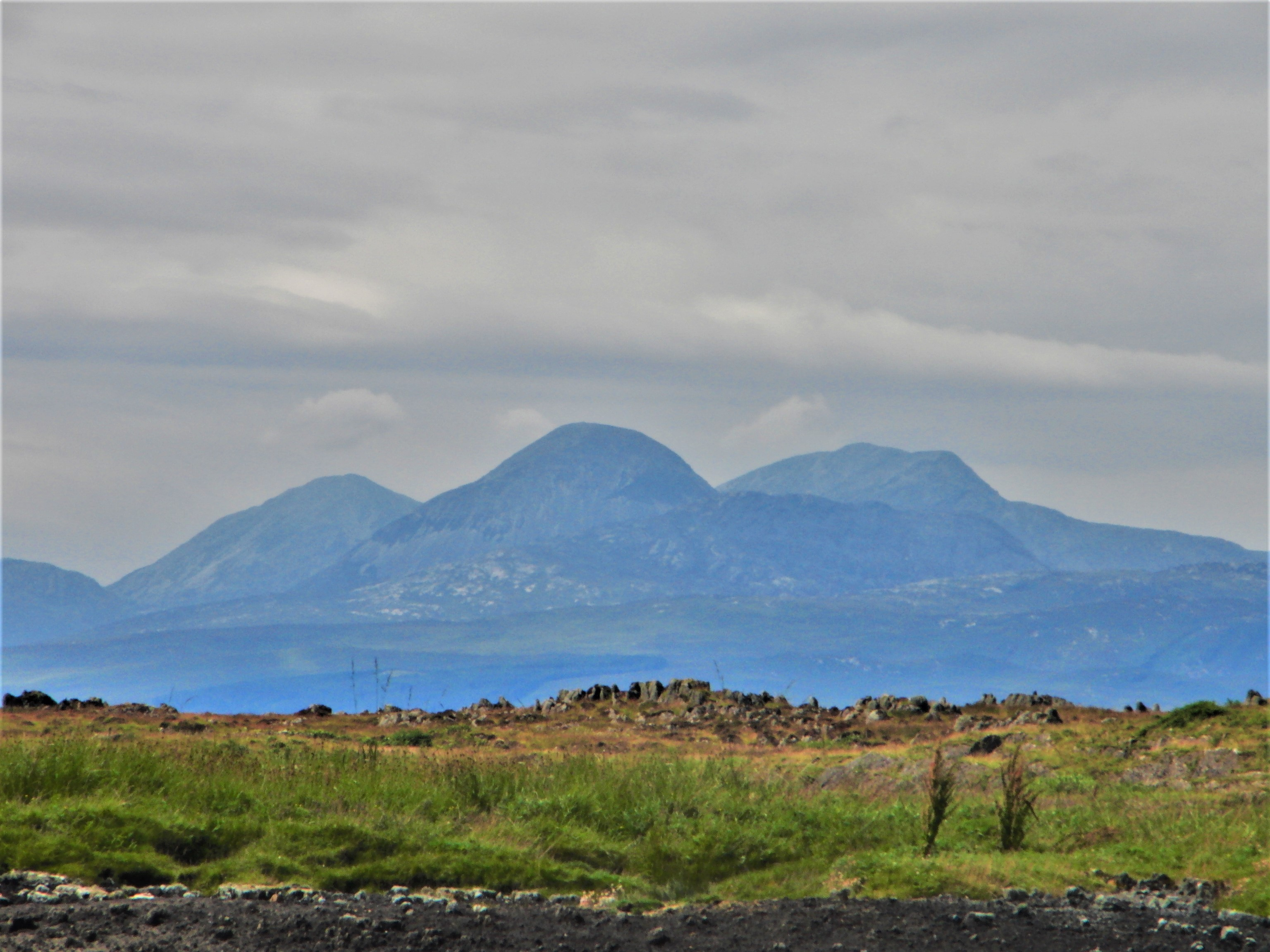
The Paps of Jura from near Keills Chapel

== Highlands ==
Scotland's main mountainous region can be broadly further split into the Northwest Highlands, the Grampian Mountains and the islands off the west coast. As the name implies, the NW Highlands begin at the suture north and west of the Great Glen and include exactly 100 of the 282 Munros. The mountains found here are generally very rough and steep, but can also often provide walking on short grass. Long ridges are to be found on both sides of Glen Shiel in Kintail and more range-like mountains are to be found further north, such as in the Fannichs. The Torridon Hills are exceptionally well-regarded by hillwalking, scrambling and climbing communities; some of them, such as Beinn Eighe, are crowned by white quartzite, which gives a highly-distinctive appearance. The trend continues to the north, with larger caps of the white rock at Foinaven and Arkle. Some of these hills are made of Lewisian Gneiss, one of the oldest rocks on Earth. Many of the peaks within this region are isolated, particularly within Assynt and Sutherland, and, although sometimes smaller, possess a great grandeur. These include: Stac Pollaidh, Suilven, An Teallach and Maiden Pap. The southern portion of this area south of Glenfinnan consists of lower mountains of Corbetts and Grahams, but maintain the rough character of those found further north. The highest mountain in this area is Càrn Eige, also the second most prominent mountain in Britain, although twelfth by height.

- Torridon, west and southwest of Kinlochewe
- The Fannichs, north-east of Kinlochewe
- Dundonnel and Fisherfield Forest, north of Kinlochewe
- Knoydart, north-east of Mallaig
- The Mullardochs and Glen Affric, west of Cannich
- Assynt, north of Ullapool

The Grampians make up the bulk of Scotland's highlands and contain the highest peaks and largest ranges, extending south and east of the Great Glen down to the Highland Boundary Fault, occupying almost half of the country's land area. Some of the area is relatively low lying, but not necessarily without topographical character. These regions include the Kintyre peninsula, Knapdale and Mid Argyll on the west coast, as well as eastern Aberdeenshire and Moray on the east. Rannoch Moor is a well-known area of low-lying land in an area surrounded by very high mountains and usually harks travellers' entrance into the highlands. The partly-forested Cowal peninsula has hills of intermediate height and considerable cragginess. The Grampians has the highest number of distinct mountain ranges in Scotland, particularly towards the west in Lochaber, where the mountains have much steeper sides than those found easterly. The highest eastern ranges can be split primarily into the Monadhliath, the Cairngorms and the Mounth. Well-known mountains and hills are to be found here, such as Ben A'an, The Cobbler, Buachaille Etive Mòr, Bidean nam Bian, Schiehallion, Ben Macdui and Lochnagar. The highest mountain in this area is Ben Nevis, the highest mountain in Britain.

- The Arrochar Alps, north-west of Arrochar
- The Braes of Balquhidder, north-west of Callander
- Breadalbane, west and north of Killin
- Lorne, north-east of Oban
- Cowal, north-west of Greenock
- The Black Mount, north-west of Bridge of Orchy
- Glen Coe, east of Ballachulish
- The Mamores, south-east of Fort William
- The Grey Corries, east of Fort William
- The Monadhliath, west of Aviemore
- The Cairngorms, north and north-west of Braemar
- The Mounth, south-east of Braemar
- Bennachie, north-west of Aberdeen

The main mountainous islands of Scotland are Skye, Mull and Rùm in the Inner Hebrides; and Harris within the Outer Hebrides, however Islay, Jura and, although separated from the Hebrides, Arran are all very well-regarded for their hills and mountains. In total there are 13 island Munros (12 on Skye and 1 on Mull). Skye's Black Cuillin, composed of basalt and rough gabbro, is generally regarded as the most serious mountain terrain in Britain with bare rock, jagged in outline and steep cliffs and deep cut corries. Ropes are required for some summits and the area is host to the only Munro necessitating climbing apparatus, the In Pinn. The neighbouring Red Cuillin is composed primarily of granite and has more isolated, cone-shaped mountains of a slightly lesser height. Skye is also very well known for the Quiraing and its Old Man of Storr on the Trotternish peninsula. The isle of Rùm has its own Cuillin, also composed of gabbro but shorter, grassier; necessitating good scrambling ability, and a head for heights. Multiple characteristic smaller hills are to be found on the island as well. Although only having one Munro, Ben More, Mull is a very mountainous island in its centre with Grahams and lower hills. The walking here is not as precipitous as the latter but still requires good competence. Jura is best known by the Paps of Jura, three cone-shaped, quartzite hills which are home to the Isle of Jura Fell Race and necessitate a great deal of height gain despite their size. Smaller hills are to be found nearby to them and on the remote northern half of the island. Within the Outer Hebrides, the mountains of Harris dominate, providing a stark contrast to the flatness of Lewis. The four highest mountains here are separated from each other by deep valleys, however the areas highest mountain, An Cliseam, can be climbed via a short horseshoe route. South Uist, further south in the archipelago, also has small enjoyable mountains and hills. The final island of considerable concern is Arran, which has four Corbetts and one Graham. These mountains require considerable care in places and include the A'Chir ridge, an area well-regarded by climbers; a number of approaches and routes are possible, usually starting from Glen Rosa or Glen Sannox. The St. Kilda archipelago, 40-miles west-northwest of North Uist, is also worth mentioning, consisting of four exceptionally steep-sided islands and multiple sea stacks, all but one requiring special planning and authorisation to visit and almost all necessitating safety ropes. These islands are sought after by hill baggers. Scotland also has smaller islands with conspicuous summits not part of a range, such as Dùn Caan on Raasay. The highest point of this area is Sgùrr Alasdair.

- The Skye Cuillin
- The Quiraing
- The Rùm Cuillin
- Isle of Mull
- Paps of Jura
- An Sgùrr (Eigg)
- St. Kilda

== Central Lowlands ==
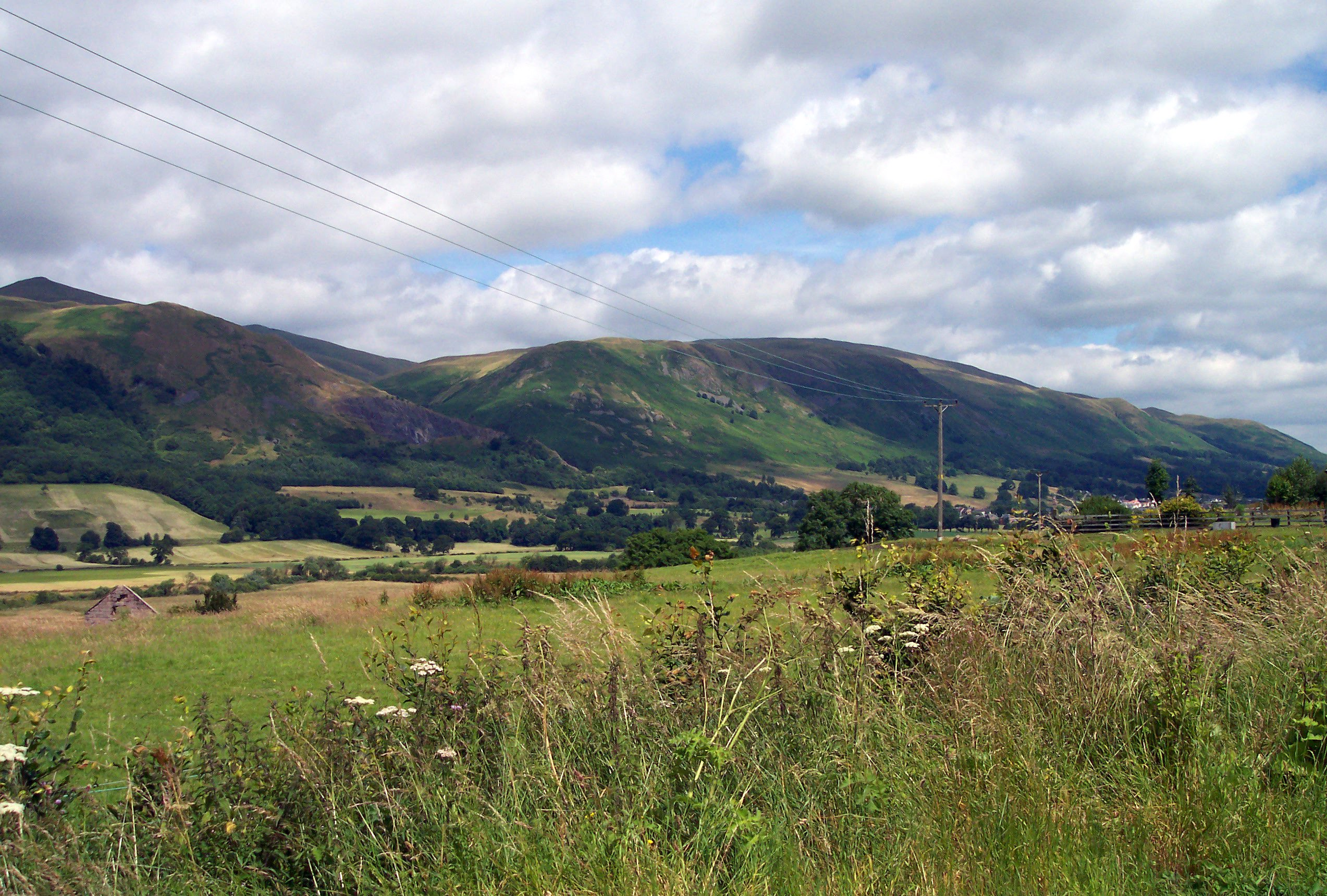
Ochil Hills (Wood Hill and Elistoun Hill) viewed from south-west of Tillicoultry

The southern and eastern parts of Scotland are usually referred to as the Scottish Lowlands, but these areas also have significant ranges of hills, although these are lower than the Highland mountains. Because they are much closer to towns and cities, they are more popular for hill walking and rambling than the more distant mountains of the Highlands. The highest mountain in this area is Ben Cleuch.

- Sidlaw Hills, north of Dundee but south east of the Highland Boundary Fault
- Ochil Hills, east of Stirling
- Kilpatrick Hills, north-west of Glasgow
- Campsie Fells, north of Glasgow
- Lomond Hills, east of Kinross

In addition to the main ranges, there are numerous individual hills in the Lowlands, often volcanic in origin. Many are known by the Scots word Law, meaning hill.

== Southern Uplands ==
The Southern Uplands form a continuous belt of hills across southern Scotland from Dumfries and Galloway to the Scottish Borders, with the northern sections spilling into Ayrshire, South Lanarkshire and Lothian. These uplands are divided into several local ranges. The heartland of the Galloway Hills lies to the north of Loch Trool, and excellent walks start from the extensive car park by Bruce's Stane. The ranges within the Scottish Borders are somewhat bigger and flatter than in Galloway but are of a similar height and are just as remote. There are also isolated hills which do not fit into any specific range, such as Tinto and Cairnsmore of Fleet. The highest mountain in this area is Merrick.

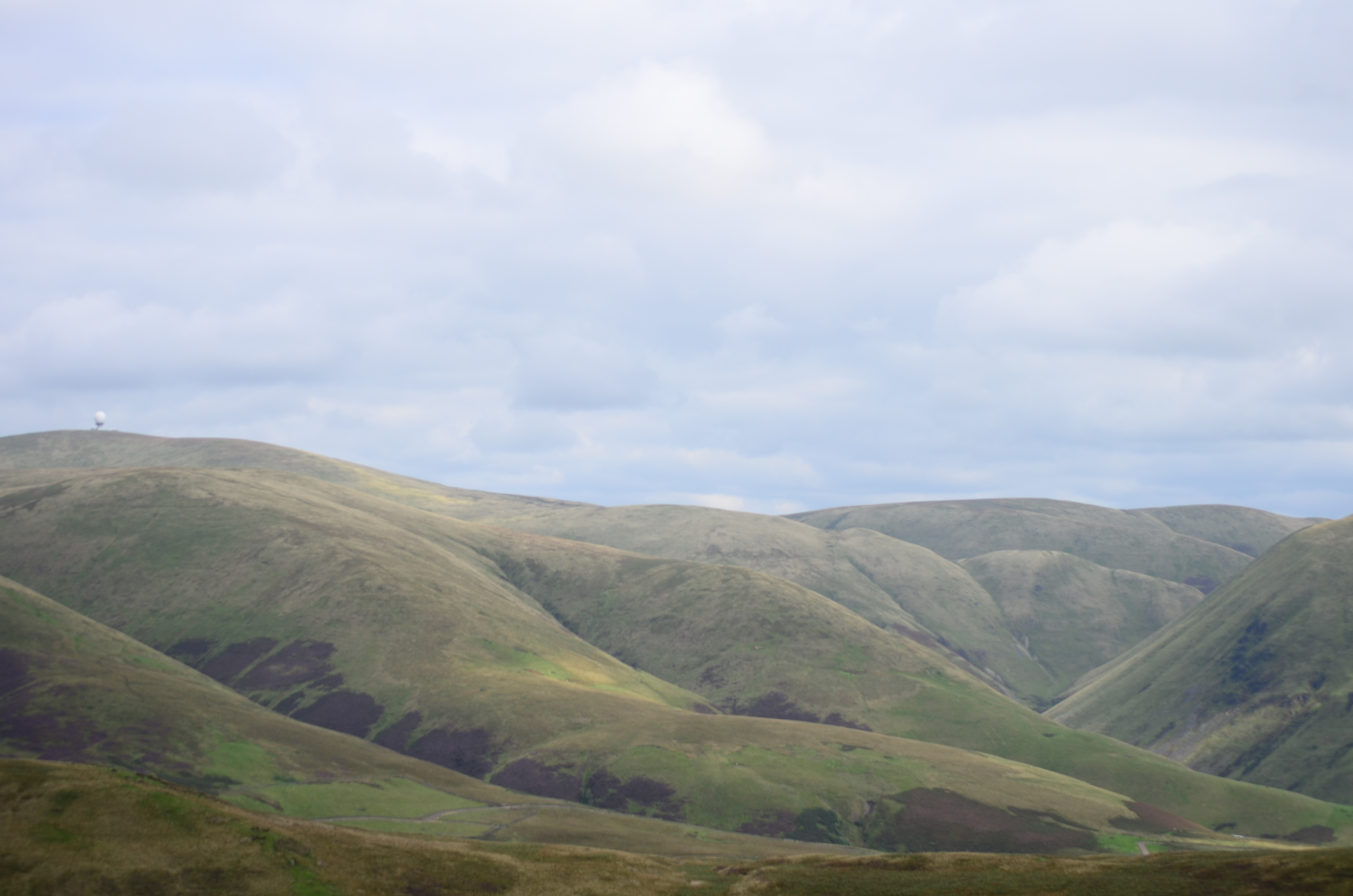
Lowther Hill from the south

- Galloway Hills
  - Range of the Awful Hand
  - Dungeon Hills
  - Rhinns of Kells
  - Minnigaff Hills
- Carsphairn and Scaur Hills
- Lowther Hills
- Moffat Hills
- Pentland Hills
- Moorfoot Hills
- Manor Hills
- Lammermuir Hills
- Ettrick Hills
- Cheviot Hills, which lie mostly in England and form part of the border between the two countries

== Scotland's highest mountains ==
The ten highest mountains in Scotland are also the ten highest in the UK:

1. Ben Nevis (Beinn Nibheis), 4,411.18 ft (1,344.527 m)

2. Ben Macdui (Beinn Macduibh), 4,296 ft (1,309.3 m)

3. Braeriach (Am Bràigh Riabhach), 4,252 ft (1,296 m)

4. Cairn Toul (Càrn an t-Sabhail), 4,236 ft (1,291 m)

5. Sgòr an Lochain Uaine, 4,127 ft (1,258 m)

6. Cairn Gorm (An Càrn Gorm), 4,084 ft (1,244.8 m)

7. Aonach Beag, 4,049 ft (1,234 m)

8. Aonach Mòr, 4,004 ft (1,220.4 m)

9. Càrn Mòr Dearg, 4,003 ft (1,220 m)

10. Ben Lawers (Beinn Labhair), 3,984 ft (1,214.3 m)

== Listings ==
Scottish peaks are categorised in the following hill lists. A peak may qualify for inclusion in more than one list.

- The Munros are the most significant hills in Scotland over 3,000 feet (914.4 m), according to original compiler Sir Hugh Munro. The list was first drawn up in 1891, and is modified from time to time by the Scottish Mountaineering Club (SMC). It currently comprises 282 peaks, following the demotion of Sgurr nan Ceannaichean in September 2009 and of Beinn a' Chlaidheimh in 2012.
- The Corbetts are hills in Scotland between 2,500 and 3,000 feet (762 and 914.4 m), with a relative height of at least 500 feet (152.4 m). The list is maintained by the SMC. There are currently 222 hills.
- The Grahams are hills in Scotland between 2,000 and 2,500 feet (609.6 and 762 m), with a relative height of at least 150 metres (492 ft). The list of hills fitting these criteria was first published by Alan Dawson in The Relative Hills of Britain. under the provisional name Elsies (LCs, short for Lesser Corbetts). They were later named Grahams after the late Fiona Torbet (née Graham) who had compiled a similar list around the same time. The SMC incorporated the list into Munro's Tables in 1997 but Dawson continues to maintain the list. There were originally 224 Grahams, but the current total stands at 221 after Corwharn, Ben Aslak and Ladylea Hill were surveyed as falling short of 609.6 m
- The Donalds are hills in the Scottish Lowlands over 2,000 feet (609.6 m). The list was originally compiled by Percy Donald, and is maintained by the SMC. It comprises 89 summits and 51 subsidiary tops, giving a total of 140 hills.
- The Marilyns are hills in the British Isles that have a prominence of at least 150 m, regardless of distance, absolute height or merit. The list was compiled and is maintained by Alan Dawson. There are 1,216 Scottish Marilyns, see List of Marilyns in Scotland.

== Injuries and deaths ==
It has been commented that "Avalanches during the winter are usually the primary cause of death in the Scottish mountains." In 2023 it was reported that seven people had died in accidents on the Aonach Eagach ridge since 2014.

Injuries and deaths from avalanches

Time Period	Location	Died	Total injured
1970	Ben Nevis	3	
1994	Buachaille Etive Mor	1	
1995	Buachaille Etive Mor	3	
1998	Ben Nevis	4	
2009	Buachaille Etive Mor	3	1
2009	Ben Nevis	2	
2013	Bidean nam Bian	4	1
2016	Ben Nevis	2	
2016	Creag Meagaidh	1	1
2019	Ben Nevis	3	1
2022	Ben Nevis	1	1

== See also ==
- Ben Nevis
- Buachaille Etive Mòr
- Caledonian orogeny
- Geography of Scotland
- Geology of Scotland
- List of mountains of the British Isles by height
- Lists of mountains and hills in the British Isles
- Lists of mountains in Ireland
- List of Munro mountains in Scotland
- List of Murdos (mountains)
- List of Corbetts (mountains)
- List of Grahams (mountains)
- List of Donald mountains in Scotland
- List of Furth mountains in the British Isles
- List of P600 mountains in the British Isles

== Bibliography ==
- Poucher, W.A. (1998). The Scottish Peaks. London: Frances Lincoln Ltd. ISBN 0-7112-2406-4.
