= Galloway Hills =

Region of the Southern Uplands of Scotland

Coordinates: 55.12°N 4.41°W

The Galloway Hills are part of the Southern Uplands of Scotland, and form the northern boundary of western Galloway. They lie within the bounds of the Galloway Forest Park, an area of some 300 square miles (800 km^{2}) of largely uninhabited wild land, managed by Forestry and Land Scotland. The unusual place names reflect a mixture of the Old Norse and Scottish Gaelic languages and hint at the range of influences which have acted on society within the area over the centuries.

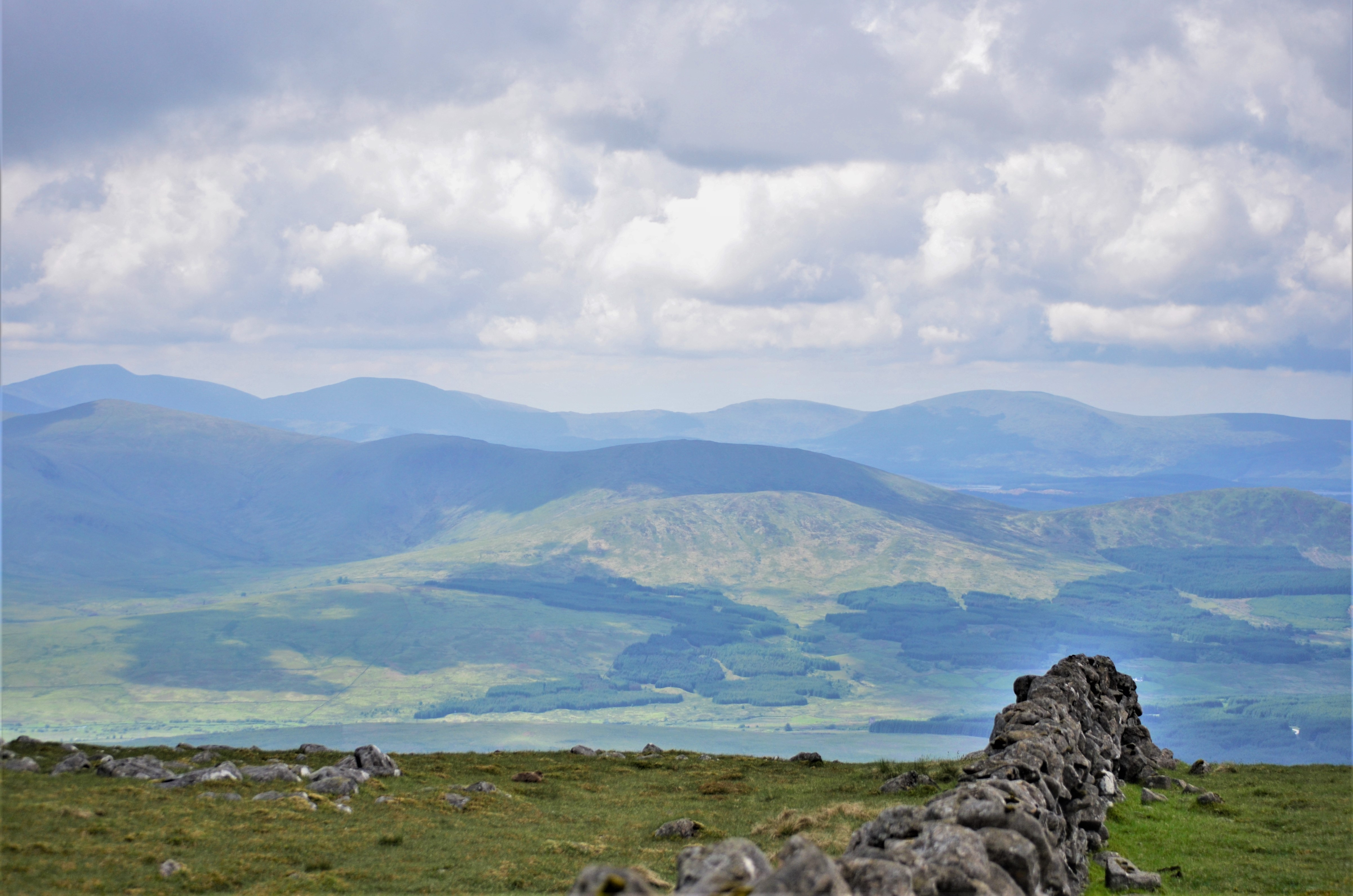
Portions of the Rhinns of Kells and Range of the Awful Hand from Cairnsmore of Carsphairn.

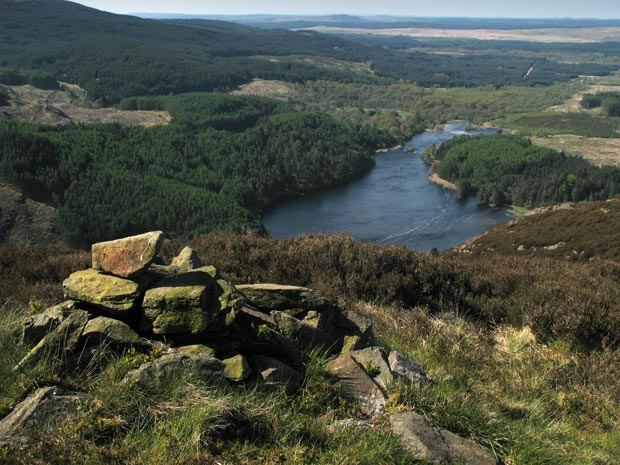
Looking south west from Buchan Hill down Loch Trool.

== Location ==
The location of Galloway has been described as follows, "Galloway is contained by sea to the west (North Channel) and south (Solway Firth), the "Galloway Hills" to the north, and the River Nith to the east". So if we were to say "The hills of Galloway" we would be including all the hills within this area; but as the first sentence implies, the "Galloway Hills" is usually taken to mean a collection of ranges which lie mainly south of Loch Doon and which are not constrained by political boundaries. The boundary between Dumfries and Galloway Region and Ayrshire runs west to east over Kirriereoch hill, drops south of Mullwharchar to the shores of Loch Enoch, before heading northwards up the east shore of Loch Doon, and so runs more or less through what might well be considered the heart of the Galloway hills – around Loch Enoch.

=== Northern and western boundaries ===
The northern limit of this hill area is around the small towns of Dalmellington and Straiton, both in Ayrshire. The B741 runs on an east–west line between these two towns on its way to the town of Girvan on the Firth of Clyde. The B741 could therefore be taken as the northern limit of the Galloway Hills area.

From Straiton a minor road runs south by Stinchar Bridge through the northwest corner of these hills to meet another minor road which runs from Glentrool village northwards towards Girvan and Maybole. This latter road forms the western boundary of the Galloway Hills. It follows the valley of Water of Minnoch and for most of its length it passes through the extensive forestry plantations which lie to the west of the hills.

=== Eastern boundary ===
The A713 (Castle Douglas to Ayr road) forms the eastern boundary of these hills. As it heads south from Dalmellington it passes through the valley known as the Glenkens which separates the Galloway Hills from the Carsphairn and Scaur Hills to the east. There is an extensive hydro-electric scheme (commissioned 1935/36) with several dams and power stations that runs down through the Glenkens to end at Tongland Power Station near Kirkcudbright.

The A713 passes through Carsphairn on the Water of Deuch and St John's Town of Dalry on Water of Ken and also close to New Galloway at Kenbridge, at the northern end of Loch Ken. From New Galloway the A712 passes through the hills to Newton Stewart. This road passes Clatteringshaws Reservoir, the Queen's Way, Dunkitterick Cottage (the birthplace of Alexander Murray), a deer range, a wild goat park and Murray's Monument.

=== Southern boundary ===
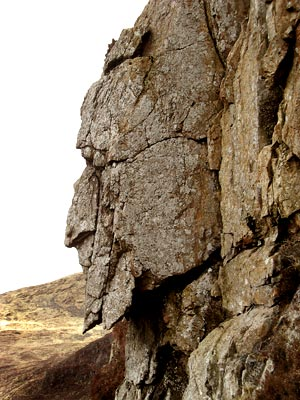
Grey Man of the Merrick.

For most users of these hills, "the Galloway Hills" would mean the ranges which lie north of a line running eastwards along the north shores of Loch Trool, Loch Dee and Clatteringshaws Reservoir. This for them would be the notional true heartland of the Galloway Hills. The Southern Upland Way and the National Cycle Network Route Number Seven travel along this line. A slightly looser use of the phrase Galloway Hills would include the ranges which lie to the south of that line.

=== Outlying ranges to the south ===
To the south of the A712, east of Clatteringshaws Reservoir is a hill called Cairnsmore of Dee or Black Craig of Dee (493 metres) which offers excellent views from the top over Clatteringshaws into the heart of the Galloway Hills. To the south of Murray's Monument is a range of hills around Cairnsmore of Fleet. The top of Cairnsmore of Fleet is over 2 km in length running almost north–south and it has tops at either end. To the south of this again is a group of small coastal hills around Cairnharrow just to the west of Gatehouse of Fleet. Immediately beyond that is the A75 road running close to the shore of the Solway Firth.

== Hills named Cairnsmore ==
Besides the two Cairnsmore Hills just mentioned there is a third "Cairnsmore" acting as a prominent sentinel around the borders of the Galloway hills. This is Cairnsmore of Carsphairn which lies some 5 km to the north east of Carsphairn and is the prominent hill to the east of the Rhinns of Kells ridge.

== Access roads ==
- Some 2 km south of Dalmellington on the A713 s a forestry toll road which leads down the west side of Loch Doon, passing the reconstructed Loch Doon Castle and emerging at Stinchar Bridge, passing close to Loch Riecawr and Loch Bradan. The Barr to Loch Doon Cycle Route uses this forest road.
- From Glentrool village there is a minor single track road that foes eastward to Bruce's Stone on the northern side of Loch Trool, a distance of some 6 km. The road stops here for vehicle traffic but the N7 National Cycle Network Route carries on from there over to Clatteringshaws.
- Cars can be taken as far as Craigencallie (Ordnance Survey ref. NX503780) which lies about halfway between Loch Dee and Clatteringshaws. Access to the single track road there is just west of the dam at Clatteringshaws Reservoir on the A712.

== Three ridges ==
The heartland of the Galloway Hills lies to the north of Loch Trool, and many walks in the area start near Bruce's Stone. There are three ridges which run northwards from the Loch Trool/Loch Dee/Clatteringshaws area: the Awful Hand on the west, the Rhinns of Kells to the east, and the Dungeon Hills in between.

=== Range of the Awful Hand ===
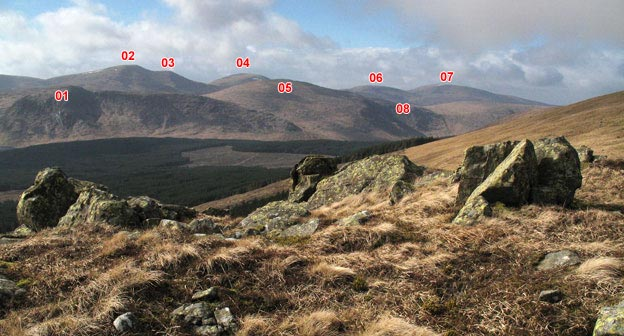
Dungeon Hills and Awful Hand from the Saddle between Millfire and Corserine in the Rhinns of Kells. 01 Dungeon Hill – 02 Merrick – 03 Little Spear of Merrick – 04 Kirriereoch – 05 Mullwharchar – 06 Tarfessock – 07 Shalloch on Minnoch – 08 Hoodens Hill.

Taking the 'Awful Hand' from north to south are the following tops Shalloch on Minnoch, Tarfessock, Kirriereoch Hill, Merrick and Benyellary. Merrick is the highest hill in the south of Scotland though at less than 3000 feet it is not a Munro. These five hills have ridges running off them to the west making the hand shape, Benyellary being the thumb. This hand is best seen from near Waterhead on Minnoch as you head south from Stinchar Bridge towards Glentrool village. The Awful Hand ridge is 9 km in length as the crow flies; from the top of Shalloch on Minnoch to the top of Benyellary. Although sounding quite short, there are some stiff climbs along the route, especially around Kirriereoch Hill and the Merrick. Walkers also have at least a 3 km walk in to the two terminal tops from any road.

=== Rhinns of Kells ===
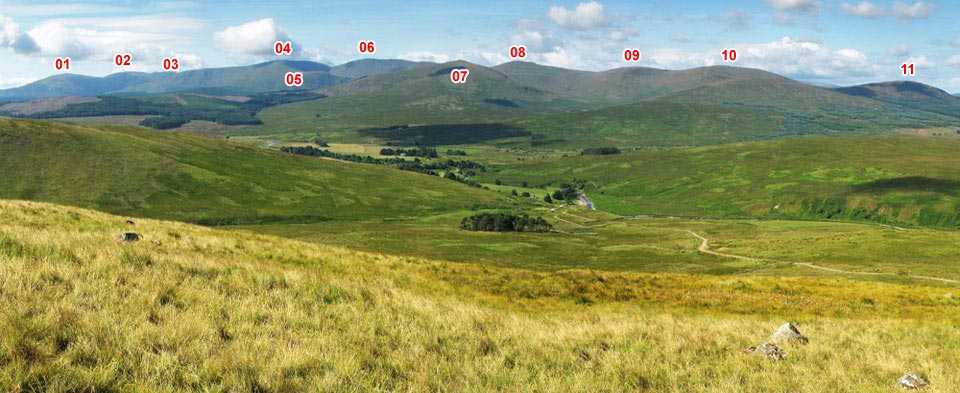
Rhinns of Kells Range from Cairnsmore of Carsphairn Hills 01 Meikle Millyea – 02 Milldown – 03 Millfire – 04 Corserine – 05 Craigrine – 06 Carlin's Cairn – 07 Cairnsgarroch – 08 Meaul – 09 Bow – 10 Coran of Portmark – 11 Black Craig.

Taking the Rhinns of Kells from north to south we start on Black Craig on the east bank of Loch Doon, followed by Coran of Portmark, Meaul, Carlin's Cairn, Corserine, Millfire, Milldown, Meikle Millyea, Little Millyea and Darrou. Darrou lies about halfway between Loch Dee and Clatteringshaws. The Rhinns of Kells is 15.5 km as the crow flies from Black Craig to Darrou and the ridge has a double curve on it making it somewhat longer than that. It tends to be a gently undulating ridge along its length, making for relatively easy walking.

=== Dungeon Hills ===
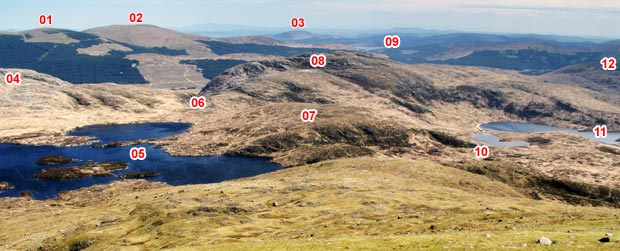
Lochs Enoch, Arron and Neldricken, the Dungeon hills and the Rhinns of Kells from Merrick. 01 Milldown – 02 Meikle Millyea – 03 Cairnsmore of Dee – 04 Dungeon Hill – 05 Loch Enoch – 06 Nick of the Dungeon – 07 Craig Neldricken – 08 Craignaw – 09 Clatteringshaws Reservoir – 10 Loch Arron – 11 Loch Neldricken – 12 Craiglee

Taking the Dungeon Hills from north to south, Craigmawhannal is just south of the south end of Loch Doon, followed by, Hoodens Hill, Mullwharchar, Dungeon Hill, Craignairny, Craignaw, Snibe Hill and Craiglee. Craiglee is to an extent an outlier from the main ridge lying as it does at the eastern end of the Rig of the Jarkness which runs east to west. Craiglee is just north of Loch Dee. The 'Dungeons' are 11 km from the top of Craigmawhannal to the top of Craiglee as the crow flies. None of these hills get to the same heights as some hills on the other two ridges. However, apart from Mullwharchar they are much more rocky and rugged and are therefore popular with climbers and scramblers.

A planning application was made in January 1978 to Kyle and Carrick District Council by the UKAEA to test drill on Mullwharchar for the purpose of dumping nuclear waste. On 24 October 1978, the Council rejected the application after considerable local protest.

== Between the ridges ==
There is relatively low ground between the Dungeons ridge and the other two ridges on either side of it and this lower ground passes through the whole hill area from north to south forming two corridors through the hills.

However, the surface of the highest loch in the corridor to the west of the Dungeons, Loch Enoch, is actually around 490 metres above sea level. With Loch Trool being about 70 m above sea level, this corridor rises significantly as it passes for about 5 km between the hills on either side.

The surface of Dry Loch of the Dungeon, the highest loch to the east of the Dungeons is around 330 metres above sea level and most of the Silver Flowe immediately to the south of it lies fairly level at about the 270 metres mark all the way back south to Loch Dee (around 225 metres above sea level). The explanation for this is that the Silver Flowe is a floating or blanket bog and is consequently flat in nature.

=== Lochs between the Awful Hand and the Dungeons ===
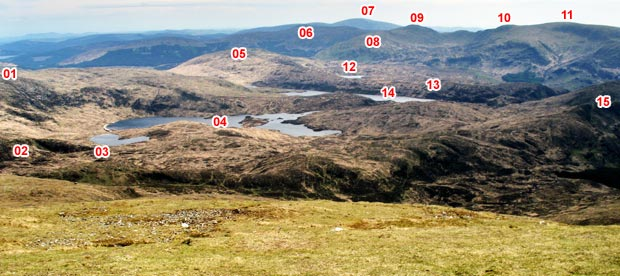
View over Lochs Arron, Neldricken and Valley to Minnigaff Hills 01 Craignaw – 02 Craig Neldricken – 03 Loch Arron – 04 Loch Neldricken – 05 Craiglee – 06 Millfore – 07 Cairnsmore of Fleet – 08 White Hill – 09 Curleywee – 10 Bennanbrack – 11 Lamachan – 12 Glenhead Lochs – 13 Rig of the Jarkness – 14 Loch Valley – 15 Buchan Ridge.

There are two burns which feed into the eastern end of Loch Trool on its northern shore, the Buchan Burn (the more westerly) and the Gairland Burn, separated by a 3 km long ridge which runs north from Buchan Hill just north of Loch Trool to Craig Neldricken immediately south of Loch Enoch – the Buchan Ridge.

It is quite possible to use the Buchan Burn route to get to Loch Enoch, passing the Grey Man of the Merrick, on the left before Loch Enoch (OS ref. NX427842). The more popular route however, because of the scenic interest, is the Gairland Burn path which passes Loch Valley, Loch Neldricken and Loch Arron before reaching Loch Enoch. This is often called the "Loch's Route onto The Merrick" – though involves a 350-metre climb up Redstone Rig from Loch Enoch to the Merrick.

On the west side of Loch Neldricken is "Murder Hole", which name refers to an incident in Samuel Crockett's novel "The Raiders" – though it is claimed that the real murder hole is near Rowantree Bridge (OS Ref NX354907) on the Water of Minnoch where the bodies of waylaid, murdered travellers were dumped.

East of Loch Neldricken, access to Loch Enoch is gained by the Wolf Slock. Both of these latter named places figure prominently in the Crockett novel. The sharp granite sand on the beaches of Loch Enoch itself was at one time collected and sold for sharpening knives and scythes.

In McBain's book "The Merrick and Neighbouring Hills" there is a description of how McBain tried to find the depth of Loch Enoch by cutting a series of holes on its icy surface and dropping a weighted line into it – quite alone when he did so. He worked out a depth of 105 feet at what he reckoned was the deepest point. McBain was an intrepid hill walker/climber who was much devoted to these hills and his book exudes his love for the wild places.

=== Silver Flowe ===
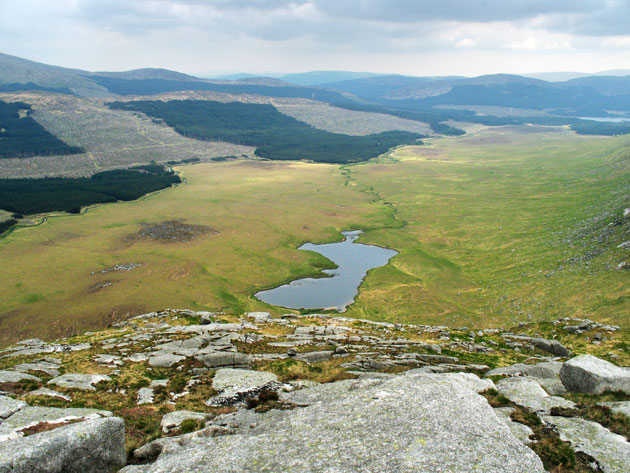
Silver Flowe from Dungeon Hill. Backhill of Bush is behind the trees on the left edge of the picture. The loch in the foreground is Long Loch of the Dungeon and the loch in the distance by the right edge of the picture is Loch Dee. Meikle Millyea is on the left edge leading down to Little Millyea and Darrou as the Rhinns of Kells ridge descends into the gap between Loch Dee and Clatteringshaws.

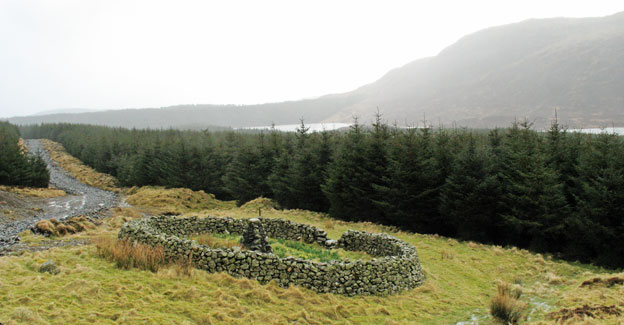
Ralph Furlow Monument with Loch Dungeon and Meikle Millyea.

The Silver Flowe is a national nature reserve with a Blanket bog of international importance. It is part of the Merrick Kells Biosphere Reserve and is a Ramsar site for the quality of its peatlands and wetlands. The reserve is owned by Forest Enterprise but is managed through a lease by Scottish Natural Heritage.

=== Backhill of Bush ===
Today Backhill of Bush is open as a bothy, having been renovated after a period of closure due to vandalism. Until around 1950 it was still in use as the home of a shepherd (or "Hird" in local parlance) working a part of the land known as the Dungeon of Buchan and was reckoned to be the loneliest such outpost in Galloway with the Silver Flowe to the west and the Rhinns of Kells to the east.

Soon after this the land was taken over by the Forestry Commission and the sheep grazings became dense forest, but not before the death of a 17-year-old shepherd called Ralph Furlow, an employee of the Department of Agriculture, whose job it was to cross the Rhinns of Kells to tend to the sheep still in the Dungeon area. On 27 January 1954 he was overwhelmed in a snow storm and his death is commemorated by a monument just below Millfire on its east side.

=== Access into the heart of the Galloway Hills from the East and West ===
The route Ralph Furlow would have used to cross the Rhinns was that used by the former residents of Back Hill – going over the saddle between Corserine and Millfire (OS. Ref NX516863). In earlier times a funeral party taking a "hird's" wife's dead body over the Rhinns was caught in a snowstorm in this saddle and the body had to be left there for several days. Heading west from Back Hill for the Loch Enoch area the route taken was up the Nick of the Dungeon, a steep boulder-strewn climb west of the watery pools of the Silver Flowe.

== Habitation in the Galloway Hills ==
There are the remains of several other former buildings scattered around the Galloway hills area; notably at Glenhead (NX433800) close to the Southern Upland Way for example, and at Culsharg (NX416822) on the "tourist route" from Bruce's Stone to the Merrick. The latter can still be used as something of a shelter in bad weather, though it is far from MBA bothy standard. Buildings still in use are to be found around the periphery of the Galloway hills heartland but apart from forest tracks, there are neither public roads nor buildings in use in the heartland itself.

== Minnigaff Hills ==
The Minnigaff Hills lie just south of the east end of Loch Trool and they stretch to the shores of Clatteringshaws Reservoir. Their southern boundary is the A712 New Galloway to Newton Stewart road.

The battle which Bruce's Stone commemorates was actually fought (in 1307) at the south east end of Loch Trool where Muldonnoch falls steeply into it. South east of Muldonnoch is Lamachan Hill, the south west ridge of which leads to Larg Hill (676 metres) whilst another runs east over Bennanbrack to Curleywee. White Hill is 1.5 km north of Curleywee whilst its 3.5 km long southern ridge drop to the top of Black Benwee.

Some 2 km east of Loch Dee a ridge of hills runs from just south of Darrou in a south westerly direction; these hills are really a continuation of the line of the Rhinns of Kells. From north to south the hills are Cairngarroch, Cairnbaber, Millfore and Drigmorn Hill.

There is also a small range of hills just to the west of Clatteringshaws Reservoir. On Darnaw, the highest of these hills, there is a monument to those who died here in an air crash on 2 February 1937.

== Air crash sites ==
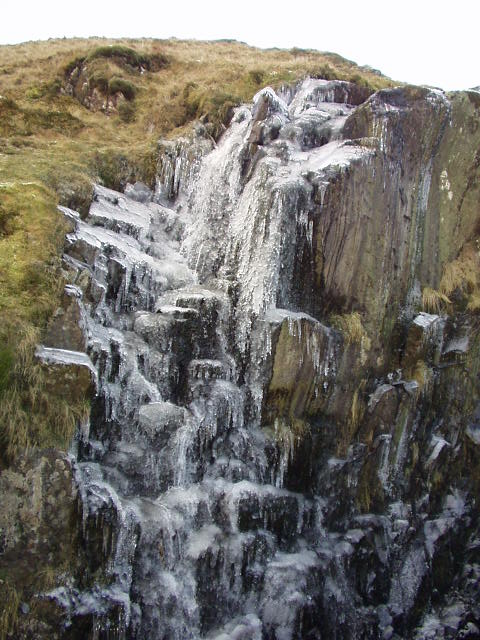
A frozen waterfall in the Galloway Hills.

Besides the air crash site just mentioned on Darnaw there are many more crash sites (some with monuments) in the Galloway hills area. There is a monument on Cairnsmore of Fleet which lists 9 aircraft which have crashed there. There is a monument on Craignaw to the pilots of an F-111 which crashed there on 19 December 1979. During World War II, Dumfries and several other places in south west Scotland were heavily involved in the training of pilots etc. for the war effort and many of the crash sites date from this era.

== Galloway Forest Park ==
The whole area of hills falls within Galloway Forest Park, an area of 300 square miles (800 km^{2}) of mixed landscape with three visitors' centres and offering many recreational facilities. On 15 November 2009, the park became the first Dark Sky Park in the United Kingdom.

== Galloway Hills in Scottish history ==
Like the Western Isles and the Northern Isles, Galloway had a long history under the Lords of Galloway (from the early 12th century until 1234) of being largely independent of the Scottish crown. Going back beyond that there is thought to have been a kingdom of Galloway perhaps going back to the aftermath of the expulsion of the Vikings from Dublin in 902 and the subsequent loss of control by the former Northumbrian masters of Galloway. Galloway was long regarded as a wild and lawless place – somewhat other from the mainstream of Scottish culture, which was as much as anything to do with its remoteness and inaccessibility. The Galloway hills played an important part in this image especially as at various points in history it was a place of refuge for fugitives who did not fit into, or defied, the power structure of their times.

=== "Cradle of Independence" – A king as a fugitive ===
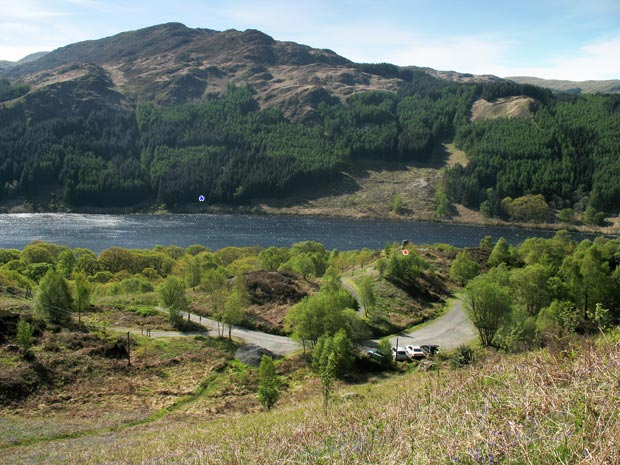
View from Eschoncan over part of the car park at Bruce's Stone Glentrool to the scene of the Battle of Glentrool (1307) at Steps of Trool (marked with a blue asterisk) on the far side of Loch Trool with Mulldonoch beyond. Bruce's Stone can be seen right of centre in the foreground (small red asterisk below it)

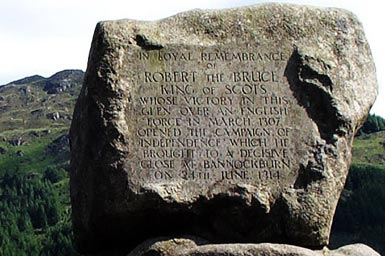
Bruce's Stone Glentrool.

Robert the Bruce was crowned King of Scotland on 25 March 1306 little more than a month after he had been involved at Dumfries in the murder of John III Comyn, Lord of Badenoch, otherwise known as the Red Comyn, (a serious rival for the kingship of Scotland, as his mother was Eleanor Balliol who was the eldest daughter of John I de Balliol) . Another branch of the Comyn family at his time was that of John Comyn Earl of Buchan. His father Alexander had been Sheriff of Wigtown (1263–1266) and a Guardian of Scotland (1286–89), and they held land in the south west of Scotland before being granted the lands in Buchan – which explains why there are place names with Buchan in them in the Galloway hills area like Buchan Hill and Dungeon of Buchan.

Bruce's army lost to Edward I's forces at the Battle of Methven in June 1306 and he became a fugitive hunted not only by the occupying forces of Edward but also by the Comyns and the Balliols. He escaped to Rathlin Island off the Irish coast but by February 1307 he was back in Scotland, in the Galloway hills, with a tiny handful of followers and totally encircled by his enemies – a king hunted like an animal. However, following a successful early raid on the English forces at Raploch Moss near Clatteringshaws, he had his first victory against the English forces at the battle of Glen Trool. Though this was probably more of a minor skirmish in the guerrilla mode of William Wallace, it was important from a propaganda point of view in the recruitment of men to Bruce's cause.

In 1929 on the 600th anniversary of Bruce's death, Bruce's Stone was placed high above the northern shore of Loch Trool from where legend has it that he had commanded the ambush which took place on the Steps of Trool on the other side of the loch. He lived for some 3 months as a fugitive in these hills before he was able to break out of his confinement and go on eventually to the much more significant victory at Bannockburn in 1314 which gave Scotland some relief in the first War of Independence and the near subjugation to the English Crown which had ensued after the death of King Alexander III on 19 March 1286.

Robert the Bruce's brother Edward who was later to become High King of Ireland had long since carried out a successful campaign against the Comyn/Balliol faction in the south west of Scotland before Bannockburn.

=== Covenanting fugitives ===
Through most of the 17th century the Presbyterian Church in Scotland struggled against the will of the Stewart Kings in their attempts to impose Anglican and even (with James II) Catholic practices in the Scottish Church. The Presbyterian Church claimed that every man was equal in the eyes of God, could read and understand the Bible for himself and therefore needed no hierarchical form of priesthood, especially one which was appointed under the patronage of the most powerful people in the land, to act between them and their God. The covenanters believed that the reformation settlement in England had simply replaced the power of the Pope over the church with the power of the king over it and they would not have their religious freedom laid down for them by the crown.

In some ways their principles were political harbingers on the path towards later principles of democratic forms of government and were seen at the time as dangerous sedition by kings who still believed in the Divine right of kings. The National Covenant was drawn up in 1638 and it is from this that the Covenanters take their name – with reference beyond that to the Covenants of the Bible.The South West of Scotland was a particular hot bed of resistance to the will of the kings in religious matters and over time both sides in this conflict went to extreme ends to have their way.

=== Killing Times ===
The full weight of the state was brought against the fanatical religious idealism of the Covenanters; most of whom were ordinary people. Over a protracted period of time they were hunted in the hills of Galloway much as Bruce had been and were prepared to risk summary and brutal execution for their beliefs if caught. Those suffering this fate were seen by their fellows as martyrs for the cause. Like the Bruce they were idealistic fugitives in the Galloway hills fighting for what they believed in and there were several battles between the covenanters and the crown forces in various parts of Scotland.

In their case however their struggles to survive in these hills and practice their beliefs there through conventicles are counted in years rather than months. Eighty two persons were summarily killed by the troops during the Killing Time (1684–85). Since these are only the ones which were witnessed and recorded the numbers could be much more. "All over the more desolate parts the Covenanters were being massacred by the soldiers and their bodies left to rot on the heather where they fell. No records were kept of such killings; the victims were simply regarded as 'missing' for none of their relatives or friends knew how or where they had died. For many years after the killing times shepherds were continually finding on hills and moors the bleached skeletons of covenanters who had been killed in this way". The matter was not resolved until after the Glorious Revolution of 1688 when under William of Orange presbyterianism was finally established as the faith of most Scots and the Presbyterian Church of Scotland was accepted by the authorities as the established church although, though even he, a fellow Calvinist, found the more fanatical Presbyterians hard to handle.

In the 18th century the stonemason Robert Paterson devoted his life to going round the country restoring the monuments of the covenanting martyrs and Walter Scott used this real life character as the model for "Old Mortality". The Galloway author S.R.Crockett wrote several covenanting novels set around the Galloway Hills, including The Men of the Moss Hags, and Silver Sand.

=== Smugglers and gypsies ===
The 18th century was the heyday of smuggling along the Solway coast – sitting as it does only around 20 miles (30 km) from the Isle of Man, the pathway for most contraband goods. The Galloway hills offered a refuge for these far from idealistic lawless rogues and ruffians – somewhere to retreat to in times of trouble and as a safe route for the strings of up to 200 laden horses which carried their goods to Glasgow or Edinburgh. "During the early 18th century Galloway was infested with gypsies, and it was no accident that Sir Walter Scott should have introduced Meg Merrilies and her tribe into his novel 'Guy Mannering' which is set in the Stewartry." Gypsy or "Tinkler" clans were heavily involved in the trafficking side of smuggling – getting the contraband to its market. The most notorious of these gypsy smugglers was Billy Marshall (King of the Gypsies) who is said to have fought at the Battle of the Boyne in 1690 at the age of 18 and died on 28 November 1792 – 120 years old and having married 17 times. He was also one of the leaders of the Levellers (not to be confused with the Levellers in England). The actions of the Galloway Levellers have been described as the "most significant agrarian rebellion" in 18th century Scotland. They knocked down dykes during the night as quickly as enclosing landlords built them during the day. The Galloway author S.R.Crockett uses the Levellers Rebellion as a sub-plot in his novel The Dark o' the Moon, which is set in the Galloway Hills, especially around the Dungeon Range. Crockett wrote several other stories of Galloway smugglers and gypsies

Another story from west Galloway which helped to give an extra edge to the picture of lawlessness in the area was the legend of the extensive cannibal family of Sawney Bean.

Scotland's National Bard Robert Burns was an excise man in eastern Galloway at the time of his death in 1796.

== See also ==
- Southern Upland Way
