= Dungeon Hills =

Range of hills in Scotland

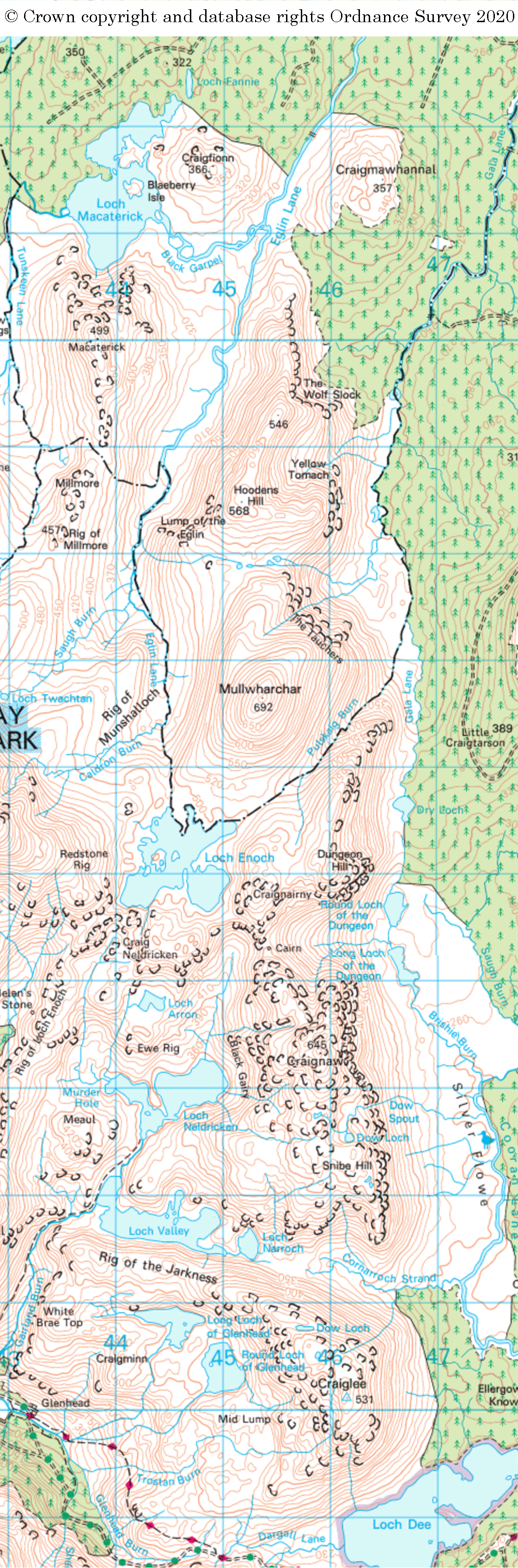

The Dungeon Hills are a range of hills in the Galloway Hills range, part of the Southern Uplands of Scotland. The central of three parallel ridges, they are neighboured by the Range of the Awful Hand to the west and the Rhinns of Kells to the east. The range is also perpendicular to the Minnigaff Hills range, immediately south. In total, these four ranges are part of the Galloway Forest Park.

== The Hills ==
The hills of the range are the lowest and craggiest of the Galloway Hills with the highest, Mullwharchar, reaching 692m. They are split between East Ayrshire and Dumfries and Galloway along the Mullwharchar-Dungeon Hill col, following the Pulskaig Burn. Often regarded as the roughest hills in the Southern Uplands, walks can frequently take longer than anticipated due to the underfoot conditions of tussocks and bog. The range is the most remote of the Galloway Hills as the nearest road link to the north is approximately 2 miles away at Craigmalloch on the banks of Loch Doon, requiring an approach along an unclassified road. As a result, many hillwalkers begin their walk at the Glentrool Visitor Centre to the southwest and follow the path past Loch Trool to then ascend opposite the Gairland Burn and eventually to Loch Valley and Loch Neldricken. A longer but initially easier path can be followed from the same start point, following the path to the Merrick, but cutting right at Culsharg bothy and following the Buchan Burn to Loch Enoch for a clockwise round instead.

From north to south the hills are:

| Summit | Height (m) | Listing |
|---|---|---|
| Craigmawhannal | 357 | Tu |
| Hoodens Hill | 568 | Tu,5,DDew |
| Mullwharchar | 692 | Ma,Hu,Tu,Sim, G, D,DN,Y |
| Dungeon Hill | 620 | Hu,Tu,Sim, D,GT,DN,Y |
| Craignairny | 595 | Tu,5,DDew |
| Craignaw | 645 | Ma,Hu,Tu,Sim, G, D,DN,Y |
| Snibe Hill | 531 | |
| Craiglee | 531 | Ma,Hu,Tu,5,DDew,Y |

== Ecology ==
The SSSI Ramsar Silver Flowe, lies directly east of the range, and is a blanket mire, described as the least-disturbed area of acid peatland in southern Scotland. It forms part of the Silver Flowe-Merrick Kells Biosphere Reserve, which incorporates a considerable portion of both ranges to the west and east, and is a Natura 2000 site. The area is very popular with invertebrates and swarms of Odonata, Syrphidae and Lepidoptera during summer are common. Most of the surrounding lochs suffered severe acidification in the past, however have made partial recoveries and Brown trout populations, often restocked, remain stable. The rivers Doon, Cree and Dee all either originate or have tributaries originating from the range.

== Etymology ==
A number of the surrounding landmarks have peculiar names not found anywhere else in Scotland. Names include: the Rig of the Jarkness, Clints of the Buss, Lump of the Eglin, the Wolf Slock and Seggy Gut. Most of the hill names are of Scottish Gaelic origin, such as Mullwharchar (Maol Adhairce).
