= Loch Neldricken =

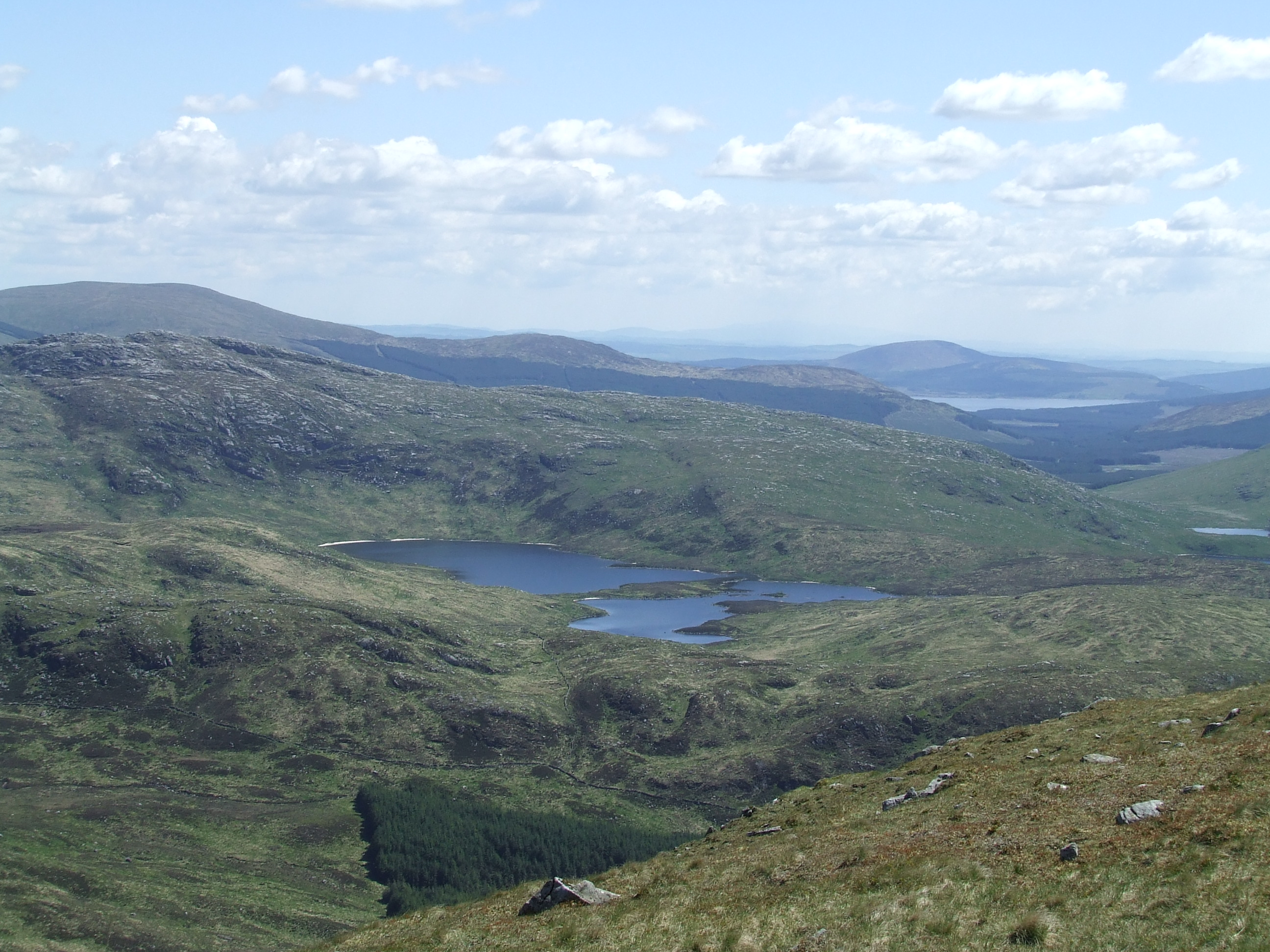
- The loch with Craignaw in the background.

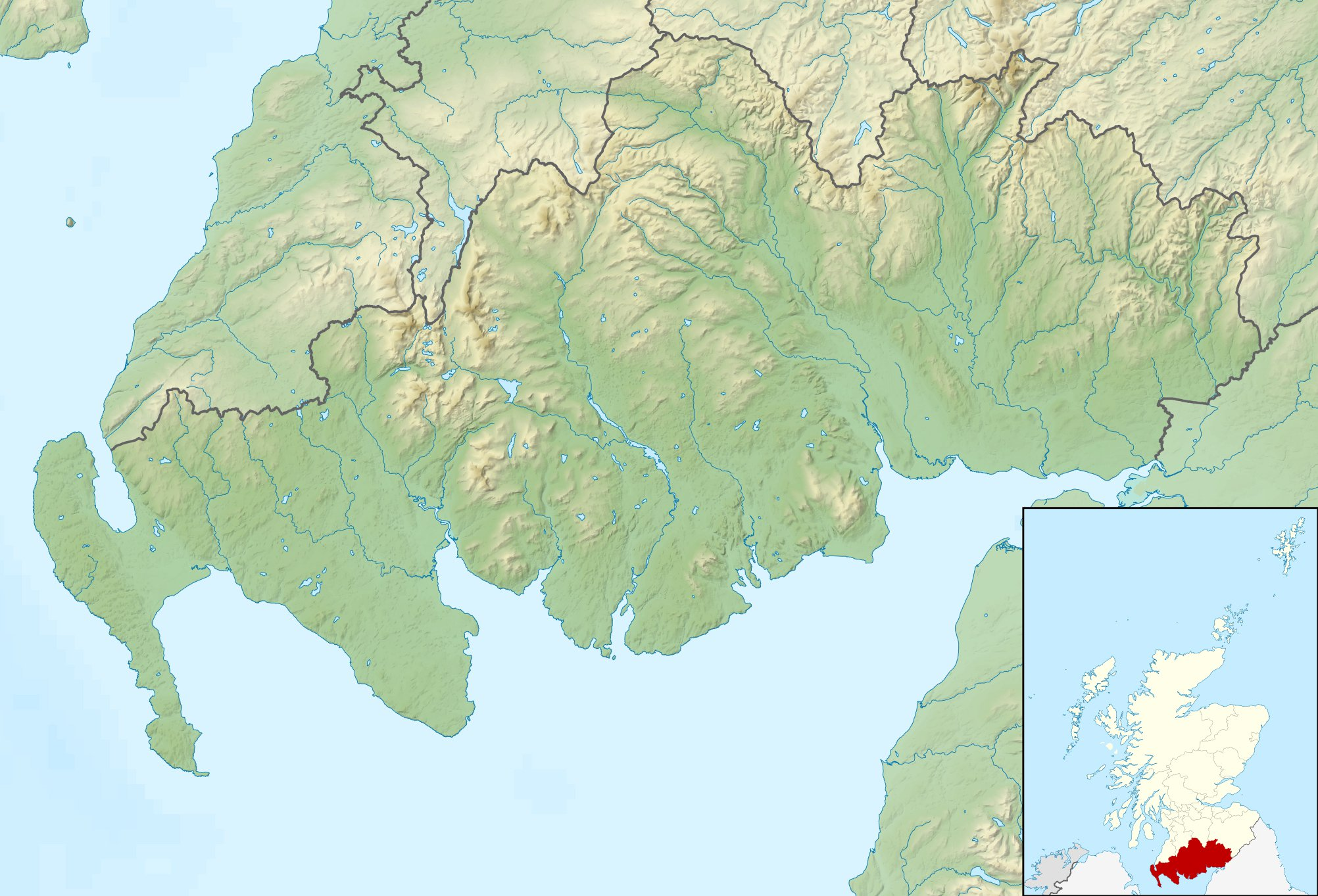
- Location within Dumfries and Galloway
- Location: Galloway, Scotland
- Coordinates: 55°07′00″N 4°26′20″W
- Type: freshwater loch
- Primary outflows: Mid Burn
- Basin countries: United Kingdom
- Max. length: 0.97 km (0.60 mi)
- Max. width: 0.6 km (0.37 mi)
- Surface area: 31 ha (77 acres)
- Average depth: 19 ft (5.8 m)
- Max. depth: 49 ft (15 m)
- Water volume: 66,404,816.44 ft^{3} (1,880,375.000 m^{3})
- Shore length^{1}: 4 km (2.5 mi)
- Surface elevation: 348 m (1,142 ft)
- ^{1} Shore length is not a well-defined measure.

Loch Neldricken is a loch in Galloway to the south-east of Merrick, south of Craig Neldricken and west of Craignaw. The loch is almost bisected by a long promontory. It drains via the short Mid Burn into Loch Valley and then via Gairland Burn down to Loch Trool.

An inlet at the west of the loch is marked on maps as 'Murder Hole' and features in SR Crockett's The Raiders. However, the original 'Murder Hole' was a well on the Glen Trool to Straiton road where the bodies of travellers who had been robbed and murdered were dumped and Crockett moved the location for his book.

The loch has suffered from acidification but has recovered to some extent, with the pH increasing from around 4.4 in 1978 to 5.4 in 2003. Between 1983 and 2003 the loch's DOC levels increased.

== Water Analysis ==
Concentrations of different elements in samples from June 2006
| Element | Concentration μg/l |
|---|---|
| CaCO_{3} | 0.20 |
| Li | 0.403 |
| Al | 131 |
| V | 0.300 |
| Cr | 0.191 |
| Fe | 52.0 |
| Fe DRC | 49.8 |
| Mn | 9.1 |
| Co | 0.059 |
| Ni | 0.442 |
| Cu | 0.272 |
| Zn | 3.48 |
| As | 0.289 |
| Se | 0.232 |
