= Dungeon Hill (hill) =

Hill in Dumfries and Galloway, Scotland

Coordinates: 55°08′09″N 4°25′0″W

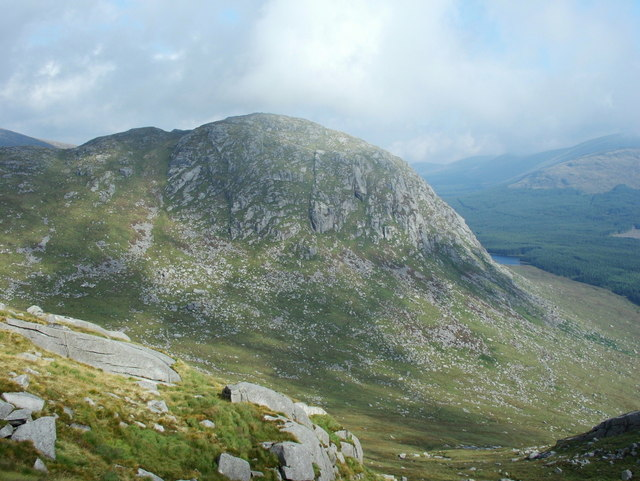
- Dungeon Hill seen from Craignaw

Highest point
- Elevation: 620 m (2,030 ft)
- Prominence: 115 m (377 ft)
- Listing: Hu,Tu,Sim,D,GT,DN,Y

Geography
- Location: Dumfries and Galloway, Scotland
- Parent range: Dungeon Hills, Galloway Hills, Southern Uplands
- OS grid: NX 46037 85077
- Topo map: OS Landranger 77

Dungeon Hill is a hill in the Dungeon Hills, a sub-range of the Galloway Hills range, part of the Southern Uplands of Scotland. Although it is the lowest of the three main hills along the ridge, it lends its name to the range. Normally climbed as part of a round of the Dungeon Hills and, occasionally, the Range of the Awful Hand, some ascents also begin from the east at Backhill of Bush bothy over the Silver Flowe, however the terrain is extremely demanding from this direction.
