= Glentrool =

Mountain biking routes in Scotland

Coordinates: 55°4′29″N 4°33′7″W

Glentrool is a collection of mountain biking routes through the heart of Galloway in southwest Scotland. The mountain bike routes are part of the 7Stanes project by Forestry and Land Scotland throughout the Scottish Borders and Dumfries and Galloway.

The most famous route at Glentrool is the 'Big Country' trail, based entirely on minor public roads and forest roads. The trail follows 58 km (36 mi) of road in a loop, starting and finishing at the Glentrool visitor centre. There are areas of off-road biking allowing riders of all experiences and age ranges to have a good time.

In early 2007 the Forestry Commission built a blue graded route which is 8 km (5 mi) long and follows purpose built singletrack in a loop from the visitor centre to Loch Trool and finishes back at the visitor centre.

Car parking and toilet facilities are available at the visitor centre also has a cafe with seasonal opening times from April to September.
