= River Cree =

River in Dumfries and Galloway, Scotland

Coordinates: 54°51′N 4°24′W

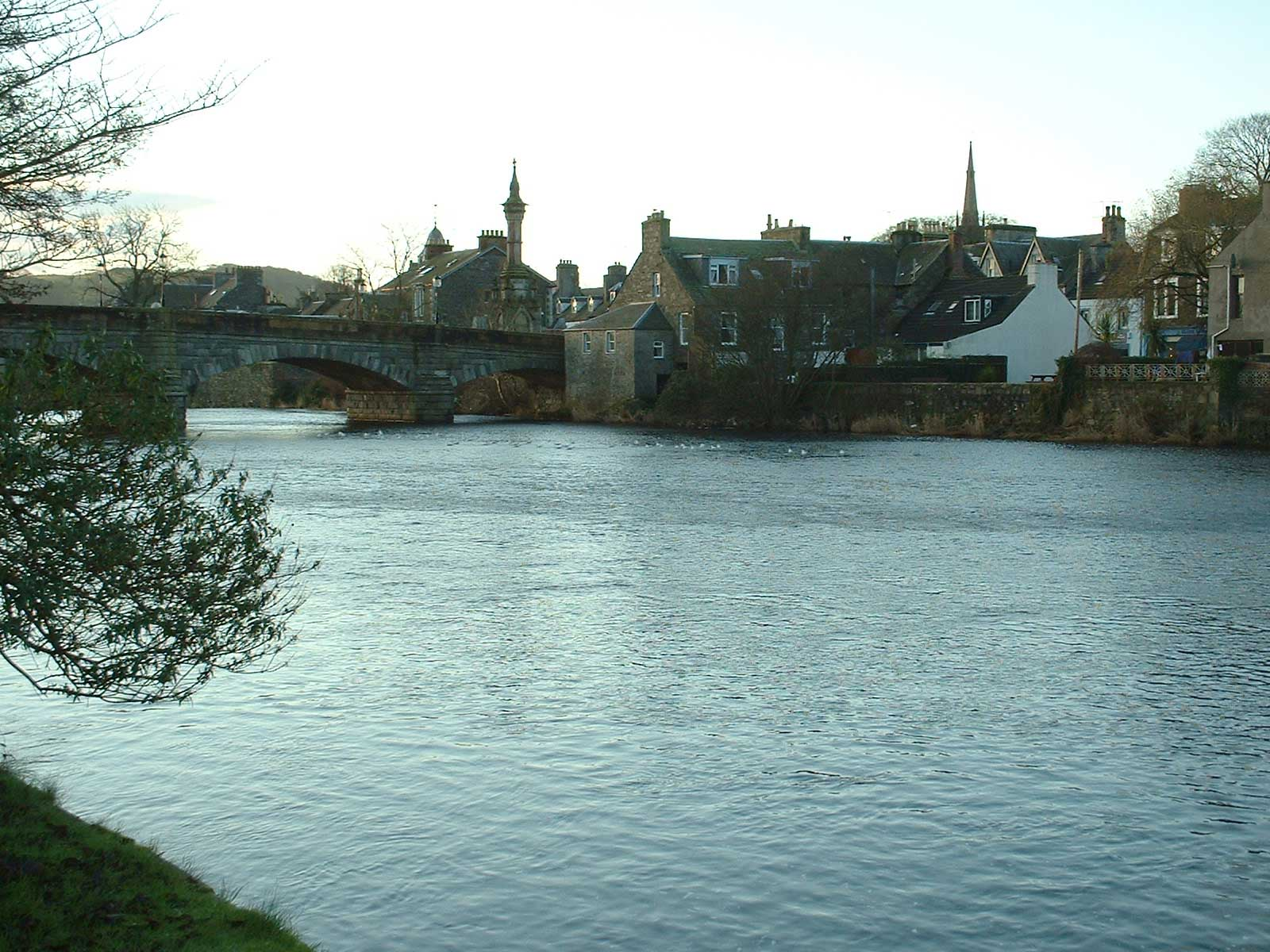
The Cree at Newton Stewart

The River Cree is a river in Dumfries and Galloway, Scotland which runs through Newton Stewart and into the Solway Firth. It forms part of the boundary between the counties of Wigtownshire and Kirkcudbrightshire. The tributaries of the Cree are the Minnoch, Trool, Penkiln and Palnure which drain from the Range of the Awful Hand, the labyrinthine range of mountains and lochs, bogs, burns and crags, rising at its highest to The Merrick, Galloway (2,764 ft or 842 m above sea level), 12 miles (19 kilometres) north and visible from Newton Stewart.

The Battle of the River Dee may have been fought at this river or at River Dee, Galloway in 1308, during the Scottish Wars of Independence.

The River Cree provided a route from the coast into the forested hinterland. Then it became the boundary between communities living on either side, dividing the County, or Shire, of Wigtownshire from the Stewartry of Kirkcudbright. It also divides the parish of Penninghame from the parish of Minnigaff and the town of Newton Stewart from the villages of Creebridge and Minnigaff, thus identifying a variety of administrative entities. There were very few bridges until the 18th century and tolls and local customs duties could be levied at such crossing points. The Cree was also the source of power for the textile mills built in Newton Stewart in the 18th century when water power was a key element in industrial development.

Most of the time, the Cree is fordable and the old site of the main ford, just below the present bridge, is still detectable in the street layout of Newton Stewart. The location of the first, wooden bridge and the boat ferry are still identifiable local landmarks just to the north of the present bridge.

A new steel bridge, the Sparling Bridge, was strung across the river downstream of the Town Bridge in 1998 as part of an attractive riverside walk. This bridge is named after the fish – the sparling or smelt (Osmerus eperlanus) which still breeds in the estuary, one of only three sites in Scotland. Largely for this reason the Cree estuary "The silty Cree" is a Site of Special Scientific Interest. The remaining bridge downstream of Newton Stewart is the bridge, built in 1979 as part of the A75 trunk road bypass.

Before there were proper roads, and before the railway came to Galloway in the 19th century, bulky goods such as coal and fertilisers, gravel and grain, timber and stone, were transported by sea. The Cree has a winding, silty estuary, not good for navigation, but there was a harbour at the Carty Port, a couple of miles south of Newton Stewart, and others further down the estuary at Wigtown and Creetown from which coastal cargoes were traded. Regular services linked the Solway ports with Liverpool. Although both of these ports are now almost derelict, there are still active fishing ports further south around the Machars peninsula at Garlieston, the Isle of Whithorn and Port William.

The shore is also home to fishing traditions, wildlife and a large expanse of salt marsh – the "inks". Wigtown Bay is now a recognised wildlife reserve, where salt marshes are grazed by sheep all year round and by huge flocks of wild geese in winter. The bay is particularly noted for the important numbers of pink-footed geese (Anser brachyrhynchus) that winter on the inks.

Salmon fisheries using stake nets can still be seen in the bay but are no longer common. Other traditional methods of salmon fishing using "haaf nets" have also declined. However, enthusiastic anglers return year after year to the Cree and fine fresh-run salmon are still caught in worthwhile numbers.

The silty Cree estuary is a Site of Special Scientific Interest, partly due to the sparling that breed there.
