= Shalloch on Minnoch =

Hill in the Southern Uplands of Scotland

Coordinates: 55°11′N 4°31′W

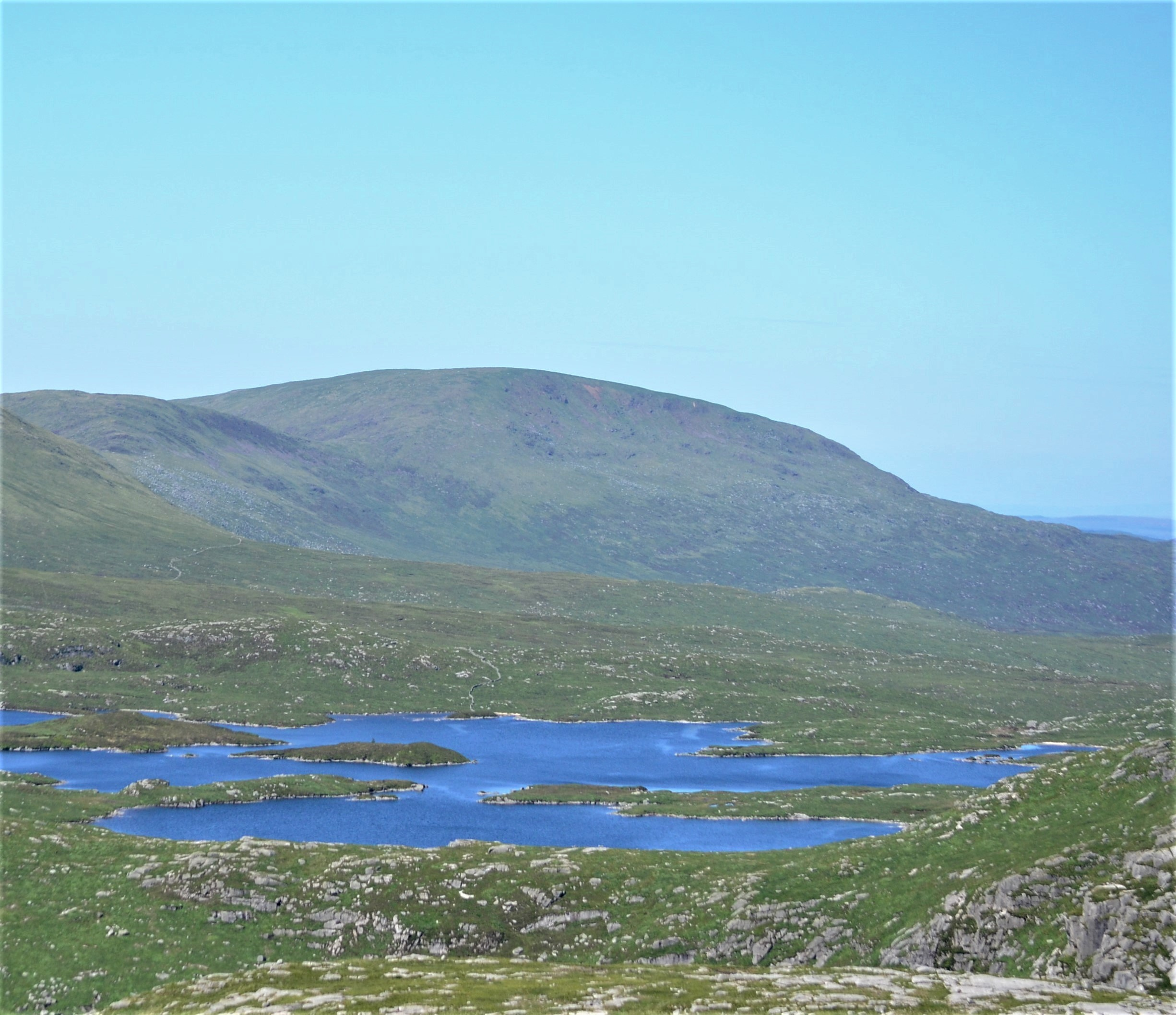

Highest point
- Elevation: 774.2 m (2,540 ft)
- Prominence: 193.6
- Listing: Ma,Hu,Tu,Sim, C, D,DN,Y

Naming
- Native name: Càrn Seilich
- English translation: Scottish Gaelic: either "Willow Place" or "Hunting place" by the Water of Minnoch. The Gaelic name means "Willowy Cairn"

Geography
- Location: South Ayrshire, Scotland
- Parent range: Range of the Awful Hand, Galloway Hills, Southern Uplands
- OS grid: NX 40766 90561
- Topo map: OS Landranger 77

Shalloch on Minnoch (Scottish Gaelic: Càrn Seilich) is a hill in the Range of the Awful Hand, a sub-range of the Galloway Hills range, part of the Southern Uplands of Scotland. It is frequently climbed from Stinchar bridge to the north, or as part of a full traverse of the range.

It was likely originally called Bellachgy Hill (from Scottish Gaelic: Beinn a' Bhealaich Gaoithe), before taking the name Cairnshalloch (Càrn Seilich) after the Shalloch estate. The mountain then took, in English, the name of the farm itself: Shalloch on Minnoch.

== Subsidiary SMC Summits ==
| Summit | Height (m) | Listing |
|---|---|---|
| Caerloch Dhu [Shalloch on Minnoch North Top] | 659.5 | Tu,Sim,DT,GT,DN |

Caerloch Dhu in Gaelic is called An Ceatharlach Dubh – "the black place of four-footed animals" (either deer or cows).
