= Loch Valley =

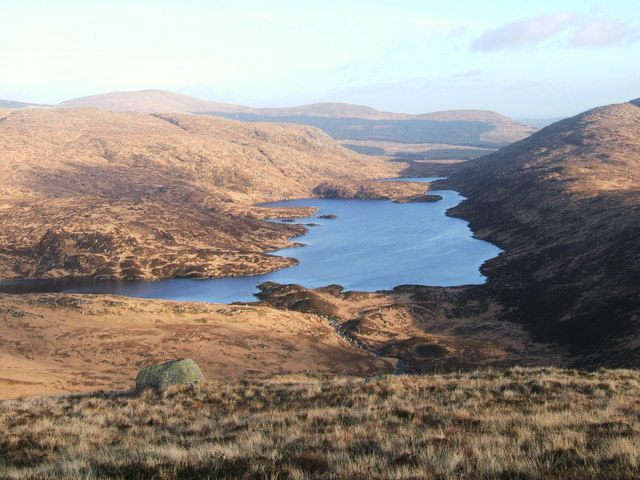
- The loch viewed from Buchan Hill, looking east. Loch Narroch is visible at the far end.

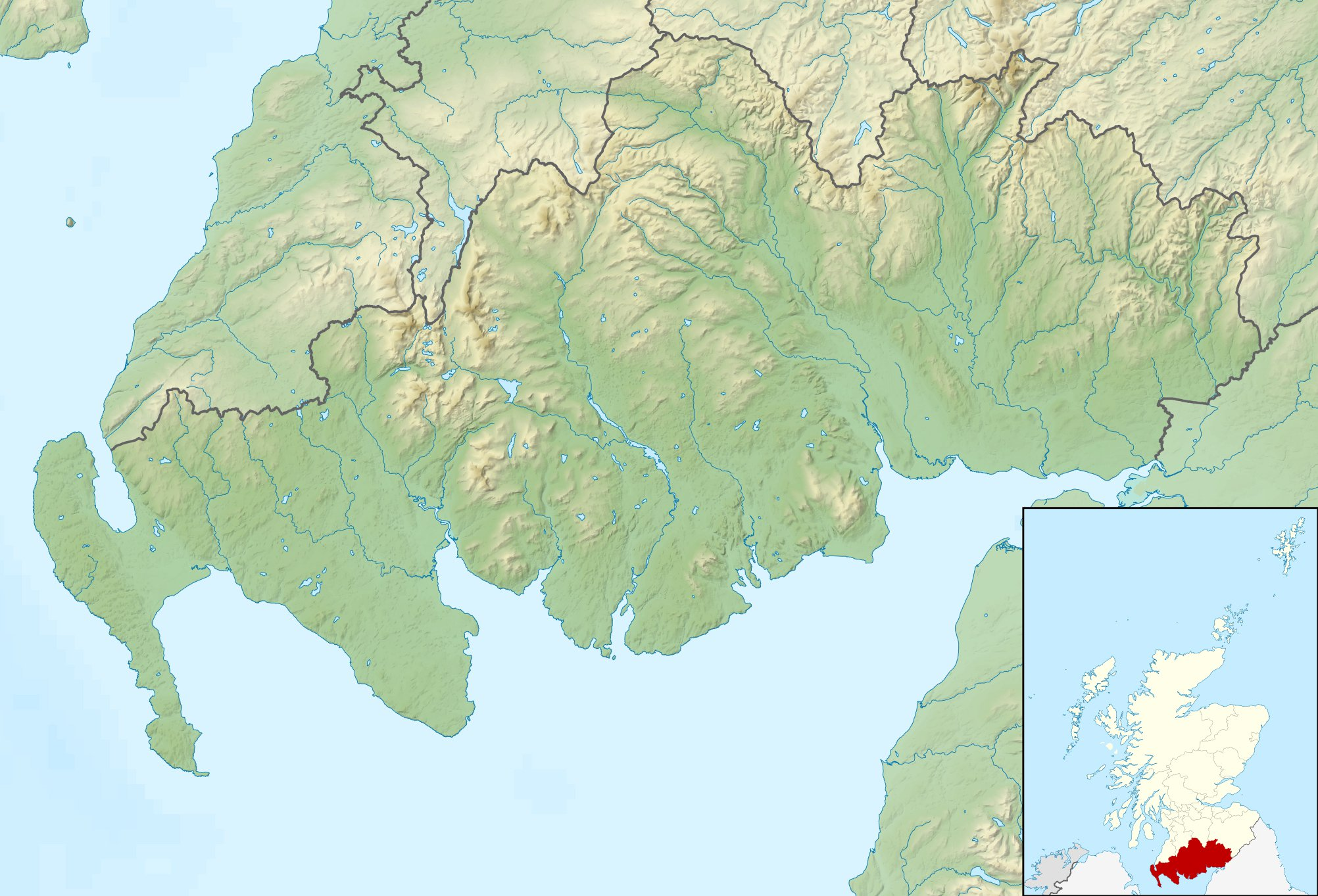
- Location within Dumfries and Galloway
- Location: Galloway, Scotland
- Coordinates: 55°06′15″N 4°26′20″W
- Type: freshwater loch
- Primary inflows: Mid Burn, Loch Narroch
- Primary outflows: Gairland Burn
- Basin countries: United Kingdom
- Surface area: 37.2 ha (92 acres)
- Surface elevation: ~320 m (1,050 ft)

Loch Valley is a loch in Galloway Forest Park to the east of Buchan Hill, north of the Rig of the Jarkness and southwest of Craignaw. It drains via Gairland Burn down to Loch Trool.

The loch has a catchment area entirely on the Loch Doon granite, is oligotrophic, and has suffered from gradual acidification since the mid-19th century leading to the elimination of the original Brown Trout population. It has recovered to some extent, with the pH increasing slowly from around 4.4 in 1978 to 5.2 in 2003.

Between 1983 and 2003 the loch's dissolved organic carbon levels increased, and the loch had a sediment accumulation rate of around 0.01 g cm^{−2} yr^{−1} from 1850 to 1975.

== Water Analysis ==
Concentrations of different elements in samples from June 2006
Element	Concentration μg/l
CaCO_{3}	-100
Li	0.352
Al	130
V	0.263
Cr	0.199
Fe	45.9
Fe DRC	43.9
Mn	11.0
Co	0.063
Ni	0.852
Cu	0.209
Zn	3.43
As	0.226
Se	0.198
