= Glen Trool =

Glen in the Southern Uplands, Galloway, Scotland

Coordinates: 55.081°N 4.510°W

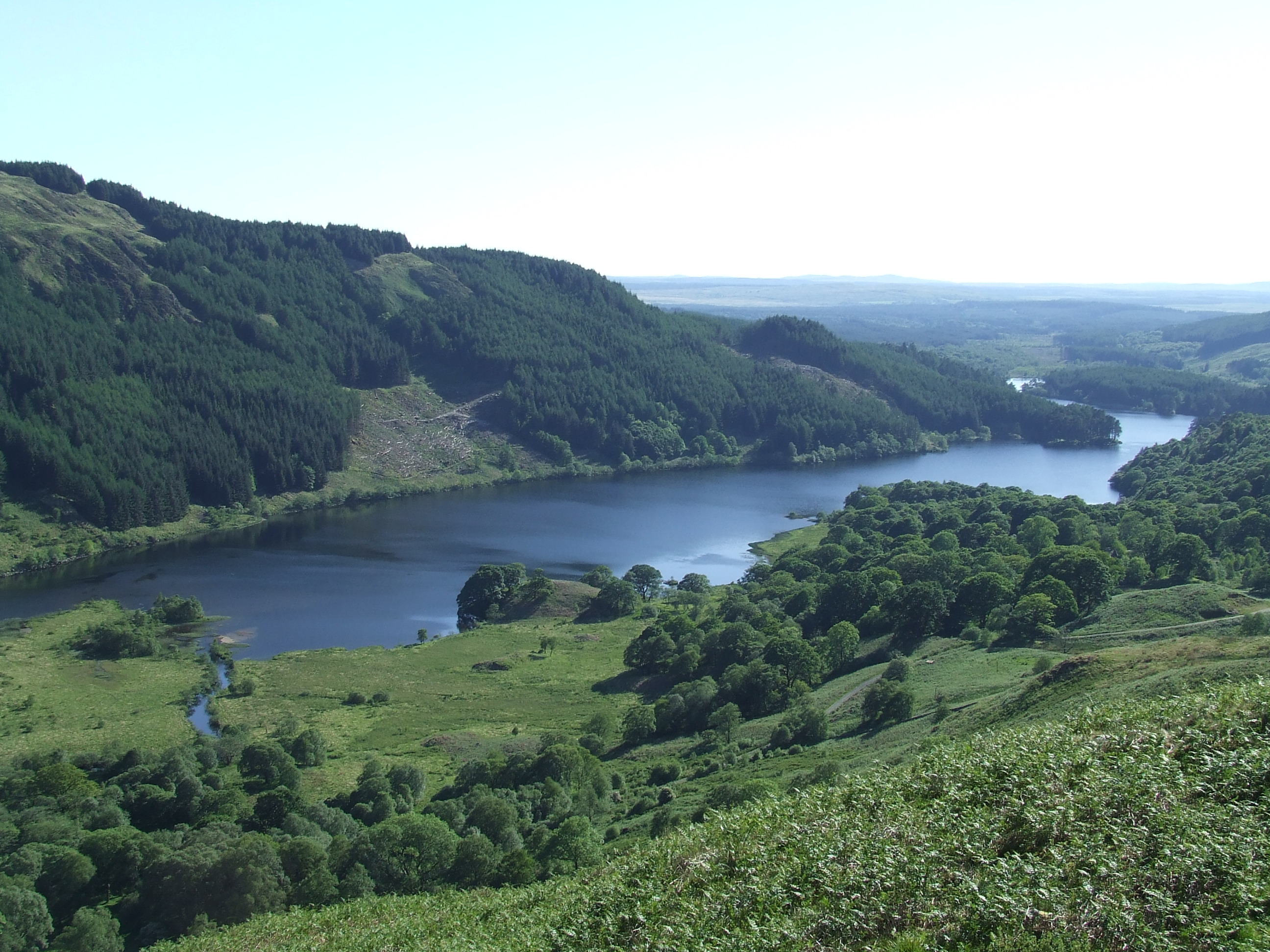
Loch Trool and Glen Trool

Glentrool (Scottish Gaelic: Gleann an t-Sruthail) is a glen in the Southern Uplands, Galloway, Scotland. It contains Loch Trool which is fed by several burns and drained by the Water of Trool. North of Glen Trool is Merrick, the highest mountain in the Southern Uplands. The glen has a visitors centre and campsite. In April 1307 it was the site of the infamous Battle of Glen Trool.
