= Craignaw =

Coordinates: 55.12005°N 4.41793°W

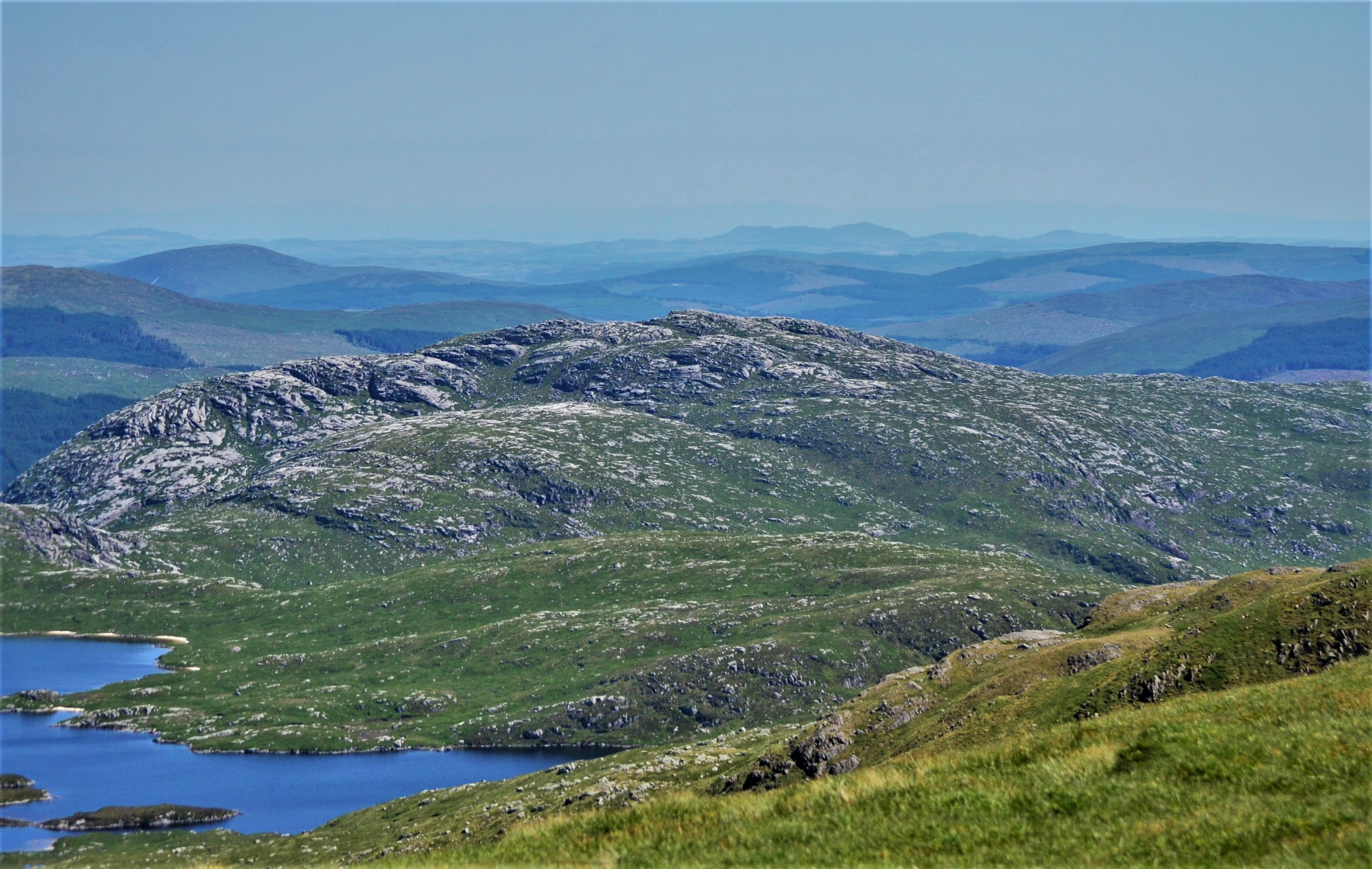

Highest point
- Elevation: 645 m (2,116 ft)
- Prominence: 151 m (495 ft)
- Listing: Ma,Hu,Tu,Sim, G, D,DN,Y

Geography
- Location: Dumfries and Galloway, Scotland
- Parent range: Dungeon Hills, Galloway Hills, Southern Uplands
- OS grid: NX 45925 83332
- Topo map: OS Landranger 77

Craignaw is a hill in the Dungeon Hills, a sub-range of the Galloway Hills range, part of the Southern Uplands of Scotland. Unlike many hills in the Southern Uplands, Craignaw has a complex and rocky summit area, with a long line of crags and rough ground on the east side. The hill is largely composed of granite. Near the north end of the hill is an interesting area of terrain known as the "Deil's Bowlin' Green" where various rounded granite boulders are scattered at random over an area of nearly horizontal granite slabs. These are believed to be glacial erratics or result from a similar glacier process. On the west side of the hill, near grid reference NX458831, a few hundred meters from the summit is an F-111E Aardvark crash site. The site is marked by a small memorial to the two U.S. Air Force pilots who were killed in the accident (Captains Spaulding and Hetzner). Although the crash happened on 19 December 1979 there are still small amounts of aircraft debris in the area.

== Walking ==
Craignaw is quite a remote hill and climbing it is a long and rough walk from the road-ends at either Craigencallie or Bruces Stane.

Craignaw Photo Tour – 29 images from the Bruces Stone Car Park to the Summit and Back via the Loch Valley Trail

== Climbing ==
There is some good but short rock climbing on Craignaw at Snibe Hill, Memorial Crag and Scotland Slab. However, in winter after a good freeze the broken ground on the east side of the hill has some of the best ice climbs in Southern Scotland with routes of up to 150 m in length. The most famous of these is the frozen waterfall of the Dow Spout.
