= Battle of Glen Trool =

Minor engagement in the First War of Scottish Independence, fought in April 1307

Coordinates: 55.090°N 4.487°W

- Part of First War of Scottish Independence
Date	April, 1307
Location	Glen Trool, Scotland
Result	Scottish victory

Belligerents
Kingdom of Scotland	Kingdom of England

Commanders and leaders
Robert the Bruce	Earl of Pembroke

Strength
Several hundred infantry	Several hundred cavalry

Casualties and losses
Light	Heavy

The Battle of Glen Trool was a minor engagement in the First War of Scottish Independence, fought in April 1307. Glen Trool is a narrow glen in the Southern Uplands of Galloway, Scotland. Loch Trool is aligned on an east–west axis and is flanked on both sides by steep rising hills, making it ideal for an ambush. The battlefield is currently under research to be inventoried and protected by Historic Scotland under the Scottish Historical Environment Policy of 2009.

Robert Bruce had been crowned King of Scots after being involved in the killing of John "the Red" Comyn, a leading rival, a long time enemy, and one of the most powerful men in Scotland, the previous year 1306. Robert the Bruce's rightful claim to the Scottish throne led to a war between King Robert and King Edward I and his allies the Comyns and the MacDougalls.

== Return of King Robert the Bruce ==
After his defeat at the Battle of Methven and subsequently, at the Battle of Dalrigh in the summer of 1306 the recently crowned King Robert was little better than a fugitive, disappearing altogether from the historical record for a number of months. It wasn't until the spring of 1307 that he made a reappearance, landing in the south-west of Scotland with soldiers recruited, for the most part, from the Macdonald controlled Isles (not merely the Western Isles that today are the Outer Hebrides but all the Isles. It was an understandable move; for he came ashore in his own earldom of Carrick, where he could expect to command a large degree of local support. Perhaps even more important, the countryside itself was well known to Bruce, and there were plenty of remote and difficult areas that allowed cover and protection for his men.

The English border was not far distant; all of the local castles were strongly held by Edward's forces; and, perhaps most important of all, the Lordship of Galloway, the old Balliol patrimony, was adjacent to Carrick, and controlled by the MacDoualls, hostile to King Robert the Bruce and his cause. When his brothers Thomas and Alexander, Dean of Glasgow attempted a landing on the shores of Loch Ryan, they met with disaster at the hands of Dungal MacDouall, the leading Balliol supporter in the area.

== "Steps of Trool" ==
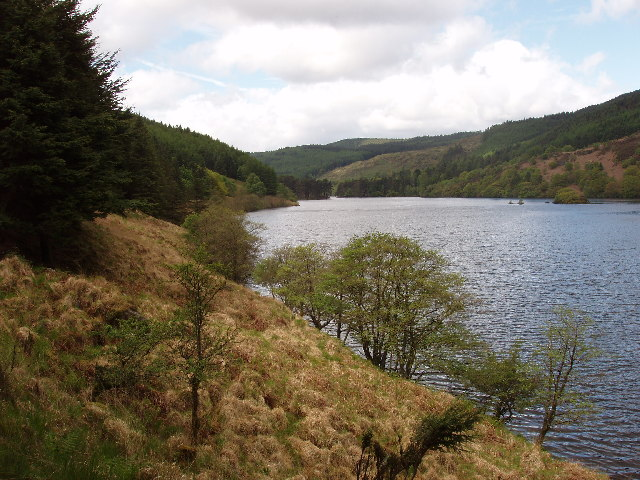
Approximate site of the Battle of Glen Trool, 1307

King Robert managed to establish a firm base in the area but it was vital that he made progress against the enemy if his cause was to attract the additional support that was so clearly needed. An early success came with a raid on an English camp on the eastern shores of the Clatteringshaws Loch. It also alerted the enemy to his presence. Aymer de Valence, King Robert's second cousin and opponent at Methven, received intelligence that his enemy was encamped at the head of Glen Trool.

This was a difficult position to approach, for the loch takes up much of the glen, with only a narrow track bordered by a steep slope. Near the middle, the hill pushes forward in a precipitous abutment. Valence sent a raiding party ahead, of unknown size, perhaps hoping to catch the enemy off-guard in much the same fashion as at Methven. This time, however, King Robert made effective use of the terrain. King Robert sent some of his men up the slope with orders to loosen with levers and crow-bars as many of the detached blocks of granite as they could.

As the English approached up the defile, called by the locals the "Steps of Trool", they were forced to proceed single file. King Robert observed their progress from across the loch and, at a given signal, his men pushed the wall of boulders down the slope. This was followed by arrows and hand-to-hand combat as King Robert's men charged down the slope. However, some question the likelihood of being able to charge down an extremely steep 700-meter slope. The narrowness of the path prevented support from either the front or the rear. Without room to maneuver, many of the English below were killed, and the rest withdrew. King Robert not only survived but went on the following month to win the significant engagement against the humiliated Earl of Pembroke at the Battle of Loudoun Hill.

The English soldiers killed in the battle at Glen Trool were buried in flat ground at the head of the loch, known as Soldier's Holm.

The defeat by Bruce and his 300 men of the Earl of Pembroke and his 1500 heavy cavalry was a "major victory" for King Robert and a great boost to the morale of his men. The Earl of Pembroke tried again at Loudoun in May 1307 and was soundly defeated. proving that Bruce had acquired an ability to change and adapt to circumstances, using his knowledge of the landscape, his training in battle as a knight and employing the tactics of William Wallace of ambushes and surprise attacks, and advancing and retreating as the occasion demanded.

== Bruce's Stone ==
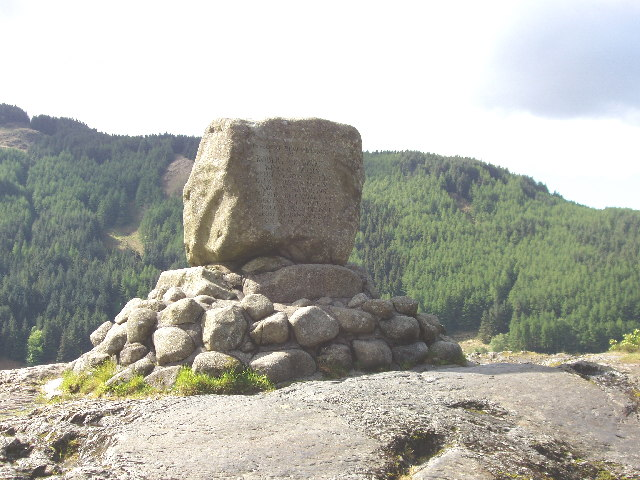
Bruce's Stone, Loch Trool

Bruce's Stone is a large granite boulder commemorating King Robert's victory in 1307. It is atop the hill on the north side of Loch Trool. In 1929, on the 600th anniversary of Bruce's death, it was placed high above the northern shore of Loch Trool, from where, legend has it, he had commanded the ambush that took place on the Steps of Trool on the other side of the loch. It also serves as a starting spot for the challenging walk up Merrick (2764 feet), the highest mountain in southern Scotland.
