= Range of the Awful Hand =

Range of hills in the Galloway Hills range in Scotland

Coordinates: 55°09′07″N 4°29′27″W

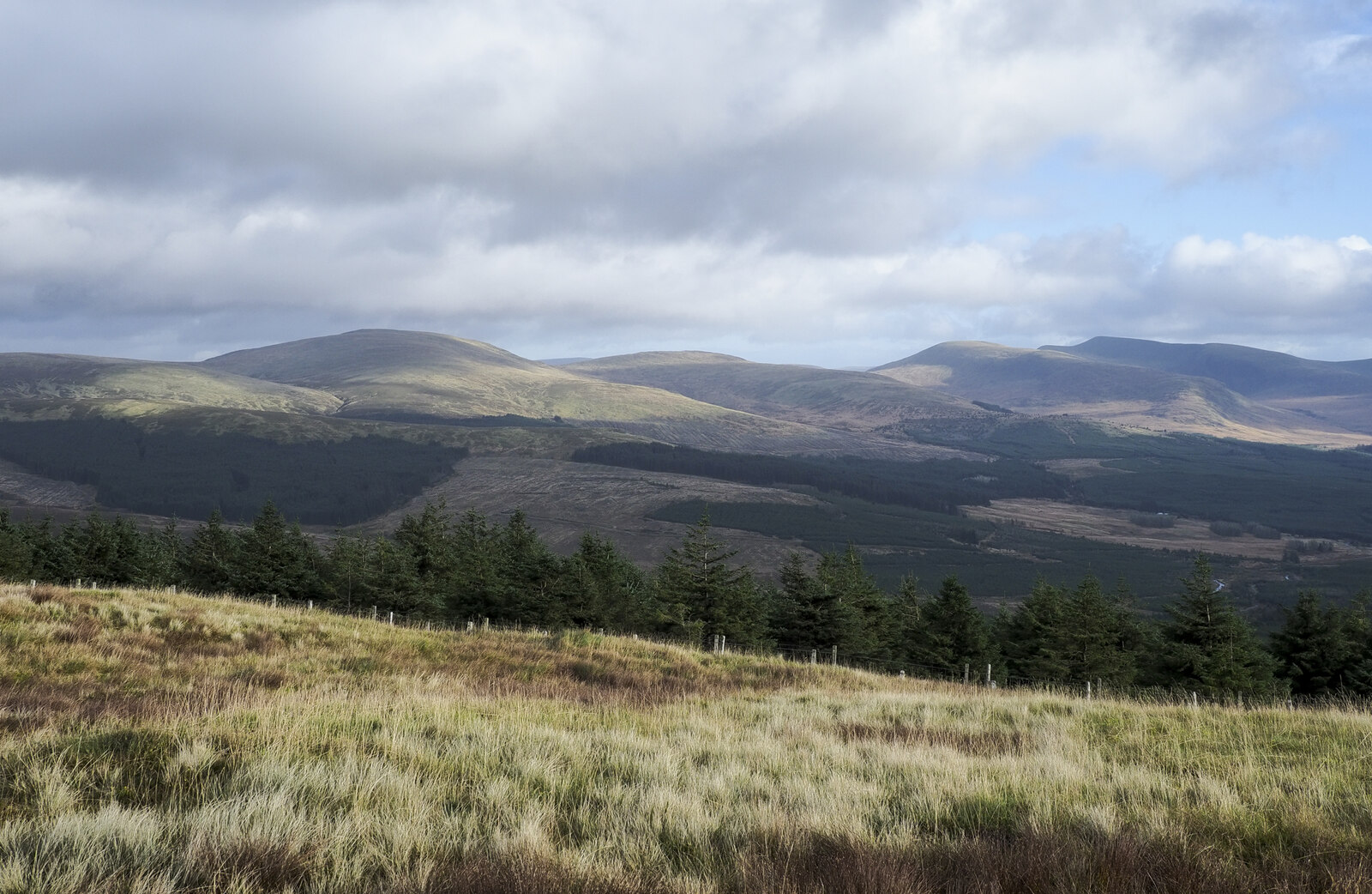
View of the four "fingers" of the range

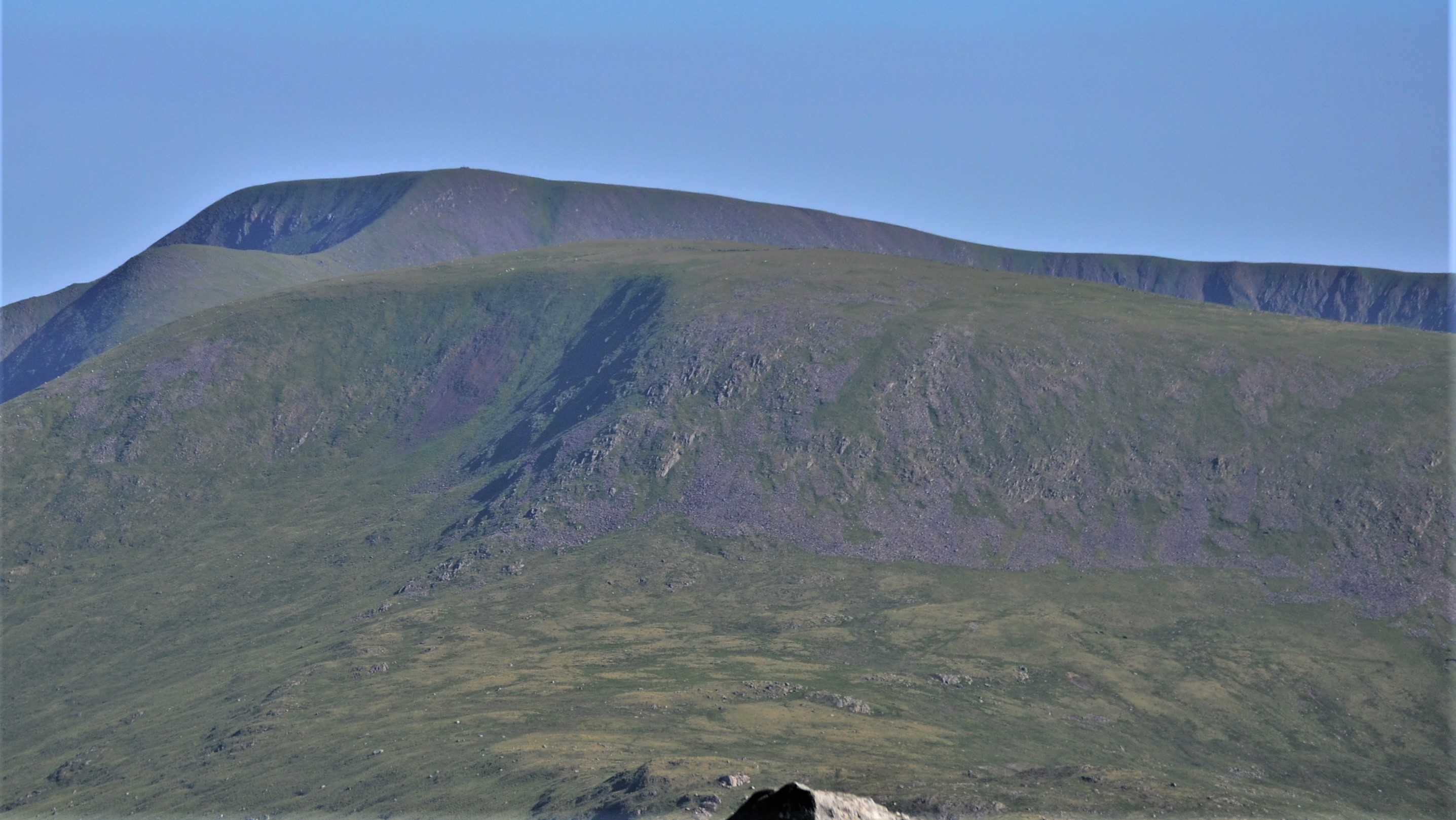
Kirriereoch Hill with the Merrick behind it, seen from Tarfessock

The Range of the Awful Hand is a group of hills in the Galloway Hills, part of the Southern Uplands of Scotland. It includes the Merrick, the highest peak in southern Scotland, reaching 843 m (2,766 ft). The range is named for its resemblance to an enormous right hand, Benmore or Benyellary being the thumb, Merrick the forefinger, Kirriereoch Hill the middle finger, Tarfessock the ring finger, and Shalloch on Minnoch the little finger. (Note: The name was seemingly coined by John Mactaggart, who wrote in The Scottish Gallovidian Encyclopedia (1824): "In the morning and evening the shadows of these hills on the level moors below seem like the fingers of an awful hand.")

The range is the westernmost of three parallel ranges running north and south across the Galloway Forest Park. The other two are the Dungeon Hills and the Rhinns of Kells. The Minnigaff Hills also lie close by, being separated from the southern end of the range by Glen Trool. Administratively, the range is divided between South Ayrshire and Dumfries and Galloway, the border running along the crest of Kirriereoch Hill.
