= Merrick (Galloway) =

Mountain in the Range of the Awful

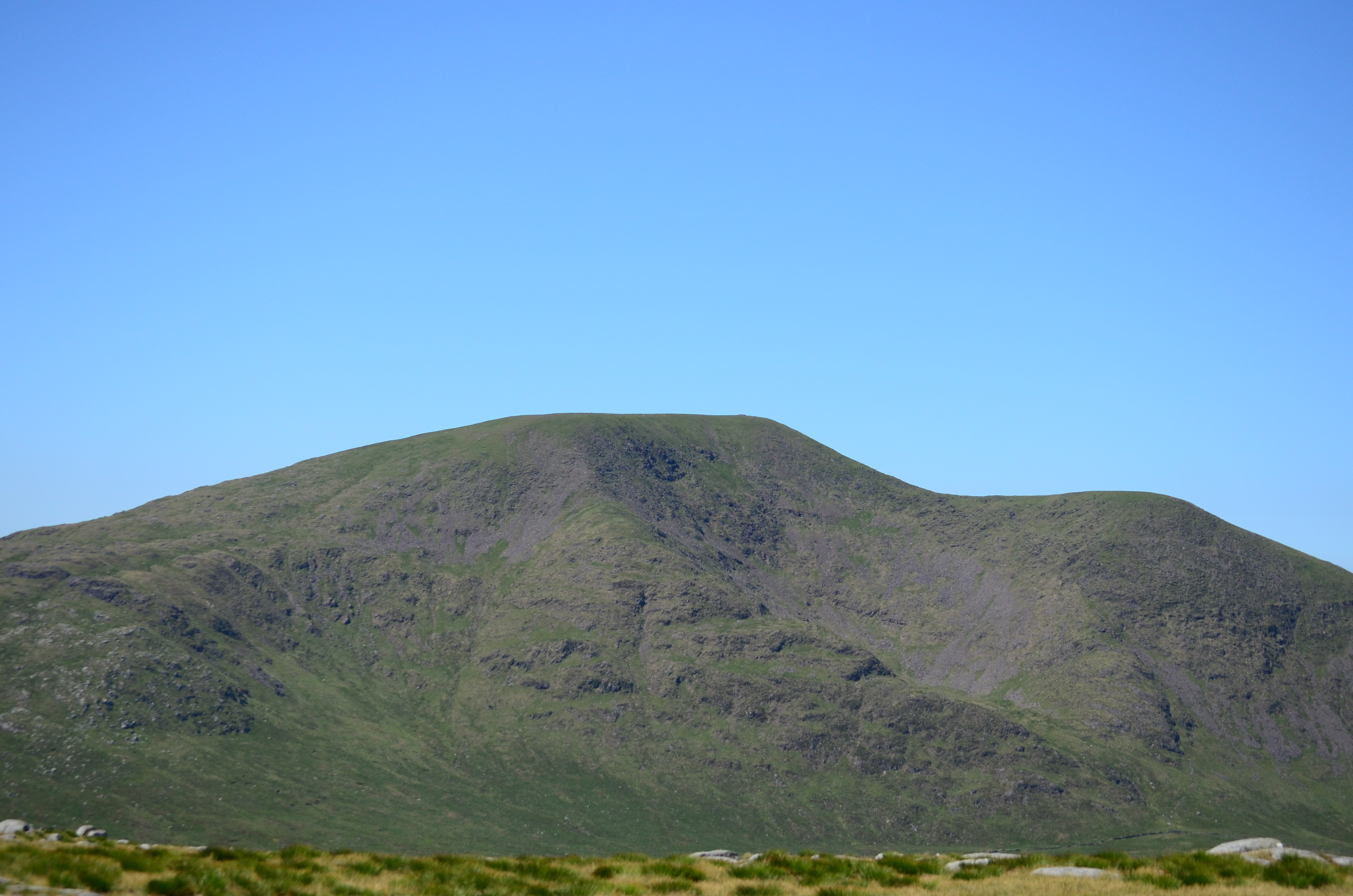

Highest point
- Elevation: 843 m (2,766 ft)
- Prominence: 705 m
- Listing: Marliyn HuMP,Tu,Simm, Corbett,Donald,Scottish County top,CoU,Council area top (Dumfries and Galloway),DN,Y,T100,P600,P500
- Coordinates: 55.1393°N 4.4684°W

Naming
- Native name: Scottish Gaelic: Beinn Mheurach
- English translation: fingered mountain

Geography
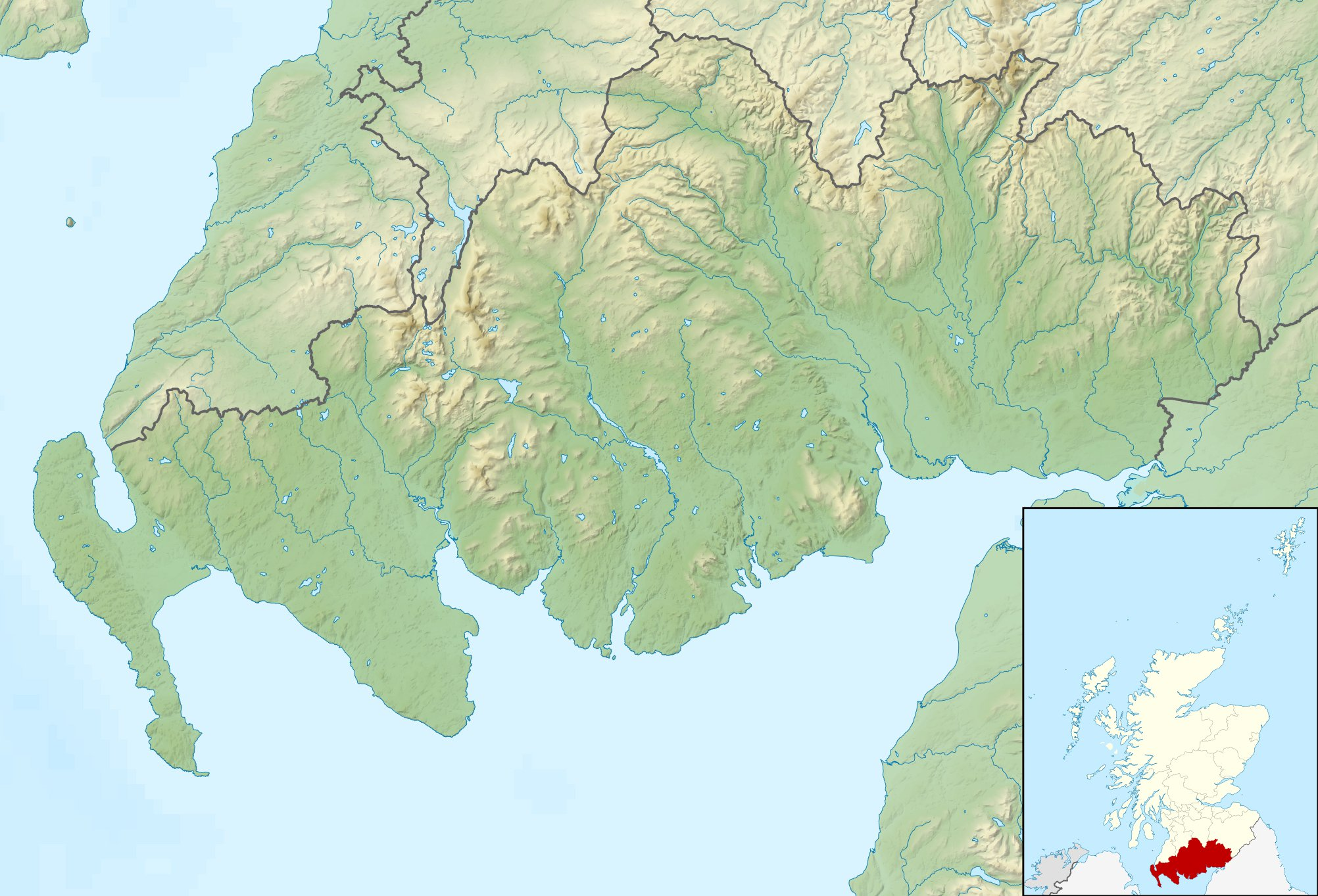
- Location within Dumfries and Galloway Location within Scotland
- Location: Southern Uplands, Scotland
- Parent range: Range of the Awful Hand, Southern Uplands
- OS grid: NX 42760 85547
- Topo map: OS Landranger 77

The Merrick (from Scottish Gaelic: Beinn Mheurach) is a mountain in the Range of the Awful Hand, a sub-range of the Galloway Hills range, part of the Southern Uplands of Scotland. The summit elevation is 843 metres (2,766 feet), making it the highest mountain in the Southern Uplands and southern Scotland.

== Line of sight ==
The 144-mile (232 km) view between Merrick and Snowdon is the longest line of sight in the British Isles . Although theoretically visible, looking from S-N, Merrick is almost entirely obscured by Lamachan Hill and as such, confirmed sightings are very rare.

== Granite boulders ==
An interesting feature on the mountain is the presence of several large partly buried granite boulders at about 800 m on the broad west ridge. They are glacial erratics, but the exact mechanism is unclear that has brought them to rest close to the highest point of the Southern Uplands and over 200 m higher than any currently occurring granite in the Galloway Hills.

== Walking ==
The shortest route of ascent is from the car park in Glen Trool. The car park is located near Bruce's Stone, a monument commemorating the victory of Robert the Bruce over the English forces of Edward II at the Battle of Glen Trool in 1307. The Merrick is a relatively straightforward and easy hike from the car park near Bruce's Stone. The route climbs past the Culsharg bothy then up on to Benyellary. After dropping slightly the final climb to the summit trig-point is made. Be aware that if descending in poor visibility a very common mistake is to walk down the west ridge into remote terrain. The total round-trip distance from Glen Trool to the summit and back is approximately 9 miles (14 kilometres).

== Climbing ==
Because of the nature of the rock, no good rock climbing has been recorded on the Merrick. However, in winter after a good freeze there are a number of good ice climbs of up to 200 m on the Black Gairy, which lies west of the summit.

== Subsidiary SMC Summits ==
Benyellary (Scottish Gaelic: Beinn na h-Iolaire, lit. 'Eagle Mountain' but likely originally from Beinn na h-Eileirig, 'Deer-trap Mountain') is the Merrick's only subsidiary summit, sitting to the south at 719 metres (2,359 ft). Its listings are Tu, Sim, DT, GT, DN.

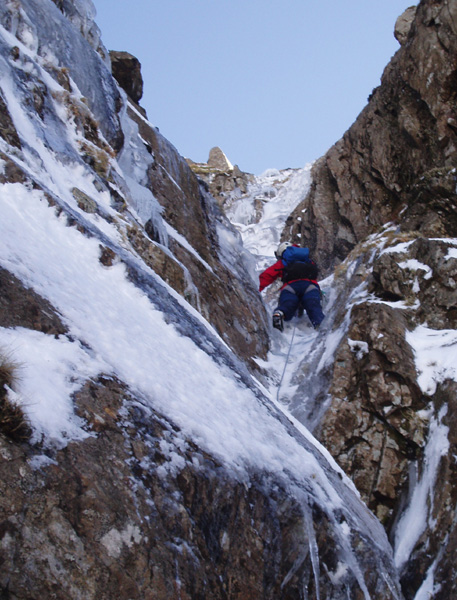
Ice climbing in the Black Gutter, Merrick

== See also ==
- Galloway Hills
- Southern Uplands
