= Loch Trool =

Lake in Dumfries and Galloway, Scotland

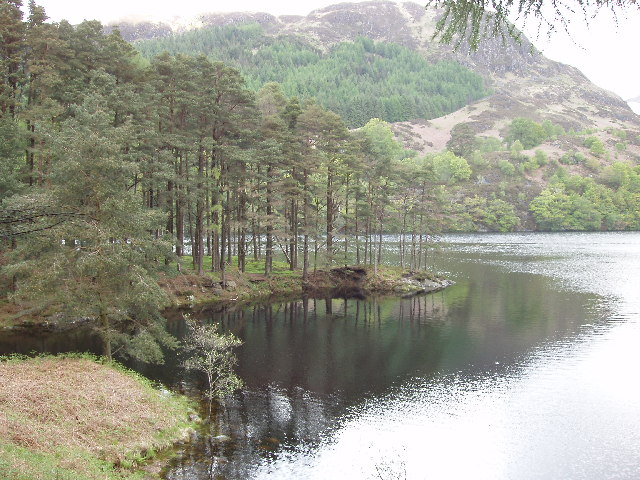

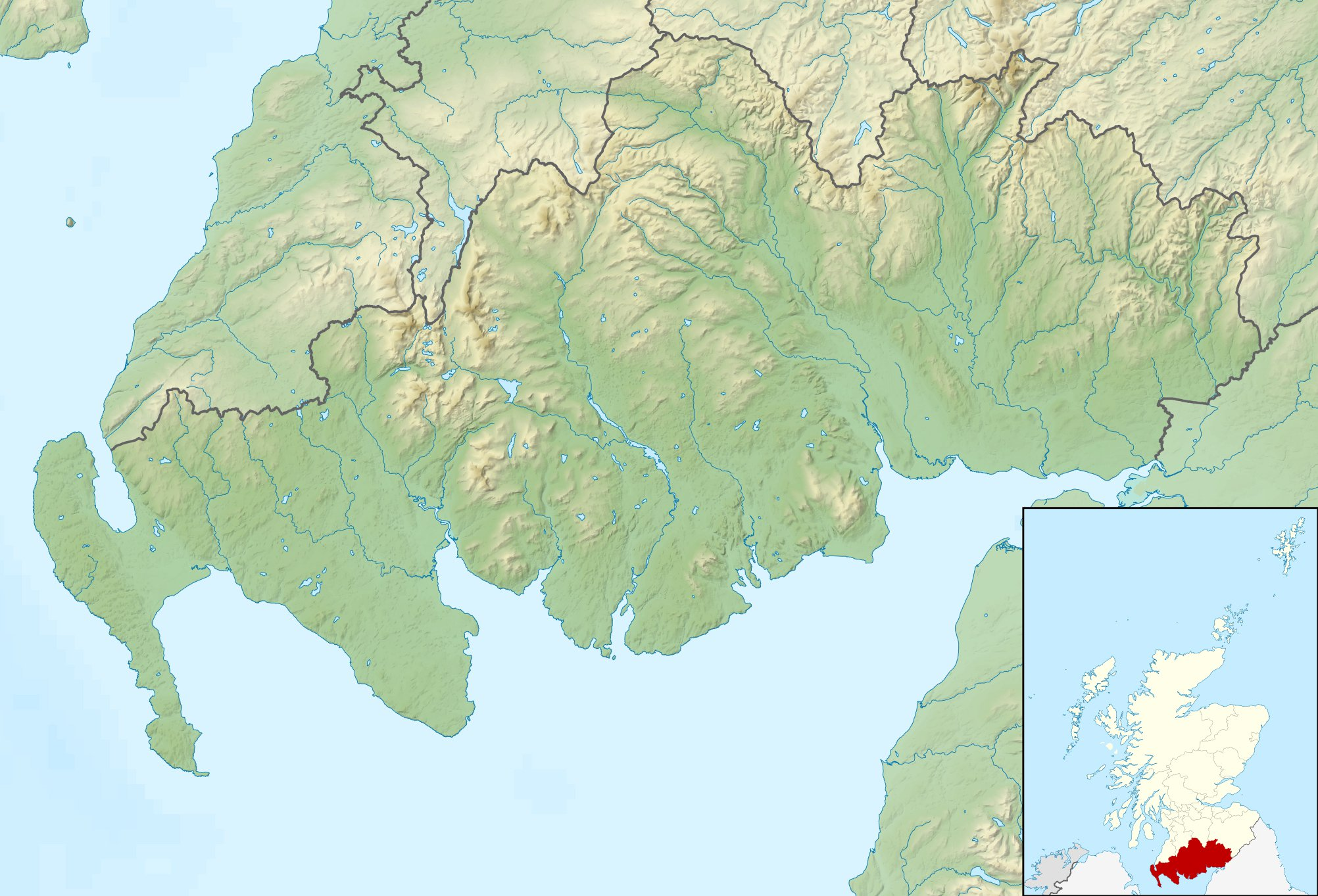
- Location within Dumfries and Galloway
- Location: Dumfries and Galloway, Scotland
- Coordinates: 55°05′17″N 4°29′29″W
- Type: freshwater loch
- Primary inflows: Pulnabrick, Buchan, Gairland, Glenhead, Pulharrow Burns.
- Primary outflows: Water of Trool
- Basin countries: Scotland
- Max. length: 2.4 km (1.5 mi)
- Max. width: 400 m (1,300 ft)
- Surface area: 55.6 ha (137 acres)
- Average depth: 2.3 m (7.5 ft)
- Max. depth: 17 m (55 ft)
- Water volume: 3,300,000 m^{3} (116,000,000 ft^{3})
- Shore length^{1}: 6.7 km (4.2 mi)
- Surface elevation: 75 m (246 ft)
- Islands: 1
- ^{1} Shore length is not a well-defined measure.

Loch Trool is a narrow, freshwater loch in Galloway, in the Southern Uplands in south-west Scotland. It lies in an elevated position in Glen Trool in the Galloway Forest Park and is approximately 8 miles (13 km) north of the town of Newton Stewart. The loch is the source of the Water of Trool which flows to the Water of Minnoch and the River Cree. There is a walking trail and footpath around the loch's perimeter.

In April 1307 Robert the Bruce fought and won the Battle of Glen Trool on the shores of the loch. On its north side stands Bruce's Stone which commemorates the victory.

Loch Trool is also reported to be the darkest place in the UK at night.

== Survey ==
The loch was surveyed in 1903 by James Murray and later charted as part of Sir John Murray's Bathymetrical Survey of Fresh-Water Lochs of Scotland 1897-1909.
