= Angus Paton =

British civil engineer (1905–1999)

Sir Angus Paton CMG FRS FREng FICE FIStructE
- Born: Thomas Angus Lyall Paton; 10 May 1905; Jersey, U.K.
- Died: 7 April 1999 (aged 93); St Helier, Jersey, U.K.
- Spouse: Eleanor Joan Delme-Murray
- Children: 4
- Engineering career
- Discipline: Civil
- Institutions: Institution of Civil Engineers (president), Smeatonian Society of Civil Engineers (president)
- Projects: Kariba Dam, Aswan High Dam, Indus Basin Project

Sir Thomas Angus Lyall Paton (10 May 1905 – 7 April 1999) was a British civil engineer from Jersey. Paton was born into a family that had founded the civil engineering firms of Easton, Gibb & Son and Sir Alexander Gibb & Partners and he would spend his entire professional career working for the latter. Following his graduation from University College London one of his first jobs was the construction of a dam in Maentwrog in Wales. Paton later became an expert on dams and much of his career was devoted to their construction. In 1931 he undertook an economic survey of Canada which recommended a programme of works for its port system. This report was still being used into the 1970s. During the Second World War Paton was involved with the construction of gun emplacements in the Dardanelles, Turkey and of caissons for the Mulberry Harbours used after the Invasion of Normandy.

After the Second World War, Paton undertook an economic survey of Syria, which made recommendations for port, water infrastructure, irrigation and hydroelectric improvements. This was followed by a similar report on Lebanon and one on the possibility of extending railways from Northern Rhodesia to neighbouring countries. From 1946, Paton worked almost exclusively on hydroelectric projects, beginning with the Owen Falls Hydroelectric Scheme in Uganda. He also worked on the Kariba Dam in Zambia and Zimbabwe, which was the largest dam in the world when built and for which he was made a Companion of the Order of St Michael and St George. He was also involved with the Indus Basin Project, the Aswan High Dam, the Hendrik Verwoerd Dam, the P.K. Le Roux Dam, the Spioenkop Dam and the Tarbela Dam. Paton was knighted in 1973 and retired in 1977, remaining a senior consultant to Gibb and Partners. He spent his retirement in Jersey, where he died at St Helier on 7 April 1999. Paton was dedicated to his professional career and served as President of both the Institution of Civil Engineers (November 1970 – November 1971) and the Smeatonian Society of Civil Engineers.

== Early life ==
Angus, the name he preferred, was born on the island of Jersey in the Channel Islands on 10 May 1905. His father, Thomas Lyall Paton, was a journalist and author. His mother, Janet, was the daughter of Easton Gibb, founder of Easton Gibb & Son, a firm of civil engineering contractors. His uncle on his mother's side, Alexander Gibb, was also a civil engineer and had founded Sir Alexander Gibb & Partners, where Paton would spend his professional career. Paton left Jersey with his family in 1909 and spent a year in England before being sent to school in Boulogne-sur-Mer in France then Lausanne in Switzerland. He returned to England at the outbreak of the First World War in 1914. He spent the next six years living in St Leonards-on-Sea in Sussex where he lived next door to his future wife, Joan Delme-Murray.

Paton spent four years at Brunswick preparatory school in Haywards Heath, Sussex before studying at Cheltenham College. He was a good student, which he put down to an excellent maths teacher, a good memory and being "not much good at games". On Alexander Gibb's advice Paton read for a degree in civil engineering at University College London (UCL), where he had won a scholarship at the age of 17. Whilst at UCL Paton earned half-colours for long distance running and became the only student to graduate with a first class honours Bachelor of Science degree in engineering in 1925.

== Work ==
=== Post-graduation ===
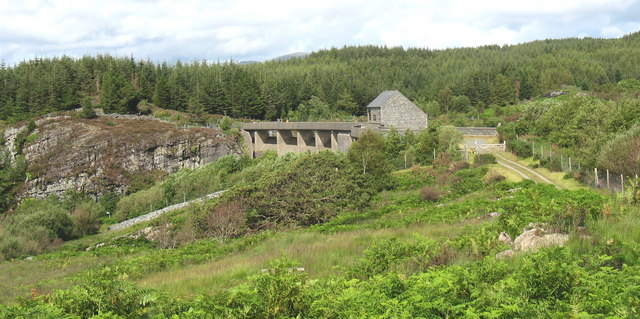
Maentwrog Dam

Upon graduation Paton joined Sir Alexander Gibb & Partners, which had been founded in 1922. One of his first jobs there was to assist with the design of a new jetty for Barking Power Station. In 1927 he worked on a dam at Maentwrog in North Wales and between 1932 and 1933 was resident engineer on the Glenlee portion of the Galloway hydro-electric power scheme. Paton was seconded to the Rangoon Port Trust in 1930 to construct a wharf for the export of lead from Burma. This wharf survived a serious earthquake on 5 May 1930 and was opened on 20 February 1931. On 10 April 1931 Paton sailed to Canada to undertake a survey of its ports and outline the additional facilities that would be required in the next 25–50 years. He was assisted in this for six weeks by Ralph Freeman who had designed the Sydney Harbour Bridge. The report was issued on 15 January 1932 but was not implemented until 1935 with the election of William Lyon Mackenzie King as Prime Minister of Canada. The report's findings continued to be in use until the 1970s. Paton was responsible for the construction of a new brewery for Guinness in Park Royal, London from October 1933 to October 1936. This was the biggest job of his career thus far and involved the construction of seven steel framed buildings, a power station, a storage silo, roads and railway sidings. Paton also built industrial and trading estates in Wales, West Cumberland and London. He was made a partner in the firm in 1938.

=== Second World War ===
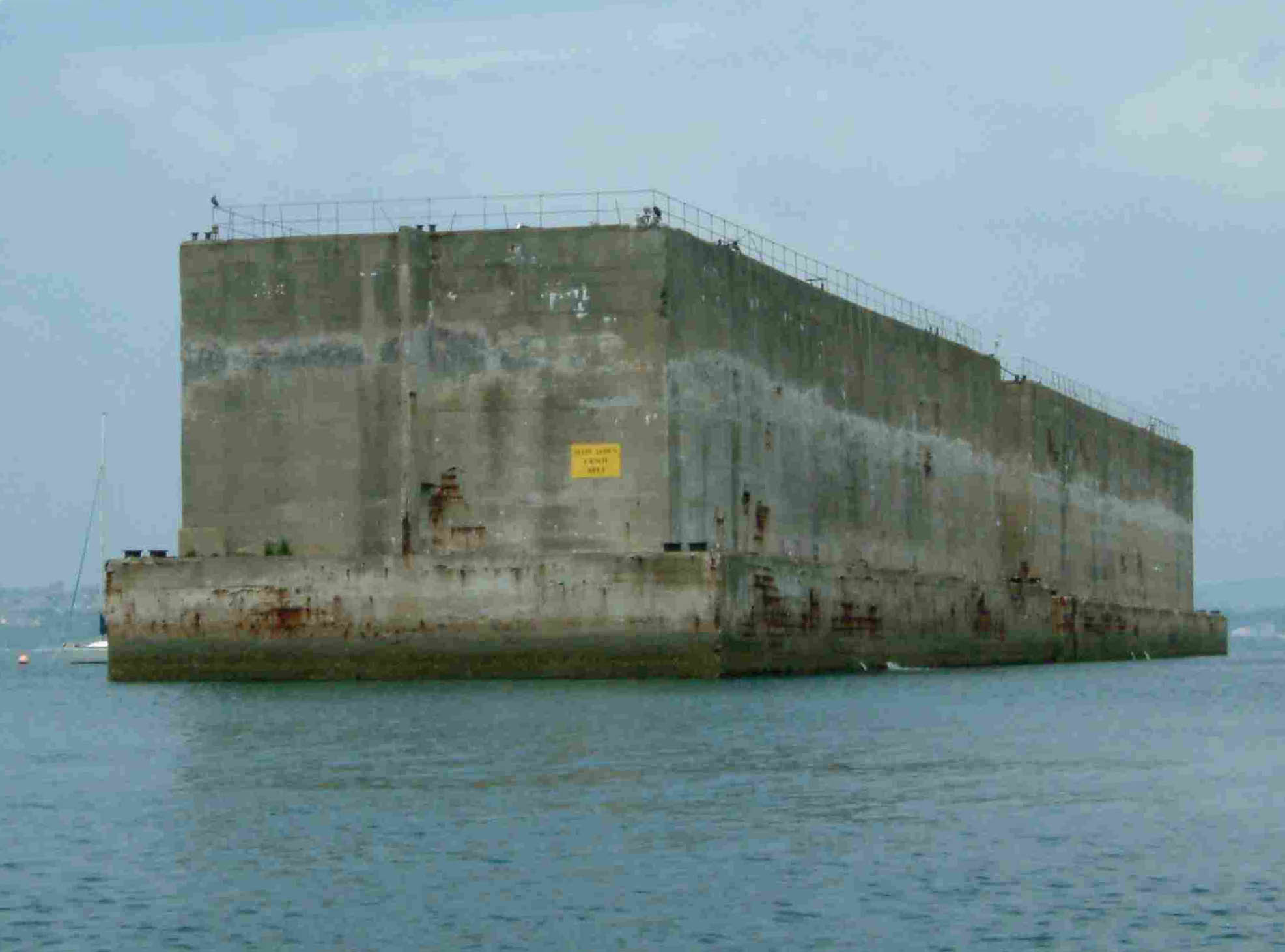
A caisson from one of the Mulberry harbours

During the Second World War the running of Gibb and Partners fell largely to Paton and James Guthrie Brown. Gibb and Partners gained a large number of government contracts and within a few weeks of the start of the war in September 1939 the workforce increased by 2000. Paton designed and sited several Royal Ordnance Factories and in March 1940 travelled to Turkey to construct an iron and steel works there. Whilst in Turkey he was contracted to build emplacements to contain guns from mothballed battleships in the Dardanelles. The construction of the emplacements was completed but the guns would later be prevented from reaching the site by the Axis occupation of Greece. Paton made his way back to Britain via Greece, Italy and France and arrived home two days prior to the Italian declaration of war against the Allies on 10 June 1940. He also constructed a plant at Barry in South Wales for the extraction of magnesium hydroxide from the sea, a turbine factory for British Thomson-Houston Company and a £7 million underground aircraft engine factory. From 1943–44 Paton supervised the construction, in London Docks, of the precast concrete caissons required for the construction of Mulberry Harbours following the Normandy Landings. From 1944–45 he was in charge of the rebuilding of houses damaged by V-2 rockets in the London districts of Wanstead and Woodford.

=== Post-war ===
In 1945 Paton began construction of a wool factory at Darlington and a Rayon factory at Carrickfergus, both jobs were completed in 1951. In 1946 Paton was put in charge of an economic survey of Syria which required him to traverse the country by aircraft and car. The report, issued in 1947, recommended port, water infrastructure and irrigation improvements and the construction of a hydroelectric power station on the Euphrates River. Paton undertook a similar survey in Lebanon from 1947 to 1948. He was also involved in a report on the possibility of running a railroad from Northern Rhodesia to Dar es Salaam, Mtwara and Nyasaland.

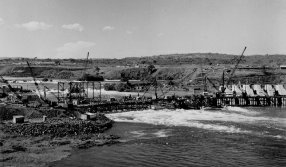
Owen Falls Dam under construction

Paton worked extensively in the field of hydroelectric power and became regarded as a world authority on the matter. From 1946 to 1955 he worked on the Owen Falls Hydroelectric Scheme in Uganda which resulted in the complete stoppage of the White Nile for the first time in history. Following the completion of Owen Falls Dam, Paton worked on the first stage of the Kariba Dam on the Zambezi River, of which he said that it was the "highlight of his professional career". Paton made 22 visits to the site, of a total duration of 267 days. The project itself was, at 420 ft high, the largest dam built until then and, despite some of the worst floods on record hitting the project, was completed in 1960 at £5 million under budget. In recognition of his work on the Kariba project Paton was made a Companion of the Order of St Michael and St George on 1 January 1960. As a result of the success of the Kariba project Gibb and Partners became involved with many of the biggest dam projects of the next two decades including works in Sudan, Argentina, South Africa and Pakistan.

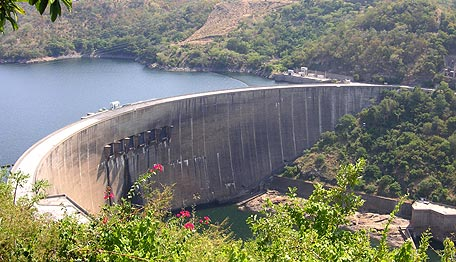
Kariba Dam

Paton was later involved in the second stage of the Kariba Project and in the Aswan High Dam project. In 1955 he became a senior partner in Sir Alexander Gibb & Partners upon the death of Alistair Gibb in a polo accident. From 1960 until 1977, when he retired, Paton was the responsible partner for the firm's involvement in the supervision of the $1.2 billion World Bank Indus Basin Project. This included the construction of the Mangla Dam between 1962 and 1968.

In 1962 Gibb & Partners was one of two firms chosen (with Coyne et Bellier) by the South African government to build two dams on the Orange River. The first to be constructed was the Hendrik Verwoerd Dam which was officially opened in March 1972. The second, the P.K. Le Roux Dam, was finished in 1977. Following the success of this project Paton was retained to build a third, smaller dam, the Spioenkop Dam, which was finished in 1972. Paton was also involved with the tunnelling and underground powerhouse for the Drakensberg Pumped Storage Scheme. Paton was retained by the World Bank once more in 1967 to supervise the construction of the Tarbela Dam in Pakistan, which was completed in 1976. He also worked on the modernisation of the Royal Mint which involved the move from its 600-year home at Tower Hill to Llantrisant in Wales in time for decimalisation in 1971.

== Retirement ==
Paton retired from the firm in 1977 but worked for them again as a senior consultant between 1979 and 1985. During this time he worked on the James Bay Project, a large hydroelectric and infrastructure development in Quebec, Canada. Paton spent the last twenty years of his life in retirement in Jersey in the Channel Islands. In his working life he had visited 48 countries and spent 3152 days abroad. During his career with Gibb and Partners he had grown the company from a 400 employee, home-based company to one which employed more than 1500 engineers working in 63 countries. He was also largely responsible for leading the trend of exporting British technical expertise around the world.

Paton made an endowment to the Royal Academy of Engineering in 1986, as a result the Academy awards the Sir Angus Paton Bursary of £7000 annually to a masters student. Paton married on 7 June 1933 to Joan with whom he raised two daughters and two sons. Joan died on 7 January 1964, an event which spurred him to become more involved in his profession. Paton died at St Helier in Jersey on 7 April 1999.

== Personal life ==
Paton married Eleanor Joan Delmé-Murray on 7 June 1933, they remained married until her death at the age of 53 in 1964. They had two sons and two daughters.

== Professional recognition ==
=== Institutional and committee memberships ===
In addition to his busy work schedule Paton served his profession on numerous councils and committees. The first of these was as chairman of the Association of Consulting Engineers between 1949 and 1950, an association of which he was made an honorary member in 1984. Paton served on the council of the Institution of Civil Engineers from 1954 to 1959 and again from 1961 to 1966. He was elected vice president of that institution, a position he filled from 1966 to 1970 when he was elected president. Whilst serving as president he started New Civil Engineer magazine to keep members up to date with civil engineering news.

From 1960 to 1965 Paton was a board member of the Hydraulics Research Station of the Department of Scientific and Industrial Research and from 1964 to 1975 he served on the council of the Construction Industry Research and Information Association. Paton was also the British representative on the committee of the International Commission on Large Dams between 1966 and 1973. From 1968 to 1970 he was chairman of the National Economic Development Council's working party on large industrial construction sites and from 1969 to 1974 was a member of the Natural Environment Research Council. Paton was vice-chairman of the Council of Engineering Institutions from 1971 to 1972 and chairman for 1972 to 1973. From 1974 to 1979 he was chairman of the Ministry of Agriculture, Fisheries and Food flood protection research committee. Paton was also a member emeritus of the Smeatonian Society of Civil Engineers and served as their president in 1980.

=== Other honours ===
Paton was awarded many honours for his contributions to civil engineering. In 1952 he was made an honorary fellow of University College London and he was also a fellow of the Institution of Structural Engineers and the American Society of Civil Engineers. Paton was made a fellow of the Royal Society in 1969 and served as one of its vice-presidents for the 1977–78 session. Paton became one of the few practising engineers to have held that post.

He was created a knight bachelor in the Queen's Birthday Honours of 1973 in recognition of his services to the construction industry. This knighthood was personally conferred upon him by Queen Elizabeth II on 7 November 1973. In 1976 Paton became a founding member of the Fellowship of Engineering and received an honorary Doctorate of Science (DSc) in engineering from the University of London in 1977. In 1978 he was made an honorary fellow of Imperial College London and received another honorary DSc in engineering from Bristol University.

Professional and academic associations
Preceded by Angus Fulton	President of the Institution of Civil Engineers; November 1970 – November 1971	Succeeded by George Ambler Wilson
