= Gainsborough, Ipswich =

Human settlement in Ipswich

Coordinates: 52.0332°N 1.1792°E

Gainsborough
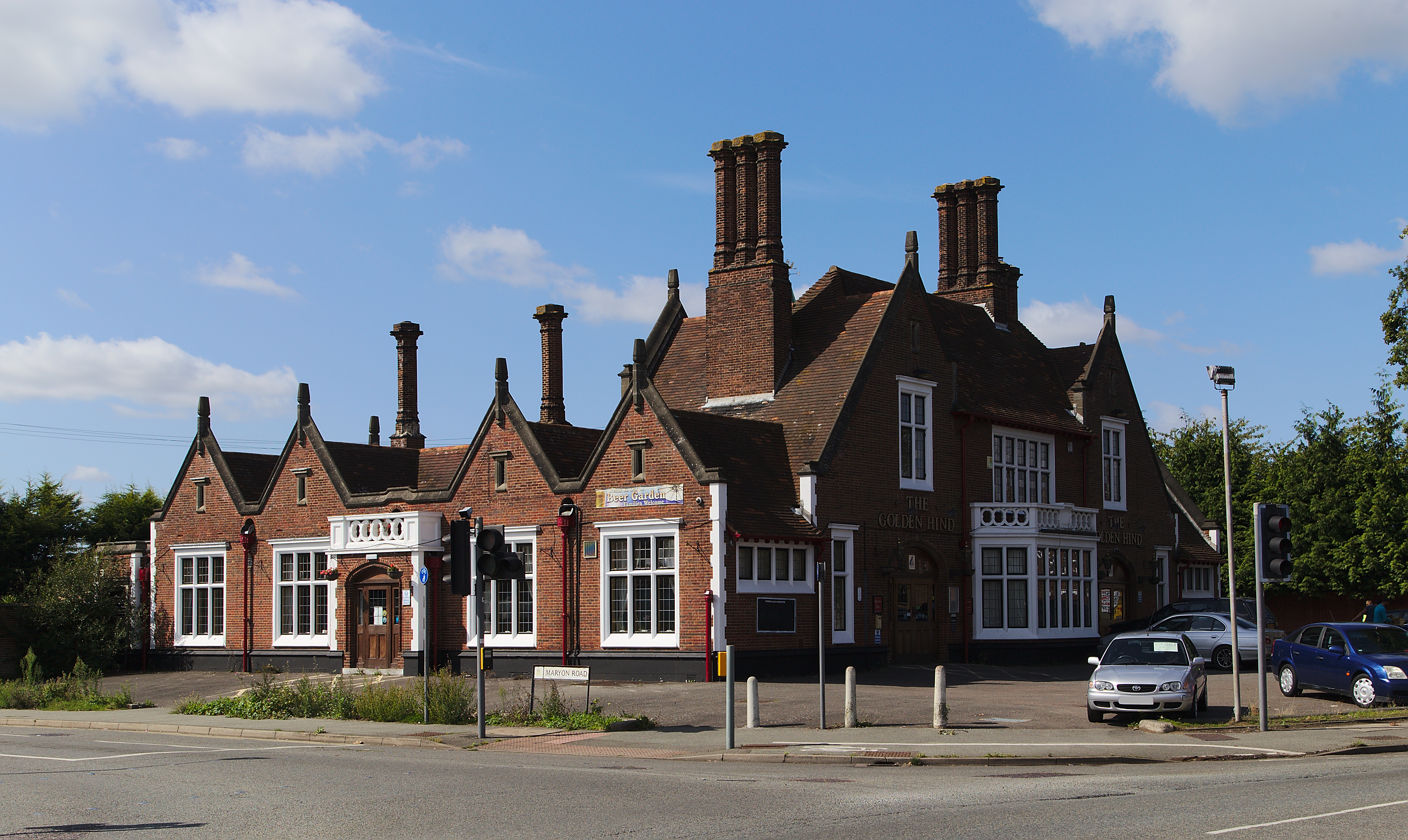
- The Golden Hind, one of the Tolly Follies, built in the 1930s to serve the people of Gainsborough

- Location within Suffolk
- District: Ipswich
- Shire county: Suffolk
- Region: East
- Country: England
- Sovereign state: United Kingdom
- Postcode district: IP3

Gainsborough (/ˈɡeɪnzbərə/) is an area of Ipswich, in the Ipswich district, in the county of Suffolk, England. It was named after the artist Thomas Gainsborough of Sudbury, who lived in Ipswich for several years. He was noted for visiting the banks of the Orwell in this area.

== History ==
The construction of Gainsborough, Ipswich, started in 1926. It continued through the 1930s. Once completed, Gainsborough was home to two story detached and semi detached homes, as well as Ipswich Power Station and Orwell Country Park. In 2008–09, Suffolk County Council built a library on Clapgate Lane, Ipswich.

== Gainsborough Lane ==
Gainsborough Lane is a rural road in Gainsborough. It is noted for its stunning scenery and its use in art. It was used by Thomas Gainsborough for a magnificent art piece.

== Gainsborough Estate ==
The estate was a public housing development whose construction was started in 1926 and continued into the 1930s. It comprises largely of two storey terraced and semi-detached dwellings. The road layout is a hybrid of both grids and spoke and wheel plan.

== Gainsborough Library ==
In 2008-9 Suffolk County Council built a new library on the site of the previous library located in Clapgate Lane. This is a steel frame structure with decorative stainless steel circular cladding around an atrium entrance. The building won the RIBA East 'Spirit of Ingenuity' award.

=== The library under construction ===
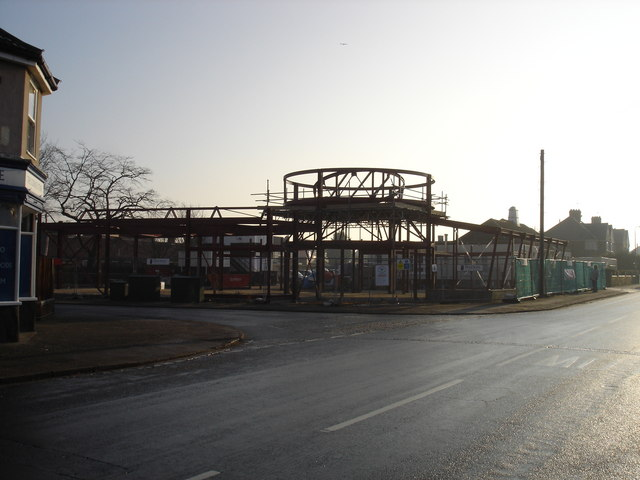
30 December 2008

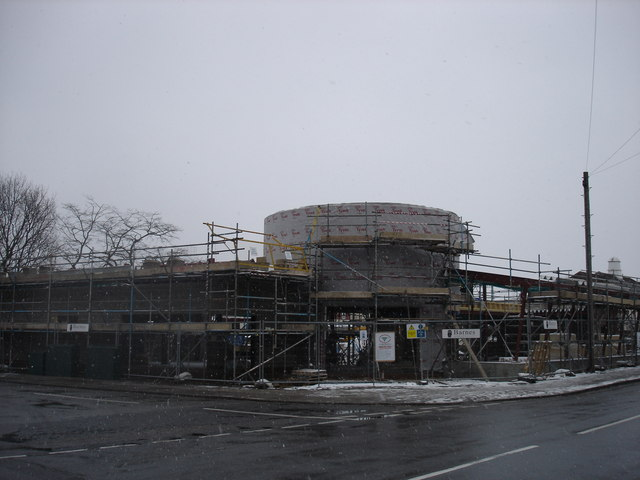
2 February 2009

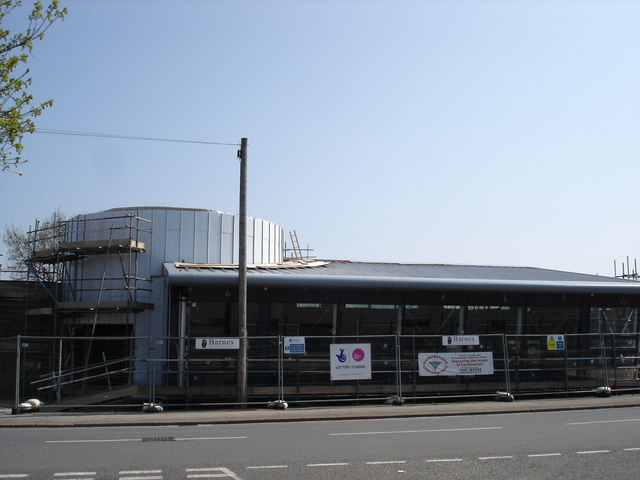
19 April 2009

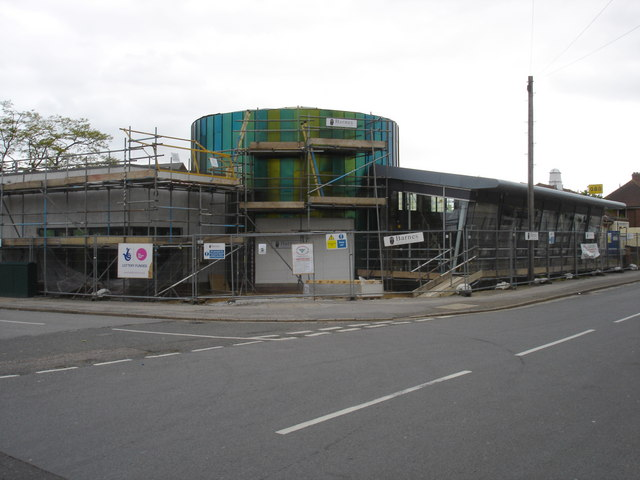
7 May 2009

== Gainsborough Ward ==
Gainsborough Ward is one of the sixteen wards which compose Ipswich Borough. It elects three councillors. The ward also includes the neighbouring area of Greenwich.

== Gainsborough Sports Centre ==
Gainsborough Sports Centre is a Sports Centre in Gainsborough, Ipswich, England. It is home to many gym facilities and a COVID-19 vaccination centre. It is located on Braziers Wood Rood.

== See also ==
- Leighton Road Evangelical Church, Ipswich
