= Loch Enoch =

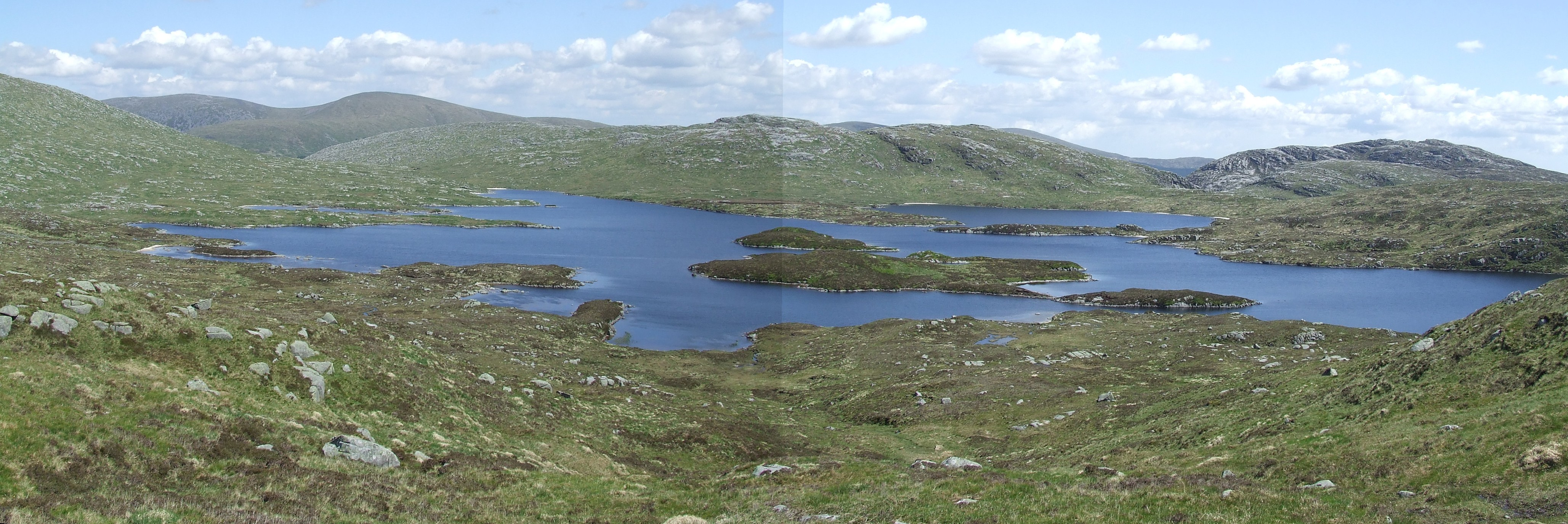
- With Corserine, Dungeon Hill and Craignaw in the background

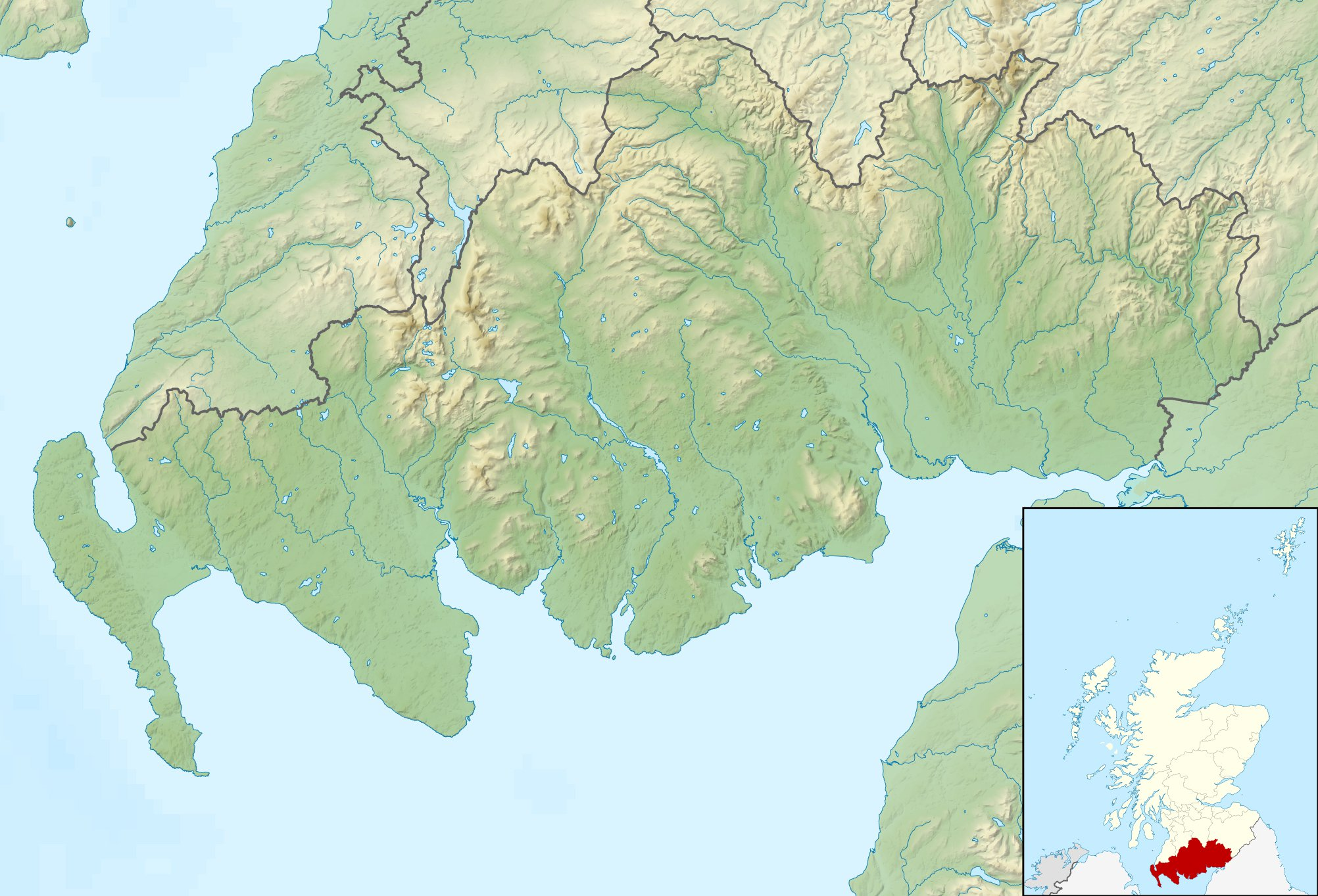
- Location within Dumfries and Galloway
- Location: Galloway
- Coordinates: 55°08′10″N 4°26′20″W
- Type: Loch
- Primary outflows: Eglin Lane
- Catchment area: 186 ha (460 acres)
- Basin countries: Scotland
- Surface area: 50 ha (120 acres)
- Max. depth: ~36 m (118 ft)
- Surface elevation: 493 m (1,617 ft)

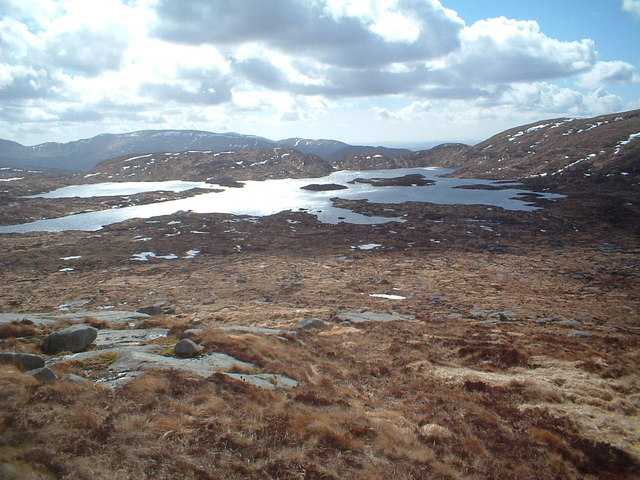
Loch Enoch viewed from the slopes of Mullwharchar

Loch Enoch is a multi-basin freshwater loch in Galloway, to the east of Merrick and south of Mullwharchar. The loch is situated in a granite basin and has several small islands and some beaches on its shore. The sharp granite sand of these beaches was collected and sold for sharpening knives and scythes. The catchment area's vegetation is mainly Purple Moor Grass and Heather.

The loch's outflow supplies Loch Doon and the River Doon, both in Ayrshire.

== Acidification ==
By 1800 the water of Loch Enoch had already become acidic. J. McBain in his 1929 book The Merrick and the Neighbouring Hills. Tramps by Hill, Stream and Loch describes a trout that 'bore the unmistakable marks of a Loch Enoch trout, i.e. it was minus the lower half of its tail and part of its ventral fins'. McBain writes that the last recorded trout caught was in 1899. Since 1940 the loch became more acidic due to industrial emissions and in the 1950s it completely lost its fish population. In 1994 it was restocked with 3000 trout. The loch has not become more acidic since the mid-1970s and has become slightly less acidic from the 1980s onwards, with the pH increasing slowly from around 4.3 in 1978 to 4.9 in 2003. Between 1983 and 2003 the loch's DOC levels increased.

== Water analysis ==
Concentrations of different elements in samples from June 2006
Element	Concentration μg/L
CaCO_{3}	−500
Li	0.297
Al	83.9
V	0.263
Cr	0.147
Fe	49.3
Fe DRC	46.4
Mn	6.7
Co	0.064
Ni	0.348
Cu	0.247
Zn	3.14
Se	0.178

It is considered relatively oligotrophic.
