= Hugh Beaver =

British engineer and businessman (1890–1967)

Sir Hugh Beaver KBE
- Born: Hugh Eyre Campbell Beaver; 4 May 1890; Johannesburg, South Africa
- Died: 16 January 1967 (aged 76); London, England
- Resting place: Holy Trinity Church, Penn Street
- Education: Wellington College, Berkshire
- Occupations: Engineer, industrialist
- Years active: 1931–1960
- Board member of: The Guinness Book of World Records, Guinness Brewery

Sir Hugh Eyre Campbell Beaver, KBE (4 May 1890 – 16 January 1967) was an English-South African civil engineer, industrialist and bureaucrat, who founded the Guinness World Records (then known as Guinness Book of Records). He was Director-General of the Ministry of Works and managing director at Guinness Brewery.

== Biography ==
Beaver was born on 4 May 1890 in Johannesburg, South Africa. He was educated at Wellington College, Berkshire.

Beaver spent two years in the Indian police from 1910 and returned to England in 1921, joining the civil engineering firm Sir Alexander Gibb & Partners, as the personal assistant of Sir Alexander Gibb. Upon the request of Canadian Prime Minister R. B. Bennett, he led a mission to Canada developing Canadian harbours. He directed the reconstruction of the harbour of Saint John in New Brunswick after it was destroyed by a fire in 1931. He then became partner at Sir Alexander Gibb & Partners, and worked mainly on factory building and the re-industrialisation of depressed areas in the UK.

During World War II he was Director-General in the newly formed Ministry of Works, and was in charge of the whole wartime programme of works.

Beaver was knighted in 1943. After the war, he was a member of the New Towns Committee.

=== At Guinness ===
Beaver joined Arthur Guinness Son & Co. (Guinness Brewery) in 1945 as assistant managing director. He was appointed managing director in November 1946. The brewery was modernised and the company's interests were widened under his direction.

=== Air pollution work and later life ===
After the Great Smog of 1952 Beaver was appointed as chair of the Committee on Air Pollution, known as the Beaver Committee, investigating the severe air pollution problem in London. In 1954 the committee reported results which led to effective action, in part due to a shift in public opinion.

He was Chairman of the Committee on Power Station Construction between 1952–1953, Chairman of the British Institute of Management between 1951–1954, Chairman of the Advisory Council of the Department of Scientific and Industrial Research between 1954–1956, and President of the Federation of British Industries in 1957. He was also Director of the Colonial Development Corporation.

Beaver was made Knight Commander of the Order of the British Empire in 1956.

He was President of the Royal Statistical Society between 1959–1960.

Beaver died of heart failure in London, United Kingdom on 16 January 1967.

== Honours ==
- Knight Bachelor (1943)
- Knight Commander of the Order of the British Empire (1956)
