= Ballochling Loch =

Mountain loch in East Ayrshire, Scotland

- Ballochling Loch, from its northwest shore

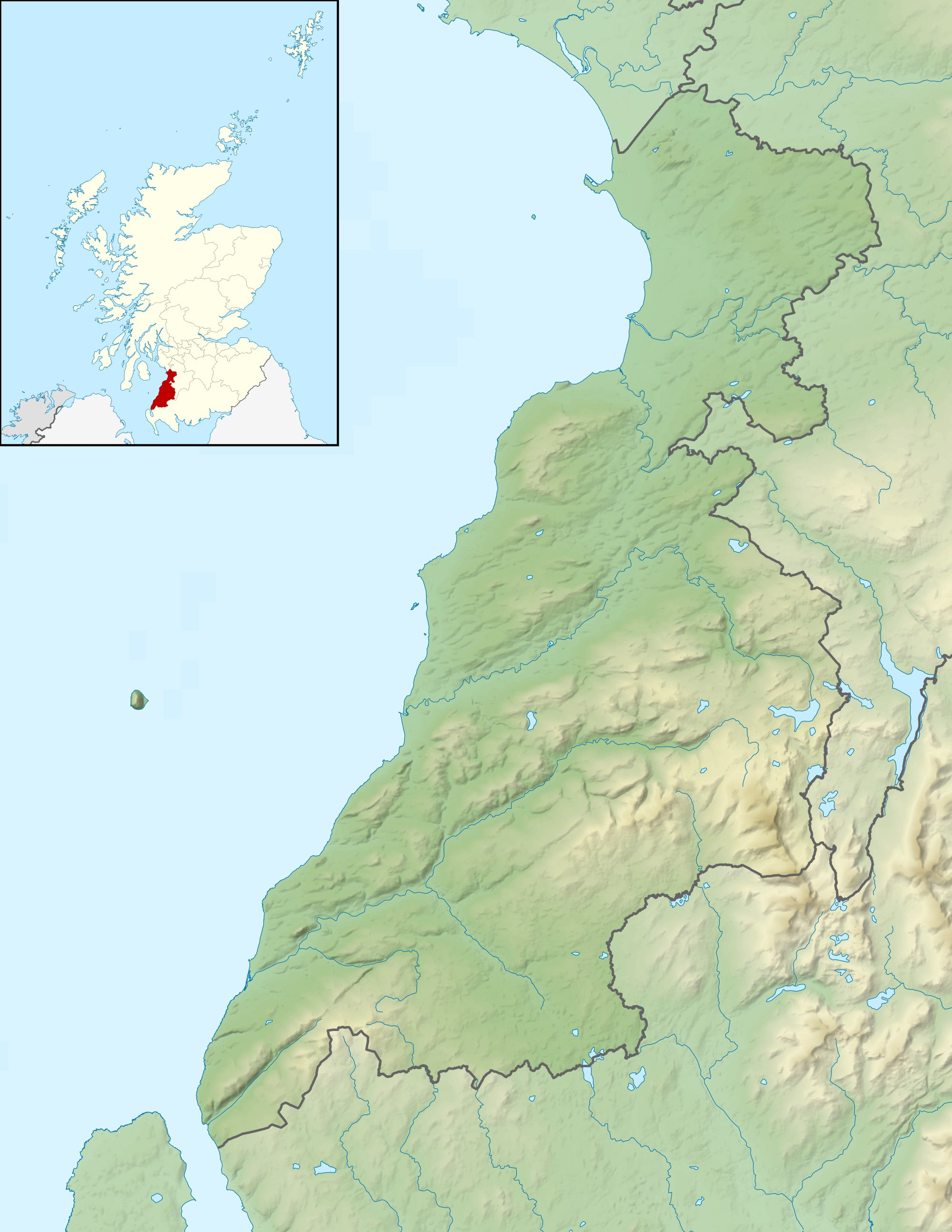
- Location within South Ayrshire
- Location: Ayrshire
- Coordinates: 55°13′21″N 4°25′53″W
- Basin countries: Scotland, United Kingdom
- Max. length: 432 m (1,417 ft)
- Max. width: 305 m (1,001 ft)
- Surface elevation: 346 m (1,135 ft)

Ballochling Loch is a remote mountain lochan (small loch) in East Ayrshire, Scotland, situated on the border of the Carrick Forest. The nearest settlement to it is Carsphairn, a village 6.1 miles (9.8 km) east, on the other side of the much larger Loch Doon.

Ballochling Loch is itself a tributary of Loch Doon, flowing into it via Whitespout Linn, the source of which begins in nearby Loch Riecawr.

Like the village of Balloch in West Dunbartonshire, the loch's name may derive from the Scottish Gaelic bealach, meaning "pass", and some other Gaelic element; possibly lèanag ("wet plain") or linn ("pool, pond"), i.e., 'Loch of the Pass of the Wet Plain', or 'Loch of the Pass of the Pool'.

In his seminal Bathymetrical Survey of the Scottish Fresh-water Lochs (1910), John Murray observed the loch's main plant species to be bottle sedge, bog pondweed, and buttercups. Ballochling is also a recorded location for fishing brown trout.
