= Guy Maunsell =

Irish engineer (1884–1961)

Guy Anson Maunsell (1 September 1884 – 20 June 1961) was the British civil engineer responsible for the design of the Maunsell Forts used by the United Kingdom for the defence of the Thames and Mersey estuaries during World War II.

== Early life ==
Maunsell was born in 1884 in Srinagar, Kashmir in British India, one of three children of a military family. His father, Edward Henry Maunsell (1837–1913) was of Anglo-Irish ancestry, and was a captain in the 5th Dragoon Guards and 15th Hussars. His mother, Rosalie Harriet Anson (1852–1922), was born in Guernsey; the couple had married in Bombay Cathedral in 1878. He was related distantly to General Sir Frederick Richard Maunsell (1828–1916) of the Royal Bengal Engineers. Young Guy was sent to school in England at Eastbourne College between 1897 and 1903, and studied civil engineering at the Central Institution of the City & Guilds of London Institute, South Kensington.

Although he graduated with first class honours in 1906, he did not find immediate employment and travelled the country making watercolour paintings. The next year, he became an assistant to Swiss engineer Adrien Palaz (1863–1930), professor of Industrial Electricity at the University of Lausanne, where he learned the latest techniques associated with reinforced concrete. In 1909 he secured a job with Easton Gibb & Son who were engaged in the construction of the Rosyth Dockyard. In July 1914, Maunsell moved to R. Thorburn and Sons as their chief agent and was responsible for building two TNT factories for the British Government.

== World War I ==
In 1917, Maunsell was conscripted as a commissioned officer in the Royal Engineers and spent a year on the Western Front. Recalled to England, he worked as chief engineer at John Ver Mehr's yard in Shoreham, engaged with the construction of concrete tugs and barges known as the Shoreham Creteships. He was also involved with the concrete and steel towers for the Admiralty M-N Scheme, which were intended to close the Strait of Dover to U-boats. A single tower remains today as the lighthouse Nab Tower.

In 1955 he founded the business G. Maunsell & Partners in the United Kingdom which pioneered the use of pre-stressed concrete for major bridges. The Hammersmith Flyover, completed in 1961, made early use of this new construction method and many more such structures followed. The company expanded to Australia, Hong Kong and the Middle East and in time merged with Oscar Faber & Partners to form Faber Maunsell, and ultimately became part of the US-based AECOM Group.

He died at Tunbridge Wells, Kent, England on 20 June 1961.
