= Greenwich, Ipswich =

Coordinates: 52.037°N 1.17°E

Greenwich is a suburban area of Ipswich, in the Ipswich district, in the county of Suffolk, England. For many years it was a hamlet included in the parish of St Clement's and thus was part of the Ipswich Corporation from the time of its creation in 1200.

== Prominent buildings in Greenwich ==
- Cliff Quay Power Station (commissioned 1949, demolished 1994)
