= Robert Scott Steedman =

British engineer and standardizer

- Born: 10 September 1958 (age 67); Scotland
- Education: Manchester University, UK; Cambridge University, UK
- Awards: Commander of the Order of the British Empire (CBE) for services to engineering 2010; US Government Outstanding Civilian Service Medal 2007; Lord Lloyd of Kilgerran Award from the Foundation of Science and Technology 2007
- Scientific career
- Fields: International Standards, Civil Engineering, Geotechnical Engineering
- Workplaces: Cambridge University, UK; BSI Group

Robert Scott Steedman (born 10 September 1958) is a British engineer, former academic, TV presenter and standards expert. He is currently Director-General, Standards at BSI Group, the UK's national standards body.

== Education ==
Son of Robert Russell Steedman, Scottish architect and partner of Morris and Steedman Architects, and Susan Elizabeth Sym, Steedman was educated at the Edinburgh Academy from 1963 to 1976. He read civil and structural engineering at Manchester University (UMIST) gaining a BSc Hons (1st Class) in 1980. He went on to Cambridge University (Queens’ College) where he was awarded an MPhil degree in soil mechanics in 1981. He continued his research at St Catharine's College, Cambridge and was awarded a PhD degree in 1984 for his work on the effects of earthquakes on retaining walls.

== Early career ==
Steedman was appointed as a lecturer in engineering at the University of Cambridge and elected a fellow of St Catharine’s College, Cambridge in 1983. His research focus was geotechnical earthquake engineering, studying problems of liquefaction and soil-structure interaction using the centrifuge facility in the Department of Engineering to build and test scale models of walls, dams, levees and foundations using simulated earthquake shaking under high acceleration fields.

Later with Andrew Schofield, Steedman commissioned a large centrifuge facility in 1995 in Vicksburg, Mississippi for the US Army Corps of Engineers' Engineer Research and Development Center designed to be used for similar civil engineering related research purposes. He visited the Mexico earthquake disaster in 1985 and the Loma Prieta earthquake in 1989.

Steedman joined earthquake and risk consultants BEQE in 1990, moving to Sir Alexander Gibb & Partners (later Law Gibb, now Jacobs) in 1993 where he became Director of Engineering. He worked on major infrastructure projects in the UK and around the world. In 1998, Steedman wrote and presented a 13-episode documentary television series, How Did They Build That? for Ideal World Productions and the Discovery Channel and later contributed to many other documentaries on ancient engineering.

During the 2000s Steedman worked for structural engineers Whitbybird and then as an independent consultant and forensic engineering expert. He participated in the federal investigation into the Hurricane Katrina disaster in New Orleans in 2005.

== Current career ==
In 2012 Steedman joined BSI Group. He is Director-General, Standards and an executive director. He was a vice president of the European Committee for Standardization (CEN) from 2012 – 2016 and vice president for policy of the International Organization for Standardization(ISO) from 2017 – 2021. He is currently serving as an elected member of the International Electrotechnical Commission (IEC) Board.

== Recognition ==
Steedman was elected a fellow of the Institution of Civil Engineers (ICE) in 2001 and served as a vice president from 2005 to 2009. He was elected a fellow of the Royal Academy of Engineering (RAEng) in 2001 and served as a vice president from 2003 to 2009. He was editor in chief of the Royal Academy’s magazine, Ingenia, from 2004 to 2021.

He was president of the European Council for Construction Research, Development & Innovation (ECCREDI) from 1997 to 2008. He was a non-executive member of the board of the Port of London Authority (PLA ) from 2009 to 2015 and a non-executive director of the board of Thomas Telford Ltd, commercial subsidiary of the ICE from 1999 to 2009 (chairman from 2003 to 2007). In 2007 he received the US Government Outstanding Civilian Service Medal for his work on the Hurricane Katrina investigation and the Lord Lloyd of Kilgerran Award from the Foundation of Science and Technology for the application of science and technology for society. Steedman was appointed Commander of the Order of the British Empire (CBE) in 2010 for services to engineering.

== Publications ==
Steedman has authored and contributed to numerous technical publications and books, including:

- Regulatory Delivery, (2019) Bloomsbury (contrib)
- Iai S and Steedman R S, (2013) Introduction to English for Global Communication of Civil and Environmental Engineering, Corona Publishing, Tokyo
- Steedman R S and Sharp M, (2011) Physical Modelling Analysis of the New Orleans Levee Breaches, Proc. ICE Geotechnical Engineering, December (ICE Crampton Prize, 2012 )
- Land Subsidence, Special Volume, (2005) Multi-disciplinary assessment of subsidence phenomena in the Ravenna area, Millpress (ed, contrib)
- Seismic Design Guidelines for Port Structures, (2001) AA Balkema (contrib)
- Steedman R S, (1998) Seismic design of retaining walls, Proc ICE, Geotechnical Engineering, 131, pp 12–22, January (Winner of ICE TK Hsieh Award, 1999)
- Zeng X and Steedman R S, (1993) On the behaviour of quay walls in earthquakes. Géotechnique 43, No.3, pp 417–431, September
- Steedman R S and Zeng X, (1990) The influence of phase on the calculation of pseudo-static earth pressure on a retaining wall, Géotechnique 40, No 1, 103-112, March
