= Sir Alexander Gibb & Partners =

British firm of consulting civil engineers

- Type: Private
- Industry: Civil engineering
- Founded: 1922
- Founder: Sir Alexander Gibb
- Defunct: 2001
- Fate: Acquired by Jacobs Engineering Group following ownership by Law Engineering and Environmental Services
- Successor: Jacobs Engineering Group
- Headquarters: Reading, Berkshire, England
- Key people: Sir Alexander Gibb (founder)
- Products: Engineering consulting services
- Services: Civil engineering, structural engineering, transportation engineering, water engineering, hydroelectric engineering, project management, architecture
- Owner: Law Engineering and Environmental Services (1989–2001)

Sir Alexander Gibb & Partners was a British firm of consulting civil engineers, founded in 1922 by Sir Alexander Gibb, and initially headquartered in London before moving west to Reading in Berkshire in 1974 to the former site of Suttons Seeds. In 1989, the firm merged with Atlanta, Georgia-based Law Engineering and Environmental Services. In 2001 Law sold the Gibb business to another US-based firm, Jacobs Engineering Group.

== History ==
The firm had been founded in 1922 by Scottish civil engineer, Brigadier-General Sir Alexander Gibb, whom was President of the Institution of Civil Engineers in 1936.

For the first ten years the business was not very rewarding financially although it was engaged on several important projects. Gibb and his colleague, noted electrical engineer Charles Hesterman Merz, designed Barking Power Station and later (between 1930 and 1936), the modernist power stations of the Galloway hydro-electric power scheme, the first major work of its kind to be linked to the National Grid. The firm also worked on Maentwrog New Dam in Wales (1928).

In 1936, it designed the Kincardine Bridge across the Firth of Forth, then Britain's largest road bridge.

In 1937, the firm designed the Capper Pass and Son smelting works (as well as a row of houses) in Hull.

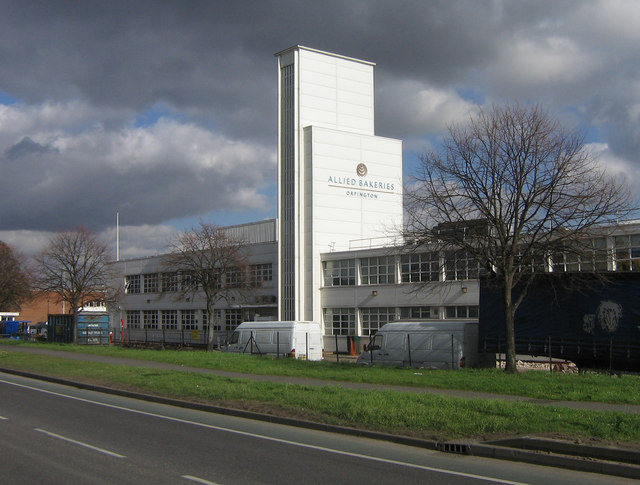
Allied Bakeries, St Pauls Cray, London and its art deco inspired tower.

In 1939, Gibb designed the new Allied Bakeries building, in St Pauls Cray (near Orpington). Originally the Tip Top Bakery in Cray Avenue, it is now part of the Allied Bakeries division of Associated British Foods.

From 1939 Sir Alexander Gibb & Partners designed three large ordnance factories (including ROF Swynnerton) for the Ministry of Supply; three other smaller factories followed later. Also during World War II, the Drakelow Tunnels near Kidderminster were designed and constructed.

In 1949, Cliff Quay Power Station in Suffolk was designed. In 1954, the firm completed the Owen Falls Dam in Uganda.

In 1967, it started working on the Cerros Colorados Complex in Argentina, provided design and construction management until its completion in 1979.

Between 1967 and 1970 Sir Alexander Gibb & Partners designed Baghdad International Airport.

In 1968, Sir Alexander Gibb & Partners was joint consulting engineer on the Cleddau Bridge in Wales.

Other later works included the Tripoli International Airport (1978), Devonport Dockyard, Limehouse Link tunnel (1989-1993), Great Man-Made River Project in Libya and several defence and airport projects in the Middle East, and several hydro-electric dam projects including the design and supervision of Tongariro Hydroelectric Scheme in New Zealand, the Lar Dam in Iran, Victoria Dam in Sri Lanka (1975-1985), and the Samanalawewa Dam project also in Sri Lanka (1993). Problems emerged on the Samanalawewa project and two years after its completion, its reservoir still could not be filled because its base was leaking. One Sri Lankan geologist has warned: "Samanalawewa is a write off". Also, the Victoria Dam in Sri Lanka has not produced the amount of energy envisaged by the designer.

By the late 1980s/early 1990s, the firm was organised as a number of specialised departments in Reading, namely Water and Energy (WAE), Transportation and Marine (TAM), Structures and Services (SAS), Project Management Services (PMS) and Gibb Architects. Outside of the United Kingdom, the firm had associated practices including Gibb Africa (headquartered in Nairobi, Kenya), Gibb Botswana (operating from Gaborone), Gibb Petermuller (headquartered in Athens) and Gibb Mauritius.

In the UK, the firm worked on Waterloo International Railway Terminal between 1988 and 1993, with Grimshaw Architects and Bovis Construction (as the main contractors), Brook House in Park Lane in London (with Squire and Partners), Reading Crown Court, and HM Prison High Down, Surrey.

In 1989, the firm merged with the larger American company, Law Engineering and Environmental Services, based in Atlanta, Georgia.

In June 1994, GibbAnglian, a partnership created by Sir Alexander Gibb and Partners and Anglian Water International, won a two-year contract from the United Kingdom Government's Overseas Development Administration to study the impact of industrial effluent in the city of Tianjin in China. The partnership's task was to investigate the technical, institutional, environmental, and financial issues involved in reducing industrial wastewater production and improving the quality of effluent discharges. In 1997, remedial works were carried out on Owen Falls dam under supervision by the consulting firm.

American parent Law sold Gibb to the US-based Jacobs Engineering Group in February 2001.

== Notable engineers ==
- Wilfrid Cracroft Ash (1884–1968), following the outbreak of WWII in 1939, became a consultant to Sir Alexander Gibb & Partners.
- Sir Hugh Beaver (1890–1967) was a British engineer, industrialist, and founder of the Guinness Book of Records.
- John Britten (1950–1995), mechanical engineer, worked briefly on the design of the highway linking the M1 motorway to the M4 motorway.
- Brigadier-General Sir Alexander Gibb, GBE, CB, FRS (1872–1958), founded Sir Alexander Gibb and Partners in 1921
- Sir Angus Paton (1905–1999), civil engineer who worked on several hydro-electric dam projects across the world and became a partner of the firm in 1955.
- Pat Reid (1910–1990), working for Sir Alexander Gibb & Partners from 1934 to 1937.
- Sir Leopold Halliday Savile, KCB, MICE (1870–1953) was a Scottish civil engineer who specialised in the design and construction of reservoirs. He served as President of the Institution of Civil Engineers between November 1940 and November 1941.
- Robert Scott Steedman (b. 1958), joined Gibb in 1993 and was director of engineering
- Howard Taylor (1940–2016), structural engineer who joined Sir Alexander Gibb & Partners in 1961, and supervised piling works at Tilbury B and West Thurrock power stations.

== Location ==
The firm was based at Queen Anne's Lodge, Queen Anne's Gate and subsequently Telford House, Tothill Street, Westminster, London, until 1974, when it relocated to Earley House, 427 London Road, Reading, Berkshire. which was also referred to as Gibb House.
