= Leighton Road Evangelical Church, Ipswich =

Church in Ipswich, UK

Coordinates: 52.0301°N 1.1793°E

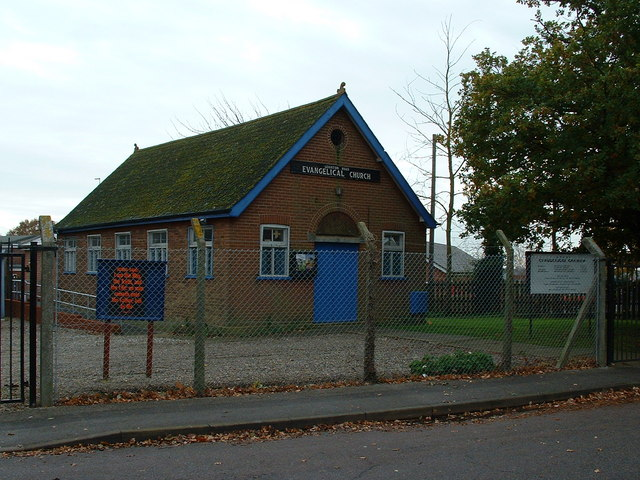
The church in 2006

Leighton Road Evangelical Church is a nonconformist independent evangelical church located on the Gainsborough estate, Ipswich in the English county of Suffolk.

Gainsborough estate is an urban priority area council housing estate on the south east side of Ipswich.

The church building was erected on land bought from Ipswich Borough Council in 1935. Of local interest is a large oak tree, around 400 years old, at the front of the church. Although the tree does not currently have a Tree Preservation Order on it, it is believed locally to have been used by 19th century Suffolk heroine Margaret Catchpole to harness her horse to, on occasions.

The church consists on one main chapel building of the mid-1930s which has recently been extended at the back with a small Sunday school room and disabled toilet added. It is not currently a listed building.

The church was previously known as Gainsborough Evangelical Free Church and Leighton Road Baptist Church, and is the only place of worship situated within the Gainsborough estate itself. The church has recently joined the Fellowship of Independent Evangelical Churches. The current trustees of the church are FIEC Ltd.

The church is governed as an independent Baptist church, with pastor and deacons. The current pastor is Brian Langston.
