= Nab Tower =

Anti-submarine tower off the Isle of Wight, England

Nab Tower Lighthouse
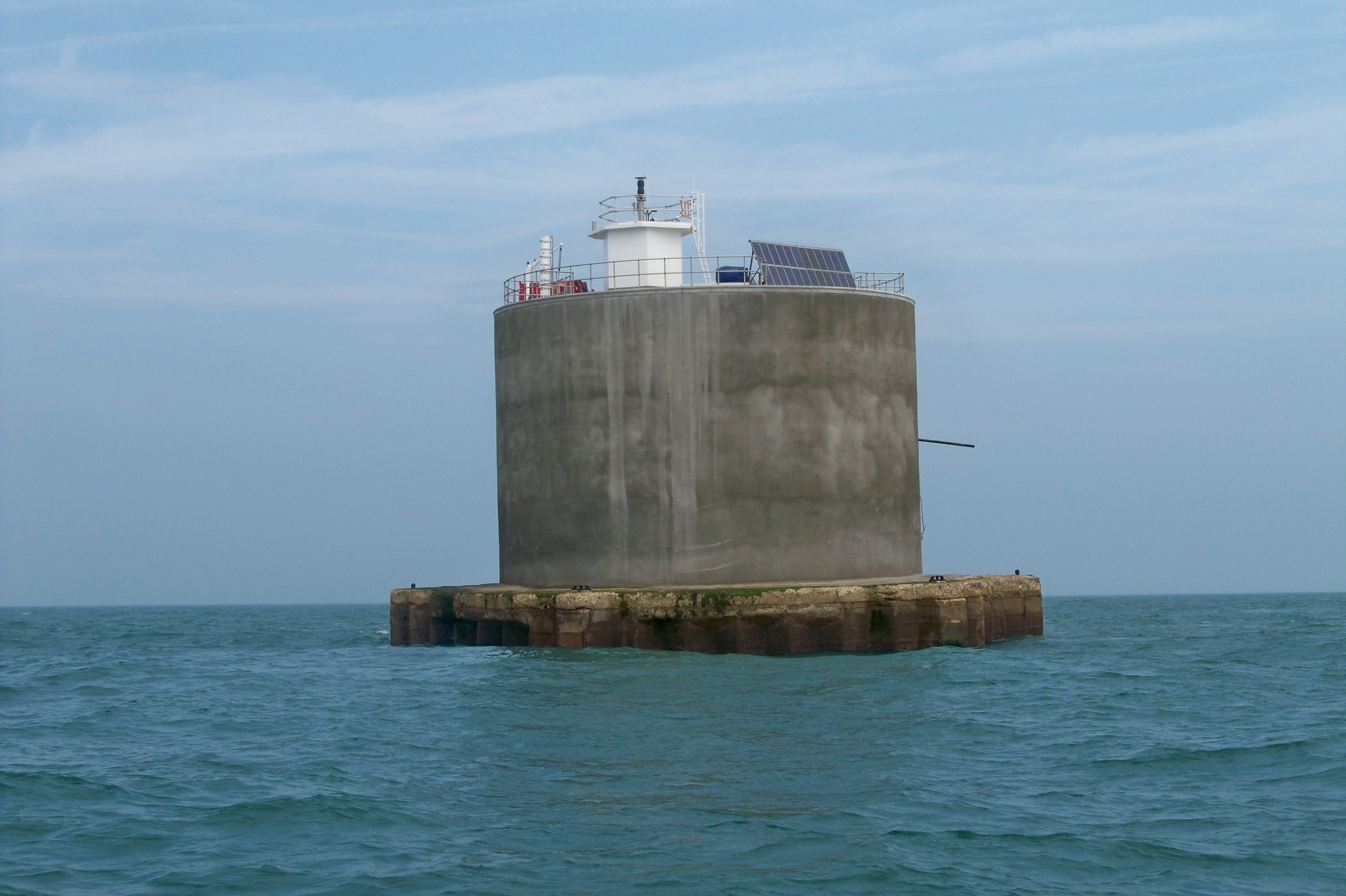
- Location: Nab Rocks, near the Isle of Wight, England
- Coordinates: 50.66749733°N 0.951162862°W

Tower
- Constructed: 1918 towed into position 1920
- Construction: Steel and concrete
- Automated: 1983
- Height: 17 m (56 ft)
- Shape: Broad cylindrical tower faced with reinforced concrete
- Markings: Unpainted tower, white light
- Operator: Trinity House
- Fog signal: 1 blast every 30s. (range 2 nmi (3.7 km))
- Racon: T

Light
- First lit: 1920
- Focal height: 17 m (56 ft)
- Light source: Vega LED lantern
- Intensity: 2,850 candela
- Range: 12 nmi (22 km)
- Characteristic: Fl W 10s.

The Nab Tower is a tower originally planned for anti-submarine protection in the English Channel in World War I. It was sunk over the Nab rocks east of the Isle of Wight to replace a lightship after the war, and is a well-known landmark for sailors as it lies off Spithead and marks the deep-water eastern entry into the Solent.

== History ==
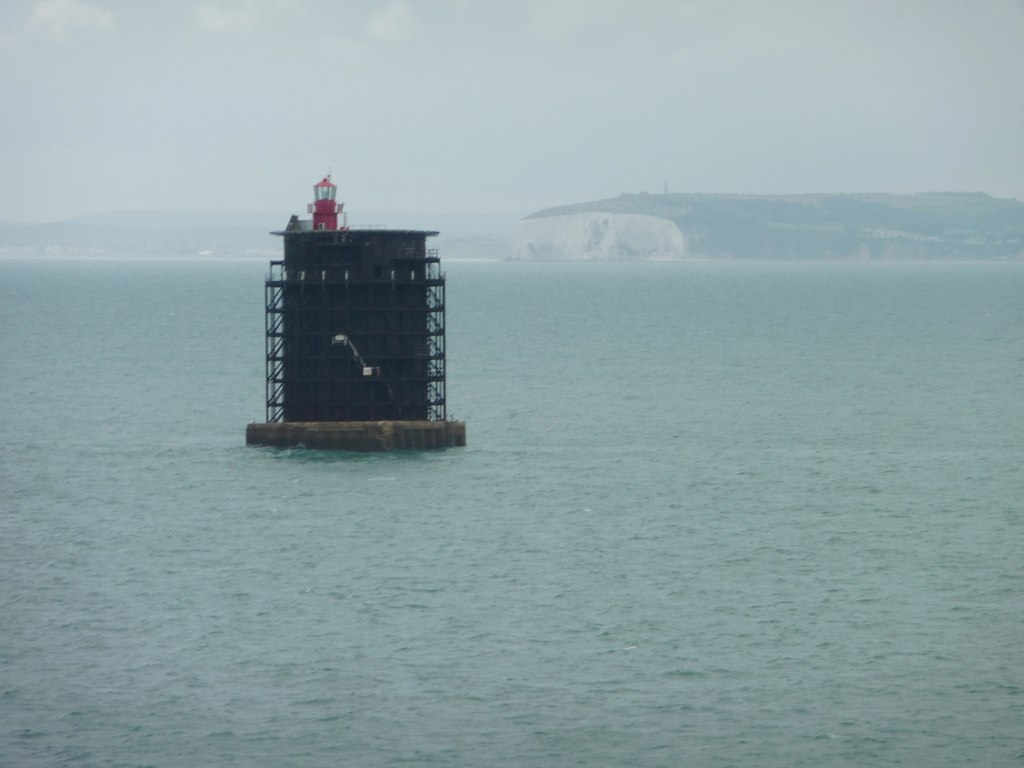
The Nab Tower prior to refurbishment

After leaving port from Southampton on April 10, 1912 the RMS Titanic briefly stopped at the Nab Light to allow maritime pilot George Bowyer to dismebark before continuing on her ill-fated maiden voyage.

During the First World War, the British Admiralty designed eight towers codenamed M-N that were to be built and positioned in the Straits of Dover to protect allied merchant shipping from German U-boats. Designed by civilian Guy Maunsell, the towers were to be linked together with steel nets and armed with two 4-inch guns with the idea of closing the English Channel to enemy ships.

However, by the end of the war in 1918, only one such tower had been completed, at a cost of one million pounds, and was located at Shoreham Harbour, awaiting deployment. While another part-built tower would eventually be dismantled in 1924, there remained the completed 92-foot-tall (28 m) metal cylinder sitting on a raft of concrete.

In 1920, the completed tower was towed by two paddle-wheel tugs to the Nab rock, a rock in the deep-water approach to the eastern Solent and previously marked by a lightship. Buoyancy was provided by the honeycomb construction of the concrete base, creating 18 watertight compartments. When these were flooded, the structure sank and settled to rest at an angle of 3 degrees from vertical towards the northeast – a characteristic tilt which is obvious to this day.

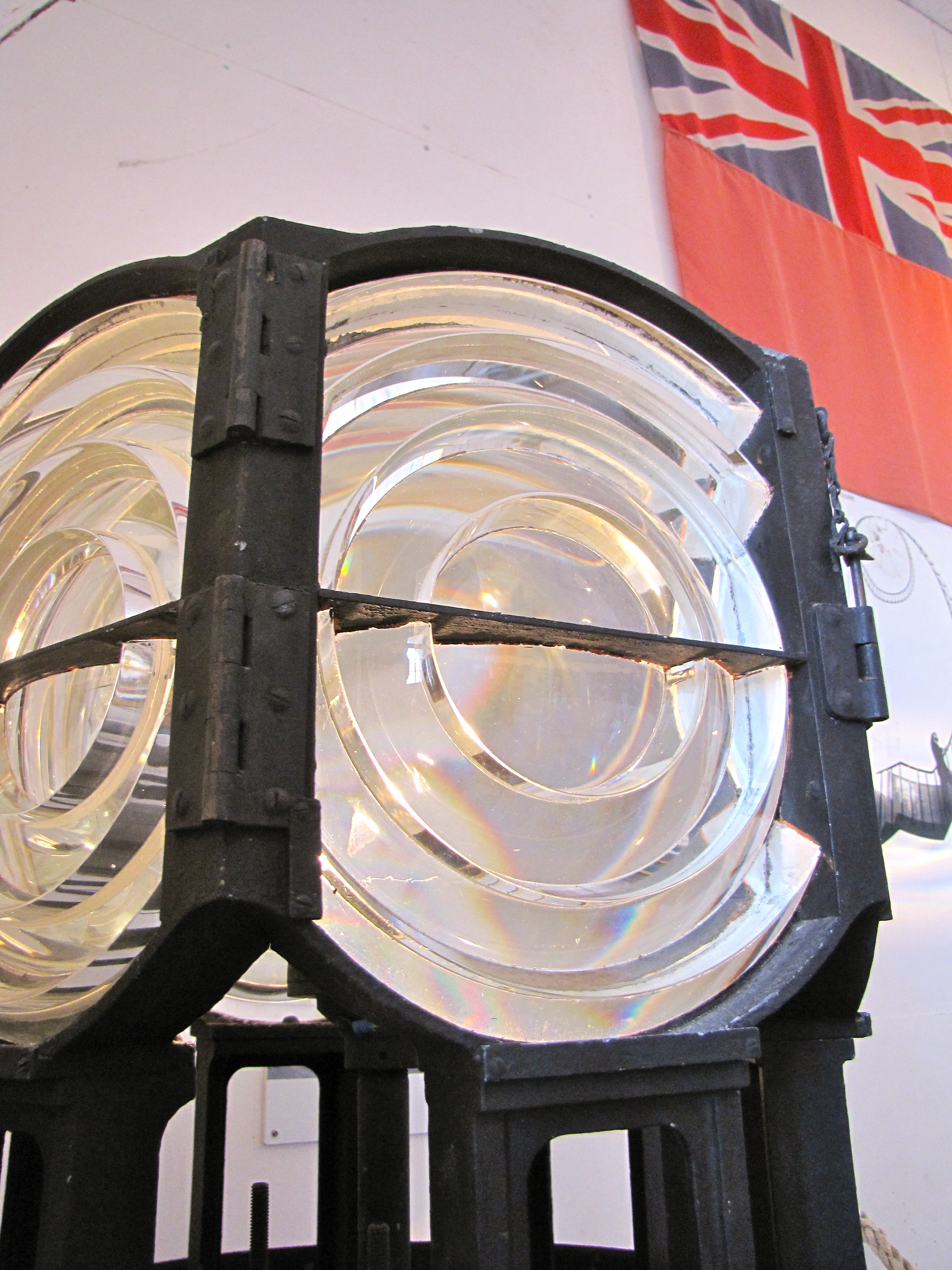
Pre-1983 optic from the Nab Tower; one of a pair, now on display inside Hurst Castle in Hampshire

Initially, the tower had a single centrally-placed lamp containing an Osram gas-filled incandescent light bulb, which gave a single white flash every ten seconds, with a visible range of 16 nautical miles. A foghorn was also installed, in a separate shed on the tower top. Later, the single light was replaced by a pair of small (fifth-order) revolving dioptric optics, each of which produced a single flash every 10 seconds; they were mounted in small turrets on opposite sides of the tower: one shone red towards the north-west, the other shone white towards the south-east (their arcs overlapped, so that vessels approaching from seaward would see the red light as well as the white if their course took them too close to St Catherine's Point, approaching from the west, or Selsey Bill, approaching from the east). In December 1935, a radio beacon was added.

In 1938, a more powerful diaphone fog signal was installed (in place of the old fog horn), which gave one 2.5-second blast every minute. It was synchronised with the radio beacon; by timing the delay between receiving the radio signal and the audible signal, vessels were able to calculate their distance from the tower. The tower was equipped with a fog bell, as well as the diaphone, which sounded one stroke every 7.5 seconds.

The Nab Tower was manned as a lighthouse, but also functioned as a Royal Navy signal station; and during World War II, it was equipped with a pair of Bofors guns to provide some defence to the Solent approach, and actually shot down several aircraft. The Royal Navy withdrew its personnel from the tower sometime after the war, but the tower remained under Ministry of Defence ownership until 1984, when Trinity House acquired the freehold (they had previously taken over responsibility for the light itself from the Admiralty in 1929).

The Nab Tower still functions as a lighthouse, but since 1983 it has been unmanned. That year, a helicopter pad was constructed on the tower, and a new pre-fabricated lantern-tower was installed containing an automated acetylene lamp; as well as powering the lamp, acetylene gas drove the revolving mechanism for the lightweight GRP optic in which the lamp was set. In 1995, the light was converted to solar power operation, and a new Orga rotating beacon was installed in the lantern (later, a Vega VRB-25 rotating beacon was used).

On 7 November 1999 the merchant freighter Dole America, carrying a cargo of bananas and pineapples, hit the Nab at 4:02. The ship was badly damaged and may have sunk if it hadn't been run aground. The base of the tower suffered superficial and internal damage. The damage was repaired in 2001.

The tower was featured as the main setting of the 1951 Hammer thriller The Dark Light.

== Major refurbishment in 2013 ==
In 2013, Trinity House commissioned BAM Nuttall to undertake a major refurbishment programme due to extensive corrosion of the upper levels, meaning it was unsafe to land helicopters on the helipad. Partial dismantling of the structure followed, undertaken with the help of a tower crane, which was installed within a former ammunition shaft. The height of the tower was reduced from 27 metres to 17, all external steel and cladding were removed, and the existing concrete sub-structure was coated in a new layer of gun-applied concrete. On completion, new AIS and RACON beacons were fitted, along with a fixed main LED light (and identical standby light) with a 12 nautical mile range; a new fog signal was also installed, sounding two blasts every 30 seconds (altered to one blast in 2022). All are solar powered.

The distinctive red lantern structure, removed as part of the refurbishment, is now on display at Hurst Castle, together with the old rotating beacon. In addition, a pair of rotating 4th-order dioptric optics, which were in use on the tower prior to automation, is also displayed at the castle.

== See also ==
- List of lighthouses in England
