= Galloway hydro-electric power scheme =

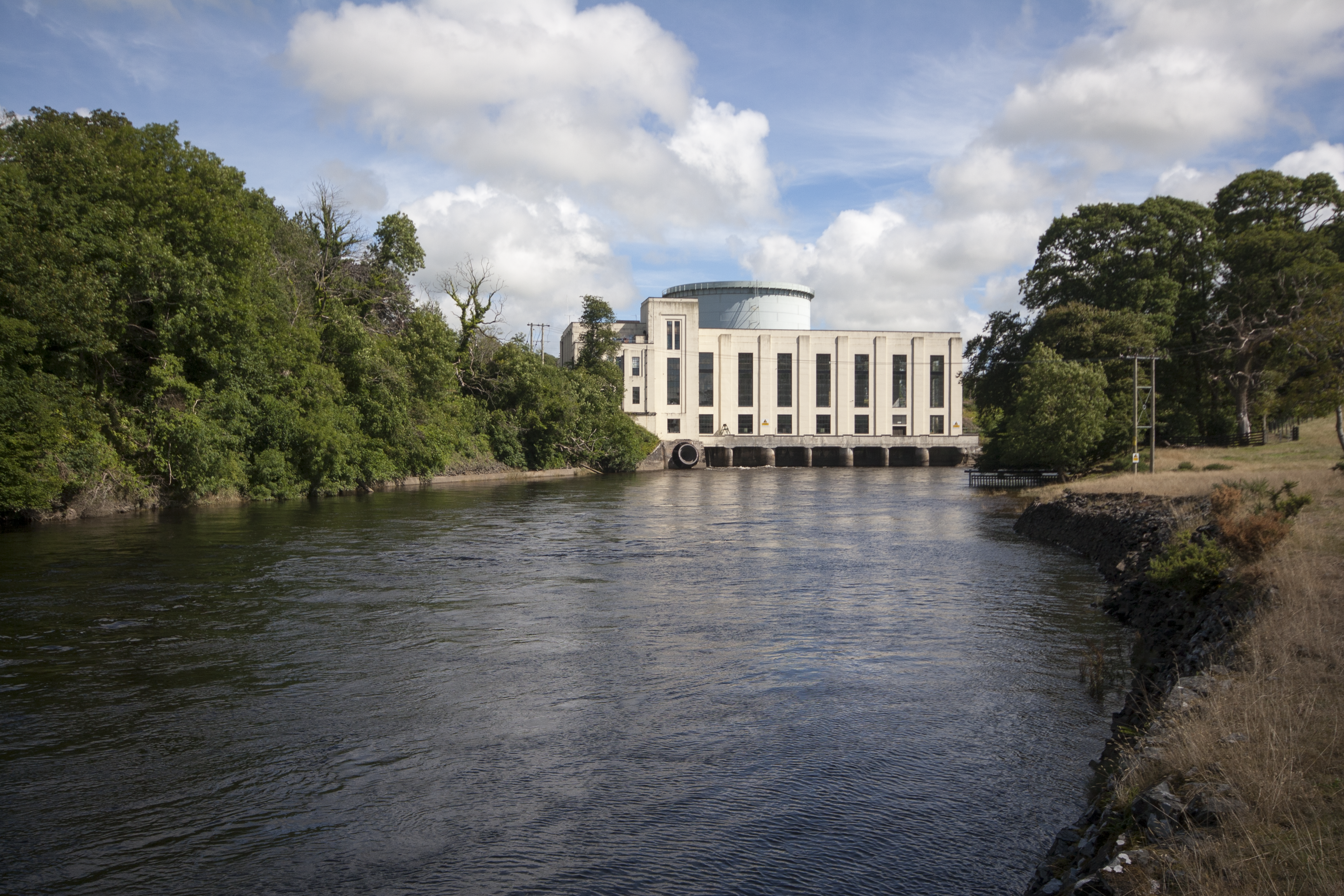
Power station at Tongland

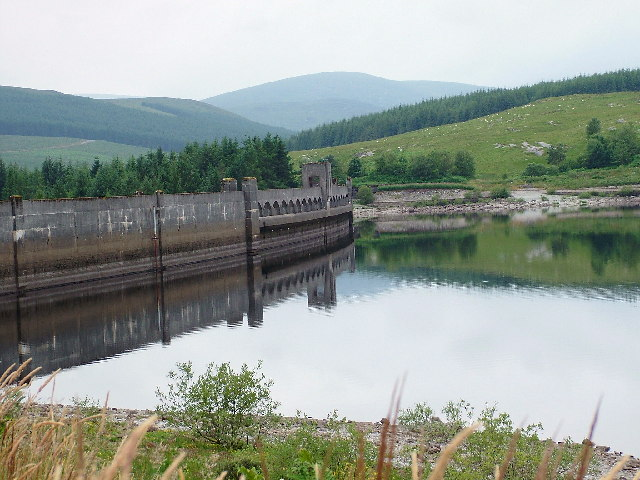
Clatteringshaws Dam, looking towards Cairnsmore of Fleet

The Galloway hydro-electric power scheme is a network of dams and hydro-electric power stations in Galloway, south west Scotland. It was built between 1930 and 1936. The majority of the scheme is within the historic county of Kirkcudbrightshire although it also takes water from parts of Ayrshire.

The generating stations draw water from the River Ken, River Dee and River Doon through reservoirs at Loch Doon, Kendoon, Carsfad, Clatteringshaws, and Tongland. The unusual modernist stations were designed by Scottish civil engineer, Sir Alexander Gibb.

The scheme, which is today operated by Drax, can produce a total peak power of around 110 megawatts, with an overall load factor of around 0.25.

== Scheme layout ==
The Galloway scheme utilises the whole catchment of the Galloway Dee, 345 square miles (890 km^{2}), which drains southwards to the Solway Firth at Kirkcudbright. The scheme also uses the Loch Doon reservoir, with a catchment area of 50 sq mi (130 km^{2}); this retains the headwaters of the River Doon, which flows northwest to the sea at Doonfoot south of Ayr.

Loch Doon reservoir forms the main seasonal storage for the scheme. The dam constructed across the outlet raised the natural water level by 27 feet (8.2 m), with a top water elevation of 705 ft (215 m). During time of heavy rainfall, the reservoir can be supplemented through a series of aqueducts and tunnels by water from 30 sq mi (78 km^{2}) of the Water of Deugh and Bow Burn, both tributaries of the Dee. During normal operation, water is drawn from the reservoir into the Dee catchment, passing through Drumjohn power station into the rest of the cascade.

The main cascade involves a further three reservoirs and power stations: Kendoon, Carsfad, and Earlstoun which are operated together, followed by Tongland power station with associated storage in the Tongland reservoir and in Loch Ken just upstream. Additionally, water from Clatteringshaws reservoir is diverted through a tunnel to the Glenlee power station upstream of Loch Ken.

== History ==
The scheme was authorized by the Galloway Water Power Act 1929 (19 & 20 Geo. 5. c. lxxx) on 10 May 1929, by which the Galloway Water Power Company was incorporated. Chairman of the board was former colonial administrator Lord Meston. Also on the board was Robert Brand, managing director of the project's underwriter, Lazard Brothers and Company.

Design was carried out by civil engineers Sir Alexander Gibb & Partners along with electrical engineer, William McLellan of Merz & McLellan. Construction began three years later in 1932 and was completed in 1936. The scheme was made viable by the recent formation of the National Grid which made generation of electricity in remote areas useful. Hydro power was particularly helpful to this grid because of its ability to be turned on and off very quickly to meet peak demands (in contrast to oil and coal stations), and to meet the natural increase during the more energy demanding winter months.

The total cost of the scheme was around three million pounds. At a cost of £29 per kilowatt of installed capacity, they were some of the least costly stations ever built in the UK.

The scheme was extended in 1984 with the addition of the Drumjohn power station which made use of the existing needle valve where the water from Loch Doon and the Deuch feed into the Dee. This station has a capacity of just 2.3 megawatts, but was constructed largely using existing infrastructure.

In 2018 Drax Group purchased the scheme, alongside a number of other assets, from then owners Scottish Power.

== Architecture ==
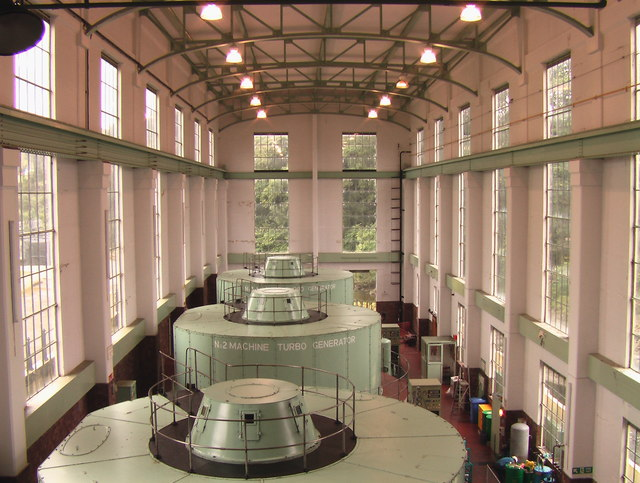
Tongland turbine hall

The stations are generally white, Modernist structures, highly glazed and with large airy turbine halls. The designs were stylistically advanced for their time and can be viewed as some of Scotland's earliest modern buildings. The credit for the design is given to Sir Alexander Gibb & Partners, however it seems likely that the design received input from Harold Tarbolton, the architectural advisor to the scheme's "Amenities Committee". This committee was set up to "make to the Company such recommendations as they may think are reasonable and proper for the preservation of the beauty of the scenery" (from section 73 of the Galloway Water Power Act 1929). Tarbolton was designer of the Pitlochry power station which bears some striking similarities to the Galloway turbine halls. Whilst no direct credit for the design work can be given to him, it is unlikely that he had no influence on the outcome.

In their book Power from Water (1960), two partners of Sir Alexander Gibb & Partners, Angus Paton, and J. Guthrie Brown (the latter of whom is known to have worked on the Galloway scheme), write that "The architecture of the power stations, under the watchful eye of the amenity committee...was given the most careful attention."

Parts of the scheme are now listed buildings, specifically the Glenlee Power Station and Bridge and the Tongland Power Station, Surge Tower and Valve House.

In great contrast to the bright pristine nature of the stations, the dams are organic and entwined with the natural rock. They are generally arch dams, curved in plan, bearing onto the side walls of the valleys except in those dams where only one side of the valley is suitable for bearing. In these latter cases, the end of the dam straightens out, and the last section of gravity dam (where the weight of the dam itself resists the force of the water) then acts like a buttress to the more efficient arch dam.

== Perceptions of the scheme ==
Local poet W. G. M. Dobie wrote:

A raider comes today who kills
The glories of our glens and hills
With unheroic Acts and Bills
And "private legislation":
The company promoters' pen
Will dam the Deugh and dam the Ken
And dam the Dee, - oh, damn the men
Who plan such desecration!

== Generating stations ==
The six generating stations, from north to south, are:

Name	Year completed	Output	Location	Head
Drumjohn	1985	2 MW	55°14′54″N 4°19′35″W	
Kendoon	1936	24 MW	55°09′48″N 4°11′28″W	150 feet
Carsfad	1936	12 MW	55°08′38″N 4°11′25″W	65 feet
Earlstoun	1936	14 MW	55°06′38″N 4°10′31″W	67 feet
Glenlee	1935	24 MW	55°05′57″N 4°11′11″W	380 feet
Tongland	1935	33 MW	54°51′36″N 4°02′02″W	106 feet

== Bibliography ==
- Hill, George (1984). Tunnel and Dam: The Story of the Galloway Hydros. South of Scotland Electricity Board.
- Paxton, Roland; Shipway, Jim (2007). Civil Engineering Heritage, Scotland Lowland and Borders. Thomas Telford. ISBN 978-0-7277-3487-7.
- Payne, Peter L (1988). The Hydro. Aberdeen University Press. ISBN 978-0-08-036584-8.
- Hudson, W; Hunter, J K (April 1938). "THE GALLOWAY HYDRO-ELECTRIC DEVELOPMENT, WITH SPECIAL REFERENCE TO THE CONSTRUCTIONAL WORKS. (INCLUDES PHOTOGRAPHS)". Journal of the Institution of Civil Engineers. 8 (6): 323–375. doi:10.1680/ijoti.1938.14630. ISSN 0368-2455.
- Hunter, J K; Williams, F H; Donkin, S B; LORD MESTON; Binnie, W J E; Blake, R; Hobson, H; Ball, E B; Lowe Brown, W L; Brown, W L L; Williamson, J; Bridge, N C; Halcrow, W T; Lloyd, D; Hawthorne, W (April 1938). "DISCUSSION ON 5165, 5164 & 5163. GALLOWAY HYDRO-ELECTRIC DEVELOPMENT. (INCLUDES PLATES)". Journal of the Institution of Civil Engineers. 8 (6): 423–454. doi:10.1680/ijoti.1938.14633. ISSN 0368-2455.
