= Mullwharchar =

Hill in Dumfries and Galloway, Scotland

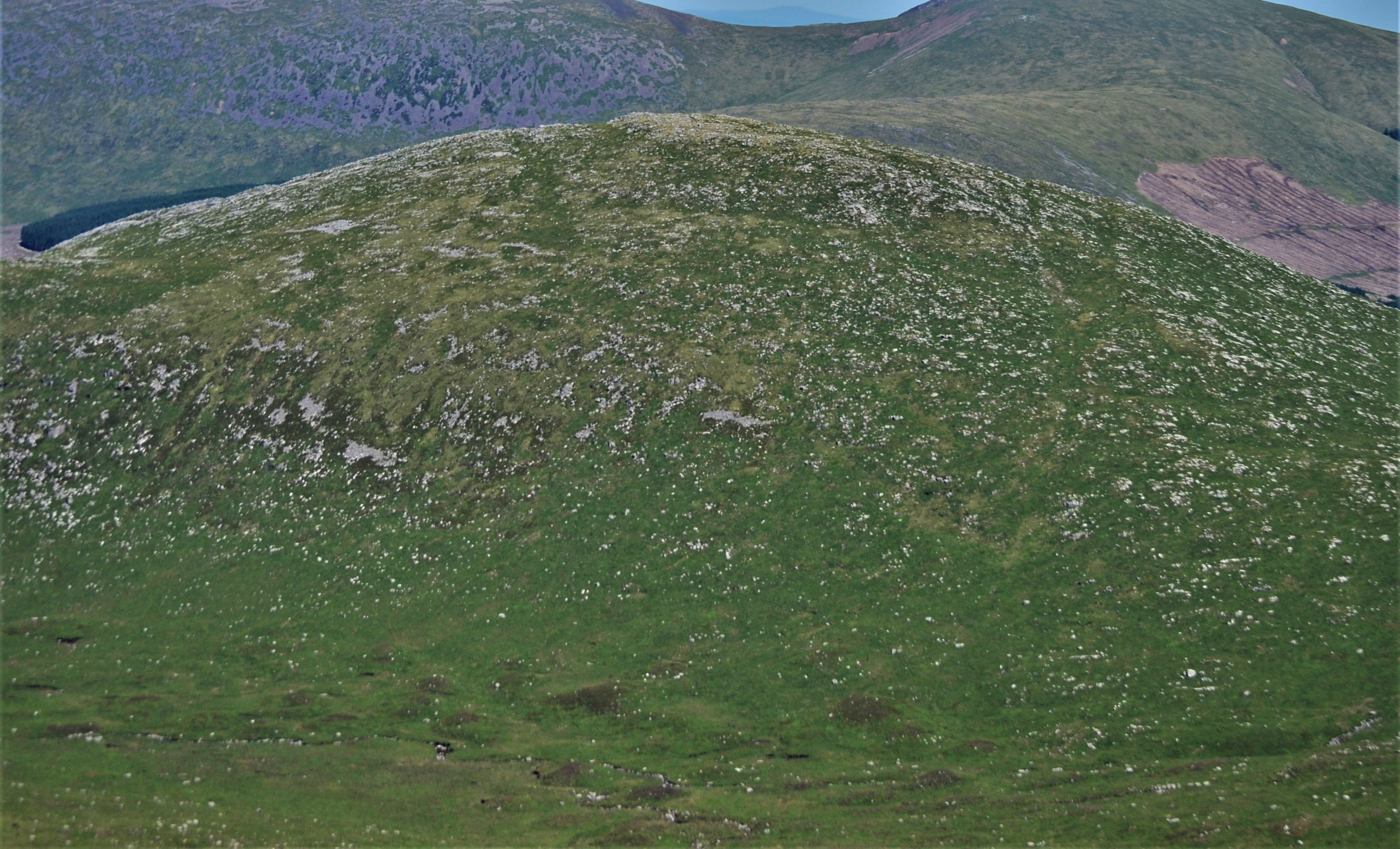

Highest point
- Elevation: 692 m (2,270 ft)
- Prominence: 187 m (614 ft)
- Listing: Ma,Hu,Tu,Sim, G, D,DN,Y
- Coordinates: 55°09′00″N 4°25′37″W

Naming
- English translation: Scottish Gaelic: possibly Bare Hill of Farquhar

Geography
- Location: Dumfries and Galloway, Scotland
- Parent range: Dungeon Hills, Galloway Hills, Southern Uplands
- OS grid: NX 45419 86634

Mullwharchar is a hill in the Dungeon Hills, a sub-range of the Galloway Hills range, part of the Southern Uplands of Scotland. Mullwarchar is situated to the north of Loch Enoch, west of Corserine, northeast of Merrick and east of Kirriereoch Hill. There are three cliffs on the mountain named The Slock, The Tauchers and The Organ Pipes and some routes on these are occasionally climbed. Mullwharchar's summit is fairly flat and dotted with erratics.

== Nuclear waste ==
A planning application was made in January 1978 to Kyle and Carrick District Council by the UKAEA to test drill on Mullwharchar for the purpose of dumping nuclear waste. On 24 October 1978, the Council rejected the application after considerable local protest, which included a petition with 100,000 signatures being sent to the Queen. The appeal against the decision cost £19,700.
