= Indus Basin Project =

Water control project

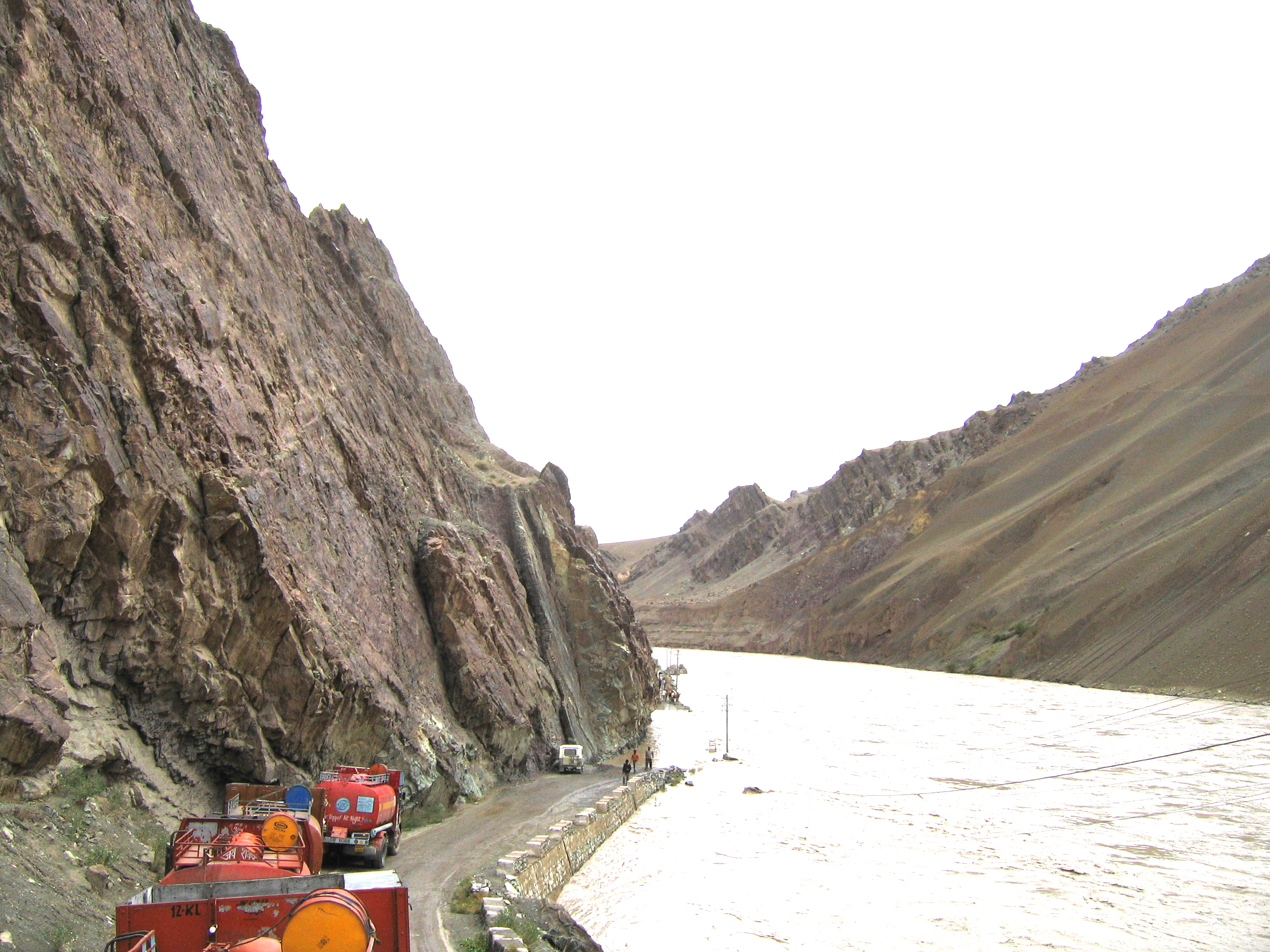
A flooded Indus River inundates the Srinagar-Kargil-Leh highway.

The Indus Basin Project is a water control project that resulted from a treaty, Indus Waters Treaty, signed between India and Pakistan in 1960 that guaranteed what Pakistan would receive water from the Indus River independent from upstream control by India.

The project consisted of the construction of two main dams, the Mangla Dam built on the Jhelum River and the Tarbela Dam constructed on the Indus River, together with their subsidiary dams.
