= River Doon =

River in Scotland

Coordinates: 55°26′22″N 4°39′00″W

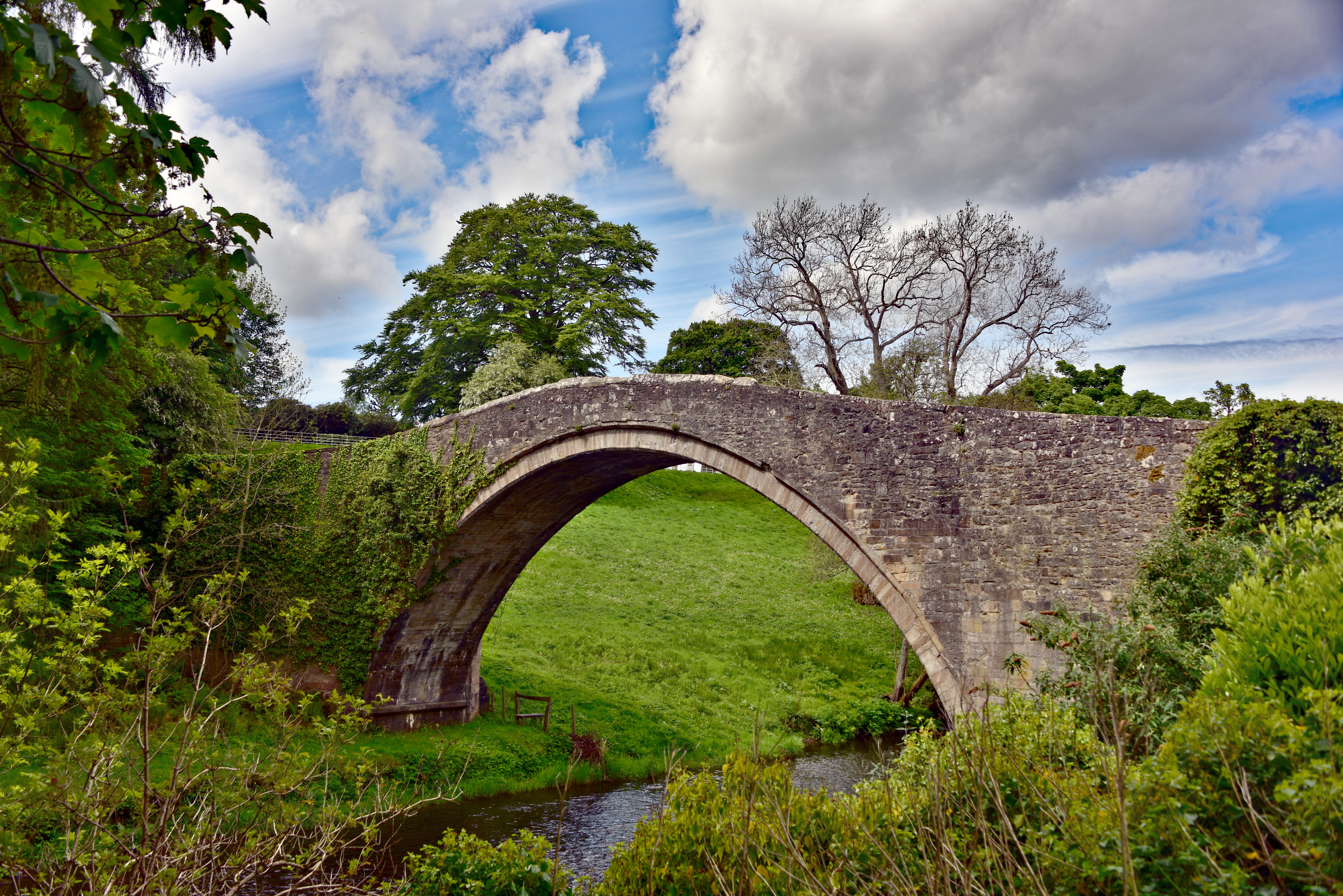
- Auld Brig o' Doon
- Native name: Scottish Gaelic: Abhainn Dhùin

Physical characteristics
- Source: Loch Doon
- Mouth: Firth of Clyde
  - location: South of Ayr

The River Doon (Scottish Gaelic: Abhainn Dhùin, pronounced [avɪɲˈɣuːɲ]) is a river in Ayrshire, Scotland. Its course is generally north-westerly. The source of the Doon is Loch Doon, high in the Galloway Hills. It reaches the Firth of Clyde just south of Ayr.

== Course ==
The River Doon begins at Loch Doon, flowing in a northwesterly direction from the loch. The loch is dammed at the source of the river by the Loch Doon Dam, built in the 1930s, to provide water to the Galloway Hydro Electric Scheme, today operated by Scottish Power.

The river flows north from the loch through Ness Glen, a densely forested gorge, and Bogton Lock. It then passes near to the town of Dalmellington, and through the villages of Patna, Dalrymple, and Alloway, birthplace of Robert Burns.

The Doon ends its nearly 40-mile course at the Firth of Clyde, just south of Ayr.

== Watermills ==
There were a total of 11 watermills along the course of the Doon. They were mainly for grinding corn but there was a thread works at Patna and a cloth mill at Skeldon.

== In popular culture ==
The Doon is mentioned in Burns' classic narrative poem Tam o' Shanter, along with the Brig o' Doon, which spans 72 feet (22 metres) across the river, just outside Alloway. The river is also the major setting for his lesser-known poem The Banks o' Doon.
