= Cliff Quay Power Station =

Coal-fired power station in Suffolk, England

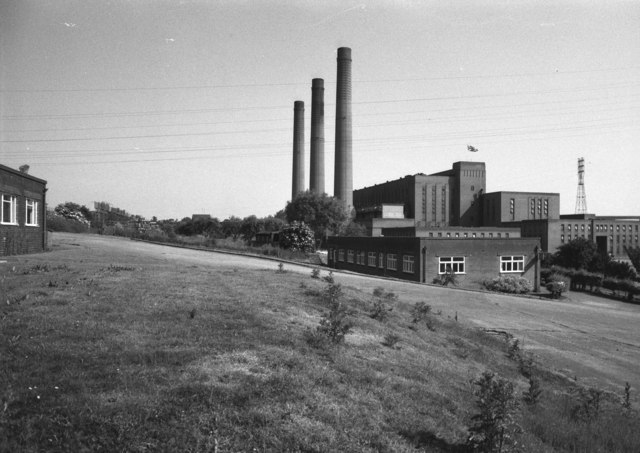
- Cliff Quay Power Station viewed from the north in June 1983
- Official name: Cliff Quay Power Station
- Country: England, United Kingdom
- Location: Ipswich, Suffolk, East of England
- Coordinates: 52.0358°N 1.1579°E
- Status: Demolished
- Commission date: 1949
- Decommission date: 1985
- Owner: As operator
- Operators: British Electricity Authority (1949–1955); Central Electricity Authority (1955–1957); Central Electricity Generating Board (1958–1985)

Thermal power station
- Primary fuel: Bituminous coal
- Chimneys: 3
- Cooling towers: None
- Cooling source: River / sea water

Power generation
- Units operational: 6 x 46 MW
- Make and model: Metropolitan-Vickers
- Units decommissioned: All
- Nameplate capacity: 276 MW
- Annual net output: See graph in text

External links
- Commons: Related media on Commons

Cliff Quay Power Station was a coal-fired power station situated to the south of Ipswich, Suffolk, in the East of England. The station was designed by Sir Alexander Gibb & Partners and built by the Cleveland Bridge Company.

== History ==
Cliff Quay power station was a larger replacement for the earlier Ipswich power station of c.1919, built by Ipswich Corporation.

=== Ipswich power station ===
In 1923 Ipswich power station comprised two 3 MW turbo alternators and one 225 kW reciprocating machine providing a 3-phase, 50 Hz, 230 and 400 Volt AC supply. In addition there were two 1 MW turbines and one 500 kW reciprocating machines generating a 230 and 460 Volt DC supply. The generators were powered by 93,500 pounds per hour of steam. In 1923 the maximum load on the system was 3,867 kW from 13,349 consumers. A total of 5.750 GWh of electricity was sold in 1923 for £67,198. This produced a surplus of revenue over expenses of £35,773.

Upon nationalisation of the British electricity supply industry in 1948 the ownership of Ipswich power station was vested in the British Electricity Authority, and subsequently the Central Electricity Authority and the Central Electricity Generating Board (CEGB). At the same time the electricity distribution and sales responsibilities of the Ipswich electricity undertaking were transferred to the Eastern Electricity Board.

In 1961 Ipswich power station had an installed electricity generating capacity of 17.25 MW. This was from one 6.25 MW, one 5 MW and two 3 MW Brush-Ljungstrom turbo-alternators. A DC supply was available from two 2 MW and one 1 MW Mather Platt and one 1.5 MW British Thomson-Houston rotary converters. The three Babcock and Wilcox chain grate boilers produced steam at a rate of 162,000 lb/hr (20.4 kg/s) at a pressure of 250 psi (17.2 bar) and 338 °C. The station used water from the rivers Orwell and Gipping for condensing and cooling. In 1961 the thermal efficiency of the station was 6.09 per cent. The electricity output over the period 1954-66 was as follows.

Ipswich power station: electricity output
Year	Output GWh
1946	49.55
1954	6.38
1955	8.98
1956	11.03
1957	7.28
1958	2.12
1961	0.214
1962	1.117
1963	5.628
1964	2.731
1965	9.068
1966	8.622

Ipswich power station was decommissioned in 1967.

== Cliff Quay ==
Cliff Quay power station was sanctioned in March 1939 and construction commenced in June 1945 undertaken by the Ipswich Corporation. Upon nationalisation on 1 April 1948 ownership and construction became the responsibility of the British Electricity Authority. The first generating set was commissioned in March 1949 and the following sets in June 1949, September 1949, May 1950, December 1950 and September 1952.

Cliff Quay power station was built on a 104-acre (42.1 ha) site on the north bank of the River Orwell 2 miles south of Ipswich. The area included 17 acres (6.9 ha) of foreshore reclaimed as a coal store and 40 acres (16.1 ha) reclaimed as an ash lagoon.

=== Specification ===
The station had a total installed generating capacity of 276 megawatt (MW) and comprised six 46 MW turbo generators made by Metropolitan-Vickers. The station's nine boilers were made by Babcock Power Ltd, and burned pulverised bituminous coal. The boilers produced steam at a total rate of 3,285,000 lb/hr (414 kg/s) at a pressure of 600 psi (41.4 bar) and 441 °C. River / sea water was used for condensing and cooling. In 1961 the thermal efficiency of the station was 25.28 per cent.

Electricity output of the station in GWh over the period 1954-84

In 1958 the Ipswich electricity district supplied an area of 103 square miles and a population of 145,700. The amount of electricity sold and the number and types of consumers was as follows:

Year	Electricity sold, MWh	No. of consumers
1956	170,942	47,504
1957	177,773	48,568
1958	187,394	49,521

In 1958 the above totals were made up of the following:

Type of Consumer	No. of consumers	Electricity sold, MWh
Domestic	44,270	71,729
Commercial	3,061	29,983
Combined premises	1,191	4,568
Farms	303	2,092
Industrial	689	73,980
Public lighting	6	2,222
Traction	1	2,820
Total	49,521	187,394

== Closure ==
A fire in September 1982 caused major damage to the station. It finally closed in 1985. The station was then demolished in November 1994. The station was demolished by MJ Finnigan & Co. In 1997, a 7,500 square metre bulk storage shed was built on the site of the power station.
