= Loch Doon =

Freshwater loch in Scotland

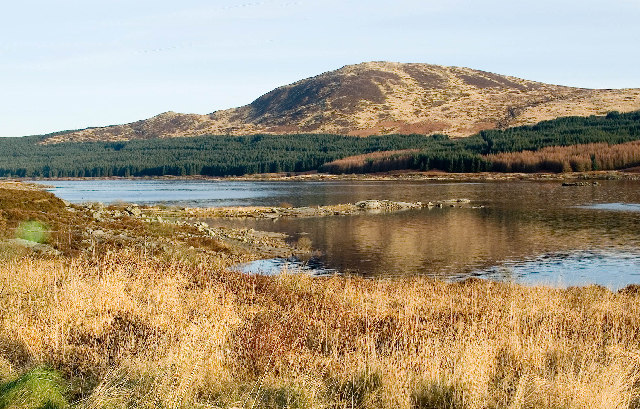

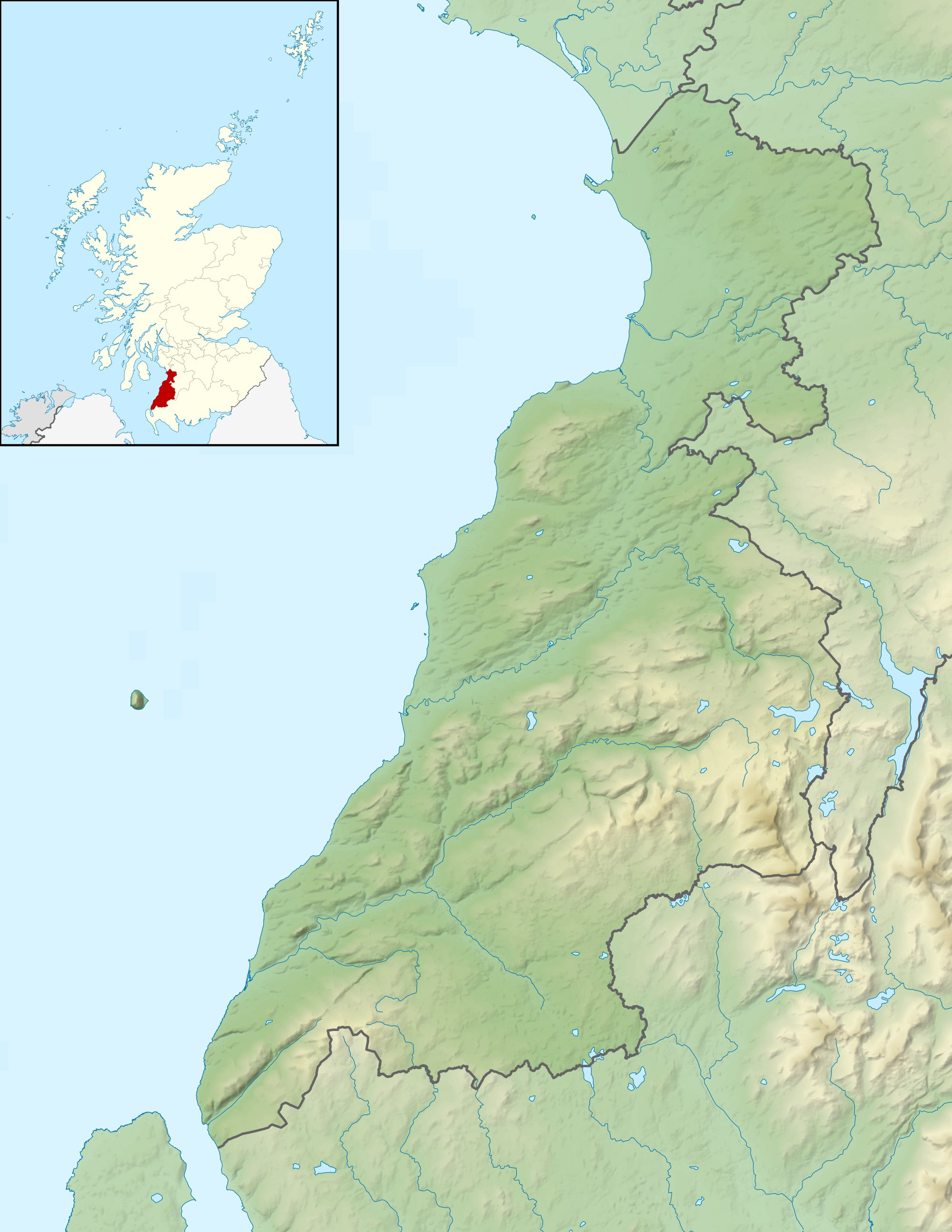
- Location within South Ayrshire
- Location: Carrick
- Coordinates: 55.250°N 4.372°W
- Type: freshwater loch
- Primary outflows: River Doon
- Basin countries: Scotland

Loch Doon (Scottish Gaelic: Loch Dùin, pronounced [l̪ˠɔxˈt̪uːɲ]) is a freshwater loch in Carrick, Scotland. It is considered relatively oligotrophic. The River Doon issues from its northern end, while the loch itself receives waters from Gala Lane and Loch Enoch (in the Galloway Hills) via Eglin Lane.

== History ==
In the 13th century, it was a site of Balloch Castle, owned by the Earls of Carrick. In the Scottish Wars of Independence it was held by one Gille Brighde, Sir Gilbert de Carrick, a native Carrick nobleman who surrendered it to the English. It was soon recovered by the Scots. In the 15th century, it was frequently in the hands of the Kennedy Clan, although it was briefly in the hands of the Maclellans (backed by William Douglas, 8th Earl of Douglas) after a siege in 1446. The castle was destroyed in the 16th century by King James V as part of a general policy of reducing the power of the barons.

In the First World War, there was a growing need to train pilots and aircrew in aerial gunnery. Loch Doon was thought to be ideally suited for such an establishment with its surrounding steep hills being an ideal position for target ranges. Work began in September 1916 and an airfield, slipways, piers, jetties, seaplane hangars, tramways and other associated buildings erected. The remains of these can still be found on the Loch shore today.

The loch was dammed in the 1930s, raising the water some 27 feet (8.2 m) to provide seasonal storage for the Galloway hydro-electric power scheme. As a reservoir, Loch Doon has an effective capacity of over 82 million cubic metres. When rainfall is plentiful, water is diverted to the loch from the Water of Deugh via a tunnel system. When water is required for power generation, water is released at Drumjohn to feed Kendoon power reservoir, the first in a series of generating stations and reservoirs on the Water of Ken.

During construction work, the ruins of the castle were moved from an island in the Loch to the shore to avoid the rising water.

== Air crashes ==
Two aircraft are known to have crashed in or near the Loch in the Second World War.

On 18 March 1944 F/O Roswell Murray MacTavish of 439 Squadron, Royal Canadian Air Force was on a training flight from RAF Heathfield in Hawker Hurricane Mk. IV LD564 when it crashed into the forest beside the loch. MacTavish was killed and is buried in Ayr Cemetery. Remains of the aircraft, including its Rolls-Royce Merlin engine, are still at the crash site.

=== Loch Doon Spitfire ===
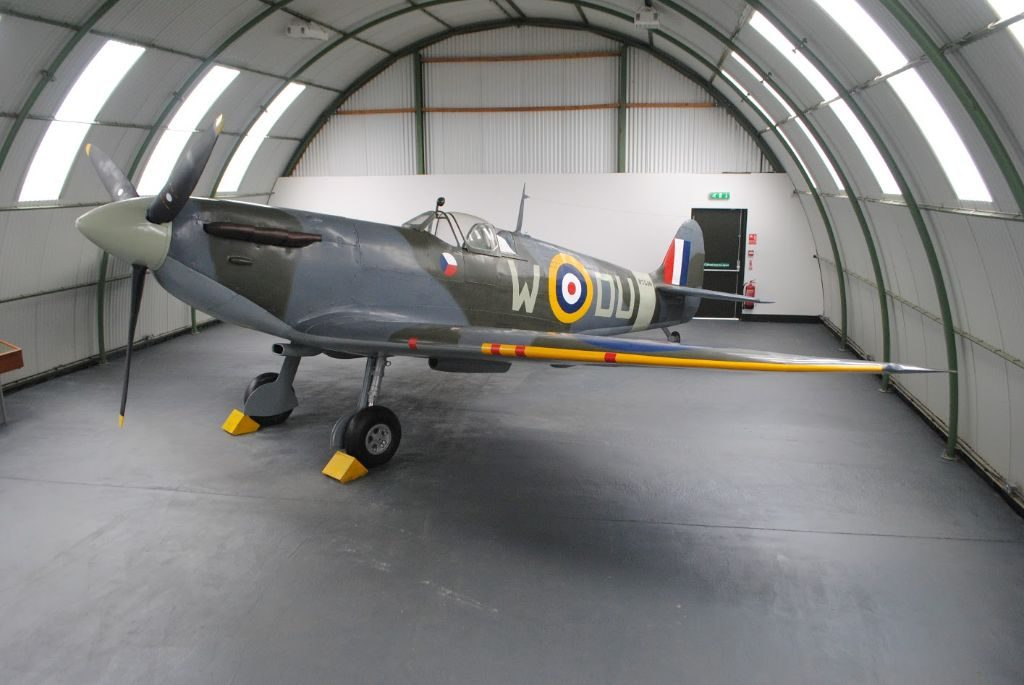
Spitfire Mk IIA P7540, DU-W, at Dumfries and Galloway Aviation Museum

On 25 October 1941 F/O František Hekl of No. 312 (Czechoslovak) Squadron RAF crashed a Spitfire Mk IIA into the loch on a solo training flight from RAF Heathfield. The Spitfire was serial number P7540, carrying the marking DU-W.

An eyewitness saw the Spitfire flying low over the surface of the loch when Hekl banked the aircraft to starboard and its starboard wingtip caught the water surface. Hekl lost control and the aircraft broke up and sank, leaving only a patch of oil on the water. An RAF salvage crew brought a boat and spent several days trawling parts of the bed of the loch, but failed to find either the aircraft or Hekl's body.

In 1977 the Dumfries branch of the Scottish Sub Aqua Club began a systematic search of the bed of the loch in the area where an eyewitness thought the aircraft had crashed. In 1979 several clubs from the Northern Federation of British Sub-Aqua Clubs joined the search, and Blackpool Sub-Aqua Club took over organisation of the project.

The search was unsuccessful so in 1982 it was moved to a different area of the loch, where divers quickly found the Spitfire's tail and rear part of the fuselage. In subsequent dives other parts of the aircraft were found, scattered over a distance of 200 metres. Both wings were badly damaged, magnesium parts such as the undercarriage wheels had corroded away, but the Merlin Mk XII engine was recovered in good condition. Hekl's body was not found.

The wreckage was moved to Dumfries and Galloway Aviation Museum, where the aircraft was slowly restored and a pair of replica wings fitted. Restoration to non-flying condition was completed in 2017.

In September 2025, a memorial to Hekl was unveiled on the shore of the loch. Created by a local sculptor, Kevin Roberts from a design by Pavel Holý, it depicts the wing of a Spitfire sinking into the water.

== See also ==
- List of reservoirs and dams in the United Kingdom
