= Easton Gibb & Son =

Easton Gibb & Son was a Scottish civil engineering firm, specialising in public works projects, founded by (Alexander) Easton Gibb.

In 1900, Alexander Gibb, Easton Gibb's son, became the firm's chairman and managing director, taking over from his father. Under his chairmanship, it was responsible for the construction of Rosyth Naval Dockyard, beginning before the outbreak of the First World War.
