= Alexander Gibb =

British civil engineer (1872–1958)

Brigadier-General Sir Alexander Gibb GBE CB FRS FRSE
- Gibb at the wedding of his eldest son, Alistair, in 1927

Director-General of Civil Engineering, Ministry of Transport
- In office 1919–1922

Civil Engineer-in-Chief to the Admiralty
- In office 1918–1919

Personal details
- Born: 12 February 1872 Broughty Ferry, Forfarshire, Scotland
- Died: 21 January 1958 (aged 85) Hartley Wintney, Hampshire, England
- Spouse(s): Norah Isobel Monteith, m. 1900-1940 (her death)
- Children: 3
- Engineering career
- Discipline: Civil
- Institutions: Royal Society; Institution of Civil Engineers
- Practice name: Sir Alexander Gibb & Partners

Sir Alexander Gibb (12 February 1872 – 21 January 1958) was a British civil engineer. After serving as Civil Engineer-in-Chief to the Admiralty and Director-General of Civil Engineering at the Ministry of Transport, he established the engineering consultancy firm Sir Alexander Gibb & Partners.

== Early life and military service ==
Gibb was born in Broughty Ferry, Forfarshire, the son of civil engineer Alexander Easton Gibb and his wife, Hope Brown Paton. He was the great-grandson of John Gibb, an early member of the Institution of Civil Engineers and a colleague of its first President, Thomas Telford.

He was educated at the High School of Dundee, the Abbey School in Beckenham, Rugby School and University College London, although he left the latter after a year to become articled to the prominent civil engineers John Wolfe Barry and Henry Marc Brunel.

Having completed his training, he became resident engineer on the Metropolitan District Railway's Whitechapel and Bow Railway extension. He joined his father's company, Easton, Gibb & Son, in 1900 when they were building the King Edward VII Bridge at Kew.

That same year (1900), Gibb married Norah Isobel Monteith (1879-1940), daughter of Fleet Surgeon John Lowry Monteith RN, and they had three sons, including Lieutenant Colonel Alistair Monteith Gibb.

Gibb later worked on the construction of the Rosyth naval dockyard where he is credited with accelerating the programme so that it was brought into use during the First World War. In 1916, Gibb was appointed Chief Engineer of Ports Construction to the British Armies in France and Belgium, becoming Deputy-Director of Docks, British Expeditionary Force in France in 1917. During this time he prepared plans for the repairs of Belgian harbours, was responsible for the water supply for Belgium, and prepared special landing facilities for cross-channel ferries at Dieppe, Calais and Dunkirk.

Gibb was appointed a Companion of the Order of the Bath and a Knight Commander of the Order of the British Empire in the 1918 New Year Honours in recognition of his military service. Later that year he was appointed Civil Engineer-in-Chief to the Admiralty with responsibility for all naval civil engineering works, with projects including the Admiralty M-N Scheme - an anti-submarine boom across the English Channel.

== Later career ==
He joined the Ministry of Transport in 1919 as Director-General of Civil Engineering, and in the following years served on a number of committees including the Technical Committee on London Traffic (as chair), the Electrification of Railways Advisory Committee and the Light Railways Investigation Committee (as chair). Additionally he was a technical adviser to the Treasury on civil engineering schemes financed under the Trades Facilities Act and he was transport representative for the ministry on the Forth Conservancy Board. In 1920 he was appointed Knight Grand Cross of the Order of the British Empire.

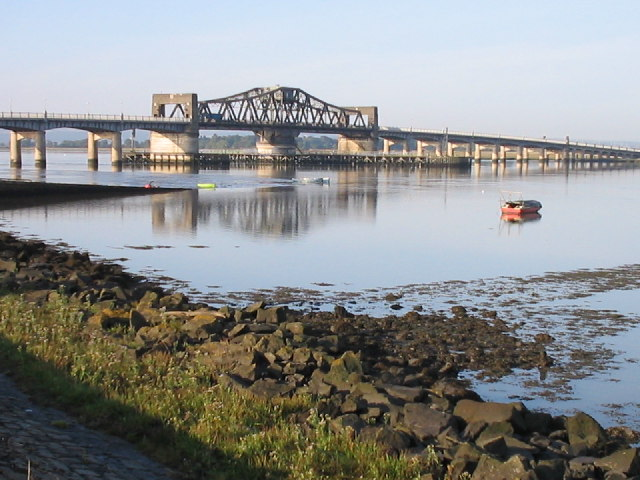
The Kincardine Bridge, crossing the Firth of Forth (1936)

Gibb founded his own firm, Sir Alexander Gibb & Partners, in 1922 after becoming a consulting engineer the year before. He was involved in a variety of projects worldwide, including Barking Power Station, the Galloway hydro-electric power scheme (1935-36) (both with Charles Hesterman Merz and William McLellan), the Kincardine Bridge (1936), a study at the port of Rangoon and work at the Singapore Naval Base. In the 1930s the firm gained work in the industrial sector, including the Park Royal Guinness brewery. This led their engagement in 1939 to undertake the design and supervision of three ordnance factories for the Ministry of Supply, work which would continue throughout the Second World War.

He also wrote The Story of Telford: The Rise of Civil Engineering, a biography of the Civil Engineer Thomas Telford, to whom his great-grandfather John Gibb had been a deputy.

Outside of engineering, Gibb served as Vice-chairman of the Managing Sub-Committee of University College London, sat on the Education Committee of the London County Council and was a member of the Council and Executive Committee of Princess Helena College.

Gibb became less involved with his firm after 1945 and died at his home in Hartley Wintney, Hampshire, on 21 January 1958.

== Honours ==
In 1914 he was elected a Fellow of the Royal Society of Edinburgh. His proposers were John MacKay Bernard, Sir Thomas Hudson Beare, Ernest Wedderburn, and William Archer Tait.

Gibb was elected a Fellow of the Royal Society in 1936 and was a member of a number of professional bodies, holding the presidencies of the Institution of Civil Engineers (1936–37), the Institution of Chemical Engineers (1927–28 and 1928–29), of which he was an original member, the Institution of Engineers-in-Charge (four times), the Institute of Transport, the Junior Institution of Engineers, the Institute of Welding (three times) and the London Chamber of Commerce & Industry. He was also chairman of the Association for Consultancy and Engineering and the first civil engineer appointed to the Royal Fine Arts Commission.

Gibb received an honorary Doctor of Laws (LLD) from the University of Edinburgh and was a fellow of University College London.

In addition to his British honours, Gibb received the American naval Distinguished Service Medal and was appointed Commander of the Belgian Order of the Crown, Grand Officer of the Order of Boyaca, Colombia and Grand Cross (1st class) of the Order of the Three Stars, Latvia (4 October 1935).

Gibb was a prominent Freemason and became Provincial Grand Master of Ross and Cromarty and Past Substitute Grand Master of Scotland.

He was inducted into the Scottish Engineering Hall of Fame in 2023.

== Publications ==
- — (1935). The Story of Telford: The Rise of Civil Engineering. London: A. Maclehose & Co. OCLC 2221517.

Professional and academic associations
Preceded by John Duncan Watson	President of the Institution of Civil Engineers; November 1936 – November 1937	Succeeded by Sydney Donkin
