= Loch Baile Mhic Chailein =

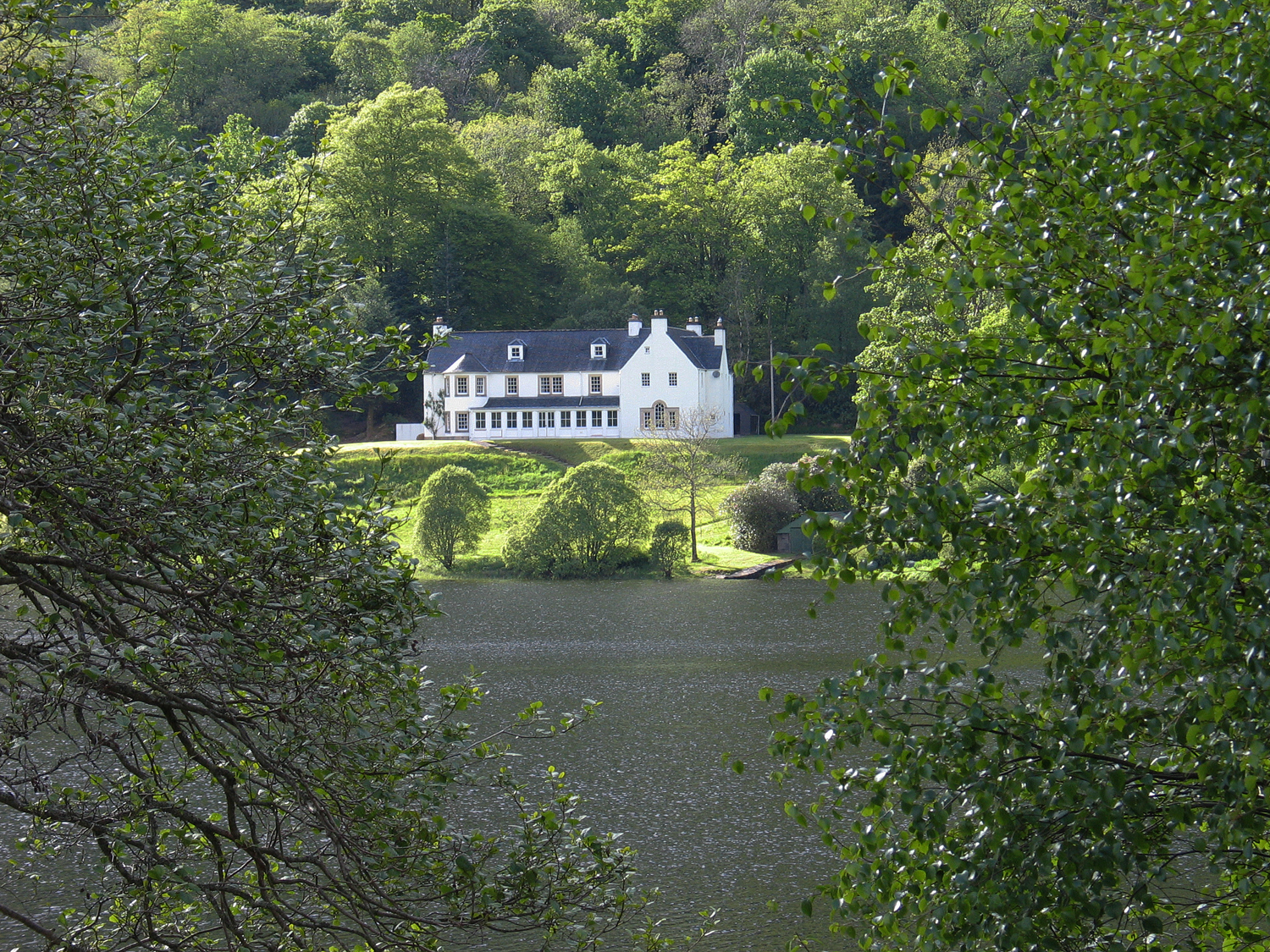
- Loch Baile Mhic Chailein from its east shore, with Fasnaloich House, centre

- Location within Argyll and Bute
- Location: Scottish Highlands
- Coordinates: 56°34′41″N 5°13′16″W
- Primary inflows: River Creran
- Primary outflows: River Creran
- Basin countries: Scotland, United Kingdom
- Max. length: 576 m (1,890 ft)
- Max. width: 329 m (1,079 ft)
- Surface elevation: 10 m (33 ft)

Loch Baile Mhic Chailein is a loch in Argyll, Scotland, situated on the River Creran roughly 5.5km upstream of Loch Creran.

Its name translates from Scottish Gaelic to "Loch of MacColin's Farm".

Loch Baile Mhic Chailein sits in a bed of pelite and quartzite, with alluvium surrounding it. A crannog appears on OS maps of the loch's west shore.
