= Cairnsmore of Fleet =

Mountain in Scotland

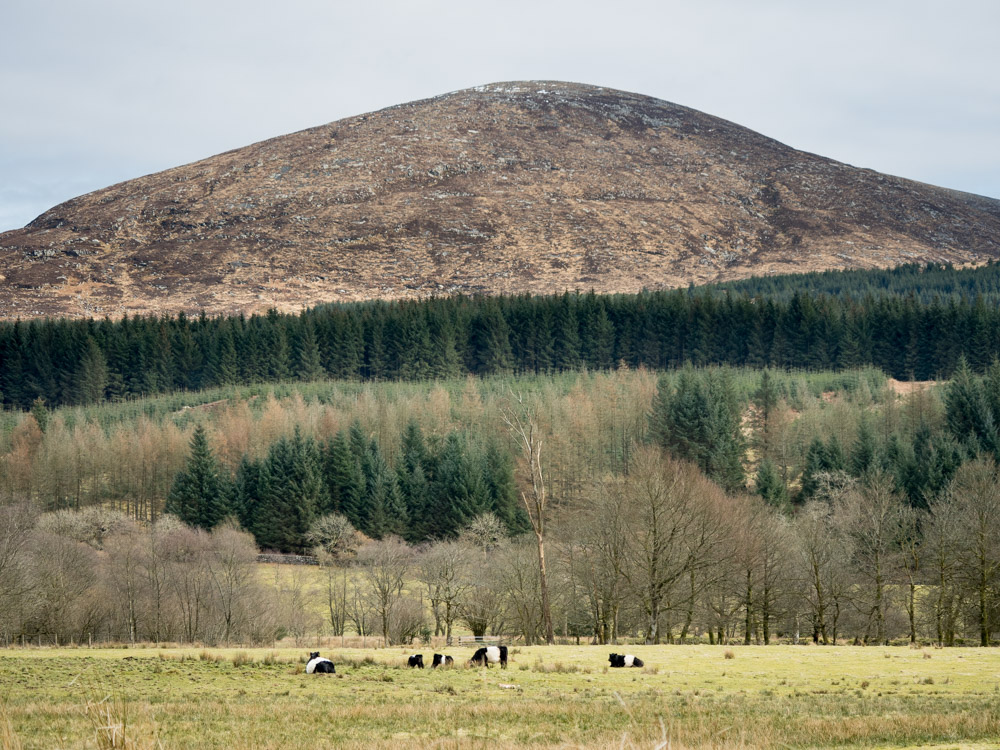

Highest point
- Elevation: 711 m (2,333 ft)
- Prominence: 522 m (1,713 ft)
- Listing: Ma,Hu,Tu,Sim, G, D,DN,Y,P500
- Coordinates: 54°58′32″N 4°20′30″W

Naming
- English translation: Scottish Gaelic: Big Hill of Fleet

Geography
- Location: Dumfries and Galloway, Scotland
- Parent range: Galloway Hills, Southern Uplands
- OS grid: NX 50121 67048
- Topo map: OS Landranger 83

Cairnsmore of Fleet is an isolated mountain in the Southern Uplands of Scotland. The mountain forms an unafforested granite massif, whose highest point is about ten kilometres (six miles) east of Newton Stewart. It is the highest of the "Solway Hills" sub-range, and the southernmost of Scotland's 219 Grahams, thus making it, or rather its subsidiary top, Knee of Cairnsmore, the most southerly mountain in Scotland. The view to the south takes in the Cree Estuary and Wigtown Bay, and extends as far as the Lake District, the Isle of Man and Snowdonia. The highest summits of the Galloway Hills can be seen to the north, and Ireland is in the view to the west.

It is home to the most extensive area of open moorland in Galloway, and has been designated as a Site of Special Scientific Interest (SSSI). The summit and eastern flanks of the mountain (an area of 1,922 hectares) are designated as a national nature reserve, which is managed by NatureScot.

Cairnsmore of Fleet lies in the south of the council area Dumfries and Galloway, and in the historic county of the Stewartry of Kirkcudbright.

== Flora and fauna ==
Cairnsmore of Fleet is home to many of the typical habitats of upland Britain, such as grasslands of purple moor grass (Molinia caerulea), Calluna vulgaris and Vaccinium myrtillus heaths and localised blanket mire with Trichophorum and cotton-grass (Eriophorum). The summit region is characterised by sheep's fescue (Festuca ovina), bilberry, Carex bigelowii and the moss Racomitrium lanuginosum.

The massif is also home to a variety of birds, mammals and invertebrates. Bird species including upland raptors such as the merlin, peregrine falcon, kestrel, raven and buzzard all breed at Cairnsmore of Fleet, as do birds such as golden plover and dotterel. Hen harriers visit the area in the winter months, and golden eagle may also be seen, but no longer breed on the site. Both red and roe deer inhabit the area: the red deer live on the central upland area of the reserve throughout the year, whilst roe deer can be seen at the edges of the surrounding forests. There is also a population of feral goats that may be descended from animals abandoned by crofters during the 18th and 19th centuries. Seventeen species of butterfly and over 120 species of moth have been recorded at Cairnsmore of Fleet, including the small pearl-bordered fritillary, large heath moth, broad–bordered white underwing and argent and sable. Other notable invertebrate species found include the nationally notable golden green ground beetle.

Red and black grouse are managed on the estates, and there is extensive grazing by domestic sheep (chiefly Scottish Blackface) and cattle, which helps maintain habitats for birds. This has been hampered by the decline in farming of traditional breeds, such as Belted Galloway cattle, with farmers keeping breeds more suited to lowland grazing.

== Conservation designations ==
Cairnsmore of Fleet National Nature Reserve
- IUCN category II (national park)
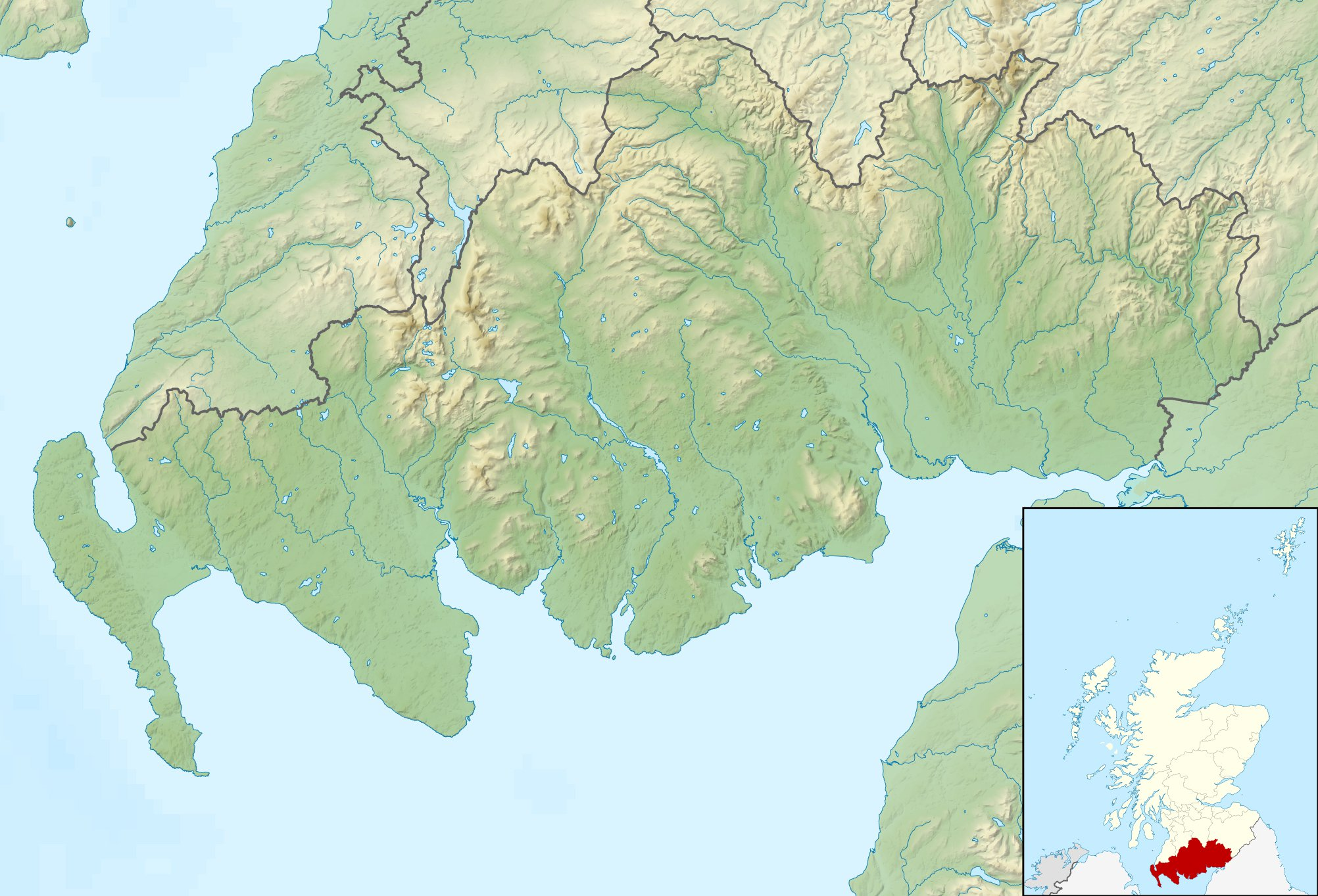
- Location within Dumfries and Galloway
- Location: Cairnsmore of Fleet, Dumfries and Galloway, Scotland
- Coordinates: 54.975°N 4.342°W
- Area: 1,922 ha (4,750 acres)
- Established: 1975
- Governing body: NatureScot
- Website: Cairnsmore of Fleet National Nature Reserve

The landscape of Cairnsmore of Fleet is typical of the granite uplands of Galloway, consisting of open moorland, with montane ground at higher altitude. This type of landscape was historically common across the Southern Uplands, but the increase in forestry land use in the Galloway Forest Park has seen it become much rarer. A national nature reserve (NNR) was established in 1975 to protect the continuity between un-afforested moorland and montane ground above the potential tree limit. The total land area within the NNR is 1,922 ha, of which 1,314 ha was purchased by the Nature Conservancy Council (the predecessor to NatureScot) from the Forestry Commission in 1974; a further 608 ha (including the summit of Cairnsmore of Fleet) belong to neighbouring landowners, and are managed under Nature Reserve Agreements.

The NNR is classified as a Category II protected area by the International Union for Conservation of Nature, and forms an important part of the Galloway and Southern Ayrshire UNESCO Biosphere Reserve, a network of reserves that are meant to demonstrate a balanced relationship between people and nature. It is one of three "core areas" of the Biosphere, alongside Silver Flowe and the Merrick Kells.

Cairnsmore of Fleet has been designated as a Site of Special Scientific Interest (SSSI) since 1968: the SSSI covers a wider area than the NNR, being 3837 ha in size.

== Tourism & outdoor activities ==
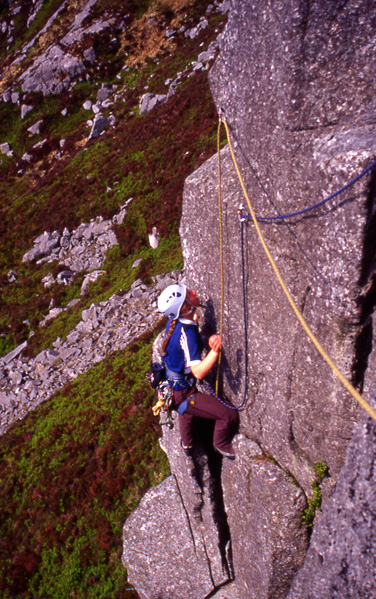
Rock climbing on Craignelder

The usual route of ascent is the "Tourist Route", which is one of the most popular hikes in Galloway. It starts in the south-west, near Stronord, before climbing through the Bardrochwood Moor forest on to the summit. The Cairnsmore estate, near the start of this path, is the location mentioned in John Buchan's 1915 thriller The Thirty-nine Steps. Another route reaches the summit from the south, starting near the NNR visitor centre. This takes in the subsidiary summits of the Knee of Cairnsmore and Meikle Mulltaggart to form a circular route on the eastern side of the mountain.

There are a number of good rock climbing areas on the subsidiary peaks around Cairnsmore of Fleet, but many of these may have nesting birds on them in spring. The climbing is all on good quality granite. Areas that are described in the current guidebook include Craignelder, Loch Grannoch and the Clints of Dromore.

National Cycle Route 7 runs to the south of Cairnsmore of Fleet, passing underneath the Big Water of Fleet viaduct.

A visitor centre, operated by NatureScot and open all year, is located at Dromore at the southern end of the national nature reserve. NatureScot have commissioned five sculptures which have been located around the reserve. The sculptures were produced by artist Matt Baker and are each accompanied by poetry written by Mary Smith. These artistic works are intended to reflect elements of the landscape.

== History ==
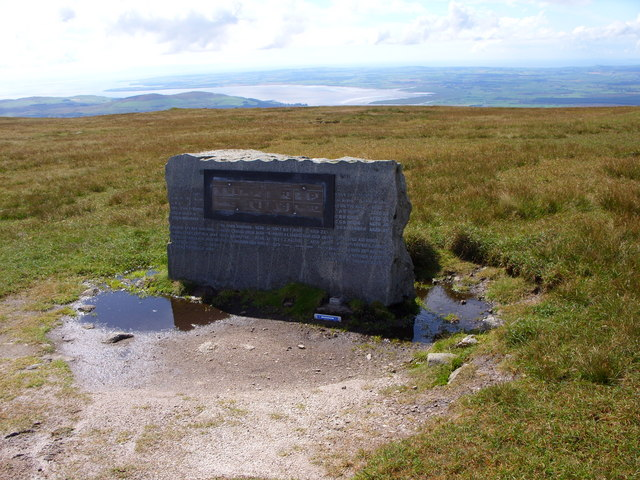
The memorial to aircrews killed in crashes on Cairnsmore of Fleet.

The earliest evidence of human occupation at Cairnsmore of Fleet dates to the Bronze Age: sites showing evidence of the cultivation of land on the southern side of the mountain and cairns on the summit all date from this period. Later, during the medieval period, flocks of sheep and goats were grazed here during the summers by Cistercian monks. Animals were also hunted for game during this period.

During the 18th and early 19th centuries land use changed with the clearance of small tenants during the process of enclosure. The population in the area dropped as the main activity became sheep farming, with small numbers of shepherds looking after large flocks. Hunting also declined, and the mining of minerals (chiefly lead) commenced. The enclosure process was resisted by some tenants, and during the 1720s the Cairnsmore of Fleet moors became the headquarters of Billy Marshall, leader of a group known as the "Galloway gypsies" who demolished dykes in the area during 1724. The Galloway gypsies also engaged in smuggling, and are reputed to have made their base at "Billy Marshall's cave" on the north side of the mountain.

The latter part of the 19th century saw the arrival of the Portpatrick and Wigtownshire Railway, which opened in 1860: the railway viaduct over the Big Water of Fleet remains a prominent feature in the landscape to the south Cairnsmore of Fleet. During the Victorian period accessibility via the railway led to a boom in grouse shooting, with sporting interests becoming the main activity on the western side of the hill.

Close to the summit of Cairnsmore of Fleet stands a memorial stone to the crews of aircraft that have crashed on the mountain. Between 1940 and 1979 eight crashes occurred: the earliest was a Luftwaffe Heinkel bomber, and the latest a United States Air Force McDonnell Douglas F-4 Phantom II.
