= Round Loch of Glenhead =

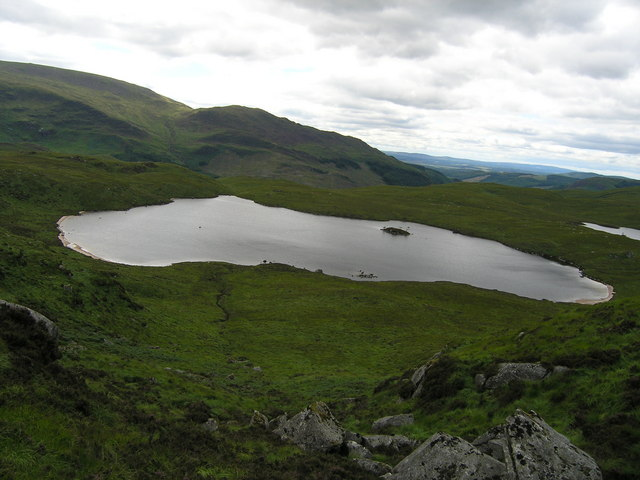
- The loch in summer 2006 looking approximately southwest from the slopes of Craiglee towards Mulldonach (centre) and Lamachan Hill (left).

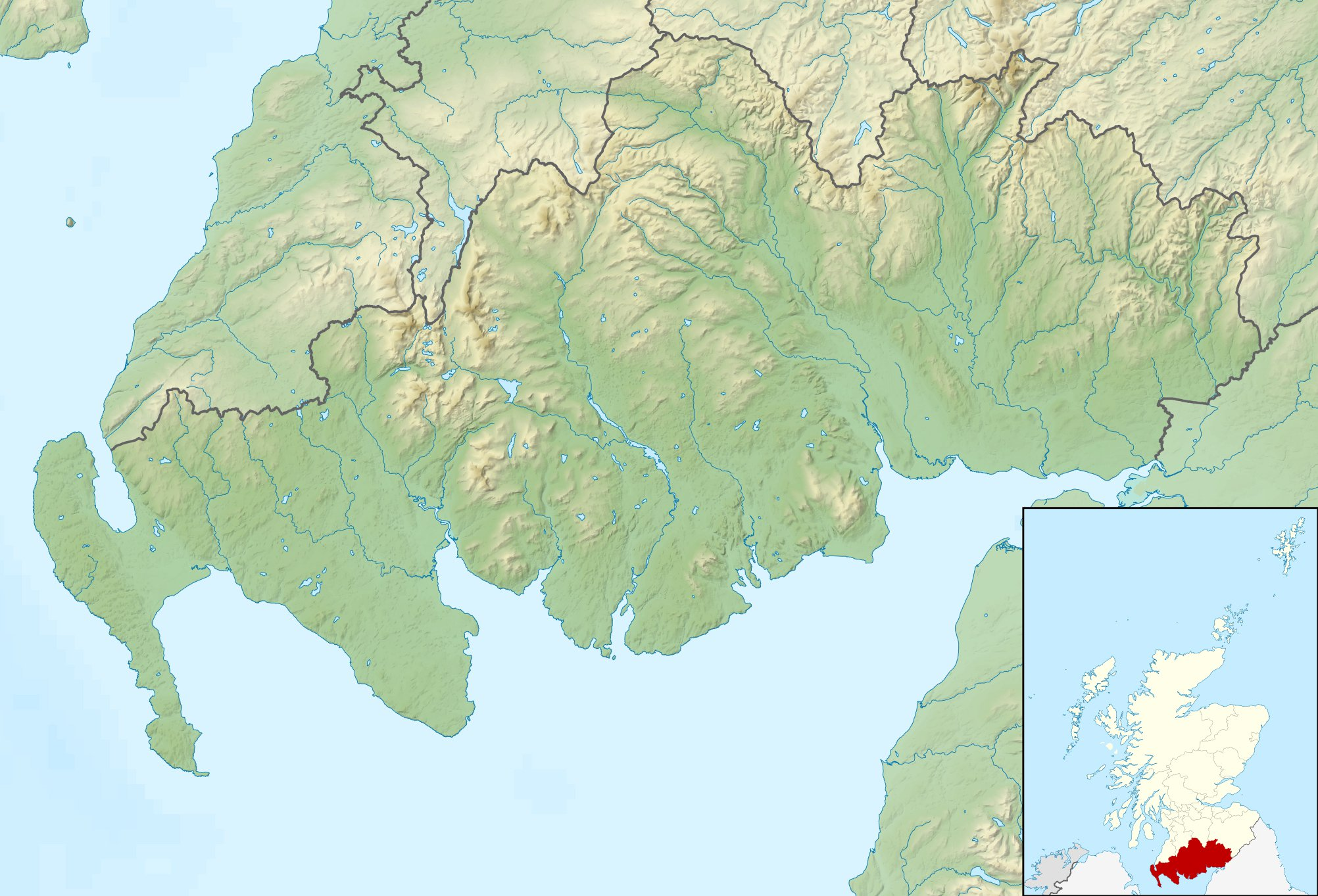
- Location within Dumfries and Galloway
- Location: Galloway, Scotland
- Coordinates: 55°5′36.7″N 4°25′48.78″W
- Type: natural
- Primary inflows: blanket peats (seepage & pipeflow) and minor streams
- Primary outflows: Round Loch Burn
- Catchment area: 0.90–0.95 km^{2} (0.35–0.37 sq mi)
- Surface area: 12.7 ha (31 acres)
- Max. depth: 13.5 m (44 ft)
- Residence time: 90 days
- Surface elevation: 295–298 m (968–978 ft)

The Round Loch of Glenhead is a small upland single basin loch in Dumfries and Galloway. It is situated within Galloway Forest Park to the west of the hill Craiglee. It forms a pair with the nearby Long Loch of Glenhead. Both lochs are of similar sizes and each have a small island. The two lochs are separated from Loch Valley and Loch Naroch to the north by the Rig of the Jarkness. The loch is drained to the southwest by Round Loch Burn, which after joining into Glenhead Burn flows into Loch Trool.

The catchment of the loch, which receives around 2.3 m of precipitation per year, is 90 hectares of the slopes of Craiglee and some flatter areas nearer the loch. These are characterised by soils varying from thick peat to bare granite and tonalite. The unafforested catchment has vegetation typical of moorland blanket mires. The area is grazed by cattle in the summers only; having previously supported sheep, with periodic peat burning.

The loch has suffered badly from the effects of acidification. As of 2012 the loch had started to recover from this but was still chronically affected, with nitrate and sulphate levels also high. Over the period of July 2013 to December 2014 the pH varied from 4.1 to 6 and the dissolved oxygen ranged from 8.7 to 12.7 mg/L.

The lake and its catchment are part of the Merrick Kells Site of Special Scientific Interest and Special Area of Conservation and the Silver Flowe-Merrick Kells UNESCO biosphere reserve

The loch is monitored since 2005 on an intermittent basis by the (now) United Kingdom Lake Ecological Observatory Network and the Upland Waters Monitoring Network (the United Kingdom Acid Waters Monitoring Network from 1988 to 2013). As of 2011 it was the 'most fully equipped site for monitoring upland water quality and freshwater biodiversity in the UK'

The loch is characterised as oligotrophic and polymictic

The main plant species present in the catchment include moor grass, heathers including common heather, bracken and sedge and includes other species commonly associated with upland blanket mires such as moor matgrass and potentilla.
