= St Cyrus National Nature Reserve =

Scottish nature reserve

- IUCN category II (national park)
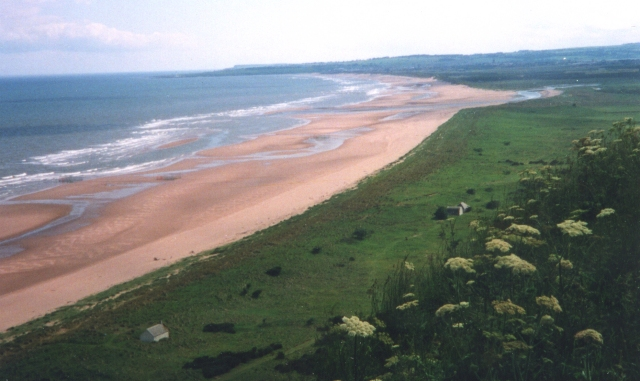
- St Cyrus Beach

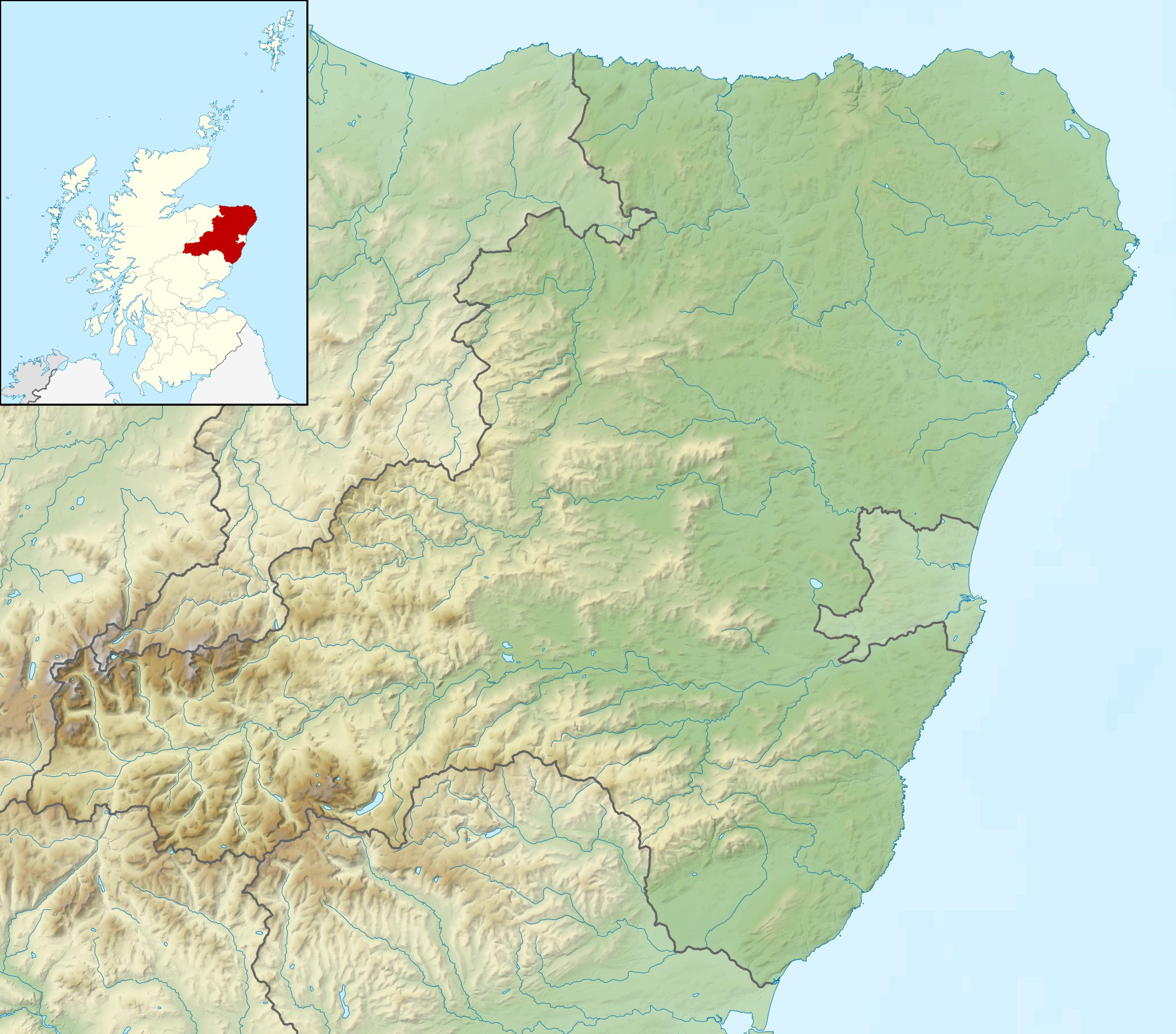
- Location within Aberdeenshire
- Location: Aberdeenshire, Scotland
- Coordinates: 56.763801°N 2.418300°W
- Area: 92 ha (230 acres)
- Established: 1962
- Governing body: NatureScot
- Website: St Cyrus National Nature Reserve

St Cyrus National Nature Reserve is situated between the village of St Cyrus and the North Sea in the far south of the council area of Aberdeenshire in Scotland. The national nature reserve (NNR) comprises a narrow strip of land that is 3.5 km long and less than 500 m across at its widest point: the total area is 92 hectares (230 acres), most of which is only a few metres above sea level and bounded by cliffs to the west. It forms the northern third of Montrose Bay, with the River North Esk marking its southern boundary. The reserve was declared in 1962, and is managed by NatureScot. The cliffs and dunes provide a nationally important habitat for flowering plants and insects, many of which are at their northern limit in Britain. The reserve is one of the most important botanical sites on the north-east coast of Scotland, supporting over 300 plant species.

A visitor centre run by NatureScot is located within an old lifeboat station, which also provides educational facilities for groups of school children, bird watchers and botanists. The centre opened in 1989 and underwent a major upgrade in 2004. As of 2008 around over 15,000 people visited the centre annually. NatureScot has waymarked a 1.5 km path known as the Tyrie Trail, and there several other paths across the reserve.

== Geology and geomorphology ==
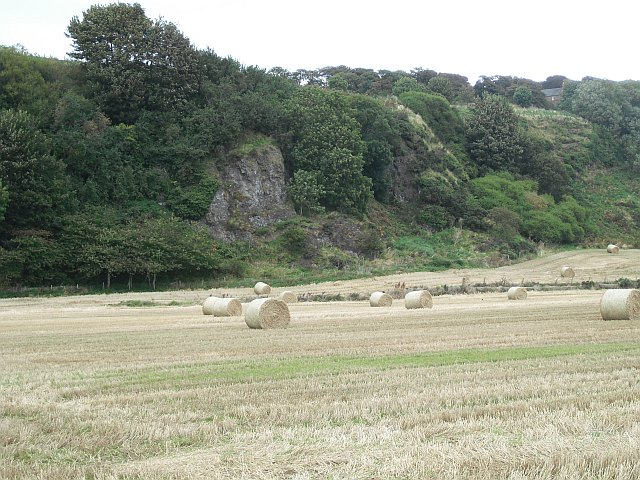
Former sea cliffs at Warburton

The cliffs that border the reserve formed around 400 million years, and are composed primarily of mainly andesite and basalt. They were formerly sea cliffs, formed at the end of the last Ice Age when the sea level rose due to melting ice. The changes in sea level over time can be seen in the raised beaches along the base of the cliffs. The coastline at St Cyrus NNR continues to change constantly, and as of 2008 the dunes of the reserve were continuing to grow. The course of the River North Esk has also altered over time, and the old channel that the river took prior to 1879 remains visible several hundred metres to the north of the current course. The position of river mouth continues to moves along the coast with time.

== Flora and fauna ==
St Cyrus has a warmer climate than much of northeast Scotland due to the warming influence of the sea, and as a result many of the plants found here are living at their northern limits. Examples of this include species such as maiden pink, wild liquorice, yellow vetch and the carnivorous Nottingham catchfly.

With the abundance of wildflowers, St Cyrus NNR is also an important site for butterflies, moths and grasshoppers. One species of particular note is the small blue butterfly, a United Kingdom Biodiversity Action Plan (BAP) species at its northern habitat limit. Over 200 species of moth have been recorded on the reserve, including the cinnabar moth: St Cyrus is the most northerly location at which this moth has been recorded. The reserve is also the northern limit for the land snail Cepaea nemoralis.

St Cyrus NNR is one of the best-known bird sites in Angus and Kincardine, with over 70 different species of bird having been recorded here. These include waders such as redshank, oystercatcher, common sandpiper and curlew. The cliffs also provide a home for buzzard, kestrel and peregrine falcon. Furthermore, the prevalence of gorse shrub provides a nesting place for such small perching birds as whitethroat, stonechat and yellowhammer. St Cyrus was formerly renowned for its breeding colony of little and arctic terns: these species have been largely absent in recent years.

Mammals living at St Cyrus include roe deer, red foxes, stoats and rabbits. Common and grey seals make use of the sand banks at the mouth of the North Esk, and dolphins, porpoises, minke whales and orcas have been seen offshore. The main species of reptiles and amphibians found at the reserve are viviparous lizards, common frogs and common toads.

== History ==
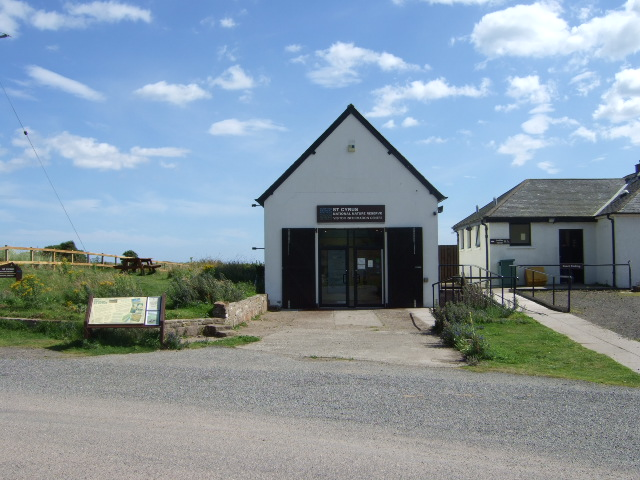
Former lifeboat station, now used as a visitor centre

There are no archaeological remains on the NNR itself, however the reserve almost completely surrounds the old graveyard known as the Nether Kirkyard, which is associated with former church of Ecclesgreig. No trace remains of the church itself, which was consecrated in 1242, although some early gravestones remain in-situ. Also close to the reserve is a cave used by Neolithic people, located in the cliffs adjacent to the visitor centre. Bones found within the cave are believed to come from a midden that was in use between 4,000 and 3,000 BC. The bones were identified as coming from a variety of different creatures, and pieces of pottery and an amulet were also found. The Kaim o' Mathers, a castle thought to have been built in the early 15th Century, lies just to the north of the reserve boundary.

A lifeboat station was built in the 1860s, but a change in course of the North Esk meant that it had gone out of use by the mid-1880s. The building is now used by NatureScot to house the reserve's visitor centre.

== Conservation designations ==
The national nature reserve is classified as a Category II protected area by the International Union for Conservation of Nature. It also forms part of a Site of Special Scientific Interest (SSSI), the St Cyrus and Kinnaber Links SSSI, which covers a wider area than the NNR, being 305 ha in size. As of 2018 NatureScot were considering expanding the area of the NNR to include the foreshore area that is currently managed by Crown Estate Scotland.
