= National nature reserves in Scotland =

Protected area designation in Scotland

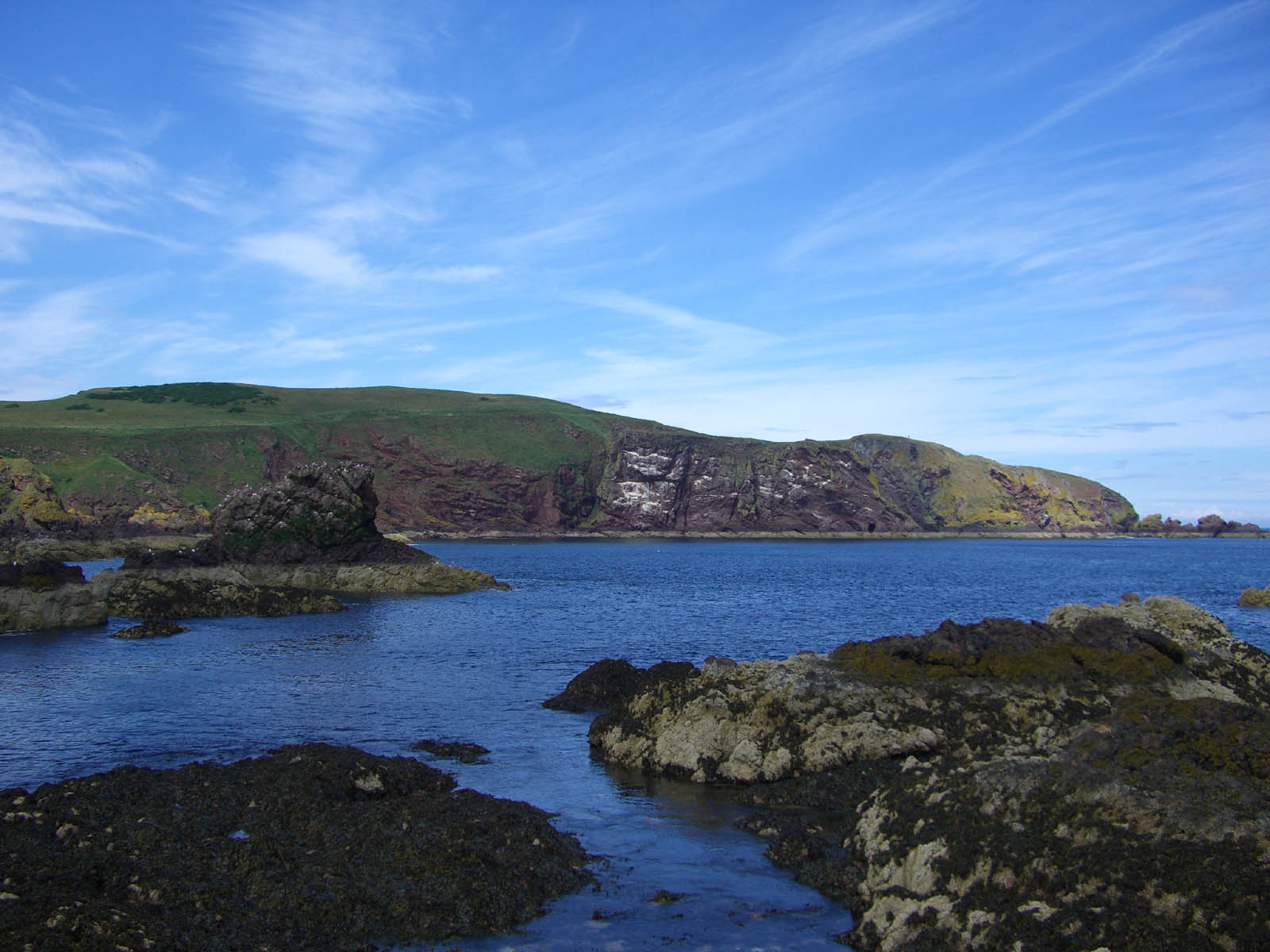
St Abb's Head NNR in Berwickshire, seen from the south near the village of St Abbs.

In Scotland, national nature reserves (NNRs) are designated by NatureScot, and are areas of land or water designated under the Wildlife and Countryside Act 1981 as containing habitats and species of national importance. National nature reserves can be owned by public, private, community or voluntary organisations but must be managed to conserve their important habitats and species, as well as providing opportunities for the public to enjoy and engage with nature. There are currently 44 NNRs in Scotland, with the newest being the Torridon NNR which was designtated in August 2026.

National nature reserve status is an accolade awarded to the best nature reserves in Scotland, and the selected sites provide examples of nationally or internationally important species and habitats. NNRs are intended to showcase Scotland's nature, and as well as being well managed for wildlife they must be managed to provide opportunities for the public to visit and enjoy them. NNRs therefore generally have facilities such as visitor centres and trails to allow visitors to explore and understand the habitats or wildlife they contain. 19 of the reserves NNRs have IUCN Category II (national park) status, including, Glen Affric, Rùm, Abernethy Forest and the Great Trossachs Forest. There are no reserves with this status in England, Wales or Northern Ireland. This is mainly due to Scotland's natural habitats being more intact than in the rest of the UK.

Most NNRs in Scotland are also designated as Sites of Special Scientific Interest. Many also form part of the Natura 2000 network, which covers Special Protection Areas and Special Areas of Conservation. Additionally, some of the NNRs are designated as Ramsar sites. Prior to the addition of the Torridon NNR, NNRs covered 154,250 hectares (1,542.5 km^{2}), or less than 1.5% of the land area of Scotland. They range in size from Corrieshalloch Gorge at 7 ha to Mar Lodge Estate, which covers 29,324 ha.

== History ==
National nature reserves were first created under the National Parks and Access to the Countryside Act 1949. In 1996 the public body responsible for Scotland's natural heritage, Scottish Natural Heritage (SNH – since renamed NatureScot), undertook a review of NNR policy that took account of the availability of other designations conferring legal protection, such as site of special scientific interest, special protection area and special area of conservation. It was determined that NNR should possess four attributes:

- Primacy of nature – conservation must be the primary land use within a NNR: "nature comes first".
- National importance – the conservation value of the habitat, species or feature must be such that it is of national importance that the site be managed as a reserve.
- Best practice management – NNRs must be well managed.
- Continuity of management – a long-term view is required.

Additionally, it was determined that NNRs should be managed for at least one of three purposes:

- Raising public awareness.
- Specialised and pro-active management.
- Offering opportunities for research into the ecology and its management.

Between 2000 and 2003 the existing NNRs were reviewed against these criteria. Prior to 2004 there were 73 national nature reserves in Scotland, however a number have since been de-designated. New NNRs have also been designated, such as the National Trust for Scotland's Glen Coe and Mar Lodge properties, which were both designated NNRs in 2017.

Since 2012 governance of the NNR designation in Scotland has been through a partnership group, comprising representatives of existing reserve management organisations and community land groups, chaired by NatureScot. NatureScot remains responsible for the statutory declaration of national nature reserves.

== Maintenance and management ==
The logo used for Scotland's national nature reserves.

NatureScot is responsible for designating NNRs in Scotland and for overseeing the maintenance and management of each reserve. The majority of NNRs are directly managed by NatureScot; however, some are managed by, or in co-operation with other bodies. The NNR partnership consists of nine bodies:

- Community Land Scotland
- Forestry and Land Scotland (FLS)
- National Trust for Scotland (NTS)
- RSPB Scotland
- Scottish Land and Estates
- NatureScot
- Scottish Wildlife Trust (SWT)
- South Lanarkshire Council
- Woodland Trust Scotland

Details on the management of each reserve are shown in the table below.

== List of national nature reserves in Scotland ==
Name	Region (as defined by NatureScot)	Management
Abernethy Forest	Highlands and Skye	NatureScot / RSPB
Ariundle Oakwood	Highlands and Skye	NatureScot / FLS
Beinn Eighe and Loch Maree Islands	Highlands and Skye	NatureScot
Ben Lawers	Tayside and Fife	NTS
Ben Wyvis	Highlands and Skye	NatureScot / FLS
Blawhorn Moss	Central Belt	NatureScot
Caerlaverock	South of Scotland	NatureScot
Cairnsmore of Fleet	South of Scotland	NatureScot
Clyde Valley Woodlands	Central Belt	NatureScot / SWT / South Lanarkshire Council
Corrie Fee	Tayside and Fife	NatureScot
Corrieshalloch Gorge	Highlands and Skye	NTS
Craigellachie	Highlands and Skye	NatureScot
Creag Meagaidh	Highlands and Skye	NatureScot
Flanders Moss	West Highlands	NatureScot
Forsinard Flows	Highlands and Skye	RSPB
Forvie	Grampian Highlands	NatureScot
Glasdrum Wood	West Highlands	NatureScot
Glen Affric	Highlands and Skye	FLS
Glen Coe	West Highlands	NTS
Glen Nant	West Highlands	FLS
Glen Roy	Highlands and Skye	NatureScot
Glen Tanar	Grampian Highlands	Glen Tanar Estate
Glen More	Highlands and Skye	FLS
The Great Trossachs Forest	West Highlands	RSPB / FLS / Woodland Trust
Hermaness	Northern Isles	NatureScot
Insh Marshes	Highlands and Skye	RSPB
Invereshie and Inshriach	Highlands and Skye	NatureScot / FLS
Isle of May	Tayside and Fife	NatureScot
Knockan Crag	Highlands and Skye	NatureScot
Loch Fleet	Highlands and Skye	NatureScot / SWT
Loch Leven	Tayside and Fife	NatureScot / RSPB
Loch Lomond	West Highlands	NatureScot / Loch Lomond & The Trossachs National Park
Mar Lodge Estate	Grampian Highlands	NTS
Moine Mhòr	West Highlands	NatureScot
Muir of Dinnet	Grampian Highlands	NatureScot
Noss	Northern Isles	NatureScot
Rum	Highlands and Skye	NatureScot
St Abb's Head	South of Scotland	NTS
St Cyrus	Grampian Highlands	NatureScot
St Kilda	Western Isles	NTS
Staffa	West Highlands	NTS
Taynish	West Highlands	NatureScot
Tentsmuir	Tayside and Fife	NatureScot
Torridon	Highlands and Skye	NTS

=== Former NNRs, de-declared since 2004 ===
- Braehead Moss, de-declared on 9 December 2011
- Ben Lui, de-declared on 18 May 2018
- Caenlochan, de-declared in 2005, although Corrie Fee remains a national nature reserve
- Claish Moss, de-declared on 1 March 2012
- Cragbank Woods, de-declared on 20 December 2012
- Den of Airlie, de-declared on 20 December 2012
- Eilean Na Muice Duibhe, Islay
- Glencripesdale, de-declared on 1 March 2012
- Inchnadamph, delisted as a national nature reserve in 2009
- Inverpolly, de-declared in 2004, although Knockan Crag remains a national nature reserve
- Keen of Hamar, de-declared on 13 July 2012
- Kirkconnell Flow, de-declared on 18 May 2018
- Loch a' Mhuilinn
- Loch Druidibeg, de-declared on 1 March 2012
- Mealdarroch, de-declared on 9 December 2011
- Monach Islands, de-declared on 18 May 2018
- Morrone Birkwood
- Morton Lochs, now part of Tentsmuir NNR
- Nigg and Udale Bays, de-declared on 9 December 2011
- Rannoch Moor, de-declared on 1 March 2012
- Rassal Ashwood, de-declared on 31 March 2014
- Rona and Sula Sgeir, de-declared on 18 May 2018
- Silver Flowe, de-declared on 18 May 2018
- Tynron Juniper Wood
- Whitlaw Mosses, de-declared on 18 May 2018

== See also ==
- National nature reserve (United Kingdom)
- National nature reserves in England
- National nature reserves in Wales
- Nature reserves in Northern Ireland
