= Tentsmuir Forest =

Forest in north east Fife, Scotland

Coordinates: 56°25′22″N 2°49′40″W

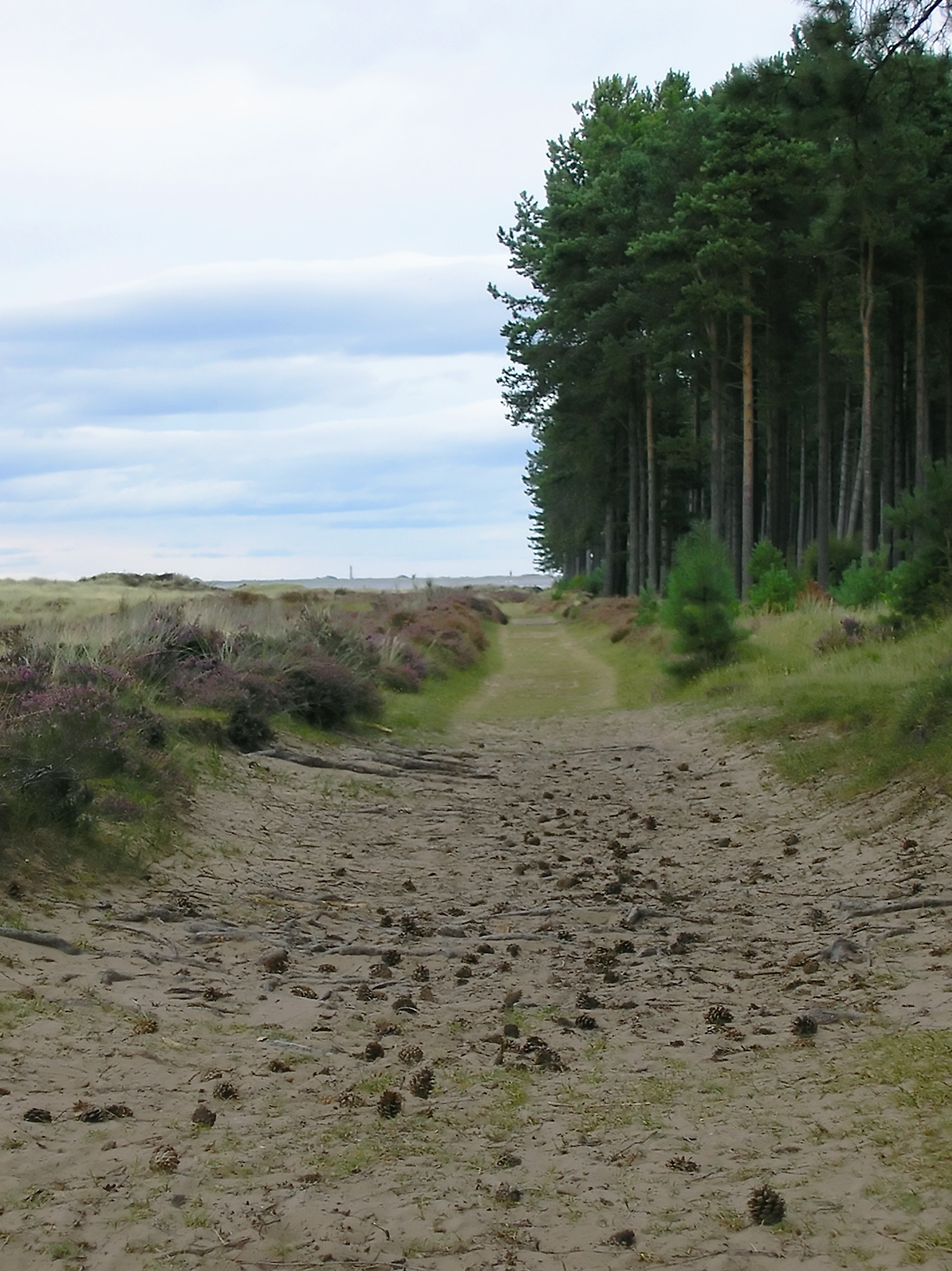
Tentsmuir Forest

Tentsmuir Forest is in north east Fife, Scotland. Covering some 5 square miles (13 km^{2}), the forest was originally sand dunes and moorland before acquisition by the Forestry Commission in the 1920s. The forest consists mainly of Scots pine and Corsican pine, and is now owned by Forestry and Land Scotland, successor body to the Forestry Commission.

Pollen and soil analyses indicate that throughout the fifth century the Calluna-dominated heath that covered the sandy soil at Tentsmuir was repeatedly burned to stimulate grass growth, and that the resultant pasture was grazed extensively. This ended abruptly in the sixth century when the pastureland was overwhelmed by an overwhelming sand-blow episode.

Three parts of the area, Morton Lochs, Tentsmuir Point and Tayport Heath are managed by NatureScot, and are now designated as Tentsmuir National Nature Reserve, with Tentsmuir Forest covering most of the land between the three portions of the NNR.

Tentsmuir is notable for the many concrete blocks known as 'Dragon's Teeth' distributed along the shoreline, which acted as coastal defence against landing craft during World War II. The nearby Leuchars Station means that military aircraft are often seen (and heard), but aviation links go back to 1911 with the setting up of a Royal Engineers training camp. During World War II, troops of the Polish Army were based here to staff the coastal defences.

Also of interest is a 19th-century icehouse, historically used to store salmon but now an important artificial bat roost. Red squirrels can be found at Morton Lochs.

== See also ==
- Tentsmuir National Nature Reserve
