= Tentsmuir National Nature Reserve =

Nature reserve in Fife, Scotland

- IUCN category IV (habitat/species management area)
- Looking towards Tentsmuir Forest from the coast near Tentsmuir Point

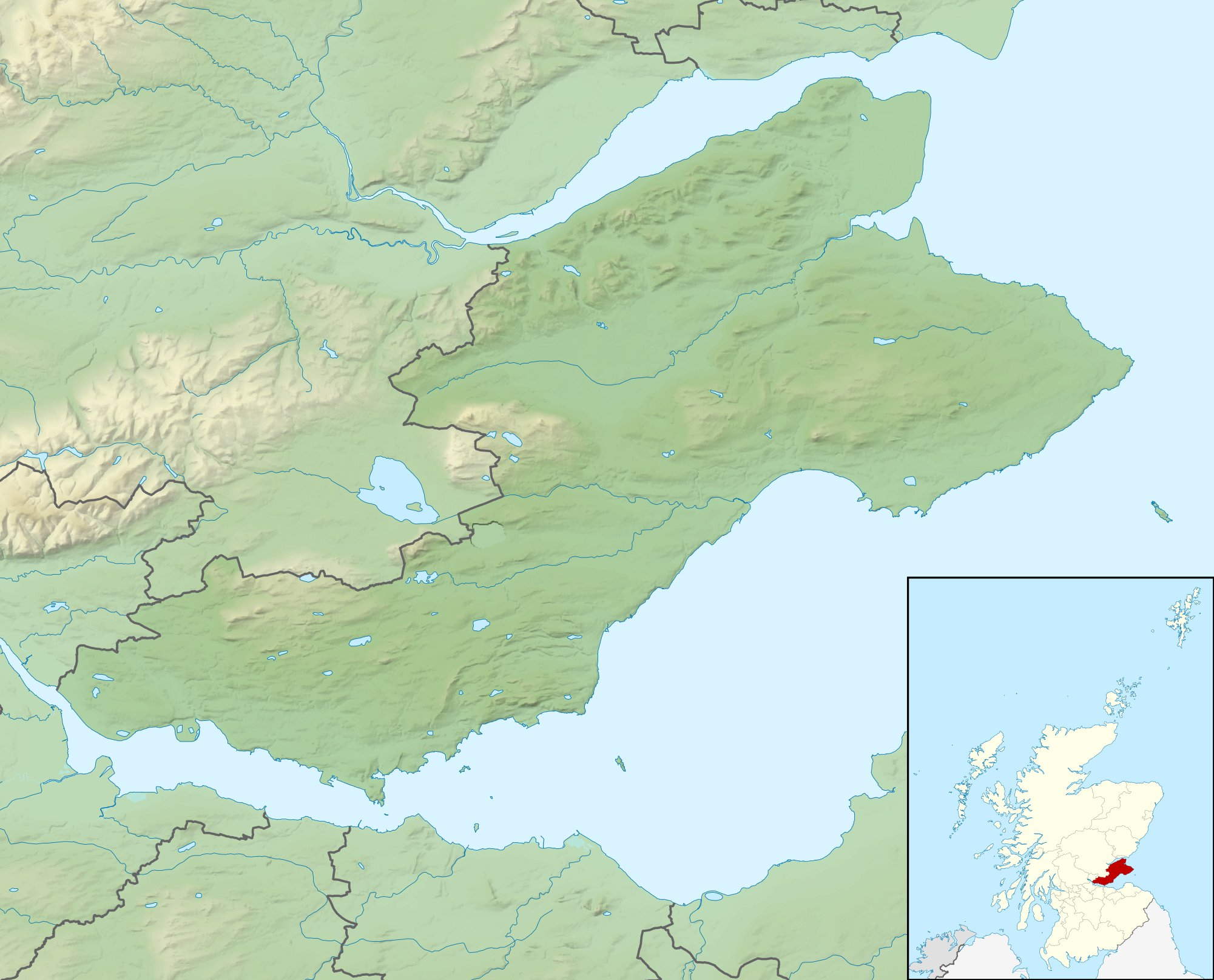
- Location within Fife
- Location: Fife, Scotland
- Coordinates: 56.42°N 2.83°W
- Area: 564 ha (1,390 acres)
- Established: 2006
- Governing body: NatureScot
- Website: Tentsmuir NNR

Tentsmuir National Nature Reserve (NNR) is located southeast of Tayport in Fife, Scotland. The reserve is made up of three parts, encompassing Morton Lochs, Tentsmuir Point and Tayport Heath, and is managed by NatureScot. The different sections of Tentsmuir NNR were originally designated as separate national nature reserves at different times: the Morton Lochs section was designated in 1952; Tentsmuir Point in 1954; and Tayport Heath in 1988. While these discrete sections are distant from one another, they form part of the extensive dune system at Tentsmuir, and in 2003 SNH combined the three sites to form Tentsmuir National Nature Reserve. The adjoining Tentsmuir Forest is managed by Forestry and Land Scotland and covers most of the land between the three portions of the NNR.

In October 2020 Tentsmuir was one of the sites used for the filming of the BBC's Autumnwatch series, with presenter Michaela Strachan being based at the site for the programme's two week run.

== Geomorphology ==
The dune system at Tentsmuir NNR is highly dynamic, with some areas of the coast experiencing erosion and some areas accumulating sand. Much of the sandbank and mud-flat system, known as the Abertay Sands, which extends eastwards into the North Sea, was formed only in the past 100 years through processes of erosion and deposition.

Tentsmuir is a key geomorphological site for the study of active beach and coastal processes, in particular those associated with coastal progradation (shoreline building out seawards). The site supports an extensive and relatively undisturbed area of intertidal sand, mudflats and rapidly accreting lime-poor dunes. There are complete sequences of sand dune and slack communities from strandline, saltmarsh, accreting "yellow" dunes, fixed "grey dunes" to lichen rich dune heath, dune slack and dune slack woodland. Associated with these habitats are a large number of plant and invertebrate species including many of national or regional importance.

== Flora ==
Looking south from the beach near the Ice House entrance

The different sections of Tentsmuir NNR support a rich variety of plant species, and 320 vascular plant species have been recorded at Tentsmuir Point, with over 200 recorded at Morton Lochs. At Morton Lochs, water plantain, yellow flag iris, broad-leaved pondweed and greater pond sedge are just some of the plants that thrive in the mosaic of habitats in this area. The wet woodland surrounding Morton Lochs consists mainly of grey willow, alder, hawthorn and birch. Land to the north and east of Morton Lochs displays some of the natural vegetation characteristic of open heath, despite being planted with forest in 1954.

== Fauna ==
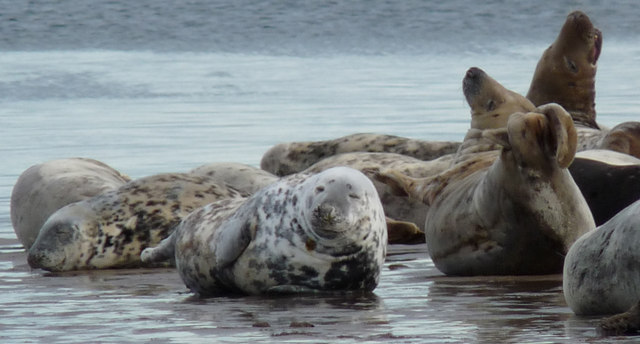
Grey seals hauled-out near Tentsmuir Point

The sea off the reserve hosts a nationally important colony of common seals, and Tentsmuir Point provides a haul-out site for grey seals. It is one of the few places where both species can be seen together. Bottlenose dolphins are also often seen from the shore at Tentsmuir, and there are less frequent sightings of minke whales and harbour porpoises. Otters have been seen at the Morton Lochs section of the NNR, with the existence of young otters suggesting successful breeding in the area.

Tentsmuir Point is also renowned as one of the most important sites for migratory waders and wildfowl in Scotland, and the intertidal flats regularly support large concentrations of passing or wintering waterfowl and waders. Three species have been recorded at nationally important numbers (between 2004 and 2009). There were eider (11.45% of the UK population), bar-tailed godwit (1.93%) and goosander (1.04%). The wetland habitat at Morton Lochs also provides a home for birds like the water rail, the little grebe, the tufted duck and the goldeneye. Ospreys can also be found at Morton Lochs, as well as the rare marsh harrier.

Invertebrate fauna in the sand-dune area of Tentsmuir NNR are particularly diverse, with 46 nationally rare or scarce species.

Red squirrels can be found at Morton Lochs.

== Designations ==
Tentsmuir national nature reserve is classified as a Category IV protected area by the International Union for Conservation of Nature. In addition to its NNR status, the reserve forms part of a range of national and international protected areas along the coastline of the Firth of Tay and the Eden Estuary. This wider area is classified as a Special Area of Conservation (SAC), a Special Protection Area (SPA), and a Ramsar Wetland of International Importance. The NNR also overlaps with two Sites of Special Scientific Interest (SSSI), with part of the Tentsmuir Coast SSSI and all of Morton Lochs SSSI lying within the reserve.
