= Glasdrum Wood =

Nature reserve in Argyll and Bute, Scotland

Glasdrum Wood National Nature Reserve
- IUCN category IV (habitat/species management area)
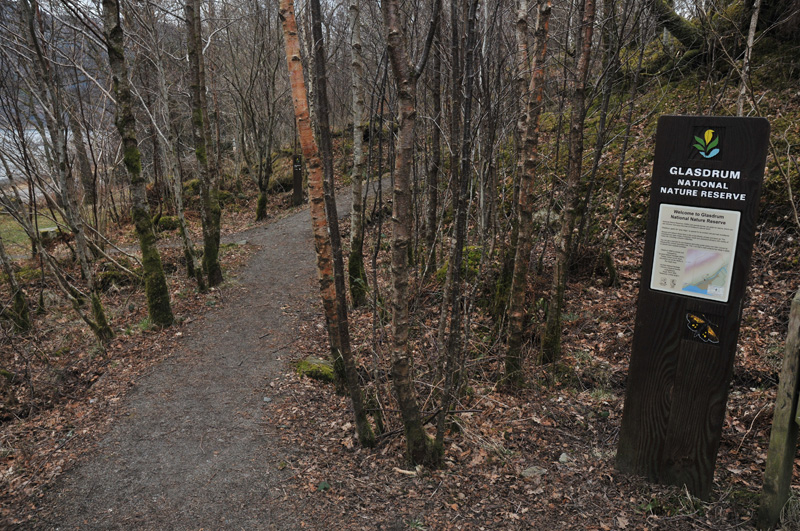

- Location within Argyll and Bute
- Location: Appin, Argyll and Bute, Scotland
- Coordinates: 56.5586°N 5.2544°W
- Area: 169 ha (420 acres)
- Established: 1967; 59 years ago
- Governing body: NatureScot
- Website: Glasdrum Wood National Nature Reserve

Glasdrum Wood (Scottish Gaelic: Coille a’ Ghlasdroma) is national nature reserve (NNR) at the head of Loch Creran in Argyll and Bute on the west coast of Scotland. Managed by NatureScot, the wood is renowned for its diverse flora and fauna, including sessile oak and ash trees, mosses, liverworts and rare invertebrates, like the chequered skipper butterfly. The NNR covers an area of around 169 hectares, encompassing woodland and hillside on the lower slopes of Beinn Churlain. A carpark and 1 km-long waymarked trail are provided for visitors. Since 2004 the reserve has received approximately 2800 visitors each year.

== History ==
Glasdrum has been actively managed by people since at least the 17th century and probably from much earlier. The remains of charcoal platforms and a limekiln, which date from the 18th and 19th centuries provide evidence of industrial activity that required large quantities of wood. During this period Glasdrum was managed by coppicing, under a system by which scattered mature oak and ash trees and were left standing, with the intervening space used to allow oak and other underwood to be cut at 10-15 year intervals. Oak was the favoured species, due its strength, and the fact that bark could be used in the tanning process. Species such as birch, alder, willow and hazel were known as "black woods", which were often not considered worth protecting.

The woods at Loch Creran were acquired by the Forestry Commission in the 1950s and early 1960s. The commission enclosed part of Glasdrum Wood with a deer fence, and began to clear the deciduous woodland to plant conifer species. In 1962 the Nature Conservancy Council (NCC), predecessor to NatureScot, leased a 17-ha area alongside the road to protect the native woodland. This land was purchased by the NCC and declared a national nature reserve in 1967. In 1976, the NCC purchased a further 152 ha of the adjoining land, which was declared an extension of the national nature reserve a year later. All land in the Glasdrum Wood National Nature Reserve is now owned by NatureScot.

== Flora and fauna ==
Glasdrum Wood NNR comprises ancient sessile oakwoods, interspersed with ash, birch and alder. Lying within the Glen Creran Woods Site of Special Scientific Interest and Special Area of Conservation, the region has an outstanding variety of lichen species, including four globally-vulnerable species and 66 nationally scarce species. The climate and humid woodland habitat also provide good conditions for mosses and liverworts to thrive.

Glasdrum NNR has an impressive range of invertebrate species and is renowned as one of the best butterfly sites in Scotland, with 21 of the 34 species recorded in Scotland present at the reserve. This includes the rare chequered skipper butterfly, a priority United Kingdom Biodiversity Action Plan species that was declared extinct in England in 1976. Over 200 moth species have also been recorded at the reserve, including some nationally scarce species such as the barred tooth-striped.

== Other designations ==
Glasdrum Wood forms part of the c. 700 ha Glen Creran Woods, which are protected as both a Site of Special Scientific Interest and a Special Area of Conservation. The NNR is designated a Category IV protected area by the International Union for Conservation of Nature.
