= Silver Flowe-Merrick Kells =

Coordinates: 55.1000°N 4.5000°W

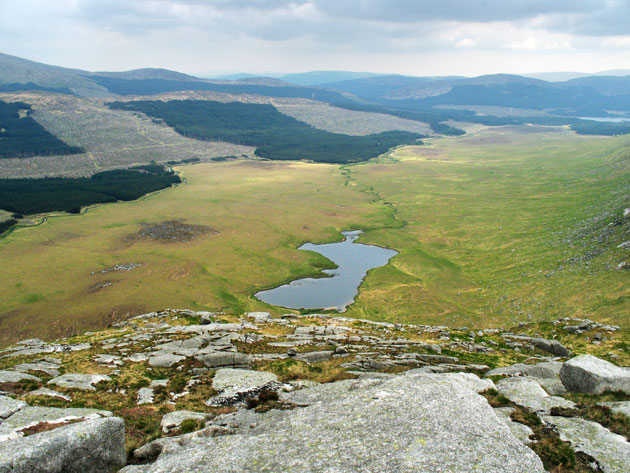
Silver Flowe from Dungeon Hill.

Situated in south-west Scotland, the Silver Flowe-Merrick Kells biosphere reserve is composed of two separate sites.

Silver Flowe is a unique bog formation and one of the least interrupted undisturbed mire systems in Europe. Its high value is principally due to the landscape pattern of an assemblage of discrete mires. It is also a breeding site for the rare Azure Hawker dragonfly. Silver Flowe is also designated as Ramsar site.

Merrick Kells contains three habitats of European interest: blanket bog, montane acid grasslands, and wet heath with cross-leaved heath. There are mires supporting various communities, and the area has a wide variety of species but low population levels. There are nationally important breeding bird populations, and important invertebrate populations. The site is the largest remaining unafforested area of upland in Galloway.

Both sites are surrounded by commercial coniferous forestry. The management of Merrick Kells and Silver Flowe is mainly carried out through non-intervention, apart from areas where extensive livestock grazing is practised in order to manage vegetation.

Proposals made in the periodic review for extending this reserve to meet the Seville criteria are being considered.

== Major habitats & land cover types ==
The mire is dominated by Trichophoreto-Eriophoretum including Sphagnum plumulosum, Drosera anglica, Pleurozia purpurea and Campylopus atrovirens; submontane vegetation including Molinietum and damp Callunetum; rocks with grassy cover supporting Nardus spp. and Juncus squarrosus.

== Sources ==
This article incorporates text from a free content work (license statement/permission). Text taken from UNESCO - MAB Biosphere Reserves Directory, UNESCO, UNESCO.
