= Blawhorn Moss =

Protected area in West Lothian, Scotland

Blawhorn Moss National Nature Reserve
- IUCN category IV (habitat/species management area)
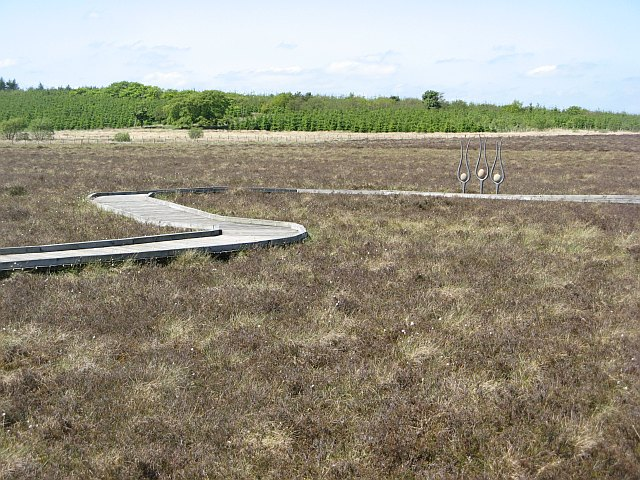
- Boardwalk in Blawhorn Moss National Nature Reserve

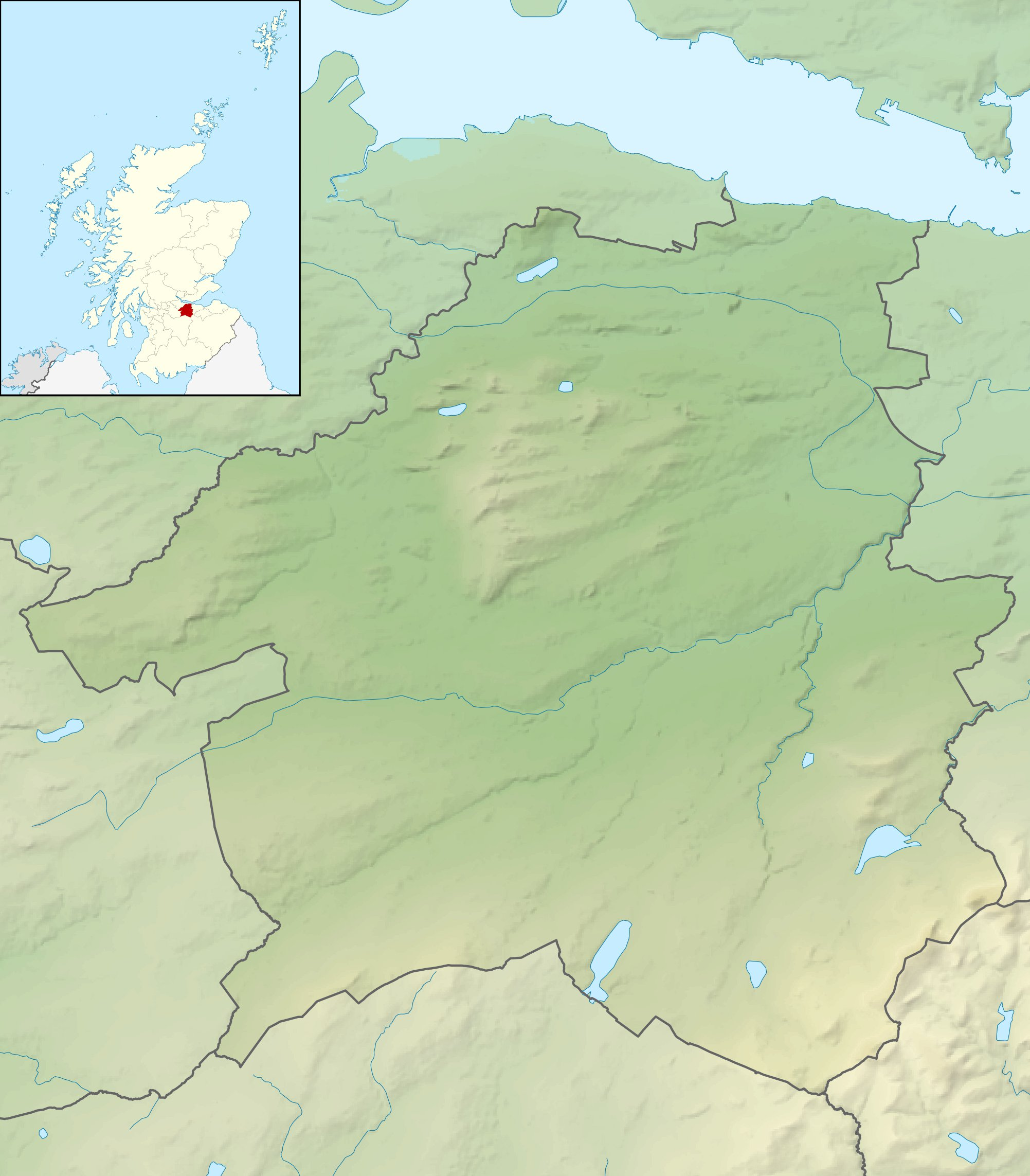
- Location within West Lothian
- Location: Blackridge, West Lothian, Scotland
- Coordinates: 55.894016°N 3.785450°W
- Area: 108 hectares (270 acres)
- Governing body: NatureScot
- Website: Blawhorn Moss National Nature Reserve

Blawhorn Moss is a raised bog located to the northwest of the village of Blackridge, about 6 kilometres (3.7 mi) west of Armadale in the council area of West Lothian in central Scotland. It is the largest and least disturbed raised bog in the Lothians, and has been a National Nature Reserve since 1980. It is owned and managed by NatureScot, the public body responsible for Scotland's natural heritage.

The reserve is classified as a Category IV protected area by the International Union for Conservation of Nature, and is also designated as both a Special Area of Conservation and a Site of Special Scientific Interest.

== Flora and fauna ==
Blawhorn Moss provides an important habitat for wildlife and supports many of the plant species representative of bog habitat. A number of sphagnum mosses grow here, as well as heather, crowberry, hare's-tail cotton grass and common cotton grass.

A variety of bird species breed on the moss, including red grouse, snipe, curlew and redshank. stonechat, skylark, and meadow pipit are also regularly seen in the spring and summer months at the reserve, along with a variety of butterfly, dragonfly and damselfly species.

As an example of a raised bog, Blawhorn Moss is the largest and least disturbed area of peatland in the Lothians. As well as providing important habitat for wildlife, such as moorland breeding birds, healthy peatlands absorb carbon, forming what is often referred to as a natural carbon sink. In Scotland, peat soils are thought to contain nearly twenty five times more carbon than all other plant life in the UK. Yet very few raised bogs in Central Scotland remain undamaged, as most have been affected by drainage for farming, forestry or by extensive peat cutting.

== History ==
In the 1940s, the whole surface of Blawhorn Moss was drained to make the site more appropriate for agriculture. The moss then passed into the ownership of the National Coal Board: the surrounding areas were subjected to opencast coal mining, however the area of the current NNR remained intact. The Nature Conservancy Council (the predecessor organisation to NatureScot) purchased 69 hectares (170 acres) of the western part of the moss in 1979, since when the management of Blawhorn Moss has aimed at actively improving the habitat of the moss through blocking the man-made drains that had allowed the water table in the area to drop, and which had left the area more susceptible to drought and fire. Fire damage occurring between the 1980s and 2001 further exacerbated the problem, leading to severe over-drying. A fire in 2001 damaged some of the dams which were replaced with stronger plastic pile dams braced with timber. Further land was purchased in 2001, and in 2008 the reserve was formerly extended to cover this additional 40 hectares (99 acres).

== Visitors ==
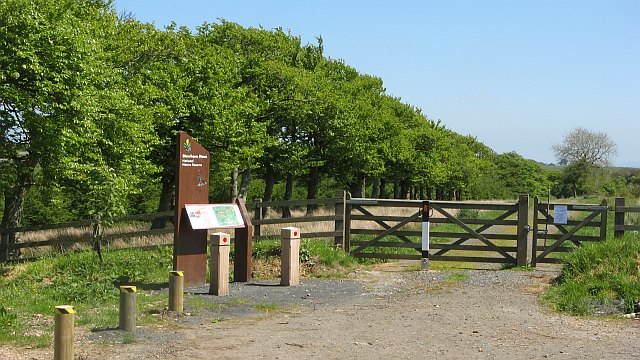
Car park at Blawhorn Moss National Nature Reserve

One of the key function of Scotland's National Nature Reserves is to raise public awareness of the country's habitats and species. There are paths in and around the reserve, linking the reserve into the local path network surrounding Blackridge, and providing access from a carpark for visitors arriving by car. Interpretative signage is provided at the car park and at a viewpoint overlooking the moss. NatureScot have produced a leaflet promoting the reserve to visitors.
