= Loch Creran =

Sea loch in Argyll and Bute, Scotland

Loch Creran MPA
- IUCN category IV (habitat/species management area)
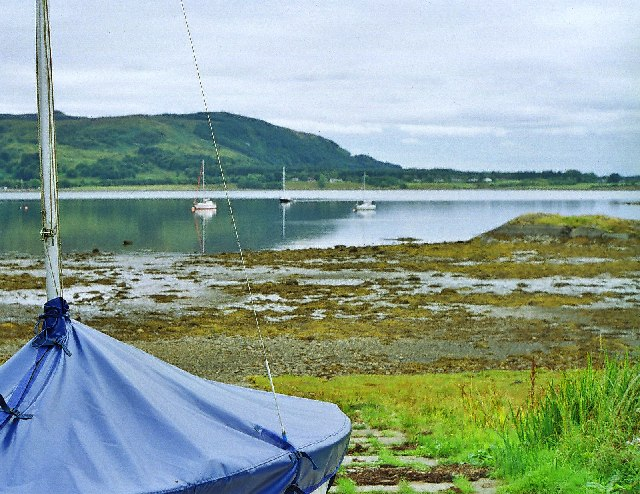

- Location within Argyll and Bute
- Location: Argyll and Bute, Scotland
- Coordinates: 56°31′39″N 5°20′21″W
- Area: 1,200 ha (4.6 sq mi)
- Designation: Scottish Government
- Established: 2014
- Operator: Marine Scotland

Loch Creran is a sea loch in Argyll and Bute, on the west coast of Scotland. It is about 10 kilometres (6.2 mi) long from its head at Invercreran to its mouth on the Lynn of Lorne, part of Loch Linnhe. The loch separates the areas of Benderloch to the south and Appin to the north. The island of Eriska lies at the mouth of the loch. The loch is bridged at its narrowest point at Creagan, by the A828 road. The village of Barcaldine lies on the south shore of the loch.

The loch narrows and becomes shallower at both Eriska and Creagan, meaning that tidal currents are accelerated through these points. This provides aeration and nutrition to the beds of flame shell and horse mussel that are a feature of the loch. Between these shallow zones lie deeper basins in which the water is more still, proving a habitat for Norway lobster and seapen. In 2014 the entire loch (an area of 1,200 hectares (12 km^{2})) was declared a Nature Conservation Marine Protected Area, to protect its flame shell beds and quaternary geological features. Within the MPA the use of fishing gear that may damage the seabed is prohibited, although rod and line fishing and creeling is permitted. The MPA is designated a Category IV protected area by the International Union for Conservation of Nature, and is also protected as a Special Area of Conservation.

At the head of Loch Creran lies the Glasdrum Wood national nature reserve, an internationally important atlantic oakwood managed by Scottish Natural Heritage, classified as both a Special Area of Conservation and a Site of Special Scientific Interest. This predominantly ash and oak woodland is home to butterflies like the rare chequered skipper, as well as being frequented by otters. The River Creran flows into Loch Creran by this reserve.
