= Morton Lochs =

Protected area in Fife, Scotland

Morton Lochs SSSI
- IUCN category IV (habitat/species management area)
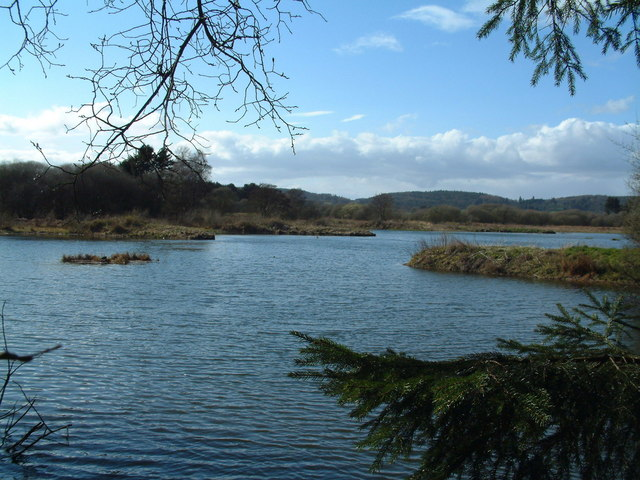

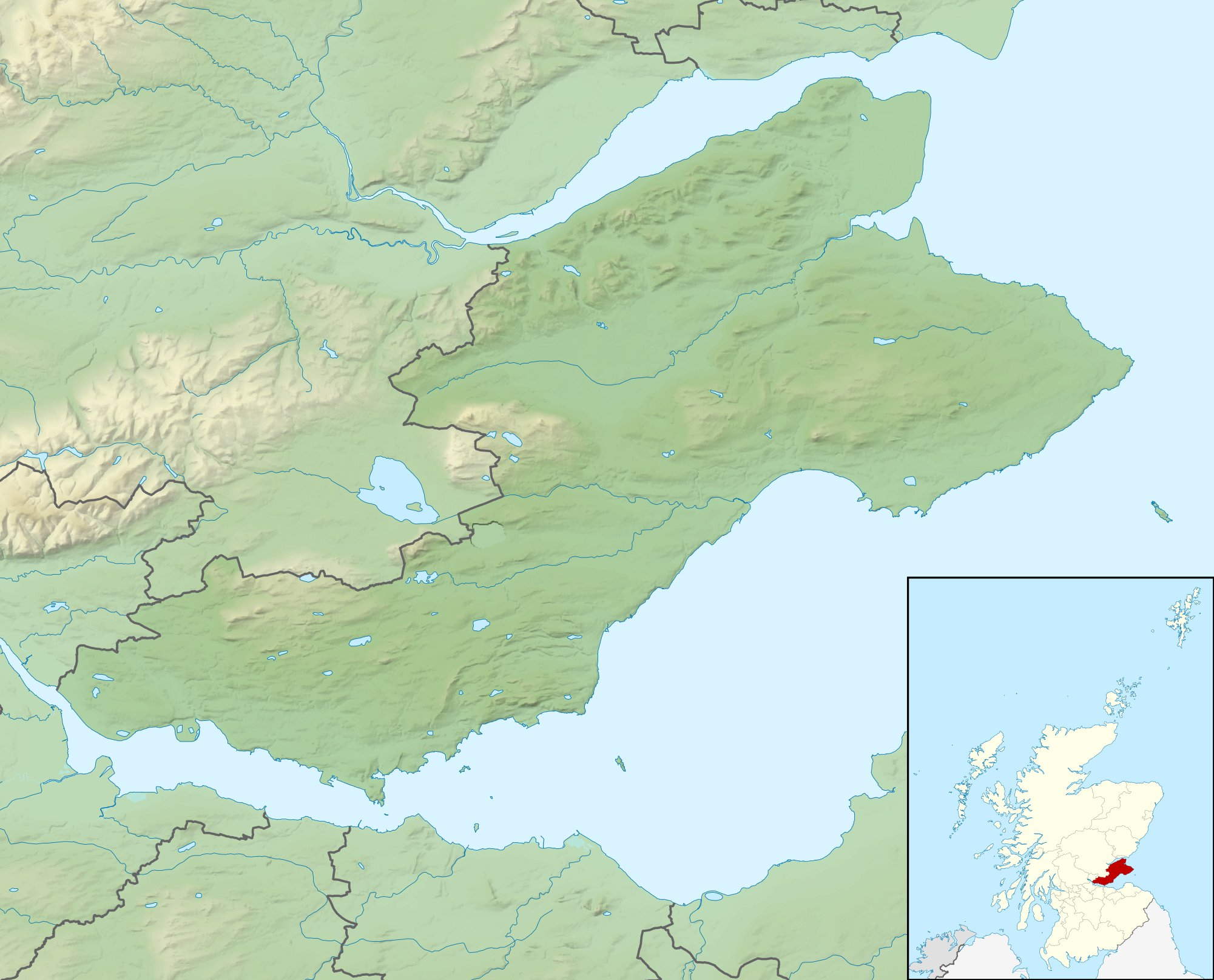
- Location within Fife
- Location: Fife, Scotland
- Nearest city: Tayport
- Coordinates: 56°25′37″N 2°52′26″W
- Area: 52.8 ha (130 acres)
- Established: 1952
- Governing body: NatureScot

Morton Lochs is part of Tentsmuir National Nature Reserve located near Tayport, in the north east of Fife, Scotland. It consists of three small lochs important for a variety of waterfowl species. As well as being a national nature reserve (NNR) the lochs are also designated as a Site of Special Scientific Interest (SSSI) in their own right, and are classified as a Category IV protected area by the International Union for Conservation of Nature.

Access to the nature reserve can be gained from the public footpath through Scotscraig golf course in Tayport, from the many footpaths in Tentsmuir Forest, or by road by turning off towards Morton on the B945 between Tayport and Leuchars. There is a small car park beside the reserve which is close to the two main footpaths. Surrounding the lochs are three bird hides that are accessible for public use, and another hide that requires a key available from NatureScot. Three of the hides sit on the largest of the three lochs with the other being on the South Loch.

== History ==
Morton Lochs is not a naturally occurring wetland system; it was made by local land owners, the Christie family, in 1906. They initially flooded this area of dune heath for fishing, but it quickly became an important centre for wintering wildfowl. Perhaps the most notable visitor is the teal, which comes in its hundreds at times according to entries made in the record book in the hide. The teal is also the emblem for the NNR, and appears on signs at the entrance to the reserve. Morton Lochs was defined as an NNR in 1952, at the time being the second NNR in the UK.

== Biodiversity ==
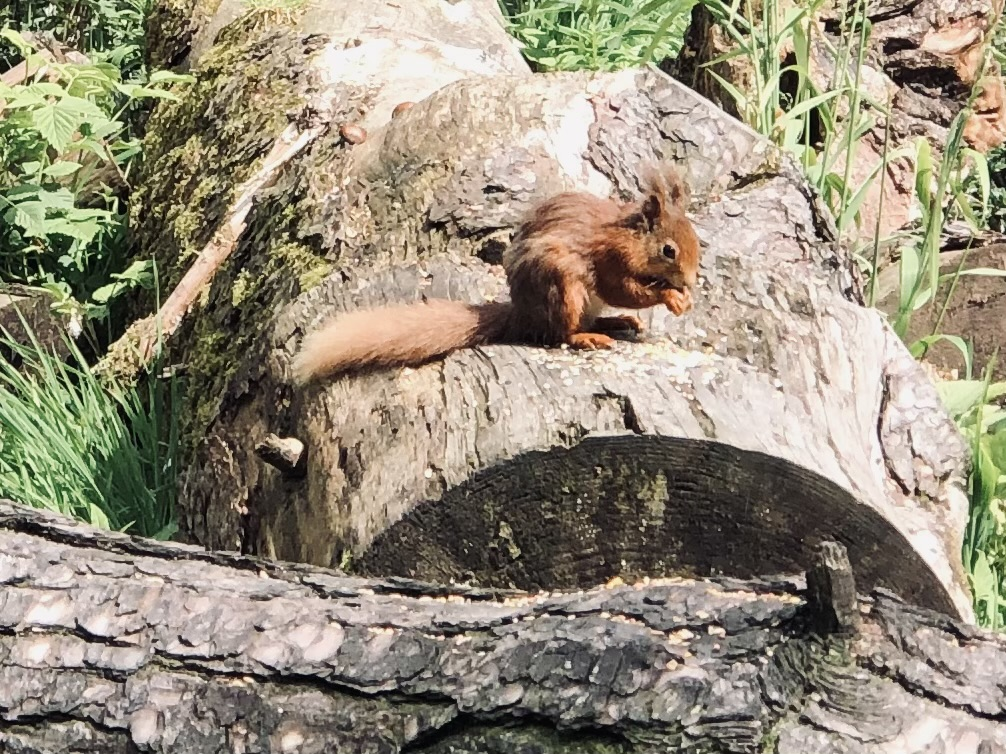
Red Squirrel at Morton Lochs (2021)

The surrounding woodland of Morton Lochs and Tentsmuir are an important habitat for the red squirrel, which can often be seen right outside the John Berry hide. Bird feeders are placed around the woodland and outside the John Berry hide and attract a range of tits, finches and great spotted woodpecker.

Wildfowl visitors to the loch include water rail, goldeneye, little grebe, Eurasian teal, mallard, moorhen, greylag goose, mute swan and many more. Other sightings have included kingfisher, marsh harrier, osprey and Eurasian otters.

== See also ==
- Tentsmuir Forest
- Tentsmuir National Nature Reserve
