= Loch Druidibeg =

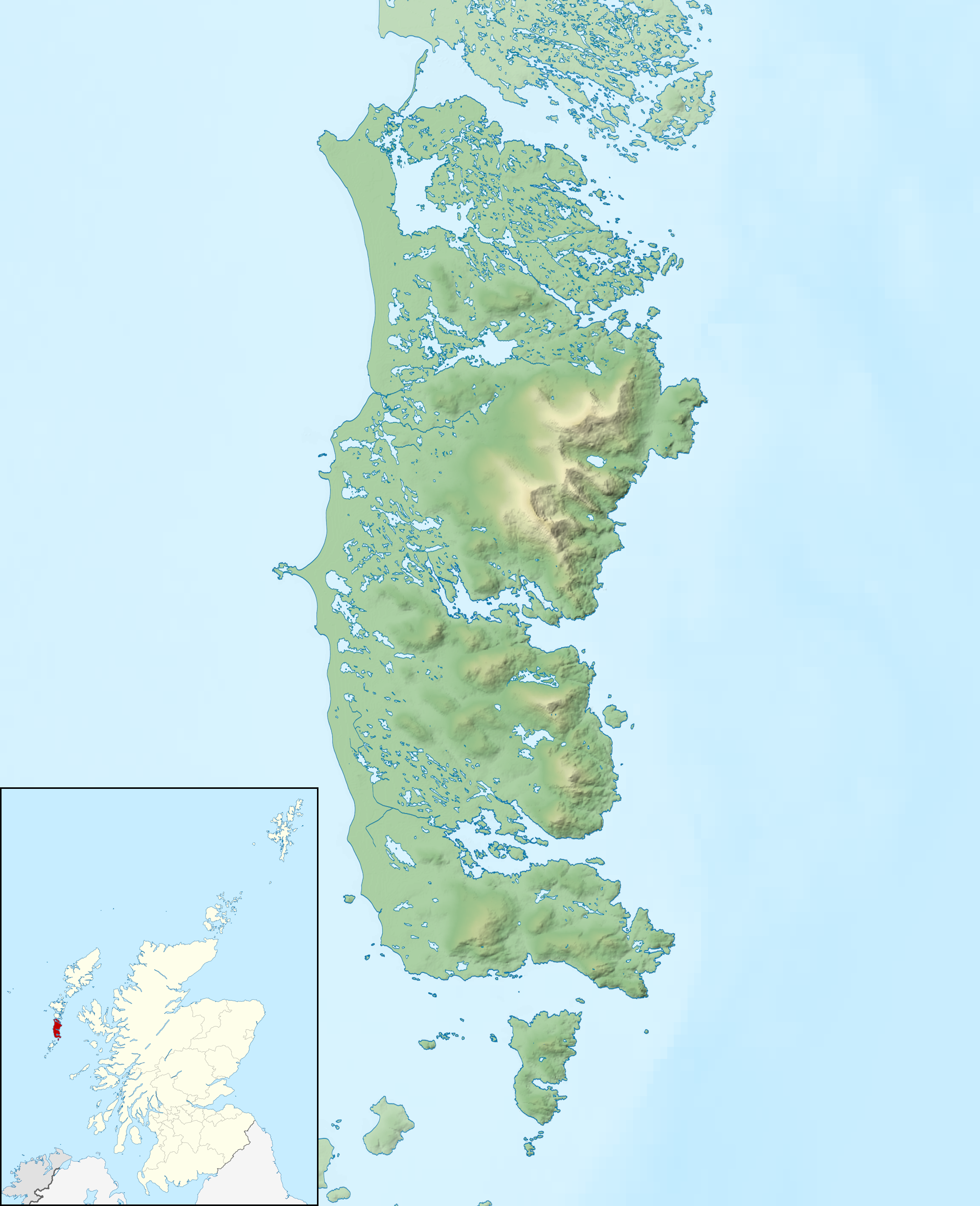
- Location within South Uist
- Location: South Uist, Outer Hebrides, Scotland
- Coordinates: 57.3155°N 7.3254°W
- Type: loch

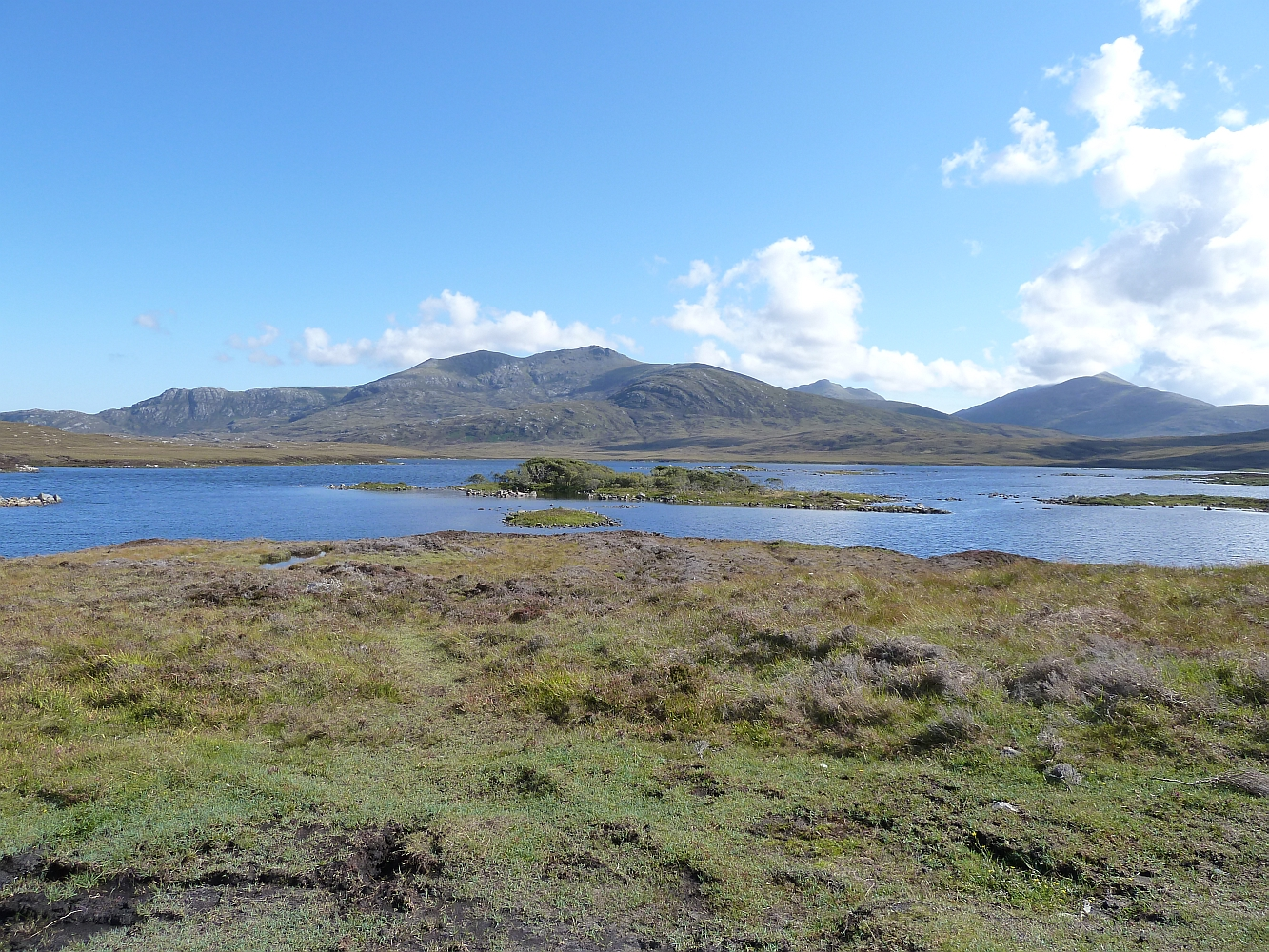

Loch Druidibeag is a freshwater loch situated on the island of South Uist, in the Outer Hebrides of Scotland. The loch is near the northern end of the island, to the north-east of Howmore and to the east of the A865 road and south of the B890.

The loch is a Site of Special Scientific Interest and a Ramsar site, and forms part of the South Uist Machair Special Area of Conservation and the South Uist Machair and Lochs Special Protection Area. Loch Druidibeg was designated as a National Nature Reserve (NNR), but was de-declared in 2012. The loch was also formerly a biosphere reserve, being so-designated in 1976, but this status was withdrawn in 2013. The local planning authority is Comhairle nan Eilean Siar.

== Ecology and management ==
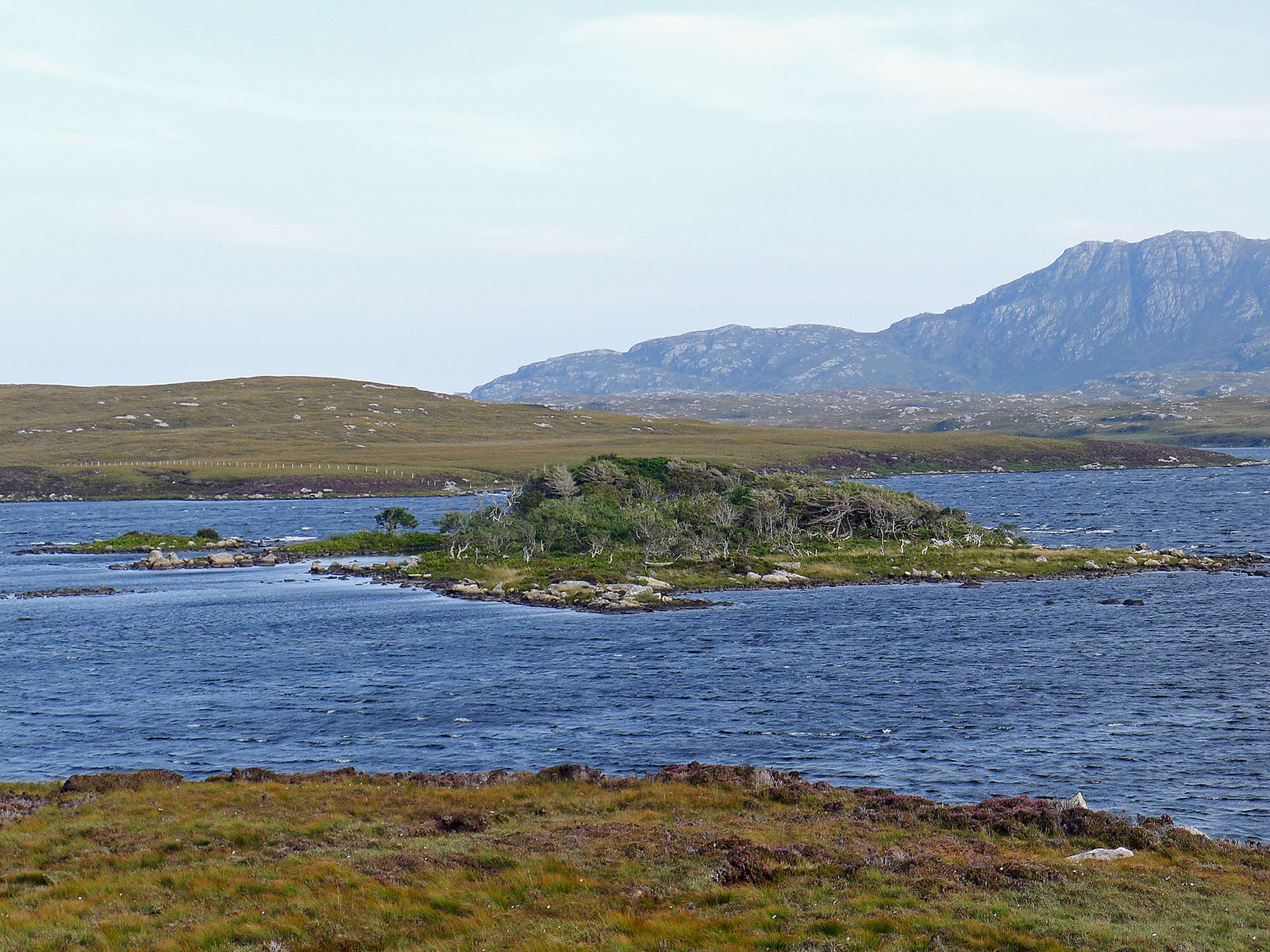

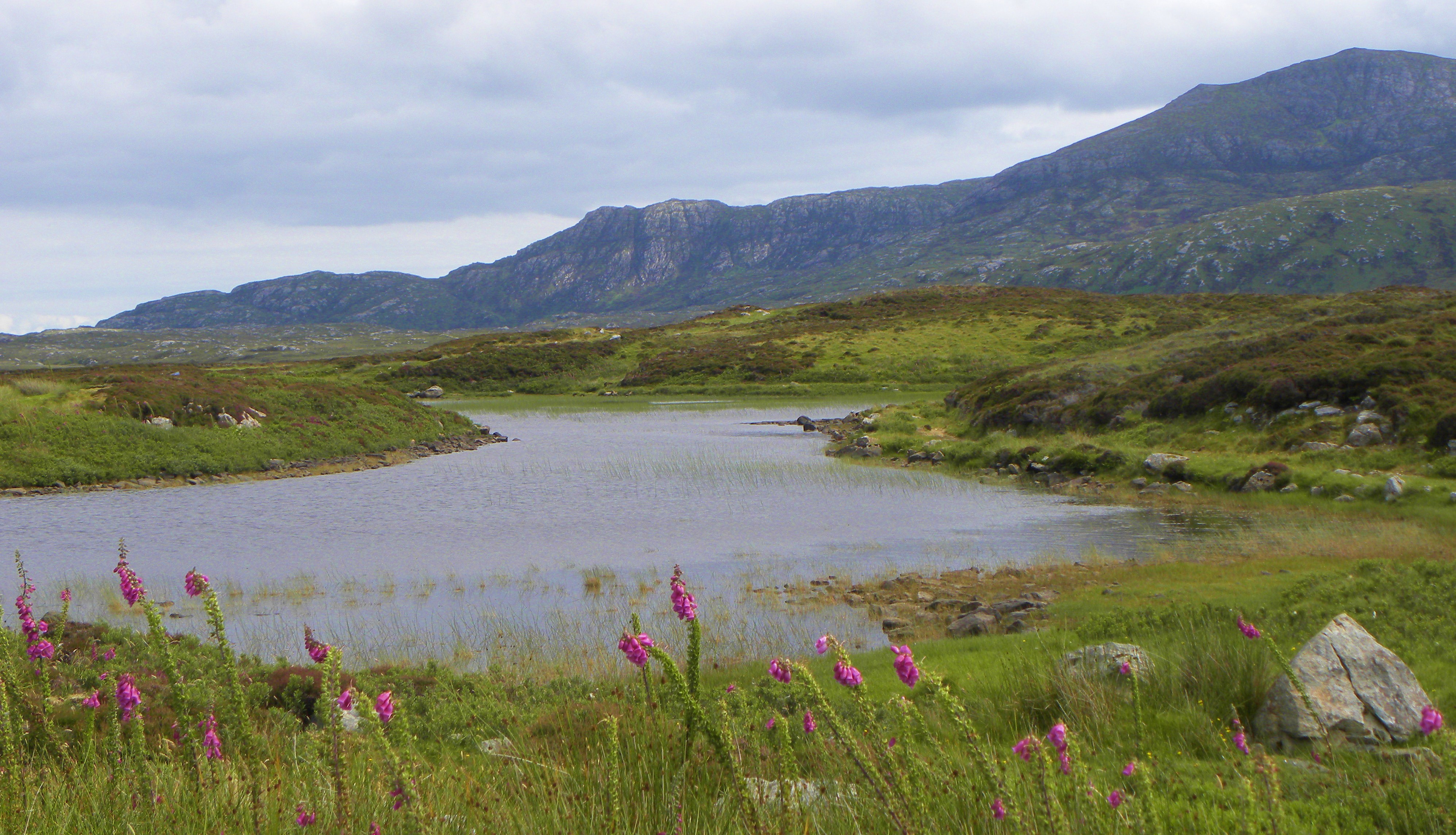

Loch Druidibeg exhibits a cross-section of habitats from alkaline machair grassland through oligotrophic loch to acidic moorland. This highly diverse range of habitats is variously influenced by the oceanic exposure with high levels of salt spray and humidity, and the influence of settled agriculture on which the species-rich machair grassland depends. The loch is managed for strict conservation purposes, however traditional cultivation and cattle grazing practices are encouraged as an integral part of management for biodiversity. Numerous cooperative projects between conservation agencies and the local community in the Uists are carried out. Although no special research and education facilities are available, the reserve is frequently used for scientific and conservation-orientated research as well as for environmental education of schoolchildren.

== Woodland ==
Prior to the creation of the NNR, a small woodland plantation was established to the north of the loch as policies for an estate lodge which was never built. It contained an eccentric mix of lodgepole pine, Scots pine of unknown provenance, Chile pine, Norway maple and Rhododendron ponticum. In the intervening period, native species such as birch, alder, hazel, rowan and aspen have been planted or become established and it is now an important site for woodland birds, which are otherwise scarce in the Hebrides. In the 1980s, Scottish Conservation Project volunteers were contracted by the Nature Conservancy Council to erect a deer fence to protect the plantation from grazing pressure. By the 1990s, the Rhododendron ponticum had engulfed large areas of the plantation and was spreading onto adjacent land and some of the islands in Loch Druidibeg. Scottish Natural Heritage Area Officer, Gail Churchill, responded by initiating a plan for the restoration of the woodland for educational and amenity purposes.

== Ownership ==
The area, in total, is 1,677 hectares (4,140 acres). 1,043 hectares (2,580 acres) of freshwater and moorland, with some croftland, was owned by Scottish Natural Heritage (bought in 1958); 643 hectares (1,590 acres) acquired in 1962 under a management agreement with the owners South Uist Estates and the crofters occupying and managing the croftland/grazings. In 2018 the SNH land was transferred to the local community-owned company Storas Uibhist.

There are buffer zones extending 10 miles (16 km) to 15 miles (24 km) north and south of the zone, under similar schemes.

== Sources ==
This article incorporates text from a free content work (license statement/permission). Text taken from UNESCO - MAB Biosphere Reserves Directory, UNESCO, UNESCO.
