= River Creran =

River in Argyll and Bute, Scotland

Coordinates: 56°33′14″N 5°15′42″W

The River Creran is a river in Argyllshire, Scotland. Its headwaters are on the slopes of Sgùrr na h-Ulaidh. It flows initially generally west through a narrow valley (Caol Creran), with several waterfalls (which form part of the boundary between Argyll and Lochaber), and then generally west then south-west through a broader and flatter valley (Glen Creran). Its major tributary, the River Ure, joins it on the left, then it flows through a small loch, Loch Baile Mhic Chalein (which contains a crannog), and it then reaches a sea loch, Loch Creran. The river's course passes no significant settlements.

Under the Conservation of Salmon (Scotland) Amendment Regulations 2023, the river has been awarded Grade 3 for the year 2024.
