= Silver Flowe =

Protected area of peatland in southern Scotland

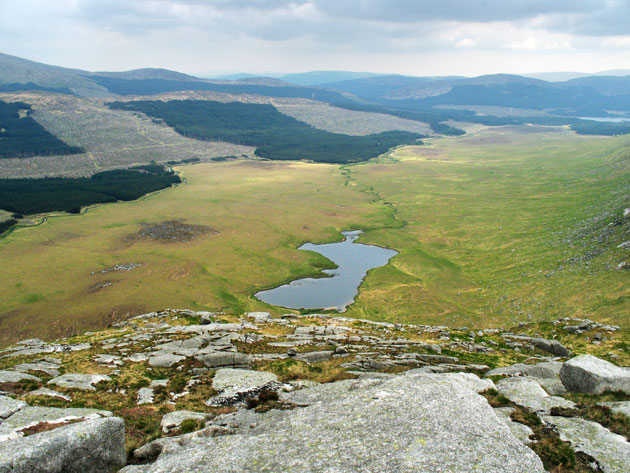
- Silver Flowe from Dungeon Hill
- Interactive map of Silver Flowe
- Location: Dumfries and Galloway, Scotland
- Nearest city: Dumfries
- Coordinates: 55.11750°N 4.40222°W
- Area: 6.2 km^{2} (2.4 sq mi)
- Established: 24 July 1981

Silver Flowe is an area of patterned blanket mire in the Galloway Hills, in Dumfries and Galloway, Scotland. Located around 16 km north northeast of Newton Stewart, it forms part of the Galloway Forest Park. An area of 620 hectares has been designated as a Ramsar Site.

The site is one of the least-disturbed and most varied areas of acid peatland in southern Scotland. The site includes the most southerly of the characteristic oceanic blanket bogs in the west of Scotland. It is a breeding site for the rare Azure Hawker dragonfly.

As well as being recognised as a wetland of international importance under the Ramsar Convention, Silver Flowe has also been designated a Site of Special Scientific Interest as well as forming part of the UNESCO recognised Silver Flowe-Merrick Kells biosphere reserve.
