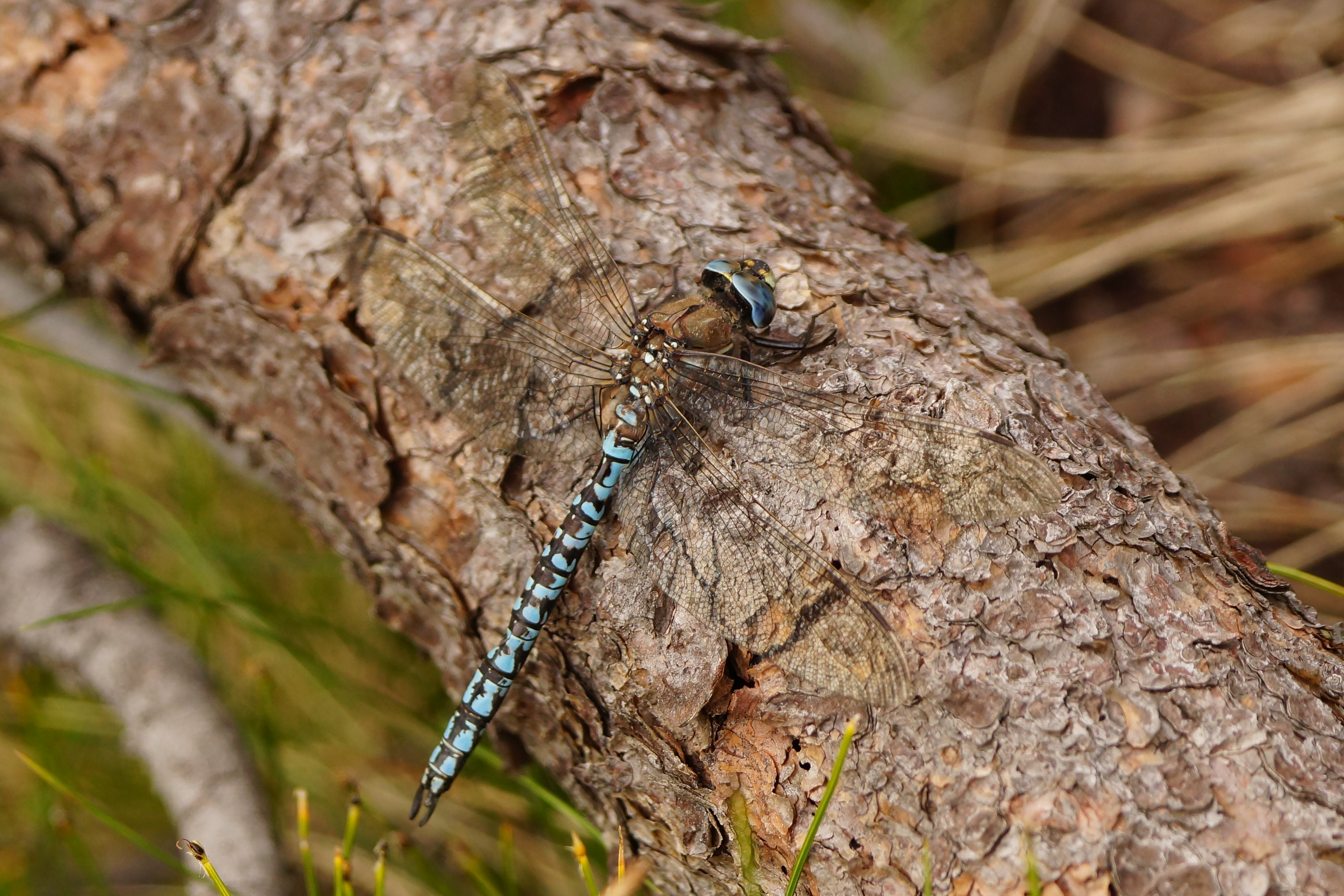

Conservation status
- Least Concern (IUCN 3.1)

Scientific classification
- Kingdom: Animalia
- Phylum: Arthropoda
- Clade: Pancrustacea
- Class: Insecta
- Order: Odonata
- Infraorder: Anisoptera
- Family: Aeshnidae
- Genus: Aeshna
- Species: A. caerulea

Binomial name
- Aeshna caerulea (Strøm, 1783)
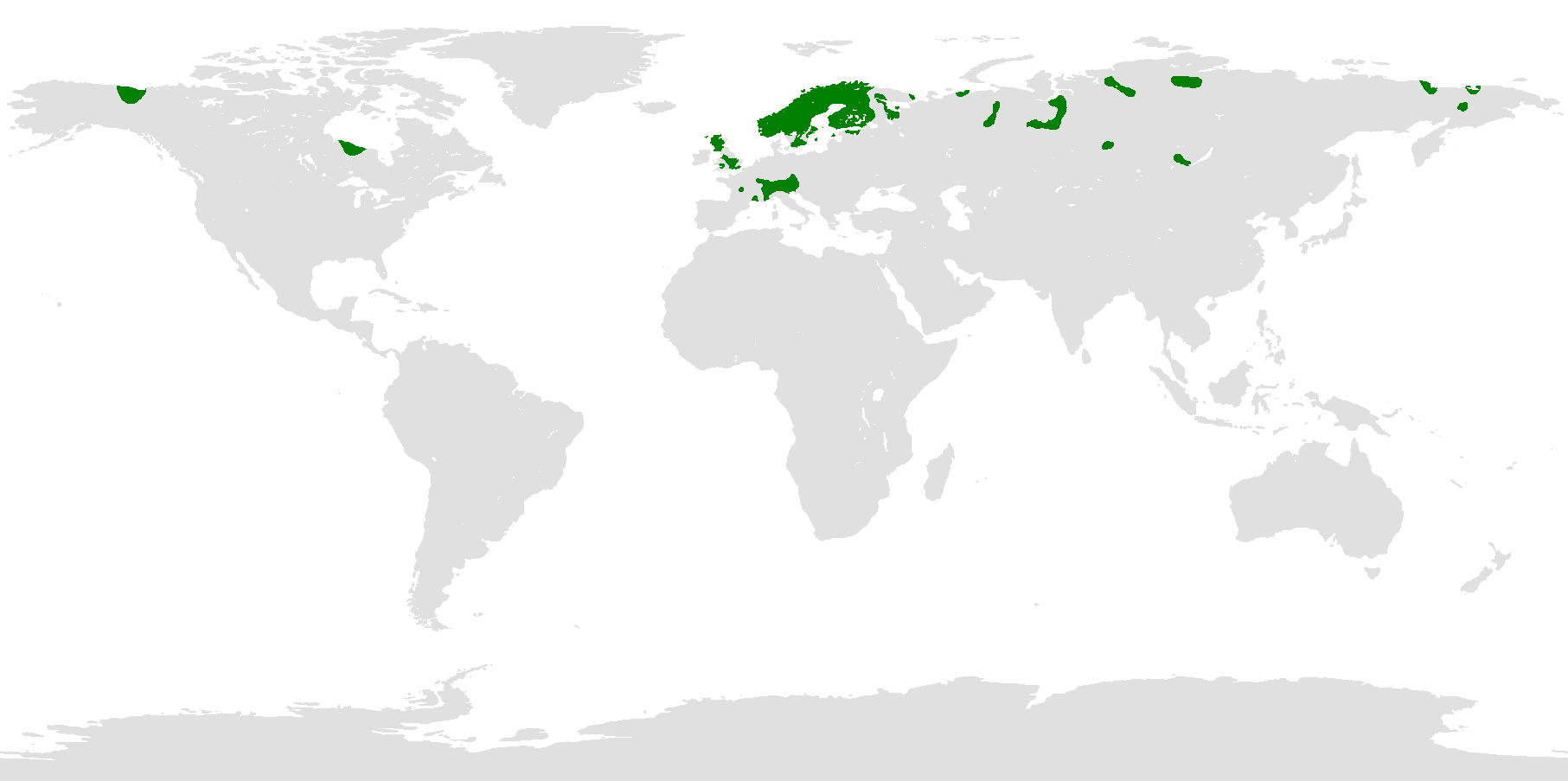
- Range of Aeshna caerulea

= Azure hawker =

Species of dragonfly

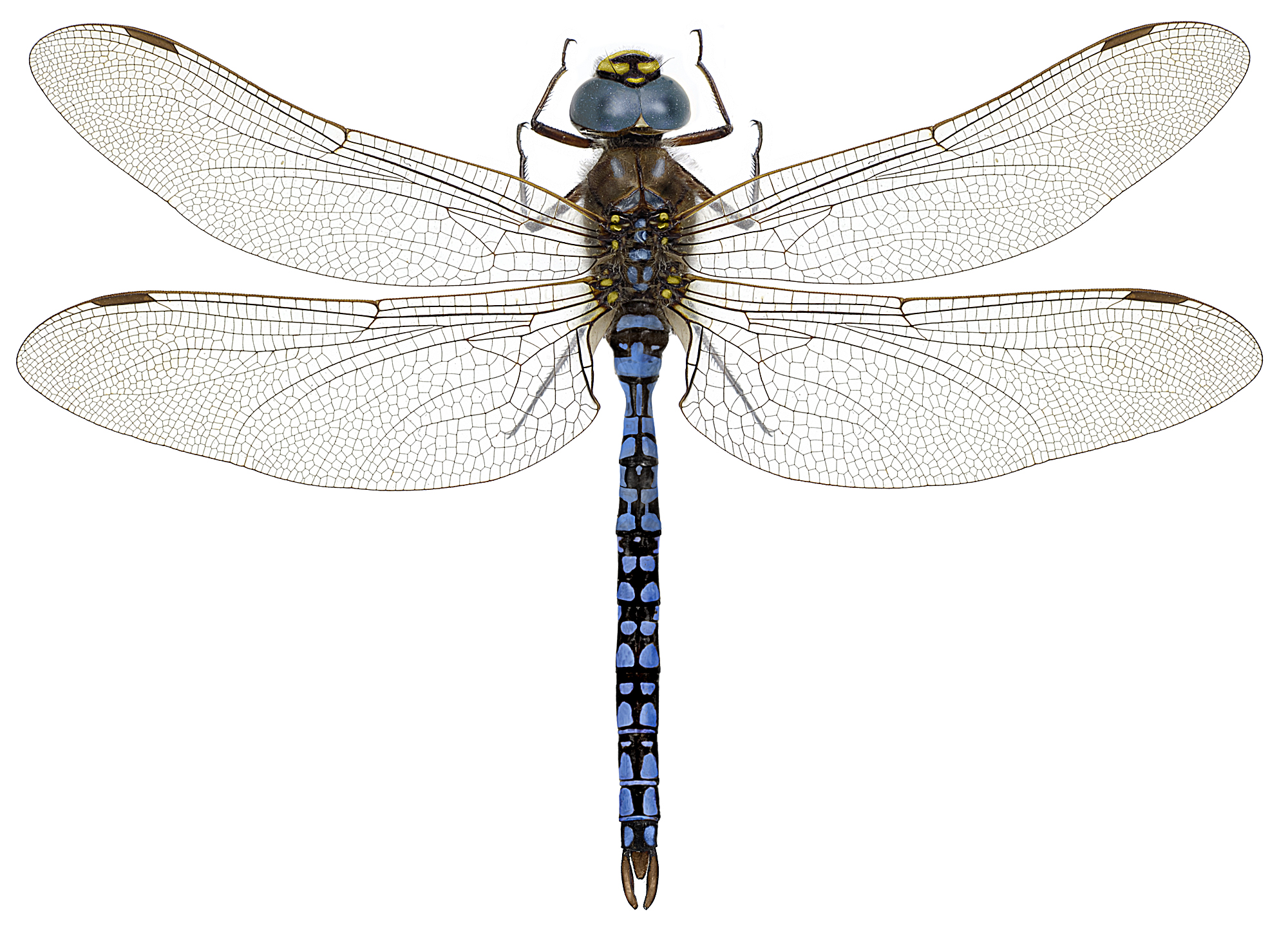

The azure hawker (Aeshna caerulea) is one of the smaller species of hawker dragonflies, (family Aeshnidae). Its flight period is from late May to August.

It is about 62 mm long. Both sexes have azure blue spots on each abdominal segment and the thorax also has azure markings. The markings on the male are brighter and more conspicuous than in the female. The female also has a brown colour form.

This species flies in sunshine, but will also frequently bask on stones or tree trunks. By lowering their wings during basking, they are able to increase the temperature of their bodies by as much as 7C compared to air temperature and continue searching for mates. It shelters in heather or similar low vegetation in dull weather. Possibly similar to Austrolestes annulosus and Diphlebia nymphoides, the abdominal and eye spots of males reversibly change from purple-gray pales as temperatures decrease to more bluish as they increase.

The species is widespread in the Eurasian polar region and the Alps in Central Europe, leading to the conclusion that the species is a glacial relict. However, larvae are restricted to micro-climates with very consistent, warm water with peaty bottoms. Adults frequently feed upon Boloria aquilonaris, Inachis io, Erebia, and Phytometra gamma which are more common in the bogs of the Alps than surrounding habitats.
