= List of Special Protection Areas in Scotland =

This is a list of Special Protection Areas (SPAs) in Scotland.

Site name	Site code	Country	Area (ha)	Coordinates	Status
Abernethy Forest	UK9002561	S	5793.46	57°13′22″N 03°18′10″W	Classified
Achanalt Marshes	UK9001701	S	208.25	57°36′10″N 04°53′30″W	Classified
Ailsa Craig	UK9003091	S	99.94	55°15′15″N 05°07′00″W	Classified
Aird and Borve, Benbecula	UK9001751	S	361	57°27′20″N 07°23′30″W	Classified
Anagach Wood	UK9020297	S			Potential
Arran Moors	UK9003341	S	10736.51	55°32′40″N 05°13′30″W	Classified
Assynt Lochs	UK9001591	S	1156.43	58°10′00″N 05°00′00″W	Classified
Auskerry	UK9002381	S	101.97	59°02′00″N 02°34′00″W	Classified
Ballochbuie	UK9002781	S	1881.73	56°59′30″N 03°19′06″W	Classified
Beinn Dearg	UK9001631	S	5567.59	57°48′00″N 04°55′00″W	Classified
Ben Alder	UK9002551	S	2860.21	56°50′25″N 04°29′45″W	Classified
Ben Wyvis	UK9001641	S	2174.54	57°41′00″N 04°34′30″W	Classified
Black Cart	UK9003221	S	56.3	55°52′45″N 04°26′20″W	Classified
Bridgend Flats, Islay	UK9003052	S	331.16	55°46′22″N 06°16′05″W	Classified
Buchan Ness to Collieston Coast	UK9002491	S	208.62	57°26′20″N 01°48′30″W	Classified
Caenlochan	UK9004011	S	5975.28	56°52′54″N 03°17′30″W	Classified
Cairngorms	UK9002241	S	50903.74	57°04′30″N 03°38′30″W	Classified
Caithness Lochs	UK9001151	S	145516.75	58°20′10″N 03°56′15″W	Classified
Caithness and Sutherland Peatlands	UK9001171	S	1378.45	58°29′30″N 03°20′00″W	Classified
Calf of Eday	UK9002431	S	238.03	59°14′24″N 02°43′48″W	Classified
Cameron Reservoir	UK9004131	S	68.76	56°17′32″N 02°51′12″W	Classified
Canna and Sanday	UK9001431	S	1341.27	57°04′00″N 06°30′00″W	Classified
Cape Wrath	UK9001231	S	1019.18	58°36′00″N 04°53′30″W	Classified
Castle Loch, Lochmaben	UK9003191	S	107.6	55°07′12″N 03°25′50″W	Classified
Cnuic agus Cladach Mhuile	UK9003311	S	29248.97	56°26′30″N 06°00′20″W	Classified
Coll (corncrake)	UK9003033	S	2321.88	56°39′16″N 06°30′05″W	Classified
Coll	UK9003031	S	371.13	56°36′10″N 06°37′15″W	Classified
Copinsay	UK9002151	S	125.42	58°54′00″N 02°40′30″W	Classified
Craigmore Wood	UK9001801	S	654.09	57°17′00″N 03°37′00″W	Classified
Creag Meagaidh	UK9002161	S	2872.64	56°57′00″N 04°35′00″W	Classified
Cromarty Firth	UK9001623	S	3746.95	57°41′00″N 04°12′00″W	Classified
Cuillins	UK9001781	S	29490.01	57°14′39″N 06°08′45″W	Classified
Darnaway and Lethen Forest	UK9020292	S	1828.61	57°32′45″N 03°41′45″W	Classified
Din Moss - Hoselaw Loch	UK9004291	S	50.59	55°34′33″N 02°18′30″W	Classified
Dornoch Firth and Loch Fleet	UK9001622	S	7836.33	57°51′00″N 04°02′30″W	Classified
Drumochter Hills	UK9002301	S	9445.56	56°51′54″N 04°14′48″W	Classified
East Caithness Cliffs	UK9001182	S	442.62	58°16′49″N 03°20′21″W	Classified
East Sanday Coast	UK9002331	S	1515.23	59°16′00″N 02°34′00″W	Classified
Eilean na Muice Duibhe (Duich Moss), Islay	UK9003054	S	576.42	55°43′20″N 06°15′20″W	Classified
Eoligarry, Barra	UK9001761	S	144.04	57°02′50″N 07°25′48″W	Classified
Fair Isle	UK9002091	S	561.27	59°32′15″N 01°37′00″W	Classified
Fala Flow	UK9004241	S	318.04	55°49′00″N 02°54′20″W	Classified
Fetlar	UK9002031	S	2594.91	60°36′35″N 00°51′20″W	Classified
Firth of Forth	UK9004411	S	6313.72	56°01′00″N 02°53′00″W	Classified
Firth of Tay and Eden Estuary	UK9004121	S	6923.29	56°24′30″N 03°05′00″W	Classified
Flannan Isles	UK9001021	S	58.87	58°17′20″N 07°35′30″W	Classified
Forest of Clunie	UK9004381	S	19349.38	56°40′00″N 03°35′00″W	Classified
Forth Islands	UK9004171	S	106.01	56°11′10″N 02°33′20″W	Classified
Foula	UK9002061	S	1323.31	60°08′20″N 02°05′00″W	Classified
Fowlsheugh	UK9002271	S	10.15	56°54′45″N 02°11′45″W	Classified
Gladhouse Reservoir	UK9004231	S	186.41	55°47′10″N 03°06′00″W	Classified
Glas Eileanan	UK9003211	S	1.43	56°29′48″N 05°42′50″W	Classified
Glen App and Galloway Moors	UK9003351	S	8942.38	55°00′20″N 04°56′30″W	Classified
Glen Tanar	UK9002771	S	4180.09	57°01′10″N 02°53′30″W	Classified
Greenlaw Moor	UK9004281	S	247.59	55°44′06″N 02°27′06″W	Classified
Gruinart Flats, Islay	UK9003051	S	3261.32	55°50′42″N 06°19′33″W	Classified
Handa	UK9001241	S	367.49	58°23′00″N 05°11′12″W	Classified
Hermaness, Saxa Vord and Valla Field	UK9002011	S	1662.92	60°49′19″N 00°54′00″W	Classified
Hoy	UK9002141	S	9499.7	58°51′30″N 03°19′10″W	Classified
Imperial Dock Lock, Leith	UK9004451	S	0.11	55°59′00″N 03°10′15″W	Potential
Inner Clyde Estuary	UK9003061	S	1826.02	55°56′50″N 04°38′00″W	Classified
Inner Moray Firth	UK9001624	S	2339.23	56°50′25″N 04°21′15″W	Classified
Inverpolly, Loch Urigill and nearby lochs	UK9001511	S	1986.3	58°04′30″N 05°11′00″W	Classified
Kilpheder to Smerclate, South Uist	UK9001083	S	380.63	57°02′40″N 07°23′24″W	Classified
Kintyre Goose Roosts	UK9003071	S	412.37	55°31′00″N 05°37′00″W	Classified
Kinveachy Forest	UK9002581	S	2849.36	57°14′15″N 03°54′00″W	Classified
Knapdale Lochs	UK9003301	S	112.39	55°51′30″N 05°35′00″W	Classified
Ladder Hills	UK9002951	S	4240.4	57°12′12″N 03°15′00″W	Potential
Laggan, Islay	UK9003053	S	1230.02	55°43′16″N 06°18′24″W	Classified
Lairg and Strathbrora Lochs	UK9001611	S	286.3	58°04′45″N 04°24′40″W	Classified
Langholm - Newcastleton Hills	UK9003271	S	7544.87	55°12′15″N 02°53′50″W	Classified
Lewis Peatlands	UK9001571	S	58984.23	58°15′00″N 06°35′00″W	Classified
Loch Ashie	UK9001554	S	162.29	57°22′44″N 04°17′00″W	Classified
Loch Eye	UK9001621	S	205.14	57°47′30″N 03°58′00″W	Classified
Loch Flemington	UK9001691	S	21	57°32′32″N 03°59′15″W	Classified
Loch Ken and River Dee marshes	UK9003111	S	769.11	54°59′28″N 04°01′00″W	Classified
Loch Knockie and Nearby Lochs	UK9001552	S	395.92	57°05′45″N 04°35′00″W	Classified
Loch Leven	UK9004111	S	1611.81	56°11′48″N 03°22′30″W	Classified
Loch Lomond	UK9003021	S	510.49	56°03′45″N 04°30′30″W	Classified
Loch Maree	UK9001531	S	3173.66	57°41′10″N 05°28′15″W	Classified
Loch of Inch and Torrs Warren	UK9003121	S	2111.04	54°50′30″N 04°52′30″W	Classified
Loch of Kinnordy	UK9004051	S	85.09	56°40′30″N 03°02′40″W	Classified
Loch of Lintrathen	UK9004061	S	186.4	56°40′40″N 03°11′00″W	Classified
Loch of Skene	UK9002261	S	120.89	57°09′30″N 02°21′30″W	Classified
Loch of Spiggie and Loch of Brow	UK9002211	S	615.94	57°37′24″N 01°53′00″W	Classified
Loch of Strathbeg	UK9001551	S	201.15	57°19′54″N 04°16′48″W	Classified
Loch Ruthven	UK9001721	S	2290.94	56°50′00″N 05°30′00″W	Classified
Loch Shiel	UK9002201	S	93.62	57°41′00″N 03°16′42″W	Classified
Loch Spynie	UK9002751	S	44.6	57°14′20″N 03°48′00″W	Classified
Loch Vaa	UK9002281	S	1431.28	56°56′30″N 03°16′00″W	Classified
Lochnagar	UK9002651	S	141.48	59°56′00″N 01°20′00″W	Classified
Marwick Head	UK9002121	S	8.7	59°06′20″N 03°21′00″W	Classified
Mingulay and Berneray	UK9001121	S	911.07	56°48′18″N 07°38′33″W	Classified
Mointeach Scadabhaigh	UK9001501	S	4148.44	57°36′00″N 07°17′00″W	Classified
Monach Isles	UK9001071	S	595.74	57°31′30″N 07°36′30″W	Classified
Montrose Basin	UK9004031	S	984.61	56°42′40″N 02°30′20″W	Classified
Morangie Forest	UK9001791	S	3512.92	57°47′30″N 04°07′15″W	Classified
Moray and Nairn Coast	UK9001625	S	2410.25	57°38′54″N 03°43′48″W	Classified
Mousa	UK9002361	S	197.98	60°00′00″N 01°10′20″W	Classified
Muir of Dinnet	UK9002791	S	157.6	57°05′00″N 02°55′00″W	Classified
Muirkirk and North Lowther Uplands	UK9003261	S	26330.31	55°30′35″N 04°04′35″W	Classified
Ness and Barvas, Lewis	UK9001741	S	649.2	58°29′30″N 06°15′30″W	Classified
North Caithness Cliffs	UK9001181	S	557.73	58°39′00″N 03°24′30″W	Classified
North Colonsay and Western Cliffs	UK9003171	S	973.96	56°06′28″N 06°10′00″W	Classified
North Harris Mountains	UK9001572	S	13132.01	58°00′00″N 06°57′30″W	Classified
North Inverness Lochs	UK9001553	S	123.21	57°21′42″N 04°30′10″W	Classified
North Rona and Sula Sgeir	UK9001011	S	138.81	59°07′18″N 05°49′30″W	Classified
North Sutherland Coastal Islands	UK9001211	S	221.11	58°33′30″N 04°21′00″W	Classified
North Uist Machair and Islands	UK9001051	S	4876.35	57°32′00″N 07°22′45″W	Classified
Noss	UK9002081	S	343.82	60°08′40″N 01°01′00″W	Classified
Novar	UK9020293	S	1054.65	57°41′30″N 04°20′10″W	Classified
Orkney Mainland Moors	UK9002311	S	4444.35	59°05′00″N 03°08′00″W	Classified
Otterswick and Graveland	UK9002941	S	2241.41	60°33′35″N 01°06′30″W	Classified
Papa Stour	UK9002051	S	569.03	60°20′10″N 01°42′00″W	Classified
Papa Westray (North Hill and Holm of Papa)	UK9002111	S	245.71	59°22′40″N 02°52′45″W	Classified
Pentland Firth Islands	UK9001131	S	170.51	58°44′30″N 03°03′30″W	Classified
Priest Island (Summer Isles)	UK9001261	S	131.68	57°57′40″N 05°30′30″W	Classified
Ramna Stacks and Gruney	UK9002021	S	11.59	60°39′10″N 01°18′10″W	Classified
Rannoch Lochs	UK9004021	S	1170.19	56°40′00″N 04°37′00″W	Classified
Renfrewshire Heights	UK9020295	S			Potential
Rinns of Islay	UK9003057	S	9407.46	55°46′55″N 06°21′00″W	Classified
River Spey - Insh Marshes	UK9002231	S	1158.87	57°05′23″N 03°59′48″W	Classified
Ronas Hill - North Roe and Tingon	UK9002041	S	5470.2	60°33′00″N 01°25′00″W	Classified
Rousay	UK9002371	S	633.41	59°10′50″N 03°06′00″W	Classified
Rùm	UK9001341	S	10942.38	57°00′00″N 06°20′00″W	Classified
Shiant Isles	UK9001041	S	212.33	57°54′00″N 06°22′00″W	Classified
Sléibhtean agus Cladach Thiriodh (Tiree Wetlands and Coast)	UK9003032	S	1938.59	56°30′00″N 06°52′00″W	Classified
Solway Firth (Note: Formerly called 'Upper Solway Flats and Marshes')	UK9005012	ES	43636.73	54°54′20″N 03°25′27″W	Classified
South Tayside Goose Roosts	UK9004401	S	331.01	56°15′54″N 03°50′00″W	Classified
South Uist Machair and Lochs	UK9001082	S	5017.23	57°18′50″N 07°20′00″W	Classified
St Abb's Head to Fast Castle	UK9004271	S	250.88	55°55′00″N 02°10′00″W	Classified
St Kilda	UK9001031	S	865.51	57°49′00″N 08°35′00″W	Classified
Sule Skerry and Sule Stack	UK9002181	S	18.9	59°05′05″N 04°24′15″W	Classified
Sumburgh Head	UK9002511	S	39.04	59°51′55″N 01°16′05″W	Classified
Switha	UK9002891	S	57.39	58°47′08″N 03°06′00″W	Classified
Tips of Corsemaul and Tom Mór	UK9002811	S	83.71	57°26′32″N 03°00′35″W	Classified
Tiree (corncrake)	UK9003034	S	544.08	56°28′20″N 06°55′00″W	Classified
Treshnish Isles	UK9003041	S	240.67	56°29′30″N 06°25′10″W	Classified
Troup, Pennan and Lion`s Heads	UK9002471	S	172.11	57°41′00″N 02°15′05″W	Classified
West Westray	UK9002101	S	350.62	59°17′40″N 03°00′45″W	Classified
Wester Ross Lochs	UK9001711	S	1980.26	57°45′00″N 05°27′00″W	Classified
Westwater	UK9004251	S	49.77	55°45′30″N 03°24′30″W	Classified
Ythan Estuary, Sands of Forvie and Meikle Loch	UK9002221	S	1016.24	57°20′30″N 01°57′30″W	Classified
