= List of Special Protection Areas in the United Kingdom =

This is a list of Special Protection Area in the United Kingdom.

== England ==
Site Name	Local Authority	Site Code	Map Reference
Abberton Reservoir	Essex	UK9009141	TL979182
Alde-Ore Estuary	Suffolk	UK9009112	TM433487
Alt Estuary (part of Ribble and Alt Estuaries Phase 2)	Merseyside	UK9005102	SD348237
Arun Valley	West Sussex	UK9020281	TQ035143
Ashdown Forest	East Sussex	UK9012181	TQ450313
Avon Valley	Dorset; Hampshire	UK9011091	SZ144983
Benacre to Easton Bavents	Suffolk	UK9009291	TM524830
Benfleet and Southend Marshes	Essex; Southend-on-Sea	UK9009171	TQ861845
Blackwater Estuary (Mid-Essex Coast Phase 4)	Essex	UK9009245	TL978100
Bowland Fells	Lancashire	UK9005151	SD631547
Breydon Water	Norfolk	UK9009181	TG453047
Broadland	Norfolk; Suffolk	UK9009253	TG430211
Chesil Beach and The Fleet	Dorset	UK9010091	SY633792
Chew Valley Lake	Bath and North East Somerset	UK9010041	ST569597
Chichester and Langstone Harbours	City of Portsmouth; Hampshire; West Sussex	UK9011011	SU761014
Colne Estuary (Mid-Essex Coast Phase 2)	Essex	UK9009243	TM040172
Coquet Island	Northumberland	UK9006031	NU294047
Crouch and Roach Estuaries (Mid-Essex Coast Phase 3)	Essex	UK9009244	TQ881970
Deben Estuary SSSI	Suffolk	UK9009261	TM294435
Dengie (Mid-Essex Coast Phase 1)	Essex	UK9009242	TM045033
Dorset Heathlands	Bournemouth; Dorset; Hampshire; Poole	UK9010101	SY887834
Duddon Estuary	Cumbria	UK9005031	SD180765
Dungeness to Pett Level	East Sussex; Kent	UK9012091	TQ932182
East Devon Heaths	Devon	UK9010121	SY040867
Exe Estuary	Devon	UK9010081	SX980841
Farne Islands	Northumberland	UK9006021	NU221364
Flamborough Head and Bempton Cliffs	East Riding of Yorkshire; North Yorkshire	UK9006101	TA233723
Foulness (Mid-Essex Coast Phase 5)	Essex	UK9009246	TR024902
Gibraltar Point	Lincolnshire	UK9008022	TF565585
Great Yarmouth North Denes	Norfolk	UK9009271	TG488216
Hamford Water	Essex	UK9009131	TM231251
Holburn Lake and Moss	Northumberland	UK9006041	NU051365
Hornsea Mere	East Riding of Yorkshire	UK9006171	TA188469
Humber Flats, Marshes and Coast Phase 1	East Riding of Yorkshire; North Lincolnshire; North East Lincolnshire	UK9006111	TA315170
Isles of Scilly	Isles of Scilly	UK9020288	SV884161
Lee Valley	Essex; Greater London; Hertfordshire	UK9012111	TQ351887
Leighton Moss	Lancashire	UK9005091	SD483749
Lindisfarne	Northumberland	UK9006011	NU102422
Lower Derwent Valley	East Riding of Yorkshire; North Yorkshire	UK9006092	SE706437
Marazion Marsh	Cornwall	UK9020289	SW517319
Martin Mere	Lancashire	UK9005111	SD420145
Medway Estuary and Marshes	Kent; Medway	UK9012031	TQ862703
Mersey Estuary	Cheshire; Halton; Liverpool; Wirral	UK9005131	SJ451800
Minsmere-Walberswick	Suffolk	UK9009101	TM476748
Moor House (Durham) (part of North Pennine Moors)	County Durham	UK9006271	NY727322
Morecambe Bay	Cumbria; Lancashire	UK9005081	SD375700
Nene Washes	Cambridgeshire; City of Peterborough	UK9008031	TL304996
New Forest	Hampshire; Wiltshire	UK9011031	SU242030
North Norfolk Coast	Norfolk	UK9009031	TF745446
North Pennine Moors	Cumbria; Durham; North Yorkshire; Northumberland	UK9006272	NY841291
North York Moors	North Yorkshire; Redcar and Cleveland	UK9006161	NZ725006
Northumbria Coast	Durham; North Tyneside; Northumberland; South Tyneside; City of Sunderland	UK9006131	NU260193
Old Hall Marshes (part of Blackwater Estuary)	Essex	UK9009241	TR024902
Orford Ness – Havergate (part of Alde–Ore Estuary)	Suffolk	UK9009111	TM433487
Ouse Washes	Cambridgeshire; Norfolk	UK9008041	TL498888
Pagham Harbour	West Sussex	UK9012041	SZ874968
Peak District Moors (South Pennine Moors Phase 1)		UK9007021	SK157968
Poole Harbour	Dorset; Poole	UK9010111	SY982869
Porton Down	Hampshire; Wiltshire	UK9011101	SU242368
Portsmouth Harbour	City of Portsmouth; Hampshire	UK9011051	SU616036
Ribble and Alt Estuaries	-	UK9005103	sd348237
Ribble Estuary (part of Ribble and Alt Estuaries Phase 2)	Lancashire; Merseyside	UK9005101	SD377238
Rockcliffe Marsh (part of Upper Solway Flats and Marshes)	Cumbria	UK9005011	NY325640
Rutland Water	Rutland	UK9008051	SK903064
Salisbury Plain	Hampshire; Wiltshire	UK9011102	SU079506
Sandlings	Suffolk	UK9020286	TM359479
Solent and Southampton Water	Hampshire; Isle of Wight; Southampton	UK9011061	SZ335936
Somerset Levels and Moors	Somerset	UK9010031	ST394417
South Pennine Moors Phase 2	-	UK9007022	SD953349
South West London Waterbodies	Greater London; Surrey; Windsor and Maidenhead	UK9012171	TQ025747
Stodmarsh	Kent	UK9012121	TR211610
Stour and Orwell Estuaries	Essex; Suffolk	UK9009121	TM169332
Tamar Estuaries Complex	City of Plymouth; Cornwall; Devon	UK9010141	SX441621
Teesmouth and Cleveland Coast	Hartlepool; Redcar and Cleveland; Stockton-on-Tees	UK9006061	NZ569265
Thames Basin Heaths	Surrey Berkshire Hampshire	UK9012141	SU885588
Thames Estuary and Marshes	Kent; Medway; Thurrock	UK9012021	TQ802795
Thanet Coast and Sandwich Bay	Kent	UK9012071	TR355617
The Swale	Kent	UK9012011	TQ976663
The Wash	Lincolnshire; Norfolk	UK9008021	TF537403
Thorne and Hatfield Moors	Doncaster; East Riding of Yorkshire; North Lincolnshire	UK9005171	SE728163
Thursley, Hankley and Frensham Commons (Wealden Heaths Phase 1)	Surrey	UK9012131	SU910412
Upper Severn Estuary (part of Severn Estuary)	Gloucestershire	UK9015021	SO715063
Walmore Common	Gloucestershire	UK9007051	SO745150
Wealden Heaths (Phase 2)	Hampshire	UK9012132	SU805326

== Scotland ==
Site Name	Local Authority	Site Code	Map Reference
Abernethy Forest	Highland	UK9002561	NJ213154
Achanalt Marshes	Highland	UK9001701	NH272606
Ailsa Craig	South Ayrshire	UK9003091	NX019100
Aird & Borve, Benbecula	Western Isles / Na h-Eileanan an Iar	UK9001751	NF767534
Arran Moors	North Ayrshire	UK9003341	NR975332
Assynt Lochs	Highland	UK9001591	NC235236
Auskerry	Orkney Islands	UK9002381	HY675163
Ballochbuie	Aberdeenshire	UK9002781	NO199897
Beinn Dearg	Highland	UK9001631	NH267826
Ben Alder	Highland	UK9002551	NN478749
Ben Wyvis	Highland	UK9001641	NH465688
Black Cart	Renfrewshire	UK9003221	NS474678
Bridgend Flats, Islay	Argyll and Bute	UK9003052	NR324615
Buchan Ness to Collieston Coast	Aberdeenshire	UK9002491	NK115387
Caenlochan	Aberdeenshire; Angus; Perth and Kinross	UK9004011	NO213774
Cairngorms	Aberdeenshire; Highland	UK9002241	NO005994
Caithness and Sutherland Peatlands	Highland	UK9001151	NC866402
Caithness Lochs	Highland	UK9001171	ND223567
Calf of Eday	Orkney Islands	UK9002431	HY584394
Cameron Reservoir	Fife	UK9004131	NO472114
Canna and Sanday	Highland	UK9001431	NG273063
Cape Wrath	Highland	UK9001231	NC320716
Castle Loch, Lochmaben	Dumfries and Galloway	UK9003191	NY088816
Cnuic agus Cladach Mhuile	Argyll and Bute	UK9003311	NM563275
Coll	Argyll and Bute	UK9003031	NM242605
Coll (corncrake)	Argyll and Bute	UK9003033	NM165552
Copinsay	Orkney Islands	UK9002151	HY611016
Craigmore Wood	Highland	UK9001801	NJ026224
Creag Meagaidh	Highland	UK9002161	NN429873
Cromarty Firth	Highland	UK9001623	NH688680
Cuillins	Highland	UK9001781	NG306265
Din Moss – Hoselaw Loch	Scottish Borders	UK9004291	NT806314
Dornoch Firth and Loch Fleet	Highland	UK9001622	NH788863
Drumochter Hills	Highland; Perth and Kinross	UK9002301	NN631771
East Caithness Cliffs	Highland	UK9001182	ND215331
East Sanday Coast	Orkney Islands	UK9002331	HY677423
Eilean na Muice Duibhe (Duich Moss), Islay	Argyll and Bute	UK9003054	NR328558
Eoligarry, Barra	Western Isles / Na h-Eileanan an Iar	UK9001761	NF708082
Fair Isle	Shetland Islands	UK9002091	HZ217724
Fala Flow	Midlothian	UK9004241	NT433585
Fetlar	Shetland Islands	UK9002031	HU626923
Feur Lochain (part of Rinns of Islay)	Argyll and Bute	UK9003056	NR252693
Firth of Forth	City of Edinburgh; Clackmannanshire; East Lothian; Falkirk; Fife; Stirling; West Lothian	UK9004411	NS970823
Firth of Tay & Eden Estuary	Dundee City; Fife; Perth and Kinross	UK9004121	NO332245
Flannan Isles	Western Isles / Na h-Eileanan an Iar	UK9001021	NA724469
Forest of Clunie	Perth and Kinross	UK9004381	NO030539
Forth Islands	East Lothian; City of Edinburgh; Fife	UK9004171	NT655994
Foula	Shetland Islands	UK9002061	HT954393
Fowlsheugh	Aberdeenshire	UK9002271	NO881801
Glac na Criche (part of Rinns of Islay)	Argyll and Bute	UK9003055	NR224709
Gladhouse Reservoir	Midlothian	UK9004231	NT310553
Glas Eileanan	Argyll and Bute	UK9003211	NM714400
Glen App and Galloway Moors	Dumfries and Galloway; South Ayrshire	UK9003351	NX119718
Glen Tanar	Aberdeenshire	UK9002771	NO459924
Greenlaw Moor	Scottish Borders	UK9004281	NT716492
Gruinart Flats, Islay	Argyll and Bute	UK9003051	NR292698
Handa	Highland	UK9001241	NC137483
Hermaness, Saxa Vord and Valla Field	Shetland Islands	UK9002011	HP598152
Hoy	Orkney Islands	UK9002141	HY239975
Inner Clyde Estuary	Argyll and Bute; Inverclyde; Renfrewshire; West Dunbartonshire	UK9003061	NS356758
Inner Moray Firth	Highland	UK9001624	NN564745
Inverpolly, Loch Urigill and Nearby Lochs	Highland	UK9001511	NC123139
Kilpheder to Smerclate, South Uist	Western Isles / Na h-Eileanan an Iar	UK9001083	NF732077
Kintyre Goose Roosts	Argyll and Bute	UK9003071	NR717307
Kinveachy Forest	Highland	UK9002581	NH853179
Knapdale Lochs	Argyll and Bute	UK9003301	NR755684
Laggan, Islay	Argyll and Bute	UK9003053	NR296559
Lairg and Strathbrora Lochs	Highland	UK9001611	NC578125
Langholm – Newcastleton Hills	Dumfries and Galloway; Scottish Borders	UK9003271	NY430904
Lewis Peatlands	Western Isles / Na h-Eileanan an Iar	UK9001571	NB311382
Loch Ashie	Highland	UK9001554	NH627343
Loch Druidibeg, Loch a' Machair and Loch Stilligarry (part of South Uist Machair and Lochs)	Western Isles / Na h-Eileanan an Iar	UK9001081	NF780378
Loch Eye	Highland	UK9001621	NH831797
Loch Flemington	Highland	UK9001691	NH810519
Loch Ken and River Dee Marshes	Dumfries and Galloway	UK9003111	NX710681
Loch Knockie and Nearby Lochs	Highland	UK9001552	NH435035
Loch Leven	Perth and Kinross	UK9004111	NO147013
Loch Lomond	Argyll and Bute; Stirling; West Dunbartonshire	UK9003021	NS438883
Loch Maree	Highland	UK9001531	NG931715
Loch of Inch and Torrs Warren	Dumfries and Galloway	UK9003121	NX154534
Loch of Kinnordy	Angus	UK9004051	NO360542
Loch of Lintrathen	Angus	UK9004061	NO275546
Loch of Skene	Aberdeenshire	UK9002261	NJ783075
Loch of Strathbeg	Aberdeenshire	UK9002211	NK070592
Loch Ruthven	Highland	UK9001551	NH617278
Loch Shiel	Highland	UK9001721	NM865768
Loch Spynie	Moray	UK9002201	NJ238666
Loch Vaa	Highland	UK9002751	NH914179
Lochnagar	Aberdeenshire; Angus	UK9002281	NO229841
Lochs of Spiggie and Brow	Shetland Islands	UK9002651	HU373166
Marwick Head	Orkney Islands	UK9002121	HY227250
Mingulay and Berneray	Western Isles / Na h-Eileanan an Iar	UK9001121	NL557824
Mointeach Scadabhaigh	Western Isles / Na h-Eileanan an Iar	UK9001501	NF845689
Monach Islands	Western Isles / Na h-Eileanan an Iar	UK9001071	NF644622
Montrose Basin	Angus	UK9004031	NO691578
Morangie Forest	Highland	UK9001791	NH735802
Moray and Nairn Coast	Highland; Moray	UK9001625	NH968633
Mousa	Shetland Islands	UK9002361	HU462241
Muir of Dinnet	Aberdeenshire	UK9002791	NO444995
Muirkirk and North Lowther Uplands	Dumfries and Galloway; East Ayrshire; South Lanarkshire	UK9003261	NS689260
Ness & Barvas, Lewis	Western Isles / Na h-Eileanan an Iar	UK9001741	NB519638
North Caithness Cliffs	Highland	UK9001181	ND183744
North Colonsay and Western Cliffs	Argyll and Bute	UK9003171	NR410984
North Harris Mountains	Western Isles / Na h-Eileanan an Iar	UK9001572	NB071119
North Inverness Lochs	Highland	UK9001553	NH495329
North Rona and Sula Sgeir	Western Isles / Na h-Eileanan an Iar	UK9001011	HW812325
North Sutherland Coastal Islands	Highland	UK9001211	NC633657
North Uist Machair and Islands	Western Isles / Na h-Eileanan an Iar	UK9001051	NF781620
Noss	Shetland Islands	UK9002081	HU546403
Orkney Mainland Moors	Orkney Islands	UK9002311	HY351223
Otterswick and Graveland	Shetland Islands	UK9002941	HU488857
Papa Stour	Shetland Islands	UK9002051	HU166613
Papa Westray (North Hill and Holm)	Orkney Islands	UK9002111	HY501549
Pentland Firth Islands	Orkney Islands	UK9001131	ND387842
Priest Island (Summer Isles)	Highland	UK9001261	NB925022
Ramna Stacks and Gruney	Shetland Islands	UK9002021	HU381967
Rannoch Lochs	Argyll and Bute; Highland; Perth and Kinross	UK9004021	NN397558
Rinns of Islay	Argyll and Bute	UK9003057	NR273629
River Spey – Insh Marshes	Highland	UK9002231	NH790016
Ronas Hill – North Roe and Tingon	Shetland Islands	UK9002041	HU320852
Rousay	Orkney Islands	UK9002371	HY371331
Rùm	Highland	UK9001341	NM369982
Shiant Isles	Western Isles / Na h-Eileanan an Iar	UK9001041	NG413984
Sléibhtean agus Cladach Thiriodh (Tiree Wetlands and Coast)	Argyll and Bute	UK9003032	NM014454
South Tayside Goose Roosts	Perth and Kinross	UK9004401	NN865096
South Uist Machair and Lochs	Western Isles / Na h-Eileanan an Iar	UK9001082	NF790374
St Abb's Head to Fast Castle	Scottish Borders	UK9004271	NT893697
St Kilda	Western Isles / Na h-Eileanan an Iar	UK9001031	NF093998
Sule Skerry and Sule Stack	Orkney Islands	UK9002181	HX622244
Sumburgh Head	Shetland Islands	UK9002511	HU410091
Switha	Orkney Islands	UK9002891	ND364891
Tips of Corsemaul and Tom Mór	Aberdeenshire; Moray	UK9002811	NJ394395
Tiree (corncrake)	Argyll and Bute	UK9003034	NL973419
Treshnish Isles	Argyll and Bute	UK9003041	NM280420
Troup, Pennan and Lion's Heads	Aberdeenshire	UK9002471	NJ850658
West Westray	Orkney Islands	UK9002101	HY423457
Wester Ross Lochs	Highland	UK9001711	NG947786
Westwater	Scottish Borders	UK9004251	NT116526
Ythan Estuary, Sands of Forvie and Meikle Loch	Aberdeenshire	UK9002221	NK025279

== Wales ==
Site Name	Local Authority	Site Code	Map Reference
Aberdaron Coast and Bardsey Island /Glannau Aberdaron and Ynys Enlli	Gwynedd	UK9013121	SH152271
Berwyn	Denbighshire; Gwynedd; Powys; Wrexham	UK9013111	SH919280
Bird's Rock /Craig yr Aderyn	Gwynedd	UK9020283	SH644068
Burry Inlet	Swansea; Carmarthenshire	UK9015011	SS494967
Castlemartin Coast	Pembrokeshire	UK9014061	SR885100
Carmarthen Bay /Bae Caerfyrddin	Carmarthenshire	UK9014091	SS280971
Dyfi Estuary / Aber Dyfi	Ceredigion; Gwynedd; Powys	UK9020284	SN647954
Elenydd – Mallaen	Carmarthenshire; Ceredigion; Powys	UK9014111	SN821648
Flat Holm	South Glamorgan		
Grassholm	Pembrokeshire	UK9014041	SM598093
Holy Island Coast /Glannau Ynys Gybi	Isle of Anglesey	UK9013101	SH208817
Lavan Sands/Traeth Lafan, Conwy Bay	Conwy; Gwynedd	UK9013031	SC654286
Migneint–Arenig–Dduallt	Conwy; Gwynedd	UK9013131	SH786437
Mynydd Cilan, Trwyn y Wylfa ac Ynysoedd Sant Tudwal	Gwynedd	UK9020282	SH320245
Ramsey Island and St David's Peninsula Coast	Pembrokeshire	UK9014062	SM728285
Skokholm and Skomer	Pembrokeshire	UK9014051	SM728093
Ynys Feurig, Cemlyn Bay and The Skerries	Isle of Anglesey	UK9013061	SH331935
Ynys Seiriol / Puffin Island	Isle of Anglesey	UK9020285	SH651821

== Northern Ireland ==
Site Name	Local Authority	Site Code	Map Reference
Belfast Lough	Northern Ireland	UK9020101	J356782
Carlingford Lough	Northern Ireland	UK9020161	J233129
Larne Lough	Northern Ireland	UK9020042	J450987
Lough Foyle	Northern Ireland	UK9020031	C621274
Lough Neagh and Lough Beg	Northern Ireland	UK9020091	J029702
Pettigoe Plateau	Northern Ireland	UK9020051	H010650
Rathlin Island	Northern Ireland	UK9020011	D127509
Sheep Island	Northern Ireland	UK9020021	D049459
Strangford Lough	Northern Ireland	UK9020111	J560578
Swan Island (part of Larne Lough)	Northern Ireland	UK9020041	J427999
Upper Lough Erne	Northern Ireland	UK9020071	H330280
