= List of Ramsar sites in Scotland =

This list includes all Ramsar sites in Scotland. Ramsar sites are internationally recognised wetland sites, protected under the terms of the Ramsar Convention, which was developed and adopted by participating nations at a meeting in Ramsar, Iran, on 2 February 1971. At the end of 2010, 160 states were contracting parties to the convention, and the worldwide total of sites was 1,920. The United Kingdom was one of 18 original signatories to the convention, and has since designated 168 Ramsar sites. 51 of these sites are within Scotland, including one site, the Upper Solway Flats and Marshes, which covers parts of both Scotland and England in the Solway Firth. The total area of all Ramsar sites in Scotland is approximately 313,500 hectares (775,000 acres). All of Scotland's Ramsar sites form part of the European Natura 2000 network as either Special Protection Areas or Special Areas of Conservation, and many sites are further protected as Sites of Special Scientific Interest under UK legislation.

== List of Ramsar sites in Scotland ==
Name	Council area	Designated	Area (hectares)	Coordinates	Site code	Image
Bridgend Flats, Islay	Argyll and Bute	1988-07-14	331	55°46′0″N 6°16′0″W	UK13001	
Cairngorm Lochs	Aberdeenshire / Highland / Moray	1981-07-24	173	57°4′0″N 3°47′0″W	UK13002	
Caithness and Sutherland Peatlands	Highland	1999-02-02	143,503	58°20′0″N 3°56′0″W	UK13003	
Caithness Lochs	Highland	1998-02-02	1,379	58°29′0″N 3°20′0″W	UK13004	
Cameron Reservoir	Fife	1994-03-14	69	56°18′0″N 2°51′0″W	UK13005	
Castle Loch, Lochmaben	Dumfries and Galloway	1996-03-15	108	55°7′0″N 3°26′0″W	UK13006	
Claish Moss	Highland	1981-07-24	568	56°44′0″N 5°44′0″W	UK13007	
Coll	Argyll and Bute	1995-03-31	2,209	56°39′0″N 6°30′0″W	UK13008	
Cromarty Firth	Highland	1999-07-22	3,747	57°41′0″N 4°12′0″W	UK13009	
Din Moss - Hoselaw Loch	Scottish Borders	1988-07-14	51	55°35′0″N 2°18′0″W	UK13010	
Dornoch Firth and Loch Fleet	Highland	1997-03-24	7,837	57°51′0″N 4°2′0″W	UK13011	
East Sanday Coast	Orkney	1997-08-11	1,515	59°16′0″N 2°34′0″W	UK13013	
Eilean na Muice Duibhe (Duich Moss), Islay	Argyll and Bute	1988-07-14	576	55°43′0″N 6°15′0″W	UK13014	
Fala Flow	Midlothian	1990-04-25	318	55°49′0″N 2°54′0″W	UK13015	
Firth of Forth	Clackmannanshire / East Lothian / Edinburgh / Falkirk / Fife / Stirling / West Lothian	2001-10-30	6,314	56°1′0″N 2°53′0″W	UK13017	
Firth of Tay & Eden Estuary	Angus / Dundee / Fife / Perth and Kinross	2000-07-28	6,918	56°24′0″N 3°5′0″W	UK13018	
Gladhouse Reservoir	Midlothian	1988-07-14	186	55°47′0″N 3°6′0″W	UK13021	
Greenlaw Moor	Scottish Borders	1996-03-15	248	55°44′0″N 2°27′0″W	UK13022	
Gruinart Flats, Islay	Argyll and Bute	1988-07-14	3,261	55°51′0″N 6°20′0″W	UK13023	
Inner Clyde Estuary	East Dunbartonshire / Inverclyde / Renfrewshire / West Dunbartonshire	2000-09-05	1,825	55°57′0″N 4°38′0″W	UK13024	
Inner Moray Firth	Highland	1999-07-22	2,339	56°50′0″N 4°21′0″W	UK13025	
Kintyre Goose Roosts	Argyll and Bute	1998-10-28	312	55°31′0″N 5°37′0″W	UK13027	
Lewis Peatlands	Na h-Eileanan Siar	2000-12-22	58,984	58°15′0″N 6°35′0″W	UK13028	
Loch an Duin	Na h-Eileanan Siar	1990-04-25	2,621	57°38′0″N 7°9′0″W	UK13029	
Loch Eye	Highland	1986-10-01	205	57°47′0″N 3°58′0″W	UK13031	
Loch Ken and River Dee Marshes	Dumfries and Galloway	1992-08-31	769	54°59′0″N 4°1′0″W	UK13032	
Loch Leven	Perth and Kinross	1976-01-05	1,612	56°12′0″N 3°23′0″W	UK13033	
Loch Lomond	Stirling / West Dunbartonshire	1976-01-05	237	56°4′0″N 4°30′0″W	UK13034	
Loch Maree	Highland	1994-09-19	3,174	57°41′0″N 5°28′0″W	UK13035	
Loch of Inch and Torrs Warren	Dumfries and Galloway	1999-02-02	2,111	54°50′0″N 4°52′0″W	UK13037	
Loch of Kinnordy	Angus	1994-03-29	85	56°40′0″N 3°3′0″W	UK13038	
Loch of Lintrathen	Angus	1981-07-24	217	56°41′0″N 3°11′0″W	UK13039	
Loch of Skene	Aberdeenshire	1986-10-01	121	57°9′0″N 2°21′0″W	UK13040	
Loch of Strathbeg	Aberdeenshire	1995-11-27	616	57°37′0″N 1°53′0″W	UK13041	
Loch Ruthven	Highland	1996-08-16	201	57°20′0″N 4°17′0″W	UK13042	
Loch Spynie	Moray	1992-08-31	94	57°41′0″N 3°17′0″W	UK13043	
Montrose Basin	Angus	1995-02-03	985	56°43′0″N 2°30′0″W	UK13046	
Moray and Nairn Coast	Highland / Moray	1997-02-02	2,412	57°39′0″N 3°44′0″W	UK13048	
Muir of Dinnet	Aberdeenshire	1999-07-22	158	57°5′0″N 2°55′0″W	UK13049	
North Uist Machair and Islands	Na h-Eileanan Siar	1999-07-22 (extended 2000-11-03)	4,705	57°32′0″N 7°23′0″W	UK13050	
Rannoch Moor	Perth and Kinross	1976-01-05	1,519	56°39′0″N 4°36′0″W	UK13051	
Rinns of Islay	Argyll and Bute	1990-04-25	3,571	55°51′0″N 6°23′0″W	UK13052	
River Spey – Insh Marshes	Highland	1997-02-02	1,159	57°5′0″N 4°0′0″W	UK13053	
Ronas Hill – North Roe and Tingon	Shetland	1997-08-11	5,470	60°33′0″N 1°25′0″W	UK13054	
Silver Flowe	Dumfries and Galloway	1981-07-24	620	55°7′0″N 4°24′0″W	UK13055	
Sléibhtean agus Cladach Thiriodh (Tiree Wetlands and Coast)	Argyll and Bute	2001-11-16	1,939	56°30′0″N 6°52′0″W	UK13056	
South Tayside Goose Roosts	Perth and Kinross	1993-04-22	331	56°16′0″N 3°50′0″W	UK13057	
South Uist Machair and Lochs	Na h-Eileanan Siar	1976-01-05	5,019	57°19′0″N 7°20′0″W	UK13058	
Upper Solway Flats and Marshes	Dumfries and Galloway / Cumbria	1986-10-01	43,637	54°54′0″N 3°25′0″W	UK11079	
Westwater	Scottish Borders	1995-11-27	50	55°45′0″N 3°24′0″W	UK13060	
Ythan Estuary and Meikle Loch	Aberdeenshire	1998-03-30	314	57°20′0″N 1°57′0″W	UK13061	

== See also ==
- Ramsar Convention
- List of Ramsar sites worldwide
