= Ramna Stacks =

Group of islands in Shetland Islands, Scotland

Coordinates: 60°39′43″N 1°18′43″W

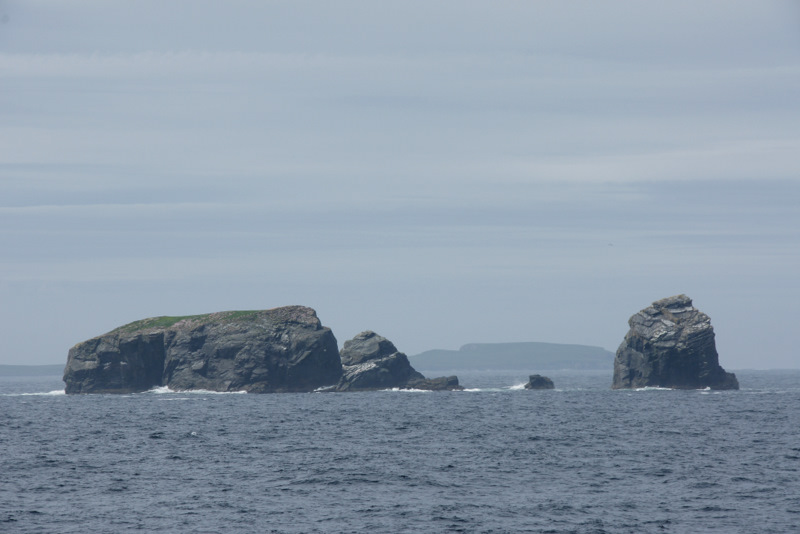
Fladda, Ofoora and Hyter

The Ramna Stacks are a group of skerries in the Shetland islands. They are north of the northern tip of Mainland, and along with nearby Gruney they are a special protection area on account of their birdlife.

From north to south they consist of:

- Gaut Skerries
- Outer Stack
- Scordar
- Turla
- Speolk
- Hyter (formerly Driter)
- Stab
- Ofoora
- Fladda (which has a natural arch and two caves)
- Flae-ass
- Barlcudda

Gruney and the islet of The Club lie just to the south of the Ramna Stacks.

The Ramna Stacks also lent their name to Welsh nu-jazz band, ramnastax.

== See also ==
- List of islands of Scotland
- List of Special Protection Areas in Scotland
- List of Shetland islands
