= Tain & District Field Club =

- Location: Tain, Ross-shire, Scotland
- Region served: Highland, Scotland
- Website: tainfieldclub.org.uk

In 1980, a Biology teacher at Tain Royal Academy expanded his adult evening class in natural history into a formal group which was to meet and receive lectures about natural history in general and biological topics related to the Tain area. Thus was started an unbroken series of lecture seasons and field excursions organised by the Tain & District Field Club.

TDFC members met in Tain Royal Academy until recently when the refurbished hall at the Tain Parish Church became the regular venue for lectures.

The intent throughout has been to deliver erudite lectures from specialists in their field and make field excursions to sites with Natural History interest; the publicly stated aim is "To encourage interest in natural history in this area by surveying and recording animals and plants and helping projects organised by conservation organisations".

Tain & District Field Club is fortunate in its location, surrounded by rich farmland, both mixed and monoculture, firths, woodlands, rivers and lochs such as Loch Eye, an important area for wintering greylag geese and whooper swans. Other important local sites where TDFC takes an active interest have been nesting ospreys, capercaillie (Scottish Gaelic: an coileach-fraoich) strongholds, Scottish crossbill habitat, and extensive mudflats important for feeding wading birds.

== TDFC Survey and Recording Activities ==
With their specific interests and skills TDFC members have managed or contributed to activities such as bird-ringing, cetacean-watch, osprey-watch, amphibian & reptile census, biological surveying, habitat recording, and site monitoring, largely participating in survey work co-ordinated by the Highland Biological Recording Group.

Tain & District Field Club members :

- contribute to butterfly and moth surveys and site monitoring for Butterfly Conservation Scotland;
- participate in estuary bird counts in the local Firths, bird atlas surveys and bird ringing projects for the British Trust for Ornithology;
- participate in goose counts on nearby major flyways and winter feeding grounds for the Wetlands & Wildfowl Trust;
- contribute locally to the work of the Royal Society for the Protection of Birds;
- provide wardening and publicity work on harrier and osprey watches in conjunction with the Forestry Commission;
- instigated one of the first surveys of the spread of speckled wood butterfly prior to other organisations' involvement.
- carried out bird counts for the Forestry Commission in Strathrory.
