= Kintyre Goose Roosts =

Series of lochs in western Scotland

- Kintyre Goose Lochs
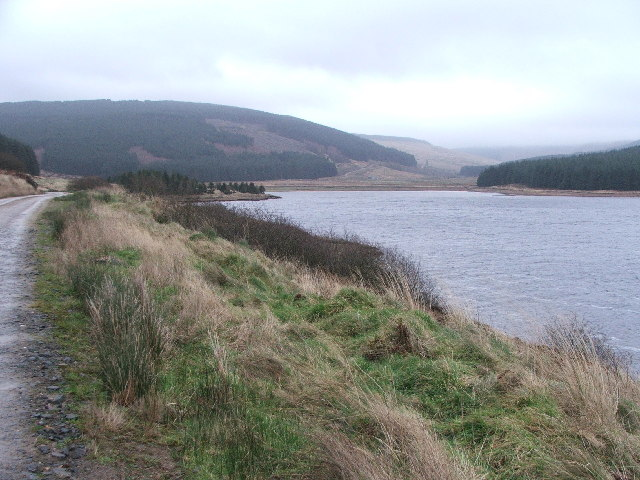
- The western shore of Loch Lussa, one of the five lochs that make up the Kintyre Goose Roosts
- Interactive map of Kintyre Goose Roosts
- Location: Argyll and Bute, Scotland
- Nearest city: Campbeltown
- Coordinates: 55.516667°N 5.616667°W
- Area: 3.12 km^{2} (1.20 sq mi)
- Established: 1998
- Governing body: Scottish Natural Heritage (SNH)

The Kintyre Goose Roosts are a group of five oligotrophic hill lochs on the Kintyre peninsula in Argyll and Bute, western Scotland. With a total area of 312 hectares, they have been protected as a Ramsar Site since 1998.

The roosts include Loch Garasdale, Loch an Fhraoich, Loch Lussa, Tangy Loch and Black Loch. These support an internationally important population of Greenland white-fronted geese, with 8.5% of the population over-wintering at the site. Tangy Loch is also notable for the presence of the nationally rare slender naiad (Najas flexilis).

As well as being recognised as a wetland of international importance under the Ramsar Convention, Kintyre Goose Roosts has also been designated a Special Protection Area and a Site of Special Scientific Interest.
