= Loch an Duin =

Protected coastal wetland in North Uist, western Scotland

- Interactive map of Loch an Duin
- Location: North Uist, Scotland
- Nearest city: Stornoway
- Coordinates: 57.654°N 7.15°W
- Area: 26.21 km^{2} (10.12 sq mi)
- Established: 16 August 1985
- Governing body: Scottish Natural Heritage

Loch an Duin is a complex system of freshwater, brackish and sea lochs, tidal channels and islands, on and close to North Uist off the west coast of Scotland. An area of 2,621 hectares has been protected since 1990 as a Ramsar Site.

The area under protection includes part of the north-eastern coastland of North Uist, as well as nearby islands and skerries in the Sound of Harris. It supports nationally important populations of common terns, around 1.5% of the UK breeding population, as well as providing habitat for otters. As the largest fjardic loch system in Britain, Loch an Duin has been recognised as a wetland of international importance under the Ramsar Convention, and additionally as a Site of Special Scientific Interest.
