= Tangy Loch =

Coordinates: 55°29′29″N 5°39′04″W

Tangy Loch, Kintyre, Scotland, is a small loch (lake) located in the centre of the peninsula. It is a Site of Special Scientific Interest. Tangy Loch Castle is a ruined fortification on an islet in the loch. The small village of Tangy nearby is also known as the first place in Scotland to grow oranges that were made into marmalade.
