= Great Yarmouth North Denes =

UK Site of Special Scientific Interest

Coordinates: 52.632°N 1.737°E

- Site of Special Scientific Interest
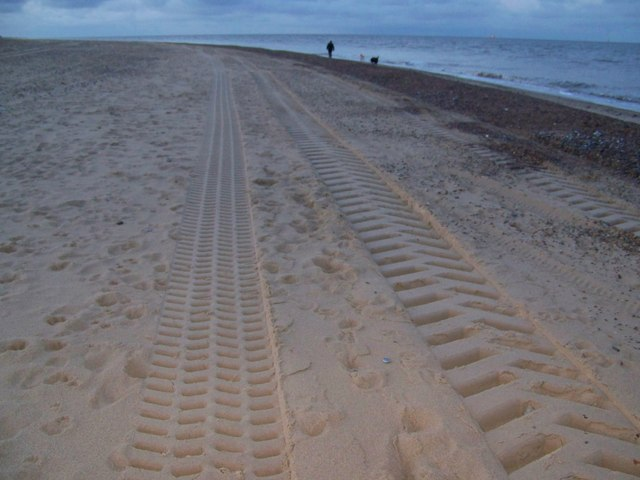
- Location of Great Yarmouth North Denes.
- Area of search: Norfolk
- Grid reference: TG 530 104
- Interest: Biological
- Area: 100.8 hectares (249 acres)
- Notification date: 1992
- Location map: Magic Map

Great Yarmouth North Denes is a 100.8-hectare (249-acre) biological Site of Special Scientific Interest in Great Yarmouth in Norfolk, England. It is a Nature Conservation Review site and a Special Protection Area.

These beaches have a complete succession of dune vegetation types, from foredunes to dry acid dune grassland, the latter of which is very extensive. The site has the largest breeding colony of little terns in Britain.

== History ==
The Denes were an extensive beach area on the east side of the walled town. Townsmen let their animals roam here. Also in the area are windmills that had been built since the time of Edward I, and were a source of complaint by the Cinque Ports men, who charged that they interfered with the drying of fishing-nets. In 1277, Edward ordered a limitation on the number of windmills there. This right to dry their nets there was part of the rights of "den and strond" granted the Cinque Ports men by Henry II; the nets were hung from ships' masts.

The beach at North Denes was also used as an area for building ships, while old, derelict ships abandoned there was another source of annoyance to the Portsmen.
