= North Uist Machair and Islands =

Protected wetland area in the Outer Hebrides, Scotland

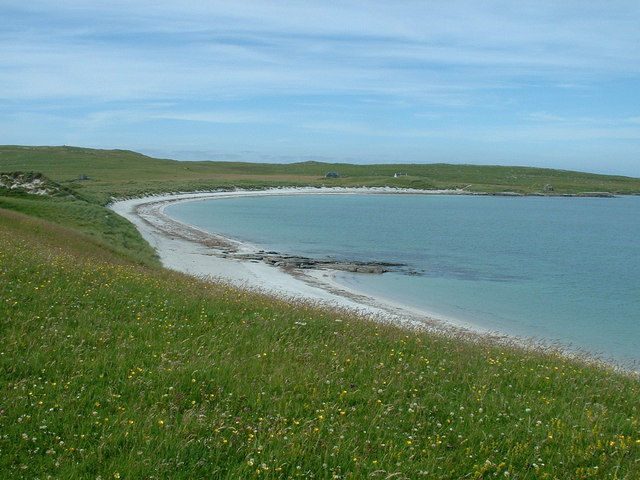
- Machair and beach on the island of Boreray, one of the sites that make up the North Uist Machair and Islands
- Interactive map of North Uist Machair and Islands
- Location: Outer Hebrides, Scotland
- Nearest city: Lochmaddy
- Coordinates: 57.680556°N 7.233333°W
- Area: 47.05 km^{2} (18.17 sq mi)
- Established: 22 July 1999
- Governing body: Scottish Natural Heritage

The North Uist Machair and Islands is a protected wetland area in the Outer Hebrides of Scotland. A total of 4,705 hectares comprises seven separate areas: four sites on the west and north coasts of North Uist, as well as the whole of the island of Boreray and parts of Berneray and Pabbay in the Sound of Harris. The site primarily contains machair areas, with a range of habitats including sand dunes, acid grassland and freshwater wetlands, including nutrient-rich marshes and fens, wet and dry machair and saltmarsh. It has been protected as a Ramsar Site since 1999.

The area supports nationally or internationally important populations of numerous birds, including greylag geese, barnacle geese, dunlin, corncrake and sanderling. The sites also contain the rare slender naiad.

As well as the North Uist Machair and Islands being recognised as a wetland of international importance under the Ramsar Convention, it has also been designated a Special Area of Conservation.
