= South Uist Machair and Lochs =

Protected wetland area in the Outer Hebrides, Scotland

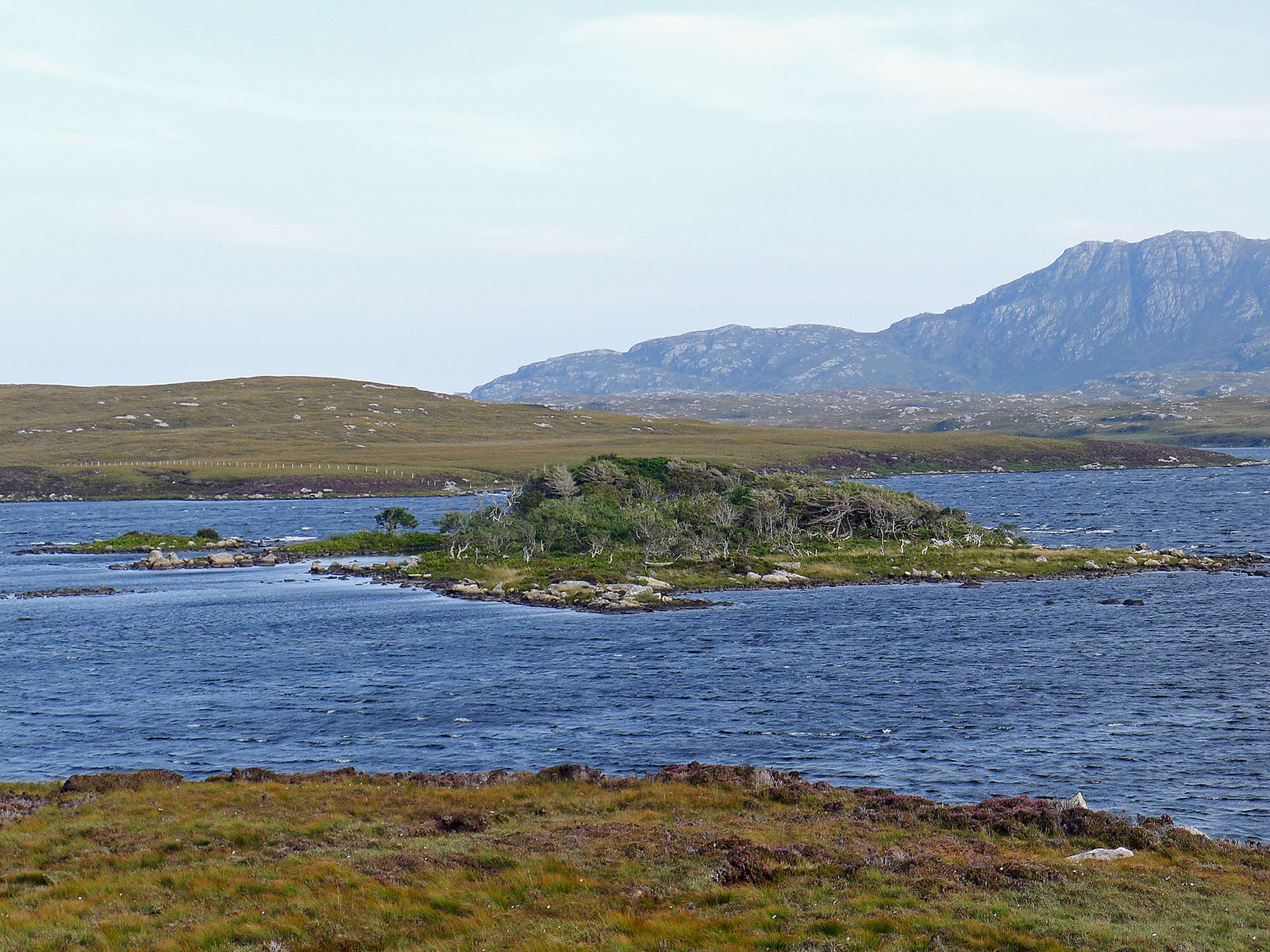
- A view across Loch Druidibeg, one of the wetland areas that make up the South Uist Machair and Lochs
- Interactive map of South Uist Machair and Lochs
- Location: Outer Hebrides, Scotland
- Nearest city: Benbecula
- Coordinates: 57.3162461°N 7.3483192°W
- Area: 50.19 km^{2} (19.38 sq mi)
- Established: 5 January 1976
- Governing body: Scottish Natural Heritage

The South Uist Machair and Lochs is a protected wetland area on the west coast of South Uist in the Outer Hebrides of Scotland. A total of 5,019 hectares contains blanket bog, oligotrophic lochs, wet and dry machair, fresh and saltwater marsh, coastal dunes and sandy and rocky shores. It includes the estuary waters of the Howmore River, as well as Loch Bi and Loch Druidibeg. It has been protected as a Ramsar Site since 1976.

The area supports nationally or internationally important populations of numerous birds, including corncrake, little tern and sanderling. The site also contains the rare slender naiad.

As well as the South Uist Machair and Lochs being recognised as a wetland of international importance under the Ramsar Convention, it has also been designated a Special Protection Area.
