= Inner Clyde Estuary =

Protected river estuary in western Scotland

- Interactive map of Inner Clyde Estuary
- Location: Scotland
- Nearest city: Glasgow
- Coordinates: 55.947222°N 4.633333°W
- Area: 18.26 km^{2} (7.05 sq mi)
- Established: 27 Mar 2000
- Governing body: Scottish Natural Heritage

The Inner Clyde Estuary is a nature reserve and protected wetland area in the estuary of the River Clyde, on the west coast of central Scotland. An area of 1,826 hectares (4,510 acres) has been designated since 2000 as a Ramsar Site, a Special Protection Area and a Site of Special Scientific Interest.

The protected area of the estuary stretches from Clydebank to Colgrain on the north bank, and from Erskine to Port Glasgow in the south. Although the surrounding areas are heavily industrialised, the tidal mudflats and saltmarsh of the river estuary support large numbers of waders and waterbirds. Internationally important populations of common redshank overwinter on the estuary, along with nationally important numbers of cormorants, eiders, goldeneyes, oystercatchers, red-breasted mergansers, red-throated divers and scaups.
