= Tangy Loch Castle =

Castle in the United Kingdom

- Tangy Loch, Kintyre, Scotland

Site information
- Condition: Ruin

Location
- Coordinates: 55.49105°N 5.64938°W

Tangy Loch Castle is a ruined fortified dwelling on an islet in Tangy Loch, Kintyre, Scotland. It is about 5 miles/8 km north of Campbeltown. It was formerly connected to land (about 150 metres away) by a causeway, which is now submerged. The MacEachan family held the castle in the 17th century.
