= Lochs of Spiggie and Brow =

Lake in the United Kingdom

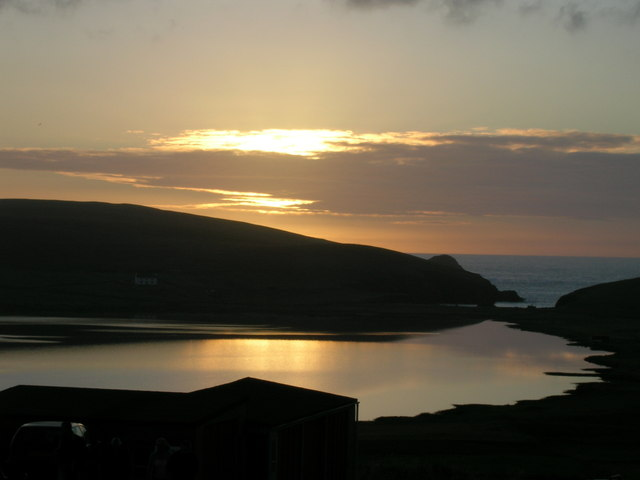
- Sunset over the Loch of Spiggie

- Location within Scotland
- Location: Dunrossness, Shetland, Scotland
- Coordinates: 59.93273°N 1.33622°W
- Max. width: 0.5 miles (0.80 km)

The Lochs of Spiggie and Brow are located west of Boddam in the parish of Dunrossness, in the South Mainland of Shetland, Scotland, about 6 km north of Sumburgh.

== Environment ==
The lochs are designated as a Special Protection Area and a Site of Special Scientific Interest for wildlife conservation purposes. The site has also been identified as an Important Bird Area (IBA) by BirdLife International because it supports wintering waterfowl, including whooper swans.

== Loch of Spiggie ==
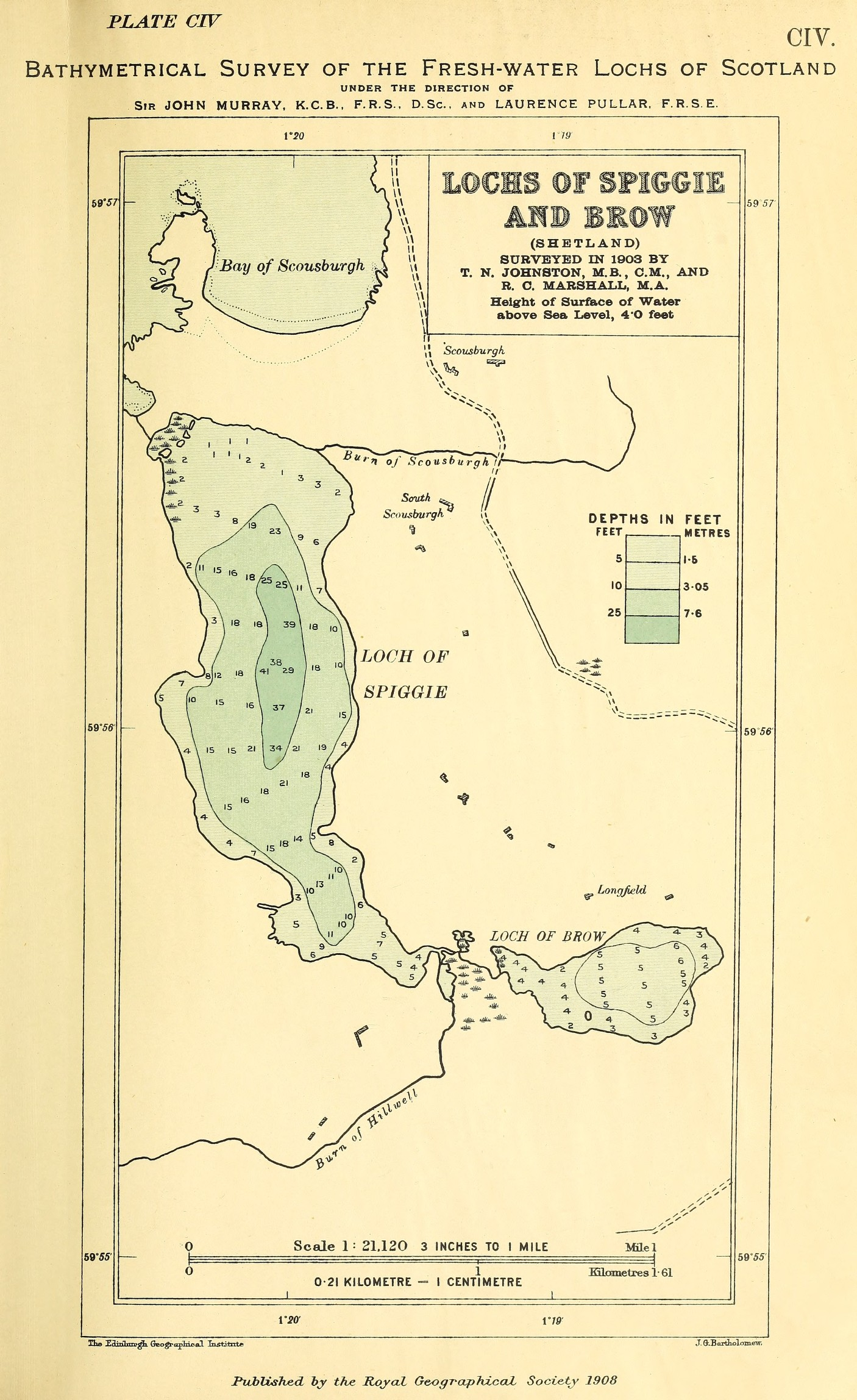
Bathymetrical Survey of the Lochs of Spiggie and Brow, Shetland from a survey in 1903

The Loch of Spiggie was historically a voe (Shetland Dialect: fjord or inlet) in which a sand bar formed, cutting off the sea. It is considered "the only moderately large loch" in the South Mainland of Shetland, and is the fourth longest loch in Shetland. It is roughly rectangular, with the longest dimension approximately north–south, and the maximum width is almost 0.5 miles (0.8 km); its area is roughly 1 km^{2}.

The loch is an RSPB nature reserve. The loch supports many species of birds, including lapwing, tufted duck, redshank, snipe and whooper swan. Additionally, various seasonal visiting birds also make use of the loch – in spring, long-tailed duck and skylark; and in summer, Eurasian oystercatcher, Eurasian curlew, mallard, arctic tern, black-legged kittiwake and great skua. The birds breed in the marshes and farmland next to the loch.

== Loch of Brow ==
The Loch of Brow is a smaller loch, about 0.25 km^{2} in area, lying to the south-east of the Loch of Spiggie, into which it outflows.

The remains of a broch can be found on a small island in the loch. It used to be accessible by a number of stepping-stones which formed a "rough causeway"; however, these now lie 2 feet (0.6 m) under water. The remnants of a circular hollow approximately 8.5 metres (28 ft) in diameter can be seen, which is thought to have been the interior lining of the broch. A small portion of an outward-facing wall was excavated at the north end that suggested the broch's walls may have been between 3.5–4.0 metres (11–13 ft) thick.

== Sources ==
- Murray, John, Sir; Pullar, Laurence; Chumley, James (1910). Bathymetrical survey of the Scottish fresh-water lochs. Vol. 2. Surveyed by T. N. Johnson and R. C. Marshall. Edinburgh: Challenger Office. pp. 244–245 – via archive.org.
- "Loch of Brow". Canmore.
- "Loch of Brow". UK Centre for Ecology & Hydrology. Archived from the original on 11 June 2016.
- "Loch of Spiggie". UK Centre for Ecology & Hydrology. Archived from the original on 11 June 2016.
- "Loch of Spiggie". RSPB.
