= Eilean na Muice Duibhe =

Protected wetland in Islay, western Scotland

- Duich Moss
- Interactive map of Eilean na Muice Duibhe
- Location: Islay, Scotland
- Nearest city: Bowmore
- Coordinates: 55.722222°N 6.255556°W
- Area: 5.76 km^{2} (2.22 sq mi)
- Established: 1988
- Governing body: Scottish Natural Heritage (SNH)

Eilean na Muice Duibhe, also known as Duich Moss, is an area of low-level blanket mire on the island of Islay, off the west coast of Scotland. Located south of the town of Bowmore and with an area of 576 hectares, the area has been protected as a Ramsar Site since 1988.

The site includes an unusual transition from blanket bog to raised mire habitats. It supports an internationally important population of white-fronted geese, with 2% of the Greenland population overwintering at the site. Breeding birds include the common redshank, red-throated loon and hen harrier.

As well as being recognised as a wetland of international importance under the Ramsar Convention, Eilean na Muice Duibhe has also been designated a Special Protection Area.
