= Loch of Kinnordy =

Loch in Angus, Scotland

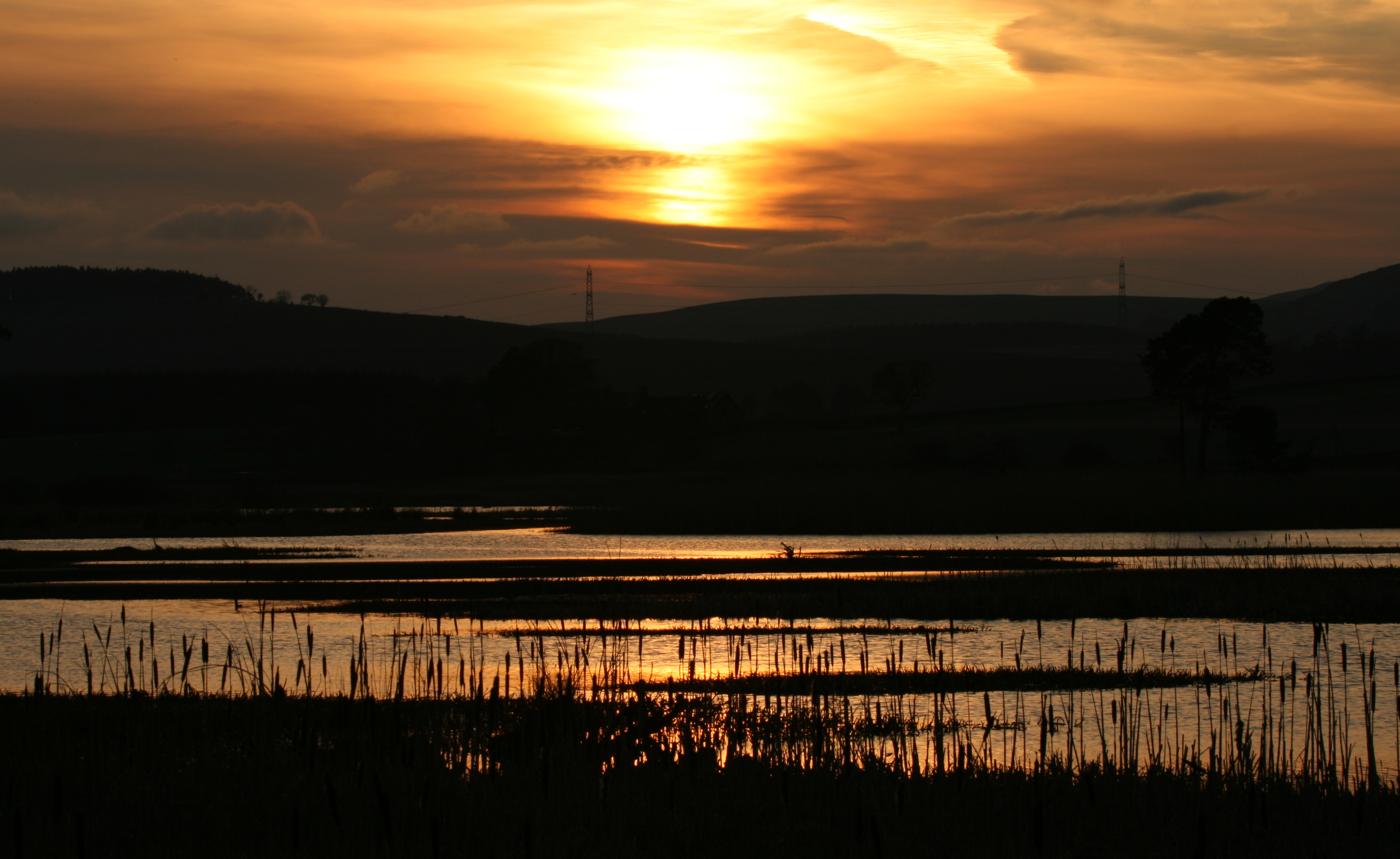
- Sunset over Loch of Kinnordy
- Interactive map of Loch of Kinnordy
- Location: Angus, Scotland
- Nearest city: Kirriemuir "town"
- Coordinates: 56.675°N 3.05°W
- Area: 0.85 km^{2} (0.33 sq mi)
- Established: 1994
- Governing body: Joint Nature Conservation Committee

Loch of Kinnordy is a small loch located just west of town of Kirriemuir in Angus, Scotland, which is an important wildlife habitat. The loch itself is approximately 22 hectares, though this has varied over time with drainage attempts and the silting up of the outflow stream. Including surrounding fen, swamp and mire, 85 hectares are protected as a Ramsar Site.

Loch of Kinnordy is a eutrophic loch which supports a number of rare species of wetland plants and migratory birds. There are internationally important numbers of greylag geese, with 1% of the Iceland population overwintering at the site. Black-headed gulls, pink-footed geese, water rails and whooper swans occur in nationally important numbers, along with otters, red squirrels, butterflies and dragonflies.

As well as being recognised as a wetland of international importance under the Ramsar Convention, Loch of Kinnordy has been designated a Special Protection Area and Site of Special Scientific Interest. The loch and surrounding area is also maintained as a nature reserve by the RSPB, with a car park, hides overlooking the loch and a bird-feeding station.

In 2018 the badly burnt body of Steven Donaldson, a 27-year-old man was found by the burnt out wreck of a car in the nature reserve car park. Police Scotland's Digital Forensics Unit investigated this as a murder, using records obtained from mobile phones.
