= East Sanday Coast =

Protected wetland area in Orkney, northern Scotland

- Interactive map of East Sanday Coast
- Location: Orkney, Scotland
- Coordinates: 59.266667°N 2.516667°W
- Area: 15.15 km^{2} (5.85 sq mi)
- Established: 1997
- Governing body: Joint Nature Conservation Committee

The East Sanday Coast is a protected wetland area on and around the island of Sanday, the third-largest of the Orkney islands off the north coast of Scotland. With a total protected area of 1,515 hectares, the 55 kilometre stretch of coast includes rocky and sandy sections, sand dunes, machair habitats, intertidal flats, and saltmarsh. It has been protected as a Ramsar Site since 1997.

The area supports a large number of over-wintering waders and waterbirds, including internationally important populations of purple sandpiper and ruddy turnstone. It is also important for breeding populations of great black-backed gulls and common seals.

As well as the East Sanday Coast being recognised as a wetland of international importance under the Ramsar Convention, the whole of the island of Sanday has been designated a Special Area of Conservation.
