= South Tayside Goose Roosts =

Series of lochs in central Scotland

Coordinates: 56°15′49″N 3°49′39″W

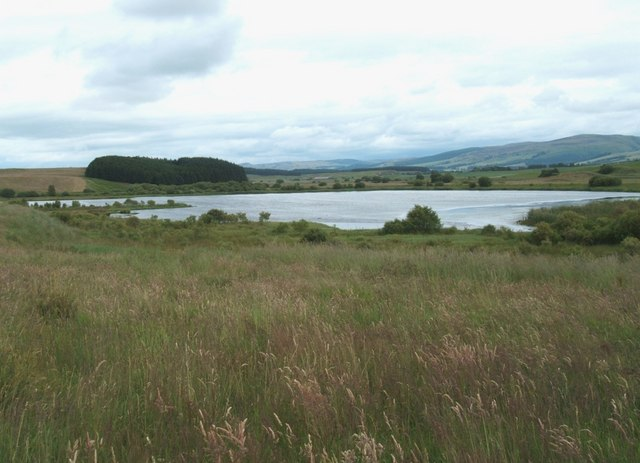
- Carsebreck Loch, one of several lakes that make up the South Tayside Goose Roosts
- Interactive map of South Tayside Goose Roosts
- Location: Tayside, Scotland
- Nearest city: Perth
- Area: 3.31 km^{2} (1.28 sq mi)
- Established: 1993
- Governing body: Scottish Natural Heritage (SNH)

South Tayside Goose Roosts is a composite wetland site to the west of Perth in central Scotland, covering a total of 331 hectares, which has been protected as a Ramsar Site since 1993. Incorporating three disconnected sections, separated by several kilometres, the site contains seven freshwater lochs along with other wetland habitats, including one of the largest raised bogs in the region.

The site is contiguous with three Sites of Special Scientific Interest:

- Carsebreck and Rhynd Lochs SSSI, containing Lower Rhynd, Upper Rhynd and Carsebreck Loch, as well as the raised bog known as Shelforkie Moss.
- Drummond Lochs SSSI, containing Drummond Pond and Bennybeg Pond.
- Dupplin Lakes SSSI, containing Dupplin Loch and Pitcairnie Loch.

The roosts support internationally important populations of greylag geese and pink-footed geese. As well as being recognised as a wetland of international importance under the Ramsar Convention, South Tayside Goose Roosts has also been designated a Special Protection Area and a Special Area of Conservation.
