= Greenlaw Moor =

Protected area of heather moorland in southern Scotland

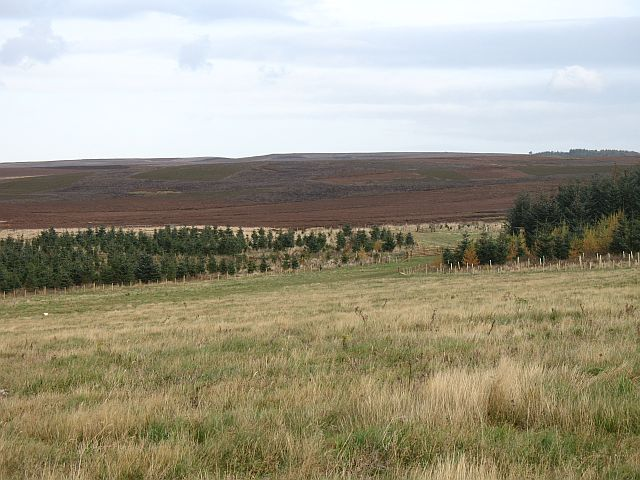
- Interactive map of Greenlaw Moor
- Location: Scottish Borders, Scotland
- Nearest city: Berwick-upon-Tweed
- Coordinates: 55.7346879°N 2.4948555°W
- Area: 2.48 km^{2} (0.96 sq mi)
- Established: 1996
- Governing body: Scottish Natural Heritage (SNH)

Greenlaw Moor is an area of raised heather moorland in the foothills of the Lammermuir Hills, in the Scottish Borders area of Scotland. Located north of the town of Greenlaw and with an area of 248 hectares, the moor has been protected as a Ramsar Site since 1996.

This site consists of two small freshwater pools set within an area of heather moorland. It supports an internationally important population of pink-footed geese, with 3.5% of the population passing through in the spring and autumn.

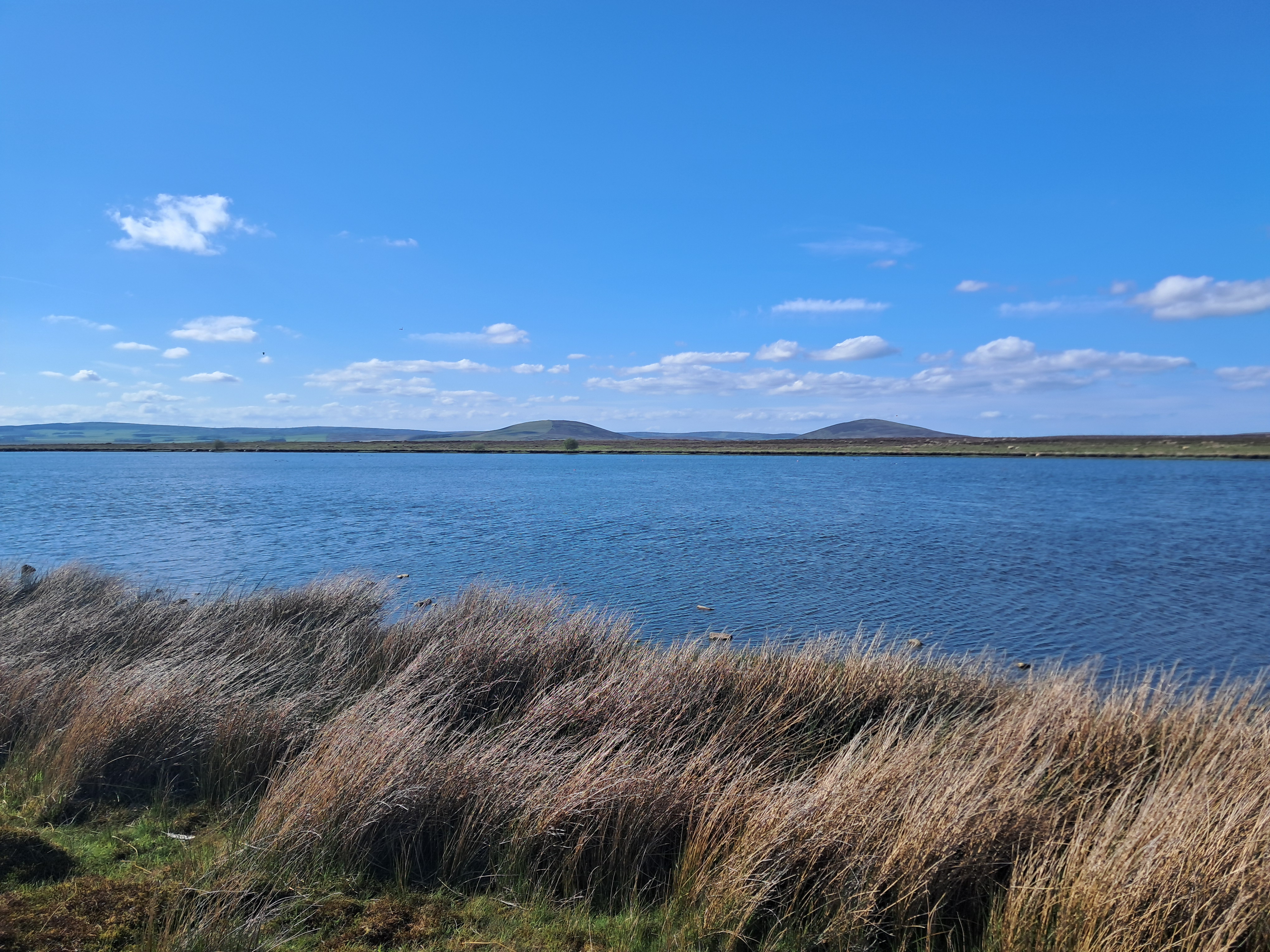
Hule Moss on Greenlaw Moor

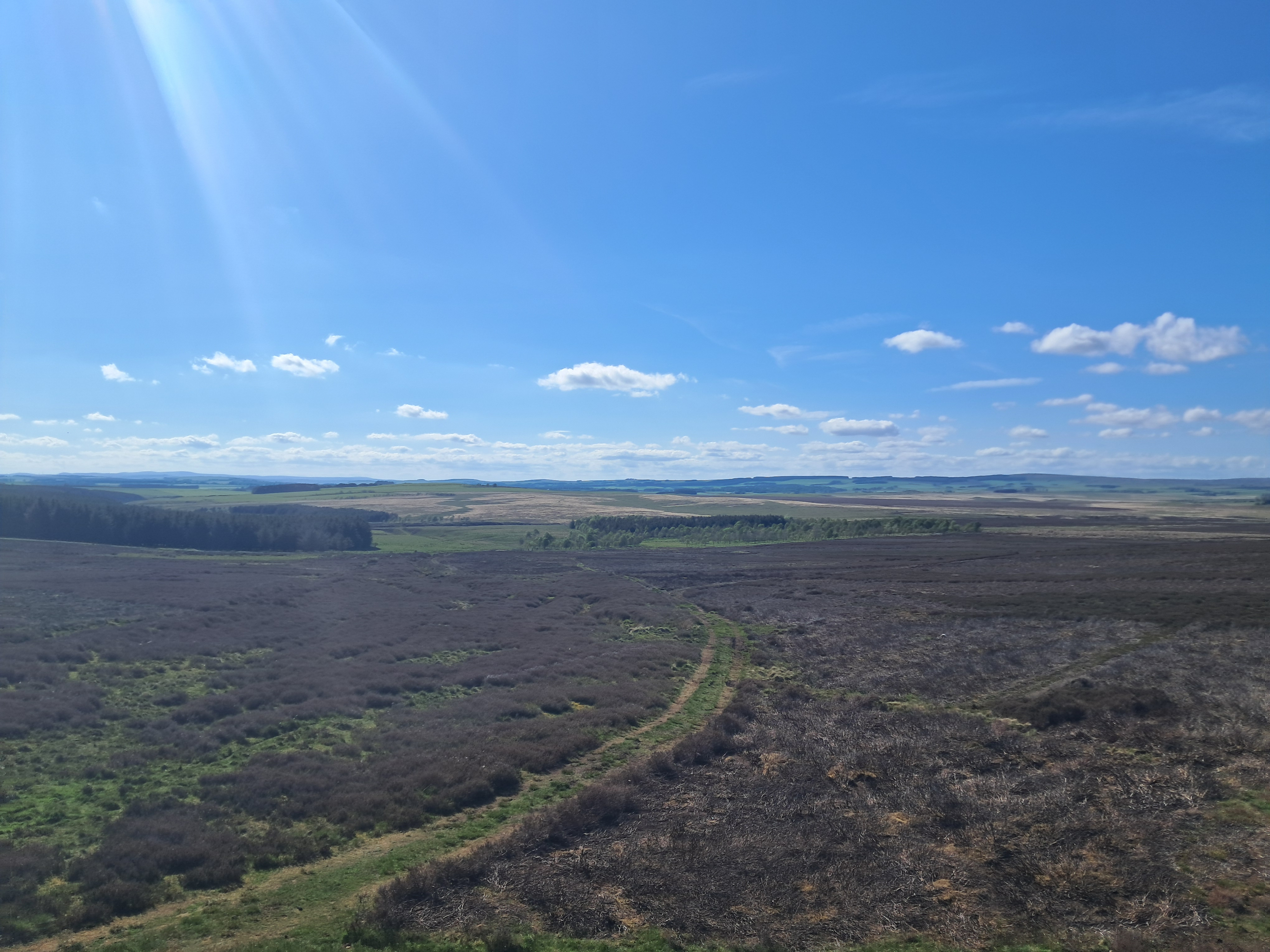
Greenlaw Moor May 2026

As well as being recognised as a wetland of international importance under the Ramsar Convention, Greenlaw Moor has also been designated a Special Protection Area and a Site of Special Scientific Interest. The SSSI designation has been in place since 1987, and covers a wider area, a total of 1,172 hectares.
