= Priest Island =

Island in the Summer Isles, Scotland

Eilean a' Chlèirich (Gaelic)
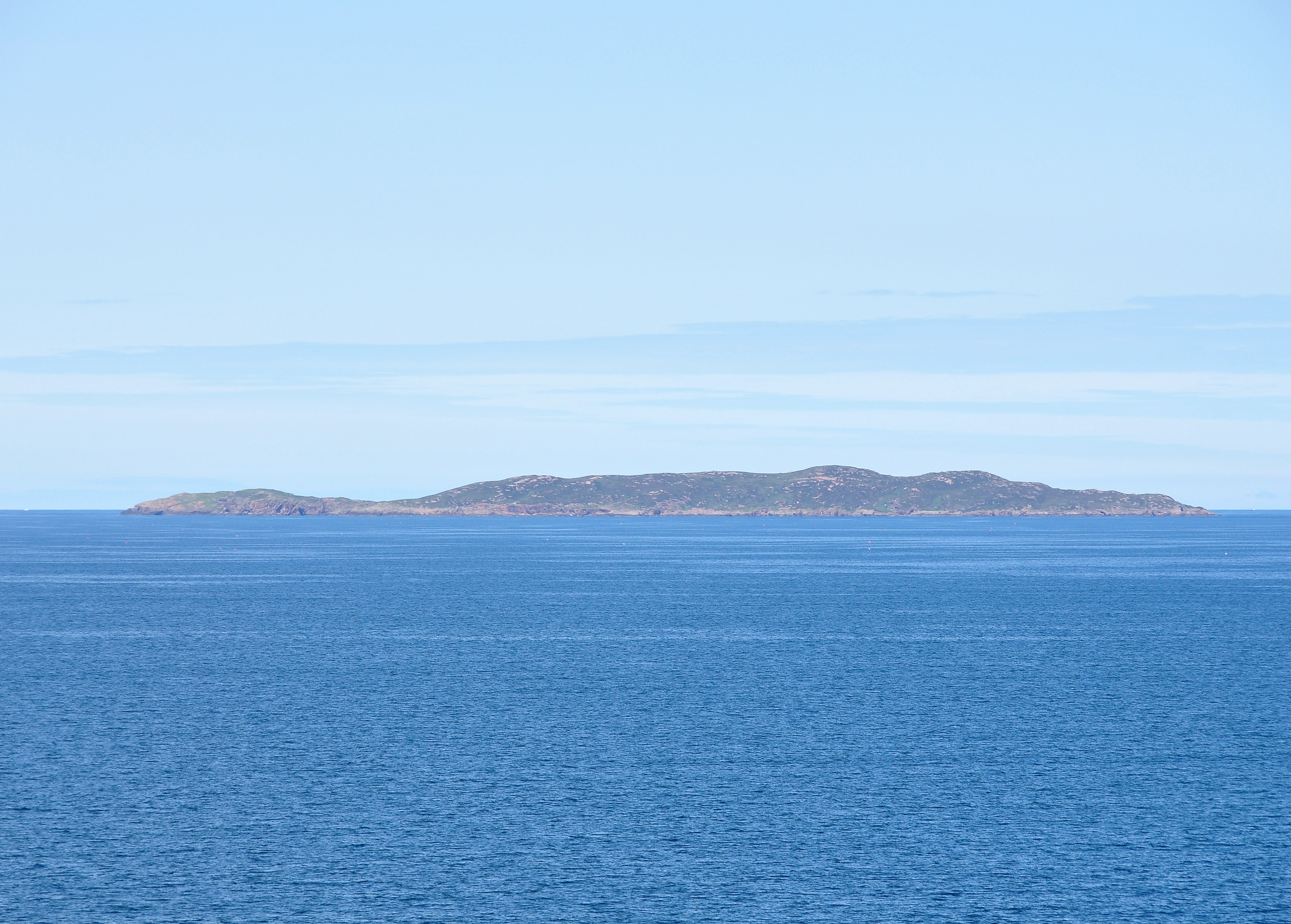

Location
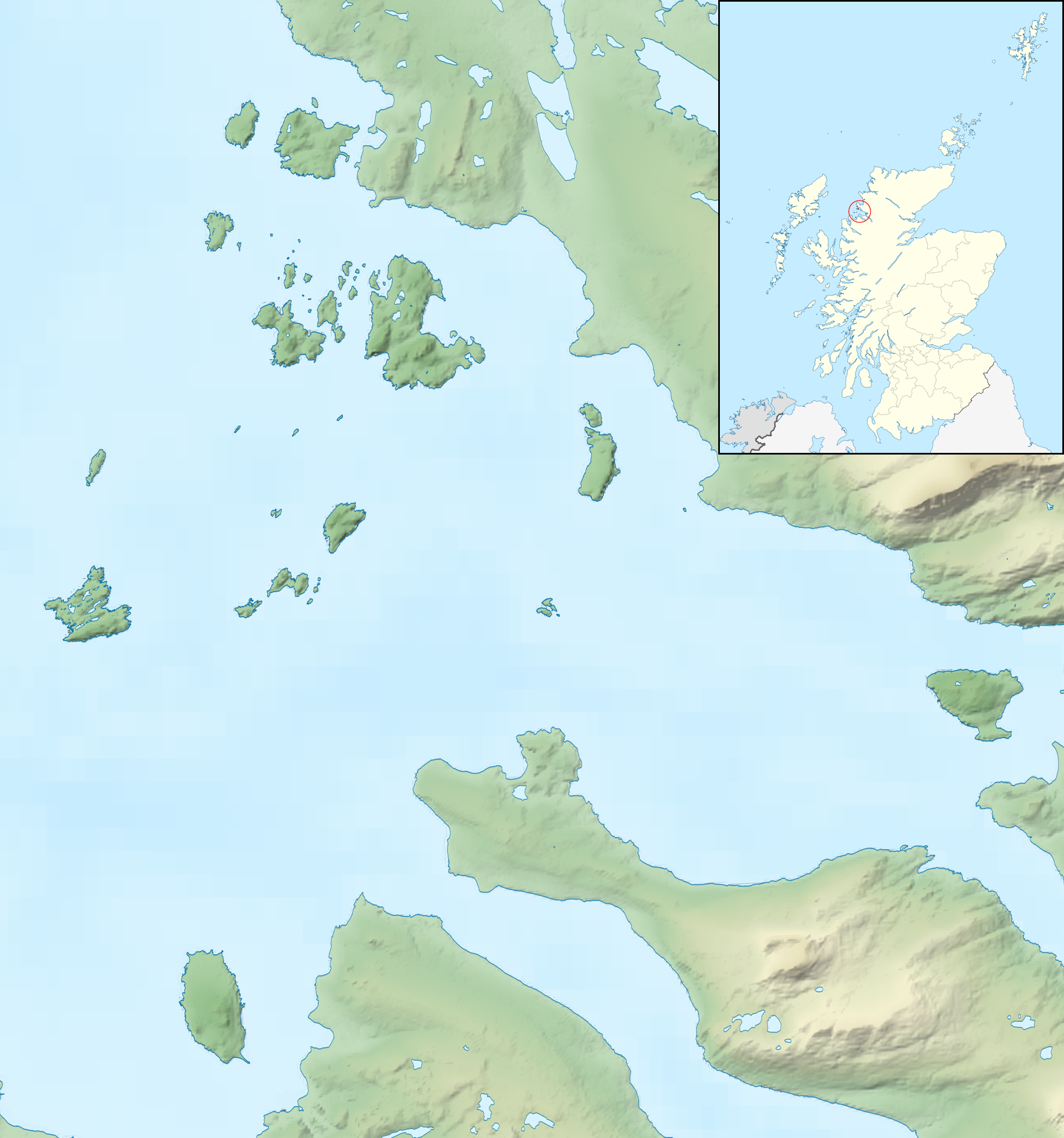
- Priest Island shown within the Summer Isles Priest Island shown within the Highlands
- OS grid reference: NB925025
- Coordinates: 57.96°N 5.51°W

Name
- Name meaning: Priest Island

Physical geography
- Island group: Summer Isles
- Area: 122 ha (300 acres)
- Area rank: 136=
- Highest elevation: 78 m (256 ft)

Administration
- Council area: Highland
- Country: Scotland
- Sovereign state: United Kingdom

Demographics
- Population: 0

Priest Island (Scottish Gaelic: Eilean a' Chlèirich) is a small, uninhabited island in the Summer Isles off the west coast of Scotland.

== History ==
According to the Gazetteer for Scotland the island was an "early Christian retreat" and has several stone circles. Haswell-Smith refers to "three prehistoric stone circles" and a "prehistoric stone circle ... beside the burn" that had been dug up and placed there by the naturalist John Harvie Brown.

When Harvie Brown visited the island on 4 July 1884 he "saw the remains of old crofts, and a curious and perfect circle of stones, lying flat on their sides with the smaller ends towards a common centre, and sunk flush with the surface of the short green sward". Harvie Brown noted the "highly polished surface of these nine stones when I first saw them in situ .... as if done by human hands (or feet)". On his second visit he found the stones gone, and on his fourth visit, in 1903, he searched for the stones in the surrounding area, collected nine he was fairly sure were the originals, and placed them in a new location but in the original plan. His drawing of the time shows a feature of circa 4 m in diameter. He also noted that there were "at least two, if not more, similar stone circles ... which were not far removed in distance from this principal circle, but these were of smaller dimensions and not formed with so perfectly flat stones".

Frank Fraser Darling, who lived on the island for a while, refers to Harvie Brown seeing "what he thought was a stone circle" and his reconstruction of the feature on an adjacent site: "they lie there still, and as the sheep graze over them, they do not disappear".

Jim Miller and John Bellord, two men on the run from the law, aided and abetted by Geoff Green, hid on Priest Island for nearly a year, from September 1975 until the summer of 1976. Their story made front-page headlines and was the subject of two television documentaries: BBC Everyman: Miller and Bellord, in 1980 and another made by Cineflix, a Canadian film company in 2008.

The 1794 Statistical Account states that "there is a large 'cove' on the south side of Priest Island, said to have been the alternative home of a 'Popish priest'." According to the "Scotland's Places" website (which collates information from various national databases including RCAHMS) this "cove" is probably one of the caves on the island, possibly at NB927016 which "has been divided by a drystone wall from floor to roof with an opening for communication between the two compartments". They note that Fraser Darling found a midden there, although all trace of it has now gone. They make no reference to stone circles.

== Geography ==
Priest Island is the outermost and most exposed of the Summer Isles, lying about 6 km off the west coast of Wester Ross.

== Wildlife ==
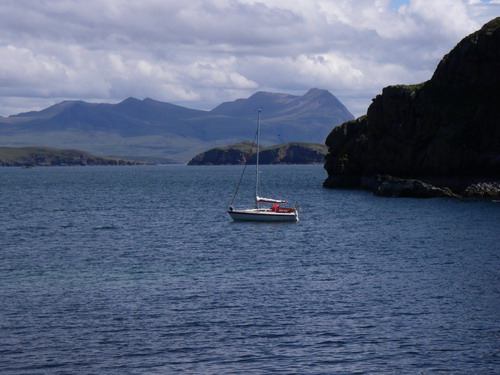
Priest Island beneath Ben Mor Coigach.

Eilean a' Chleirich is owned and managed as a nature reserve by the Royal Society for the Protection of Birds. It is a SSSI and a Special Protection Area. Non-avian fauna includes pygmy shrews, otters and grey seals.

Priest Island supports heath communities and a small amount of woodland. Enrichment from salt spray and bird guano enables more species-rich maritime heath and cliff communities to exist around the coast. The island has one of the largest storm petrel (Hydrobates pelagicus) colonies in the UK, together with other breeding seabirds.

In the summer of 1960, a group from an English school studied some of the bird life of the island. Pupils and teachers from Whitgift School in South Croydon spent two weeks on the island with official permission to study and ring some of the birds, such as storm petrels at night time (netting and ringing) and shags on the cliffs in daytime. They took a month's supplies with them, including food, tents and equipment totalling quarter of a ton on a trek cart pulled over from Garve Station.

== See also ==
- List of islands of Scotland
