= Caithness Lochs =

Series of lochs in northern Scotland

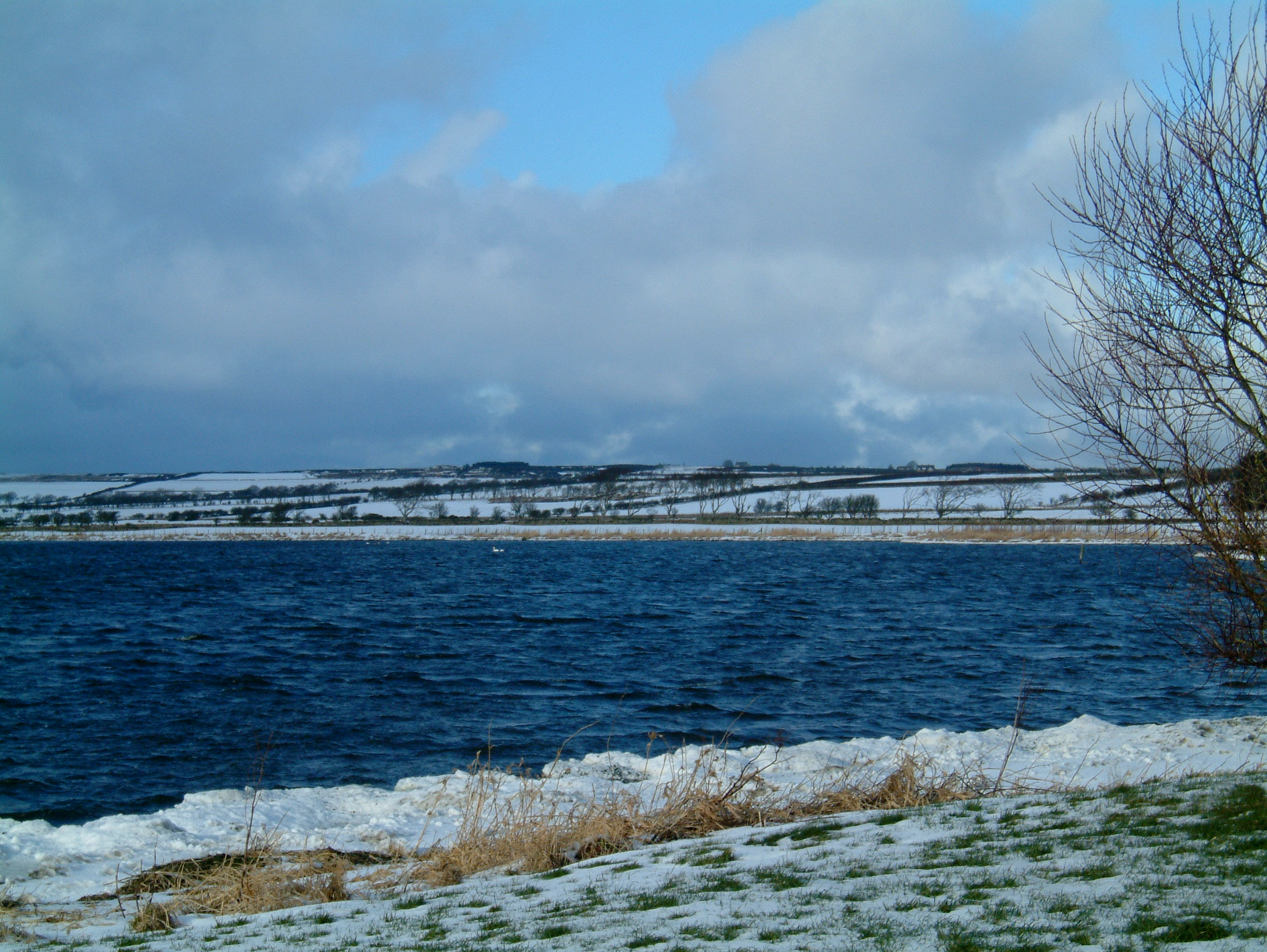
- Loch Watten, one of the Caithness Lochs
- Interactive map of Caithness Lochs
- Location: Highland, Scotland
- Coordinates: 58.491667°N 3.33333°W
- Area: 13.79 km^{2} (5.32 sq mi)
- Established: 1998 (extended 2000)
- Governing body: Scottish Natural Heritage (SNH)

Caithness Lochs is a protected wetland area in the historic county of Caithness in the far north of Scotland. With a total area of 1,379 hectares, it covers six freshwater lochs and a complex area of fen and swamp, and has been protected as a Ramsar Site since 1998.

The area comprises seven distinct wetlands, each of which is a Site of Special Scientific Interest: Broubster Leans, Loch of Mey, Loch Calder, Loch Heilen, Loch of Wester, Loch Scarmclate and Loch Watten. These provide a variety of habitats for waterfowl and wading birds, including internationally important populations of greylag geese, white-fronted geese and whooper swans. It is also important for several species of reed, pondweed and water sedge.

As well as being recognised as a wetland of international importance under the Ramsar Convention, Caithness Lochs has also been designated a Special Protection Area and a Special Area of Conservation.
