= Loch of Lintrathen =

Loch in Angus, Scotland

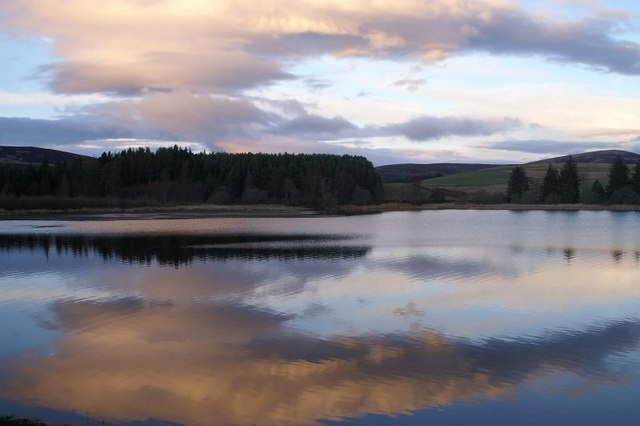
- Loch of Lintrathen at dusk

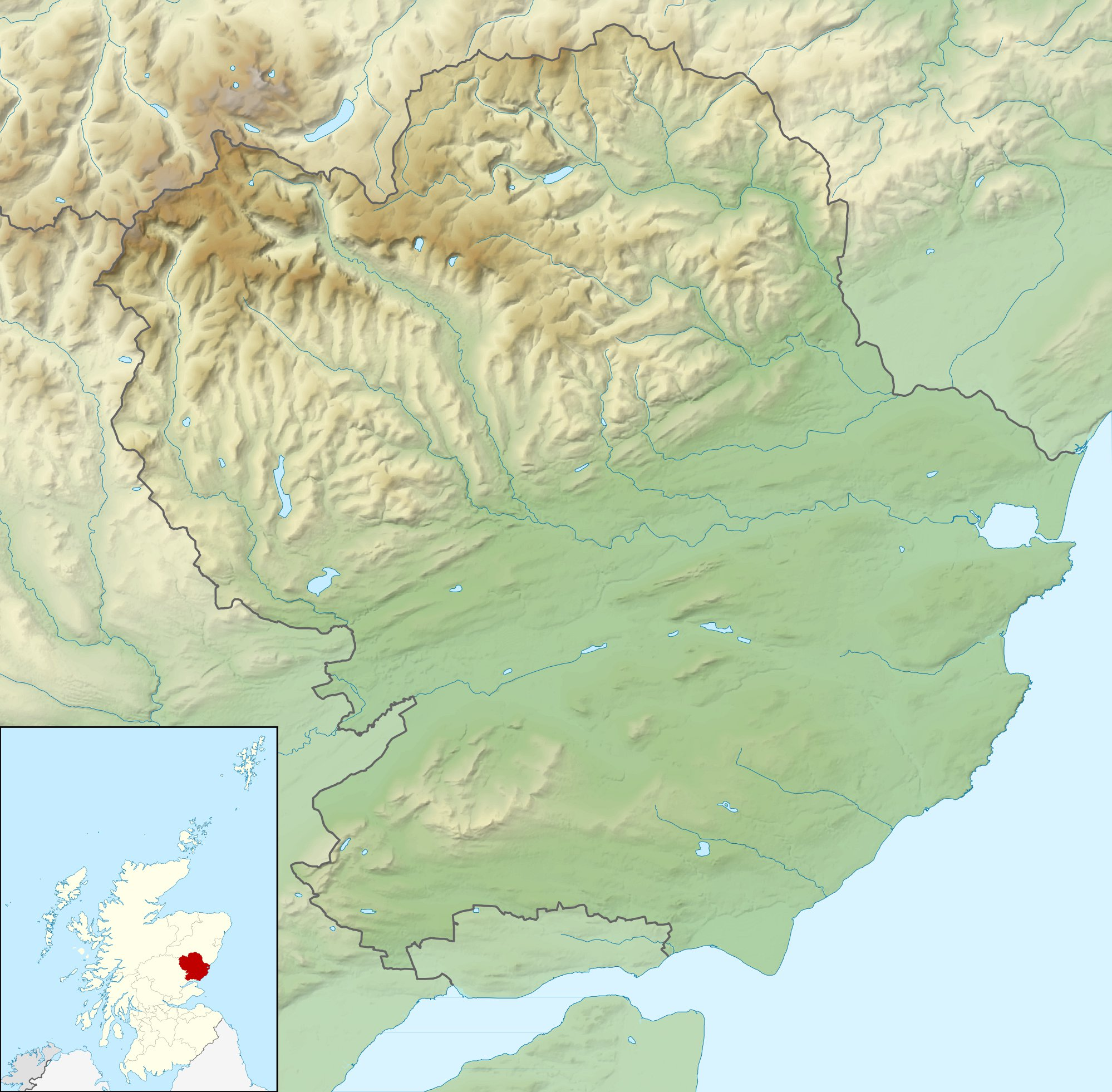
- Location in Angus
- Location: NO27765487
- Coordinates: 56.68030167°N 3.18285226°W
- Type: freshwater loch
- Max. length: 2 km (1.2 mi)
- Max. width: 1.2 km (0.75 mi)
- Surface area: 169 ha (420 acres)
- Average depth: 23.29 ft (7.10 m)
- Max. depth: 69.88 ft (21.30 m)
- Water volume: 423,213,862 ft^{3} (11,984,082.0 m^{3})
- Shore length^{1}: 8 km (5.0 mi)
- Surface elevation: 205 m (673 ft)
- Max. temperature: 55.5 °F (13.1 °C)
- Min. temperature: 48.0 °F (8.9 °C)
- Islands: 0
- Settlements: Kirriemuir
- ^{1} Shore length is not a well-defined measure.

Loch of Lintrathen is a man-made loch occupying a glacial basin at the southern end of Glen Isla, approximately 13 kilometres (8.1 miles) west of town of Kirriemuir in Angus, Scotland.

The small village of Bridgend of Lintrathen lies on the southern shore of the loch, which is owned by Scottish Water and used as a water supply reservoir as well as an important wildlife site. The loch has been the main water supply for the city of Dundee and Angus since 1875. The water in the Loch of Lintrathen feeds down from Backwater Reservoir 4 kilometres (2.5 miles) to the north and exits it via sluices at Bridgend of Lintrathen, flowing southward past Lintrathen Mill in the ‘Melgam Water’, which has a confluence with the River Isla 3 kilometres (1.9 miles) farther south at Airlie Castle. The loch has a surface area of 151.1 hectares (373 acres) and its dam is an earthworks dam.

Loch of Lintrathen is a mid-altitude oligotrophic-mesotrophic loch, which supports large numbers of birds. There are internationally important numbers of greylag geese, with 3% of the Iceland population over-wintering at the site. Other wildlife includes whooper swans, otters and osprey, and the loch is used for trout fishing. The fishing is managed by the Lintrathen Angling Club and both brown and rainbow trout are fished for.

As well as being recognised as a wetland of international importance under the Ramsar Convention, Loch of Lintrathen has also been designated a Special Protection Area and a Site of Special Scientific Interest. The Ramsar Site includes an area of marshland in the north-west, a total of 217 hectares being protected. The loch and surrounding area is also maintained as a nature reserve by the Scottish Wildlife Trust.
