= Moray and Nairn Coast =

Protected wetland area in western Scotland

- Interactive map of Moray and Nairn Coast
- Location: Grampian and Highland, Scotland
- Nearest city: Elgin
- Coordinates: 57.648333°N 3.73°W
- Area: 24.12 km^{2} (9.31 sq mi)
- Established: 2 February 1997
- Governing body: Joint Nature Conservation Committee

The Moray and Nairn Coast is a protected wetland site on the southern shore of the Moray Firth, in the west of Scotland. A total of 2,412 hectares comprises two areas: intertidal flats, saltmarsh and sand dunes at Findhorn Bay and Culbin Bar, and alluvial deposits and woodland of the lower River Spey and Spey Bay. It has been protected as a Ramsar Site since 1997.

The area supports a large number of over-wintering waders and waterbirds, including internationally important populations of greylag geese and long-tailed ducks. Other important birdlife includes ospreys, bar-tailed godwits, pink-footed geese and common redshanks.

As well as the Moray and Nairn Coast being recognised as a wetland of international importance under the Ramsar Convention, it has also been designated a Special Area of Conservation.
