= Fala Flow =

Protected area of upland bog in southern Scotland

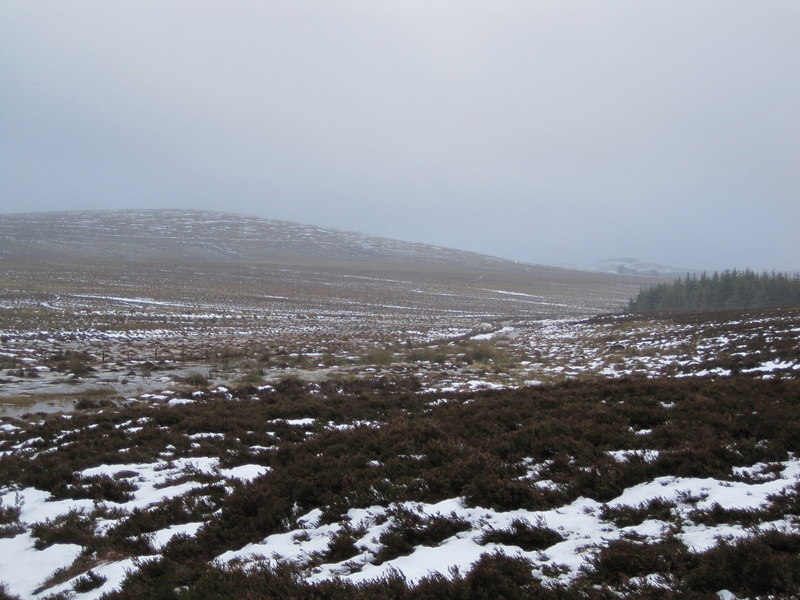
- Interactive map of Fala Flow
- Location: Midlothian, Scotland
- Nearest city: Edinburgh
- Coordinates: 55.8165422°N 2.9161051°W
- Area: 3.18 km^{2} (1.23 sq mi)
- Established: SSSI/SPA 1986, Ramsar site 1990
- Governing body: Scottish Natural Heritage (SNH)

Fala Flow or Fala Moor is an area of upland blanket bog on the edge of the Lammermuir Hills, in Midlothian, Scotland. Located north of the village of Fala, around 15 km south east of Edinburgh, an area of 318 hectares has been designated as a Ramsar Site since 1990.

The site is a blanket upland mire with some pools, developed at a lower altitude than most blanket bogs in Midlothian. It supports an internationally important population of pink-footed geese, with around 3% of the Greenland and Iceland populations overwintering at the site.

As well as being recognised as a wetland of international importance under the Ramsar Convention, Fala Flow has also been designated a Special Protection Area and a Site of Special Scientific Interest. The SSSI designation has been in place since 1986 and was last assessed in 2016.
