= Lewis Peatlands =

Peatland in western Scotland

- Interactive map of Lewis Peatlands
- Location: Lewis, Scotland
- Coordinates: 58.25°N 6.5833°W
- Area: 589 km^{2} (227 sq mi)
- Established: 2000
- Governing body: Scottish Natural Heritage (SNH)

Lewis Peatlands (Scottish Gaelic: mòinteach Leòdhais) is a large area of blanket bog covering more than one third of the Isle of Lewis, off the west coast of Scotland. With a total area of 58,984 hectares, it is one of the largest and most intact known areas of blanket bog in the world, and is the second largest Ramsar site in Scotland.

The site contains a near-continuous mantle of blanket bog, with oligotrophic and mesotrophic small pools and lochans. It supports a diverse range of breeding waterfowl, including internationally important numbers of dunlin (up to 30% of the world population), and nationally important populations of numerous other species including the black-throated diver, golden eagle and golden plover.

Lewis Peatlands has been recognised as a wetland of international importance under the Ramsar Convention, and has been designated a Special Protection Area. A little under half of the area has also been designated as a Special Area of Conservation.
