= Loch Eye =

Protected wetland in Highland, Scotland

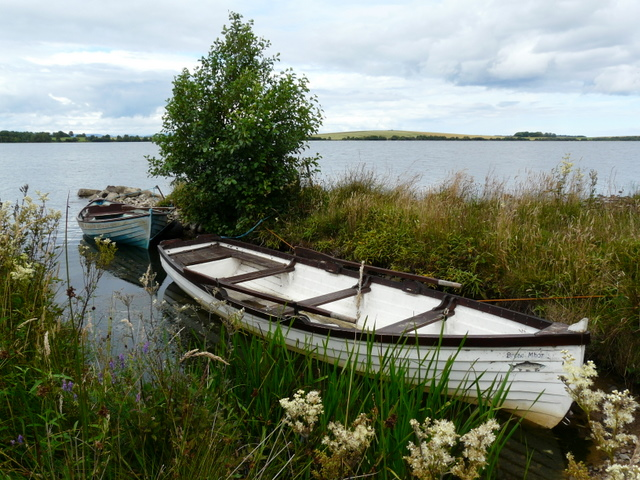
- A rowing boat at Loch Eye
- Interactive map of Loch Eye
- Location: Highland (council area), Scotland
- Nearest city: Inverness
- Coordinates: 57.791667°N 3.966667°W
- Area: 2.05 km^{2} (0.79 sq mi)
- Established: 1 October 1986
- Governing body: Scottish Natural Heritage

Loch Eye is a shallow freshwater loch, located close to the east coast of Scotland between the Moray Firth, Dornoch Firth and Cromarty Firth. Covering an area of 205 hectares, it is an important site for waterfowl and has been protected since 1986 as a Ramsar Site, a Special Protection Area and a Site of Special Scientific Interest.

Loch Eye is nutrient rich, and one of the most important eutrophic lochs north of the Highland boundary fault. It supports internationally important overwintering populations of waterfowl, in particular whooper swans and Icelandic greylag geese.
