= Loch Vaa =

Lake in the Highlands of Scotland

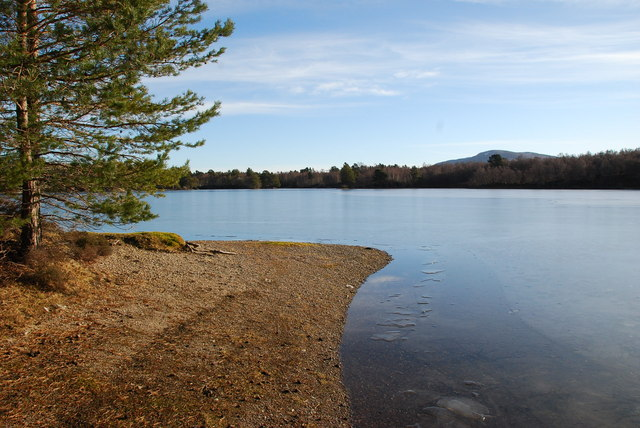
- View from the bank

- Location within Scotland Location within the United Kingdom
- Location: Scotland, United Kingdom
- Coordinates: 57°14′06″N 3°48′03″W
- Type: Freshwater loch
- Primary inflows: Spring-fed
- Basin countries: Scotland
- Surface area: 39 acres (16 ha)

Loch Vaa is a small freshwater loch in Highland, Scotland. It is located between Boat of Garten and Aviemore in the Cairngorms National Park. It is used for fishing, swimming and boating and its wooden boathouse is a popular location for tourists and photographers. The loch also contains the remains of a historic crannog structure. In 2018–19 the loch was subject to a dramatic drop in water levels over a dry winter period and was not restored to usual levels until prolonged rainfall in July 2019.

== Description ==
Loch Vaa is a 39-acre (16 ha) spring-fed freshwater loch which is said to have "gin clear" waters. The loch is owned by a local estate but a number of businesses have been granted rights for fishing, swimming and boating activities. The fishery is managed and the loch is stocked with brown and rainbow trout; it is also frequented by wild grebe. The loch's wooden boathouse, which is used for fishing, is surrounded by water and is a popular destination for tourists and photographers.

The loch contains the remains of a crannog, a historic fortified structure constructed on an artificial island. Birch timber recovered from the Loch Vaa crannog dates it to the 13th century, though the structure may be even older - dating back to the time of the Picts or earlier Iron Age peoples.

== 2018–2019 water loss ==
Between September 2018 and May 2019 the loch suffered a dramatic drop in water levels. Over this period some 35,000,000 imperial gallons (160,000,000 litres) of water were lost, causing the water level to fall by 1.4 metres (4.6 feet). By mid-September boats were unable to use the famous boathouse, which soon became accessible by dry land; the owner even considered relocating the structure. By May 2019 the loch fell to its lowest level in 750 years and archaeological experts were called in to check the historic crannog remains. The crannog was found to have been undamaged by the loss of water, which is key to prevent the remains from deteriorating, but came close with the water level just centimetres above the surviving timbers.

Local councillor Bill Lobban called for a full investigation into the water level issues by public bodies. The Scottish Environment Protection Agency (SEPA) claimed that the cause was the comparatively dry winter of 2018/19 which had led to low groundwater levels in the area. There was some suspicion directed at Scottish Water which had recently drilled a new borehole at Aviemore. However they claimed that their borehole was located 3 miles (4.8 km) upstream and that the local glacial geology isolated the loch from the abstraction site. Water levels rose significantly by early July 2019 following 37 days of rain and were at a 20-year high by 2020.

== Gallery ==
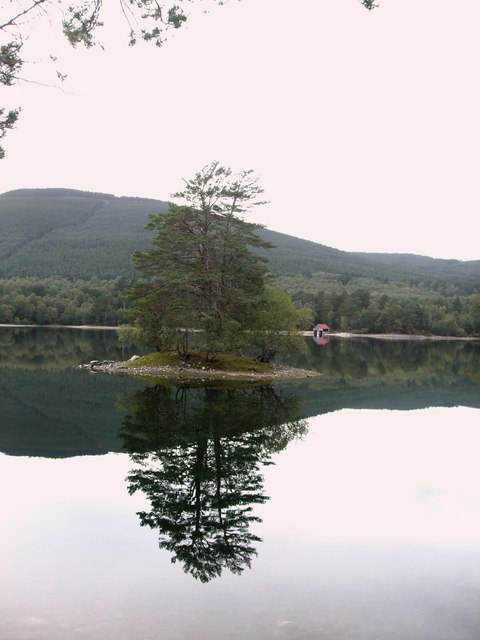
The crannog island

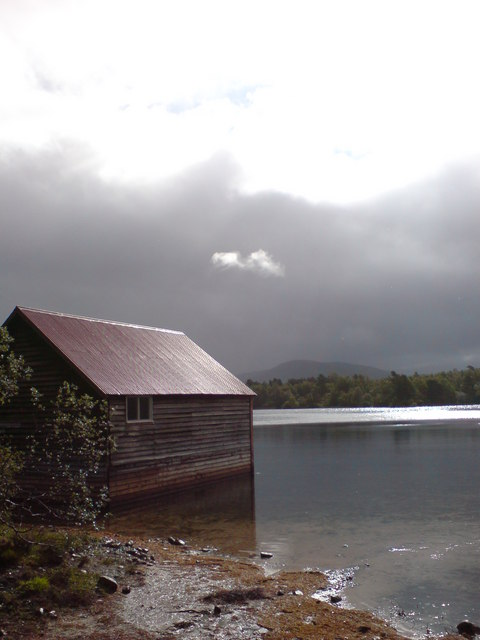
Boathouse

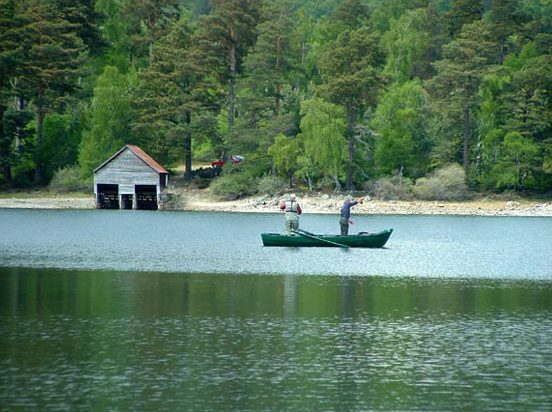
Fishermen on the loch
