= Loch Ruthven =

Lake in the United Kingdom

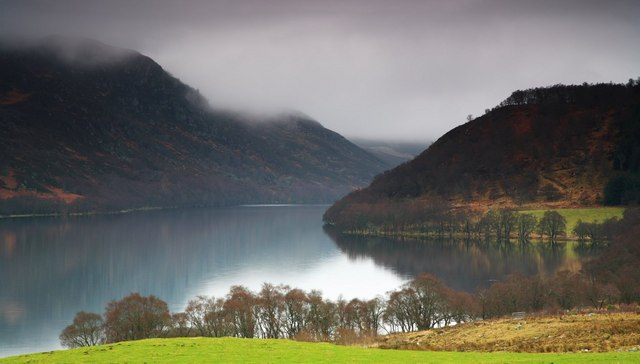

- Location within Highland
- Location: Highland
- Coordinates: 57.318°N 4.293°W
- Type: loch, mesotrophic
- Basin countries: Scotland
- Max. length: 3.62 km (2.25 mi)
- Max. width: 0.87 km (0.54 mi)
- Surface area: 368 acres (149 ha)
- Average depth: 11 ft (3.4 m)
- Max. depth: 42 ft (13 m)

Ramsar Wetland
- Designated: 16 August 1996
- Reference no.: 855

Loch Ruthven is a large loch which lies to the southeast of Loch Ness in the Highland region of Scotland. It is 2.25 miles (3.62 km) long, extends over an area of 368 acres (149 ha) and is up to 42 feet (13 m) deep. The most important breeding site in the UK for Slavonian grebes, it has one of the highest populations of this species in Europe. These rare birds can also be found in several other local lochs. The RSPB has established a reserve at Loch Ruthven.

Loch Ruthven was designated a Site of Special Scientific Interest (SSSI) on 18 May 1987. Loch Ruthven was designated a Ramsar site on 31 August 1992. Loch Ruthven SSSI is also Loch Ruthven Special Protection Area (SPA) for the Slavonian grebe. In addition Loch Ruthven is designated a Special Area of Conservation as a body of inland water, for the plant species associated with it, and as a habitat for otters.
