= Cameron Reservoir =

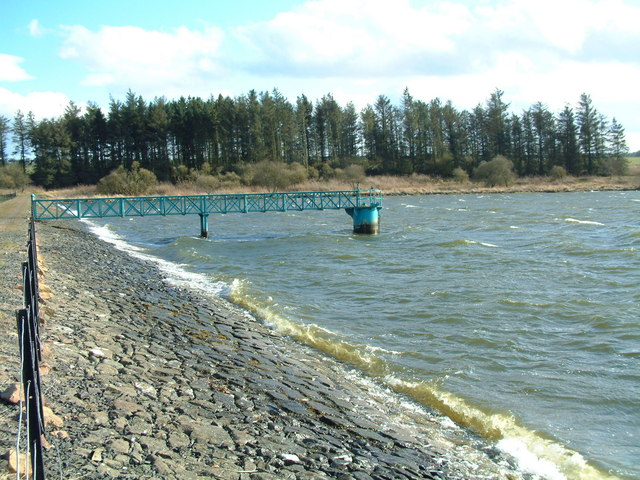
- Cameron Reservoir, east dam

- Location within Scotland
- Location: Cameron, Fife, Scotland
- Coordinates: 56.290°N 2.854°W
- Type: reservoir
- Surface area: 43 hectares (110 acres)

Cameron Reservoir is an artificial loch in the parish of Cameron in east Fife, Scotland. Covering an area of 43 hectares (110 acres), the reservoir is fed by a catchment of 558 hectares (1,380 acres) and its surface level is 146 metres (479 ft) above ordnance datum. Most of the catchment area is to the south and south-west of the loch.

== Ecology ==
Cameron Reservoir contains beds of aquatic and marginal vegetation and is an important over-wintering location for pink-footed geese. It has been recognised as a wetland of international importance under the Ramsar Convention, and has been designated a Site of Special Scientific Interest and Special Protection Area. The protected area is around 69 hectares (170 acres) as it includes some land surrounding the reservoir. Besides the geese, the reservoir also provides habitat for breeding populations of great crested grebe, coot and tufted duck which are of regional importance.

== History ==
Construction of the reservoir was completed in 1911. The engineers William and James Watson produced a book of lithographs in 1908 to show details of the waterworks scheme, including the reservoir, as part of the parliamentary approvals process. The book is held by National Records of Scotland. The reservoir was owned by St Andrews town council until the passing of the Water (Scotland) Act 1967, when responsibility for water supply moved from local authorities to one of 13 regional water boards, which in St Andrews case was the Fife and Kinross Water Board. Ownership changed again in 1974, when the provision of drinking water became the responsibility of Fife Regional Council, following the passing of the Local Government (Scotland) Act 1973. Further changes occurred under the Local Government etc. (Scotland) Act 1994, when ownership passed to the East of Scotland Water Authority in 1996, one of just three regional water authorities covering the whole of Scotland. These three merged in 2002, when all water supply in Scotland became the responsibility of Scottish Water as a result of the Water Industry (Scotland) Act 2002.

Earth embankment dams at the east and west end impound the water, with outflow from the east end forming the Cameron Burn, which is a tributary of Kenly Water. It served as a domestic water supply for St Andrews and was managed by Scottish Water. It is no longer used for this purpose, and is leased to St Andrews Angling Club by Fife Council, who own the fishing rights. There is a population of brown trout, and the club regularly stock the reservoir with rainbow trout. Anglers can fish from the banks or from a small number of boats.

== Bibliography ==
- Matthews, Hugh; Gardiner, Vince (1999). The Changing Geography of the UK (3rd ed.). Routledge. ISBN 978-0-415-17901-0.
- SRM (2008). "Structure of the UK Water Industry". Water Research Centre. Archived from the original on 3 May 2017.
