= Muirkirk & North Lowther Uplands Special Protection Area =

Special Protection Area in Dumfries and Galloway, Scotland

Muirkirk & North Lowther Uplands Special Protection Area is an extensive area of moorland extending south from near Darvel in northern Ayrshire to near Kirkconnel in Dumfries and Galloway. The SPA is of outstanding interest for its variety of upland habitats and breeding birds.

There are large tracts of blanket bog, wet and dry heaths and upland grasslands which provide a diversity of habitats that supports a rich variety of moorland breeding birds.

== External links about the Special Protection Area ==
- Muirkirk
- "Birdlife Data Zone". Birdlife Fact Sheet for Airds Moss and Muirkirk Uplands
- "JNCC - Adviser to Government on Nature Conservation". Joint Nature Conservation Committee
- "Moorland management schemes launched". 7 March 2003. Scottish Executive announcement of launch of SPA on 7 March 2003
- Scottish Natural Heritage
- UK Biodiversity Action Plan for Black Grouse

55°30′35″N 04°04′35″W
