= Bridgend Flats =

Marsh near Bridgend, Scotland

Coordinates: 55.77687°N 6.26349°W

- Site of Special Scientific Interest
- Location of Bridgend Flats.
- Area of search: Bridgend, Islay
- Grid reference: NR 330620
- Area: 331 ha (820 acres)
- Notification date: 1988

Bridgend Flats is an area of mudflats and saltmarsh near the village of Bridgend on the island of Islay off the west coast of Scotland. Covering an area of 331 hectares, it is situated around the outflow of the River Sorn into Loch Indaal.

Bridgend Flats is an important over-wintering location for the Greenland population of the barnacle goose. It has been recognised as a wetland of international importance under the Ramsar Convention, and has been designated a Site of Special Scientific Interest and Special Protection Area.
