= Insh Marshes =

Protected area in Highland, Scotland

Insh Marshes National Nature Reserve
- IUCN category IV (habitat/species management area)
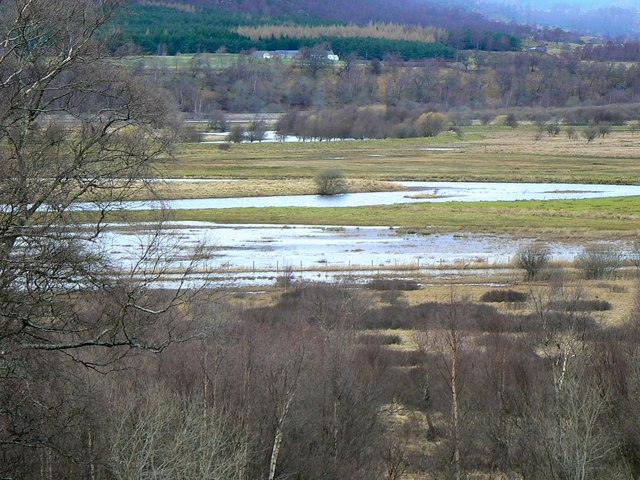

- Location within Highland
- Location: Badenoch and Strathspey, Highland, Scotland
- Coordinates: 57.091°N 3.993°W
- Area: 695 ha (1,720 acres)
- Designation: NatureScot
- Established: 2003
- Owner: Royal Society for the Protection of Birds (RSPB)
- Website: Insh Marshes NNR

Ramsar Wetland
- Official name: River Spey - Insh Marshes
- Designated: 2 February 1997
- Reference no.: 889

Insh Marshes are an area of floodplain of the River Spey between Kingussie and Kincraig in Badenoch and Strathspey, Highland, Scotland. The marshes are said to be one of the most important wetlands in Europe. They lie at an altitude of approximately 220–240 m (720–790 ft) above sea level, and form one of the largest areas of floodplain mire and fen vegetation in Scotland.

The marshes cover around 11 km^{2} (4.2 sq mi), and hold a number of conservation designations. 7 km^{2} (2.7 sq mi) of the area is owned and managed by the Royal Society for the Protection of Birds (RSPB), and forms a national nature reserve. The RSPB has laid out several waymarked trails, and provided two bird hides to allow visitors to appreciate the area and its birdlife.

== Flora and fauna ==
The marshes are dominated by sedge plants, with the boreal species string sedge and water sedge being present. The site is one of only two in Britain for string sedge (the other being Loch Naver at Altnaharra). It also supports many other flowering plants including least water-lily, awlwort, cowbane and shady horsetail.

Many rare wetland invertebrates can be found at Insh Marshes, including various species of flies, beetles and moths. It is the only site in Britain at which the spider Wabasso replicatus has been identified. Other notable invertebrate species present include the aquatic beetle Donacia aquatica, the fly Tipula marginella, the horse-fly Hybomitra lurida and the snipe-fly Thereva inornata. The birch woodlands above the marshes are home to several moth species, including Rannoch sprawler and cousin german. In October 2014, a species of insect called Molanna angustata, a type of caddisfly that inhabits Wales and England up to the Lake District and Yorkshire was identified here. Genevieve Dalley, a RSPB Scotland trainee ecologist discovered and identified two males caught in a moth trap at the marshes near Kingussie: the species had not previously been recorded in Scotland.

Arctic charr spawn along the River Spey and its side-streams, and the area provides an ideal habitat for otter.

The Insh Marshes are most noted for the many species of birds that breed here each summer. Breeding species include osprey, ducks such as Eurasian wigeon, shoveler and goldeneye, and waders including redshank, snipe, curlew and lapwing. The marshes also receive winter visitors including greylag geese from Iceland and up 200 whooper swans.

== Conservation designations ==
In addition to being a national nature reserve (NNR), the marshes hold several other conservation designations. The marshes, together with a stretch of the River Spey, form a designated Site of Special Scientific Interest (SSSI) entitled "River Spey - Insh Marshes", that covers just under 1,160 ha (2,870 acres). The area of the SSSI is also designated as both a Special Protection Area (SPA) and a Special Area of Conservation under the Natura 2000 programme, as well as being a listed site under the Ramsar Convention.

The Insh Marshes national nature reserve is classified as a Category IV protected area by the International Union for Conservation of Nature.
