= Gruney =

Gruney Lighthouse
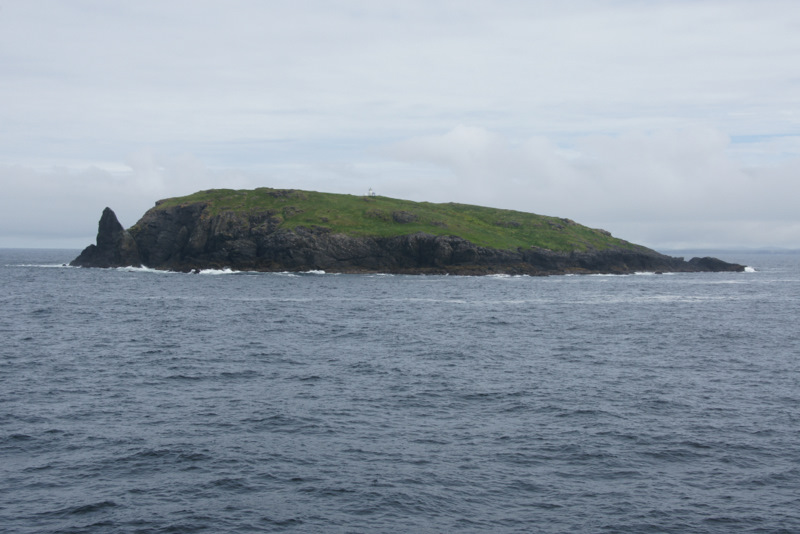
- Isle of Gruney
- Location: Gruney Isle; Shetland; Scotland; United Kingdom
- Coordinates: 60.652884°N 1.303184°W

Tower
- Constructed: 1976 (first)
- Foundation: concrete base
- Construction: metal skeletal tower
- Automated: 1976
- Height: 7 metres (23 ft)
- Shape: quadrangular tower covered by aluminium panels with light on the top
- Markings: white tower
- Power source: solar power
- Operator: Royal Society for the Protection of Birds

Light
- First lit: 2004 (current)
- Deactivated: 2004 (first)
- Focal height: 53 metres (174 ft)
- Range: 8 nmi (15 km; 9.2 mi) (white), 6 nmi (11 km; 6.9 mi) (red)
- Characteristic: Fl WR 5s.

Gruney is a small, uninhabited island in Shetland, Scotland. It lies north of the Northmavine peninsula of the Shetland Mainland, from which it is separated by the Gruney Sound.

Gruney has a population of Leach's petrels, one of just two in Shetland. It is not a National Nature Reserve, but the RSPB has a management agreement with the owners.

The island is also home to a lighthouse.

== See also ==
- List of islands in Scotland
- List of lighthouses in Scotland
- List of Northern Lighthouse Board lighthouses
