= Castle Loch, Lochmaben =

Lake in southern Scotland

Castle Loch
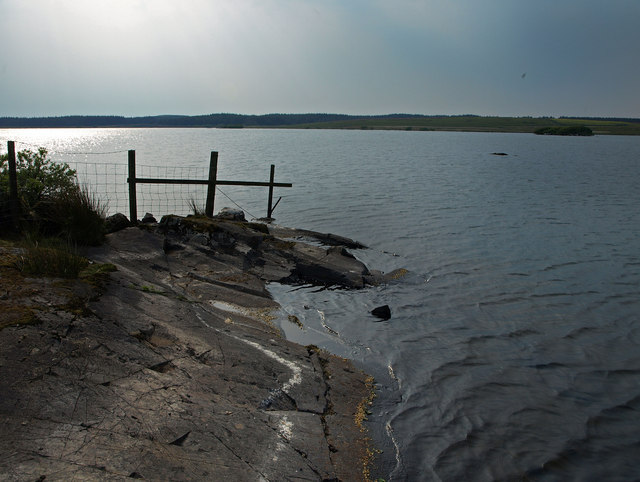

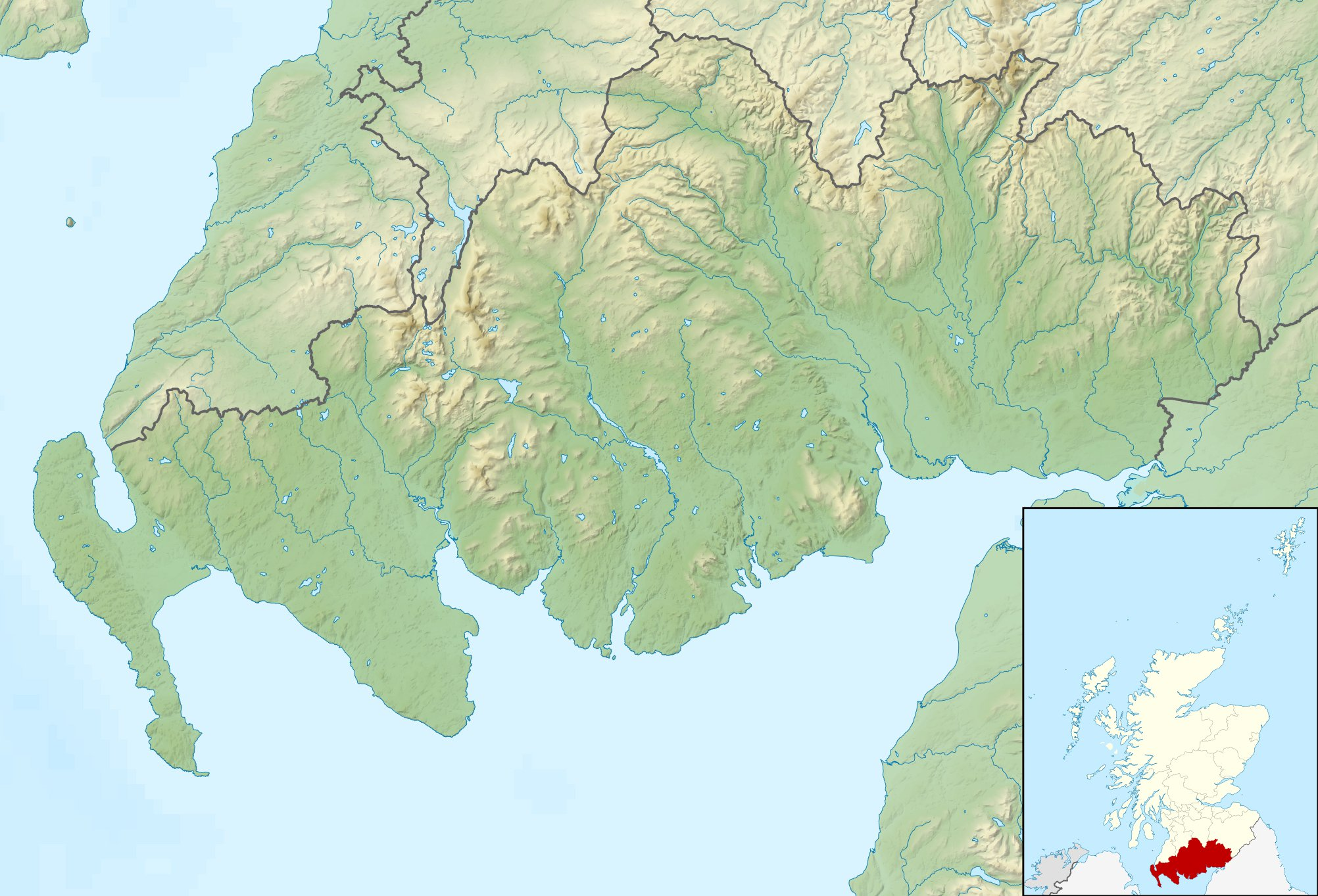
- Location within Dumfries and Galloway
- Location: Dumfries and Galloway, Scotland
- Coordinates: 55.1197899362°N 3.432154527°W
- Type: freshwater loch
- Primary inflows: several small burns
- Primary outflows: Castle Loch burn
- Basin countries: Scotland

Ramsar Wetland
- Official name: Castle Loch, Lochmaben
- Designated: 15 March 1996
- Reference no.: 796

Castle Loch is a shallow eutrophic loch covering an area of around 100 hectares in the town of Lochmaben in Dumfries and Galloway, Scotland. The ruined Lochmaben Castle lies at the southern end of the loch.

== Wildlife and conservation ==
Castle Loch is an important over-wintering location for the pink-footed goose and the goosander. It has been recognised as a wetland of international importance under the Ramsar Convention, and has been designated a Site of Special Scientific Interest.
