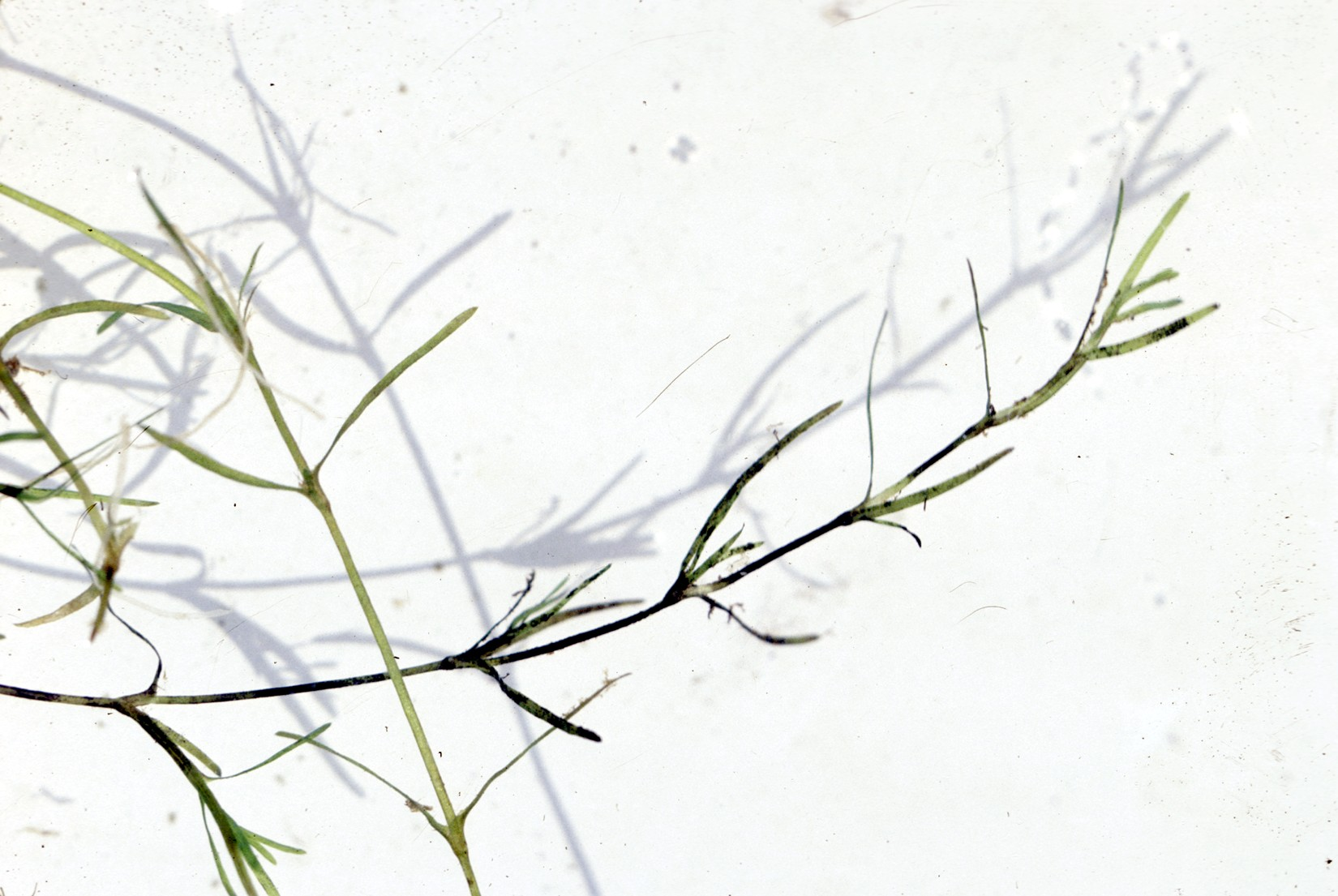

Conservation status
- Least Concern (IUCN 3.1)

Scientific classification
- Kingdom: Plantae
- Clade: Tracheophytes
- Clade: Angiosperms
- Clade: Monocots
- Order: Alismatales
- Family: Hydrocharitaceae
- Genus: Najas
- Species: N. flexilis

Binomial name
- Najas flexilis (Willd.) Rostk. & Schmidt

Synonyms
- Caulinia flexilis Willd.

= Najas flexilis =

Species of aquatic plant

Najas flexilis is an aquatic annual plant native to parts of North America and Europe. It is native to northern and central Europe from Norway to Ireland to Switzerland, and from there across Russia (including Siberia). It is also considered native throughout most of Canada, and the northern United States in disjunct populations in southern California, Arizona, Missouri, South Carolina and Utah. Its common names include slender naiad and nodding waternymph.

Najas flexilis inhabits shallow bodies of brackish and fresh water such as lakes and bays. It is also native to northern Europe, where its range includes Scotland, Poland and Sweden. It is rare in the European portion of its range and is strictly protected by Appendix I of the Berne Convention. The largest population is in Lake Sīveri in Latvia.
