= Gruinart Flats =

Low-lying landform on the western part of the isle of Islay in Scotland

Coordinates: 55°49′5″N 6°19′55″W

Designations

Ramsar Wetland
- Official name: Gruinart Flats, Islay
- Designated: 14 July 1988
- Reference no.: 401

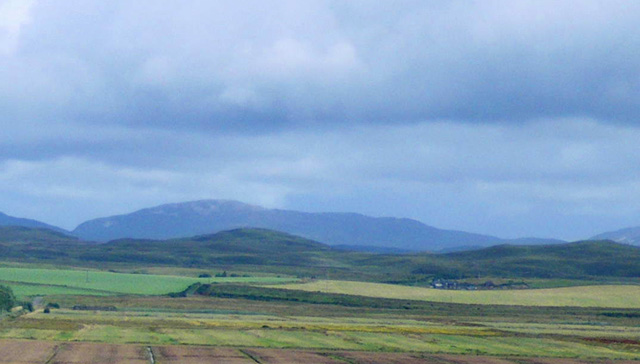
Southern edge of Gruinart Flats.

The Gruinart Flats is a low-lying landform on the western part of the isle of Islay in Scotland. The locale is an important conservation area, having been designated as an SSSI. Much of the Gruinart Flats is a marshy area operated by the Royal Society for the Protection of Birds. This vicinity is known to be an early habitation site by Mesolithic peoples.

== See also ==
- Loch Gruinart
