= Special Protection Area =

Type of protected areas in the European Union defined by the Birds Directive

A Special Protection Area (SPA) is a designation under the European Union Directive on the Conservation of Wild Birds. Under the Directive, Member States of the European Union (EU) have a duty to safeguard the habitats of migratory birds and certain particularly threatened birds. Together with Special Areas of Conservation (SACs), the SPAs form a network of protected sites across the EU, called Natura 2000. Each SPA has an EU code – for example the North Norfolk Coast SPA has the code UK9009031.

== In the United Kingdom ==
As of 21 September 2006, there were 252 classified SPAs and 12 proposed SPAs in England, Scotland, Wales and Northern Ireland.

Conservation (Natural Habitats, &c.) Regulations 1994
- Statutory Instrument
- Parliament of the United Kingdom
- Citation: SI 1994/2716

Dates
- Made: 20 October 1994
- Commencement: 30 October 1994

Other legislation
- Made under: European Communities Act 1972
- Transposes: Council Directive 92/43/EEC

Text of statute as originally enacted

Text of the Conservation (Natural Habitats, &c.) Regulations 1994 as in force today (including any amendments) within the United Kingdom, from legislation.gov.uk.

The Conservation (Natural Habitats, &c.) Regulations 1994 (SI 1994/2716) implement the terms of the Directive in Scotland, England and Wales. In Great Britain, SPAs (and SACs) designated on land or in the intertidal area are normally also notified as Sites of Special Scientific Interest (SSSIs), and in Northern Ireland as Areas of Special Scientific Interest (ASSIs). For example, the Broadland SPA in eastern England is a conglomeration of some 28 SSSIs. SPAs may extend below low tide into the sea, and for these areas SSSI notification is not possible. In Scotland, some SPAs have been classified without any underpinning designation by SSSI.

== In Poland ==
Special Protection Areas for Birds in Poland are called OSOPs (Polish: Obszar Specjalnej Ochrony Ptaków). As of 2005, there were 72 OSOP Areas designated as such.

== In the Netherlands ==
In the Netherlands, Special Protection Areas for birds are called Vogelrichtlijngebied.

== In Portugal ==
The Castro Verde SPA extends into six municipalities of Baixo Alentejo Subregion: Aljustrel, Almodôvar Municipality, Beja Municipality, Castro Verde Municipality, Mértola and Ourique Municipality, a total area of 79,007 hectares (790 km ^{2}).

== In Spain ==
The Spanish term is ZEPA. There were 658 Spanish sites as at 2021.

== In the Czech Republic ==
The Czech Republic uses the term Ptačí oblast (PO, bird area) for SPAs. Between 2004 and 2009, 41 bird areas were declared by government directives. They cover 9% of the state area.

== See also ==
- Area of Special Protection (UK designation unrelated to Special Protection Area)
- Convention on the Conservation of European Wildlife and Natural Habitats
- List of conservation topics
- List of Special Protection Areas in the United Kingdom
- Protected areas of the United Kingdom
- Ramsar Convention
- Specially Protected Areas of Mediterranean Importance
- UK sites recognised for their biodiversity conservation importance
