= List of Sites of Special Scientific Interest in Skye and Lochalsh =

The following is a list of Sites of Special Scientific Interest in the Skye and Lochalsh Area of Search. For other areas, see List of SSSIs by Area of Search.

- Affric Cannich Hills
- Aird Thuirinis - Port na Long
- Airdghunail
- Allt Cracaig Coast
- Allt Geodh A Ghamna
- Allt Grillan Gorge
- An Cleireach
- Ard Hill
- Avernish
- Bagh Tharsgabhaig
- Beinn A Chapuill
- Boirearaig-Carn Dearg
- Carn A Bhealaich Mhoir
- Ceann Loch Eishort
- Coille Dalavil
- Coille Mhialairidh
- Coille Mhor
- Coille Thogabhaig
- Cosag Sallow Carr
- Cuillins
- Druim Iosal
- Eilean Chlamail - Camas nan Ceann
- Elgol Coast
- Eyre Point
- Geary Ravine
- Glen Barisdale
- Hangmans Bridge
- Kinloch and Kyleakin Hills (Monadh Chaol Acainn is Cheann Loch)
- Loch Alsh
- Loch Ashaig
- Loch Cleat
- Loch Meodal
- Meall A Mhaoil
- Mointeach nan Lochain Dubha
- Ob Lusa - Ard Nis Coast
- Raasay
- Rigg-Bile
- Roineval
- Rubh an Eireannaich
- Rubha Camas na Cailinn
- Rubha Hunish
- Sligachan
- Strath
- Talisker
- Trotternish Ridge (Storr to Quirang)
- Valtos
