= List of Sites of Special Scientific Interest in West Perth =

The following is a list of Sites of Special Scientific Interest in the West Perth Area of Search. For other areas, see List of SSSIs by Area of Search.

- Aldclune and Invervack Meadows
- Almondbank
- Balnaguard Glen
- Beinn A' Chuallaich
- Ben Alder And Aonach Beag
- Ben Chonzie
- Ben Heasgarnich
- Ben Lawers
- Birks of Aberfeldy
- Black Wood of Rannoch
- Bolfracks Wood
- Cambusurich Wood
- Carie and Cragganester Woods
- Carn Gorm and Meall Garbh
- Coille Chriche
- Coire Bhachdaidh
- Comrie Woods
- Connachan Marsh
- Craig More
- Creag Kinaldy
- Croftintygan Meadow
- Dalcroy Promontory
- Drummond Lochs
- Drumochter Hills
- Dunalastair Reservoir
- Edinample Meadow
- Fearnan Cowpark
- Fintulich
- Glen Lyon Woods
- Glenartney Juniper Wood
- Keltneyburn
- Linn of Tummel
- Little Glenshee
- Loch Con
- Loch Freuchie Meadows
- Loch Tay Marshes
- Loch Tummel Flush
- Logierait Mires
- Meall Dail-Chealach
- Meall Ghaordie
- Meall Reamhar
- Meggernie and Croch na Keys Woods
- Methven Woods
- Mill Dam
- Monzie Wood
- Morenish Meadow
- Pass of Killiecrankie
- Rannoch Lochs
- Rannoch Moor
- River Lyon Bank
- Schiehallion
- Shingle Islands
- Shochie Burn
- Struan Wood
- Tomnadashan Mine
- Tulach Hill
- Weem Meadow
