= List of Sites of Special Scientific Interest in Stirling =

The following is a list of Sites of Special Scientific Interest in the Stirling Area of Search. For other areas, see List of SSSIs by Area of Search.

- Abbey Craig
- Arnprior Glen
- Aucheneck
- Balglass Corries
- Ballagan Glen
- Ballanucater
- Balquhidderock Wood
- Ben An and Brenachoile Woods
- Ben Heasgarnich
- Ben Lawers
- Ben Lomond
- Ben Lui
- Ben More - Stob Binnein
- Blackwater Marshes
- Blane, Drumore and Station Woods de-notified (confirmed) on 2 June 2011
- Brig O'Turk Mires
- Cambusurich Wood
- Carbeth Loch
- Coille Chriche
- Coille Coire Chuilc
- Collymoon Moss
- Conic Hill
- Craigallian Marshes
- Craigrostan Woods
- Crom Allt de-notified (confirmed) on 2 June 2011
- Cuilvona And Craigmore Woods
- Dalveich Meadow
- Double Craigs
- Drumore Wood
- Dumbroch Loch Meadows
- Edinample Meadow
- Edinchip Wood
- Endrick Mouth and Islands
- Endrick Water
- Fairy Knowe And Doon Hill
- Falls of Dochart
- Finlarig Burn
- Firth of Forth
- Flanders Moss
- Garabal Hill
- Gartfarran Woods
- Glen Falloch Pinewood
- Glen Falloch Woods
- Glen Lochay Woods
- Inchcruin
- Inchmoan
- Innishewan Wood
- Killorn Moss
- Kippenrait Glen
- Lake of Menteith
- Leny Quarry
- Lime Craig Quarry
- Lime Hill
- Loch Lubnaig Marshes
- Loch Macanrie Fens
- Loch Mahaick
- Loch Tay Marshes
- Loch Watston
- Lochan Lairig Cheile
- Meall Ghaordie
- Meall na Samhna
- Mollands
- Mugdock Wood
- Ochtertyre Moss
- Offerance Moss
- Pass of Leny Flushes
- Pollochro Woods
- Quoigs Meadow
- River Dochart Meadows
- Rowardennan Woodlands
- Sauchie Craig Wood
- Shirgarton Moss
- Stronvar Marshes
- Tynaspirit
- Wester Balgair Meadow
- Wester Moss
- Westerton Water Meadow
- Wolf's Hole Quarry
