= List of Sites of Special Scientific Interest in East Perth =

The following is a list of Sites of Special Scientific Interest in the East Perth Area of Search, in Scotland. For other areas, see List of SSSIs by Area of Search.

- Aldclune and Invervack Meadows
- Ardblair and Myreside Fens
- Ballyoukan Juniper Wood
- Beinn a' Ghlò
- Ben Vrackie
- Blair Atholl Meadow
- Brerachan Meadows
- Caenlochan
- Cairnleith Moss
- Cairnwell
- Cardney Wood
- Craig Tronach
- Craighall Gorge
- Craigs of Lundie and Ardgarth Loch
- Den of Airlie
- Den of Alyth
- Den of Riechip
- Drumochter Hills
- Drumore Loch
- Dun Moss
- Forest of Alyth Mires
- Forest of Clunie
- Fungarth Juniper Wood
- Glas Tulaichean
- Glen Fender Meadows
- Glen Garry
- Glen Tilt Woods
- Hare Myre Monk Myre and Stormont Loch
- Inchcoonans Claypit
- Inner Tay Estuary
- Kings Myre
- Kinnoull Hill
- Lairds Loch
- Loch Moraig
- Lochs Clunie and Marlee
- Lochs of Butterstone, Craiglush, Lowes
- Meikleour Area
- Milton Wood
- Pitarrig Meadow
- Pitlowie
- Romadie Wood
- Straloch Moraines
- Struan Wood
- Tay Bank Section
- Thistle Brig
- Tulach Hill
- Gallowflat Claypit De-notified on 24 August 2012
