= List of Sites of Special Scientific Interest in Dumbarton and North Glasgow =

The following is a list of Sites of Special Scientific Interest in the Dumbarton and North Glasgow Area of Search. For other areas, see List of SSSIs by Area of Search.

- Aber Bog, Gartocharn Bog and Bell Moss
- Auchenreoch Glen
- Auchensail Quarry
- Balglass Corries
- Ben Vorlich
- Bishop Loch
- Blairbeich Bog
- Boturich Woodlands
- Cadder Wilderness
- Caldarvan Loch
- Cart and Kittoch Valleys
- Corrie Burn
- Dullatur Marsh
- Dumbarton Muir
- Dumbarton Rock
- Endrick Mouth and Islands
- Endrick Water
- Fossil Grove
- Garabal Hill
- Geal and Dubh Lochs
- Geilston Burn
- Glen Loin
- Glenarbuck
- Hawcraigs, Glenarbuck
- Inchlonaig
- Inchmoan
- Inchmurrin
- Inchtavannach and Inchconnachan
- Inner Clyde
- Lang Craigs
- Loch Humphrey Burn
- Manse Burn
- Mollinsburn Road Cutting
- Mugdock Wood
- Pollochro Woods
- Portnellan - Ross Priory - Claddochside
- Possil Marsh
- Rhu Point
- Ross Park
- Ross Park - Lochshore Woodland
- Sculliongour Limestone Quarry
- Slamannan Plateau
- South Braes
- Waulkmill Glen
- West Fannyside Moss
- West Loch Lomondside Woodlands
