= List of Sites of Special Scientific Interest in Wigtown and Stewartry =

The following is a list of Sites of Special Scientific Interest in the Wigtown and Stewartry Area of Search. For other areas, see List of SSSIs by Area of Search.

- Abbey Burn Foot to Balcary Point
- Airds of Kells Wood
- Ardwall Hill
- Auchencairn and Orchardton Bays
- Auchrochar Wetlands
- Back Bay to Carghidown
- Bailliewhirr
- Blood Moss
- Borgue Coast
- Burrow Head
- Cairnbaber
- Cairnsmore of Fleet
- Carrick Ponds
- Carsegowan Moss
- Carstramon Wood
- Clatteringshaws Dam Quarry
- Cleugh
- Corsewall Point - Milleur Point
- Cotland Plantation
- Cree Estuary
- Cruggleton Bay
- Derskelpin Moss
- Dowalton Loch
- Ellergower Moss
- Flow of Dergoals
- Glen App and Galloway Moors
- Glentrool Oakwoods
- Grennan Bay
- Hannaston Wood
- Heart Moss
- Isle of Whithorn Bay
- Kenmure Holms
- Kilhern Moss
- Killiegowan Wood
- Kirkcowan Flow
- Lagganmullan
- Laughenghie and Airie Hills
- Lea Larks
- Loch Doon
- Lower River Cree
- Merrick Kells
- Milton Loch
- Mochrum Lochs
- Morroch Bay
- Mull of Galloway
- Newlaw Moss
- Pibble Mine De-notified (confirmed) on 17 November 2011
- Port Logan
- Port O'Warren
- Ravenshall Wood
- Ring Moss
- River Dee (Parton to Crossmichael)
- Salt Pans Bay
- Scare Rocks
- Shoulder O'Craig
- Skyreburn Grasslands
- Talnotry Mine
- Threave and Carlingwark Loch
- Torrs Moss
- Torrs to Mason's Walk
- Torrs Warren - Luce Sands
- Upper Solway Flats and Marshes
- Water of Ken Woods
- West Burrow Head
- White Loch - Lochinch
- Wood of Cree
- Woodhall Loch
