= List of Sites of Special Scientific Interest in Angus and Dundee =

SSSIs in Angus & Dundee

The following is a list of Sites of Special Scientific Interest in the Angus and Dundee Area of Search. For other areas, see List of SSSIs by Area of Search.

- Auchterhouse Hill
- Balloch Moss
- Balshando Bog
- Barry Links (Note: Barry Links is a SSSI and a SAC (Special Area of Conservation).)
- Blacklaw Hill Mire
- Caenlochan
- Carrot Hill Meadow
- Craigs of Lundie and Ardgarth Loch
- Crossbog Pinewood
- Den of Airlie (Note: The Den of Airlie SSSI overlaps Angus and Perth and Kinross. The former is the primary local authority for its administration.)
- Den of Fowlis
- Den of Ogil
- Dilty Moss
- Dryleys Brick Pit
- Dun's Dish
- Easthaven
- Elliot Links
- Fafernie (Note: Fafernie Cairn is situated on the boundary of Angus and Aberdeenshire. Nature Scot places Fafernie SSSI in Aberdeenshire for administrative purposes, so its location in this list is questionable.)
- Forest Muir
- Gagie Marsh
- Gannochy Gorge
- Inner Tay Estuary
- Little Ballo (Note: Little Ballo SSSI is described by Nature Scot as overlapping Perth and Kinross, and Angus. But Perth and Kinross is designated the primary local authority for administrative purposes.)
- Loch Brandy
- Loch of Kinnordy
- Loch of Lintrathen
- Lochindores (Note: Lochindores SSSI crosses the boundary of Angus and of Perth and Kinross. Nature Scot defines Perth and Kinross as the primary local authority for administrative purposes.)
- Long Loch of Lundie
- Monifieth Bay
- Montrose Basin
- North Esk and West Water Palaeochannels
- Red Craig
- Rescobie and Balgavies Lochs
- Restenneth Moss
- Rickle Craig - Scurdie Ness
- Rossie Moor
- Round Loch of Lundie
- St Cyrus and Kinnaber Links (Note: St Cyrus and Kinnaber Links SSSI is indicated by Nature Scot as overlapping Aberdeenshire and Angus. Aberdeenshire is designated the primary local authority for administrative purposes.)
- Turin Hill
- Whitehouse Den
- Whiting Ness - Ethie Haven Coast (Note: Whiting Ness - Ethie Haven SSSI is located on a section of the coast of Angus, hence the description of it as Coast in the link.)
