= List of Sites of Special Scientific Interest in Falkirk and Clackmannan =

The following is a list of Sites of Special Scientific Interest in the Falkirk and Clackmannan Area of Search. For other areas, see List of SSSIs by Area of Search.

- Avon Gorge
- Back Burn Wood and Meadows
- Blawhorn Moss
- Bo'Mains Meadow
- Carriber Glen
- Carron Dams
- Carron Glen
- Craig Leith and Myreton Hill
- Craigmad Wood
- Damhead Wood
- Darnrig Moss
- Denny Muir
- Devon Gorge
- Dollar Glen
- Firth of Forth
- Gartmorn Dam
- Howierig Muir
- Linn Mill
- Mill Glen
- Slamannan Plateau
