= Wether Hill =

Wether Hill may refer to:

- Wether Hill (Dumfries and Galloway), an onshore wind farms in the United Kingdom, Scotland
- Wether Hill (Lake District), near Penrith, England
- Wether Hill (Ochil Hills), a 535 m summit in the Ochil Hills near Perth, Scotland
- Wether Hill (SSSI South Perth), a site of special scientific interest in South Perth, Scotlandπ
