= List of Sites of Special Scientific Interest in East Ross and Cromarty =

The following is a list of Sites of Special Scientific Interest in the East Ross and Cromarty, Scotland, Area of Search. For other areas, see List of SSSIs by Area of Search.

- Achanalt Marshes
- Achnasheen Terraces
- Allt nan Caorach
- Alness River Valley
- Beauly Firth
- Beinn Dearg
- Ben Wyvis
- Black Park Edderton
- Black Rock Gorge
- Braelangwell Wood
- Calrossie
- Càrn Gorm
- Craigroy Burn
- Cromarty Firth
- Dam Wood
- Dornoch Firth
- Drummondreach Wood
- Easter Fearn
- Fannich Hills
- Kinrive-Strathrory
- Loch Achnacloich
- Loch Eye
- Loch Ussie
- Lower River Conon
- Monadh Mòr
- Monar Forest
- Morrich More
- Munlochy Bay
- Pitmaduthy Moss
- Rosemarkie to Shandwick Coast
- Roskill
- Struie Channels
- Talich
- Tarbat Ness
- The Dens
