= List of Sites of Special Scientific Interest in Renfrew and Cunninghame =

The following Sites of Special Scientific Interest are located in the Renfrew and Cunninghame Area of Search. For other areas, see List of SSSIs by Area of Search.

- Àrd Bheinn
- Ardrossan to Saltcoats Coast
- Arran Moors
- Arran Northern Mountains
- Ashgrove Loch
- Ballochmartin Bay
- Bankhead Moss, Beith
- Barmufflock Dam
- Benlister Glen
- Black Cart SSSI
- Bogside Flats
- Boylestone Quarry
- Brother and Little Lochs
- Cart and Kittoch Valleys
- Castle Semple and Barr Lochs
- Clauchlands Point - Corrygills
- Clochodrick Stone
- Cockinhead Moss
- Corrie Foreshore and Limestone Mines
- Dargavel Burn
- Dippin Head
- Drumadoon-Tormore
- Dundonald Burn
- Dunrod Hill
- Dykeneuk Moss
- Formakin
- Gleann Dubh
- Glen Moss SSSI
- High Smithstone Quarry De-notified (confirmed) on 16 April 2012
- Inner Clyde
- Kames Bay
- Knocknairs Hill
- Laggan SSSI
- Largs Coast Section
- Loch Libo
- Lynn Spout
- Muirkirk Uplands
- North Newton Shore
- Portencross Coast
- Renfrewshire Heights
- Rouken Glen
- Shielhill Glen
- Shovelboard
- Skelmorlie Glen
- South Coast of Arran
- Trearne Quarry
- Waulkmill Glen
- Western Gailes
