= List of Sites of Special Scientific Interest in Nithsdale =

SSSIs in Nithsdale

The following is a list of Sites of Special Scientific Interest in the Nithsdale Area of Search. Nithsdale is a sub-area of Dumfriesshire County within the Dumfries and Galloway unitary council area of Scotland. These SSSIs can be found by searching within the SiteLink website maintained by NatureScot/NàdarAlba. For other areas, see List of SSSIs by Area of Search.

- Back Wood
- Black Loch
- Carron Water and Hapland Burn
- Chanlockfoot
- Coshogle Wood
- Kirkconnell Flow
- Lag Meadow
- Lagrae Burn
- Leadhills-Wanlockhead (Note: Leadhills-Wanlockhead SSSI is near the villages of Leadhills and Wanlockhead but they are not part of it.)
- Locharbriggs Quarry (Note: Locharbriggs Quarry SSSI encloses only part of the quarry workings near the town of Locharbriggs.)
- Longbridge Muir
- Mennock Water
- North Lowther Uplands
- Polhote and Polneul Burns
- Shiel Dod
- Stenhouse Wood
- Tynron Juniper Wood
- Upper Solway Flats and Marshes (Note: The Solway Flats and Marshes SSSI forms part of the boundary of the Solway Firth between England and Scotland, on the Scottish side.)
