= Bilston, Midlothian =

Coordinates: 55.869°N 3.179°W

Bilston
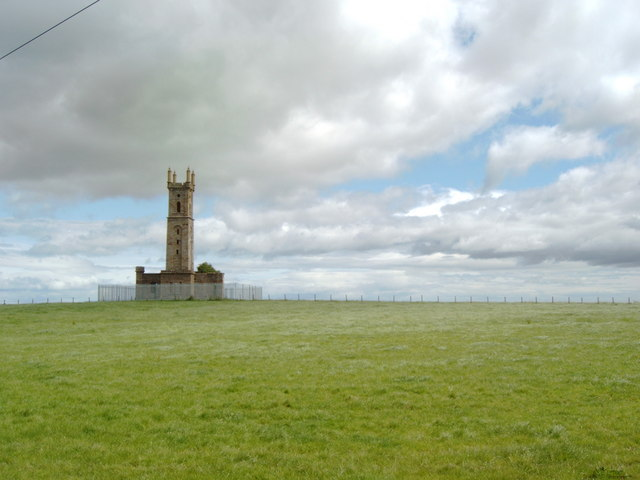
- Dryden Tower, a 19th-century Gothic folly overlooking Bilston

- Location within Midlothian
- Population: 1,440 (2020)
- OS grid reference: NT262646
- Council area: Midlothian
- Lieutenancy area: Midlothian
- Country: Scotland
- Sovereign state: United Kingdom
- Post town: ROSLIN
- Postcode district: EH25
- Dialling code: 0131
- Police: Scotland
- Fire: Scottish
- Ambulance: Scottish
- UK Parliament: Midlothian
- Scottish Parliament: Midlothian North and Musselburgh

Bilston is a small village in Midlothian, Scotland. It is located on the edge of Edinburgh, just south of Loanhead on the A701. The Bilston Burn Site of Special Scientific Interest (SSSI) was occupied from 2002 until the mid-2010s by protestors who successfully opposed plans for a bypass.

== History ==
Bilston is a village which was set up to service the local coal-mining industry. The Bilston Glen Colliery produced coal until its closure in 1989. It is located next to woodland and the Bilston Glen industrial estate. The village is overlooked by a tower which used be part of the Dryden House, which was set on a hill overlooking the River Forth. Bilston Burn is a tributary of the River North Esk. It flows east from the village, and the woods it runs through are classified as a Site of Special Scientific Interest (SSSI). John Comyn stayed in the woods with his troops before the Battle of Roslin in 1303.

Bilston has a primary school, Bilston Primary. Police Scotland run a control room at Bilston Glen and during the COVID-19 pandemic in Scotland set up a coronavirus control centre there.

== Bypass and camp ==
A proposed bypass, taking the A701 east of the village from Straiton to Milton Bridge outside Penicuik, was put forward by Midlothian Council in 2000. It was included in the local development plan. One of the proposed routes of the bypass was through the SSSI woodland at Bilston Glen. Despite objections from local people and conservationists who submitted 700 objections, Midlothian Council and the Scottish Executive approved the route. It was challenged legally but the Scottish transport minister Sarah Boyack declined to open an inquiry about the £18.5 million scheme.

In response, Bilston Glen was occupied in 2002 in order to prevent the SSSI being destroyed. Ten years later, the camp was still there, with protestors careful not to build any permanent structures which would damage the woodland. It became known as one of the longest-running tree protection sites in the world.

The 2015 local development plan proposed building more houses in Bilston and turning the current A701 road into a route for public transport, cyclists and walkers, as part of the revised "Midlothian Gateway" plan.

== See also ==
- List of Sites of Special Scientific Interest in Mid and East Lothian
