= List of Sites of Special Scientific Interest in North East Fife =

The following is a list of Sites of Special Scientific Interest in the North East Fife Area of Search, in Scotland. For other areas, see List of SSSIs by Area of Search.

- Ballo and Harperleas Reservoirs
- Balmerino - Wormit Shore
- Bankhead Moss
- Barnsmuir Coast
- Black Loch (Abdie)
- Cameron Reservoir
- Cassindonald Moss
- Craighall Den
- Craigmead Meadows
- Dunbog Bog
- Earlshall Muir
- Eden Estuary
- Fife Ness Coast
- Firth of Forth
- Fleecefaulds Meadow
- Flisk Wood
- Inner Tay Estuary
- Isle of May
- Kilconquhar Loch
- Lacesston Muir and Glen Burn Gorge
- Lady Loch
- Lindores Loch
- Lochmill Loch
- Morton Lochs
- North Fife Heaths
- Pickletillem Marsh
- St Andrews - Craig Hartle
- St Michaels Wood Marshes
- Swinky Muir
- Tayport-Tentsmuir Coast
- Torflundie Mire
- Turflundie Wood
- Waltonhill and Cradle Den
