= Red Point =

Red Point may refer to:

== Places ==
Australia

- Red Point, Port Kembla, New South Wales; a headland
- Red Point, Twofold Bay, New South Wales; a headland

Canada

- Red Point (Nova Scotia); a headland on Cape Breton
- Red Point Provincial Park, Prince Edward Island

Mozambique

- Red Point Palace; see Flag of Mozambique

United Kingdom

- Redpoint, Highland, Scottish settlement
- Red Point Coast, Caithness, Scotland; see List of Sites of Special Scientific Interest in Caithness

United States

- Red Point, Maryland; an unincorporated community
- Red Point Township, Texas County, Okhlahoma; see List of Oklahoma townships
- Red Point, Custer County, South Dakota; a mountain, see List of mountains in South Dakota
- Red Point Reservoir, Emery County, Utah

== Arts, entertainment, media ==
- Red Point (EP), the seventh EP by Teen Top
- Lal Tip: The Red Point, a 2012 film
- The Beach at Redpoint, track from the 2002 album Geogaddi by Boards of Canada

== Other ==
- Redpoint (climbing)
- Redpoint Ventures, a venture capital and investment firm
- Redpoints, the frequent flyer programme of LTU International

== See also ==
- Honduran red point, a fish
- Point (disambiguation)
- Red (disambiguation)
