= List of Sites of Special Scientific Interest in Kincardine and Deeside =

The following is a list of Sites of Special Scientific Interest in the Kincardine and Deeside Area of Search. For other areas, see List of SSSIs by Area of Search.

- Burn of Benholm
- Caenlochan
- Cairngorms
- Cairnwell
- Coyles of Muick
- Craig Leek
- Craigendarroch
- Crathie Wood
- Crawton Bay
- Creag Clunie and the Lion's Face
- Dalnabo Quarry
- Den of Finella
- Dinnet Oakwood
- Eastern Cairngorms
- Eslie Moss
- Fafernie
- Findon Moor
- Fowlsheugh
- Gannochy Gorge
- Garbh Choire
- Garron Point
- Glen Callater
- Glen Ey Gorge
- Glen Tanar
- Inchrory
- Loch of Aboyne
- Loch of Lumgair
- Loch of Park
- Milton Ness
- Morrone Birkwood
- Morven and Mullachdubh
- Muir of Dinnet
- North Esk and West Water Palaeochannels
- Northern Corries, Cairngorms
- Old Wood of Drum
- Pollagach Burn
- Potarch
- Quithel Wood
- Red Moss of Netherley
- Shannel
- St Cyrus and Kinnaber Links
- West Bradieston and Craig of Garvock
