= List of Sites of Special Scientific Interest in Badenoch and Strathspey =

The following is a list of Sites of Special Scientific Interest (SSSIs) in the Badenoch and Strathspey Area of Search. For other areas, see List of SSSIs by Area of Search.

- Abernethy Forest
- Allt Mor
- Allt na Feithe Sheilich
- Alvie
- Ben Alder And Aonach Beag (Note: Ben Alder and Aonach Beag SSSI is also Ben Alder and Aonach Beag Special Area of Conservation (SAC) for the habitats present. Part of Ben Alder and Aonach Beag SSSI is also Ben Alder Special Protection Area (SPA) due to the presence of the dotterel.)
- Cairngorms (Note: The Cairngorms SSSI is part of the Cairgorms SAC due to the habitats and species (green shield-moss, otter) present. The Cairngorms SSSI is also part of the Cairngorms SPA for the bird species present. Part of Cairngorms SSSI is part of River Spey SAC due to the species present. Part of Cairngorms SSSI is part of River Dee SAC due to the species present.)
- Craigellachie (Note: Part of Craigellachie SSSI is designated a National Nature Reserve. All of Craigellachie SSSI lies within the Cairngorms National Park.)
- Creag Dhubh (Note: Part of Creag Dhubh SSSI is part of River Spey SAC due to the species present.)
- Creag Meagaidh
- Drumochter Hills (Note: Much of Drumochter Hills SSSI is also designated Drumochter Hills SAC due to the habitats present. Part of the River Spey SAC runs through the middle of Drumochter Hills SSSI. Most of Drumochter Hills SSSI is designated Drumochter Hills SPA due to the bird species (dotterel, merlin).)
- Glenmore Forest
- Kinlochlaggan Boulder Beds
- Kinveachy Forest (Note: Park of Kinveachy Forest SSSI is designated Kinveachy Forest SAC due to the habitats and species present. Part of Kinveachy Forest SSSI is designated Kinveachy Forest SPA for the bird species present (capercaillie, scottish crossbill). Part of the River Spey SAC runs through Kinveachy Forest SSSI.)
- Loch Etteridge
- Loch Vaa (Note: Loch Vaa SSSI is also Loch Vaa SPA due to the presence of the slavonian grebe.)
- Moidach More (Note: Moidach More SSSI is also designated Moidach More SAC due to the presence of blanket bog.) (Note: Moidach More SSSI is also listed on List of Sites of Special Scientific Interest in Moray and Nairn.)
- Monadhliath
- North Rothiemurchus Pinewood (Note: North Rothiemurchus Pinewood SSSI is part of the Cairngorms SAC due to the habitats and species present. North Rothiemurchus Pinewood SSSI is part of the Cairngorms SPA due to the bird species present. Part of the North Rothiemurchus Pinewood SSSI overlaps with the River Spey SAC due to the species present.)
- Northern Corries, Cairngorms (Note: Northern Corries, Cairngorms SSSI is part of the Cairngorms SAC due to the habitats and species present. Northern Corries, Cairngorms SSSI is part of the Cairngorms SPA due to the bird species present.)
- Parallel Roads of Lochaber
- River Feshie (Note: Parts of River Feshie SSSI overlap with Cairngorms SSSI and River Spey - Insh Marshes SSSI. Parts of River Feshie SSSI overlap with Cairgorms SAC, River Spey SAC and Insh Marshes SAC. Parts of River Feshie SSSI overlap with Cairngorms SPA and River Spey - Insh Marshes SPA. For more details see SSSI citation referenced here.)
- River Spey (Note: Parts of the River Spey SSSI overlaps with the Parallel Roads of Lochaber SSSI, the Lower River Spey SSSI, the Alvie SSSI and the Spey Bay SSSI. The River Spey SSSI overlaps with two SACs: the River Spey SAC and the Lower Spey - Spey Bay SAC, due to the habitats and species present. Part of the River Spey SSSI overlaps with the Moray and Nairn Coast SPA due to the bird species present. This is located in the Moray and Nairn area of search and is included here because of the course of the River Spey.)
- River Spey Insh Marshes (Note: River Spey - Insh Marshes SSSI overlaps with River Feshie SSSI. River Spey - Insh Marshes SSSI is also designated Insh Marshes SAC due to the habitats and species present. River Spey - Insh Marshes SSSI is also part of River Spey SAC due to the species present. River Spey - Insh Marshes SSSI is also River Spey - Insh Marshes SPA due to the bird species present.)
