= List of Sites of Special Scientific Interest in Clydesdale and South East Glasgow =

The following is a list of Sites of Special Scientific Interest (SSSIs) in the Clydesdale and South East Glasgow Area of Search. For other areas, see List of SSSIs by Area of Search.

- Avondale
- Birk Knowes
- Birkenhead Burn
- Black Loch Moss
- Blantyre Muir
- Bothwell Castle Grounds
- Braehead Moss
- Calder Glen
- Cander Moss
- Carnwath Moss
- Carstairs Kames
- Cart and Kittoch Valleys
- Cartland Craigs
- Cleghorn Glen
- Coalburn Moss
- Cobbinshaw Moss
- Cobbinshaw Reservoir
- Craigengar
- Craighead Hill Quarry
- Cranley Moss
- Dolphinton - West Linton Fens and Grassland
- Dunside
- Falls of Clyde
- Fiddlers Gill
- Garrion Gill
- Gillsburn and Mare Gill
- Hamilton High Parks
- Hamilton Low Parks
- Hassockrigg and North Shotts Mosses
- Jock's Gill Wood
- Kennox Water
- Lady Bells Moss
- Leadhills-Wanlockhead
- Longriggend Moss
- Millburn
- Millers Wood
- Milton Lockhart Wood
- Muirkirk Uplands
- Nethan Gorge
- North Bellstane Plantation
- North Lowther Uplands
- Raven Gill
- Red Moss
- Ree Burn and Glenbuck Loch
- River Clyde Meanders
- Shiel Burn
- Shiel Dod
- Slamannan Plateau
- Tinto Hills
- Townhead Burn
- Upper Nethan Valley Woods
- Waukenwae Moss
- Woodend Loch
