= List of Sites of Special Scientific Interest by Area of Search =

Sites of Special Scientific Interest (SSSIs) in the United Kingdom are areas of conservation, consisting of protected areas, recognised for their biological or geological significance. In Northern Ireland an SSSI is called an area of special scientific interest (ASSI).

An Area of Search (AOS) is a geographical area used in the selection of these sites. In England these are largely based on the 1974–1996 administrative counties (with larger counties divided into two or more areas). In Scotland they are largely based around the 1975 - 1996 districts, whereas in Wales they are based on districts (the second-tier administrative divisions which functioned between 1974 and 1996) or counties. The individual AOSs are between 400 km^{2} and 4,000 km^{2} in size. There are 59 AOSs in England, 12 in Wales, and 44 in Scotland.

Until the 2010s, Natural England, which maintains the database of English SSSIs, kept the listing of counties as it was in 1974, but by 2015 they had updated their lists to reflect some later changes. However, two counties abolished in 1996 are still used as areas of search by Natural England: Avon (which is now divided between Somerset, Gloucestershire and Bristol) and Cleveland (which is now divided into County Durham and North Yorkshire).

== England ==
Area of Search ^{[A]}	Number of sites				Sites list
Area of Search ^{[A]}	Biological	Geological	Both	Total	Sites list
Avon	38	39	9	86	List of SSSIs in Avon
Bedfordshire	35	5	0	40	List of SSSIs in Bedfordshire
Berkshire	63	8	0	71	List of SSSIs in Berkshire
Buckinghamshire	55	10	0	65	List of SSSIs in Buckinghamshire
Cambridgeshire	90	10	1	101	List of SSSIs in Cambridgeshire
Cheshire	51	7	5	63	List of SSSIs in Cheshire
Cleveland	12	4	2	18	List of SSSIs in Cleveland
Cornwall	81	54	32	167	List of SSSIs in Cornwall
County Durham	67	16	5	88	List of SSSIs in County Durham
Cumbria	170	70	38	278	List of SSSIs in Cumbria
Derbyshire	54	28	17	99	List of SSSIs in Derbyshire
Devon	109	71	31	211	List of SSSIs in Devon
Dorset	103	20	16	139	List of SSSIs in Dorset
East Riding of Yorkshire	39	14	3	50	List of SSSIs in East Riding of Yorkshire
East Sussex	46	14	4	64	List of SSSIs in East Sussex
Essex	64	19	3	86	List of SSSIs in Essex
Gloucestershire	69	32	20	121	List of SSSIs in Gloucestershire
Greater London	30	7	0	37	List of SSSIs in Greater London
Greater Manchester	14	5	2	21	List of SSSIs in Greater Manchester
Hampshire	108	4	6	118	List of SSSIs in Hampshire
Herefordshire	62	21	4	83	List of SSSIs in Herefordshire
Hertfordshire	36	7	0	43	List of SSSIs in Hertfordshire
Isle of Wight	26	4	11	41	List of SSSIs on the Isle of Wight
Kent	67	21	10	98	List of SSSIs in Kent
Lancashire	49	14	6	69	List of SSSIs in Lancashire
Leicestershire	58	12	6	76	List of SSSIs in Leicestershire
Lincolnshire	98	23	3	121	List of SSSIs in Lincolnshire
Merseyside	10	1	3	14	List of SSSIs in Merseyside
Norfolk	123	25	15	163	List of SSSIs in Norfolk
North Yorkshire	162	56	23	241	List of SSSIs in North Yorkshire
Northamptonshire	48	9	0	57	List of SSSIs in Northamptonshire
Northumberland	TBC	TBC	TBC	114	List of SSSIs in Northumberland
Nottinghamshire	63	1	2	66	List of SSSIs in Nottinghamshire
Oxfordshire	76	27	7	110	List of SSSIs in Oxfordshire
Rutland	16	1	2	19	List of SSSIs in Rutland
Shropshire	TBC	TBC	TBC	110	List of SSSIs in Shropshire
Somerset	83	35	9	127	List of SSSIs in Somerset
South Yorkshire	18	14	3	35	List of SSSIs in South Yorkshire
Staffordshire	TBC	TBC	TBC	65	List of SSSIs in Staffordshire
Suffolk	109	28	5	142	List of SSSIs in Suffolk
Surrey	52	8	2	62	List of SSSIs in Surrey
Tyne and Wear	25	6	6	37	List of SSSIs in Tyne and Wear
Warwickshire	TBC	TBC	TBC	62	List of SSSIs in Warwickshire
West Midlands	11	9	3	23	List of SSSIs in the West Midlands
West Sussex	54	19	5	78	List of SSSIs in West Sussex
West Yorkshire	21	9	2	32	List of SSSIs in West Yorkshire
Wiltshire	108	21	5	134	List of SSSIs in Wiltshire
Worcestershire	106	15	5	121	List of SSSIs in Worcestershire

^{A} A number of sites are split between more than one county and will be included in this table more than once.

== Northern Ireland ==
County	Areas				Sites list
County	Biological	Geological	Both	Total	Sites list
County Antrim	TBC	TBC	TBC	TBC	List of ASSIs in Antrim
County Armagh	TBC	TBC	TBC	TBC	List of ASSIs in Armagh
County Down	TBC	TBC	TBC	TBC	List of ASSIs in Down
County Fermanagh	TBC	TBC	TBC	TBC	List of ASSIs in Fermanagh
County Londonderry	TBC	TBC	TBC	TBC	List of ASSIs in Londonderry
County Tyrone	TBC	TBC	TBC	TBC	List of ASSIs in Tyrone

== Scotland ==
Area of Search	Number of sites				Sites list
Area of Search	Biological	Geological	Both	Total	Sites list
Angus and Dundee	TBC	TBC	TBC	45	List of SSSIs in Angus and Dundee
Annandale and Eskdale	TBC	TBC	TBC	15	List of SSSIs in Annandale and Eskdale
Badenoch and Strathspey	TBC	TBC	TBC	23	List of SSSIs in Badenoch and Strathspey
Banff and Buchan	TBC	TBC	TBC	20	List of SSSIs in Banff and Buchan
Berwickshire and Roxburgh	TBC	TBC	TBC	54	List of SSSIs in Berwickshire and Roxburgh
Caithness	TBC	TBC	TBC	65	List of SSSIs in Caithness
Clydesdale and South East Glasgow	TBC	TBC	TBC	53	List of SSSIs in Clydesdale and South East Glasgow
Cumnock and Kyle	TBC	TBC	TBC	50	List of SSSIs in Cumnock and Kyle
Dumbarton and North Glasgow	TBC	TBC	TBC	46	List of SSSIs in Dumbarton and North Glasgow
Dunfermline and Kirkcaldy	TBC	TBC	TBC	25	List of SSSIs in Dunfermline and Kirkcaldy
East Perth	TBC	TBC	TBC	47	List of SSSIs in East Perth
East Ross and Cromarty	TBC	TBC	TBC	35	List of SSSIs in East Ross and Cromarty
Edinburgh and West Lothian	TBC	TBC	TBC	23	List of SSSIs in Edinburgh and West Lothian
Falkirk and Clackmannan	TBC	TBC	TBC	20	List of SSSIs in Falkirk and Clackmannan
Gordon and Aberdeen	TBC	TBC	TBC	35	List of SSSIs in Gordon and Aberdeen
Inverness	TBC	TBC	TBC	32	List of SSSIs in Inverness
Islay and Jura	TBC	TBC	TBC	20	List of SSSIs in Islay and Jura
Kincardine and Deeside	TBC	TBC	TBC	42	List of SSSIs in Kincardine and Deeside
Kintyre	TBC	TBC	TBC	12	List of SSSIs in Kintyre
Lorne	TBC	TBC	TBC	24	List of SSSIs in Lorne
Mid and East Lothian	TBC	TBC	TBC	TBC	List of SSSIs in Mid and East Lothian
Mid Argyll and Cowal	TBC	TBC	TBC	TBC	List of SSSIs in Mid Argyll and Cowal
Moray and Nairn	TBC	TBC	TBC	TBC	List of SSSIs in Moray and Nairn
Mull, Coll and Tiree	TBC	TBC	TBC	TBC	List of SSSIs in Mull, Coll and Tiree
Nithsdale	TBC	TBC	TBC	TBC	List of SSSIs in Nithsdale
North East Fife	TBC	TBC	TBC	TBC	List of SSSIs in North East Fife
North Lochaber	TBC	TBC	TBC	TBC	List of SSSIs in North Lochaber
North West Sutherland	TBC	TBC	TBC	TBC	List of SSSIs in North West Sutherland
North Wester Ross and Cromarty	TBC	TBC	TBC	TBC	List of SSSIs in North Wester Ross and Cromarty
Orkney	TBC	TBC	TBC	TBC	List of SSSIs in Orkney
Renfrew and Cunninghame	TBC	TBC	TBC	TBC	List of SSSIs in Renfrew and Cunninghame
Rùm and the Small Isles	TBC	TBC	TBC	TBC	List of SSSIs in Rum and the Small Isles
Shetland	TBC	TBC	TBC	TBC	List of SSSIs in Shetland
Skye and Lochalsh	TBC	TBC	TBC	TBC	List of SSSIs in Skye and Lochalsh
South East Sutherland	TBC	TBC	TBC	TBC	List of SSSIs in South East Sutherland
South Lochaber	TBC	TBC	TBC	TBC	List of SSSIs in South Lochaber
South Perth	TBC	TBC	TBC	TBC	List of SSSIs in South Perth
South Wester Ross and Cromarty	TBC	TBC	TBC	TBC	List of SSSIs in South Wester Ross and Cromarty
Stirling	TBC	TBC	TBC	TBC	List of SSSIs in Stirling
Tweeddale, Ettrick and Lauderdale	TBC	TBC	TBC	TBC	List of SSSIs in Tweeddale and Ettrick and Lauderdale
West Perth	TBC	TBC	TBC	TBC	List of SSSIs in West Perth
Western Isles North	TBC	TBC	TBC	TBC	List of SSSIs in Western Isles North
Western Isles South	TBC	TBC	TBC	TBC	List of SSSIs in Western Isles South
Wigtown and Stewartry	TBC	TBC	TBC	TBC	List of SSSIs in Wigtown and Stewartry

== Wales ==
Area of Search	Number of sites				Sites list
Area of Search	Biological	Geological	Both	Total	Sites list
Brecknockshire	TBC	TBC	TBC	84	List of SSSIs in Brecknock
Carmarthen & Dinefwr	TBC	TBC	TBC	79	List of SSSIs in Carmarthen & Dinefwr
Ceredigion	TBC	TBC	TBC	100	List of SSSIs in Ceredigion
Clwyd	TBC	TBC	TBC	81	List of SSSIs in Clwyd
East Gwynedd	TBC	TBC	TBC	103	List of SSSIs in East Gwynedd
Gwent	TBC	TBC	TBC	78	List of SSSIs in Gwent
Mid & South Glamorgan	TBC	TBC	TBC	69	List of SSSIs in Mid & South Glamorgan
Montgomeryshire	TBC	TBC	TBC	76	List of SSSIs in Montgomery
Preseli & South Pembrokeshire	TBC	TBC	TBC	75	List of SSSIs in Preseli & South Pembrokeshire
Radnorshire	TBC	TBC	TBC	87	List of SSSIs in Radnor
West Glamorgan	TBC	TBC	TBC	56	List of SSSIs in West Glamorgan
West Gwynedd	TBC	TBC	TBC	135	List of SSSIs in West Gwynedd
