= Barry Links =

Barry Links may refer to:

- Barry Links railway station, Barry, Angus, Scotland
- Barry Links (conservation area), a special area of conservation in Angus, Scotland
