= List of Sites of Special Scientific Interest in North Lochaber =

The following is a list of Sites of Special Scientific Interest in the North Lochaber Area of Search; for South Lochaber see List of SSSIs in South Lochaber. For SSSIs elsewhere in Scotland, see List of SSSIs by Area of Search.

- Ach an Todhair
- Ardgour Pinewoods
- Ben Alder And Aonach Beag
- Ben Nevis
- Blar na Caillich Buidhe
- Coille Phuiteachain
- Creag Meagaidh
- Druimindarroch
- Garry Falls
- Glen Barisdale
- Glen Beasdale
- Leven Valley
- Loch Arkaig Pinewood
- Loch Dubh
- Loch Morar
- Loch Shiel
- Lochailort
- Lon Leanachain
- Mallaig Coast
- Parallel Roads of Lochaber
- Quoich Spillway
- Rannoch Lochs
- South Laggan Fen
