= List of Areas of Special Scientific Interest in County Down =

This is a list of the Areas of Special Scientific Interest (ASSIs) in County Down in Northern Ireland, United Kingdom.

In Northern Ireland the body responsible for designating ASSIs is the Northern Ireland Environment Agency – a division of the Department of Environment (DoE).

Unlike the SSSIs, ASSIs include both natural environments and man-made structures. As with SSSIs, these sites are designated if they have criteria based on fauna, flora, geological or physiographical features. On top of this, structures are also covered, such as the Whitespots mines in Conlig, according to several criterion including rarity, recorded history and intrinsic appeal.

For other sites in the rest of the United Kingdom, see List of SSSIs by Area of Search.

Data is available from the Northern Ireland Environment Agency's website in the form of citation sheets for each ASSI.

Site name	Reason for Designation			Area^{[A]}		Council	Year declared	Map
Site name	Biological Interest	Geological Interest	Historical or Cultural Interest	Hectares	Acres	Council	Year declared	Map
Aughnadarragh Lough ASSI149	✓			5.18	12.8	Ards; Down	1999	
Aughnadarragh Lough SAC045	✓			5.18	12.8	Ards; Down	2005	
Ballyquintin Point NNR040	✓	✓		n/a	n/a	Ards	1987	
Ballyquintin Point ASSI087	✓	✓		29.99	74.1	Ards	1995	
Copeland Islands	✓			81.55	201.52	Ards	2004	
Whitespots		✓		2.04	5.05	Ards	1999	

- Ballybannan ASSI
- Ballycam ASSI
- Ballykilbeg ASSI
- Ballynagross Lower ASSI
- Ballyquintin Point ASSI
- Black Lough ASSI
- Blaeberry Island Bog ASSI
- Carlingford Lough ASSI
- Carrowcarlin ASSI
- Castle Enigan ASSI
- Castlewellan Lake ASSI
- Clarehill ASSI
- Corbally ASSI
- Craigantlet Woods ASSI
- Derryleckagh ASSI
- Eastern Mournes ASSI
- Greenan ASSI
- Greenan Lough ASSI
- Gruggandoo ASSI
- Heron and Carrigullian Loughs ASSI
- Hollymount ASSI
- Inner Belfast Lough ASSI
- Kilbroney River ASSI
- Killard ASSI
- Killough Bay and Strand Lough ASSI
- Lackan Bog ASSI
- Lough Cowey ASSI
- Lough Neagh ASSI
- Loughkeelan ASSI
- Loughmoney ASSI
- Murlough ASSI
- Outer Ards ASSI
- Outer Belfast Lough ASSI
- Quoile ASSI
- Rostrevor Wood ASSI
- Scrabo ASSI
- Sheepland Coast ASSI
- Shimna River ASSI
- Strangford Lough Part I ASSI
- Strangford Lough Part II ASSI
- Strangford Lough Part III ASSI
- Tieveshilly ASSI
- Tullyratty ASSI
- Turmennan ASSI
- Woodgrange ASSI
