= List of Areas of Special Scientific Interest in County Tyrone =

This is a list of the Areas of Special Scientific Interest (ASSIs) in County Tyrone in Northern Ireland, United Kingdom.

In Northern Ireland the body responsible for designating ASSIs is the Northern Ireland Environment Agency – a division of the Department of Environment (DoE).

Unlike the SSSIs, ASSIs include both natural environments and man-made structures. As with SSSIs, these sites are designated if they have criteria based on fauna, flora, geological or physiographical features. On top of this, structures are also covered, such as the Whitespots mines in Conlig, according to several criterion including rarity, recorded history and intrinsic appeal.

For other sites in the rest of the United Kingdom, see List of SSSIs by Area of Search.

Data is available from the Northern Ireland Environment Agency's website in the form of citation sheets for each ASSI.

- Aghabrack ASSI
- Annaghagh Bog ASSI
- Ballysudden ASSI
- Baronscourt ASSI
- Bardahessiagh ASSI
- Benburb ASSI
- Black Bog ASSI
- Black Lough ASSI
- Brookend ASSI
- Butterlope Glen ASSI
- Cashel Rock ASSI
- Caledon and Tynan ASSI
- Corbylin Wood ASSI
- Cranny Bogs ASSI
- Cullentra Lough ASSI
- Deroran Bog ASSI
- Derrycloony Lough ASSI
- Dromore ASSI
- Drumcrow ASSI
- Drumharvey ASSI
- Drumlea and Mullan Woods ASSI
- Drummond Quarry ASSI
- Dunnaree Hill ASSI
- Essan Burn and Mullyfamore ASSI
- Fairy Water Bogs ASSI
- Fardross Stream ASSI
- Fymore Lough ASSI
- Glenmore Wood ASSI
- Grange Wood ASSI
- Kirlish ASSI
- Knocknacloy ASSI
- Lisdoo ASSI
- Lisnaragh ASSI
- Limehill Farm ASSI
- Little River ASSI
- Lough Corr ASSI
- Lough Macrory ASSI
- Lough McCall ASSI
- Lough Doo ASSI
- Lough Na Blaney Bane ASSI
- Lough Neagh ASSI
- Lurgylea ASSI
- Mountfield Quarry ASSI
- Mullaghcarn ASSI
- McKean's Moss ASSI
- McKean's Moss Part II ASSI
- Moneygal Bog ASSI
- Moneygal Bog Part II ASSI
- Murrins ASSI
- Owenkillew and Glenelly Woods ASSI
- Owenkillew River ASSI
- Rehaghy Wood ASSI
- River Faughan and Tributaries ASSI
- River Foyle and Tributaries ASSI
- Round Lough and Lough Fadda ASSI
- Scraghy ASSI
- Silverbrook Wood ASSI
- Slieve Beagh ASSI
- Sloughan and Willmount Glens ASSI
- Strabane Glen ASSI
- Straduff ASSI
- Tanderagee ASSI
- Teal Lough and Slaghtfreeden Bogs ASSI
- Teal Lough Part II ASSI
- Tonnagh Beg Bog ASSI
- Tully Bog ASSI
- Upper Ballinderry River ASSI
