= List of Sites of Special Scientific Interest in Kintyre =

The following is a list of Sites of Special Scientific Interest in the Kintyre Area of Search. For other areas, see List of SSSIs by Area of Search.

- Balnabraid Glen
- Bellochantuy and Tangy Gorges
- Claonaig Wood
- Dun Ban
- Glenacardoch Point
- Kintyre Goose Lochs
- Machrihanish Dunes
- Rhunahaorine Point
- Sanda Island
- Tangy Loch
- Tarbert to Skipness Coast
- Torrisdale Cliff
