= List of Sites of Special Scientific Interest in South Wester Ross and Cromarty =

The following is a list of Sites of Special Scientific Interest in the South Wester Ross and Cromarty Area of Search. For other areas, see List of SSSIs by Area of Search.

- Abhainn Alligin
- Allt nan Carnan
- An Teallach
- Ardlair - Letterewe
- Attadale
- Aultbea
- Baosbheinn
- Beinn Bhan
- Beinn Eighe
- Coille Dhubh
- Coulin Pinewood
- Doire Damh
- Fionn Loch Islands
- Inverasdale Peatlands
- Loch Maree
- Meall Imireach
- Monar Forest
- Rassal
- River Kerry
- Shieldaig Woods
- Slumbay Island
- Talladale Gorge
- Torridon Forest
- Wester Ross Lochs
