= List of Sites of Special Scientific Interest in Rum and the Small Isles =

Sites of Special Scientific Interest in Inner Hebrides

The following is a list of Sites of Special Scientific Interest (SSSIs) in the Rum and the Small Isles Area of Search. These SSSIs can be found by using the search box on the SiteLink website maintained by NatureScot/NàdarAlba. For other areas, see List of SSSIs by Area of Search.

- Camus Mor, Muck
- Canna and Sanday
- Eigg - An Sgurr and Gleann Charadail
- Eigg - Cleadale
- Eigg - Laig to Kildonnan
- Rum
