= List of Sites of Special Scientific Interest in Inverness =

The following is a list of Sites of Special Scientific Interest in the Inverness Area of Search. For other areas, see List of SSSIs by Area of Search.

- Affric - Cannich Hills (Note: Affric - Cannich Hills SSSI is part of Strathglass Complex Special Area of Conservation (SAC).)
- Ardersier Glacial Deposits
- Balnagrantach
- Beauly Firth
- Carn nan Tri-tighearnan
- Creag nan Clag
- Dalroy and Clava Landforms
- Dubh Lochs
- Easter Ness Forest
- Findhorn Terraces (Note: The citation of Findhorn Terraces SSSI does not mention Inverness, but it does mention Nairnshire, historically adjacent to the county of Inverness-shire, now both absorbed into Highland.)
- Gartally Limestone Quarries
- Glen Affric (Note: Part of Glen Affric SSSI overlaps with the West Inverness-shire Lochs SSSI.)
- Glen Strathfarrar
- Glen Tarff
- Glendoe Lochans
- Inverfarigaig
- Kildrummie Kames
- Knockie Lochs (Note: Knockie Lochs SSSI is part of Loch Knockie and Nearby Lochs Special Protection Area (SPA) due to the population of the threatened Slavonian grebe (Podiceps auritus) present.)
- Levishie Wood
- Liatrie Burn
- Littlemill Fluvioglacial Landforms
- Loch Ashie (Note: Loch Ashie is a Site of Special Scientific Interest (SSSI) because of the presence of pre- and post-breeding Slavonian grebes. It is also designated a Special Protection Area (SPA) because of this species.)
- Loch Battan
- Loch Bran
- Loch Ruthven
- Longman and Castle Stuart Bays (Note: Longman and Castle Stuart Bays SSSI is part of the Inner Moray Firth Special Protection Area (SPA).)
- Monadhliath
- Moniack Gorge (Note: Part of Moniack Gorge SSSI is also Moniack Gorge Special Area of Conservation (SAC) due to the presence of green shield-moss.)
- Torvean Landforms
- Urquhart Bay Wood (Note: Urquhart Bay Wood SSSI is also Urquhart Bay Wood SAC due to it being a habitat for alder woodland on a floodplain. This is unusual in the UK.)
- West Inverness-shire Lochs
- Whiteness Head
