= List of Sites of Special Scientific Interest in Lorne =

The following is a list of Sites of Special Scientific Interest in the Lorne Area of Search. For other areas, see List of SSSIs by Area of Search.

- Airds Park and Coille Nathais
- Allt Broighleachan
- Allt Coire Chailein
- Ard Trilleachan
- Barran Dubh
- Ben Heasgarnich
- Ben Lui
- Bernera Island
- Bonawe To Cadderlie
- Clach Tholl
- Clais Dhearg
- Coille Leitire
- Crannach Wood
- Dalavich Oakwood
- Doire Darach
- Glen Creran Woods
- Glen Nant
- Kennacraig and Esragan Burn
- Lismore Lochs
- Lynn of Lorn Small Islands
- Rannoch Lochs
- Rannoch Moor
- South Kerrera and Gallanach
- South Shian and Balure
