= List of Sites of Special Scientific Interest in Western Isles South =

The following is a list of Sites of Special Scientific Interest in the Western Isles South Area of Search. For Western Isles North see List of SSSIs in Western Isles North. For SSSIs elsewhere in Scotland, see List of SSSIs by Area of Search.

- Allt Volagir (Note: Allt Volagir is a wooded area near Howmore on South Uist. Nature Scot does not show that it has SSSI status.)
- Baleshare and Kirkibost
- Balranald Bog and Loch nam Feithean (Note: Balranald Bog and Loch nam Feithean SSSI is part of North Uist Machair Special Area of Conservation (SAC) for the habitats and species (Slender Naiad) present.) (Note: Balranald Bog and Loch nam Feithean SSSI is also part of North Uist Machair and Islands Special Protection Area (SPA) for the bird species present.)
- Berneray (Note: Berneray SSSI is part of North Uist Machair SAC for the habitats and species present.) (Note: Berneray SSSI is also part of North Uist Machair and Islands SPA for the bird species present.)
- Boreray (Note: Boreray SSSI is part of the North Uist Machair and Islands SPA for the bird species present.)
- Bornish and Ormiclate Machairs (Note: Bornish and Ormiclate Machairs SSSI is part of the South Uist Machair SAC for the habitats and species (Otter, Slender Naiad) present.) (Note: Bornish and Ormiclate Machairs SSSI is part of South Uist Machair and Lochs SPA for the bird species present.)
- Eoligarry
- Howmore Estuary, Lochs Roag and Fada (Note: Howmore Estuary, Lochs Roag and Fada SSSI is part of South Uist Machair SAC for the habitats and species present.) (Note: Howmore Estuary, Lochs Roag and Fada SSSI is part of South Uist Machair and Lochs SPA for the bird species present.)
- Loch an Duin
- Loch Bee (Note: Loch Bee SSSI is part of South Uist Machair SAC for the habitats and species present.) (Note: Loch Bee SSSI is part of South Uist Machair and Lochs SPA for the bird species present.)
- Loch Bee Machair (Note: Loch Bee Machair SSSI is part of South Uist Machair SAC for the habitats and species present.) (Note: Loch Bee Machair SSSI is part of South Uist Machair and Lochs SPA for the bird species present.)
- Loch Druidibeg
- Loch Hallan
- Loch nam Madadh (Note: Loch nam Madadh SSSI is part of Loch nam Madadh SAC for the habitats and species (otter) present.)
- Loch Obisary (Note: Loch Obisary SSSI is part of Obain Loch Euphoirt SAC due to the lagoons present.)
- Lochs at Clachan
- Machairs Robach and Newton (Note: Machairs Robach and Newton SSSI is part of North Uist Machair SAC for the habitats and species present.) (Note: Machairs Robach and Newton SSSI is part of North Uist Machair and Islands SPA due to the bird species present.)
- Mingulay and Berneray (Note: Mingulay and Berneray SSSI is also designated Mingulay and Berneray SPA because of the bird species present.)
- Mointeach Scadabhaigh (Note: Mointeach Scadabhaigh SSSI is also designated a SAC for the habitats present and a SPA for the bird species present.)
- Monach Islands
- Obain Loch Euphoirt (Note: Obain Loch Euphoirt SSSI is part of Obain Loch Euphoirt SAC for the habitats (lagoons) present.)
- Pabbay (Note: Pabbay SSSI is part of North Uist Machair and Islands SPA for the bird species present.)
- Rockall
- Small Seal Islands
- St Kilda
- Vallay (Note: Vallay SSSI is part of North Uist Machair SAC for the habitats and species present, and is part of North Uist Machair and Islands SPA for the bird species present.)
- West Benbecula Lochs
