= List of Sites of Special Scientific Interest in North Wester Ross and Cromarty =

The following is a list of Sites of Special Scientific Interest in the North Wester Ross and Cromarty Area of Search. For other areas, see List of SSSIs by Area of Search.

- Achnahaird
- An Teallach
- Ardlair - Letterewe
- Beinn Dearg
- Cailleach Head
- Corrieshalloch Gorge
- Creag Chorcurach
- Dundonnell Woods
- Fannich Hills
- Inverpolly
- Knockan Cliff
- Meall an-t-Sithe and Creag Rainich
- Priest Island
- Rhidorroch Woods
- Rubha Dunan
