= List of Sites of Special Scientific Interest in Western Isles North =

The following is a list of Sites of Special Scientific Interest in the Western Isles North Area of Search. For Western Isles South see List of SSSIs in Western Isles South. For SSSIs elsewhere in Scotland, see List of SSSIs by Area of Search.

- Achmore Bog (Note: Achmore Bog SSSI is part of Lewis Peatlands Special Area of Conservation (SAC) due to the habitats and mammal species present, and is also part of Lewis Peatlands Special Protection Area (SPA) due to the bird species present.)
- Cnoc A'Chapuill
- Flannan Islands
- Glen Valtos
- Gress Saltings
- Little Loch Roag Valley Bog
- Loch A' Sgurr Pegmatite
- Loch Dalbeg
- Loch Laxavat Ard and Loch Laxavat Iorach (Note: Loch Laxavat Ard and Loch Laxavat Iorach SSSI is part of Lewis Peatlands SPA due to the bird species present.)
- Loch na Cartach
- Loch nan Eilean Valley Bog (Note: Loch nan Eilean Valley Bog SSSI is part of Lewis Peatlands SAC due to the habitats and mammal species (otter) present. It is also part of Lewis Peatlands SPA due to the bird species present.)
- Loch Scarrasdale Valley Bog (Note: Loch Scarrasdale Valley Bog SSSI is part of Lewis Peatlands SAC due to the habitats and mammal species present. It is also part of Lewis Peatlands SPA due to the bird species present.)
- Loch Siadar (Note: Part of Loch Siadar SSSI is part of Loch Roag Lagoons SAC due to the coastal lagoons present.)
- Loch Stiapavat (Note: Loch Stiapavat SSSI is part of Ness and Barvas SPA because of the presence of the bird species corncrake.)
- Loch Tuamister
- Luskentyre Banks and Saltings
- Mangersta Sands
- North Harris (Note: North Harris SSSI is designated North Harris SAC due to the habitats and species (atlantic salmon, freshwater pearl mussel, otter) present. North Harris SSSI is also designated North Harris Mountains SPA due to the bird species (golden eagle) present.)
- North Rona and Sula Sgeir (Note: Part of North Rona and Sula Sgeir SSSI is part of North Rona SAC due to the habitats and mammal species (grey seal) present. North Rona and Sula Sgeir SSSI is also part of North Rona and Sula Sgeir SPA due to the bird species present.)
- Northton Bay
- Port of Ness
- Shiant Isles
- Small Seal Islands
- Tob Valasay (Note: Much of Tob Valasay SSSI is part of Loch Roag Lagoons SAC due to the coastal lagoon habitats present.)
- Tolsta Head
- Tong Saltings
