= List of Sites of Special Scientific Interest in South Perth =

The following is a list of Sites of Special Scientific Interest in the South Perth Area of Search, in Scotland. For other areas, see List of SSSIs by Area of Search.

- Back Burn Wood and Meadows
- Bishop Hill
- Black Loch (Cleish)
- Bog Wood and Meadow
- Carey
- Carsebreck and Rhynd Lochs
- Craig Rossie
- Devon Gorge
- Drummond Lochs
- Dupplin Lochs
- Gartwhinzean Meadow
- Glen Queich
- Gleneagles Mire
- Inner Tay Estuary
- Kincardine Castle Wood
- Lady Loch
- Loch Leven
- Lurg and Dow Lochs
- Methven Moss
- Pitkeathly Mires
- Quoigs Meadow
- Turflundie Wood
- Wether Hill
