= List of Sites of Special Scientific Interest in Annandale and Eskdale =

The following is a list of Sites of Special Scientific Interest in the Annandale and Eskdale Area of Search. For other areas, see List of SSSIs by Area of Search.

- Bell's Flow
- Bigholms Burn
- Castle Loch
- Dryfe Water
- Langholm - Newcastleton Hills (Note: Langholm - Newcastleton Hills SSSI is also a Special Protection Area (SPA) for the breeding of the hen harrier.)
- Lochmaben Lochs
- Moffat Hills (Note: Moffat Hills SSSI is designated a Special Area of Conservation (SAC) for the upland habitats present.)
- Penton Linns
- Perchhall Loch
- Raeburn Flow (Note: Raeburn Flow SSSI is also designated a Special Area of Conservation for the presence of raised bogs.)
- River Esk, Glencartholm
- River Tweed (Note: The River Tweed SSSI covers a large part of the Scottish Borders where it overlaps with other SSSIs. Since the River Tweed also forms part of the border with England, it also overlaps with Sites of Special Scientific Interest in England, administered by other conservation agencies.)
- Royal Ordnance, Powfoot
- Upper Solway Flats and Marshes (Note: Upper Solway Flats and Marshes SSSI was originally a set of separate Sites of Special Scientific Interest in and around the upper Solway Firth designated in both Scotland and England. Later they were merged, and differing legislation in England and Scotland meant that this SSSI now only covers land in Scotland.) (Note: Upper Solway Flats and Marches SSSI is also part of the Solway Firth Special Area of Conservation for the habitats and marine species present.) (Note: Upper Solway Flats and Marshes SSSI is also part of the Upper Solway Flats and Marshes Special Protection Area for the bird species present.)
