= List of Sites of Special Scientific Interest in Islay and Jura =

The following is a list of Sites of Special Scientific Interest in the Islay and Jura Area of Search. For other areas, see List of SSSIs by Area of Search.

- Ardmore, Kildalton and Callumkill Woodlands
- Beinn Shiantaidh
- Bridgend Flats
- Craighouse Ravine Jura
- Doire Dhonn
- Eilean Na Muice Duibhe
- Feur Lochain - Moine nam Faoileann
- Garvellachs
- Glac Na Criche
- Gruinart Flats
- Kinuachdrach
- Laggan Peninsula and Bay
- Loch Fada
- Loch Tallant
- North Colonsay
- Oronsay
- Rinns of Islay
- Rubha A Mhail to Uamhannan Donna Coast
- West Coast of Jura
- West Colonsay Seabird Cliffs
