= List of Areas of Special Scientific Interest in County Armagh =

This is a list of the Areas of Special Scientific Interest (ASSIs) in County Armagh in Northern Ireland, United Kingdom.

In Northern Ireland the body responsible for designating ASSIs is the Northern Ireland Environment Agency – a division of the Department of Environment (DoE).

Unlike the SSSIs, ASSIs include both natural environments and man-made structures. As with SSSIs, these sites are designated if they have criteria based on fauna, flora, geological or physiographical features. On top of this, structures are also covered, such as the Whitespots mines in Conlig, according to several criterion including rarity, recorded history and intrinsic appeal.

For other sites in the rest of the United Kingdom, see List of SSSIs by Area of Search.

Data is available from the Northern Ireland Environment Agency's website in the form of citation sheets for each ASSI.

Site name	Reason for Designation			Area^{[A]}		Council	Year declared	Map
Site name	Biological Interest	Geological Interest	Historical or Cultural Interest	Hectares	Acres	Council	Year declared	Map
Annacramph Meadows	✓			1.01	2.5	Armagh	1992	

- Brackagh Bog ASSI
- Caledon and Tynan ASSI
- Cam Lough ASSI
- Camlough Quarry ASSI
- Carlingford Lough ASSI
- Carrickastickan ASSI
- Cashel Loughs ASSI
- Cloghinny ASSI
- Crossbane Lough ASSI
- Derryvore ASSI
- Drumcarn ASSI
- Drumlougher Lough ASSI
- Fathom Upper ASSI
- Glendesha ASSI
- Kiltubbrid Loughs ASSI
- Lislea ASSI
- Levallymore ASSI
- Lough Gullion ASSI
- Lough Neagh ASSI
- Loughaveely ASSI
- Lurgan Lough ASSI
- Moyrourkan Lough ASSI
- Mullaghbane ASSI
- Peatlands Park ASSI
- Selshion ASSI
- Slieve Gullion ASSI
- Straghans Lough ASSI
- Tullyard ASSI
- Tullybrick Lough ASSI
