= List of Sites of Special Scientific Interest in South Lochaber =

The following is a list of Sites of Special Scientific Interest in the South Lochaber Area of Search; for North Lochaber see List of SSSIs in North Lochaber. For SSSIs elsewhere in Scotland, see List of SSSIs by Area of Search.

- Ard Trilleachan
- Ardgour Pinewoods
- Ardnamurchan
- Ardsheal Peninsula
- Beinn Iadain and Beinn na H-Uamha
- Callert De-notified (confirmed) on 22 March 2012
- Carnach Wood
- Claish Moss
- Doire Donn
- Drimnin to Killundine Woods
- Eas na Broige
- Garbh Shlios
- Glencoe
- Inninmore Bay
- Kentallen
- Kentra Bay and Moss
- Kingshouse
- Leven Valley
- Loch Aline
- Loch Moidart
- Loch Shiel
- Onich Dry Gorge
- Onich Shore
- Rannoch Moor
- River Moidart
- Rudha Cuil - Cheanna
- St John's Church
- Strontian Mines
- Strontian River
- Sunart
