= List of Areas of Special Scientific Interest in County Fermanagh =

This is a list of the Areas of Special Scientific Interest (ASSIs) in County Fermanagh in Northern Ireland, United Kingdom.

In Northern Ireland the body responsible for designating ASSIs is the Northern Ireland Environment Agency – a division of the Department of Environment (DoE).

Unlike the SSSIs, ASSIs include both natural environments and man-made structures. As with SSSIs, these sites are designated if they have criteria based on fauna, flora, geological or physiographical features. On top of this, structures are also covered, such as the Whitespots mines in Conlig, according to several criterion including rarity, recorded history and intrinsic appeal.

For other sites in the rest of the United Kingdom, see List of SSSIs by Area of Search.

Data is available from the Northern Ireland Environment Agency's website in the form of citation sheets for each ASSI.

- Annachullion Lough ASSI
- Banagher ASSI
- Bellanaleck ASSI
- Beagh Big ASSI
- Blackslee ASSI
- Boho ASSI
- Braade ASSI
- Burdautien Lough ASSI
- Carrickbrawn ASSI
- Castle Coole ASSI
- Cladagh (Swanlinbar) River ASSI
- Conagher ASSI
- Coolcran ASSI
- Corraslough Point ASSI
- Cruninish Island ASSI
- Cuilcagh Mountain ASSI
- Dernish Island ASSI
- Devenish Island ASSI
- Drumacrittin Lough ASSI
- Drumbegger ASSI
- Drumlisaleen ASSI
- Edenaclough Wood ASSI
- Ederney Quarry ASSI
- Fardrum and Roosky Turloughs ASSI
- Finn Floods ASSI
- Garvros ASSI
- Glennasheevar ASSI
- Glen East ASSI
- Gravel Ridge Island
- Ground Bridge ASSI
- Hare Island ASSI
- Horse Island ASSI
- Inishroosk ASSI
- Keadew ASSI
- Killymackan Lough ASSI
- Kilnameel ASSI
- Kilroosky Lough ASSI
- Knockballymore Lough ASSI
- Knocknashangan ASSI
- Knockninny Hill ASSI
- Largalinny ASSI
- Largy Quarry
- Larkhill ASSI
- Lenaghan Wood ASSI
- Lergan ASSI
- Lough Aleater ASSI
- Lough Anierin ASSI
- Lough Corry ASSI
- Lough Melvin ASSI
- Lough Naman Bog and Lake ASSI
- Lough Scolban ASSI
- Lurgan River Wood ASSI
- Magheramenagh ASSI
- Makenny ASSI
- Mill Lough ASSI
- Monawilkin ASSI
- Moneendogue ASSI
- Moninea Bog ASSI
- Mullynaskeagh ASSI
- Paris Island Big ASSI
- Pettigoe Plateau ASSI
- Ross ASSI
- Slieve Beagh ASSI
- Summerhill Lough ASSI
- Tattenamona Bog ASSI
- Tedd ASSI
- Tempo River ASSI
- The Cliffs of Magho ASSI
- Tower More ASSI
- Tullanaguiggy ASSI
- Tullysranadeega ASSI
- Upper Lough Erne - Belleisle ASSI
- Upper Lough Erne - Crom ASSI
- Upper Lough Erne - Galloon ASSI
- Upper Lough Erne - Trannish ASSI
- West Fermanagh Scarplands ASSI
