= List of Sites of Special Scientific Interest in Dunfermline and Kirkcaldy =

The following is a list of Sites of Special Scientific Interest in the Dunfermline and Kirkcaldy Area of Search, in Scotland. For other areas, see List of SSSIs by Area of Search.

== A–H ==
- Ballo and Harperleas Reservoirs
- Black Loch (Cleish)
- Camilla Loch
- Carlingnose
- Carriston Reservoir
- Cullaloe Reservoir
- Dalbeath Marsh
- Ferry Hills
- Firth of Forth
- Holl Meadows

== I–P ==
- Invertiel Quarry
- Lielowan Meadow
- Lockshaw Mosses
- Long Craig Island
- Lurg and Dow Lochs
- Orrock Hill
- Otterston Loch
- Park Hill and Tipperton Mosses

== R–Z ==
- Roscobie Hills
- Roscobie Quarry
- St Margaret's Marsh
- Star Moss
- Steelend Moss
- Swallow Craig Den
- Wether Hill
