= List of Sites of Special Scientific Interest in Banff and Buchan =

The following is a list of Sites of Special Scientific Interest (SSSIs) in the Banff and Buchan Area of Search. For other areas, see List of SSSIs by Area of Search.

- Bullers of Buchan Coast (Note: Bullers of Buchan Coast SSSI is part of Buchan Ness to Collieston Special Area of Conservation (SAC) due to the habitats present. Bullers of Buchan Coast SSSI is part of Buchan Ness to Collieston Special Protection Area (SPA) due to the bird species present.)
- Cairnbulg to St Combs Coast
- Cullen to Stakeness Coast
- Gamrie and Pennan Coast (Note: Part of Gamrie and Pennan Coast SSSI is Troup, Pennan and Lion’s Heads SPA due to the bird species present.)
- Geordie Craigs
- Gight Woods
- Hill of Longhaven
- Kirkhill
- Loch of Strathbeg (Note: Loch of Strathbeg SSSI is designated Loch of Strathbeg SPA due to the bird species present.)
- Moss of Crombie
- Moss of Cruden
- Philorth Valley
- Reidside Moss (Note: Reidside Moss SSSI is designated Reidside Moss SAC due to the presence of raised bog.)
- Rora Moss
- Rosehearty to Fraserburgh Coast
- Tore of Troup
- Turclossie Moss (Note: Turclossie Moss SSSI is also designated Turclossie Moss SAC due to the presence of raised bog.)
- Wartle Moss
- Whitehills to Melrose Coast (Note: The Whitehills to Melrose Coast SSSI connects eastwards to the Gamrie and Pennan Coast SSSI and westwards to the Cullen to Stakeness Coast SSSI.)
- Windy Hills
