= Ravenshall Wood =

Woodland in Dumfries and Galloway, Scotland

Coordinates: 54.8485°N 4.3109°W

Ravenshall Wood is a Site of Special Scientific Interest, located 5 kilometres east of Creetown in the historic county of Kirkcudbrightshire, Dumfries and Galloway, in southwest Scotland. It is on the lower part of the Kirkdale Estate.

It is rich in lichens. It is largely oak woodland. It also has Wych Elm, Ash, Hazel, Willow, Sycamore, Gene, Thorn, Elderberry. It does also possess rhododendron which is being eradicated.
