= Slamannan =

Village in Falkirk, Scotland

Coordinates: 55.9379°N 03.8333°W

Slamannan: Scottish Gaelic: Sliabh Mhanainn; Slope of the Manau tribe
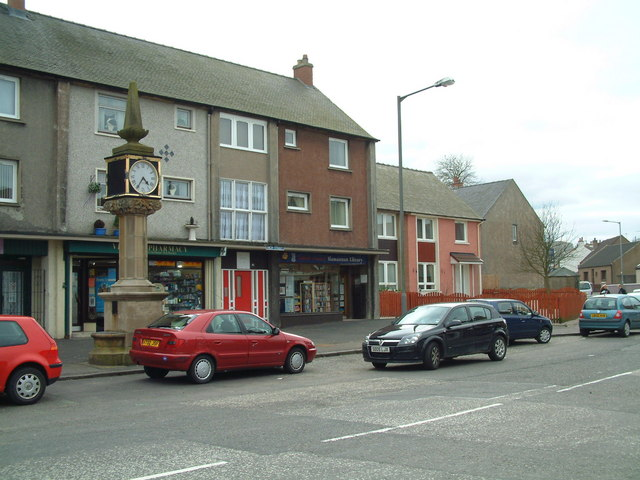
- Centre of Slamannan

- Location within the Falkirk council area
- Area: 0.19 sq mi (0.49 km^{2})
- Population: 1,180 (2020)
  - Density: 6,211/sq mi (2,398/km^{2})
- OS grid reference: NS855731
  - Edinburgh: 25.0 mi (40.2 km) E
  - London: 342 mi (550 km) SSE
- Civil parish: Slamannan
- Council area: Falkirk
- Lieutenancy area: Stirling and Falkirk
- Country: Scotland
- Sovereign state: United Kingdom
- Post town: FALKIRK
- Postcode district: FK1
- Dialling code: 01324
- Police: Scotland
- Fire: Scottish
- Ambulance: Scottish
- UK Parliament: Falkirk
- Scottish Parliament: Falkirk East

Slamannan (Scottish Gaelic: Sliabh Mhanainn) is a village in the south of the Falkirk council area in Central Scotland. It is 4.6 miles (7.4 km) south-west of Falkirk, 6.0 miles (9.7 km) east of Cumbernauld and 7.1 miles (11.4 km) north-east of Airdrie.

Slamannan is located at the cross of the B803 and B8022 roads, near the banks of the River Avon, close to the border between Falkirk and North Lanarkshire councils. Slamannan had a population of around 1,360 residents. In 1755 the population was recorded as 1209. Fifty years later the population was around the 1000 in the Parish of Slamanan (although elsewhere in the same volume the usual spelling is used). The 19th-century parish church can accommodate upwards of 700 people.

== History and toponymy ==
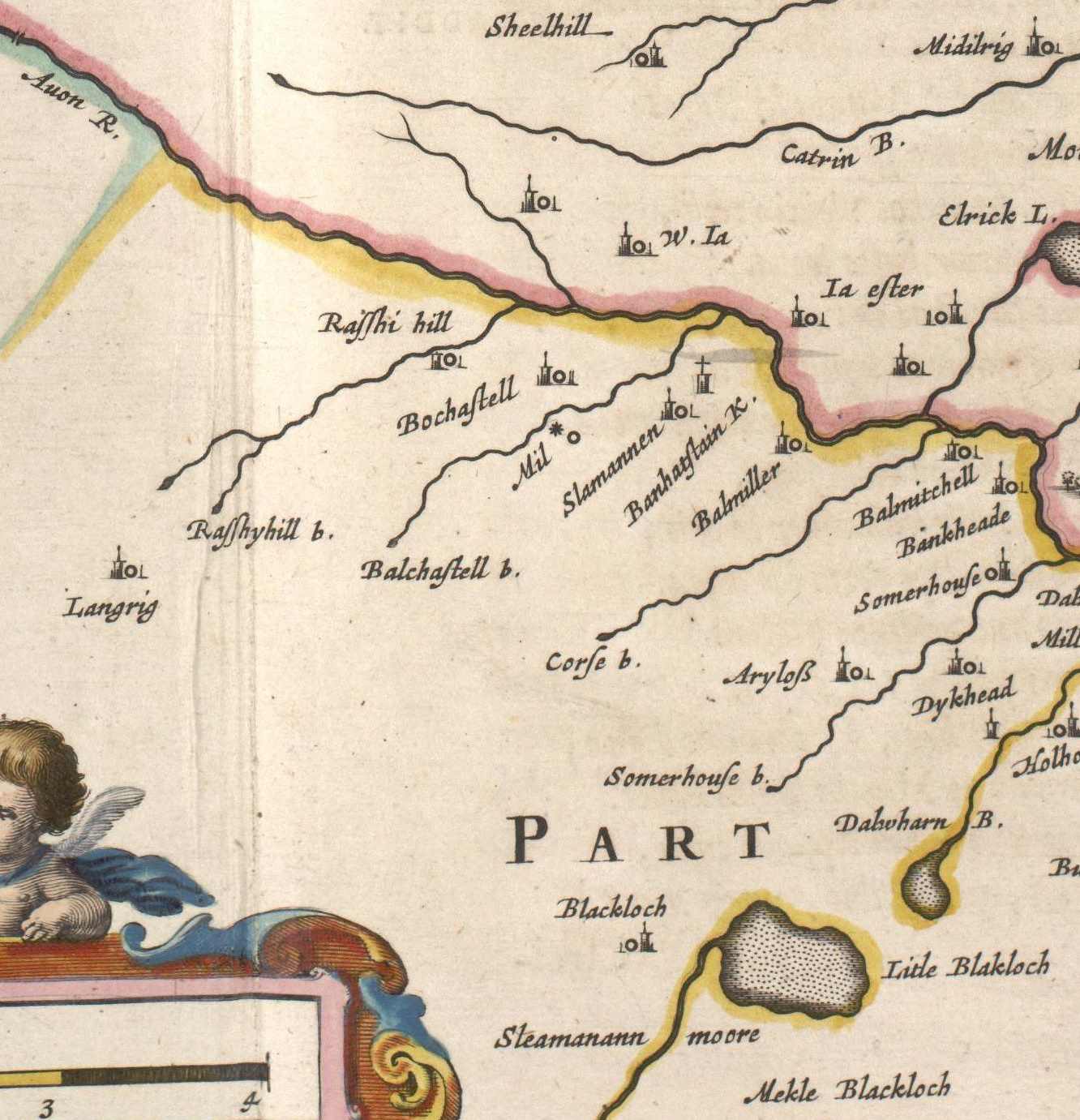
Blaeu's map from 1654 based on Pont's original c.1596 "The East Central Lowlands (Stirling, Falkirk & Kilsyth) - Pont 32" map depicting Slamannenn and Slea-manann Moore

The name relates to the Manaw Gododdin tribe about whom little is known. The name possibly means hill-face of Manan. The church at Slamannan used to be named after St Laurence. There is also a well which bears his name. It is recorded that in 1470 James II gave a charter to Lord Livingstone for the lands of Slamannan. James IV paid a guide sixpence to help him cross the moor of Slamannan in August 1491 during an excursion in the Bathgate area from Linlithgow Palace.

The area was once well known for steam coal which was worked at Longriggend. Farming was also practiced on about 40 farms in the parish. Several other old maps show Slamannan with various spellings including maps by John Grassom, John Ainslie and John Thomson. Only the Ordnance Survey Map shows the Culloch Burn. Gas lighting was set up in 1855. By 1882 the population had grown to 1644 with over 200 people in school. Newspaper articles mentioning Slamannan are available from the 18th century.

== Notable residents ==
Former Cabinet Minister Viscount Horne was born in Slamannan in 1871, the son of the village's Church of Scotland minister. After study at the University of Glasgow, he became a successful QC and was elected to represent Glasgow Hillhead in Parliament, and served as Minister of Labour, President of the Board of Trade and Chancellor of the Exchequer under Lloyd George after the First World War. He was ennobled in 1937 as Viscount Horne of Slamannan.

Other distinguished sons of Slamannan manse include John Cameron and his brothers Hugh, Sandy and Kenneth, all of whom won national titles in athletics in the 1960s and 70s (John and Kenneth as runners, and Hugh and Sandy in the heavy field events). All of them later went on to become doctors. Their father, Alexander Cameron was an interesting man in his own right, having been a miner who went up to Glasgow University from the West Central coalfields in the depths of the Depression to study divinity. After serving as an army padre throughout the War, he went back to the coalfields in 1946 as a Church of Scotland minister. He was also the village's Labour county councillor and convener of Stirlingshire Education Committee for twenty years until his death from black lung in 1968.

Early twentieth-century Everton footballer, Alex "Sandy" Young was born in Slamannan, and spent his youth years playing for Slamannan Juniors. He remains the all-time fourth-highest scorer for Everton, and scored the only goal at the 1906 FA Cup Final. Another footballer, Andrew Smith, also hailed from the village. He played for numerous clubs in Scotland and England including East Stirlingshire, West Bromwich Albion, Newton Heath (later renamed Manchester United) and Bristol Rovers.

Lance Corporal Samuel Frickleton, was born in Slamannan, in 1891, the son of Samuel and Elizabeth Frickleton. The family emigrated to New Zealand to take advantage of the plentiful jobs on offer in the coal mining industry, and the following year saw the outbreak of the First World War. Corporal Frickleton was awarded the military's highest honour for his actions in the Battle of Messines. His bravery was so outstanding that his commanding officer claimed he could have won the Victoria Cross "twice over".

Another notable military man from the village who was highly decorated was Sgt Observer James Bryce, who was awarded the Distinguished Flying Medal for his exploits in the RAF in WW2.

== See also ==
- List of places in Falkirk council area
- Slamannan F.C.
- Slamannan Rovers F.C.
- Slamannan Railway
- Abronhill
- Slamannan Plateau
- Mud Pit
- Slamannan Really Rocks
- Volvo Jim’s

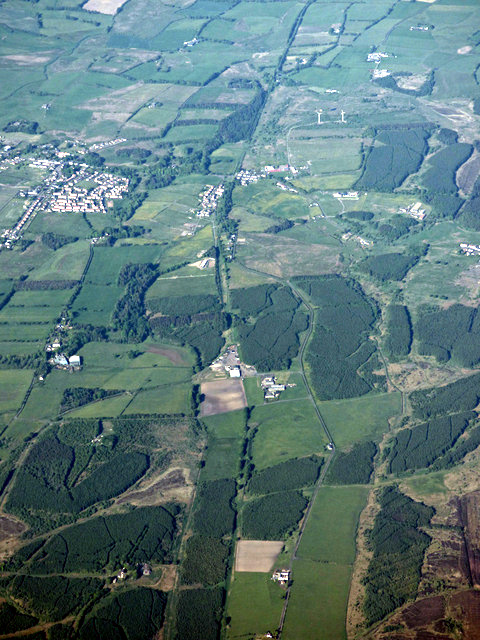
Slamannan and Slamannan Railway from the air
