= Avernish =

Coordinates: 57.27°N 05.58°W

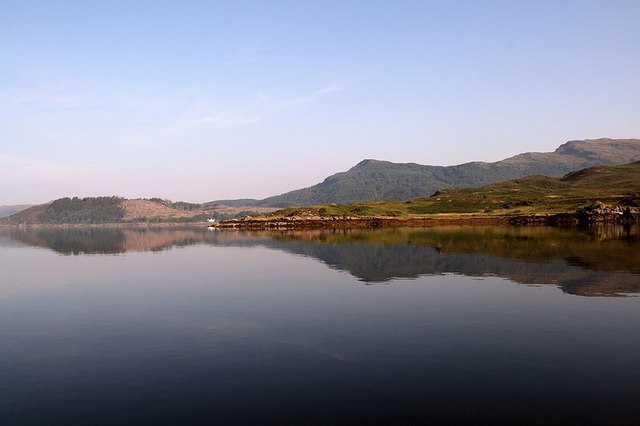
- Avernish, Loch Duich At the entrance to Loch Duich.

- Location within the Highland council area
- OS grid reference: NG8426
- Council area: Highland
- Country: Scotland
- Sovereign state: United Kingdom
- Police: Scotland
- Fire: Scottish
- Ambulance: Scottish

Avernish (Scottish Gaelic: Abhairnis) is a small rural hamlet located in the Highlands of Scotland, specifically in Ross-shire.

Nearby attractions include The Eilean Donan Castle and The Isle of Skye. The road to and through this community is single track only; livestock as well as domesticated animals are sometimes present on the road.
