= Àrd Bheinn =

Hill on Arran, in North Ayrshire, Scotland

Coordinates: 55°32′44″N 5°15′28″W

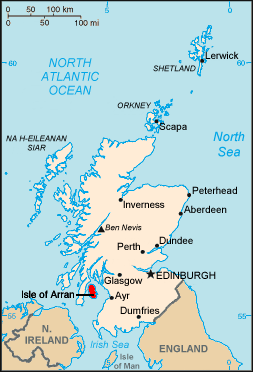
Location in Scotland

Àrd Bheinn (meaning "high mountain") is a mountain on the Isle of Arran in western Scotland. It has an elevation of 512 m (1,680 ft) and a prominence of 143.8 m (472 ft) and is classed as a Dodd and a Highland Five.

The mountain is a Site of Special Scientific Interest (SSSI) with an area of 458.7 ha (1.771 sq mi).
