= Loch Con =

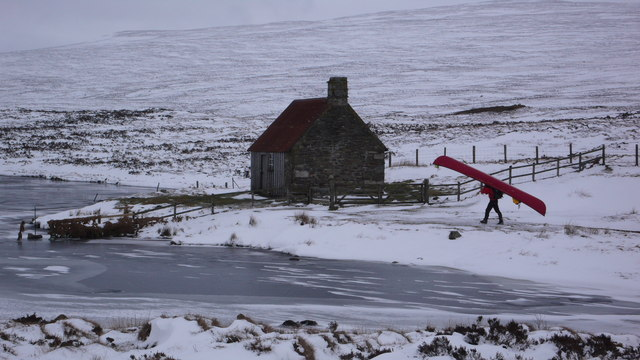
- Fishing hut at Loch Con

- Location in Perth and Kinross
- Location: NN68776792
- Coordinates: 56.784400°N 4.151484°W
- Type: freshwater loch
- Primary outflows: Allt Con
- Max. length: 1.3 km (0.81 mi)
- Max. width: 0.4 km (0.25 mi)
- Surface area: 25 ha (62 acres)
- Average depth: 3.6 ft (1.1 m)
- Max. depth: 8.8 ft (2.7 m)
- Water volume: 9,505,016 ft^{3} (269,152.1 m^{3})
- Shore length^{1}: 5 km (3.1 mi)
- Surface elevation: 413 m (1,355 ft)
- Islands: 0
- ^{1} Shore length is not a well-defined measure.

Loch Con is a small, remote, shallow, irregular shaped freshwater loch that is located in Glen Errochty in the Perth and Kinross council area, at the edge of the Scottish Highlands. It is directly north of Loch Errochty. Directly north of the loch at the east end is Loch Cruinn. It is the source of the Allt Con, which flows a short distance southwards past Sròn Choin to Loch Errochty. At the north-east end is Loch Cruinn, a very small dam, about 100 metres wide.

== See also ==
- List of lochs in Scotland
