= Coille Dalavil =

Valley on the Isle of Skye, Scotland

- IUCN category IV (habitat/species management area) (Note: In the UK, SSSIs are mostly categorised under IUCN category IV, with the future potential to classify primarily geological SSSIs in category III. A few are in category I.)
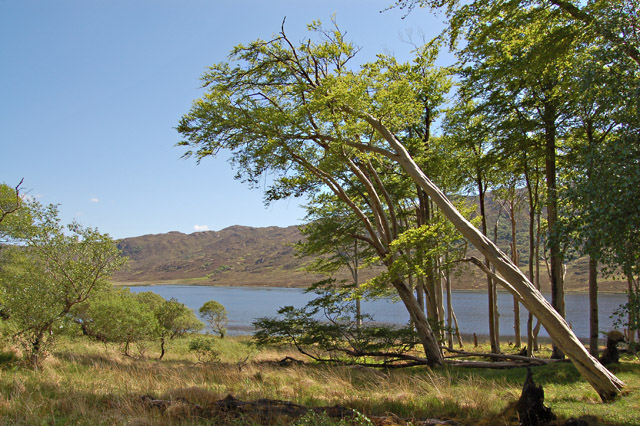
- Loch a' Ghlinne, Coille Dalavil

- Location within Highland
- Nearest town: Armadale, Skye
- Coordinates: 57.0789°N 5.968°W
- Designation: SSSI

Coille Dalavil is a glen located on the southern part of Sleat Peninsula, on the Isle of Skye that is characterized by the remote character of the terrain, which comprises woodland and bog areas. The area has been designated as a Site of Special Scientific Interest due to the unique habitat combination.

== Terrain and Setting ==
As to the ways of entering Coille Dalavil, the visitor passes the area of moor, and then climb to the top of the hill, where there is woodland, consisting of pine, beech, and a few oaks. In the glen itself, there is a small lake named Loch a' Ghlinne, surrounded by high hills. On the next stage of the journey, the terrain descends towards the sea, where the ruined settlement Dalavil is situated. With good weather conditions, the Cuillin mountains are visible.

=== Access and Walking ===
First of all, the route begins on the road connecting Kilbeg and Tarskavaig. Further on, one should pass through moorland to the woodland area, where the route turns into the rough and wet track, almost disappearing after the Loch a' Ghlinne. No public transport reaches Coille Dalavil; the nearest bus serves Sabhal Mòr Ostaig, which is located on the A851 road, 4 kilometres (2.5 mi) away.

== Ecology ==
Coille Dalavil features a woodland populated by a variety of trees and shrubs, including Sorbus aucuparia, Betula, and Pinus sylvestris varieties. The valleys below transition between base-rich flood-plain fen and blanket bog that are covered in lichen and inhabited by damselflies and dragonflies. The lichen is under pressure by overgrazing from deer and by encroachment of invasive beech species.

== History and Archaeology ==
Nowadays the territory is abandoned, but some ruins dating back to post-medieval period can still be seen; they can be linked to agriculture practices, such as crofting or shieling. In any case, the ruins are of little archaeological value in comparison with other similar sites; they give only one side of the historical perspective on inhabitation of this area.

== Conservation ==
As the site is classified as a Site of Special Scientific Interest. The task of conservation here is in preservation of the invertebrate life of both woodland and bog habitats. Achieving this aim involves maintaining the undisturbed natural course of waters, preventing damage to the wetland transition area, and preserving the lichen-filled canopy of woodland.
