= MV Lairds Loch =

History

United Kingdom
- Name: MV Lairds Loch
- Namesake: Laird's Loch, near Coupar Angus
- Owner: 1944-69 Burns & Laird, Glasgow
- Port of registry: Glasgow
- Route: Glasgow – Derry; later Glasgow – Dublin
- Builder: Ardrossan Dockyard, Ardrossan
- Yard number: 393
- Launched: 9 March 1944
- Fate: Sold 1969

Israel
- Name: MV Hey Daroma
- Owner: 1969-70 Sefinot Ltd, Israel; 1970 Hey Daroma Ltd, Israel
- Route: Sharm el Sheik to Eilat
- Fate: Wrecked 3 September 1970

General characteristics
- Type: Passenger and cargo vessel
- Tonnage: 1,736 GRT
- Length: 263 ft (80 m)
- Beam: 41 ft (12.5 m)
- Draught: 13.5 ft (4.1 m)
- Installed power: 2x 8-cylinder Atlas Polar M48M direct reversing diesel engines. 2560bhp
- Propulsion: Twin screw
- Speed: 13 knots
- Capacity: passengers

MV Lairds Loch was a passenger and cargo vessel built for the Irish Sea crossing.

== History ==
Built in 1944 for Burns & Laird Line, MV Lairds Loch operated from Glasgow, initially to Derry and later to Dublin.

In 1969 she was sold to Israeli owners, and on 16 November 1969 was attacked by Arab frogmen and beached near Eilat. Repaired and returned to service, she ran aground on 7 September 1970 in the Gulf of Aqaba and was a total loss.

== Service ==
MV Lairds Loch was primarily employed on the Glasgow to Derry service, though she later worked on the Glasgow to Dublin route.
