= List of Sites of Special Scientific Interest in Mid and East Lothian =

The following is a list of Sites of Special Scientific Interest in the Mid and East Lothian Area of Search, in Scotland. For other areas, see the list of SSSIs by Area of Search.

| Site name | Photograph | Area | Date of designation | Location | Map | Citation | Description |
|---|---|---|---|---|---|---|---|
| Aberlady Bay | | 582 hectares | 14 July 1952 | 56.018°N 2.873°W | (Note: Couldn't be found on NatureScot.) | | |
| Bangley Quarry | | 3.92 hectares | 4 February 1991 | | | | The site has a trachybasalt dyke that cuts vertically through the lava sequence and has large (up to 5cm) clear crystals of sanidine feldspar that shows Carlsbad twinning. The presence of the sanidine indicates metastable preservation, which is very rare and is attributed to rapid cooling of the rock. These specimens are the highest quality in Britain. |
| Barns Ness Coast | | 258.68 hectares | 30 April 1984 | | | | The site contains Lower Carboniferous limestone that is rich in fossils so it can show a correlation between the Scottish Lower Carboniferous and the Northumbria Lower Carboniferous. It also contains a dissected raised beach platform that is of geomorphological interest along with uncommon habitats for the Lothian area like beach-head salt marshes and enriched dune grassland. It also has a diversity of wild flowers and locally rare plant species. |
| Auchencorth Moss | | 105.59 hectares | 19 April 1991 | | | | The site contains Sphagnum moss carpets which remain wet, which is a rare feature in the Lothian area because most has been degraded. Several species of Sphagna have been identified, and the rest of the site contains Calluna vulgaris, Erica tetralix, Deschampsia flexuosa, and cotton-grass. |
| Bass Rock | | 7.61 hectares | 15 August 1983 | 56.08°N 2.64°W | | | The site rises 107 metres above sea level and supports the largest single-rock northern gannet colony in the world. It numbers about 48,000 pairs and contains 22% of the UK's breeding population. |
| Bilston Burn | | 16.59 hectares | 11 March 1986 | | | | The site shows major Dinantian sections that is Lower Carboniferous, proving much of the local Carboniferous succession. Named succession for coals and limestone have been proved along with fish bone-bed underneath the limestone, and is of great importance for comparison of sites in the Midland Valley. The ground flora has the characteristics of ancient woodland, which is one of few examples at Midlothian. |
| Black Burn | | 31.53 hectares | 16 January 1990 | | | | The site contains dry valley slopes with grasslands of Juncus acutiflorus and traditional grazing has allowed sward with herb species and also allows numerous plants such as the Lotus pedunculatus. The unimproved grassland, marshy grassland and enriched undisturbed flushes are all declining in the area. |

- Crichton Glen
- Dalkeith Oakwood
- Danskine Loch
- Dundreich Plateau
- Fala Flow
- Firth of Forth
- Forth Islands
- Garleton hills
- Gladhouse Reservoir
- Habbies Howe - Logan Burn
- Hadfast Valley
- Hewan Bank
- Keith Water
- Lammer Law
- Lammermuir Deans
- Levenhall Links
- Moorfoot Hills
- Newhall Glen
- North Berwick Law
- North Esk Valley
- Papana Water
- Peeswit Moss
- Rammer Cleugh
- Roslin Glen
- Traprain Law
- Woodhall Dean
