= Balnaguard Glen =

Scottish Wildlife Trust reserve

Coordinates: 56.641°N 3.730°W

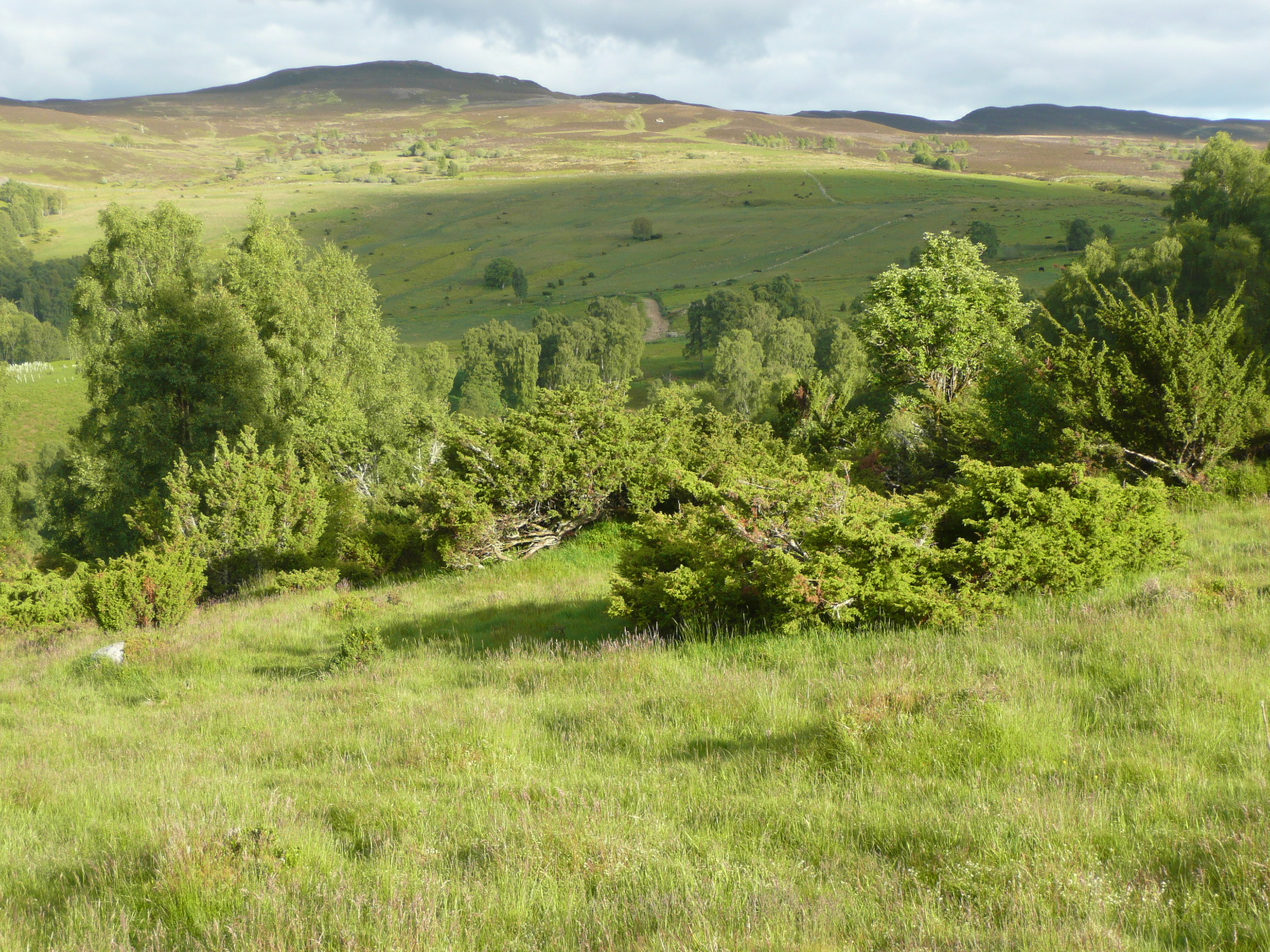
Juniper in Balnaguard Glen

Balnaguard Glen is a Scottish Wildlife Trust reserve near the village of Balnaguard, Perthshire. It is notable for its juniper woodland, which is amongst the largest in Perthshire.

== Description ==
The reserve covers an area of 55 hectares, through which the Balnagurad Burn runs. The gully is steep-sided, and once hosted a footpath, though landslips have made the old route dangerous and impassable. There are several waterfalls. To the east of the gully lies a birch wood, and to the west are numerous areas of juniper woodland.

== Flora ==
The glen was formerly more extensively wooded, and there have been recent tree plantings adjoining the birch wood in order to diversify the variety of plant and animal life. The juniper woodland, which lies primarily in the west of the reserve, needs to be maintained by the frequent removal of fast-growing bracken, which would otherwise swamp the slow-growing juniper. Further west, beyond the juniper, is an area of grassland.

== Fauna ==
There are numerous species which may be observed in the reserve, namely red deer, mountain hare, kestrels and pine martens.

== Accessibility ==
There is a small car park at the foot of the reserve, just outside the village. There is a way marked trail, but it is steep and rough, and can be difficult to pass in wet weather. It is dangerous to try to access the gully, as the land there is unstable and very prone to landslides.
