= Inchcruin =

Island in Scotland

Coordinates: 56°5′11″N 4°35′44″W

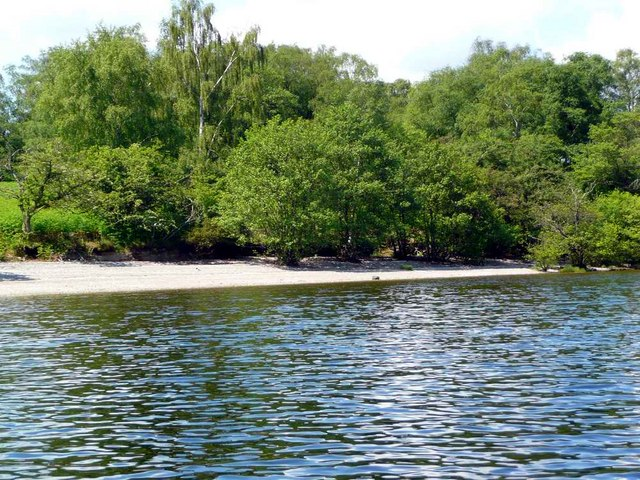
Beach on Inchcruin

Inchcruin is an island in Loch Lomond in Scotland. It is not to be confused with Creinch, which has occasionally been referred to as "Inchcroin".

== Geography ==
Inchcruin is one of an island group just south of Luss. It is 3/4 mile (1.2 kilometres) long, and 50 feet (15 metres) in elevation at its highest point. Its name means "round island" in the Scottish Gaelic language, although it is not round, but a rather jagged shape. It has a couple of beaches, and is wooded, with some open fields.

Only a very narrow channel, called the Geggles separates Inchcruin from Inchmoan. At only 3–4 ft (90–120 cm) deep, it is sometimes possible to wade between the islands.

== History ==
The travel writer, H.V. Morton visited Loch Lomond in the 1930s, and mentions Inchcruin briefly and wrongly as "Inchcruim".

In the 18th century it was used as an asylum for the insane. It contains one house, around 200 years old, which was inhabited in the past by people who farmed on the island. It is now a holiday retreat.

The island is classified by the National Records of Scotland as an inhabited island that "had no usual residents at the time of either the 2001 or 2011 censuses."

== See also ==
- List of islands of Scotland
