= Loch Achnacloich =

Loch in Ross and Cromarty, Scotland

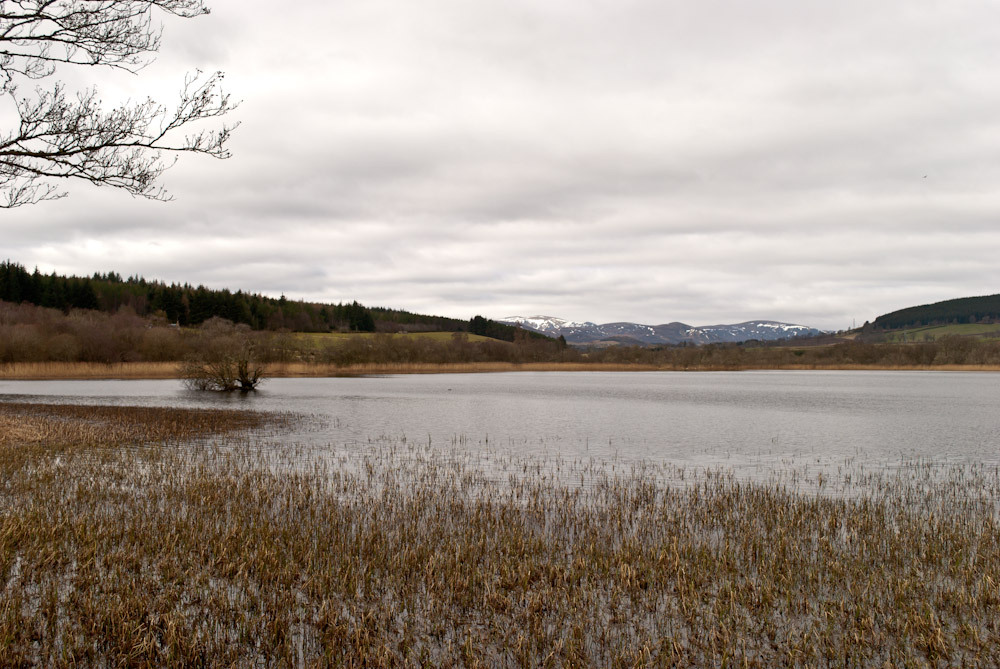
- Shore of Loch Achnacloich on a dull day

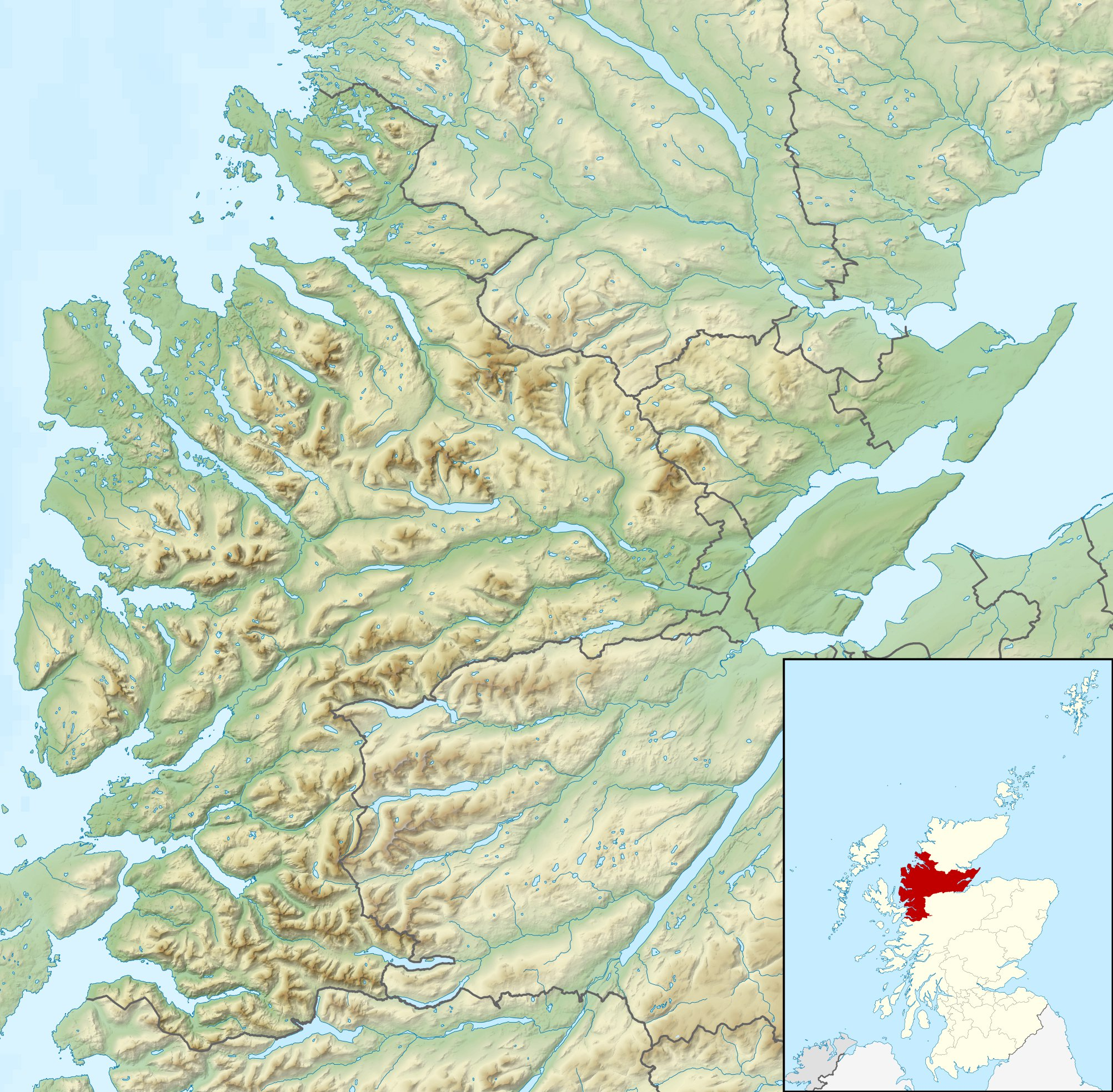
- Location within Ross and Cromarty
- Location: NH66507361
- Coordinates: 57.732400°N 4.243600°W
- Type: freshwater loch
- Max. length: 0.42 km (0.26 mi)
- Max. width: 0.18 km (0.11 mi)
- Surface area: 7 ha (17 acres)
- Average depth: 14.1076 ft (4.3000 m)
- Water volume: 10,172,319.1 ft^{3} (288,048.00 m^{3})
- Shore length^{1}: 1 km (0.62 mi)
- Surface elevation: 117 m (384 ft)
- ^{1} Shore length is not a well-defined measure.

Loch Achnacloich is a very shallow loch located about 4 kilometres (2.5 mi) north of Alness in Ross and Cromarty, Scottish Highlands, Scotland.

== Geography ==
The Burn of Achnacloich flows into the loch at its western end, and emerges at its eastern end as the Inchindown Burn, which (after another name change as the Kinrive Burn) flows into the Balnagown River. Loch Achnacloich is remarkable for the beauty of the sequestered and richly wooded glen in which is it situated. The loch sits in a shallow valley in the same orientation as the loch. Both the north and south are heavily wooded with the highest peak, more a hill, being Cnoc Corr Guinie at 396 metres (1,299 ft) in the north, overlooking the loch.

== Special Area of Conservation ==
Loch Achnacloich is a Special Area of Conservation. It is considered a good example of a loch with a diverse growth of aquatic plants, particularly on its southern and western sides. Many of the species found in Loch Achnacloich are more commonly associated with more southern parts of the UK. The loch supports six pondweed Potamogeton species as well as the nationally scarce least water-lily Nuphar pumila. The loch itself is considered to have a high biological productivity.
