= Woodhall Loch =

Loch in Scotland

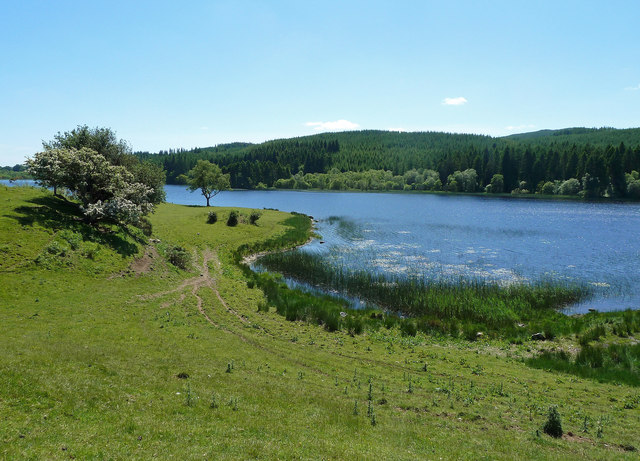
- Woodhall Loch from its eastern shore, looking south

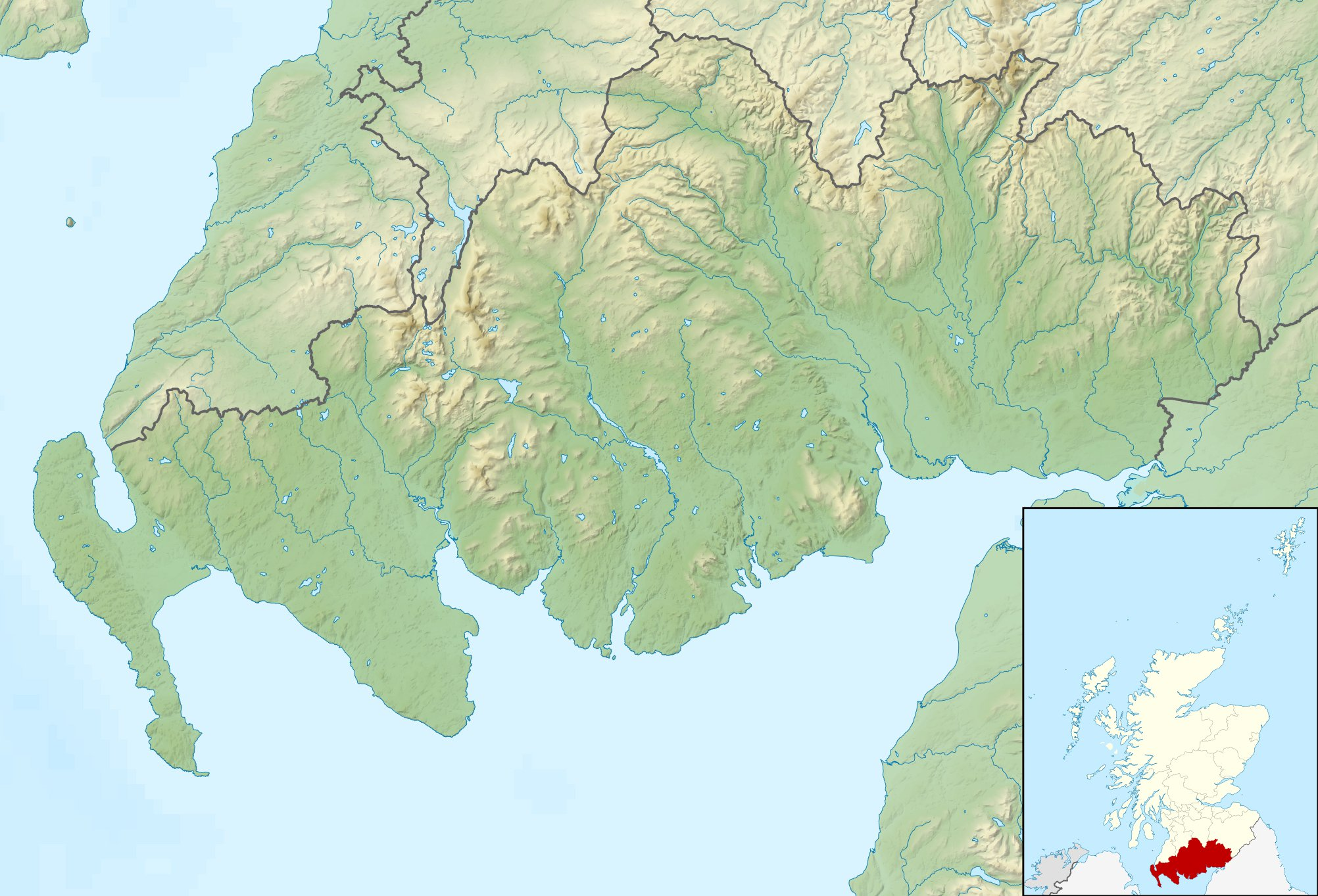
- Location within Dumfries and Galloway
- Location: Dumfries and Galloway
- Coordinates: 54°59′02.3″N 4°04′45.6″W
- Primary inflows: Kenick Burn, Laurieston Burn, Summerhill Glen
- Primary outflows: Crae Lane, River Dee, Galloway
- Basin countries: Scotland, United Kingdom
- Max. length: 2.33 km (1.45 mi)
- Max. width: 340 m (1,120 ft)
- Max. depth: 15 m (49 ft)
- Surface elevation: 56.3 m (185 ft)

Woodhall Loch is a narrow loch in Dumfries and Galloway, Scotland, 1.6km north of the village of Laurieston. The A762 runs along its east shore.

The loch is a popular spot for angling, with common species including northern pike, European perch, and common roach. There has been a boathouse on its southern shore since at least the 1910s.

Alongside Loch Dee and Loch Grannoch, Woodhall Loch was the subject of a 1903 bathymetrical survey by "the father of modern oceanography", Sir John Murray.
