= List of SSSIs in East Gwynedd =

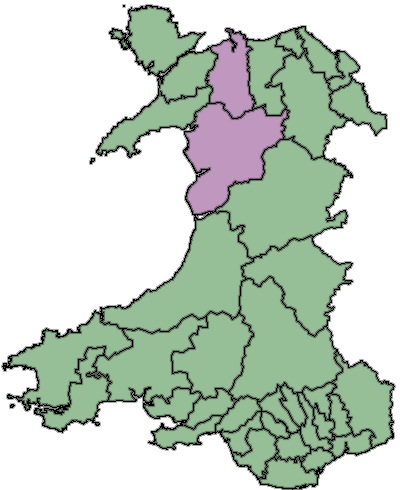
East Gwynedd AOS

Lists of Sites of Special Scientific Interest in East Gwynedd (1974–1996) comprise:

- List of Sites of Special Scientific Interest in Conwy County Borough (western part)
- List of Sites of Special Scientific Interest in Gwynedd (eastern part)
