= Black Loch =

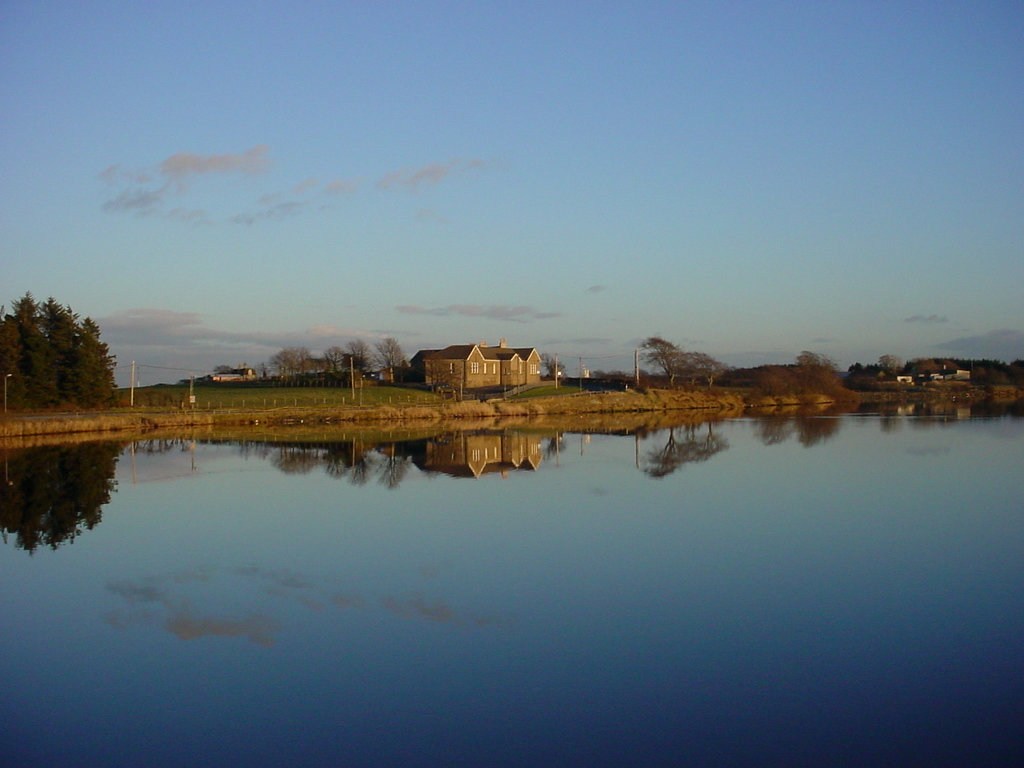

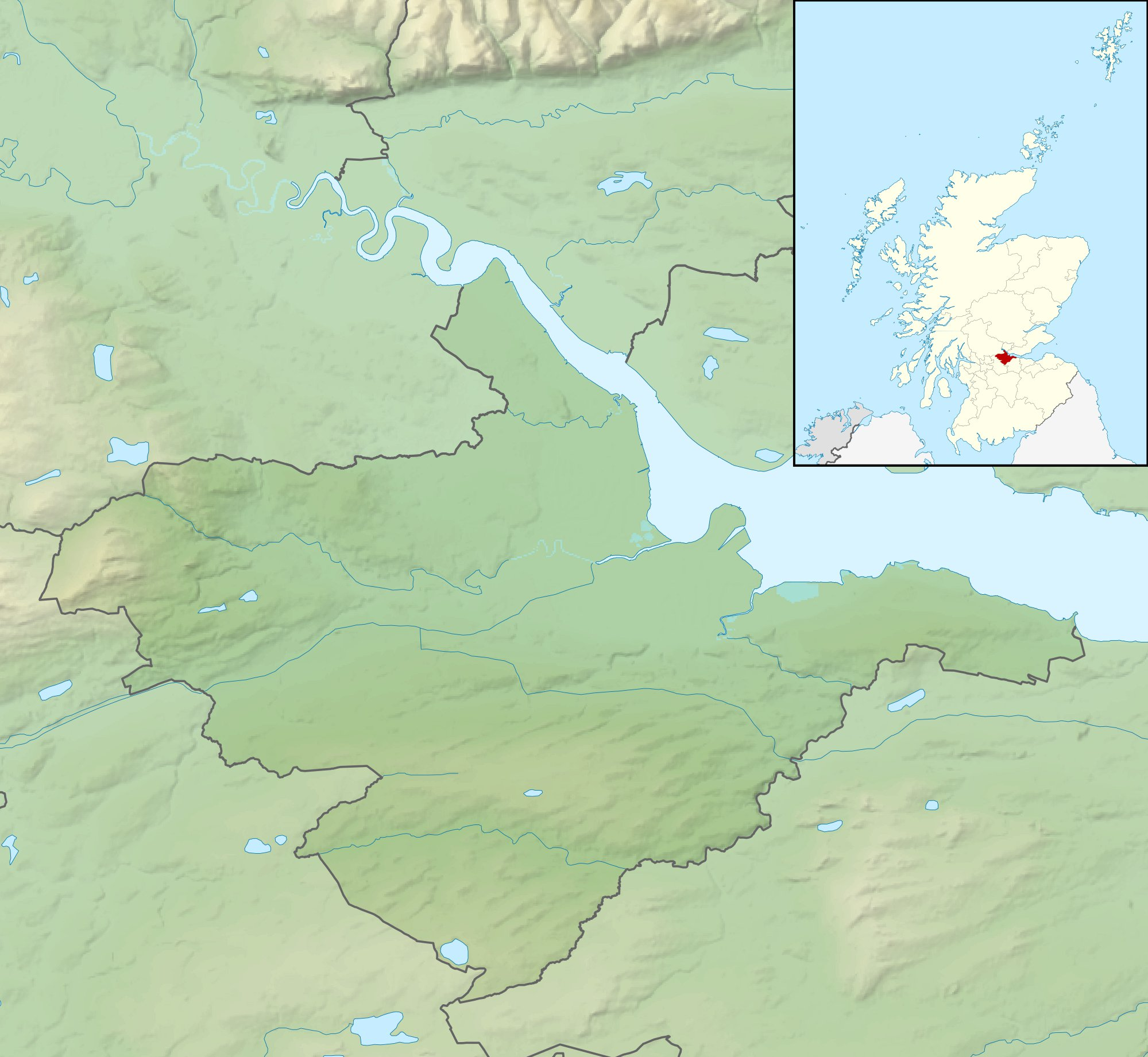
- Location within Falkirk
- Location: Falkirk
- Coordinates: 55°54′34″N 3°49′23″W
- Type: Reservoir
- Basin countries: Scotland

The Black Loch is a small freshwater loch or reservoir in the Falkirk council area, Scotland. It is near the village of Limerigg and close to the boundary with North Lanarkshire.

The surface area of the Black Loch was enlarged in the early 1790s. A small canal was cut at the western side, so that run off from the moss would feed the loch and a dam built to enclose a larger volume of water which was required by the Monkland Canal at Woodhall. Therefore, this loch or reservoir to be more precise is not only the source of the North Calder Water but also an important source of the water supply for the Monkland Canal and further downstream, the Forth and Clyde Canal at Glasgow. The loch is now used for fly fishing, swimming, kayaking and paddle boarding.
