= Coyles of Muick =

Scottish conservation area

- Site of Special Scientific Interest
- Location of Coyles of Muick.
- Grid reference: grid reference NO327913
- Interest: Biological (Calaminarian grassland)
- Area: 134.18 hectares (331.6 acres)

Coyles of Muick is a Site of Special Scientific Interest (SSSI) and Special Area of Conservation (SAC) located south-east of Ballater in the Deeside area of Aberdeenshire, Scotland. The site is of international importance for its unique vegetation growing on serpentine rock.

== Description ==
The site covers a conical hill rising to an altitude of approximately 600 metres. It is characterized by extensive outcrops of serpentine rock, which creates a chemically distinct soil high in magnesium and heavy metals but low in calcium. This toxicity limits the growth of many common plant species, allowing a specialized "Calaminarian grassland" community to thrive in the open rocky debris.

== Flora ==
Coyles of Muick represents the second-largest extent of near-natural serpentine debris in Scotland. Because the serpentine at this location is more calcareous than other Scottish sites, it supports a diverse flora that includes both serpentine-specialists and alpine species. Key species found on the site include:

- Northern rock-cress
- Alpine mouse-ear
- Alpine cinquefoil
- Yellow mountain saxifrage
- Thrift

The lower slopes are dominated by ling heather and transitions into fen and bog habitats.

== Conservation ==
The site is monitored by NatureScot. Operations requiring consent from the authorities include changes in grazing regimes, extraction of minerals, and any activities that might disturb the fragile soil layer or specialized plant communities.
