= List of Sites of Special Scientific Interest in Caithness =

The following is a list of Sites of Special Scientific Interest (SSSIs) in the Caithness Area of Search. For other areas, see List of SSSIs by Area of Search.

- Achanarras Quarry
- Banniskirk Quarry
- Beinn Freiceadain and Ben Dorrery
- Berriedale Cliffs
- Berriedale Water
- Blar Nam Faoileag (Note: Blar nam Faoileag SSSI is part of the Caithness and Sutherland Peatlands Special Area of Conservation (SAC) due to the habitats and species present. Blar nam Faoileag SSSI is also part of the Caithness and Sutherlands Peatlands Special Protection Area (SPA) due to the bird species present.)
- Broubster Leans (Note: Broubster Leans SSSI is also Broubster Leans SAC due to the habitat it contains. Broubster Leans SSSI is also part of the Caithness Lochs SPA due to the bird species present.)
- Loch Caluim Flows (Note: Loch Caluim Flows SSSI is part of Caithness and Sutherland Peatlands SAC due to the habitats and species present. Loch Caluim Flows SSSI is part of Caithness and Sutherland Peatlands SPA due to the bird species present.)
- Loch Heilen
- Loch Lieurary
- Loch of Durran
- Loch of Mey
- Loch of Wester (Note: Loch of Wester SSSI is also designated Loch of Wester SAC due to the habitats present. Loch of Wester SSSI is part of the Caithness Lochs SPA due to the bird species present.)
- Loch of Winless
- Loch Scarmclate (Note: Loch Scarmclate SSSI is part of Caithness Lochs SPA due to the bird species present.)
- Loch Watten (Note: Loch Watten SSSI is also designated Loch Watten SAC due to the habitats present. Loch Watten SSSI is part of the Caithness Lochs SPA due to the bird species present.)
- Long Berry Coast
- Lower Wick River
- Morven and Scaraben (Note: Morven and Scaraben SSSI includes the peak of Morven and the Scaraben ridge.)
- Moss of Killimster (Note: Moss of Killimster SSSI is part of the Caithness and Sutherland Peatlands SAC due to the habitats and species present. Moss of Killimster SSSI is part of the Caithness and Sutherland Peatlands SPA due to the bird species present.)
- Newlands of Geise Mire
- Oliclett (Note: Oliclett SSSI is part of Caithness and Sutherland Peatlands SAC due to the habitats and species present. Oliclett SSSI is also part of Caithness and Sutherland SPA due to the bird species present.)
- Ousdale Burn
- Pennylands
- Phillips Mains Mire
- Red Point Coast (Note: Red Point Coast SSSI is part of the North Caithness Cliffs SPA due to the bird species present.)
- Reisgill Burn
- River Thurso
- Rumsdale Peatlands (Note: Rumsdale Peatlands SSSI is part of the Cathness and Sutherland Peatlands SAC due to the habitats and species present. It is also part of the Caithness and Sutherland Peatlands SPA due to the bird species present. Part of Rumsdale Peatlands SSSI overlaps with the River Thurso SAC, designated for the presence of atlantic salmon.)
- Sandside Bay
- Shielton Peatlands (Note: Shielton Peatlands SSSI is part of the Caithness and Sutherland Peatlands SAC due to the habitats and species present. Shielton Peatlands SSSI is part of the Caithness and Sutherland Peatlands SPA due to the bird species present.)
- Sletill Peatlands (Note: Sletill Peatlands SSSI is on the border of Sutherland and Caithness. It is part of the Caithness and Sutherland Peatlands SAC due to the habitats and species present. It is part of the Caithness and Sutherland Peatlands SPA due to the bird species present.)
- Spittal Quarry
- Strathmore Peatlands (Note: Strathmore Peatlands SSSI is part of the Caithness and Sutherland Peatlands SAC due to the habitats and species found in it. Strathmore Peatlands SSSI is part of the Caithness and Sutherland Peatlands SPA due to the bird species present. Part of Strathmore Peatlands SSSI overlaps with the River Thurso SAC, due to the presence of atlantic salmon.)
- Stroma (Note: Stroma SSSI is part of the North Caithness Cliffs SPA due to the bird species present on the sea cliffs within the SSSI.)
- Stroupster Peatlands (Note: Stroupster Peatlands SSSI is part of Caithness and Sutherland Peatlands SAC due to the habitats and species present. Stroupster Peatlands SSSI is part of Caithness and Sutherland Peatlands SPA due to the bird species present.)
- Thrumster Mill Loch
- Ushat Head
- Westerdale Quarry
- Westfield Bridge
- Weydale Quarry
- Wick River Marshes
