= List of Sites of Special Scientific Interest in Moray and Nairn =

SSSIs in Moray and Nairn

The following is a list of Sites of Special Scientific Interest (SSSIs) in the Moray and Nairn areas of search.These sites can be found on the SiteLink website maintained by NatureScot/NàdarAlba. For the Moray area of search "Moray" can be entered in the search box. The Nairn area of search has been incorporated in the Highland local authority so SSSIs in Nairn have to be searched by name.

Where a reference is given on the list of SSSIs, it shows the webpage for that SSSI on the SiteLink website. Notes have been included about some of the SSSIs. Further information about them, and about SSSIs where no notes are included, can be found by following the links to SSSI Map and SSSI Citation given on the website for the SSSI cited.

For other areas, see List of SSSIs by Area of Search.

- Allt A'Choire
- Bochel Wood
- Boghole, Muckle Burn
- Buinach and Glenlatterach
- Burn of Ballintomb
- Cairngorms (Note: The Cairngorms SSSI is situated within the Cairngorms National Park but does not cover all of it.)
- Carn nan Tri-tighearnan
- Cawdor Wood (Note: Cawdor Wood SSSI is near the village of Cawdor in the Scottish Highlands.)
- Clashach-Covesea
- Coleburn Pasture
- Creag Nan Gamhainn
- Culbin Sands, Forest and Findhorn Bay
- Cullen to Stake Ness Coast
- Cutties Hillock
- Den of Pitlurg
- Dipple Brae
- Eastern Cairngorms (Note: The Eastern Cairngorms SSSI is situated within the Cairngorms National Park but only includes part of it.)
- Findhorn Terraces
- Findrassie
- Fodderletter
- Gull Nest
- Hill of Towanreef
- Inchrory
- Kellas Oakwood
- Kildrummie Kames
- Ladder Hills
- Lethenhill
- Loch Oire
- Loch Spynie
- Lossiemouth East Quarry
- Lossiemouth Shore
- Lower Findhorn Woods
- Lower River Spey
- Lower Strathavon Woodlands
- Masonshaugh
- Mill Wood
- Moidach More
- Moss of Crombie
- Muckle Burn, Clunas (Note: Muckle Burn is not a unique name in Scotland as will be seen by the other SSSI Boghole, Muckle Burn also on this list. See also List of rivers in Scotland.)
- Northern Corries, Cairngorms
- Quarry Wood
- Randolph's Leap
- River Spey (Note: The River Spey SSSI does not cover the whole of the course of the River Spey. See also Lower River Spey SSSI and see the River Spey article for more about the river and its surroundings.)
- Scaat Craig
- Shiel Wood Pastures
- Spey Bay (Note: Spey Bay SSSI is situated near the mouuth of the River Spey and near the settlement of Spey Bay. Refer to the website of the SSSI and these articles for more information.)
- Spynie Quarry (Note: Spynie Quarry SSSI is near the site of the former burgh of Spynie, a town that is no longer inhabited.)
- Teindland Quarry
- Tips of Corsemaul and Tom Mor (Note: The Tips of Corsemaul and Tom Mor are two geographically distinct but proximal areas of land included in one SSSI.)
- Tynet Burn
- Whiteness Head (Note: Whiteness Head SSSI includes Whiteness Head and an adjacent area above the low water line.)
