= Barry Links (conservation area) =

Area of sand dunes in Scotland

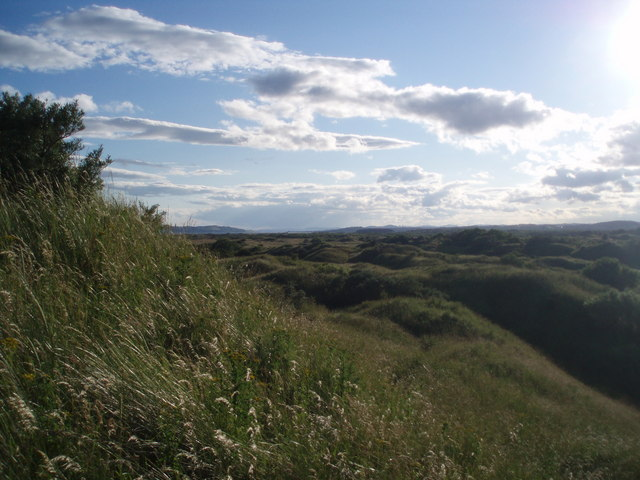
- Sand dunes at Barry Links

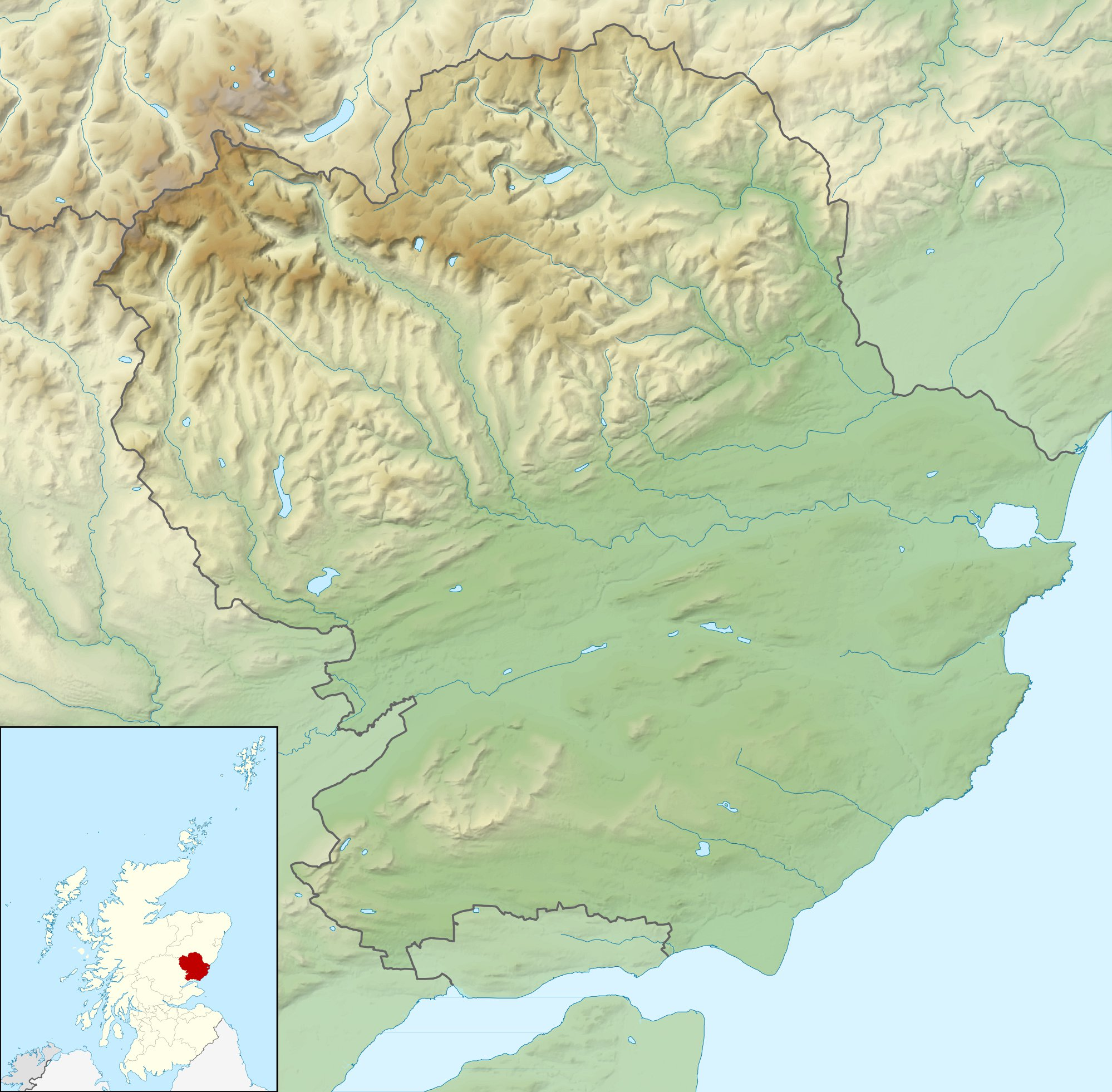
- Location within Angus
- Location: Angus, Scotland, United Kingdom
- Nearest city: Carnoustie
- Coordinates: 56°28′31″N 2°44′31″W
- Area: 770 ha (1,900 acres)
- Designation: Special Area of Conservation
- Governing body: NatureScot

Barry Links is a special area of conservation and sand dune system (referred to as "links" in the Scots language), in Angus, on the east coast of Scotland. It is situated between the towns of Monifieth and Carnoustie, with most of the site being encompassed by the Barry Buddon Training Area. The site is of European importance for its dune habitats and associated wildlife.

== Location ==
Barry Links is an area of low-lying coastal sand dunes that lie between Monifieth and Carnoustie. They extend to the mouth of the Firth of Tay, behind the Buddon Ness headland. The site is surrounded to the North by the Dundee-Aberdeen railway line, with a designated stop on the line - Barry Links station.

== Conservation Status ==
Barry Links is a Site of Special Scientific Interest (SSSI) and a Special Area of Conservation (SAC) under the EU Habitats Directive, due to its dune systems. The SAC covers approximately 770 hectares (3.0 sq mi).

The area also forms part of a Special Protection Area (SPA) for birds, under the Birds Directive.

== Ecology ==
The dune system is one of the largest in eastern Scotland, displaying a full successional sequence of formation and development, from embryonic to fixed dunes.

The system supports several differing habitats, including dune slacks and areas of Atlantic decalcified fixed dunes, showing that long-term leaching has influenced soil development.

== Fauna ==
As a SAC, the site hosts several bird species, including:

- Terns
- Shelducks
- Skylarks
- Meadow Pipits
- Linnets
- Stonechats
- Fieldfares
- Redwings

The dune also supports small mammals, amphibians and reptiles.

== Land Use ==
Much of the Barry Links area is controlled by the Barry Buddon Training Area, which is a military training site and rifle range. The Northeastern edge of the dunes hosts the Carnoustie Golf Course.
