= Inchmoan =

Island in Scotland

Coordinates: 56°04′N 4°36′W

Inchmoan (Scottish Gaelic: Innis na Mòna or Innis-Mòine meaning 'peat island') is an island in Loch Lomond, Scotland.

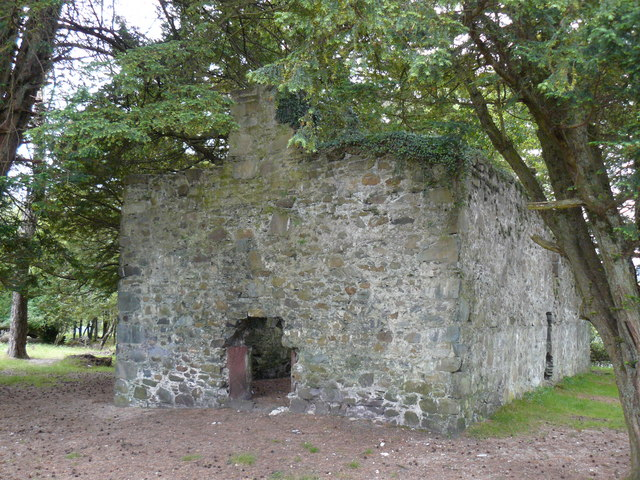
Ruined cottage on Inchmoan

== Geography ==
It is one of an island group just south of Luss. Only a short stretch of water separates it from the island of Inchcruin. The connection between Inchcruin and Inchmoan is very shallow, only 1–2 feet (30–60 centimetres), and it is possible to wade between the islands.

Inchmoan is known for its large sandy beaches, and is low lying, and marshy. There are shingle beaches on either side of the island, meaning that on a sunny day, at least one is sheltered. For this reason and others, it is popular with campers and picnickers.

The island was once owned by the Colquhouns of Luss, and now owned by Luss Estates, which is owned by the Colquhouns of Luss. A large two-storey ruin stands at the western point but no record exists of any occupants.

The name of the island stems from its use by the Luss people as a source of peat fuel for the village fires.

The beaches and bays are sandy and comparatively safe for bathing but the interior is, in places, totally impassable due to the dense growth of rhododendrons, gorse and other spreading trees.

Privately owned, the island is about 1 mile (1.5 kilometres) long, with a highest point about 30 feet (9 metres) in elevation.

The island was used for peat fuel for nearby Luss.

== History ==
Stone Age tools have been found on Inchmoan, suggesting it has had an occasional human presence for a number of years. There is also the ruin of a cottage on the island.

== Flora ==
Despite its peaty name, Inchmoan has a wide variety of plant life, including pear, blueberry, alder, gorse, birch, rhododendron, Scots pine and bog myrtle.
