= Slamannan Plateau =

Geographic area in Scotland

The Slamannan Plateau is a geographic area and special protection area in the Central Belt of Scotland which encompasses the small villages of Slamannan, Limerigg and Caldercruix. It is situated 5 km south of Falkirk and about 4 km east of Cumbernauld, at around 170 m above sea level.

The area is a mosaic of improved grasslands and rough pasture which includes wetlands dominated by Juncus species (rushes), raised, blanket and intermediate bogs and two shallow lochs within Fannyside Muir. The area attracts a nationally important population of taiga bean geese (Anser fabalis fabalis).

The area became an area of special scientific interest on 5 September 2007 due to the Slamannan Plateau becoming the primary site for wintering taiga bean geese in the UK with over 50% of the total population in recent years. The majority of the rest of the UK population winters in Norfolk with occasional small flocks elsewhere.

The geese feed, mostly by day, on agricultural fields mainly eating grasses. In the early evening they fly to their roost sites, or if the weather is bad they can roost within their preferred feeding fields. The birds visit the area between October and the end of February each year.
