= Inner Tay Estuary =

Coordinates: 56.39°N 3.16°W

The Inner Tay Estuary is the inner, western part of the Firth of Tay, from the Tay Railway Bridge in the east to the Queen's Bridge over the River Tay in Perth and the bridge in Bridge of Earn on the River Earn. It is one of the largest estuaries in eastern Scotland, and is up to 2.5 km wide. It consists primarily of intertidal sand and mud flats extending seaward to the main channel, most of which are on the northern shore. Landward of these are salt marsh and Phragmites reedbeds. The estuary contains two large islands: Mugdrum Island, opposite Newburgh; and Moncreiffe Island, immediately below Perth. The estuary's narrow form, and the large volume of freshwater from the Rivers Tay and Earn, restrict the influence of saltwater west of the Tayport narrows. Much of the tidal water is freshwater or mildly brackish.

== Nature conservation ==
The apx. 20 km area of the estuary between the railway bridge and the confluence of the Rivers Tay and Earn is a site of special scientific interest (SSSI). The current SSSI was notified in August 1999 and extends to 4,115 hectares or thereby. Scottish Natural Heritage provides more information about it in its site management statement.

Perth & Kinross Council and Dundee City Council manage part of the north shore as a local nature reserve. RSPB manages areas of reedbed.

The Phragmites reedbeds on the north shore are some 15 km long, and thought to be the largest and most continuous in the UK. They are tidal, flooded on spring tides, and support nationally important breeding bird populations. With the help of groynes built out into the estuary, reedbeds were planted in the 19th century to protect agricultural land, and have since expanded naturally. Much of the agricultural land was formerly marsh which itself was drained and cultivated by Cistercian monks in the 15th and 16th centuries. In 1974, commercial harvesting of the reedbeds for thatching began, and has continued to the present day, albeit now on a scale reduced by RSPB. At its height, approximately 30-40% of the reedbeds were cut by Tayreed (company) on an annual rotation (single wale) using a Seiga mechanical harvester. Even at that extent, the cutting was considered compatible with, if not beneficial for, the bird, plant and insect interests of the beds.

The best remaining salt marsh is at the eastern, seaward end of the reedbeds. These support locally rare salt marsh plants including sea club-rush (Bolboschoenus maritimus), grey bulrush (Schoenoplectus tabernaemontani) and common salt marsh grass (Puccinellia maritima).

The Inner Tay was the type locality of the midge Culicoides machardy (1960), but the species was reduced to a junior synonym of the previously described Culicoides machuriensis, a species of northern China, northern Russia, Scandinavia and Scotland. The mud flats of Invergowrie Bay are the first in Britain found to support the large polychaete worm Marenzellaria viridis, a species normally found only in northeastern North America.

Scottish Natural Heritage has commissioned and published habitat survey reports for the estuary.

== Access ==
Public roads run within a few hundred metres of the north and south shores, providing easy access to view the estuary and its wildlife, though parking is limited in many places.

South shore: Wormit, Balmerino, Newburgh, Elcho Castle

North bank: Riverside Drive in Dundee (by the railway bridge); Invergowrie, Kingoodie, Port Allen, Powgavie, Cairnie Pier

Perth: From both banks, the bridges, Moncreiffe Island

Bridge of Earn: The bridge.

The minor road from Newburgh to Balmerino also offers excellent panoramic views northwards over the inner estuary.
