= Conservation in the United Kingdom =

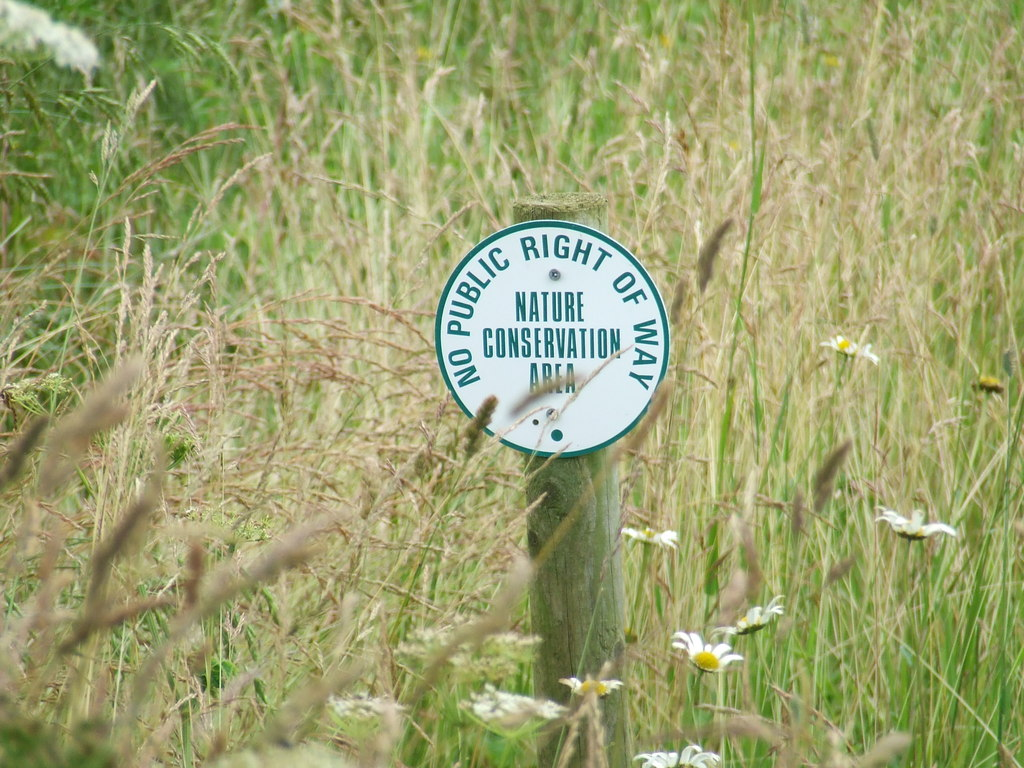
Conservation area signage in Carlton, Cambridgeshire

Conservation of the cultural heritage and natural environment of the United Kingdom takes place within a complex legal and institutional structure including both governmental and non-governmental bodies.

The UK Government acknowledges that the natural environment of the UK is depleted and continuing to decline. In response, multiple policies and legislation have been put in place in attempt to protect the natural and built environments and enhance biodiversity.

With the advent of devolved government for Scotland, Wales and Northern Ireland, the responsibilities for environment and conservation have become more complicated with a variety of UK-wide, national (to each constituent country) and local bodies, as well as non-governmental organisations, operating in the field.

== History ==
Environmental protection law has a long history in the UK. Among the first known environmental management laws was the Charter of the Forest, brought in by the King of England alongside the Magna Carta in 1217.

A nature conservation movement developed in England in the second half of the 19th century, the focus of which was the relationship between the natural environment and human wellbeing. This was accompanied by an environmentalist literary movement; for instance John Ruskin promoted ideals of beauty linked to the preserving the natural environment. This public interest caused the establishment on non-governmental organisations (NGOs) concerned with the preservation of species or nature reserves, such as the Society for the Protection of Birds and the National Trust for Places of Historic Interest and Natural Beauty.

The first legislation on protecting built cultural heritage was the Ancient Monuments Protection Act 1882, which made provision to protect 50 prehistoric sites.

Conversation of cultural property on a scientific basis began in Britain after the First World War, during which some assets of the British Museum had suffered inadvertent damage after having been placed in the London Underground to prevent war damage.

During the first four decades of the 20th century, many calls had been made for access to mountains, controls on urban development, for nature reserves and for national parks. Government involvement in conservation began at the end of the 1940s as part of post–Second World War reconstruction planning. The passing of the National Parks and Access to the Countryside Act 1949 saw the creation of the Nature Conservancy (the predecessor to the modern Natural England, NatureScot and Countryside Council for Wales).

Further conservation legislation followed, including the Countryside Act 1968, which created the Countryside Commissions, and the Wildlife and Countryside Act 1981. Nature conservation strategies since have primarily involved creating 'places for nature', such as national nature reserves and Sites of Special Scientific Interest by both the governments of the UK and NGOs.

By the 21st century, environmental protection has often been seen in Western countries as a barrier to economic growth. This is linked to the dominant, neo-liberal political thought in the UK in this period.

In 2026 a government backed study led by Forestry England identified potential areas in Northern England for the reintroduction of golden eagles, which became extinct in England in the 19th century.

== Current status ==
The loss of biodiversity in the UK has been well documented. In 2023, the Office for Environmental Protection stated England was off-track from achieving policy goals of thriving plants and wildlife.

== Legislative and policy framework ==
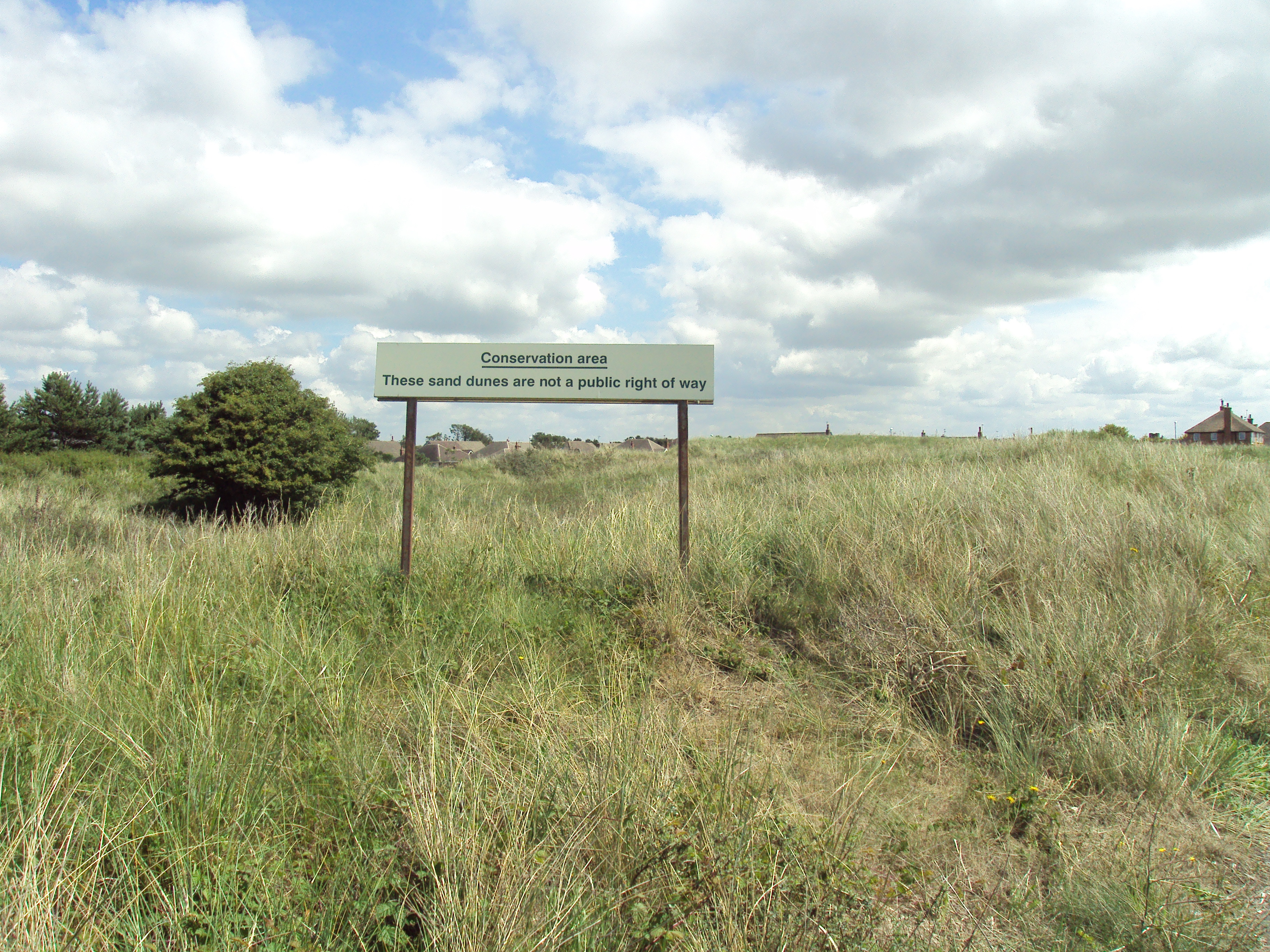
Conservation area in Lytham St Annes

Current conservation law covers not only the preservation of the environment, but also the recreation and improvement on it.

=== Nature conservation ===
British legislation on the conservation of wildlife, species and habitats can be divided into those concerned with the protection of individual species and those concerned with the protection of the habitats upon which wildlife depends.

Modern legislation has a focus on biological diversity, or biodiversity. This concept originates in the Convention on Biological Diversity of 1992 (CBD). The CBD takes the ecosystem approach, which recognises that biodiversity is dependent on natural systems, and those systems are dependent on biodiversity. It initially led to the first UK Biodiversity Action Plan (UKBAP) in 1994, which covers the period to 2014 but was superseded by Conserving Biodiversity–The UK Approach in 2007, also the revised UKBAP. The revised UKBAP included 65 priority habitats and 1,149 species.

Many of the CBD obligations have been implemented in UK law. The Natural Environment and Rural Communities Act 2006 imposes a duty on every public authority to have regard to the purpose of conserving biodiversity when exercising its functions.

=== Biodiversity net gain ===
Biodiversity net gain (BNG) is a biodiversity offsetting policy in England. New, non-exempt developments or infrastrucutre are assessed using a biodiversity metric developed by Natural England. The biodiversity metric calculates an existing and future biodiversity value of the site and development, and the BNG policy mandates that developments must achieve at least a 10% increase in biodiversity value, either within the site or by buying off-site units from biodiversity enhancement schemes. It became mandatory in 2024 following the Environment Act 2021.

=== Historic sites and the built environment ===
The primary way in which historic sites are conserved in the UK is the listed buildings system, in which designated buildings are protected from alteration or redevelopment by the planning system. This was first created by the Town and Country Planning Act 1947, but was not strictly enforced, leading to the continued loss of built heritage. Stronger planning protections came into place with the Planning Act 1968.

=== Full legislation ===
Some of the key legislation which governs conservation issues in the UK. This list is not exhaustive.

- Ancient Monuments and Archaeological Areas Act 1979
- Badgers Act 1991
- Countryside and Rights of Way Act 2000
- Environment Act 1995
- Environmental Protection Act 1990
- Environment (Wales) Act 2016
- National Parks and Access to the Countryside Act 1949
- Natural Environment and Rural Communities Act 2006
- Planning (Listed Buildings and Conservation Areas) Act 1990
- Protection of Badgers Act 1992
- Weeds Act 1959
- Wildlife and Countryside Act 1981

Other policy:

- Article 4 direction
- United Kingdom Biodiversity Action Plan (UKBAP)

== Governance ==
The National Trust is a charity preserving both natural and built sites in England, Wales and Northern Ireland. It was incorporated by Parliament through the National Trust Act 1907.

=== Nature conservation ===
The governance of the conservation of the natural environment falls into three distinct areas:

- the designation and management of protected areas
- the protection of individual species
- the development of national and sub-national conservation strategies

The governance of each are complex, with the management of land and the setting and monitoring of objectives being state-mediated, whereas in practice a large range of non-governmental bodies play a major role in managing land.

The key governmental bodies for nature conservation are legally grouped as 'the UK Conservation Bodies'. These comprise the following non-departmental public bodies:

- Natural England (formerly English Nature, the Countryside Agency and the Rural Development Service)
- Scottish Natural Heritage (formerly the Nature Conservancy Council for Scotland)
- Countryside Council for Wales (formerly Nature Conservancy Council and the Countryside Commission)
- Council for Nature Conservation and the Countryside in Northern Ireland

These bodies have a statutory duty to advise on the implementation of conservation policies in their respective regions.

=== Built heritage conservation ===
Historic England is the government body in England for conserving the historic built environment. It was created by the National Heritage Act 1983. The National Trusts of England, Wales and Northern Ireland and of Scotland conserve specific built heritage sites.

=== List of institutions governing conservation ===
==== Government departments ====
- Department for Environment, Food and Rural Affairs (DEFRA)
- Directorates of the Scottish Government: Environment and Forestry Directorate

==== Quasi-governmental bodies ====
The following are Executive Agencies of the UK government and regional executives, with note on their areas of responsibility.

- Joint Nature Conservation Committee — co-ordination of regional bodies
- Forestry Commission — co-ordinating international forestry policy support and certain plant health functions in respect of trees and forestry.

===== England =====
- Historic England — cultural and built heritage.
- Natural England — nature and wildlife conservation, landscape protection.
- Environment Agency — waterways, pollution, waste management.
- Forestry England — Forestry management

===== Scotland =====
The following are Public bodies of the Scottish Government, with notes on their areas of responsibility.

- Forestry and Land Scotland — forestry management
- Historic Environment Scotland — cultural and built heritage
- NatureScot — landscape protection, wildlife conservation
- Scottish Canals — management of inland waterways
- Scottish Environment Protection Agency (SEPA) — waterways, pollution, waste management
- Scottish Forestry — forestry regulation and support

===== Wales =====
- Cadw — cultural and built heritage
- Natural Resources Wales (NRW) (formerly Countryside Council for Wales, Forestry Commission Wales and Environment Agency Wales) — protection of landscapes and rural countryside, regulation of waterways, pollution, waste management

===== Northern Ireland =====
- Northern Ireland Environment Agency (NIEA) — conservation of natural and built heritage
- Forest Service Northern Ireland

==== Non-governmental organisations ====
- Architectural Heritage Society of Scotland
- Botanical Society of the British Isles
- British Dragonfly Society
- British Trust for Ornithology
- British Waterfowl Association
- Buglife
- Butterfly Conservation
- The Canal & River Trust, formerly British Waterways
- Cam Valley Wildlife Group
- Civic Trust
- Civic Trust for Wales
- Boards of Conservators which have been established for specific areas.
- Council for British Archaeology
- Council for the Protection of Rural England (CPRE)
- Environment Wales
- Froglife
- Historic Houses Association
- Institute of Conservation
- John Muir Trust
- Marine Conservation Society
- National Gardens Scheme
- National Trust (England, Wales, Northern Ireland)
- National Trust for Scotland
- Norfolk Conservation Corps
- North East Civic Trust
- Royal Society for the Protection of Birds (RSPB)
- Scottish Civic Trust
- Scottish Forest Alliance
- Scottish Ornithologists' Club
- Scottish Wildlife Trust
- Society for the Protection of Ancient Buildings
- The Conservation Volunteers
- The Grasslands Trust
- Trinity House
- Ulster Wildlife Trust
- The Welsh Wildlife Trusts
- Wildfowl and Wetlands Trust (WWT)
- The Wildlife Trusts partnership links to every county Wildlife Trust
- The Woodland Trust
- The Animal Project

== Conservation designations ==
=== National parks ===
- National parks

=== Areas designated by government agencies ===
The following designations are established or monitored by the executive agencies listed above.

Designation	Abbreviation	Country	Agency
Area of Outstanding Natural Beauty	AONB	England	Natural England
Area of Outstanding Natural Beauty	AONB	Wales	NRW
Area of Outstanding Natural Beauty	AONB	Northern Ireland	NIEA
Environmentally sensitive area	ESA	England	Natural England
Heritage coast		England	Natural England
Heritage coast		Wales	NRW
Marine nature reserve	MNR		
National nature reserve	NNR	England	Natural England
National nature reserve	NNR	Scotland	NatureScot
National nature reserve	NNR	Wales	NRW
National nature reserve	NNR	Northern Ireland	NIEA
National scenic area	NSA	Scotland	NatureScot
Nitrate vulnerable zone	NVZ	England	Environment Agency
Scheduled monument	SAM	England	Historic England
Scheduled monument	SAM	Scotland	Historic Environment Scotland
Scheduled monument	SAM	Wales	Cadw
Scheduled monument	SAM	Northern Ireland	NIEA
Site of Special Scientific Interest	SSSI	England	Natural England
Site of Special Scientific Interest	SSSI	Scotland	NatureScot
Site of Special Scientific Interest	SSSI	Wales	NRW
Area of Special Scientific Interest	ASSI	Northern Ireland	NIEA
Special landscape area	SLA	Wales	NRW

=== Other domestic conservation designations ===
- Area of archaeological importance (under the Ancient Monuments and Archaeological Areas Act 1979)
- Area of archaeological potential
- Conservation area
- Country park
- Listed building
- Local nature reserve
- Regional park
- Regionally important geological site

Green belts are often interpreted as conservation designations, but are in fact intended to be a planning policy to prevent urban sprawl. Green belt areas are not necessarily of high environmental or landscape quality.

=== International conservation designations ===
- Biosphere reserves
- Ramsar sites
- Special Area of Conservation (SAC)
- Special Protection Area (SPA)
  - SACs and SPAs are part of Natura 2000
- World Heritage Sites

== See also ==
- Biodiversity Action Plan
- List of Conservation topics
- Conservation in Scotland
