= Civic Trust =

Civic Trust may refer to:

- Australian Civic Trust, formerly Civic Trust of South Australia
- Civic Trust (England), now defunct; functions taken over by Civic Voice
  - Gloucester Civic Trust
  - Swindon Civic Trust
- Civic Trust for Wales, now dormant
- Scottish Civic Trust
  - Edinburgh's Civic Trust (aka Cockburn Association)

== See also ==
- Civic society
- Civic Trust Awards, UK awards
- Civic Trust Awards (Australia), Australian awards
- Civic Voice, successor to the Civic Trust in England
- Heritage Open Days
