= Conservation in Scotland =

Overview article

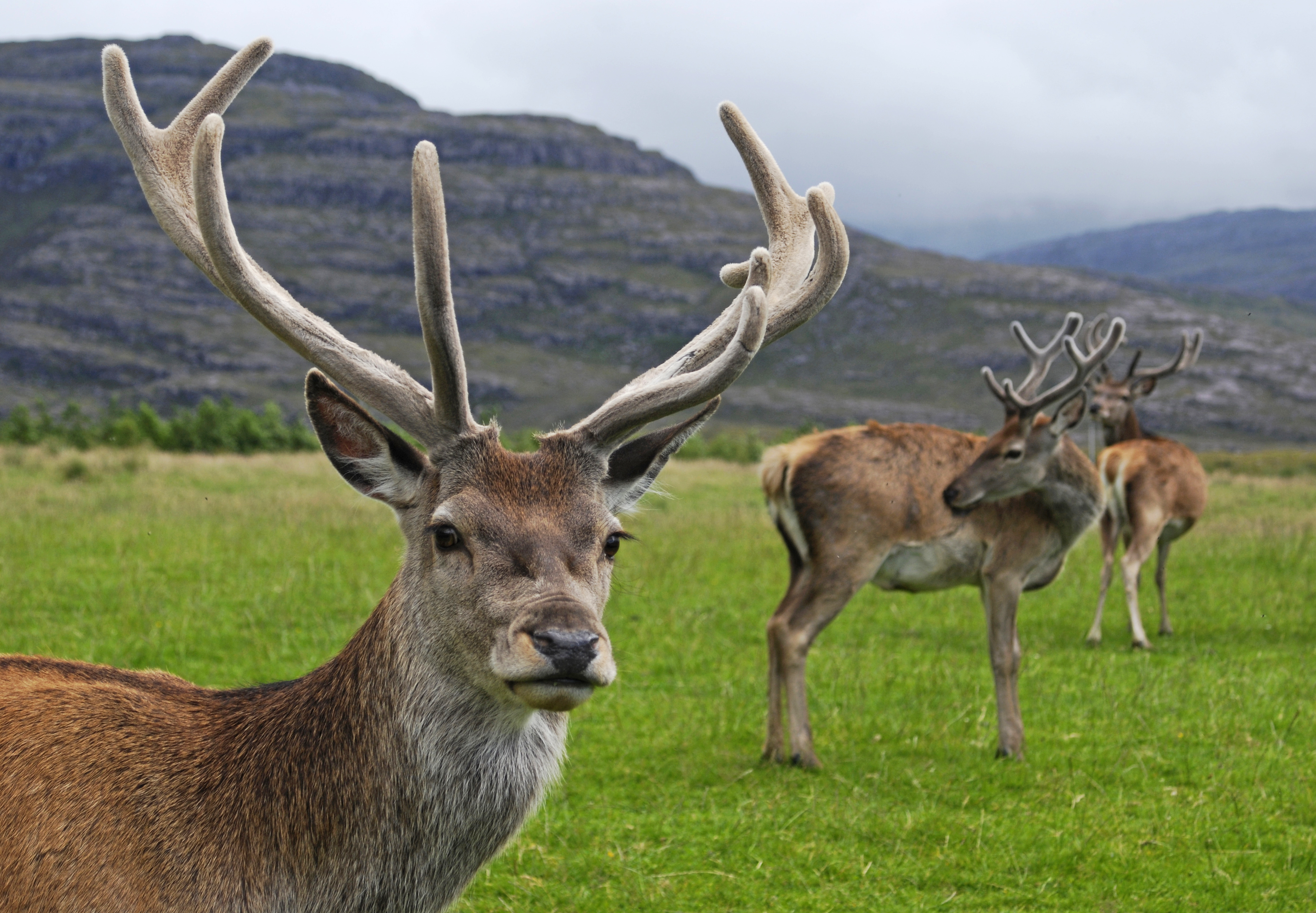
Scottish red deer stag (Cervus elaphus scoticus)

This article gives an overview of the structure of environmental and cultural conservation in Scotland, a constituent country of the United Kingdom.

Upon the introduction of devolved government the environment and built heritage were not listed as reserved issues, and so for the most part conservation is the responsibility of the Scottish Parliament, the Scottish Government, and the public bodies that report to them. Although originally reserved, responsibility for all planning and nature conservation matters at sea up to 200 miles from the Scottish coast was transferred to the Scottish Government in 2008. Some matters related to conservation, such as international treaties and border controls on prohibited species, remain the responsibility of the UK Government.

Much environment legislation in Scotland is based on the adoption into Scots law of European Union directives, such as the Habitats Directive. As such there may be changes to the structure and nature of conservation activities in Scotland following the UK's departure from the European Union.

== Scottish Government ==
=== Scottish Government directorates ===
Conservation matters are dealt with across a number of directorates of the Scottish Government:

- Environmental protection, forestry and biodiversity are the responsibility of the Environment and Forestry Directorate.
- The Marine Scotland Directorate is responsible for the integrated management of Scotland's seas.
- The Offshore Wind Directorate develops policy related to offshore renewables, marine energy, and marine planning, to support the continued growth of the offshore wind, wave and tidal sectors.
- The Energy and Climate Change Directorate covers measures to reduce greenhouse gas emissions.
- The Planning Directorate's responsibilities include addressing the climate and nature issues via planning and energy consenting.
- The conservation of cultural and historic heritage is the responsibility of the Culture and External Affairs Directorate.

=== Scottish ministers ===
Two Cabinet Secretaries hold portfolios with responsibility for conservation issues:

- The Cabinet Secretary for Climate Action and Rural Affairs has ministerial responsibility for many conservation issues, including cross-government co-ordination of Net Zero policy, climate crisis and environmental protection, biodiversity, sustainable development, flood prevention and coastal erosion, agriculture and crofting, fisheries and aquaculture, forestry in Scotland, and water quality.
- The portfolio of the Cabinet Secretary for Education, Culture and Gaelic includes ministerial responsibility for historic and cultural heritage.

=== Public bodies ===
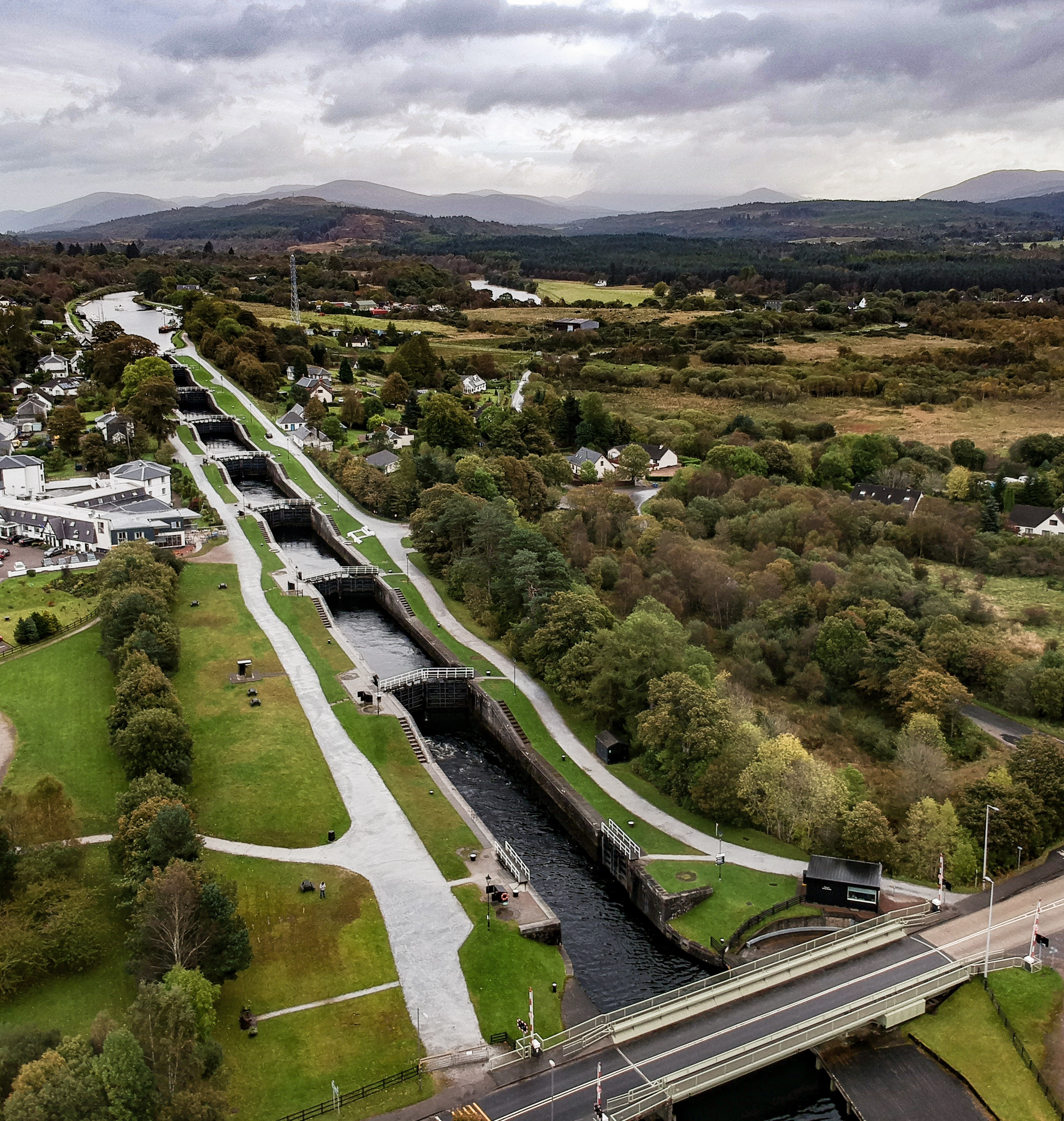
Neptune's Staircase on the Caledonian Canal is looked after by Scottish Canals.

The following are public bodies of the Scottish Government, with notes on their areas of responsibility.

==== Executive agencies ====
- Forestry and Land Scotland is responsible for management of the national forest estate.
- Scottish Forestry is responsible for forestry regulation and support.

==== Executive non-departmental public bodies ====
- Cairngorms National Park Authority
- Historic Environment Scotland is responsible for cultural and built heritage.
- Loch Lomond and the Trossachs National Park Authority
- NatureScot is responsible for landscape protection and wildlife conservation.
- The Royal Botanic Garden Edinburgh undertakes scientific study into plants and their conservation.
- Scottish Environment Protection Agency is responsible for waterways, pollution and waste management.

==== Public corporations ====
- Crown Estate Scotland is responsible for managing a range of rural, coastal and marine assets that are held 'in right of the Crown'.
- Scottish Canals manages Scotland's inland waterways.

== United Kingdom Government ==
Within the UK Government, environmental protection is the responsibility of the Department for Environment, Food and Rural Affairs (DEFRA). Two UK-wide executive agencies with responsibility for conservation matters include Scotland within their remit:

- The Joint Nature Conservation Committee (JNCC) co-ordinates the work of the UK's nature conservation bodies (SNH being the Scottish body).
- The Forestry Commission co-ordinates international forestry policy support and certain plant health functions in respect of trees and forestry.

== Non-governmental organisations ==
Many non-governmental organisations are active in conservation issues in Scotland. The following list provides some examples.

- Action to Protect Rural Scotland (APRS)
- Architectural Heritage Society of Scotland
- Botanical Society of the British Isles
- British Dragonfly Society
- Buglife
- Butterfly Conservation
- Cockburn Association
- Council for British Archaeology
- Historic Churches Scotland
- Institute of Conservation
- John Muir Trust
- Marine Conservation Society
- National Trust for Scotland
- Plantlife
- Royal Scottish Forestry Society
- Royal Society for the Protection of Birds (RSPB Scotland)
- Royal Zoological Society of Scotland
- Scottish Civic Trust
- Scottish Ornithologists' Club
- Scottish Wildcat Association
- Scottish Wildlife Trust
- Society for the Protection of Ancient Buildings
- Trees for Life
- Wildfowl and Wetlands Trust (WWT)
- The Woodland Trust

== Protected areas ==
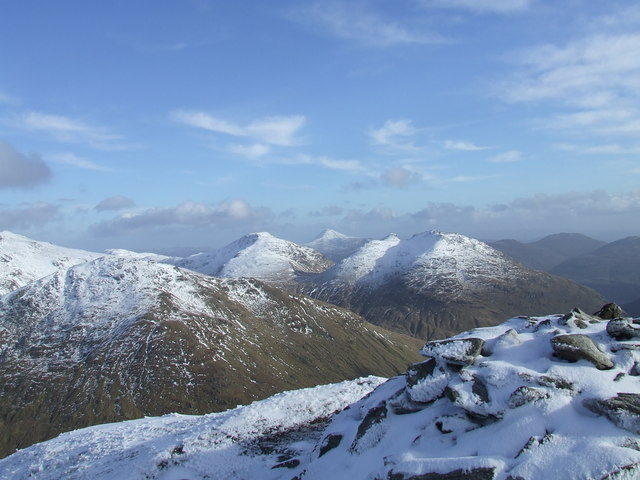
Ben Lomond and the Arrochar Alps in the Loch Lomond and the Trossachs National Park

=== National environmental designations ===
- National parks — National parks of Scotland
- National nature reserves
- National scenic areas
- Sites of Special Scientific Interest (SSSI) — Lists of Sites of Special Scientific Interest in Scotland
- Nature Conservation Marine Protected Areas (MPA)

=== National designations for historic and cultural sites ===
- Scheduled monuments
- Listed buildings — Listed buildings in Scotland
- Inventory of Gardens and Designed Landscapes in Scotland
- Inventory of Historic Battlefields in Scotland
- Historic Marine Protected Areas

=== International designations ===
- World Heritage Sites — List of World Heritage Sites in Scotland
- Ramsar sites — List of Ramsar sites in Scotland
- Natura 2000
  - Special Areas of Conservation — List of Special Areas of Conservation in Scotland
  - Special Protection Areas —List of Special Protection Areas in Scotland

=== Local designations ===
- Local nature reserves
- Conservation areas
- Regional parks

=== Non-statutory protected areas ===
- Forest parks of Scotland

== Objects of conservation ==
- Abbeys and priories in Scotland
- Castles in Scotland
- Caledonian Forest
- Fauna of Scotland
- Flora of Scotland
- Gardens in Scotland
- Historic houses in Scotland
- Lighthouses in Scotland
- National Trust for Scotland
- Scotland's Great Trails - long-distance trails

== See also ==
- Biodiversity Action Plan
- List of Conservation topics
- Article 4 direction
- United Kingdom Biodiversity Action Plan (UKBAP)
- Conservation in the United Kingdom
