= Civic society =

Civic society may refer to:

- Civil society, the third sector of society distinct from government and business
- An entity that is a member of the Civic Voice in England, formerly the Civic Trust (England)

== See also ==
- Civic engagement
- Civic Trust
- Civic virtue
- Civics
- Civility
- Community league, the equivalent in parts of Canada
- Birmingham Civic Society
- Bourne Civic Society
- Nottingham Civic Society
