= Beeston Civic Society =

Beeston and District Civic Society
- Formation: 1973
- Registration no.: 503241
- Legal status: Charity
- Purpose: Civic Heritage
- Location: Beeston, Nottinghamshire
- Region served: Beeston, Nottinghamshire

Beeston and District Civic Society is a civic society based in the Beeston, Nottinghamshire, England.

== History ==
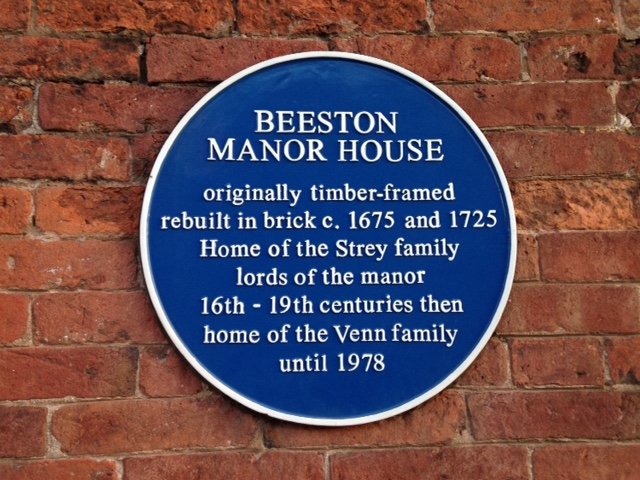
An example of the Blue Plaques in Beeston installed with the Southern Broxtowe Blue Plaque Group

The society was founded in 1973 and aims to care for Beeston, especially with respect to its historic buildings, heritage and urban environment. The society is involved in supporting planning applications perceived to be beneficial and promoting improvement of public spaces and local amenities. The society is a registered charity (503241).

The society has worked with the Southern Broxtowe Blue Plaque Group in the installation of Blue Plaques in the district. As part of its Golden Anniversary celebrations in 2023, the group began working with Broxtowe Borough Council to create a Local Heritage List. It also initiated a project to recognise women who had made a significant contribution to the district.

== See also ==
- Civic Trust
- Nottingham Civic Society
