= Civic Trust (England) =

Defunct English charity

The Civic Trust
- Industry: Built Environment Charity
- Founded: 1957; 69 years ago
- Founder: Duncan Sandys
- Defunct: 2009
- Successor: Civic Voice and Civic Trust Awards
- Area served: England

The Civic Trust of England was a charitable organisation founded in 1957. It ceased operations in 2009 and went into administration due to lack of funds.

The Civic Society Initiative was set up in 2009 with the support of the National Trust, CPRE and other organisations to ensure a future for the civic society movement and was formally launched in April 2010 as Civic Voice.

== Original function ==
Civic Trust's prime purpose was to improve the quality of new and historic buildings and public spaces, and to help improve the general quality of urban life. The trust operated from two main offices, in London and Liverpool and supported a national network of civic societies. These were local groups in which volunteer members helped to improve their surroundings. It ran the Civic Trust Regeneration Unit, which supported urban renewal through programmes addressing issues of concern such as "the night time economy". It ran campaigns to influence and change thinking on civic matters, and change government policy. It helped establish conservation areas and coordinate Heritage Open Days.

== Civic Trust Awards ==
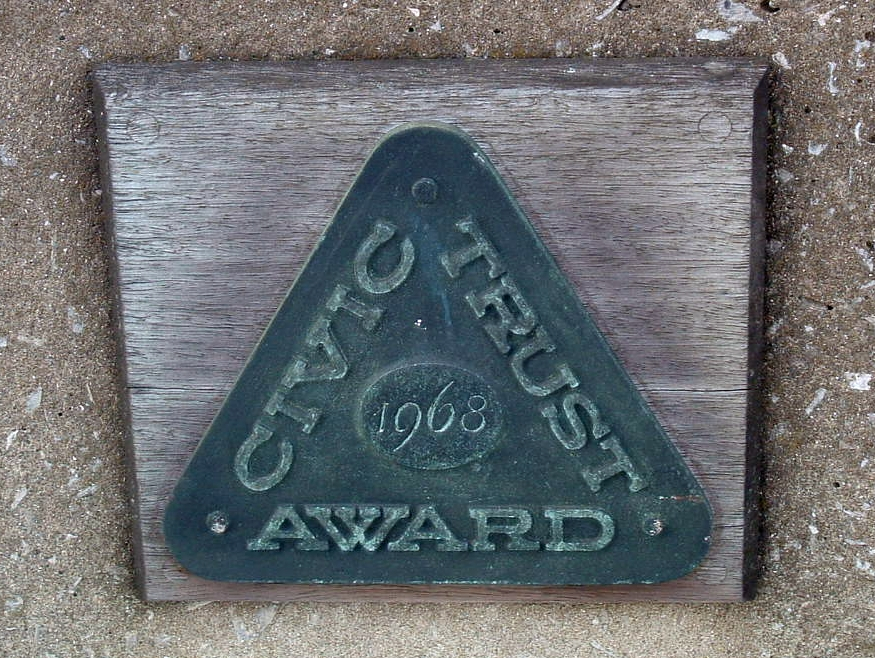
Civic Trust Award plaque on the Severn Bridge.

The Civic Trust Awards was established in 1959 to recognise outstanding architecture, urban design, landscape and public are which improve the quality of life for local communities. Whilst the Civic Trust as an umbrella organisation went into administration in April 2009, the Civic Trust Awards have continued as an independent scheme operating on a not-for-profit basis as a community interest company.

== See also ==
- Civic Trust for Wales
- Scottish Civic Trust
- Cockburn Association (Edinburgh Civic Trust)
- Birmingham Civic Society
- Bourne Civic Society
- Leeds Civic Trust
- Nottingham Civic Society
- Swindon Civic Trust
- Coventry Society
- Category:Recipients of Civic Trust Awards
