= Basil Robinson =

Basil Robinson may refer to:

- Basil Robinson (RAF officer) (1912–1943), pilot with RAF Bomber Command during World War II
- Basil Robinson (cricketer) (1919–2012), Canadian cricketer
- Basil William Robinson, British art scholar and author
