= Players Bonded Warehouses (Nottingham) =

Coordinates: 52.95464°N 1.18742°W

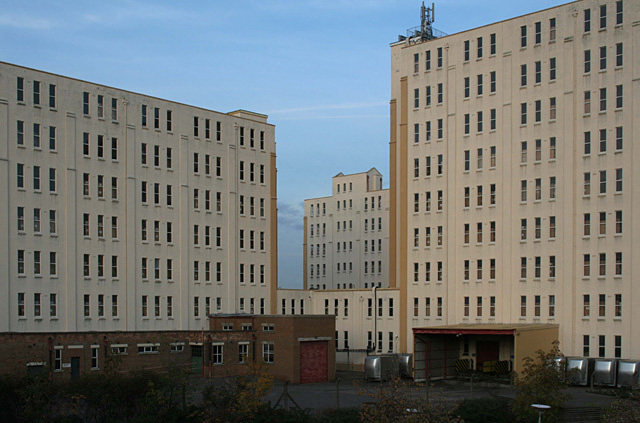
Tobacco warehouses, Radford, Nottingham - geograph.org.uk - 448754

Players Bonded Warehouses are a major former group of warehouses in Nottingham which were used by John Player & Sons for the bonded storage of tobacco. The buildings were completed in 1939, and were in use until operations ceased in 2016. The site was purchased by the University of Nottingham, with demolition beginning in summer 2017. During their existence buildings were a major landmark in west Nottingham, forming "a "gateway" on the west side of the city".

== Buildings ==
The site, situated at the junction of Wollaton and Triumph Roads in Radford, comprised a group of three 7-9 storey warehouses for the storage of up to 20,000 tonnes of leaf tobacco, interlinked as a "T" with a lower block of offices and loading bays, South of this were other brick buildings, some of which pre-dated the warehouse construction.

The warehouses were designed and built by the William Cowlin & Son, a Bristol firm of builders, and closely followed the design of the same firm's tobacco warehouses in Bristol, for Wills Tobacco, another company in the Imperial Tobacco group. The buildings had a complete frame of reinforced concrete, using the system invented by Louis Mouchel, consisting of 6 by 6 bays and 7 or 9 storeys high. Non-structural infill was of brick. The design and materials used were important as leaf tobacco is readily combustible.

== Demolition and future use of site ==
The site was earmarked for incorporation into the University of Nottingham's Jubilee Campus in the Nottingham City Council 2007 strategic plan for the area. The site, including buildings, was acquired by the University in 2016, who plan to build a 280-room hall of residence named Xenia, after the Greek concept of hospitality.

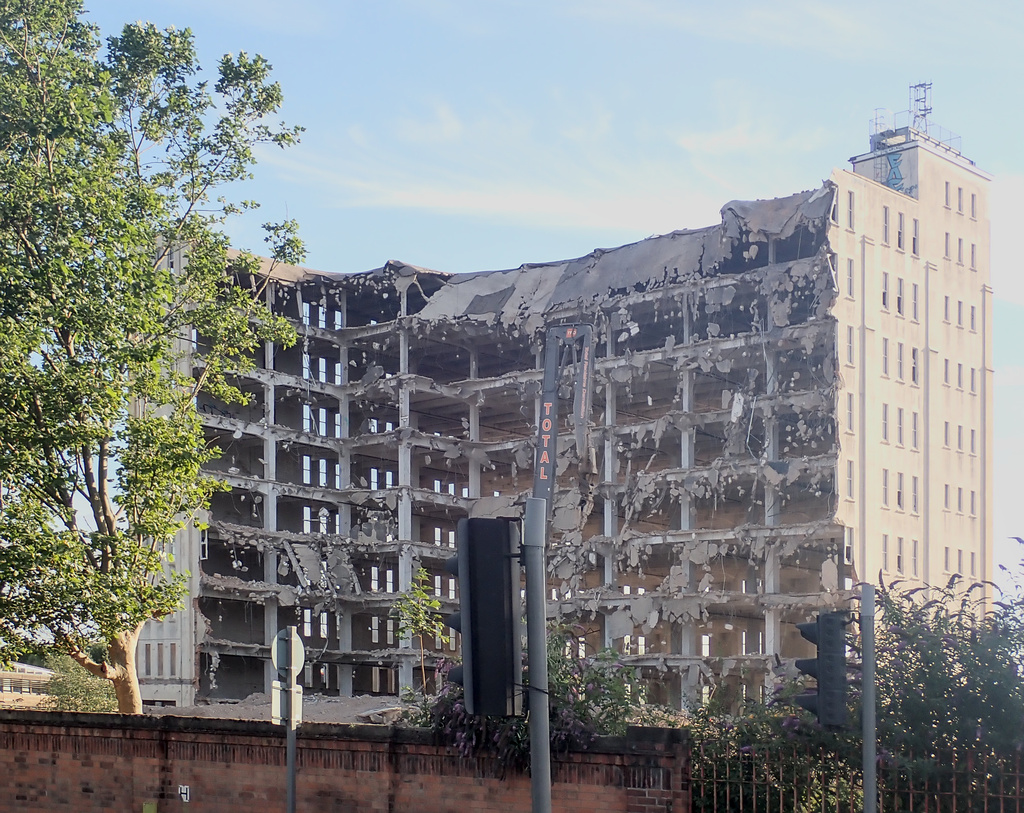
Final demolition of Players Bonded Warehouses (geograph 7228418)

Despite appeals during 2016 by the 20th Century Society and Nottingham Civic Society, the buildings were not listed by English Heritage. Demolition commenced with an earlier building on the south side of the site in 2016. The demolition of the main group of buildings started on 15 June 2017, but excluded the central building. The final demolition of this latter building started in July 2022, following a planning application. Demolition is expected to be completed in September 2022.
