= Lekwa Local Municipality elections =

The Lekwa Local Municipality is a Local Municipality in Mpumalanga, South Africa. The council consists of thirty members elected by mixed-member proportional representation. Fifteen councillors are elected by first-past-the-post voting in fifteen wards, while the remaining fifteen are chosen from party lists so that the total number of party representatives is proportional to the number of votes received. In the election of 1 November 2021 the African National Congress (ANC) lost its majority, winning thirteen seats.

== Results ==
The following table shows the composition of the council after past elections.

Event	ANC	DA	EFF	FF+	Other	Total
2000 election	21	4	—	0	2	27
2006 election	21	4	—	1	1	27
2011 election	23	6	—	0	1	30
2016 election	20	5	2	0	3	30
2021 election	13	4	3	3	7	30

== December 2000 election ==
The following table shows the results of the 2000 election.

Party	Ward			List			Total seats
Party	Votes	%	Seats	Votes	%	Seats	Total seats
African National Congress	13,515	71.37	12	15,003	76.29	9	21
Democratic Alliance	2,703	14.27	2	3,040	15.46	2	4
Inkatha Freedom Party	957	5.05	0	1,066	5.42	2	2
Independent candidates	1,761	9.30	0				0
Freedom Front Plus				556	2.83	0	0
Total	18,936	100.00	14	19,665	100.00	13	27
Valid votes	18,936	96.38		19,665	95.77		
Invalid/blank votes	712	3.62		868	4.23		
Total votes	19,648	100.00		20,533	100.00		
Registered voters/turnout	42,810	45.90		42,810	47.96		

== March 2006 election ==
The following table shows the results of the 2006 election.

Party	Ward			List			Total seats
Party	Votes	%	Seats	Votes	%	Seats	Total seats
African National Congress	16,825	76.63	11	16,980	77.36	10	21
Democratic Alliance	2,969	13.52	3	2,952	13.45	1	4
United Democratic Movement	627	2.86	0	663	3.02	1	1
Freedom Front Plus	409	1.86	0	399	1.82	1	1
Pan Africanist Congress of Azania	419	1.91	0	355	1.62	0	0
Inkatha Freedom Party	344	1.57	0	320	1.46	0	0
African Christian Democratic Party	265	1.21	0	279	1.27	0	0
Independent candidates	97	0.44	0				0
Total	21,955	100.00	14	21,948	100.00	13	27
Valid votes	21,955	97.71		21,948	97.50		
Invalid/blank votes	515	2.29		563	2.50		
Total votes	22,470	100.00		22,511	100.00		
Registered voters/turnout	46,336	48.49		46,336	48.58		

== May 2011 election ==
The following table shows the results of the 2011 election.

Party	Ward			List			Total seats
Party	Votes	%	Seats	Votes	%	Seats	Total seats
African National Congress	22,118	76.80	12	22,485	77.84	11	23
Democratic Alliance	5,293	18.38	3	5,253	18.18	3	6
Pan Africanist Congress of Azania	816	2.83	0	614	2.13	1	1
Freedom Front Plus	430	1.49	0	295	1.02	0	0
National Freedom Party	103	0.36	0	162	0.56	0	0
United Democratic Movement	38	0.13	0	78	0.27	0	0
Total	28,798	100.00	15	28,887	100.00	15	30
Valid votes	28,798	97.82		28,887	98.11		
Invalid/blank votes	642	2.18		556	1.89		
Total votes	29,440	100.00		29,443	100.00		
Registered voters/turnout	49,204	59.83		49,204	59.84		

== August 2016 election ==
The following table shows the results of the 2016 election.

Party	Ward			List			Total seats
Party	Votes	%	Seats	Votes	%	Seats	Total seats
African National Congress	19,553	65.42	12	19,663	65.90	8	20
Democratic Alliance	4,913	16.44	3	4,864	16.30	2	5
Civic Voice	3,047	10.19	0	2,869	9.62	3	3
Economic Freedom Fighters	1,531	5.12	0	1,537	5.15	2	2
Freedom Front Plus	477	1.60	0	478	1.60	0	0
Pan Africanist Congress of Azania	216	0.72	0	203	0.68	0	0
African People's Convention	149	0.50	0	179	0.60	0	0
Sindawonye Progressive Party	3	0.01	0	45	0.15	0	0
Total	29,889	100.00	15	29,838	100.00	15	30
Valid votes	29,889	97.79		29,838	97.57		
Invalid/blank votes	676	2.21		742	2.43		
Total votes	30,565	100.00		30,580	100.00		
Registered voters/turnout	53,249	57.40		53,249	57.43		

== November 2021 election ==
The following table shows the results of the 2021 election.

Party	Ward			List			Total seats
Party	Votes	%	Seats	Votes	%	Seats	Total seats
African National Congress	9,739	42.47	12	9,568	41.59	1	13
Lekwa Community Forum	4,251	18.54	0	4,674	20.32	6	6
Democratic Alliance	3,069	13.38	1	3,068	13.34	3	4
Economic Freedom Fighters	2,148	9.37	0	2,069	8.99	3	3
Freedom Front Plus	2,063	9.00	2	2,094	9.10	1	3
African Transformation Movement	432	1.88	0	430	1.87	1	1
Civic Voice	341	1.49	0	300	1.30	0	0
Pan Africanist Congress of Azania	202	0.88	0	234	1.02	0	0
Inkatha Freedom Party	173	0.75	0	201	0.87	0	0
Patriotic Alliance	179	0.78	0	160	0.70	0	0
African Christian Democratic Party	132	0.58	0	164	0.71	0	0
Independent candidates	161	0.70	0				0
Disability and Older Person Political Party	39	0.17	0	45	0.20	0	0
Total	22,929	100.00	15	23,007	100.00	15	30
Valid votes	22,929	98.04		23,007	98.04		
Invalid/blank votes	458	1.96		460	1.96		
Total votes	23,387	100.00		23,467	100.00		
Registered voters/turnout	51,116	45.75		51,116	45.91		

Following the election, in which the African National Congress lost its majority for the first time, resulting in one of three hung councils in Mpumalanga, candidates from the Lekwa Community Forum were elected to the mayorship and speaker positions, while the Economic Freedom Fighters won the chief whip position.

=== By-elections from November 2021 ===
The following by-elections were held to fill vacant ward seats in the period since November 2021.

Date	Ward	Party of the previous councillor	Party of the newly elected councillor
25 October 2023	4	Freedom Front Plus	Independent politician
