= Herbert Manzoni =

British civil engineer (1899–1972)

Sir Herbert Manzoni CBE MICE
- Born: 21 March 1899; Birkenhead, England
- Died: 18 November 1972 (aged 73); Edgbaston, England
- Spouse: Liliam M. Davis
- Engineering career
- Discipline: Civil
- Institutions: Institution of Civil Engineers (president), Town Planning Institute (member), Royal Society of Health (fellow), Institution of Municipal Engineers (president), Birmingham University (governor), British Standards Institution (president), Federation of Master Builders (national president), Civil Engineering Research Association (chairman), Civic Trust (trustee)
- Projects: Queensway, Birmingham
- Awards: CBE (1941), Knight Bachelor (1954)

Sir Herbert John Baptista Manzoni CBE MICE (21 March 1899 – 18 November 1972) was a British civil engineer and surveyor known for holding the position of City Engineer and Surveyor of Birmingham from 1935 until 1963. This position put him in charge of all municipal works and his influence on the city, especially following World War II, resulted in the wholesale destruction of Birmingham's magnificent Victorian and Georgian architecture, and completely changed the image of the city of Birmingham.

Among the most notable buildings destroyed as part of Manzoni's redevelopment of Birmingham and the creation of the inner ring road were Pugin's Bishop's House, the Victorian Central Library designed by J. H. Chamberlain, the Gothic Revivalist-style Mason Science College, Birmingham Market Hall, the Central Technical College, and the Suffolk Street Technical College, among others.

Though he was knighted and respected in his time for his work redeveloping Birmingham, later reception, particularly among architectural conservationists, has been much more critical. Other criticism has focused on the alleged negative impact of this redevelopment on working class and ethnic minority communities in Birmingham through its focus on privately-owned cars and high-density high-rise accommodation. Nevertheless, some credit him with improving the zoning and layout of the city and bringing it into the 20th century.

== Life ==
Manzoni was born in Birkenhead, the son of a Milanese sculptor, and was educated both in Birkenhead and Liverpool. He moved to Birmingham in 1923 and became an engineering assistant in the Sewers and Rivers Department. He became Chief Engineer for the department four years later. Unlike many other cities, planning and architectural issues came largely under the control of the city's Chief Engineer.

In 1935, Herbert Humphries retired from his post as City Surveyor and Manzoni took over the post at the age of 36. In 1941, Manzoni anticipated the damage that would be caused by the Birmingham Blitz and, in October 1941, announced the creation of four advisory panels within the council to focus upon Housing, Traffic, Redevelopment Areas and Limitation of the city. A 1938 report identified that there was a serious housing shortage that still needed to be addressed in Birmingham. Manzoni launched a citywide slum clearance scheme, and replaced the housing with high density schemes consisting of tower blocks.

He used the Town and Country Planning Act 1944 (to which he contributed) to designate redevelopment areas in Birmingham. Manzoni took advantage of the Housing Act of 1936 to designate 267 acres (1.08 km^{2}) of land in Duddeston and Nechells as a redevelopment area. This was approved in 1950. The first tower blocks to be built in the area were completed in 1954 and the entire scheme was completed in 1972. He also designated a further four in Newtown, Ladywood, Lee Bank, and Highgate, totalling around 1,400 acres (5.7 km^{2}). Together, they contained nearly 250,000 houses that were considered unfit for habitation and they were one half of the entire slum property in the city. The houses were purchased by the council using Compulsory Purchase Orders.

Manzoni encouraged zoning of areas and redevelopment. He did not believe in the preservation of old buildings and regarded their retention as being for sentimental rather than valuable purposes. This was shown in his work which resulted in the loss of many old buildings and historic areas of the city. His attitudes became the orthodoxy and directly or indirectly led to the demolition of a number of much loved landmarks, such as the old Birmingham Central Library and the walls of the original Birmingham Market Hall (its roof having been lost during WWII).

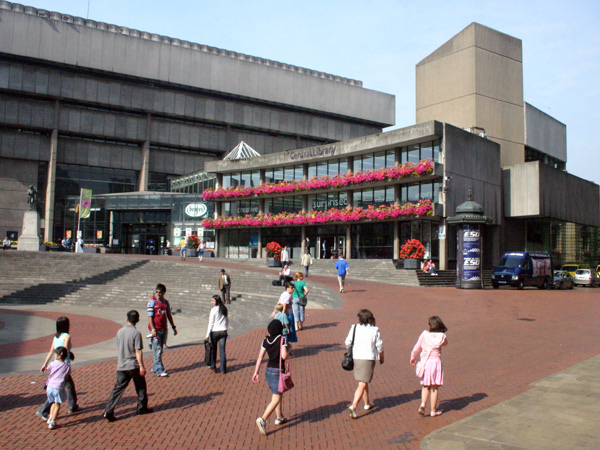
The controversial 1974 Birmingham Central Library (now demolished) by John Madin Design Group which replaced a Victorian building on an adjacent site.

Manzoni's most famous utterance on the city's architecture neatly encapsulates his attitudes:

I have never been very certain as to the value of tangible links with the past. They are often more sentimental than valuable... As to Birmingham’s buildings, there is little of real worth in our architecture. Its replacement should be an improvement... As for future generations, I think they will be better occupied in applying their thoughts and energies to forging ahead, rather than looking backward.

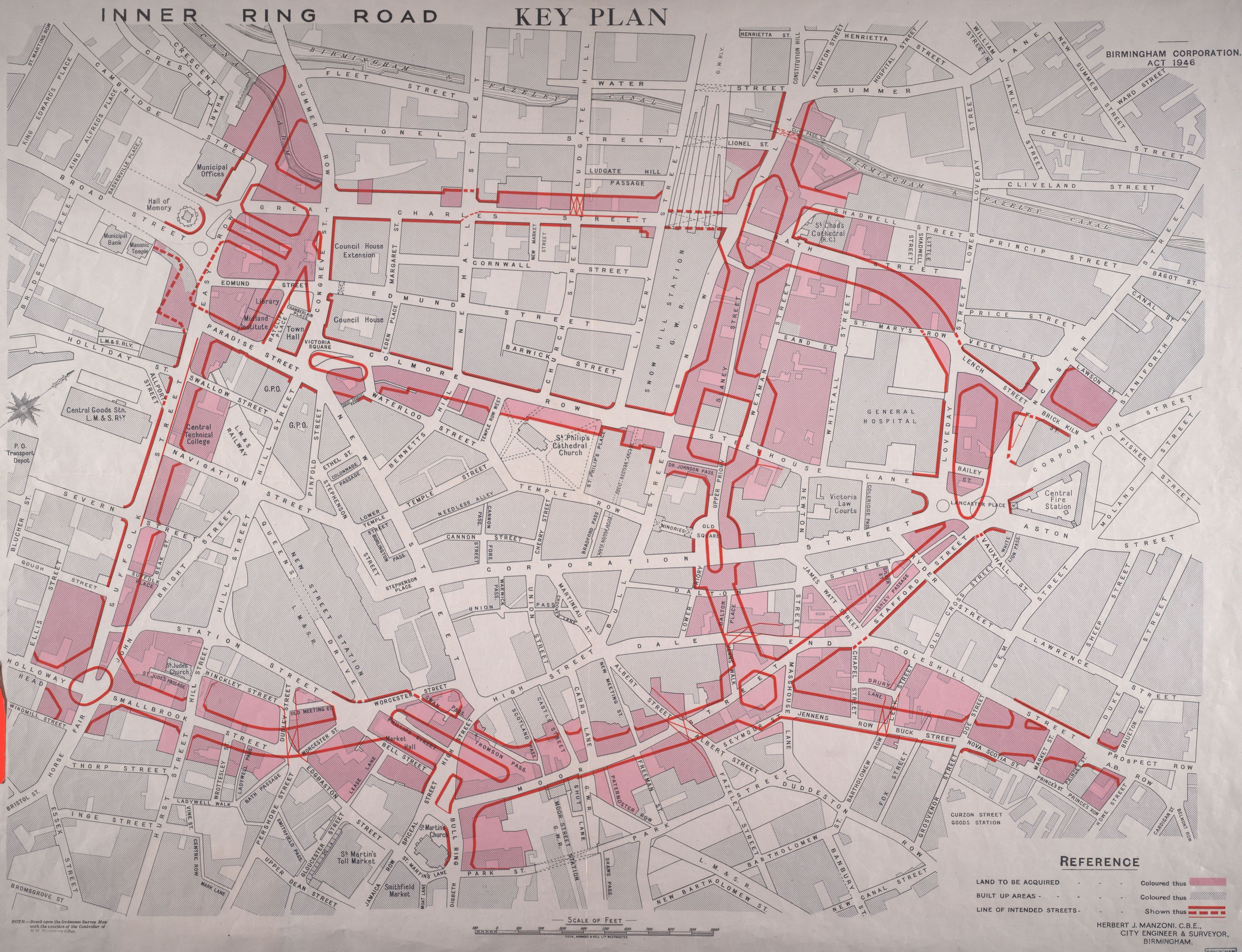
Manzoni's plan for Birmingham's inner ring road, from the Birmingham Corporation Inner Ring Road Key Plan (1946). This was largely built as proposed, albeit without the central axis along Colmore Row.

An urban motorway system was also launched by Manzoni. This had been advocated by William Haywood in his 1918 book, The Development of Birmingham. Manzoni began planning an Inner Ring Road from 1943, and an Act of Parliament was passed in 1946 allowing construction to commence. The first section, Smallbrook Queensway, was not started until 1957 and was completed in 1960. The entire ring road was opened by Queen Elizabeth II in 1971, however in error she named the whole ring road instead of just one part of it, Queensway. Demolition of Masshouse Circus on the ring road began in March 2002 and further sections were demolished or demoted following it. The construction of the Inner Ring Road had resulted in the demolition of the remains of the Market Hall at the Bull Ring, the Central Library, Mason Science College and the Central Technical College. A Middle Ring Road was constructed following this, cutting through the Jewellery Quarter, and an Outer Ring Road was also designated. Following the demolition of parts of the Inner Ring Road, Birmingham City Centre is now considered to be the area within the Middle Ring Road. According to urban designer Nick Corbett, planners started realising from the 1980s that the Queensway "was stifling growth as well as having a rather brutal appearance."

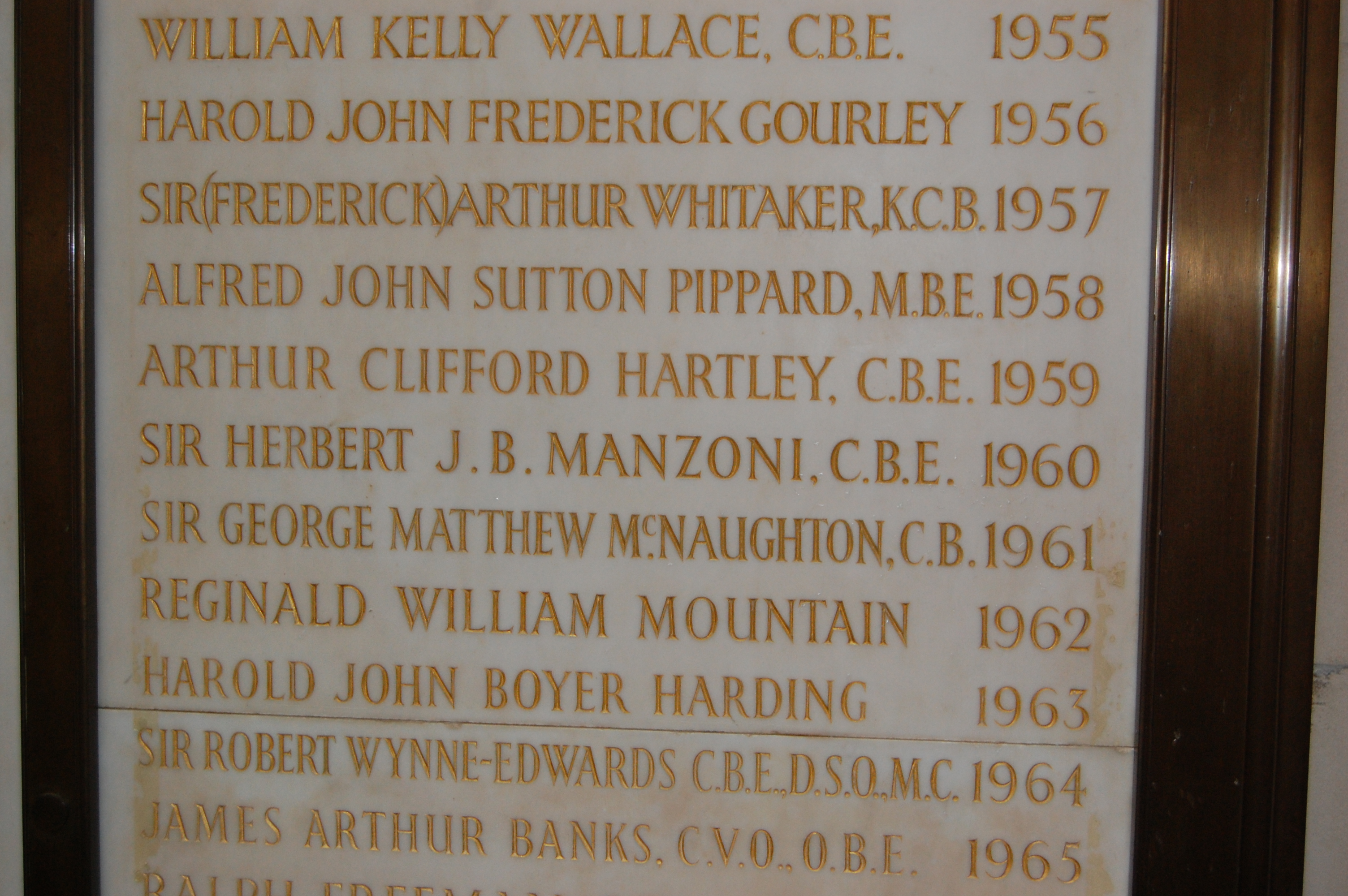
Manzoni's name on the list of Institution of Civil Engineers presidents, at their One Great George Street headquarters

In February 1960, Manzoni was elected president of the Institution of Civil Engineers, a position he served in for 21 months instead of the customary year-long tenure due to the untimely death of his predecessor Arthur Hartley.

Manzoni retired from Birmingham in 1963 to Herefordshire, but soon returned to the city of Birmingham. He died of cancer at the Queen Elizabeth Hospital, Edgbaston, on 18 November 1972.

Professional and academic associations
Preceded by Arthur Hartley	President of the Institution of Civil Engineers; February 1960 – November 1961	Succeeded by George Matthew McNaughton
Academic offices
Preceded by Sir Edward Herbert	Chair of Governors of Loughborough College; 1963–1966	Succeeded by University created, similar role held by Lord Pilkington
