= Fog Investigation and Dispersal Operation =

System used for fog dispersion

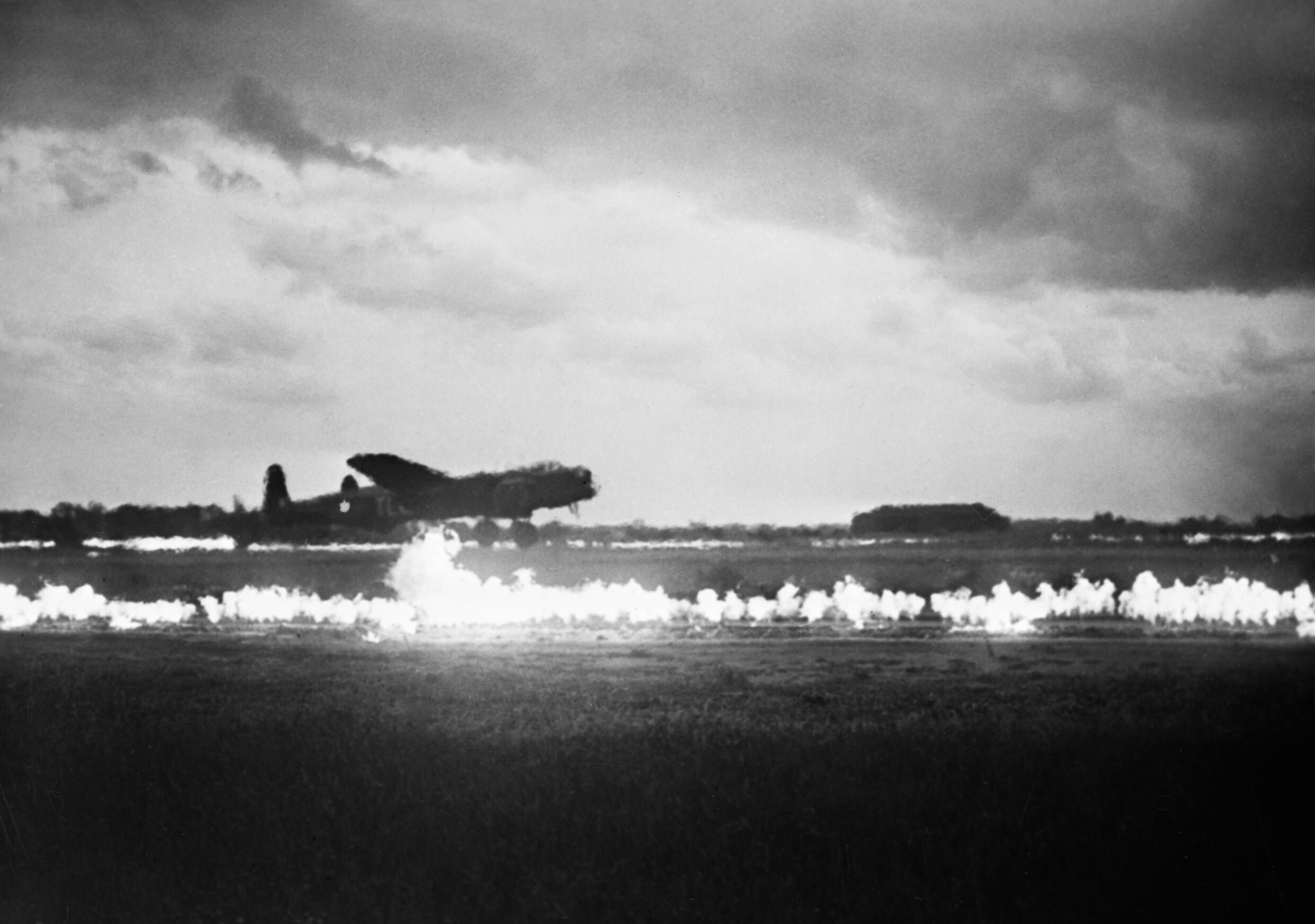
FIDO in operation at RAF Graveley, May 1945

Fog Investigation and Dispersal Operation (FIDO) (which was sometimes referred to as "Fog Intense Dispersal Operation" or "Fog, Intense Dispersal Of" (Note: Fog Investigation Dispersal Operations was the initial name during testing and Fog Intensive Dispersal Of was used once the process was operationalized.)) was a system used for dispersing fog and pea soup fog (dense smog) from an airfield so that aircraft could land safely. The device was developed by Arthur Hartley for British RAF bomber stations, allowing the landing of aircraft returning from raids over Germany in poor visibility by burning fuel in rows on either side of the runway.

The FIDO system was developed at the department of chemical engineering of the University of Birmingham, United Kingdom, during the Second World War. The invention of FIDO is formally attributed to Dr John David Main-Smith, an ex-Birmingham resident and principal scientific officer of the Chemistry Department of the Royal Aircraft Establishment at Farnborough, Hampshire, and as a courtesy the joint-patent (595,907) held by the Ministry of Supply was shared by the department head Dr Ramsbottom as was normal practice at the time. This formal government recognition is enshrined in an Air Ministry postwar letter to the late inventor's late widow and held by his son, Bruce Main-Smith (February 2008). It also deals with the lesser role of those developing support equipment, notably the FIDO burner.

"It is my memory", writes Bruce Main-Smith, "that much of the airfield installation was pioneered at Hartford Bridge Flats airfield (aka Blackbushe near Yateley, Surrey [sic]) a convenient few miles from the RAE's Farnborough aerodrome." Though J. D. Main-Smith co-owned the FIDO patent, no royalties accrued from any UK civilian usage after World War II, its being too petrol-hungry. At an attempt to quantify the saving of aircrew life, Bruce Main-Smith suggests possibly 11,000 airmen but not all would be fit to fly again.

It is difficult for the modern (2008) UK resident to comprehend what World War II fogs were like. It was not uncommon for a person to be unable to see the hand at the end of an outstretched arm. The post-war Clean Air Act hugely ameliorated UK fogs.

— B. Main-Smith

== System ==
The device consisted of two pipelines situated along both sides of the runway (one pipeline each side of the runway) and through which a fuel (usually the petrol from the airfield's own fuel dump) was pumped along and then out through burner jets positioned at intervals along the pipelines. The vapours were lit from a series of burners, producing walls of flame. The FIDO installation usually stored its fuel in four circular upright tanks built at the edge of the airfield with a low brick bund wall in case of leakage. The tanks were usually encased in ordinary brickwork as protection from bomb splinters or cannon fire.

When fog prevented returning Allied aircraft from locating and seeing their runways to land, they would be diverted to FIDO equipped aerodromes. RAF night bombers which were damaged on their missions were also diverted to FIDO airfields due to the need to make certain they could land when they arrived. When FIDO was needed, the fuel pumps were started to pour flammable liquid into the pipe system and a Jeep with a flaming brand lashed to its rear drove fast down both sides of the runway to ignite the fuel at the outlets in the pipes. The burners were sometimes ignited by men on bicycles or by runners on foot. The result was a row of flame along the side of the runway that would warm the air. The heat from the flames evaporated suspended fog droplets so that there would be a clearing in the fog directly over the runway. This allowed the pilot to see the ground as he attempted to put his aircraft down. Once landed, the planes would be moved off and dispersed to hard stands. The next day the planes would be repaired if needed, refueled and flown back to their home base.

== Procedure for aircrew before introduction ==
Before the introduction of FIDO, fog had been responsible for losses of a number of aircraft returning from operations. Often large areas of the UK would be simultaneously fog-bound and it was recommended procedure in these situations for the pilot to point the aircraft towards the sea and then, while still over land, for the crew to bail-out by parachute, leaving the aircraft to subsequently crash in the sea. With raids often consisting of several hundred aircraft, this could amount to a large loss of bombers.

== Testing ==
An experimental FIDO system was first tested at Moody Down, Hampshire, on 4 November 1942 and 200 yards of dense fog was successfully cleared to a height of 80 feet. The first full scale FIDO system was installed in January 1943 and an aircraft reportedly piloted by Air Vice Marshal D. C. T. Bennet successfully landed between the flames, although not in fog conditions.

The first successful flights in fog occurred on 17 July 1943 when an Airspeed Oxford of RAF No 35 Squadron piloted by Flying Officer (later Flight Lieutenant) Edward Noel Holding (RNZAF Number 402185) carried out three approaches and departures in dense fog with Group Captain Basil Robinson. Robinson was killed on operations a month later. Holding survived the war and died in Auckland, New Zealand, in 2008.

== Use ==
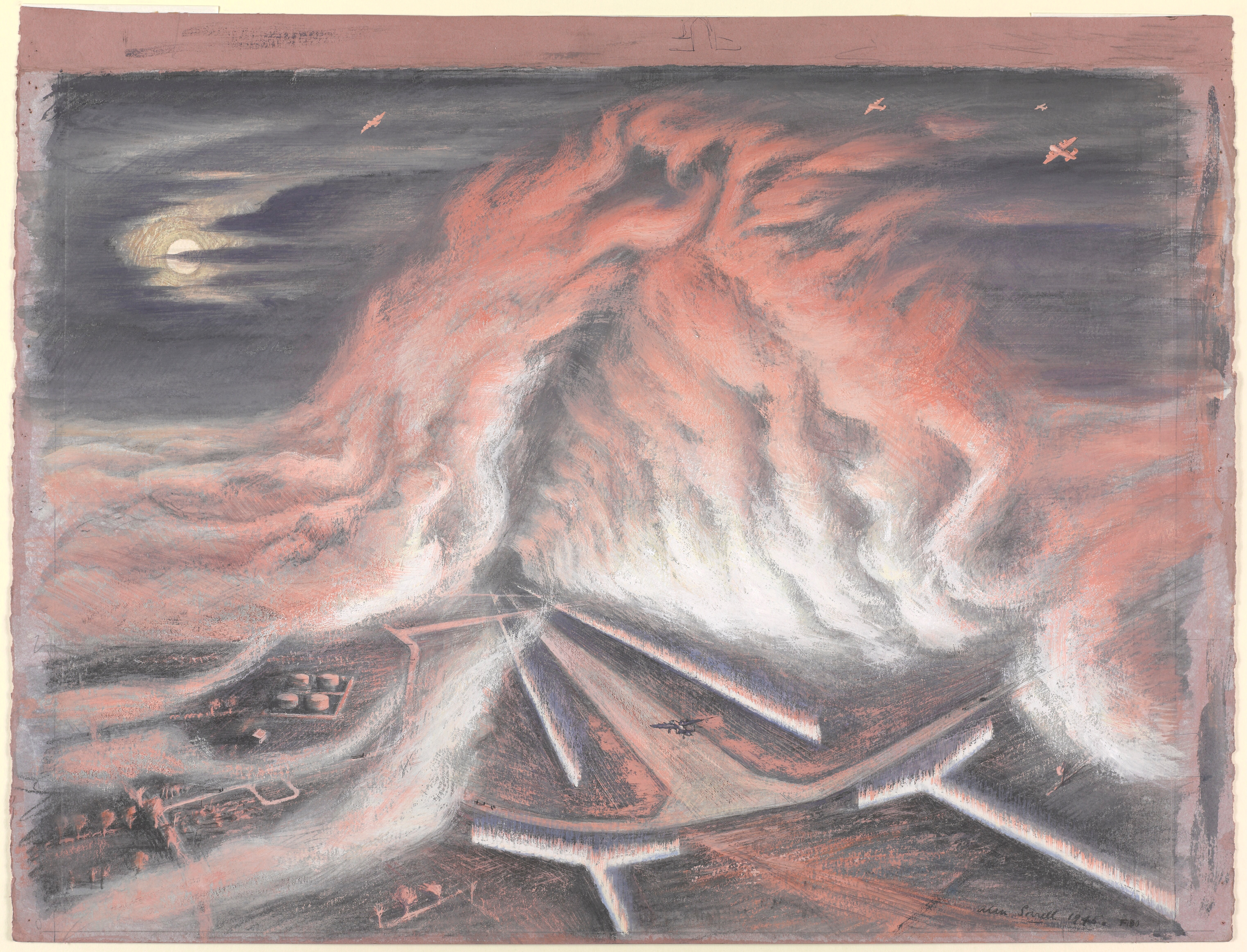
FIDO in Operation, 1945 (Art.IWM ART LD 5593), Alan Sorrell, Imperial War Museum

FIDO used huge quantities of fuel, as much as 100,000 imperial gallons (120,000 US gal; 450,000 L) per hour. Over twice this amount was used by airfields with longer runways such as RAF Carnaby. Large fuel storage tanks filled with low-grade petrol and possibly kerosene and other fuel were connected by pumps to provide this fuel to the runway pipes. Although extravagant in the use of fuel consumed, it was felt that the device more than made up for the operating costs involved with the reduction of aircraft losses.

FIDO systems were used at many RAF stations in England during World War II.

The last FIDO-equipped airfield at which a system was maintained was RAF Manston, the system being available for emergency use as late as 1952. Due to the high costs involved, use had to be reported to the Air Minister.

Initial installation of FIDO was designed and constructed along Runway 1 at London Heathrow Airport but the pipes and other fittings were never installed.

FIDO was also installed at North American airfields including Arcata, California, Eareckson Air Station, Naval Air Station Whidbey Island, at the World War II Amchitka Army Airfield on Amchitka Island in the Aleutians.

== Applications ==
=== RAF ===
- RAF Hartford Bridge (Hampshire - renamed Blackbushe on 30 September 1944)
- RAF Bradwell Bay (Essex - the only FIDO system laid out to recover aircraft from a South-Westerly direction - ie, landing to the North-East)
- RAF Carnaby (Yorkshire) - Emergency Landing Ground
- RAF Downham Market (Norfolk)
- RAF Fiskerton (Lincolnshire)
- RAF Foulsham (Norfolk)
- RAF Graveley (Cambridgeshire)
- RAF Ludford Magna (Lincolnshire)
- RAF Manston (Kent) - Emergency Landing Ground
- RAF Melbourne (Yorkshire)
- RAF Metheringham (Lincolnshire)
- RAF St Eval (Cornwall)
- RAF Sturgate (Lincolnshire)
- RAF Tuddenham (Suffolk)
- RAF Woodbridge (Suffolk) – Emergency Landing Ground

=== International ===
- Épinoy - France
- Arcata-Eureka Airport - California, US
- Eareckson Air Station - Shemya, Aleutian Islands, Alaska, US
- Naval Air Station Whidbey Island - Washington, US
- Amchitka Army Airfield - Amchitka, Rat Islands, Aleutian Islands, Alaska, US

== Gallery ==
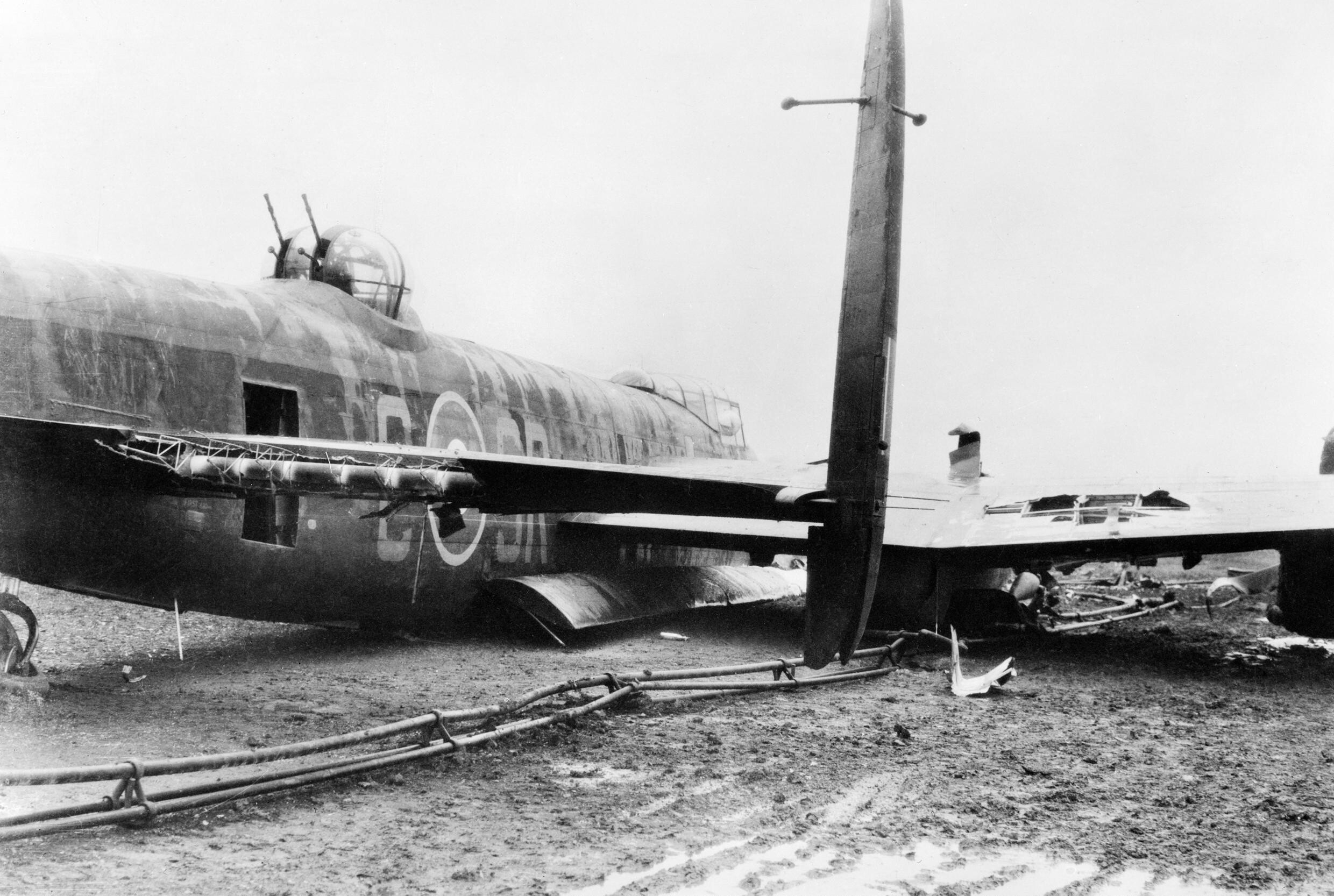
A crashed RAF bomber which damaged FIDO pipelines and burners upon crashing

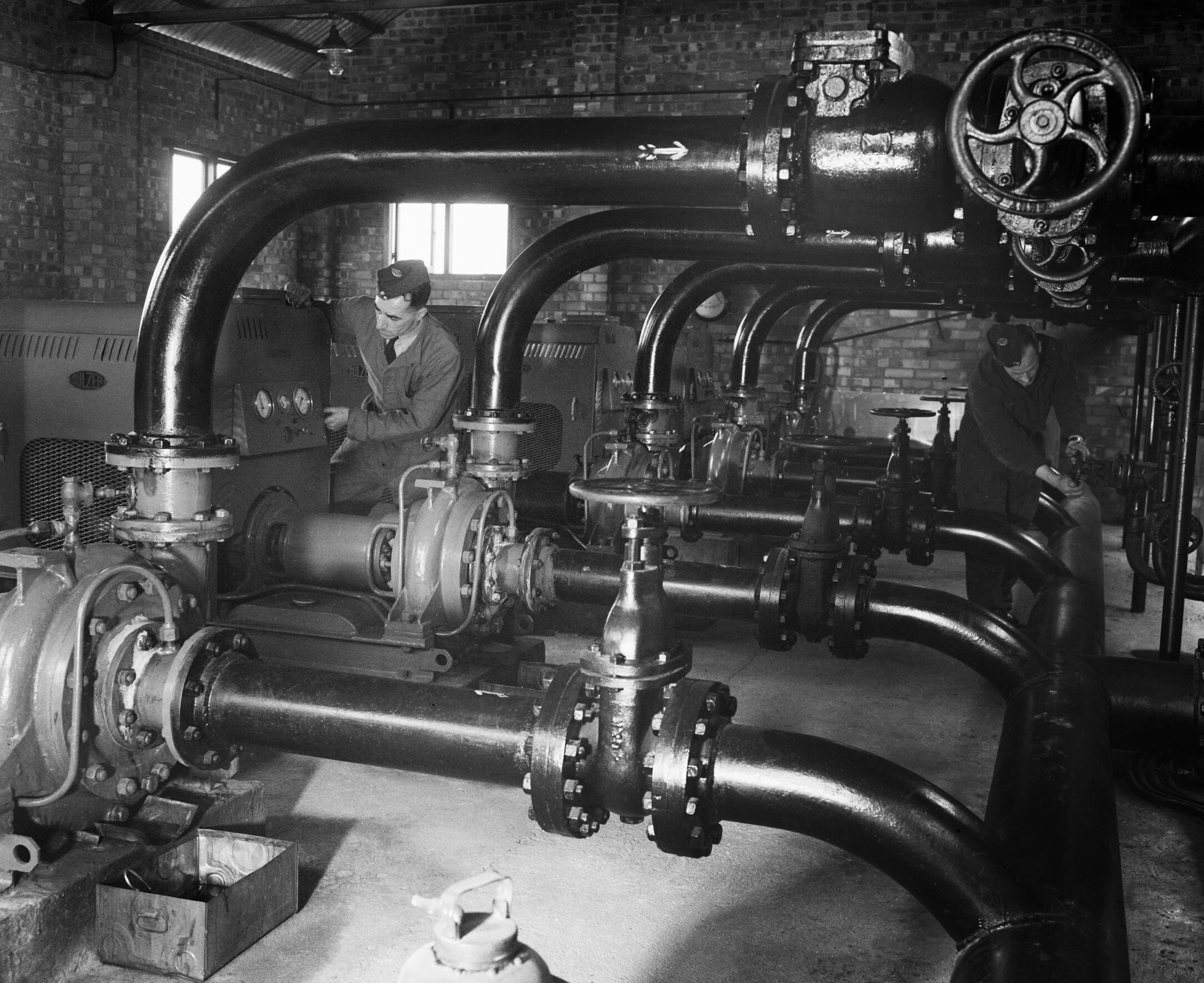
FIDO petrol feed pumps installed at RAF Graveley
