= Coventry Society =

Civic society in Coventry, England

- Coventry Society Logo
- Formation: 1970
- Type: Civic society
- Legal status: Charity
- Location: Coventry, England
- Website: www.coventrysociety.org.uk

The Coventry Society is a voluntary body and is the civic society for the city of Coventry, England. It was founded in 1970, as the Coventry Civic Amenities Society, in opposition to the proposed demolition of Kirby House.

The society is registered as a charity in England, number 500229, and is affiliated to Civic Voice, the national umbrella group for civic societies.

The society has involved itself in campaigns on issues such as the creation of new works of public art, and the preservation and conservation of historic buildings.
