= Local heritage list =

Local listing process for England below the NHLE

A local heritage list (sometimes referred to as a local list) (Note: Some local planning authorities may use different terminology for their local heritage list, such as a 'List of Buildings of Townscape Merit' or 'New Town Heritage Register', however the concept remains the same.) is register of heritage assets identified as being of importance to the local community. Such lists exist in England and Wales.

== History ==
The number of local heritage lists in England has grown over the last few decades. In 2018, the charity Civic Voice launched a campaign in support of local heritage lists, providing a Local Heritage Listing Toolkit (no longer available online) to help local community groups to get involved in developing local lists. A 2020 local heritage listing campaign led by the Ministry of Housing, Communities and Local Government (MHCLG) has also acted as a catalyst, providing funding for a number of local planning authorities to develop new lists or revise outdated ones. In 2025 Historic England published a research report into the current picture of local heritage lists in England, including the responses of a survey of local planning authorities, an evaluation of the 2020 MHCLG campaign and a historical summary of the development of local heritage lists.

== Significance in planning ==
Assets included on local heritage lists are classed as non-designated heritage assets (NDHAs) within the planning system. The planning practice guidance for England defines NDHAs as:

Non-designated heritage assets are buildings, monuments, sites, places, areas or landscapes identified by plan-making bodies as having a degree of heritage significance meriting consideration in planning decisions but which do not meet the criteria for designated heritage assets. A substantial majority of buildings have little or no heritage significance and thus do not constitute heritage assets. Only a minority have enough heritage significance to merit identification as non-designated heritage assets.

Local heritage listing is recognised in the National Planning Policy Framework as a way of recording heritage assets identified as having local significance. The relative significance of such assets can then be taken into account when making planning decisions.

Local heritage listing differs from statutory designations included on the National Heritage List for England, and for development control there is no separate consenting regime (as opposed to listed building consent or scheduled monument consent).

== List creation and maintenance ==
Local heritage lists are usually maintained by the relevant local planning authority, often with input from community organisations such as civic societies and other interested local groups. There is often a process of public nomination, and in this way local heritage lists can be considered to take a democratic approach to the identification and celebration of heritage.

Research conducted by Historic England estimates that around 70% of local planning authorities in England have one or more local heritage list, although some of these may be out-of-date. In addition, some local heritage lists cover only part or parts of a local planning authority area, for instance because they were developed as part of a neighbourhood plan or because the boundaries of the local authority have changed.

There are other ways of identifying NDHAs, including through decision making on planning applications, through developing neighbourhood plans, and in the process of designating conservation areas.
