= Architectural Heritage =

- Discipline: Architecture
- Language: English

Publication details
- History: 1990–present
- Publisher: Edinburgh University Press (United Kingdom)
- Frequency: Annually

Standard abbreviations
- ISO 4: Archit. Herit.

Indexing
- ISSN: 1350-7524 (print); 1755-1641 (web)

Links
- Journal homepage; Architectural Heritage Society of Scotland Homepage

Architectural Heritage is an academic journal published by Edinburgh University Press on behalf of the Architectural Heritage Society of Scotland in November each year. It was founded in 1991. The journal focuses on architectural history and conservation articles covering all periods of building up to and including the recent past as well as book reviews and review essays. It is the only peer-reviewed publication on architectural heritage research in Scotland.
