= Arthur Hartley =

British civil engineer (1889–1960)

- Born: 7 January 1889; Kingston upon Hull, East Riding of Yorkshire
- Died: 28 January 1960 (aged 71); St Thomas's Hospital, London,
- Education: City and Guilds College
- Spouse(s): Dorothy Wallace and Florence Hodgson
- Children: four sons
- Engineering career
- Discipline: Civil
- Institutions: Institution of Civil Engineers (president), Institution of Mechanical Engineers (president); City and Guilds of London Institute (honorary fellow)
- Projects: FIDO, Operation Pluto
- Awards: Medal of Freedom

Arthur Clifford Hartley, CBE (7 January 1889 – 28 January 1960) was a British civil engineer. Graduating with a bachelor's degree from Imperial College London, Hartley worked for the North Eastern Railway and an asphalt manufacturer before joining the Royal Flying Corps during World War I. He became a qualified pilot, with the rank of major and joined the Air Board where he was involved with the development of interrupter gear. His war work was rewarded with his appointment as an Officer of the Order of the British Empire (OBE). He left the corps after the war and spent five years as a consulting engineer before he joined the Anglo-Persian Oil Company (later Anglo-Iranian).

During the Second World War Hartley was seconded to the government where he was involved in the development of the bombsight which sank the Tirpitz, the Operation Pluto pipeline project and the FIDO fog dispersion system. Following the war he was rewarded with an appointment as Commander of the Order of the British Empire (CBE), a United States Medal of Freedom and £9000 cash. He retired from Anglo-Iranian in 1951 and was elected president of the Institution of Mechanical Engineers. He was elected president of the Institution of Civil Engineers in 1959, but died three months into his tenure.

== Early life ==
Hartley was born at Springbank, Hull on 7 January 1889 to George Thomas Hartley, a surgeon, and his wife Elizabeth Briggs. He was educated at Hymers College and Hull Municipal Technical College before attending the City and Guilds College, the engineering department of Imperial College London. He graduated with a third class honours bachelor's degree in engineering in 1910. After graduation he found employment with the North Eastern Railway in the office of their chief docks engineer at Hull and from 1912 to 1914 with asphalt makers Rose, Down and Thompson Limited.

== First World War ==
During the First World War Hartley was commissioned into the Royal Flying Corps as a second lieutenant on 23 August 1916, and became a qualified pilot. He was promoted lieutenant on 22 February 1918. He ended the war with the rank of major. During the war Hartley joined the armaments section of the Air Board, working with Bertram Hopkinson. He was responsible for the Air Board's development of George Constantinescu's interrupter gear which allowed a machine gun to be fired through the propeller blades of an aircraft without danger of damage. This invention was said by Air Vice Marshal Sir John Maitland to be responsible for air superiority over German aircraft. He transferred to the Royal Air Force on its establishment as a separate service. He was appointed an Officer of the Order of the British Empire (OBE) on 10 October 1919 in recognition of his war work.

== Inter War Period ==
After the war Hartley worked as a consulting engineer for five years before joining the Anglo-Persian Oil Company in 1924 as assistant manager of its engineering division. He became assistant manager of the supply department later the same year and from 1932 to 1934 he was seconded to the Iraq Petroleum Company, on his return being appointed chief engineer. The company became the Anglo-Iranian Oil Company in 1935.

== Second World War ==
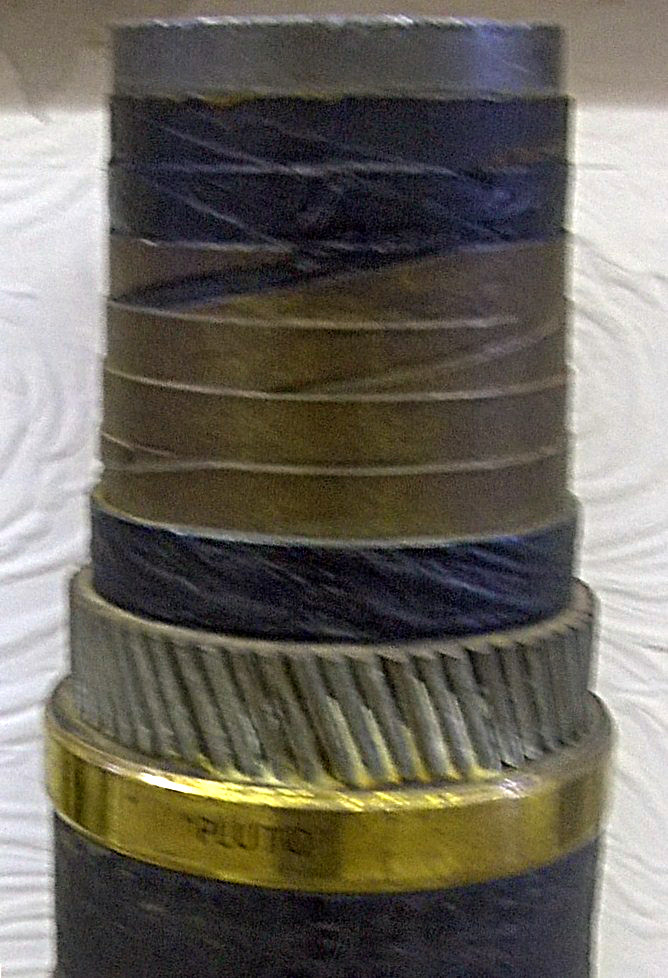
A section of PLUTO pipeline

Following the outbreak of the Second World War Hartley was seconded from Anglo-Iranian to the Ministry of Aircraft Production in 1940. From 1940 to 1941 he assisted with the development of a stabilized bombsight which was used by RAF Bomber Command in the sinking of the German battleship Tirpitz in 1944. From 1942 Hartley worked with the Petroleum Warfare Department and was appointed as its technical director. Here he developed, at the request of Air Chief Marshal Arthur Harris, the Fog Investigation and Dispersal Operation which was known as FIDO. This was a means of burning oil along runways to disperse fog. The system was installed at fifteen airfields across Britain, beginning in 1943. FIDO is credited with bringing 2,500 aircraft and 10,000 aircrew safely home during the war.

Hartley also developed the pipes used in Operation Pluto (Pipe Lines Under The Ocean), a series of twenty-one undersea pipes used to transport oil from Britain to continental Europe to support the Liberation of Europe. The system supplied the allied armies with 1 million US gallons (3,800 m^{3}) of fuel per day during the advance into Germany, and Hartley received £9000 after the war for his work on Pluto from the Royal Commission on Awards to Inventors. He also received an appointment as Commander of the Order of the British Empire (CBE) in 1944.

== Post-war ==
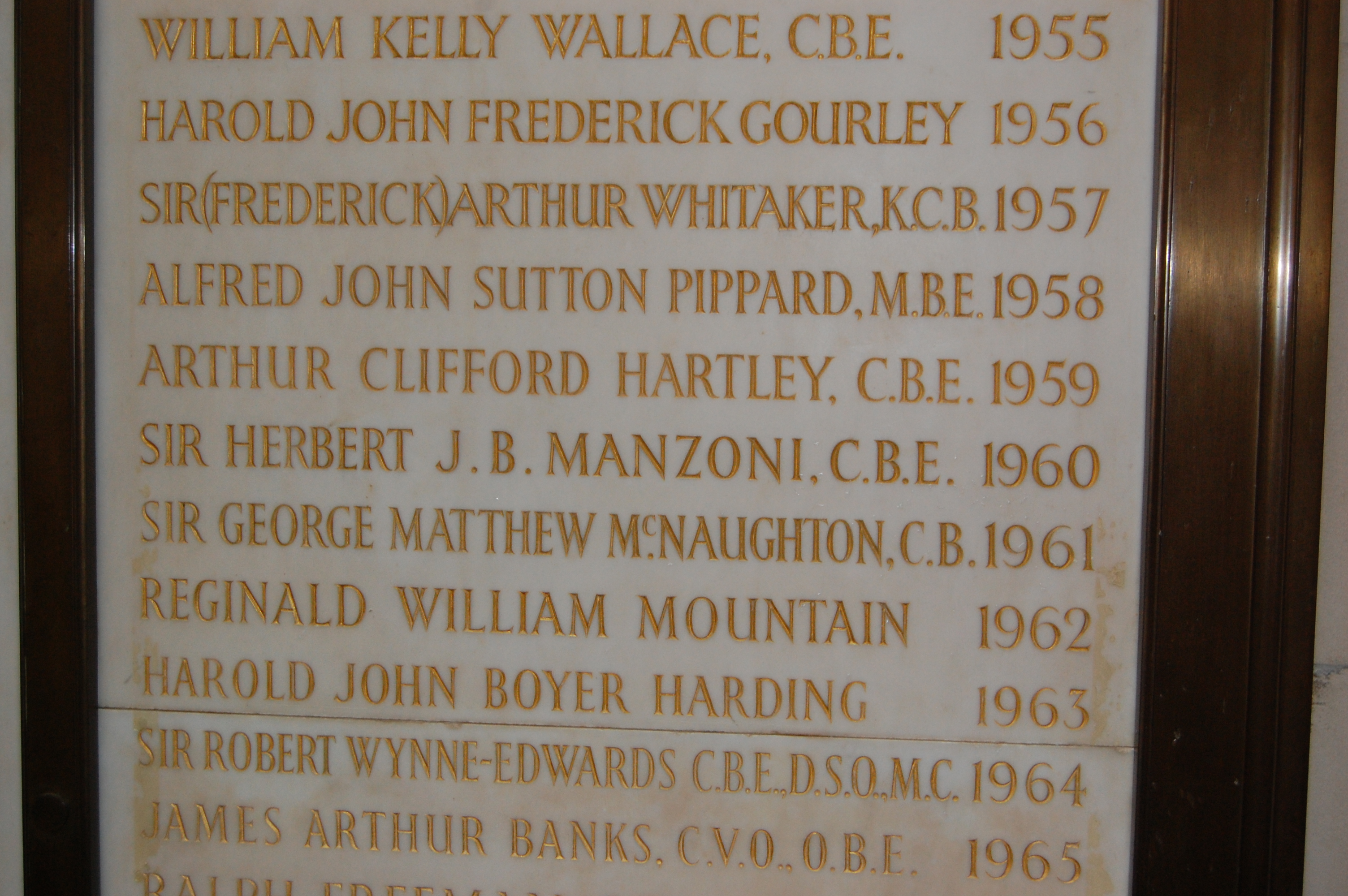
Hartley's name on the list of Institution of Civil Engineers presidents, at their One Great George Street headquarters

Hartley was awarded the United States Medal of Freedom in 1946. He retired from Anglo-Iranian (which would become BP in 1954) in 1951 and became an engineering consultant during which time he developed the Hartley hoister – a device which allowed the loading of oil tankers offshore. He was elected president of the Institution of Mechanical Engineers in 1951 and was an honorary fellow of the City and Guilds of London Institute. He was also made an honorary fellow of Imperial College London in 1953. In 1959 he received the Redwood Medal of the Institute of Petroleum. He was elected president of the Institution of Civil Engineers in 1959. However he died just three months into his term at St Thomas's Hospital, London on 28 January 1960.

== Personal life ==
Hartley married Dorothy Elizabeth Wallace, the daughter of a Shanghai-based marine engineer, in 1920 and had two sons. Dorothy died in 1923, and in 1927 he married Florence Nina Hodgson with whom he had a further two sons.

Professional and academic associations
Preceded by Stanley Fabes Dorey	President of the Institution of Mechanical Engineers; 1951	Succeeded by Sir David Randall Pye
Preceded by Alfred Pippard	President of the Institution of Civil Engineers; November 1959 – February 1960	Succeeded by Herbert Manzoni
