= RAF Carnaby =

Royal Air Force base in Yorkshire, England

RAF Carnaby
- Near Carnaby, East Riding of Yorkshire in England

Site information
- Type: Emergency Diversion Runway
- Code: KQ
- Owner: Ministry of Defence
- Operator: Royal Air Force
- Controlled by: RAF Bomber Command * No. 4 Group RAF

Location
- Shown within East Riding of Yorkshire RAF Carnaby (the United Kingdom)
- Coordinates: 54°03′39″N 000°15′42″W

Site history
- Built: 1943/44
- Built by: John Laing & Son Ltd
- In use: March 1944 – 1945; 1959 – 1963
- Battles/wars: European theatre of World War II; Cold War

Airfield information
- Elevation: 35 feet (11 m) AMSL
Runways
Direction	Length and surface
09/27	2,700 metres (8,858 ft) Bitumen and sea sand

Royal Air Force Carnaby or more simply RAF Carnaby is a former Royal Air Force emergency landing strip that offered crippled bombers a safe place to land near the English coast during the Second World War. It was situated 2 miles (3.2 km) south-west of Bridlington, East Riding of Yorkshire, England.

== History ==
RAF Carnaby opened in March 1944 under the control of No. 4 Group Royal Air Force. Unlike most RAF airfields, there was a single runway, five times the width of a standard runway and 9,000 ft (2,700 m) long, lying approximately east-west to enable bombers crossing the coast an easier landing. Two similar airfields were either constructed or further developed along the east coast of England, at Manston and Woodbridge, all three providing an emergency option for wartime bomber crews. The three airfields were developed to the same pattern, Woodbridge being the first to open in November 1943. The runway at Manston was brought into operation in April 1944.

These airfields were intended for use by returning bombers suffering from low fuel and/or suspected damage to their pneumatic (wheel brake) and/or hydraulic (undercarriage) systems. All three airfields were equipped with one runway, 9,000 ft (2,700 m) long and 750 ft (230 m) wide. There was a further clear area of 1,500 ft (460 m) at each end of the runway. At each of the three airfields, the runway was divided into three 250 ft (76 m) lanes. The northern and central lanes were allocated by flying control, while the southern lane was the emergency lane on which any aircraft could land without first making contact with the airfield. Over 1,400 bombers made an emergency landing at Carnaby by the end of the war.

Air Chief Marshal Basil Embry in Mission Completed believed that the three emergency runways were constructed as a result of the success of the 3 mi (4.8 km)-long landing strip and flarepath at RAF Wittering in accepting over 70 damaged aircraft from Bomber Command. The runway had been lengthened in 1940 to reduce landing accidents to Bristol Beaufighter night fighters returning at night and in bad weather.

=== Fog Investigation and Dispersal Operation ===
Carnaby was one of fifteen airfields operating the fog dispersal system known as Fog Investigation and Dispersal Operation (FIDO). The system consisted of two rows of pipes emitting burning petrol, one on each side of the runway; the heat from this fire raised the air temperature above the runways, cutting a hole in the fog and providing crews with a brightly lit strip indicating the position of the runway.

== Post Second World War ==
The station closed in 1946 but was re-activated in 1953 due to the need to train pilots for the Korean War. The airfield was used as a Relief Landing Ground for No. 203 Squadron (then based at RAF Driffield) but closure to flying came soon after in 1954.

RAF Carnaby was a PGM-17 Thor missile base from 1959 to 1963 controlled by No. 150 Squadron RAF.

== Post-RAF history ==
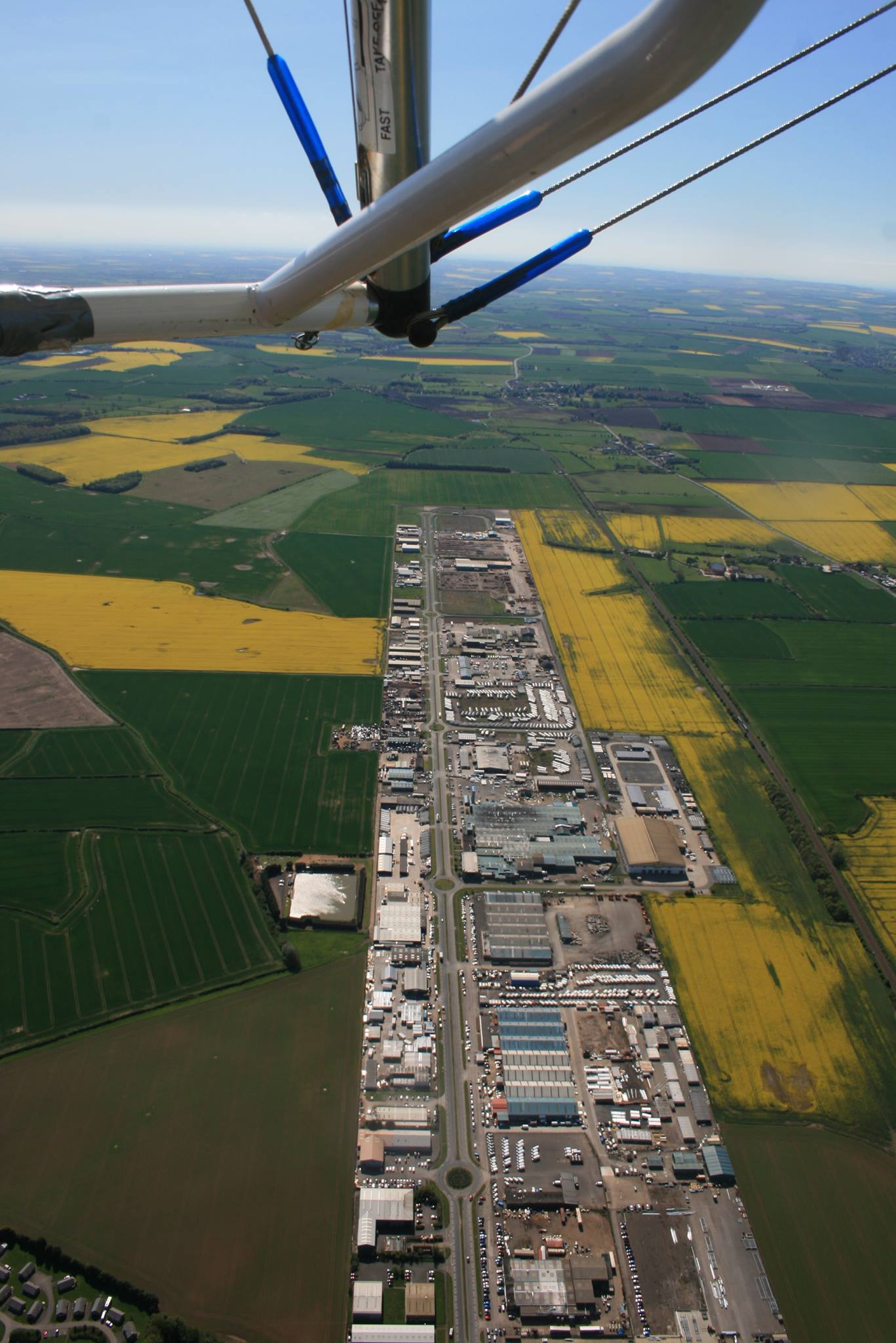
The runway at the former RAF Carnaby, south of Bridlington in the East Riding of Yorkshire, England. Formerly an emergency landing base for RAF Bomber Command, with an unusually long and wide runway for damaged bombers returning from Europe in the Second World War.

RAF Carnaby was for many years used for the storage of new Lada cars and a parts distribution centre. The runway and other paved areas were also used to hold motorcycle racing events throughout the 1970s and 1980s, some of which were televised. Today it has been developed into Carnaby Industrial Estate.
