= Toads on Roads =

Toads on Roads is a project run by UK registered charity Froglife with the aims of recording locations where toads and other amphibians have to cross roads to reach breeding sites, and are thus at risk of being killed by traffic, and helping to coordinate local community "Toad Patrols" to help amphibians safely cross roads.

== Background ==
Toads on Roads is a conservationist project aiming to protect the population of toads and amphibians in the UK, between 1985 and 2021 the population of the common toad in the UK fell by as much as 41%. A major reason for this decline seems to be the expansion of roads into historical breeding areas as toads often migrate to their ancestral ponds. Froglife estimates roughly 20 tonnes of toads are killed annually on roads in the UK. Climate change has also been raised as a concern for populations as milder winters and dryer weather has effected hibernation and prey populations. Declines in toad populations are considered ecologically worrying to due their use as pest control (by eating insects and slugs) as well them acting as a major food source for snakes and many birds. Toads and frogs are also often used as indicator species for measuring the health of an ecosystem and levels of pollution.

== Toad Patrols ==
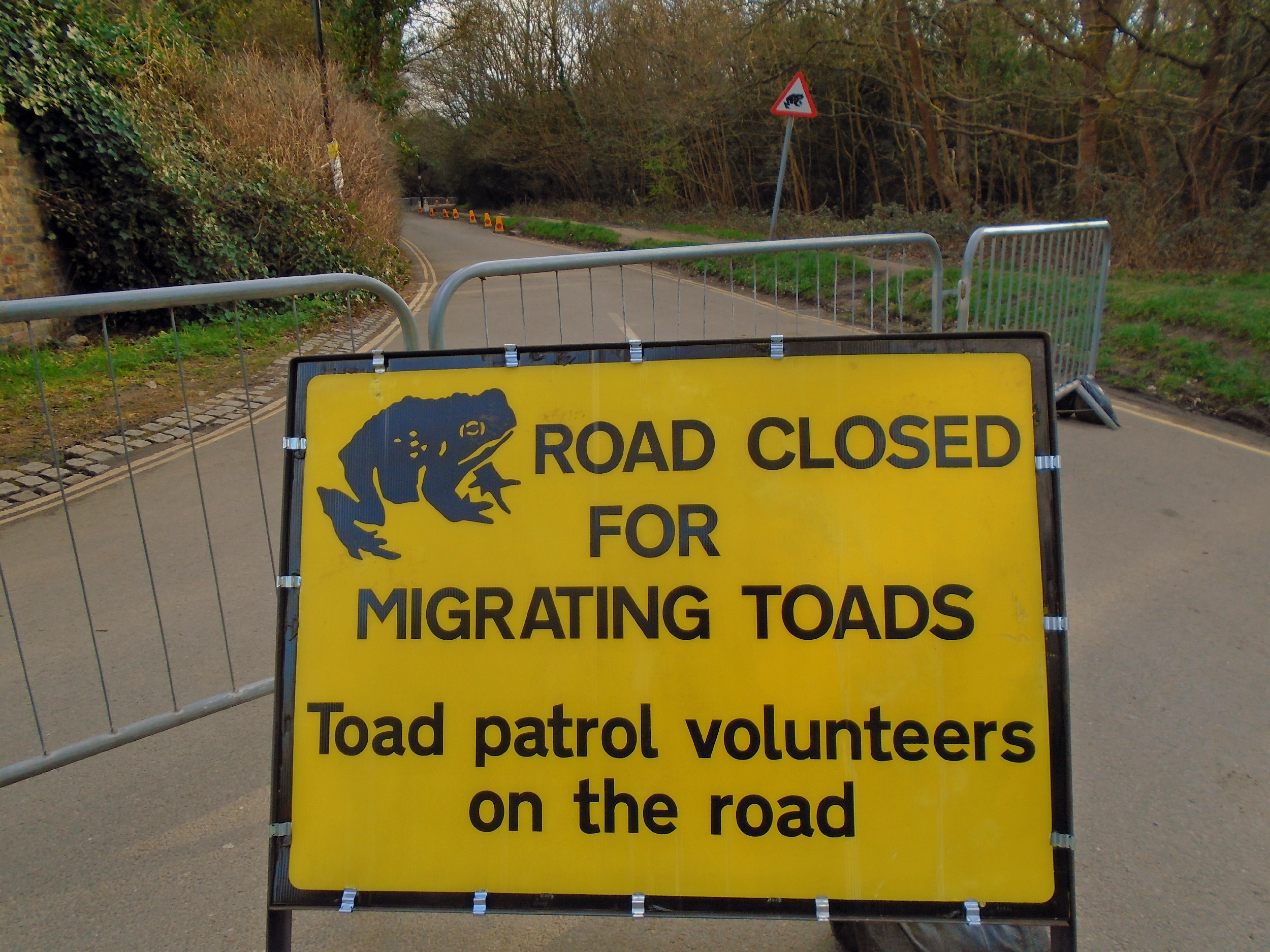
An example of a sign showing a road closed for toads

Toad Patrolling has existed in Hampshire since 1973, and started to grow as a movement in the early 1980s. With Froglife starting to collect data on toad patrols in 1974. As of 2025 Froglife records data from 284 active patrols. Toad Patrols are usually active only during the spring as toads require wet weather and temperatures of greater than 5 °C to migrate to breeding sites. Toad Patrols usually go out during the evening when toads are most active and use buckets to help safely move toads across roads, as the use of tunnels in other countries has had mixed results. Due to risks associated with being out on roads in dark conditions joining patrols is sometimes restricted to over 18s and requires high visibility clothing. A number of roads in the UK have also been closed off during the breeding season of toads because of activism from toad patrols such as in Bath, Warminster and Ludlow.

In 2025, toad patrols monitored by Froglife recorded moving 156,227 toads, with a total of 2 million toads moved since 1974. However Froglife has stated that there are a lot of registered crossings without any active toad patrols to protect them, especially in Scotland, The Midlands and north east England.

Froglife has also reported well-being benefits in volunteers, coming from the sense of community and psychical activity.
