= Tobacco Merchant's House =

Building in Glasgow, Scotland

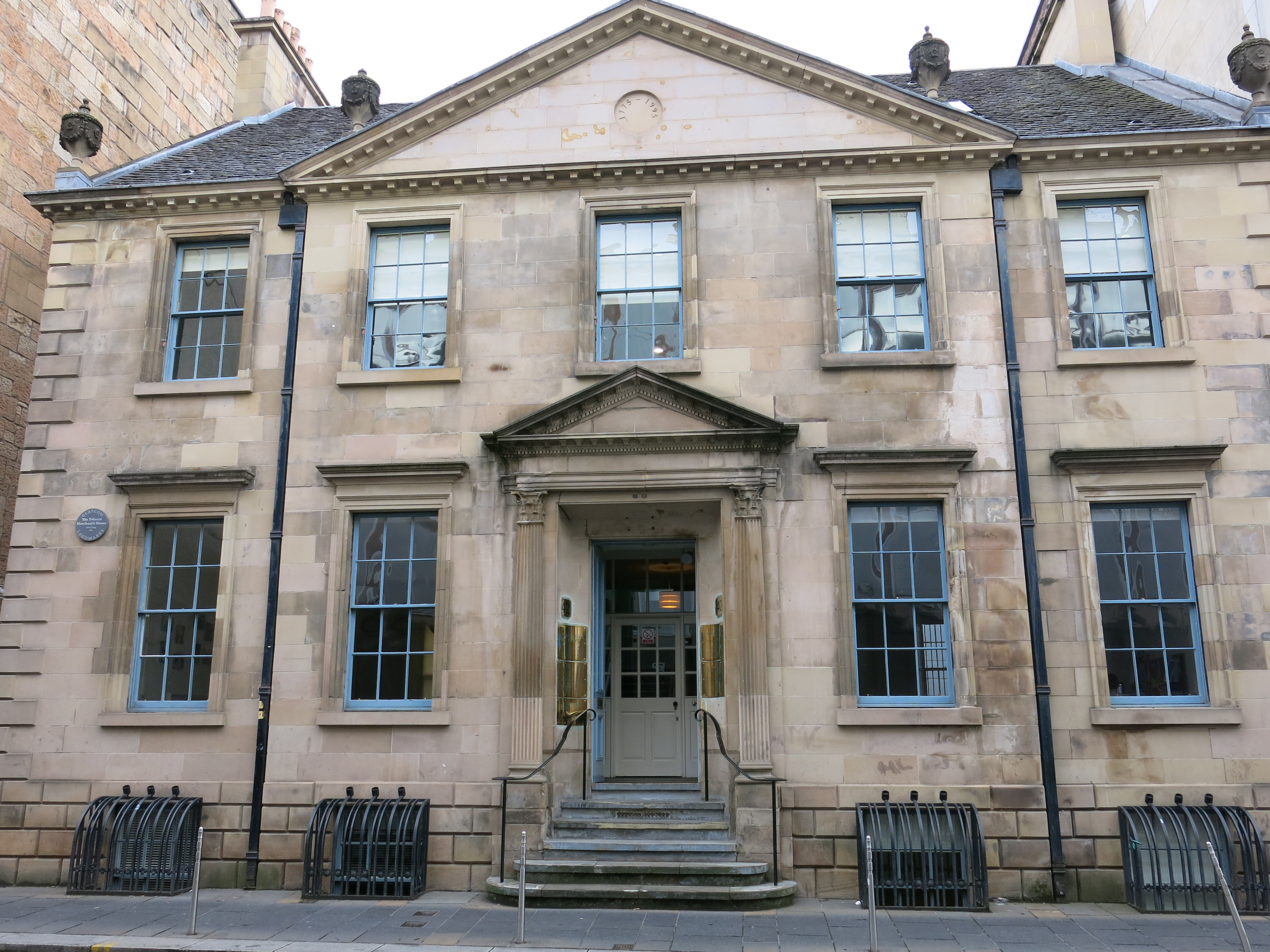
- Tobacco Merchant's House
- Interactive map of Tobacco Merchant's House
- Former names: Baillie Craig's House

General information
- Architectural style: Simplified Palladian
- Location: NGR: NS 59212 65125, 42 Miller Street, Glasgow, Scotland, UK, Glasgow, Scotland, UK
- Coordinates: 55°51′31″N 4°15′03″W
- Completed: 1775

Design and construction
- Architect: John Craig

Renovating team
- Renovating firm: McGurn, Logan, Duncan and Opfer

References
- http://portal.historicenvironment.scot/designation/LB32760; http://www.scottisharchitects.org.uk/building_full.php?id=421530; https://canmore.org.uk/site/140740/glasgow-42-miller-street-baillie-craigs-house

The Tobacco Merchant's House (also Baillie Craig's House) is an 18th-century villa at 42 Miller Street in Glasgow's Merchant City and the last surviving Virginia tobacco merchant's house in Glasgow. It was built by John Craig in 1775. The building was extensively renovated in 1994-5 and now serves as the offices of the Scottish Civic Trust.

== History ==
=== 18th Century ===
The two-storey-and-attic, five-bay simplified Palladian town house was originally built by the Glasgow architect John Craig for himself. He purchased the land from Robert Hastie, an American merchant. Craig was the son of a timber merchant and listed himself as ' 'architect to His Royal Highness the Prince of Wales'. Craig sold the house to the tobacco importer Robert Findlay of Easterhill in 1782. At that time Miller Street was the location of the private homes of a number of prosperous Glasgow merchants.

=== 19th Century ===
Findlay's son, Robert Findlay Jr., developed the nearby Virginia Buildings used by early-19th-century tobacco traders in Glasgow. Findlay Jr. sold 42 Miller Street to the family firm of Findlay, Hopkirk and Co. during this development. The house was later occupied by William Connel, who joined the business then trading as Findlay, Duff and Co. The firm went bankrupt sometime in the 1820s and the property at 42 Miller Street was taken over by the Thistle Bank (later Hunters and Co., and then the Union Bank of Scotland).

Throughout the 1820s the building was used by a number of tenants. It was the premises of the merchant John Fyfe (1828–30), the writer (lawyer) W.C. Gordon (1828-9), Alliance Fire and Life Assurance (1829–31), the counting house of John Bryce (1829–31), who also had wine cellars and a tea warehouse nearby, accountant Alexander Mein (1829–30), junior merchant John Morrison (1829–30), merchants Pearson, Walker, & Co., and Thomas Bryce Buchanan of Boquhan (1830-1).

In 1843–4, 42 Miller Street was the premises for the office of the Bankhead Colliery, Mr. R.H. Simpson, Coalmaster; the writer (lawyer) James Simpson; and Ebenezer Steven & Co., cotton spinners and power-loom cloth manufacturers. In 1856-7 the building was the office of the City & Suburban Gas Company.

==== Alterations ====
A number of changes were made to the structure at the end of the 19th century by the noted Glasgow architectural firm of Honeyman and Keppie at the time Charles Rennie Mackintosh was an employee. The building was then home to Gordon & Arnott, mantle manufacturers. Changes at this time included the addition of a mansard roof, which was removed during later renovations.

=== 20th Century ===
The building served a variety of purposes throughout the 20th century. By mid century it was a dress shop. The building's historical significance was recognised when it was Category B-listed in 1970 and upgraded to an A listing in 1992.

== Renovation ==
By the 1990s, the building was derelict and faced an uncertain future. Credential Holdings Ltd., a property and development company, approached the Glasgow Building Preservation Trust with the offer of donating the property if the trust undertook its repair and restoration, which it did beginning in 1994. This work was undertaken by the firm McGurn, Logan, Duncan & Opfer, with works completed in 1995 for a total of £500,000. The building was then purchased by the Scottish Civic Trust with support from the Heritage Lottery Fund and the building remains the organisation's headquarters, as well as providing office space for a number of tenants.
