= The Grasslands Trust =

Conservation charity

The Grasslands Trust (registered charity #1097893) was established in 2002, and was the only organisation in the UK which focused solely on one of the most threatened native habitats; wildlife rich grasslands. Its aim was to protect and restore grassland habitats for the benefit of wildlife and people.

The Grasslands Trust raised over £1.4 million for the cause, which enabled them to save five sites of national importance, provide free advice to over 700 landowners, statutory bodies and partner organisations on grassland management, and lobby for better legal protection. They worked to get local communities more involved with their local grasslands.

The charity closed in 2012 due to cash problems.
