= Nottingham Civic Society =

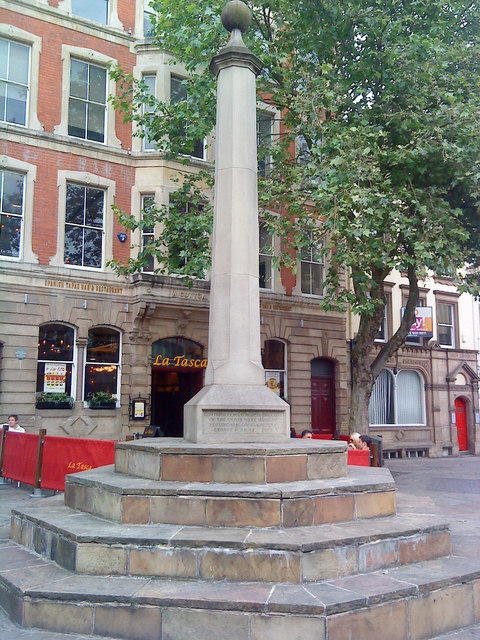
- The modern Weekday Cross reinstated by Nottingham Civic Society in 1993
- Established: (64 years ago)
- Legal status: Charity
- Purpose: Civic Heritage
- Location: Nottingham
- Region served: Nottingham

The Nottingham Civic Society is a civic society based in the city of Nottingham, England.

The society was founded in 1962 and aims to care for the city of Nottingham, especially with respect to its historic buildings and heritage. Meetings are held at Nottingham Mechanics, North Sherwood Street, previously at St Barnabas Cathedral Hall.

== See also ==
- Civic Trust
- Beeston Civic Society
