= Swindon Civic Trust =

Voluntary organisation in Swindon, England

The Swindon Civic Trust is a voluntary organisation and registered charity established in Swindon, England in 2001. Affiliated to the Civic Trust of England and Wales, the organisation's stated aims are to improve the quality of new and historic buildings and public spaces, and to help improve the general quality of urban life.

== History ==
The Trust was formed in 2001 at the AGM of the New Mechanics' Institution Preservation Trust, a group with the primary aim of preventing the destruction and disuse of Swindon Mechanics' Institute, and since then it has become a vocal campaigner in the town for a variety of topics. The Civic Trust applied for registered charity status in 2002.

Operating under the motto "Working together to create a better Swindon", the trust issued questionnaires to all candidates for the 2006 local elections to be held in May, canvassing them on their views of how to improve, develop and promote Swindon and published the answers on their website.

== Campaigns ==
=== Swindon Town Centre Regeneration ===
The trust put forwards its own proposals for the regeneration of Swindon Town Centre in 2004, as it felt the omission of Further Education or University campus' by Swindon Borough Council and the New Swindon Company was flawed.

"The trust strongly believed that a town centre university was vital for the successful economic and social regeneration of the central area."

The New Swindon Company originally rejected the idea of a campus in its scheme, claiming there was no room in the centre for such a development. Swindon Civic Trust canvassed the local population and identified various sites in the Town Centre where such a complex could be constructed.

=== Blue Plaques ===
The trust campaigned for recognition of Swindon's landmarks and notable residences, these are commemorated elsewhere in the United Kingdom through English Heritage's Blue plaque scheme.

Following acceptance, Swindon Civic Trust are now the body that issues and erects these plaques in the Swindon area. The initial plaque was erected on the former residence of the de Villet family who were (with the Goddard family) one of the most influential families in Swindon from the period 1600-1900. The Civic Trust has invited local residents to nominate further sitings of Blue Plaques in the town.

=== Coate Water ===
Coate Water Country Park lies on the eastern outskirts of Swindon, it is a large nature reserve that also contains a pre-historic Stone Circle. Following Swindon Borough Council's decision not to site a University Campus in the Town Centre, they earmarked land adjacent to Coate Water and the Great Western Hospital as a potential site for a satellite campus for the University of Bath.

The Civic Trust opposed this move, stating that any development in this area would in all likelihood impact on the local ecosystem. The Trust once again pointed out the potential for a Campus location in the Town Centre, stating that -

"The town centre desperately needs the stimulus that a central campus would bring if it is to attract developers for its long overdue redevelopment"

The issue was further compounded when Coate Water was voted "Swindon's Favourite Place" by the local population, in a competition organised by the trust.

Protests, including the 2004 "Hands around Coate Water" event, have heightened awareness of the Trust's campaign. Revised plans for the development are to be submitted.

=== Promotion of Swindon's heritage ===
Swindon Civic Trust assisted English Heritage and the Steam Museum in the organisation of Brunel 200, the local and national celebration of Isambard Kingdom Brunel's 200th birthday. The trust arranged exhibitions in the town displaying historic images and records celebrating amongst others, the impact of the Great Western Railway and also the siting of the GWR Works in the town.
