= Cockburn Association =

Architectural conservation organisation

The Cockburn Association, often subtitled Edinburgh Civic Trust, is an architectural conservation, and urban planning monitoring organisation in the city of Edinburgh, Scotland, United Kingdom.

The Cockburn Association, founded in 1875, is one of the world's oldest architectural conservation and urban planning monitoring organisations.

The association successfully resisted plans to build an inner-city motorway system in Edinburgh in 1965. In 2004 it mounted a major campaign to resist the removal of trees at Bruntsfield Links. The association has campaigned for the retention and improvement of Edinburgh's open and green spaces ever since.

== See also ==
- Architectural Heritage Society of Scotland
- Civic Trust (England and Wales)
- National Trust for Scotland
- Scottish Civic Trust
