= Basil Robinson (RAF officer) =

Royal Air Force officer

Basil Vernon Robinson
- Born: 1912; Gateshead, County Durham, England
- Died: 23 August 1943 (aged 31); Berlin, Germany
- Military career
- Allegiance: United Kingdom
- Branch: Royal Air Force
- Rank: Group captain
- Conflicts: Second World War: European theatre
- Awards: Distinguished Service Order; Distinguished Flying Cross & Bar; Air Force Cross

Group Captain Basil Vernon Robinson DSO DFC & bar AFC (1912–1943) was a pilot with RAF Bomber Command during World War II. He is most notable for flying a Handley Page Halifax bomber over 500 miles back to England and safely landing it after the other six crew members had bailed out.

Robinson was born in Gateshead, County Durham and was a keen rugby player. He was commissioned into the RAF in 1933 and joined No. 35 Squadron RAF in 1941 after completing a tour of duty as a pilot on Whitley bombers. On 18 December 1941 he was involved in an air raid on German battleships Scharnhorst and Gneisenau and was awarded the DFC for his actions. In March 1942 he was appointed commander of 35 Squadron which became a pathfinder unit.

On the night of 18/19 November 1942 after a raid on Turin, Italy a target indicator flare left hanging in the 22 ft long bomb bay of Robinson's aircraft burst into flames whilst he was flying over the Alps. He ordered the crew to bail out and stayed at the controls whilst they did so to maintain level flight. However, by the time they had all jumped he realised that the flames had died down. He therefore decided to attempt to fly the large aircraft back to England over hostile territory without a navigator, flight engineer, wireless operator or air gunners.

He was subsequently promoted to group captain and appointed the station commander at RAF Graveley. He died on the night of 23/24 August 1943 near Wensickendorf, Germany when his Halifax HR928 was shot down by a nightfighter during a raid on Berlin. He is buried in the Berlin 1939-45 war cemetery.
