= Scottish Civic Trust =

British charitable organization

The Scottish Civic Trust is a registered charity. Founded in 1967, and based in the Category A-listed Tobacco Merchant's House in Glasgow, the Trust aims to provide "leadership and focus in the protection, enhancement and development of Scotland's built environment". It often comments on planning applications. From 1990 to 2011 the Trust maintained the Buildings at Risk Register for Scotland on behalf of Historic Environment Scotland and delivers the popular Doors Open Days programme in Scotland. The current director of the Trust is Joe Traynor.

== See also ==
- Cockburn Association (Edinburgh Civic Trust)
- Doors Open Days Scotland
- Architectural Heritage Society of Scotland
- Cambusnethan House
