= Architectural Heritage Society of Scotland =

The Architectural Heritage Society of Scotland (AHSS) is a society dedicated to the protection and study of the built heritage of Scotland. It has around 1000 members and five regional groups responsible for commenting on planning applications in their area together with educational activities. The Society publishes periodically the academic journal, Architectural Heritage, together with a twice-yearly magazine addressing a wider range of built heritage-related matters.

== History ==
In 1956, a campaign group, the Georgian Group of Edinburgh, was established to oppose the demolition of 18th-century houses around George Square in Edinburgh. Eleanor Robertson and the architectural historian Colin McWilliam were instrumental in its founding.

In 1957, George Baillie-Hamilton, 12th Earl of Haddington, became the first president of the group, which was renamed as the Scottish Georgian Society in 1959. From the 1960s the society began to broaden its interest beyond the Georgian period and its geographical locus. In the 1960s, the Scottish Georgian Society formed a West of Scotland Group based in Glasgow under the chairmanship of bookseller Robert Clow, who had earlier formed the influential New Glasgow Society with architect Geoffrey Jarvis and others. In 1984, the present AHSS name was adopted to suit. The Society's logo, a drawing of the Old Town House in Aberdeen, was adopted in the 1960s. In 2009, the society was reconstituted as a company with the status of a registered charity.

== Activities ==
Since its establishment, the Society has been involved in commenting and advising on development proposals which affect the historic buildings and townscapes of Scotland. The Society also runs regular lecture series on Scottish architecture, architects, and buildings.

== Structure ==
The Society is organized into five regional groups, each of whom undertake casework and organize educational activities. Management is by a national council comprising representatives of the five regional groups and elected members. As of October 2019 the office bearers were:

- President: Simon Green MA FSA FSA Scot
- National Chairman: Martin Robertson
- Vice-Chairman: Jocelyn Cunliffe
- Honorary Treasurer: Caroline Roussot

The Society's national office was based at the Glasite Meeting House in Barony Street, Edinburgh, built in 1836 as a chapel for the Glasite Christian sect. In October 2012 it was given, with an endowment, to the Scottish Historic Buildings Trust (SHBT) and the Society is now based at 15 Rutland Square, Edinburgh, EH1 2BB.

== Publications ==
Since 1990, the Society has published Architectural Heritage, an annual academic journal dedicated to the study of Scotland's buildings. These comprehensive studies of many of Scotland's most renowned architects – including thematic studies on William Adam, Robert Adam, the contemporaries of Charles Rennie Mackintosh, the Gothic Revival in Scotland, and essays on Scottish Architects' Papers – are published alongside a wide range of other architectural topics, creating a comprehensive and essential source for Scotland's architecture.

The twice-yearly magazine contains reports on built heritage issues, casework, and group events.
