= Civic Trust for Wales =

UK charity

The Civic Trust for Wales (Welsh: Ymddiriedolaeth Ddinesig Cymru) was founded in 1964. It is a registered charity.

The organisation promotes civic pride as a means to improve the quality of life for all in the places where the Welsh live and work. It encourages community action, good design, sustainable development and respect for the built environment amongst people of all ages.

The Trust is the umbrella body for 56 Civic Societies around Wales. Civic Societies are open to anyone who shares a concern for quality in the built environment, good design and care for the heritage.

The Civic Trust for Wales organises "Open Doors" events on behalf of Cadw, the historic environment service of the Welsh Government. Open Doors is part of European Heritage Days and is held in the month of September.

In 2015 it was renamed Civic Trust Cymru.

Since 2016 it has been dormant.
