= Civic Voice =

UK charity

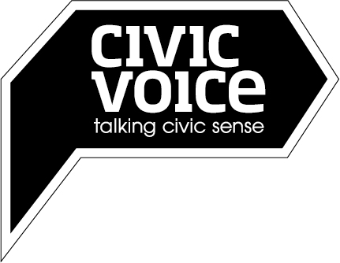
- Civic Voice logo
- Predecessor: Civic Trust
- Formation: 2010
- Type: Nonprofit
- Legal status: Registered charity
- Headquarters: Weymouth
- Region served: England
- Website: www.civicvoice.org.uk

Civic Voice is the national charity for the civic movement in England. It provides support and advice to its members, which largely consists of locally based civic societies, most of them charities.

== History and organisation ==
Civic Voice was set up in 2010 following the demise of the Civic Trust. It is now a fully remote organisation and registered at 70 Cowcross Street in London.

The president of Civic Voice is Griff Rhys Jones. Its vice-presidents are Laura Sandys, Baroness Andrews, Sir Terry Farrell and Freddie Gick. Civic Voice has had two co-chairs since November 2024: Robert Osborne from St Albans Civic Society, and Andrew Jackson from Manchester Civic Society, supported by a further three trustees.

Until 2023, it was the public entry point and provided the secretariat for the All Party Parliamentary Group for Civic Societies.

== Programmes and projects ==
Initiatives led by Civic Voice have included:

- Putting community led design at the heart of placemaking
- Big Conservation Conversation
- England's favourite Conservation Area
- Civic Day
- High Streets
- Local heritage lists
- Rebalancing the planning system: Giving communities a meaningful voice
- Street clutter campaign

Civic Voice has worked with the War Memorials Trust to promote understanding and historical recollection in relation to war memorials.

== See also ==
- Civic Trust
- Civic Trust for Wales
- The Scottish Civic Trust
