= List of Special Areas of Conservation in England =

The following is a list of Special Areas of Conservation in England.

- Alde, Ore and Butley Estuaries
- Arnecliff and Park Hole Woods
- Arun Valley
- Asby Complex
- Ashdown Forest
- Aston Rowant
- Avon Gorge Woodlands
- Barnack Hills and Holes
- Baston Fen
- Bath and Bradford-on-Avon Bats
- Beast Cliff – Whitby (Robin Hood's Bay)
- Bee's Nest and Green Clay Pits
- Beer Quarry and Caves
- Benacre to Easton Bavents Lagoons
- Berwickshire and North Northumberland Coast
- Birklands and Bilhaugh
- Blackstone Point
- Blean Complex
- Bolton Fell Moss
- Border Mires, Kielder – Butterburn
- Borrowdale Woodland Complex
- Bracket's Coppice
- Braunton Burrows
- Breckland
- Bredon Hill
- Breney Common and Goss and Tregoss Moors
- Briddlesford Copses
- Brown Moss
- Burnham Beeches
- Butser Hill
- Calf Hill and Cragg Woods
- Cannock Chase
- Cannock Extension Canal
- Carrine Common
- Castle Eden Dene
- Castle Hill
- Cerne and Sydling Downs
- Chesil and the Fleet
- Chilmark Quarries
- Chilterns Beechwoods
- Clints Quarry
- Cothill Fen
- Cotswold Beechwoods
- Craven Limestone Complex
- Crookhill Brick Pit
- Crowdy Marsh
- Culm Grasslands
- Cumbrian Marsh Fritillary Site
- Dartmoor
- Dawlish Warren
- Denby Grange Colliery Ponds
- Devil's Dyke, Cambridgeshire
- Dew's Ponds
- Dixton Wood
- Dorset Heaths (Purbeck and Wareham) and Studland Dunes
- Dorset Heaths
- Dover to Kingsdown Cliffs
- Downton Gorge
- Drigg Coast
- Duddon Mosses
- Duncton to Bignor Escarpment
- Dungeness
- Durham Coast
- East Devon Pebblebed Heaths
- East Hampshire Hangers
- Ebernoe Common
- Eller's Wood and Sand Dale
- Emer Bog
- Ensor's Pool
- Epping Forest
- Essex Estuaries
- Eversden and Wimpole Woods
- Exmoor and Quantock Oakwoods
- Exmoor Heaths
- Fal and Helford
- Fen Bog
- Fenland
- Fenn's, Whixall, Bettisfield, Wem and Cadney Mosses
- Fens Pools
- Flamborough Head
- Folkestone to Etchinghill escarpment
- Fontmell and Melbury Downs
- Ford Moss
- Gang Mine
- Gibraltar Point
- Godrevy Head to St Agnes
- Great Yews
- Grimsthorpe
- Hackpen Hill
- Haig Fras
- Harbottle Moors
- Hartslock Wood
- Hastings Cliffs
- Hatfield Moor
- Helbeck and Swindale Woods
- Hestercombe House
- Holme Moor and Clean Moor
- Ingleborough Complex
- Isle of Portland to Studland Cliffs
- Isle of Wight Downs
- Isles of Scilly Complex
- Kennet and Lambourn Floodplain
- Kennet Valley Alderwoods
- Kingley Vale
- Kirk Deighton
- Lake District High Fells
- Lewes Downs (Mount Caburn)
- Little Wittenham
- Lower Bostraze and Leswidden
- Lower Derwent Valley
- Lundy
- Lydden and Temple Ewell Downs
- Lyppard Grange Ponds
- Manchester Mosses
- Marsland Valley
- Mells Valley
- Mendip Limestone Grasslands
- Mendip Woodlands
- Minsmere to Walberswick Heaths and Marshes
- Mole Gap to Reigate Escarpment
- Moor House – Upper Teesdale
- Morecambe Bay Pavements
- Morecambe Bay
- Mottey Meadows
- Mottisfont Bats
- Naddle Forest
- Nene Washes
- Newham Fen
- Newlyn Downs
- Norfolk Valley Fens
- North Downs Woodlands
- North Meadow and Clattinger Farm
- North Norfolk Coast
- North Northumberland Dunes
- North Pennine Dales Meadows
- North Pennine Moors
- North Somerset and Mendip Bats
- North York Moors
- Oak Mere
- Orfordness – Shingle Street
- Orton Pit
- Ouse Washes
- Overstrand Cliffs
- Ox Close
- Oxford Meadows
- Parkgate Down
- Paston Great Barn
- Pasturefields Salt Marsh
- Peak District Dales
- Penhale Dunes
- Peter's Pit
- Pewsey Downs
- Phoenix United Mine and Crow's Nest
- Plymouth Sound and Estuaries
- Polruan to Polperro
- Portholme
- Prescombe Down
- Quants
- Queendown Warren
- Rex Graham Reserve
- Richmond Park
- River Avon
- River Axe
- River Camel
- River Clun
- River Dee and Bala Lake
- River Derwent and Bassenthwaite Lake
- River Derwent
- River Eden
- River Ehen
- River Itchen
- River Kent
- River Lambourn
- River Mease
- River Tweed
- River Wensum
- River Wye
- Rixton Clay Pits
- Rochdale Canal
- Rodborough Common
- Roman Wall Loughs
- Rook Clift
- Rooksmoor
- Roudsea Wood and Mosses
- Roydon Common and Dersingham Bog
- Salisbury Plain
- Saltfleetby-Theddlethorpe Dunes National Nature Reserve
- Sandwich Bay
- Sefton Coast
- Shortheath Common
- Sidmouth to West Bay
- Simonside Hills
- Singleton and Cocking Tunnels
- Skipwith Common
- Solent and Isle of Wight Lagoons
- Solent Maritime
- Solway Firth
- South Dartmoor Woods
- South Devon Shore Dock
- South Hams
- South Pennine Moors
- South Solway Mosses
- South Wight Maritime
- St Albans Head to Durlston Head
- St Austell Clay Pits
- Staverton Park and The Thicks, Wantisden
- Stodmarsh
- Strensall Common
- Subberthwaite, Blawith and Torver Low Commons
- Tarn Moss
- Thanet Coast
- The Broads
- The Lizard
- The Mens
- The New Forest
- The Stiperstones and The Hollies
- The Wash and North Norfolk Coast
- Thorne Moors
- Thrislington
- Thursley, Ash, Pirbright and Chobham
- Tintagel–Marsland–Clovelly Coast
- Tregonning Hill
- Tweed Estuary
- Tyne and Allen River Gravels
- Tyne and Nent
- Ullswater Oakwoods
- Walton Moss
- Wast Water
- Waveney and Little Ouse Valley Fens
- West Dorset Alder Woods
- West Midlands Mosses
- Wimbledon Common
- Windsor Forest and Great Park
- Winterton – Horsey Dunes
- Witherslack Mosses
- Woolmer Forest
- Wormley Hoddesdonpark Woods
- Wye and Crundale Downs
- Wye Valley and Forest of Dean Bat Sites
- Wye Valley Woodlands
- Yewbarrow Woods

== See also ==
- List of Special Areas of Conservation in Scotland
- List of Special Areas of Conservation in Wales
- List of Special Areas of Conservation in Northern Ireland

== Sources ==
- SACs in the United Kingdom – Joint Nature Conservation Committee
