= List of Special Areas of Conservation in Scotland =

The following is a list of Special Areas of Conservation in Scotland.

- Abhainn Clais An Eas and Allt a`Mhuilinn
- Achnahaird
- Airds Moss
- Altnaharra
- Amat Woods
- Ardgour Pinewoods
- Ardmeanach
- Ardnamurchan Burns
- Ardvar and Loch a`Mhuilinn Woodlands
- Ascrib, Isay and Dunvegan
- Ballochbuie
- Bankhead Moss, Beith
- Barry Links
- Beinn a' Ghlò
- Beinn Bhàn
- Beinn Dearg
- Beinn Iadain and Beinn na h`Uamha
- Ben Alder and Aonach Beag
- Beinn Heasgarnich
- Ben Lawers
- Ben Lui
- Ben Nevis
- Ben Wyvis
- Berriedale and Langwell Waters
- Berwickshire (and North Northumberland Coast in England)
- Black Loch Moss
- Black Wood of Rannoch
- Blawhorn Moss
- Borders Woods
- Braehead Moss
- Broubster Leans
- Buchan Ness to Collieston
- Burrow Head
- Caenlochan
- Cairngorms
- Caithness and Sutherland Peatlands
- Cape Wrath
- Carn nan Tri-Tighearnan
- Carsegowan Moss
- Cawdor Wood
- Claish Moss and Kentra Moss
- Clyde Valley Woods
- Coalburn Moss
- Cockinhead Moss
- Coille Mhór
- Coladoir Bog
- Coll Machair
- Conon Islands
- Coyles of Muick
- Craigengar
- Craighall Gorge
- Cranley Moss
- Creag Meagaidh
- Creag nan Gamhainn
- Crieff Woods
- Culbin Bar
- Dam Wood
- Dinnet Oakwood
- Dogden Moss
- Dornoch Firth and Morrich More
- Drumochter Hills
- Dun Moss and Forest of Alyth Mires
- Dunkeld – Blairgowrie Lochs
- Durness
- Dykeneuk Moss
- East Caithness Cliffs
- East Mires and Lumbister
- Eilean na Muice Duibhe
- Eileanan agus Sgeiran Lios mór
- Endrick Water
- Fair Isle
- Fannich Hills
- Faray and Holm of Faray
- Feur Lochain
- Firth of Lorn
- Firth of Tay & Eden Estuary
- Flanders Moss
- Flow of Dergoals
- Foinaven
- Galloway Oakwoods
- Glac na Criche
- Glen Beasdale
- Glen Coe
- Glen Creran Woods
- Glen Shira
- Glen Tanar
- Glenartney Juniper Wood
- Green Hill of Strathdon
- Hascosay
- Hill of Towanreef
- Hoy
- Inchnadamph
- Insh Marshes
- Inverasdale Peatlands
- Invernaver
- Inverpolly
- Isle of May
- Keen of Hamar
- Keltneyburn
- Kilhern Moss
- Kinloch and Kyleakin Hills
- Kinveachy Forest
- Kippenrait Glen
- Kirkcowan Flow
- Ladder Hills
- Langavat
- Ledmore Wood
- Lendalfoot Hills Complex
- Lewis Peatlands
- Lismore Lochs
- Little Gruinard River
- Loch a`Phuill
- Loch Achnacloich
- Loch Creran
- Loch Etive Woods
- Loch Fada
- Loch Laxford
- Loch Lomond Woods
- Loch Maree Complex
- Loch Moidart and Loch Shiel Woods
- Loch nam Madadh
- Loch of Isbister
- Loch of Stenness
- Loch of Wester
- Loch Roag Lagoons
- Loch Ruthven
- Loch Ussie
- Loch Watten
- Lochs Duich, Long and Alsh Reefs
- Lower Findhorn Woods
- Lower River Spey – Spey Bay
- Luce Bay and Sands
- Meall na Samhna
- Merrick Kells
- Methven Moss
- Mingarry Burn
- Mochrum Lochs
- Moffat Hills
- Moidach More
- Mòine Mhór
- Mointeach nan Lochain Dubha
- Mointeach Scadabhaigh
- Monach Islands
- Monadh Mor
- Monadhliath
- Moniack Gorge
- Moorfoot Hills
- Moray Firth
- Morrone Birkwood
- Mortlach Moss
- Morven and Mullachdubh
- Morvern Woods
- Mound Alderwoods
- Mousa
- Muir of Dinnet
- Mull Oakwoods
- Mull of Galloway
- Ness Woods
- North Fetlar
- North Harris
- North Rona
- North Shotts Moss
- North Uist Machair
- Obain Loch Euphoirt
- Oldshoremore and Sandwood
- Onich to North Ballachulish Woods
- Oronsay
- Papa Stour
- Peeswit Moss
- Pitkeathly Mires
- Pitmaduthy Moss
- Raeburn Flow
- Rannoch Moor
- Rassal
- Red Moss of Netherley
- Red Moss, Oldtown
- Reidside Moss
- Rhidorroch Woods
- Rigg – Bile
- Rinns of Islay
- River Bladnoch
- River Borgie
- River Dee
- River Evelix
- River Kerry
- River Moidart
- River Moriston
- River Naver
- River Oykel
- River South Esk
- River Spey
- River Tay
- River Teith
- River Thurso
- River Tweed
- Ronas Hill – North Roe
- Rùm
- Sanday, Orkney
- Sands of Forvie
- Shelforkie
- Shingle Islands
- Sligachan Peatlands
- Slochd
- Solway Firth
- Solway Mosses North
- Sound of Arisaig (Loch Ailort to Loch Ceann Traigh)
- South Uist Machair
- South-East Islay Skerries
- St Abb's Head to Fast Castle
- St Kilda
- Strath
- Strathglass Complex
- Strathy Point
- Stromness Heaths and Coast
- Sullom Voe
- Sunart
- Tarbert Woods
- Taynish and Knapdale Woods
- Tayvallich Juniper and Coast
- The Maim
- The Vadills
- Threepwood Moss
- Tingon
- Tiree Machair
- Tràigh na Berie
- Treshnish Isles
- Trossachs Woods
- Trotternish Ridge
- Tulach Hill and Glen Fender Meadows
- Turclossie Moss
- Turflundie Wood
- Tynron Juniper Wood
- Upper Nithsdale Woods
- Urquhart Bay Wood
- Waukenwae Moss
- West Fannyside Moss
- Whitlaw and Branxholme
- Yell Sound Coast

== See also ==
- List of Special Areas of Conservation in England
- List of Special Areas of Conservation in Wales
- List of Special Areas of Conservation in Northern Ireland

== Sources ==
- JNCC list of UK SACs (accessed 30 October 2006)
