= Overstrand Cliffs =

UK Site of Special Scientific Interest

Coordinates: 52.924°N 1.325°E

- Site of Special Scientific Interest
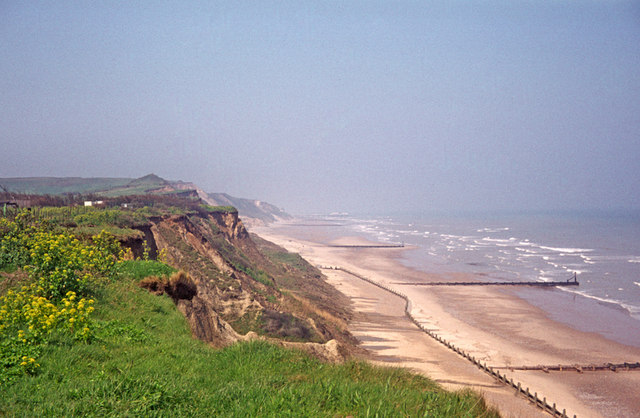
- Location of Overstrand Cliffs.
- Area of search: Norfolk, England
- Grid reference: TG 236 415
- Interest: Biological; Geological
- Area: 57.8 hectares (143 acres)
- Notification date: 1992
- Location map: Magic Map

Overstrand Cliffs is a 57.8-hectare (143-acre) biological and geological Site of Special Scientific Interest in Cromer in Norfolk, England. It is a Special Area of Conservation and part of it is a Geological Conservation Review site.

These soft cliffs are subject to falls and slumping, providing a habitat for species associated with disturbance such as the rare beetles Bledius filipes, Harpalus vernalis and Nebria livida. The cliff is geologically important for its succession of Pleistocene glacial exposures.

The beach is open to the public.
