= Parsonage Moor =

Nature reserve in Oxfordshire, England

Coordinates: 51.6956°N 1.3354°W

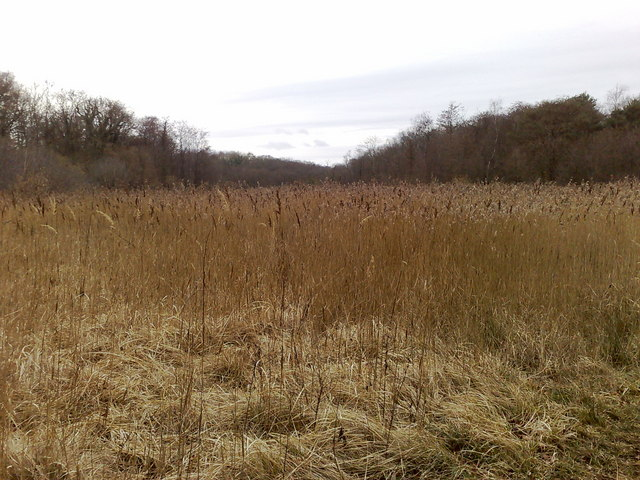
- Interactive map of Parsonage Moor
- Type: Nature reserve
- Location: Abingdon-on-Thames, Oxfordshire
- OS grid: SU459999
- Area: 6 hectares (15 acres)
- Manager: Berkshire, Buckinghamshire and Oxfordshire Wildlife Trust

Parsonage Moor is a 6-hectare (15-acre) nature reserve north-west of Abingdon-on-Thames in Oxfordshire, United Kingdom. It is managed by the Berkshire, Buckinghamshire and Oxfordshire Wildlife Trust. It is part of Cothill Fen, which is a Site of Special Scientific Interest and Special Area of Conservation. Part of it is in Cothill Fen and Parsonage Moor Nature Conservation Review site, Grade I.

This site has fen, which is a nationally rare habitat, wet woodland, ancient woodland, open water and reedbeds. There are carnivorous plants, such as butterwort, which traps insects on its sticky leaves, and bladderwort, which traps them underwater. Other flora include southern marsh-orchids and the nationally scarce narrow-leaved marsh orchid
