= Area of ecological interest =

Area of ecological interest may refer to:

- Area of relevant ecological interest (Brazil), a type of conservation unit in Brazil
- Area of Special Conservation Interest, part of the Emerald network of conservation units in Europe and North Africa
- Site of Special Scientific Interest, a type of conservation unit in the United Kingdom
- Site of Special Scientific Interest (Hong Kong), a type of conservation unit in Hong Kong
- Zone naturelle d'intérêt écologique, faunistique et floristique, a type of conservation unit in France
