= Sallachy =

Coordinates: 57.31813°N 5.47063°W

Sallachy: Scottish Gaelic: Salachaidh
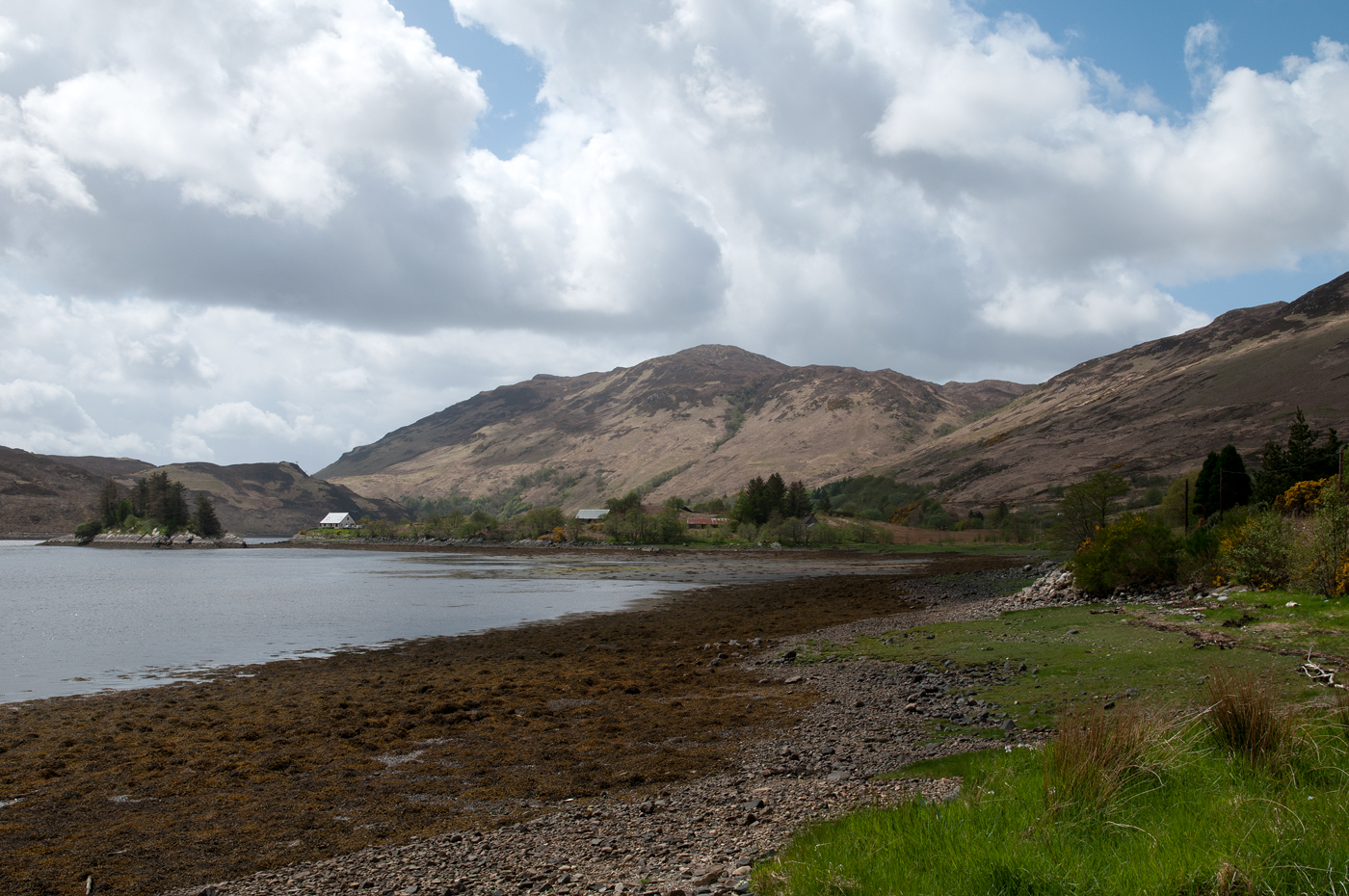
- Loch Long at Sallachy

- Location within the Ross and Cromarty area
- OS grid reference: NG911306
- Council area: Highland
- Country: Scotland
- Sovereign state: United Kingdom
- Post town: Dornie
- Postcode district: IV40 8
- Police: Scotland
- Fire: Scottish
- Ambulance: Scottish

Sallachy (Scottish Gaelic: Salachaidh) is a hamlet on the north shore of Loch Long in the district of Skye and Lochalsh in the Scottish Highlands and is in the council area of Highland.
