= List of Special Areas of Conservation in Wales =

The following is a list of Special Areas of Conservation in Wales.

Name	Location
Aberbargoed Grasslands	Caerphilly
Afon Eden – Cors Goch Trawsfynydd	Gwynedd
Afon Gwyrfai a Llyn Cwellyn	Gwynedd
Afon Teifi / River Teifi	Carmarthenshire, Ceredigion, Pembrokeshire
Afon Tywi / River Tywi	Carmarthenshire
Afonydd Cleddau / Cleddau Rivers	Carmarthenshire, Pembrokeshire
Alyn Valley Woods / Coedwigoedd Dyffryn Alun	
Bae Cemlyn / Cemlyn Bay	
Berwyn a Mynyddoedd De Clwyd / Berwyn and South Clwyd Mountains	Denbighshire, Flintshire, Gwynedd, Powys, Wrexham
Blackmill Woodlands	
Blaen Cynon	Rhondda Cynon Taf
Brecon Beacons / Bannau Brycheiniog	Powys
Cadair Idris	Gwynedd
Caeau Mynydd Mawr	
Cardiff Beech Woods	Cardiff, Rhondda Cynon Taf
Cardigan Bay / Bae Ceredigion	Ceredigion, Pembrokeshire
Carmarthen Bay and Estuaries / Bae Caerfyrddin ac Aberoedd	Carmarthenshire, Pembrokeshire, Swansea
Carmarthen Bay Dunes / Twyni Bae Caerfyrddin	Carmarthenshire, Swansea
Cernydd Carmel	
Clogwyni Pen Llyn / Seacliffs of Lleyn	Gwynedd
Coed Cwm Einion	
Coed y Cerrig	
Coedwigoedd Dyffryn Elwy / Elwy Valley Woods	
Coedwigoedd Penrhyn Creuddyn / Creuddyn Peninsula Woods	
Coedydd a Cheunant Rheidol / Rheidol Woods and Gorge	
Coedydd Aber	Conwy, Gwynedd
Coedydd Derw a Safleoedd Ystlumod Meirion / Meirionnydd Oakwoods and Bat Sites	Gwynedd
Coedydd Llawr-y-glyn	Powys
Coedydd Nedd a Mellte	Neath Port Talbot, Powys, Rhondda Cynon Taf
Coetiroedd Cwm Elan / Elan Valley Woodlands	Powys
Cors Caron	
Cors Fochno	
Corsydd Eifionydd	Gwynedd
Corsydd Llyn / Lleyn Fens	Gwynedd
Corsydd Môn / Anglesey Fens	
Crymlyn Bog / Cors Crymlyn	Neath Port Talbot, Swansea
Cwm Cadlan	Rhondda Cynon Taf
Cwm Clydach Woodlands / Coedydd Cwm Clydach	Blaenau Gwent, Monmouthshire
Cwm Doethie – Mynydd Mallaen	
Dee Estuary / Aber Dyfrdwy (part in England)	
Deeside and Buckley Newt Sites	
Drostre Bank	Powys
Dunraven Bay	Vale of Glamorgan
Elenydd	Ceredigion, Powys
Eryri / Snowdonia	Conwy, Gwynedd
Fenn's, Whixall, Bettisfield, Wem and Cadney Mosses (part in England)	
Glannau Môn: Cors Heli / Anglesey Coast: Saltmarsh	
Glannau Ynys Gybi / Holy Island Coast	
Glan-traeth	
Glaswelltiroedd Cefn Cribwr / Cefn Cribwr Grasslands	
Glynllifon	Gwynedd
Gower Ash Woods / Coedydd Ynn Gwyr	Swansea
Gower Commons / Tiroedd Comin Gwyr	Swansea
Granllyn	Powys
Great Orme's Head / Pen y Gogarth	Conwy
Grogwynion	
Gweunydd Blaencleddau	Pembrokeshire
Halkyn Mountain / Mynydd Helygain	
Johnstown Newt Sites	Wrexham
Kenfig / Cynffig	Bridgend, Neath Port Talbot, Vale of Glamorgan
Limestone Coast of South West Wales / Arfordir Calchfaen De Orllewin Cymru	Pembrokeshire, Swansea
Llangorse Lake / Llyn Syfaddan	Powys
Llwyn	
Llyn Dinam	
Migneint–Arenig–Dduallt	Conwy, Gwynedd
Montgomery Canal	Powys
Morfa Harlech a Morfa Dyffryn	Gwynedd
Mwyngloddiau Fforest Gwydir / Gwydyr Forest Mines	Conwy
Mynydd Epynt	Powys
North Pembrokeshire Woodlands / Coedydd Gogledd Sir Benfro	Pembrokeshire
North West Pembrokeshire Commons / Comins Gogledd Orllewin Sir Benfro	Pembrokeshire
Pembrokeshire Bat Sites and Bosherston Lakes / Safleoedd Ystlum Sir Benfro a Llynnoedd Bosherston	Pembrokeshire
Pembrokeshire Marine / Sir Benfro Forol	Pembrokeshire
Pen Llyn a'r Sarnau / Lleyn Peninsula and the Sarnau	Ceredigion, Gwynedd, Powys
Preseli	
Rhinog	Gwynedd
Rhos Goch	Powys
Rhos Llawr-cwrt	
Rhos Talglas	
River Dee and Bala Lake / Afon Dyfrdwy a Llyn Tegid (part in England)	Denbighshire, Flintshire, Gwynedd, Wrexham
River Usk / Afon Wysg	Monmouthshire, Newport, Powys
River Wye / Afon Gwy (part in England)	Monmouthshire, Powys
St David's / Ty Ddewi	Pembrokeshire
Severn Estuary / Mor Hafren (part in England)	Cardiff, Monmouthshire, Newport, Vale of Glamorgan
Sugar Loaf Woodlands	
Tanat and Vyrnwy Bat Sites / Safleoedd Ystlumod Tanat ac Efyrnwy	Powys
Usk Bat Sites / Safleoedd Ystlumod Wysg	Blaenau Gwent, Monmouthshire, Powys
Wye Valley and Forest of Dean Bat Sites / Safleoedd Ystlumod Dyffryn Gwy a Fforest y Ddena (part in England)	
Wye Valley Woodlands / Coetiroedd Dyffryn Gwy (part in England)	
Y Fenai a Bae Conwy / Menai Strait and Conwy Bay	
Y Twyni o Abermenai i Aberffraw / Abermenai to Aberffraw Dunes	
Yerbeston Tops	Pembrokeshire

== See also ==
- List of Special Areas of Conservation in England
- List of Special Areas of Conservation in Scotland
- List of Special Areas of Conservation in Northern Ireland

== Sources ==
- JNCC list of UK SACs (accessed on 30 October 2006, revisited 06 Nov 2011)
