= Lashford Lane Fen =

Nature reserve in Dry Sandford, Oxfordshire, England

Coordinates: 51.7067°N 1.3241°W

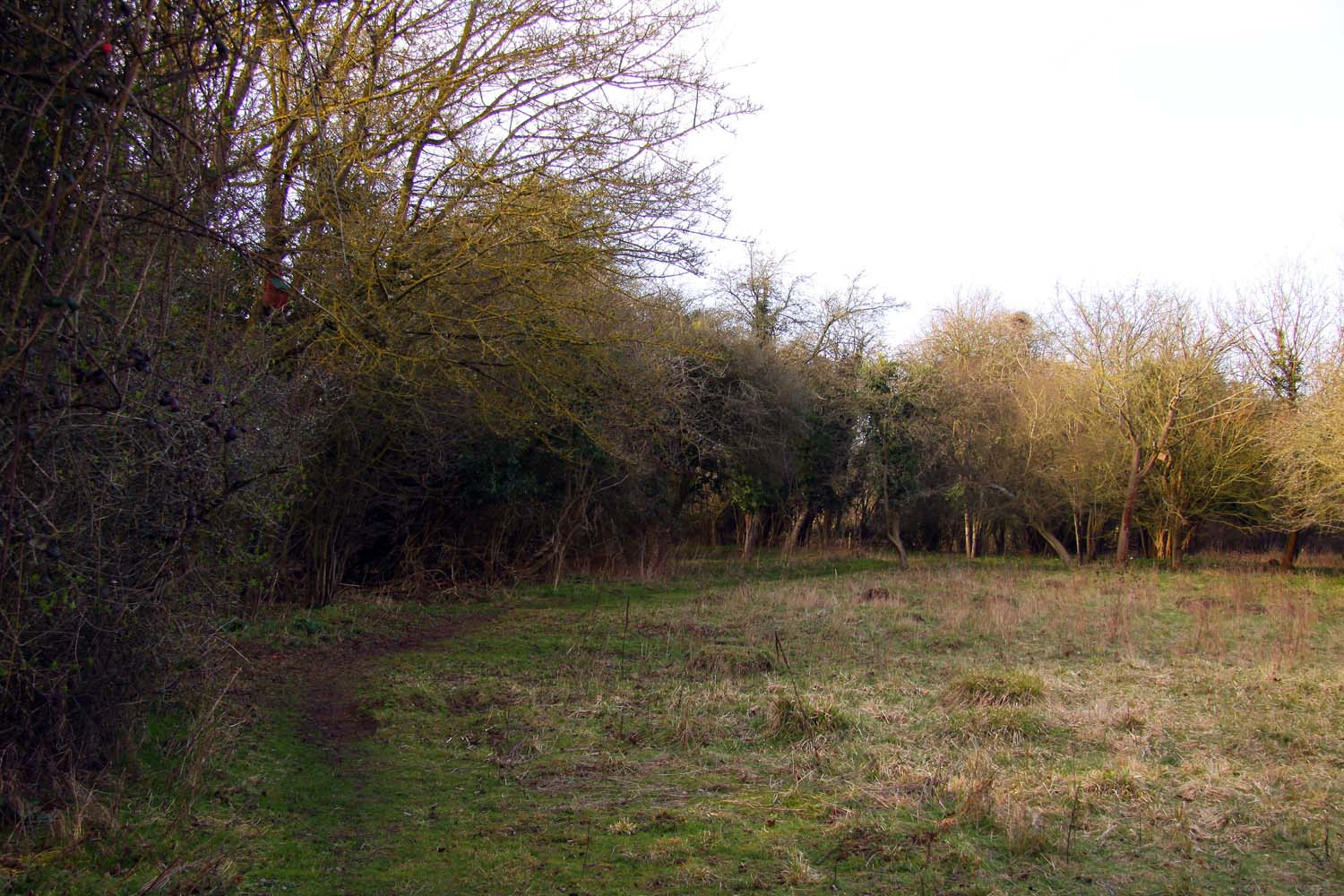
- Interactive map of Lashford Lane Fen
- Type: Nature reserve
- Location: Dry Sandford, Oxfordshire
- OS grid: SP468011
- Area: 7 hectares (17 acres)
- Manager: Berkshire, Buckinghamshire and Oxfordshire Wildlife Trust

Lashford Lane Fen is a 7-hectare (17-acre) nature reserve north of Dry Sandford in Oxfordshire. It is managed by the Berkshire, Buckinghamshire and Oxfordshire Wildlife Trust. It is part of Cothill Fen, which is a Site of Special Scientific Interest and Special Area of Conservation.

Sandford Brook runs through this wet valley, which has limestone grassland, fen, woods, scrub, a pond and reedbeds. Reed buntings winter on the site, and other birds include water rail and reed warblers. There are common frogs and grass snakes.
