= Rex Graham nature reserve =

Site of Special Scientific Interest east of Mildenhall in Suffolk

Coordinates: 52.342°N 0.548°E

Rex Graham Reserve
- Site of Special Scientific Interest
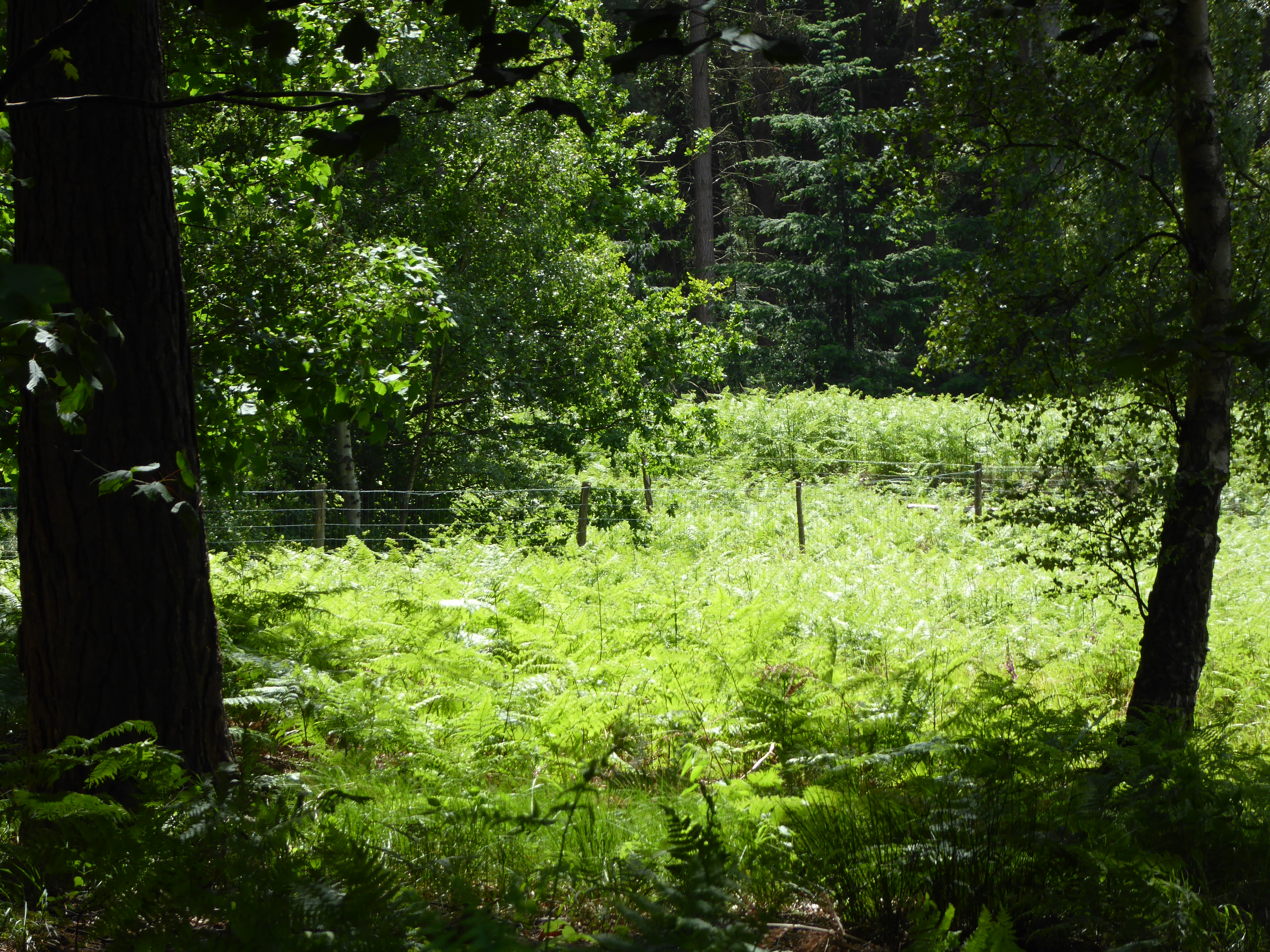
- Location of Rex Graham Reserve.
- Area of search: Suffolk
- Grid reference: TL 737 746
- Interest: Biological
- Area: 2.8 hectares
- Notification date: 1984
- Location map: Magic Map

Rex Graham Reserve is a 2.8-hectare (6.9-acre) biological Site of Special Scientific Interest east of Mildenhall in Suffolk. It is a Special Area of Conservation, and part of the Breckland Special Protection Area. It was formerly managed by the Suffolk Wildlife Trust.

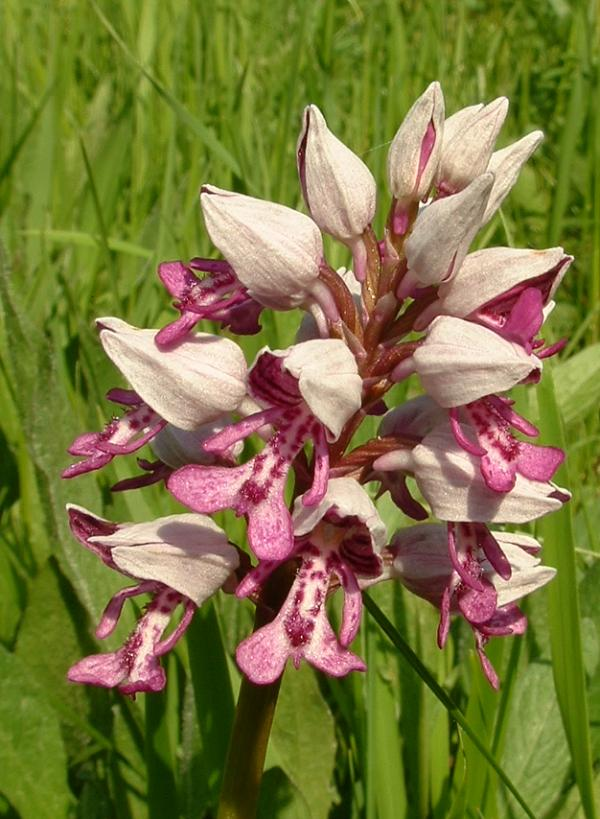
Military Orchid

The site is a disused chalk pit, surrounded by woodland, and is primarily of interest for its population of Military Orchids, as over 95% of the United Kingdom population of this species occurs at this site. Other plants found at the site include mezereon, twayblade, pyramidal orchid, ploughman's spikenard (Inula conyza), and Southern adderstongue.

The discovery of a population of Military Orchids at this site occurred in 1955. Prior to this the species had never been recorded in East Anglia, having previously been recorded only in Southeast England. The population then was at least 500 plants, with over 100 flowering spikes; by 1958 the population had reached 2,854 plants, with about 10% flowering, a population level and flowering proportion that were maintained throughout the 1960s. By 1971 however, only 252 plants were present, due to scrubbing over, as a result of the erection of the protective fence. Scrub clearance and removal of some surrounding trees allowed the population to recover, and subsequent counts include 1,115 plants in 1990 and "too many to count" (Harrap and Harrap 2005) in 2000, when 748 plants were recorded flowering.

Genetic analysis of the orchids at Rex Graham has shown that they are distinct from those at the other two English sites, and represent an independent colonisation from Europe.

All land within the site designated as Rex Graham SSSI is owned by the Forestry Commission.

== Sources ==
- Harrap, Simon and Annie Harrap (2005) Orchids of Britain and Ireland, a field and site guide ISBN 0-7136-6956-X
