= Ardshealach =

Hamlet in Highland, Scotland

Coordinates: 56.73953°N 5.77786°W

- Location within the Lochaber area
- OS grid reference: NM690672
- Council area: Highland
- Country: Scotland
- Sovereign state: United Kingdom
- Post town: ACHARACLE
- Postcode district: PH36
- Police: Scotland
- Fire: Scottish
- Ambulance: Scottish
- UK Parliament: Ross, Skye and Lochaber
- Scottish Parliament: Skye, Lochaber and Badenoch

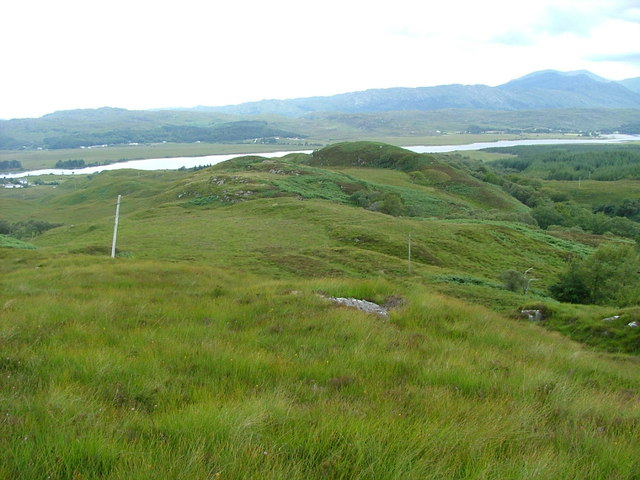
High Green land

Ardshealach (Scottish Gaelic:) is a small hamlet located close to the south west shore of Loch Shiel in Sunart, Lochaber, Highland, less than one mile (1.5 kilometres) southeast of Acharacle. It is in the Scottish council area of the Highland, Scotland.

== See also ==
- Claish Moss
