= Nebria livida angulata =

Scientific classification
- Domain: Eukaryota
- Kingdom: Animalia
- Phylum: Arthropoda
- Class: Insecta
- Order: Coleoptera
- Suborder: Adephaga
- Family: Carabidae
- Genus: Nebria
- Species: N. livida
- Subspecies: N. l. angulata

Trinomial name
- Nebria livida angulata Banninger, 1949

Subspecies of beetle

Nebria livida angulata is a subspecies of beetle in the family Carabidae found in China, North Korea, and Russia.
