= Lydden and Temple Ewell Downs =

Nature reserve in Kent, England

Coordinates: 51.162°N 1.252°E

- Site of Special Scientific Interest
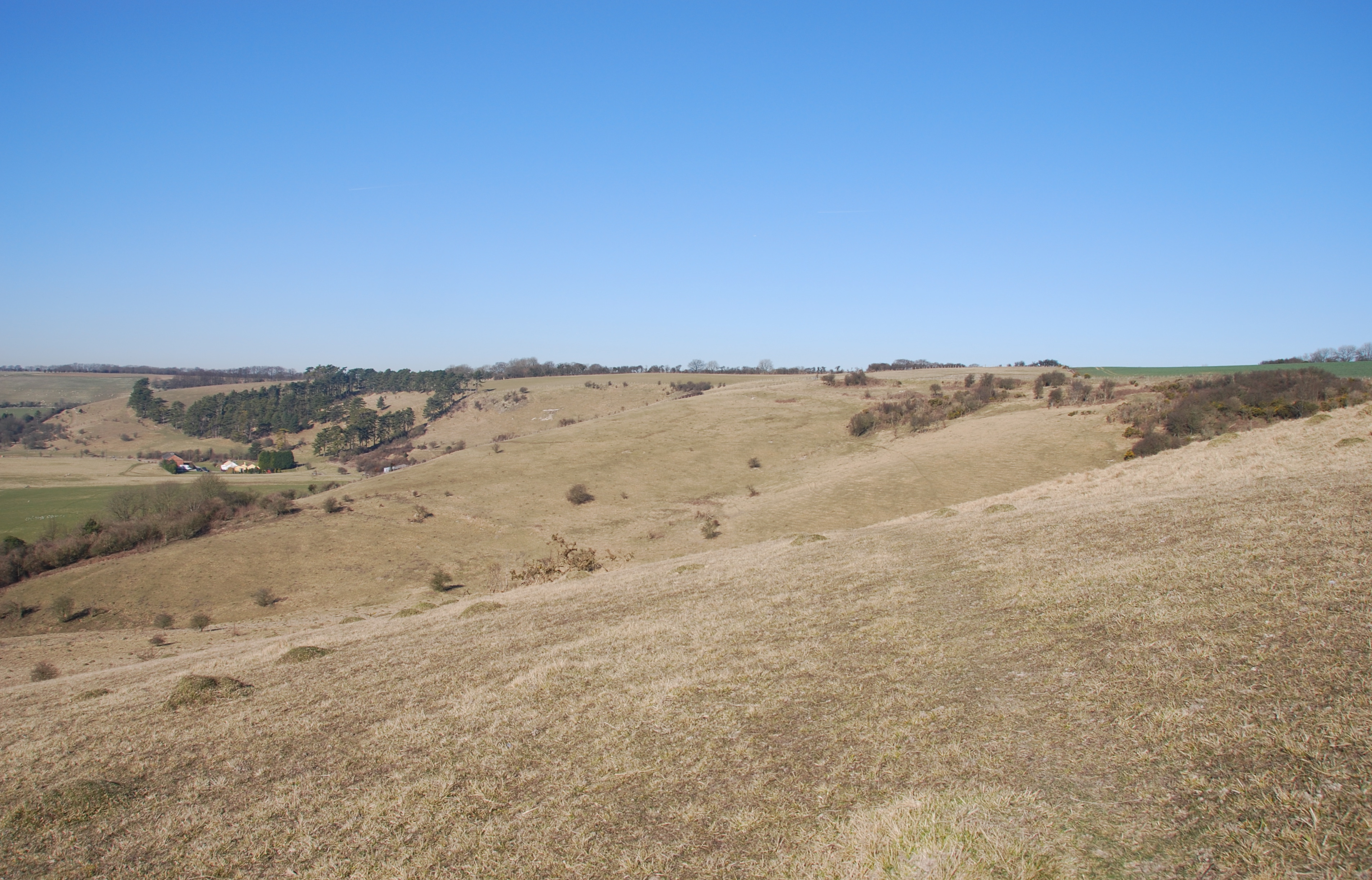
- Location of Lydden and Temple Ewell Downs.
- Area of search: Kent
- Grid reference: TR 275 453
- Interest: Biological
- Area: 63.2 hectares (156 acres)
- Notification date: 1986
- Location map: Magic Map

Lydden and Temple Ewell Downs is a 63.2-hectare (156-acre) biological Site of Special Scientific Interest north-west of Dover in Kent. It is a Special Area of Conservation and Nature Conservation Review site. It is also part of the 78.5-hectare (194-acre) Lydden Temple Ewell National Nature Reserve and the 90-hectare (220-acre) Lydden Temple Ewell nature reserve, which is managed by the Kent Wildlife Trust. It is in the North Downs Area of Outstanding Natural Beauty.

This site has some of the richest chalk downland in the county. The invertebrate community is outstanding, including butterflies such as marbled whites, adonis blue and the very rare silver-spotted skipper. A colony of Periclepsis cinctana, the Dover twist moth, was found at Lydden Temple Ewell in June 2025, the species not having been seen in England since 1952.

There is public access to the site.
