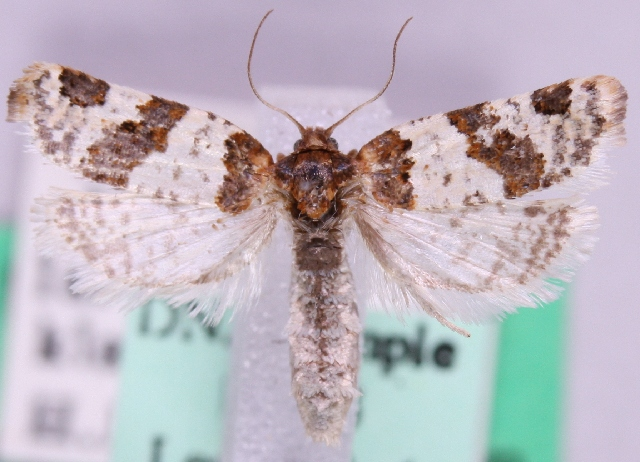

Scientific classification
- Domain: Eukaryota
- Kingdom: Animalia
- Phylum: Arthropoda
- Class: Insecta
- Order: Lepidoptera
- Family: Tortricidae
- Genus: Periclepsis
- Species: P. cinctana

Binomial name
- Periclepsis cinctana ([Denis & Schiffermuller, 1775)

Synonyms
- Tortrix cinctana [Denis & Schiffermuller], 1775; Tortrix albidana Hubner, [1796-1799]; Pyralis ceretana Fabricius, 1787

= Periclepsis cinctana =

Species of moth

Periclepsis cinctana, the Dover twist, is a species of moth of the family Tortricidae found in Europe. It was first described by Michael Denis and Ignaz Schiffermüller in 1775.

== Description ==
The wingspan is 13–17 mm. Adults have been recorded on wing from late April to the beginning of July.

The larvae feed on Lotus, Anthyllis, Genista and Cytisus species from within a tubular silken gallery. The species overwinters in the larval stage.

== Distribution ==
It is found in most of Europe, where it has been recorded from Spain, Great Britain (Kent and the island of Tiree, where it is known as the Tiree Twist), the Benelux, Germany, Denmark, Italy, Switzerland, Austria, the Czech Republic, Slovakia, Slovenia, Poland, Hungary, Bulgaria, Romania, North Macedonia, Norway, Sweden, the Baltic region and Russia.

A colony was found at Kent Wildlife Trust's Lydden Temple Ewell nature reserve, in June 2025, the species not having been seen in England since 1952.

The habitat consists of chalk downlands and calcareous grasslands.
