= Claish Moss =

Blanket bog in Scotland

Coordinates: 56°44′50″N 005°44′50″W

Designations

Ramsar Wetland
- Designated: 24 July 1981
- Reference no.: 218

Claish Moss is an upland blanket bog on the south side of Loch Shiel, in the Sunart district of the west highlands of Scotland.

The Moss is designated as a Ramsar site of international importance (designated in 1981), a Special Area of Conservation (designated together with Kentra Moss), and a Site of Special Scientific Interest.

The remote and difficult to access 568 ha reserve, at an elevation of 11–55 m (average: 22 m), is home to a nationally important population of nine different dragonfly species.

The Moss is an example of a patterned raised mire system in good condition, which are rare in western Europe. Divided by several burns, the ground is very wet and the water quality is excellent. The reserve supports 14 different species of moss, as well as scarce higher plants.

Red deer are culled annually to prevent overgrazing, as they lack natural predators with the extinction of the wolf in Scotland.

Visitors are not encouraged to visit the reserve as it is dangerous to walk over, with the many partially hidden bog pools often being of a great depth. It is in any case difficult to access, except by private boat. The only established footpath to the edge of the reserve is the forestry track at Sròn na Gaoithe, south-east of Ardshealach. There are no paths within the actual reserve.

Due to the inaccessibility of the site, Claish Moss had its status as a national nature reserve removed in 2011.

== See also ==
- National nature reserve (Scotland)
- Ramsar sites in Scotland
- Sites of Special Scientific Interest in South Lochaber
- Special Areas of Conservation in Scotland
