= Dew's Ponds =

Protected area in Suffolk, England

Coordinates: 52.293°N 1.502°E

- Site of Special Scientific Interest
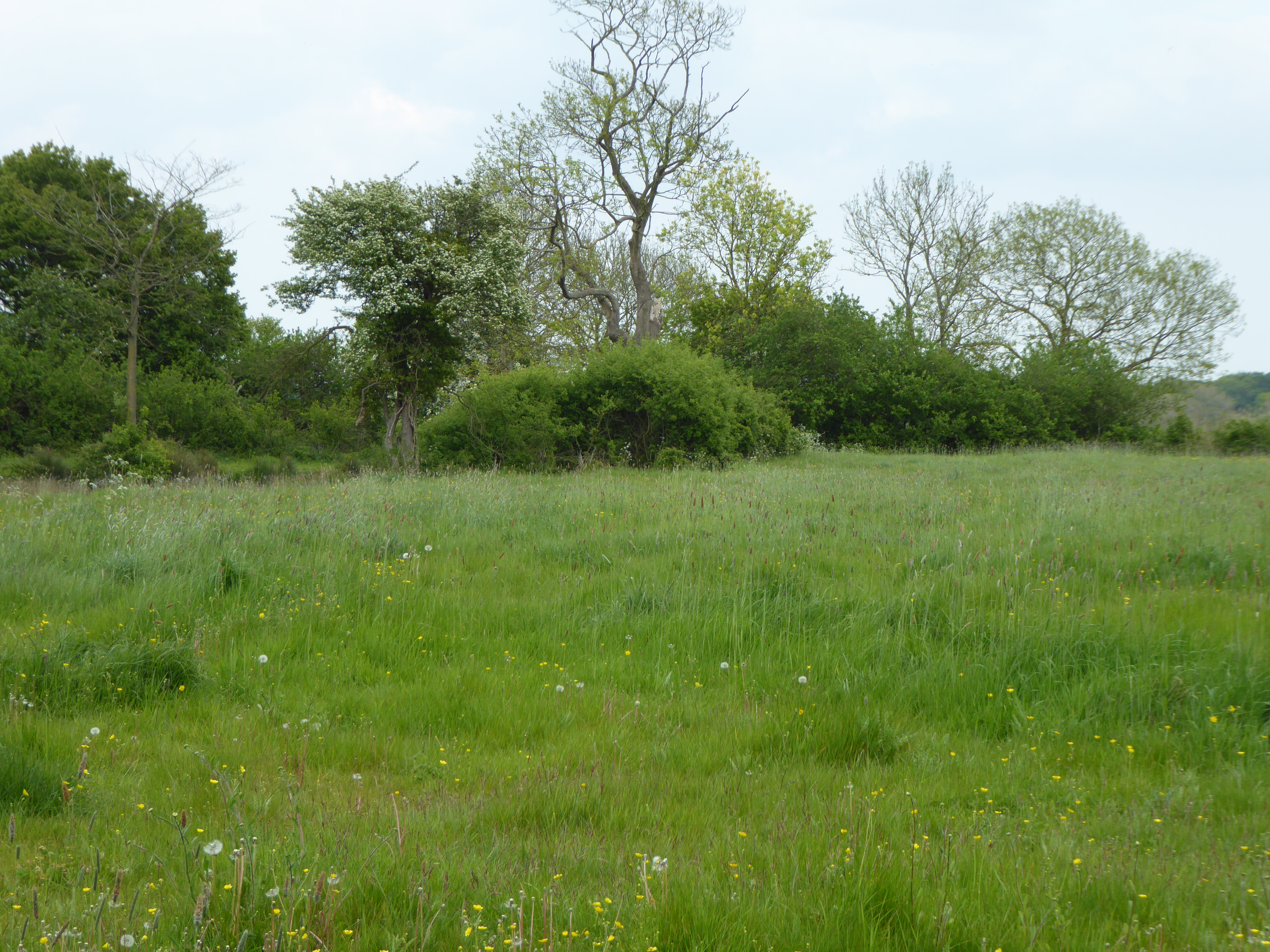
- Location of Dew's Ponds.
- Area of search: Suffolk
- Grid reference: TM 389 719
- Interest: Biological
- Area: 6.7 hectares
- Notification date: 2000
- Location map: Magic Map

Dew's Ponds is a 6.7-hectare (17-acre) biological Site of Special Scientific Interest (SSSI) south of Halesworth in Suffolk. It is a Special Area of Conservation.

This site has a variety of types of grassland, hedges and ditches, on chalk overlain by boulder clay. However, it has been designated an SSSI primarily because it has twelve ponds with one of the largest breeding populations of great crested newts in Britain. There are also grass snakes, smooth newts and slowworms.

The site is private land with no public access.
