= Cothill Fen =

Protected area in Oxfordshire, England

Coordinates: 51.698°N 1.333°W

- Site of Special Scientific Interest
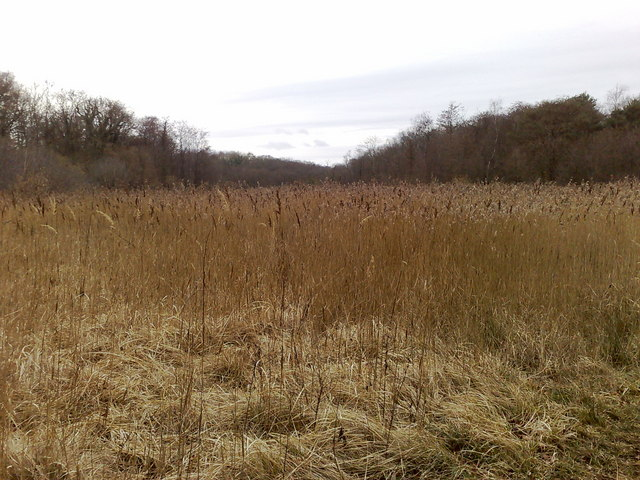
- Location of Cothill Fen.
- Area of search: Oxfordshire
- Grid reference: SP 462 001
- Interest: Biological; Geological
- Area: 43.4 hectares (107 acres)
- Notification date: 1993
- Location map: Magic Map

Cothill Fen is a 43.3-hectare (107-acre) biological and geological Site of Special Scientific Interest north-west of Abingdon-on-Thames in Oxfordshire. It is a Special Area of Conservation and parts of it are a Geological Conservation Review site, a Nature Conservation Review site, Grade 1, and a National Nature Reserve. It also includes two areas which are nature reserves managed by the Berkshire, Buckinghamshire and Oxfordshire Wildlife Trust, Lashford Lane Fen and Parsonage Moor.

This site has nationally rare calcareous fen and moss-rich mire habitats and a rich invertebrate fauna, including 25 species in the Red Data Book of Invertebrates. More than 330 vascular plants have been recorded. It is a nationally important site geologically because the sampling the peat gives a picture of the vegetation over the early Holocene, between 10,000 and 6,500 years ago.
