= Peter's Pit =

Protected area in Kent, England

Coordinates: 51.337°N 0.464°E

- Site of Special Scientific Interest
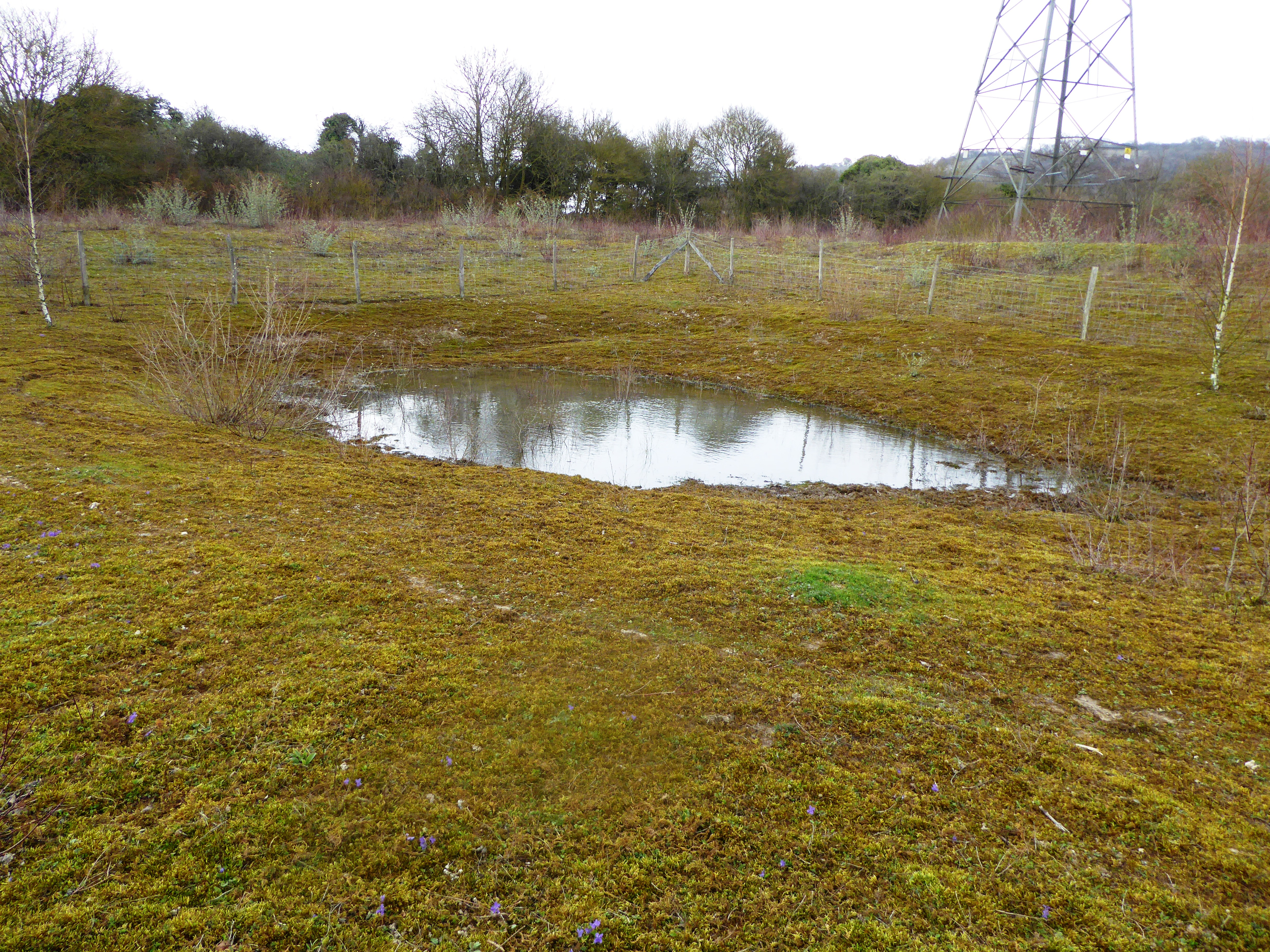
- Location of Peter's Pit.
- Area of search: Kent
- Grid reference: TQ 717 627
- Interest: Biological
- Area: 28.7 hectares (71 acres)
- Notification date: 2000
- Location map: Magic Map

Peter's Pit (or Peters Pit) is a 28.7-hectare (71-acre) biological Site of Special Scientific Interest north-east of Snodland in Kent. It is a Special Area of Conservation

This was formerly a chalk quarry and it has an undulating terrain. There are many ponds, some of which have populations of the great crested newt, a protected species under the Wildlife and Countryside Act 1981. The site has two reptiles, grass snakes and common European adders.

A footpath from Old Church Road goes through the site.
