= Periclepsis accinctana =

Scientific classification
- Domain: Eukaryota
- Kingdom: Animalia
- Phylum: Arthropoda
- Class: Insecta
- Order: Lepidoptera
- Family: Tortricidae
- Genus: Periclepsis
- Species: P. accinctana

Binomial name
- Periclepsis accinctana (Chretien, 1915)

Synonyms
- Eulia accinctana Chretien, 1915; Eulia abdallah LeCerf, 1932; Eulia pierrelovyana Dumont, 1931

Species of moth

Periclepsis accinctana is a species of moth of the family Tortricidae. It is found in North Africa, where it has been recorded from Tunisia and Morocco.
