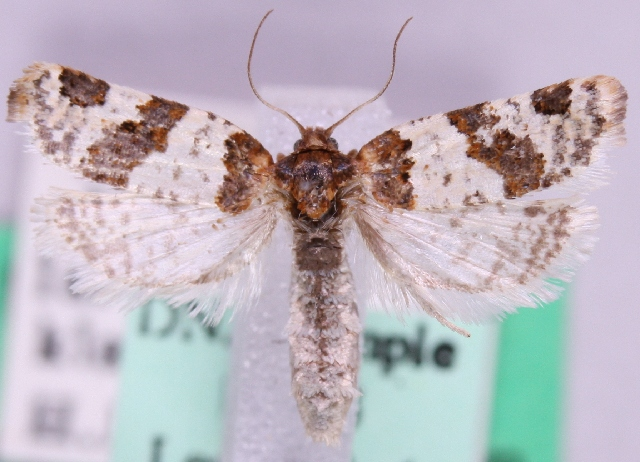
- Periclepsis cinctana

Scientific classification
- Domain: Eukaryota
- Kingdom: Animalia
- Phylum: Arthropoda
- Class: Insecta
- Order: Lepidoptera
- Family: Tortricidae
- Tribe: Archipini
- Genus: Periclepsis; Bradley, 1977

Synonyms
- Paraclepsis Obraztsov, 1954 (preocc.)

= Periclepsis =

Genus of tortrix moths

Periclepsis is a genus of Palaearctic moths belonging to the subfamily Tortricinae of the family Tortricidae.

== Species ==
GBIF includes:

- Periclepsis accinctana (Chretien, 1915)
- Periclepsis cinctana ([Denis & Schiffermuller], 1775)

== See also ==
- List of Tortricidae genera
