= Loch Duich =

Sea loch on the western coast of Scotland

Coordinates: 57°14′N 5°28′W

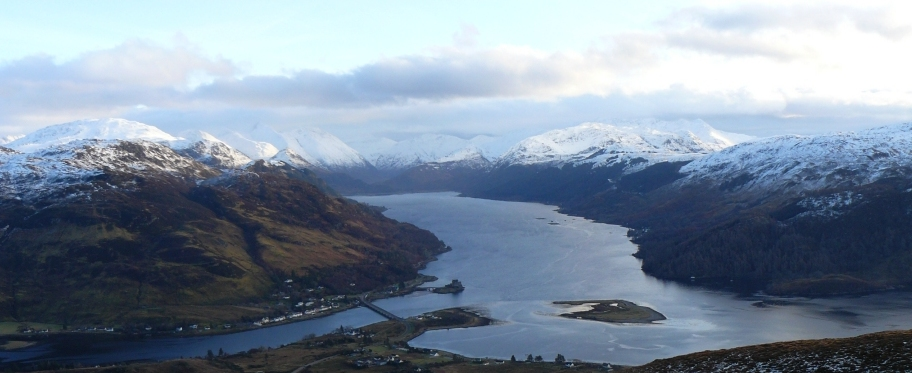
Loch Duich from the north-west, with Eilean Donan Castle (middle foreground), Loch Long (left foreground), Loch Alsh (right foreground), and the mountains of Glen Shiel (centre background)

Loch Duich (Scottish Gaelic: "Loch Dubhthaich") is a sea loch situated on the western coast of Scotland, in the Highlands.

== History ==
In 1719, British forces burned many homesteads along the loch's shores in the month preceding the Battle of Glen Shiel.

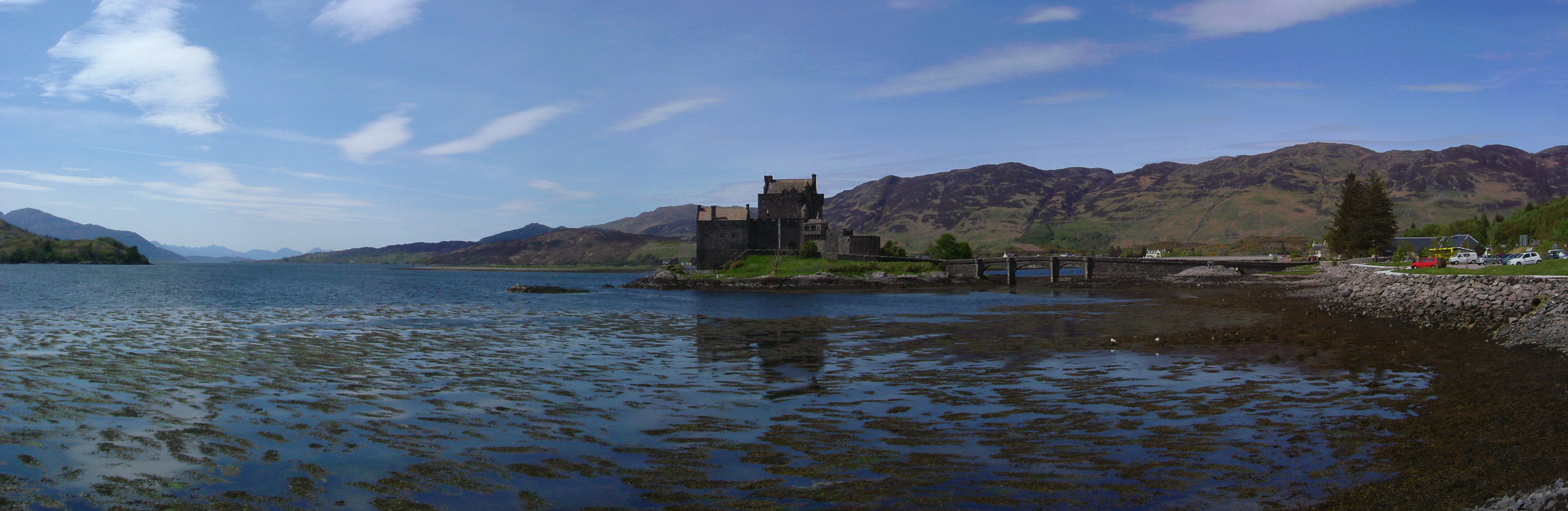
Loch Duich and Eilean Donan Castle, with the Isle of Skye in the distance

The Annual Reports of the Fishery Board for Scotland provide an insight into the state of fishing from Lochs Duich and Long in the years before the First World War.

Fishery Statistics

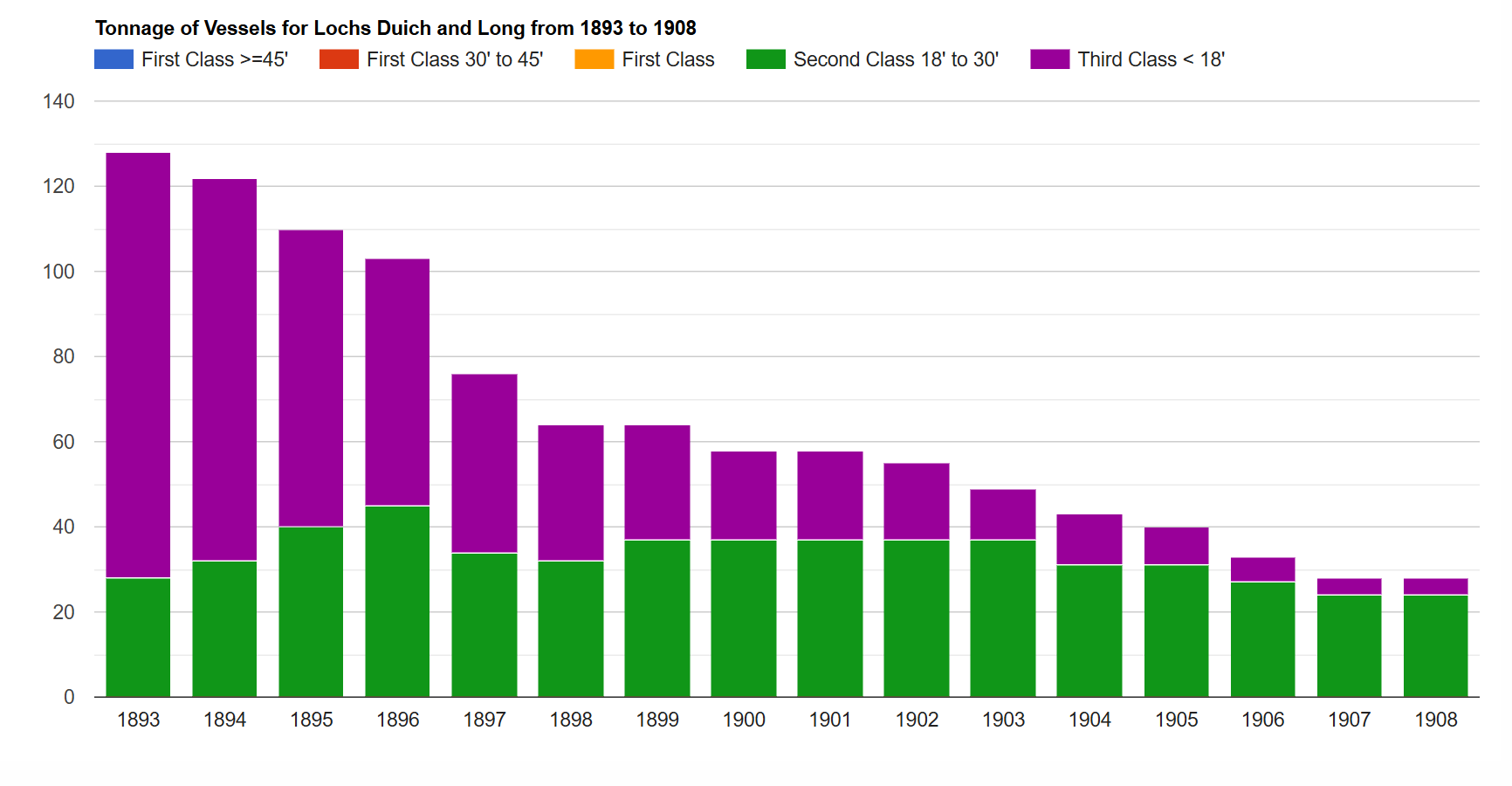
Tonnage of vessels

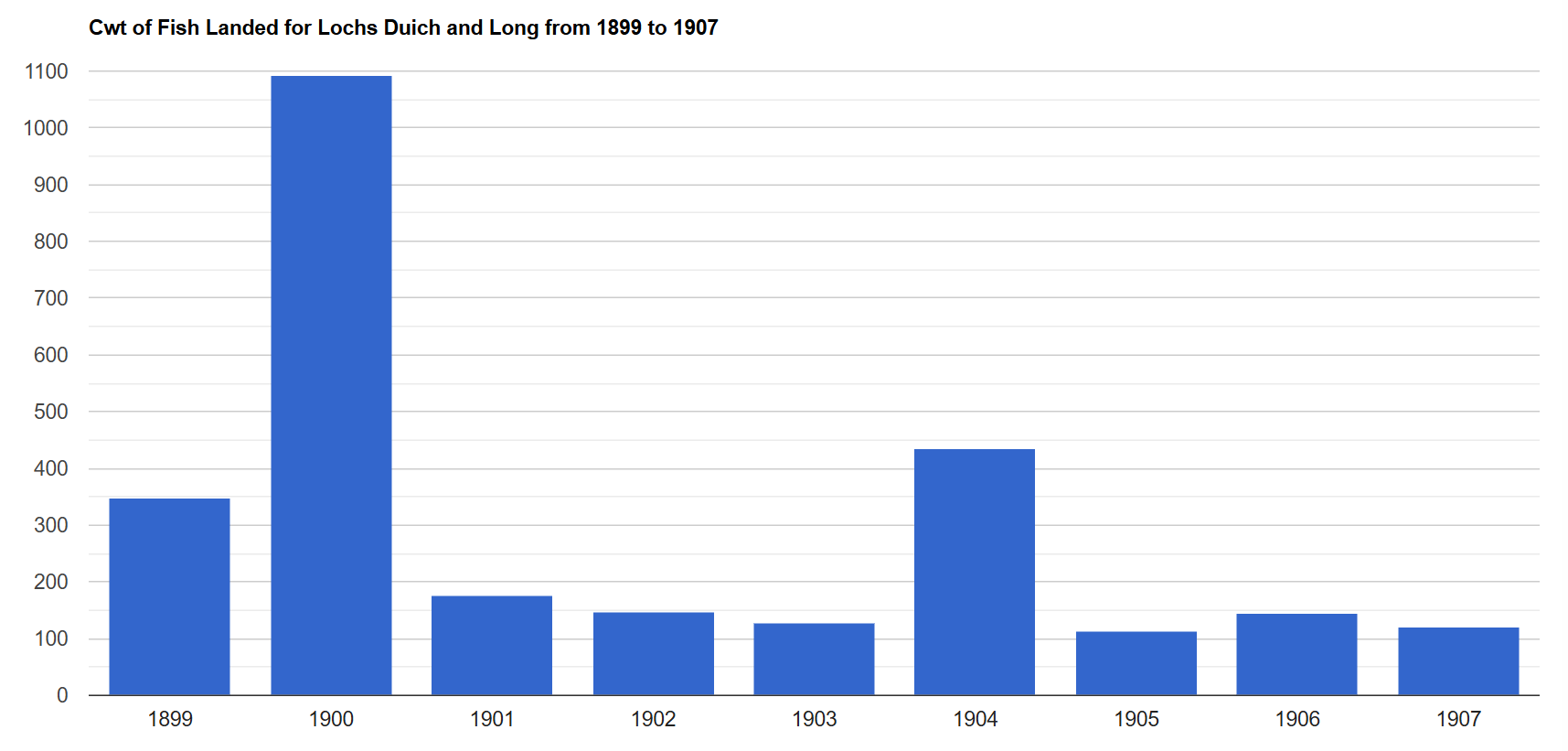
Cwt of fish landed

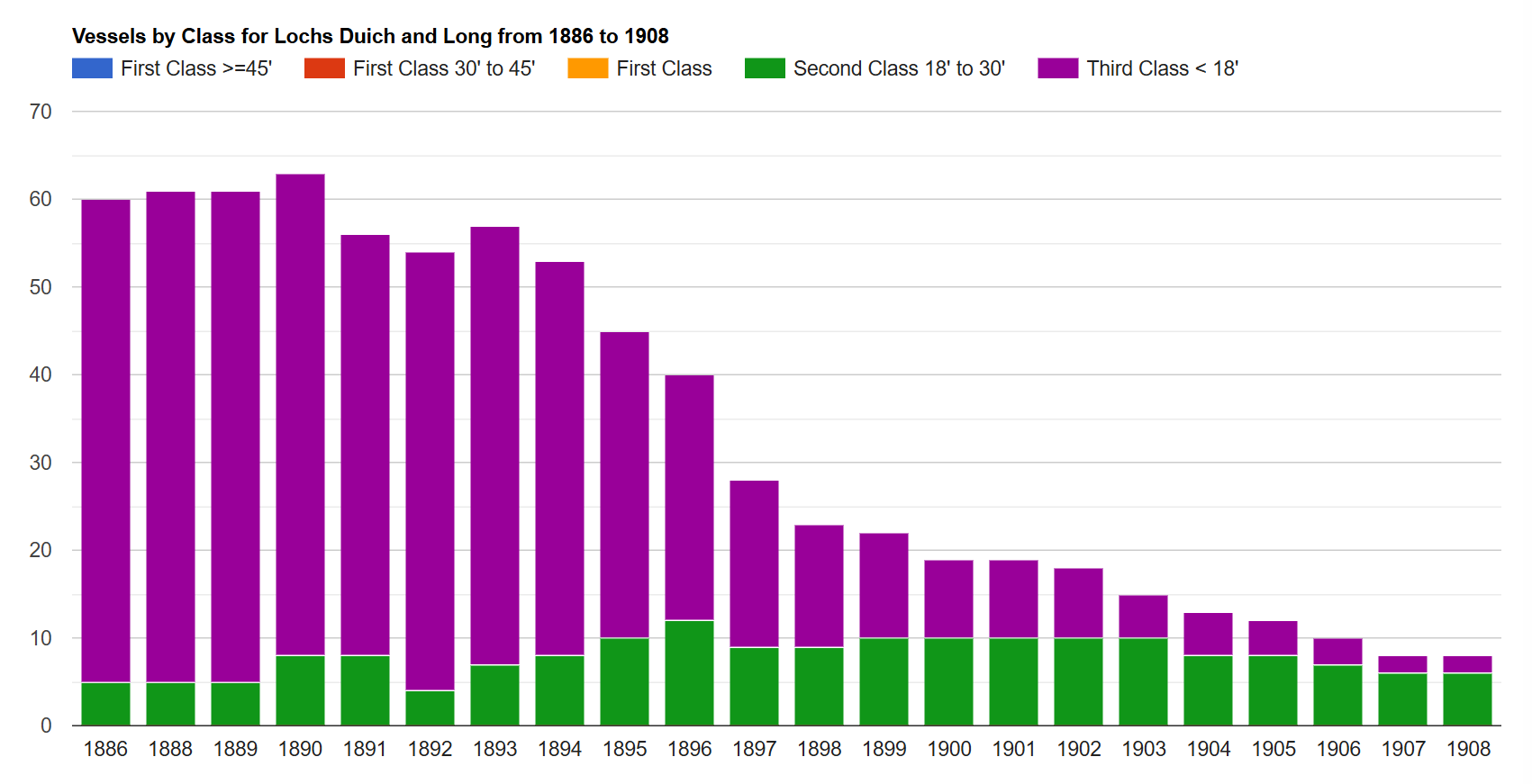
Vessels by class

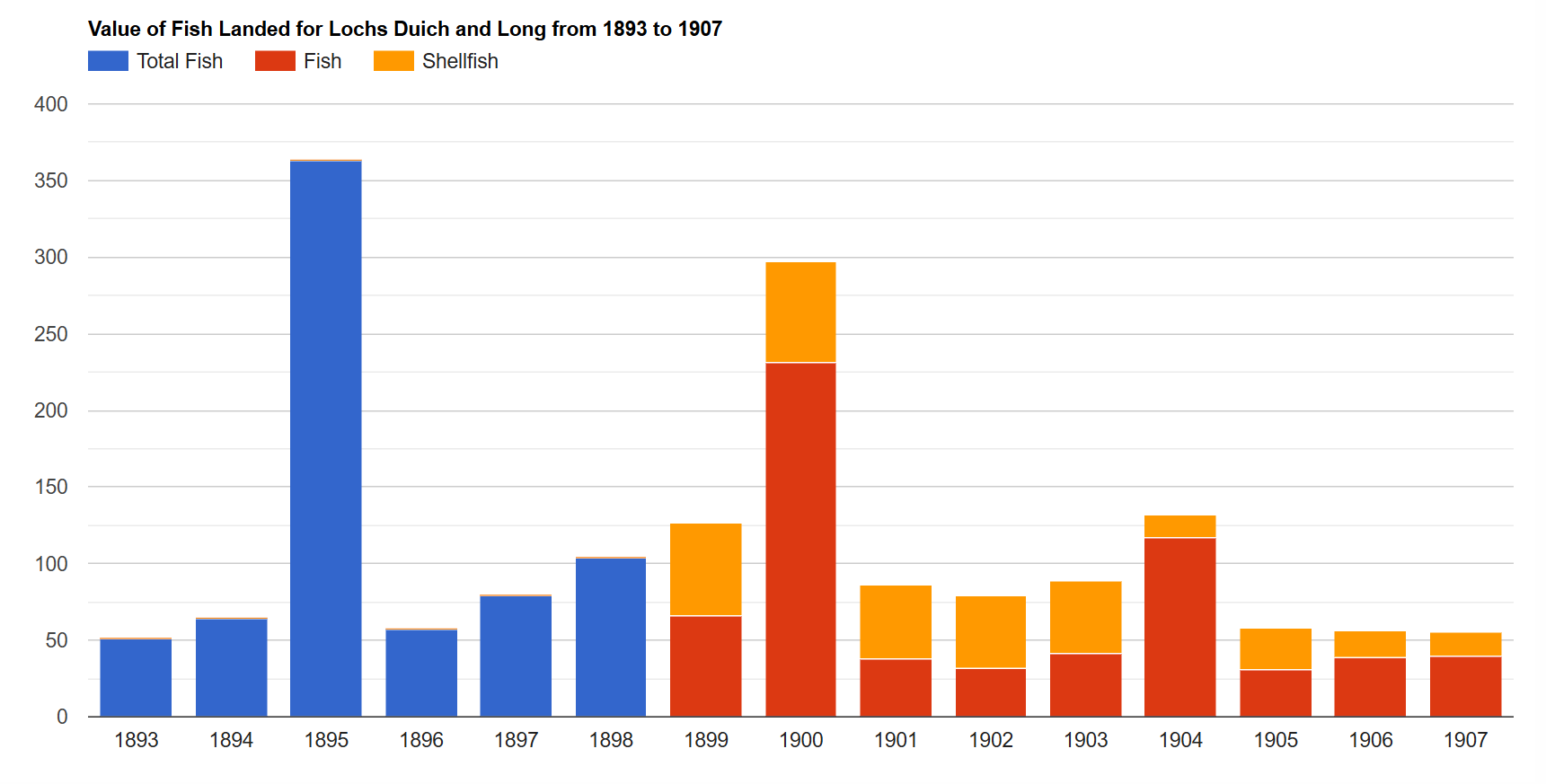
Value (£) of fish landed

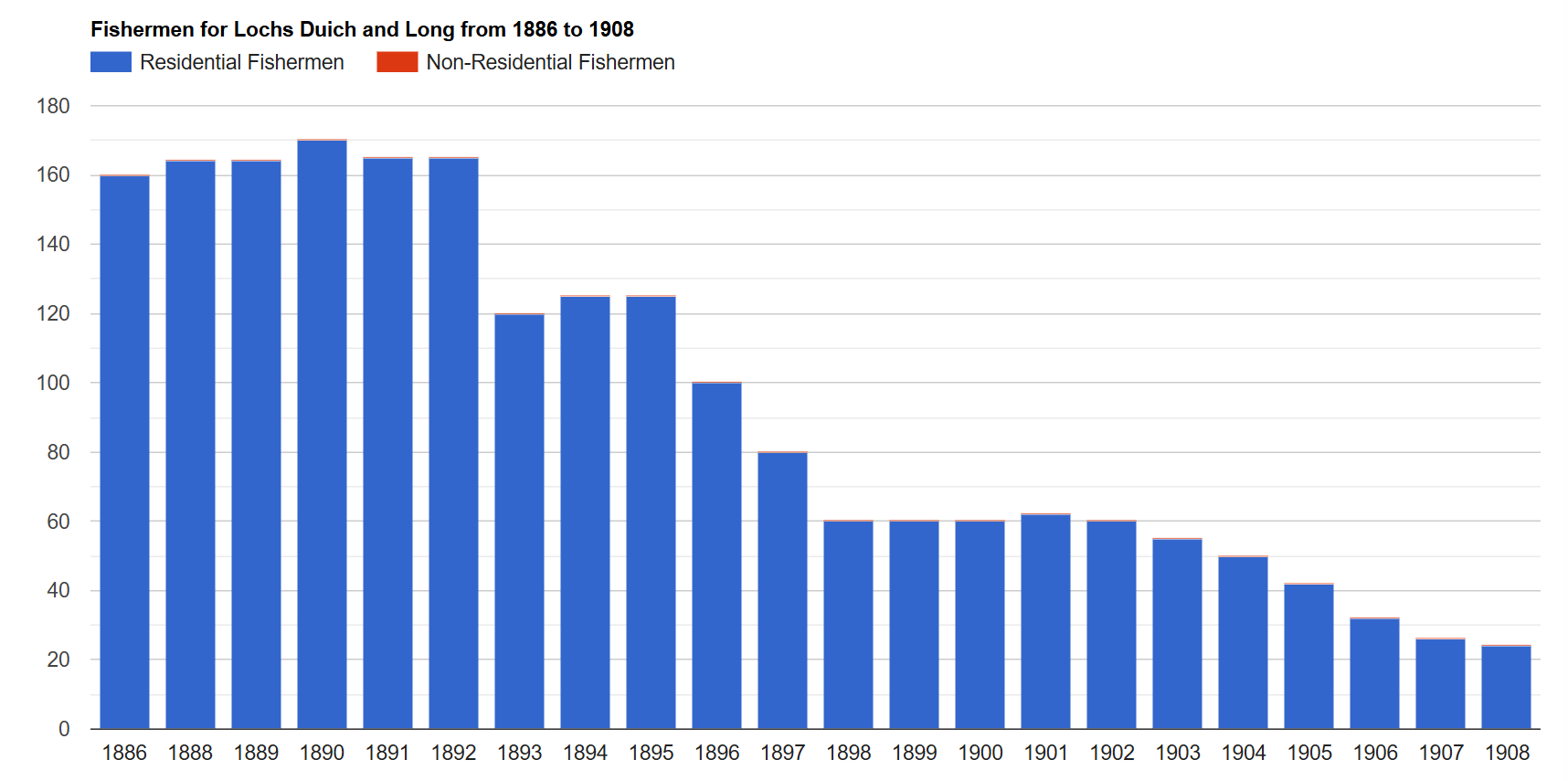
Fishermen

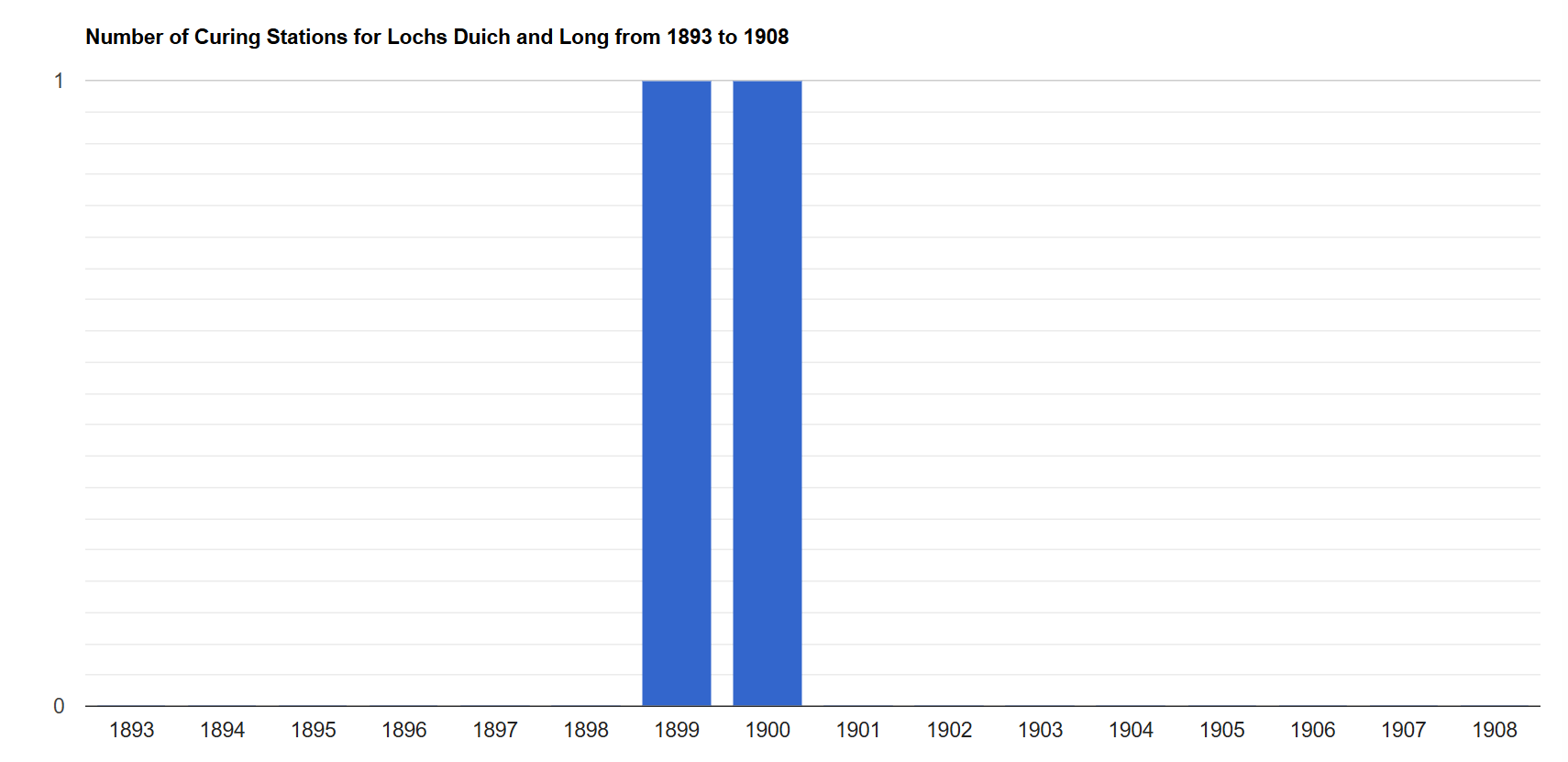
Placeholder- no curing stations

In the report for 1907 we learn that there was "practically nothing doing here. Fishing [had been] a failure for a number of years back. Fishermen prosecute the fishing at the different lochs in the district." The principal kinds of fish landed were herrings and saithe.

== Eilean Donan Castle ==
Eilean Donan Castle stands at the meeting point of Loch Duich, Loch Long, and Loch Alsh.

== Legends ==
A legend connected with Loch Duich states that three brothers who went fishing at the loch one night became enraptured by three seal-maidens who had thrown off their furs, assumed the likeness of humans, and danced in the moonlight on the sands. The brothers stole their furs, intending to claim the seal-maidens as their wives. The youngest brother, however, moved by the seal-girl's distress, returned her sealskin. For his kindness, the girl's father allowed the youngest brother to visit the maiden every ninth night. As for the other two brothers, the middle brother lost his wife after the seal-maiden he had captured found her stolen fur, while the eldest brother burnt his wife's fur as a preventative measure, only to burn her accidentally in the process.

== Connections with Loch Ness ==
The infamous "McRae film" connected with the Loch Ness Monster was supposedly shot as a close-up of not only "Nessie" in its habitat of Loch Ness, but a second film allegedly shows a similar animal in Loch Duich. Both films are, according to most sources, held in a secret trust, and few people have seen either film. It is still a mystery as to whether the films exist at all, but are accepted by several Loch Ness researchers.

== Nature and conservation ==
Loch Duich, along with the neighbouring sea lochs of Loch Long and Loch Alsh, was together designated as a Nature Conservation Marine Protected Area (NCMPA) in 2014. The designation is in place to protect the lochs' burrowed mud and their flame shell beds.
