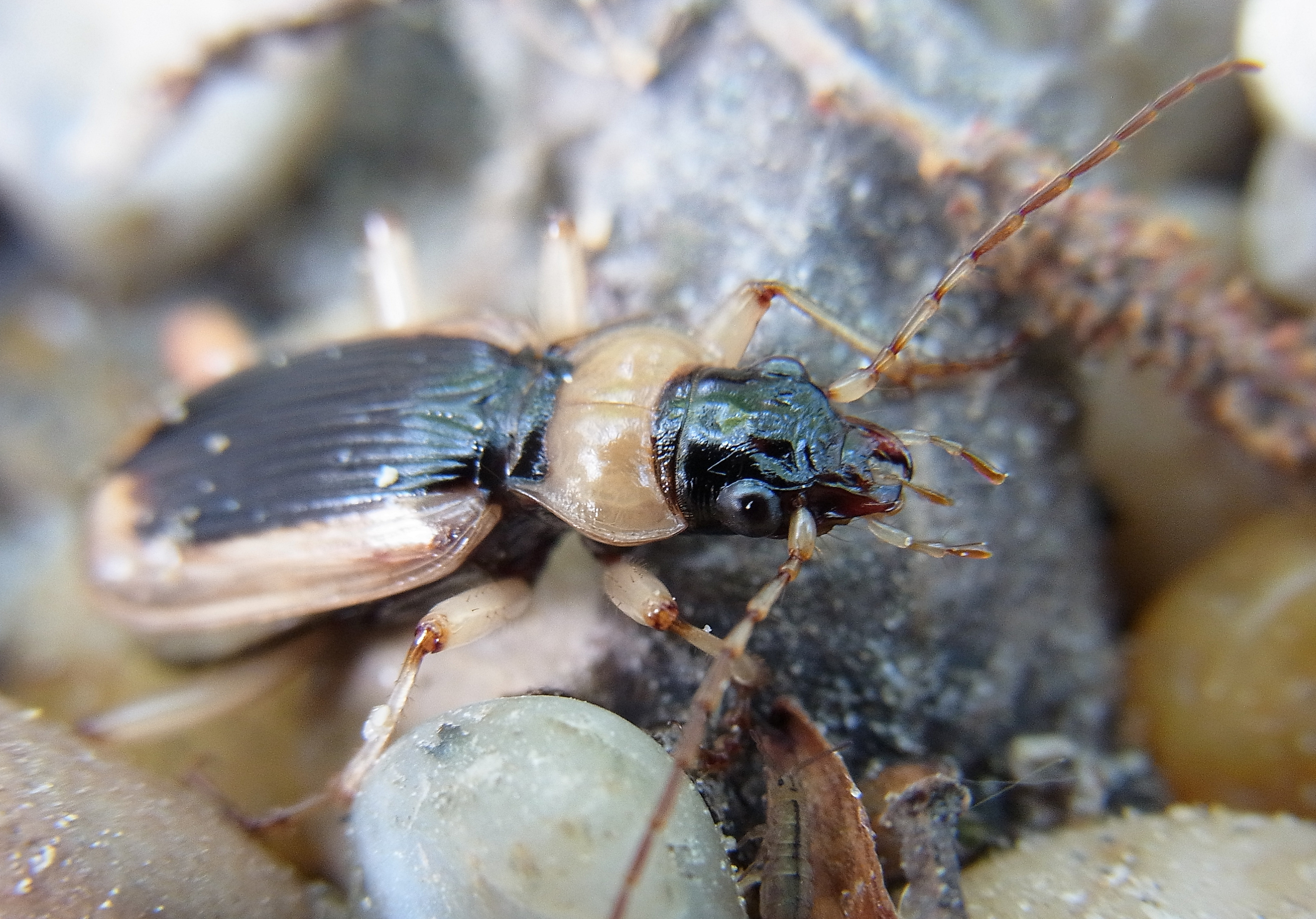
- Nebria livida

Scientific classification
- Kingdom: Animalia
- Phylum: Arthropoda
- Class: Insecta
- Order: Coleoptera
- Suborder: Adephaga
- Family: Carabidae
- Genus: Nebria
- Species: N. livida

Binomial name
- Nebria livida (Linnaeus, 1758)

= Nebria livida =

Species of beetle

Nebria livida is a species of ground beetle with two subspecies:

- Nebria livida angulata Banninger, 1949
- Nebria livida livida (Linnaeus, 1758)

Nebria laticollis angulata is found in China, North Korea, and Russia.

Nebria livida livida is native to the Palearctic realm. In Europe, it is found in Austria, Belarus, Belgium, Great Britain, including the Isle of Man, the Czech Republic, mainland Denmark, Estonia, Finland, mainland France, Germany, Hungary, Kaliningrad, Latvia, Liechtenstein, Moldova, mainland Norway, Poland, Romania, Russia, Slovakia, Sweden, Switzerland, the Netherlands and Ukraine.
