= Emerald network =

Network of Areas of Special Conservation Interest in Europe

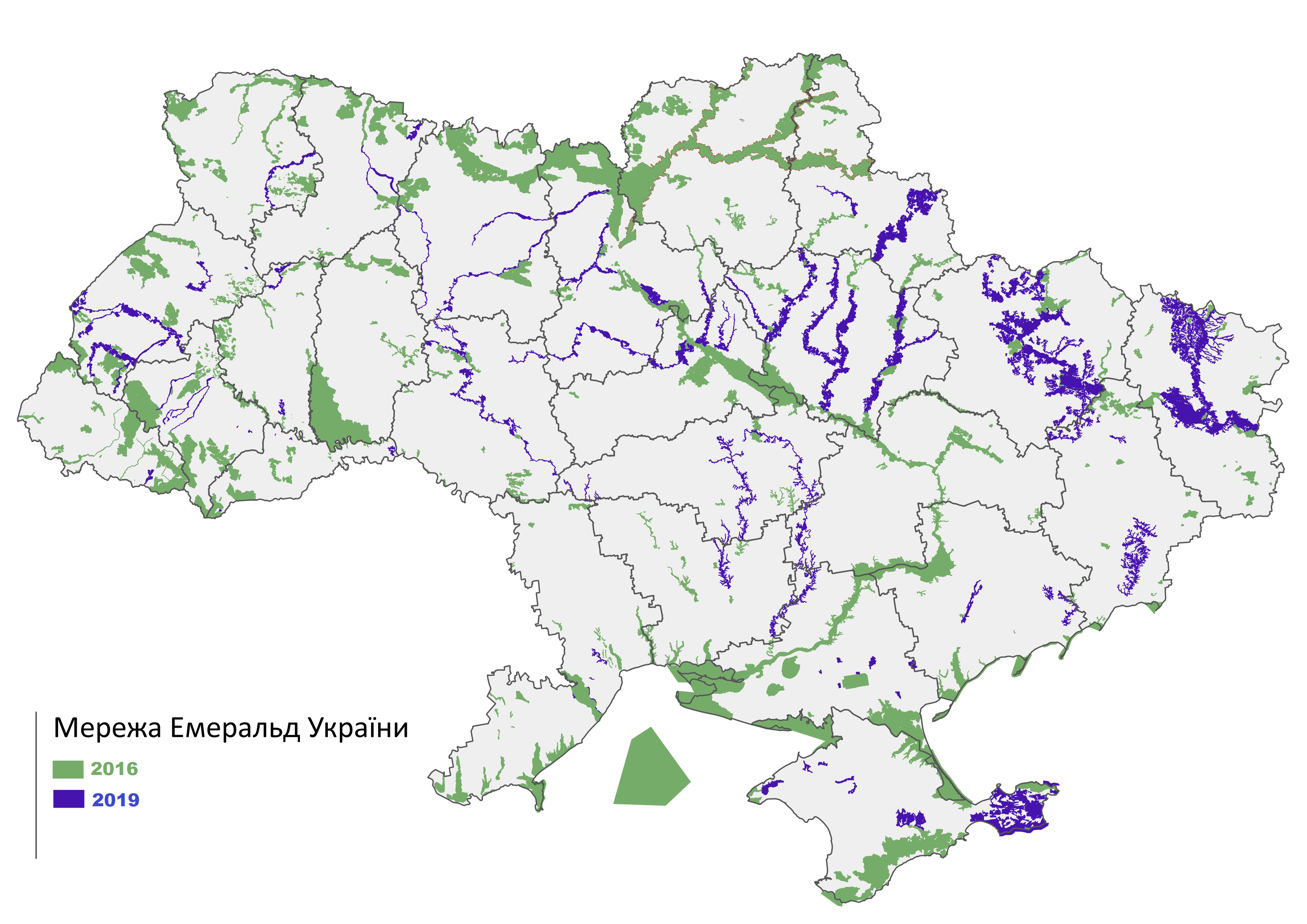
Emerald Network of Ukraine in 2019, the Ukrainian equivalent of Natura 2000, both part of the Emerald network of the Berne Convention on the Conservation of European Wildlife and Natural Habitats.

The Emerald network is a network of Areas of Special Conservation Interest to conserve wild flora and fauna and their natural habitats of Europe, which was launched in 1989 by the Council of Europe as part of its work under the Berne Convention on the Conservation of European Wildlife and Natural Habitats that came into force on 1 June 1982. It is to be set up in each Contracting Party or observer state to the convention.

The Bern Convention is signed by the 46 member states of the Council of Europe, together with the European Union, Monaco, Burkina Faso, Morocco, Tunisia and Senegal. Algeria, Belarus, Bosnia and Herzegovina, Cape Verde, Vatican City, San Marino and Russia are among non-signatories that have observer status at meetings of the committee.

The European Union, as such, is also a Contracting Party to the Bern Convention. In order to fulfil its obligations arising from the convention, particularly in respect of habitat protection, it produced the Habitats Directive in 1992 and subsequently set up the Natura 2000 network. The Emerald Network of Ukraine was developed in 2009–2019, and essentially serves as Ukraine's version of Natura 2000, which it seeks to join as part of its candidate membership of the European Union.

The development of the Emerald Network in Africa has started with the implementation of pilot projects in Burkina Faso, Senegal and Morocco (ongoing). The Emerald Network could also be launched in Tunisia, at the request of the national authorities.

== See also ==
- Colored walls or corridors
  - Aquatic organism passage
  - Wildlife corridor, green corridor
  - Wildlife crossing, green crossing
- Ecological network
  - Biogeographic regions of Europe
