= Area of Special Conservation Interest =

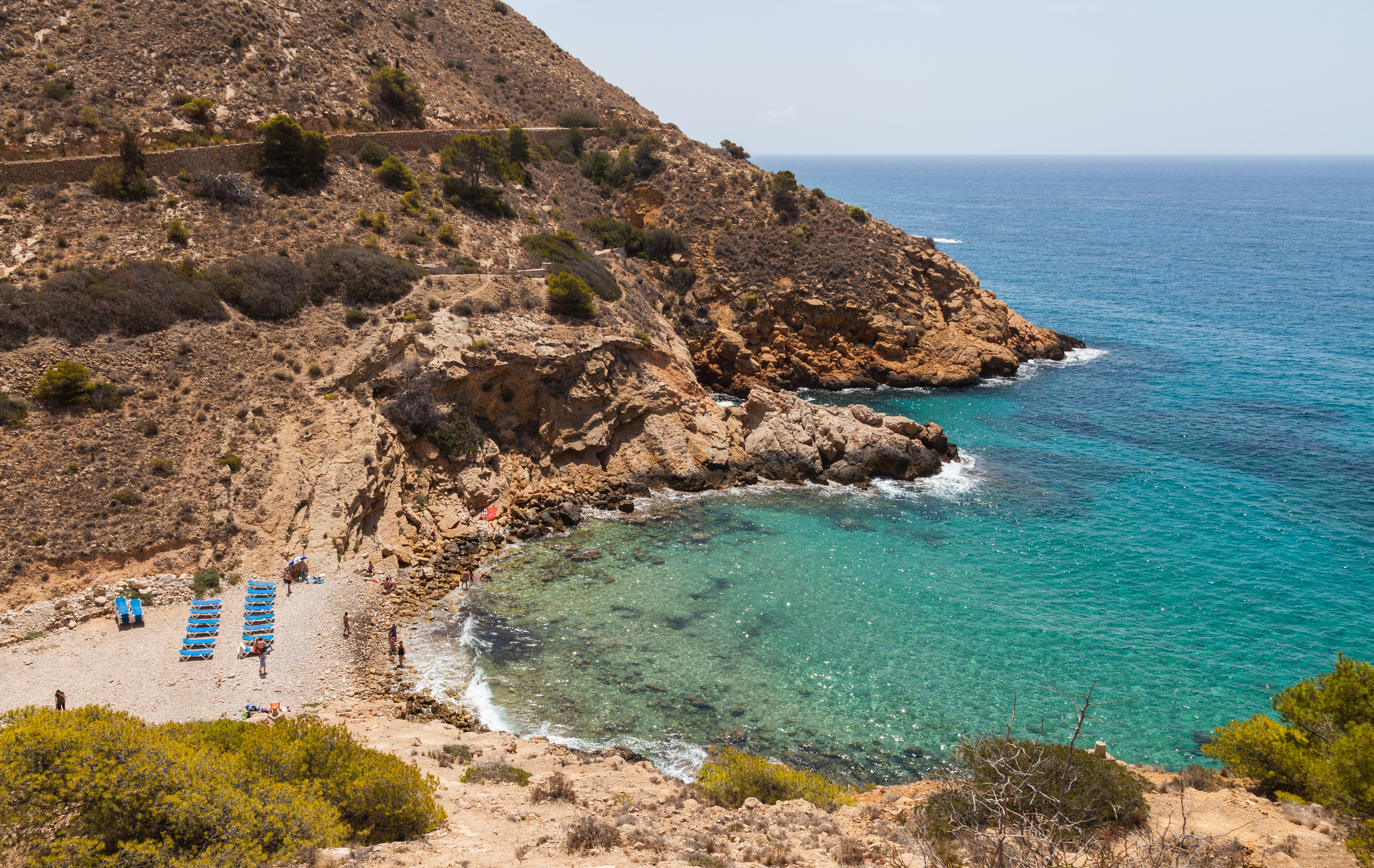
Cala Tío Ximo, Benidorm, Spain

An Area of Special Conservation Interest (ASCI) is a protected area in Europe or North Africa, part of the Emerald network established by the countries who have signed the Berne Convention on the Conservation of European Wildlife and Natural Habitats. The purpose of the ASCIs is to conserve and protect habitats and species defined in the convention.

== Emerald Network ==
The Emerald Network is an ecological network of Areas of Special Conservation Interest. The Council of Europe launched the network when it adopted Recommendation No. 16 (1989) of the Standing Committee to the Bern Convention. The European Union's Natura 2000 network covers the portion of the Emerald network within the EU. The network also include conservation units in non-community European states such as Andorra, Belarus, Georgia, the Republic of Moldova, Norway, Switzerland and Ukraine, and in several African states. In the United Kingdom, Special Areas of Conservation and Special Protection Areas are Areas of Special Conservation Interest. The African signatories to the Bern Convention include Burkina Faso, Morocco, Tunisia and Senegal.

== Criteria ==
An ASCI should meet one or more of the following criteria as defined at UNEP-WCMC 2014, Biodiversity A-Z website: www.biodversitya-z.org, UNEP-WCMC, Cambridge, UK:

- Contributes substantially to the survival of threatened species, endemic species, or any species listed in Appendices I and II of the Bern convention;
- Supports significant numbers of species in an area of high species diversity or supports important populations of one or more species;
- Contains an important and/or representative sample of endangered habitat types;
- Contains an outstanding example of a particular habitat type or a mosaic of different habitat types;
- Represents an important area for one or more migratory species;
- Otherwise contributes substantially to the achievement of the objectives of the convention.

== Sources ==
- "Areas of Special Conservation Interest (Emerald Network) (ASCI)", Biodiversity A-Z, UN Environment Programme World Conservation Monitoring Centre
- Emerald Network of Areas of Special Conservation Interest, Council of Europe
- Emerald Network, Government of Malta, archived from the original on 2019-12-28
- Special Areas of Conservation – overview, JNCC : Joint Nature Conservation Committee
