= Loch Long, Highlands =

Coordinates: 57°18′46.1″N 5°27′45.3″W

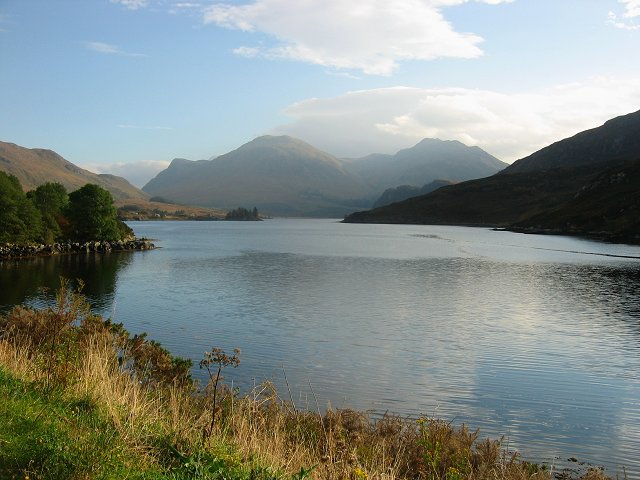
- Loch Long, looking towards Ben Killilan and Sgumain Coinntich

- Location within Highland
- Location: Highland Council area, Scotland
- Type: sea inlet
- Primary inflows: River Elchaing
- Primary outflows: Junction of Loch Alsh and Loch Duich
- Basin countries: Scotland, Great Britain
- Max. length: 2,440 km (1,520 mi)
- Max. width: 1,940 km (1,210 mi)
- Surface elevation: 0 m (0 ft)
- Islands: 2 Islets

Loch Long is a sea loch situated on the western coast of Scotland, in the Highlands. It is a popular destination for tourists and fishers.

The nearby Eilean Donan Castle stands at the confluence of Loch Long, Loch Duich and Loch Alsh.

Loch Long, Loch Duich and Loch Alsh were together designated as a Nature Conservation Marine Protected Area in 2014. The designation is in place to protect the lochs' burrowed mud and their flame shell beds.
