= List of Special Areas of Conservation in Northern Ireland =

Special Areas of Conservation in Northern Ireland are part of the European Union's Natura 2000 network of sites with special flora or fauna.

Northern Ireland has 54 SACs:

Name	LocalAuthority	Centroid (IGRS)	Area (ha)	EU Code
Aughnadarragh Lough	Down	J442593	12.80	UK0030318
Ballykilbeg	Down	J447406	37.59	UK0030319
Ballynahone Bog	Londonderry	H860981	243.24	UK0016599
Banagher Glen	Londonderry	C672045	87.77	UK0030083
Bann Estuary	Londonderry	C797363	347.94	UK0030084
Binevenagh	Londonderry	C686309	90.79	UK0030089
Black Bog	Tyrone	H635810	183.42	UK0016609
Breen Wood	Antrim	D123336	36.01	UK0030097
Carn-Glenshane Pass	Londonderry	C788075	1,938.78	UK0030110
Cladagh (Swanlinbar) River	Fermanagh	H241301	28.30	UK0030116
Cranny Bogs	Tyrone	H424640	78.90	UK0030321
Cuilcagh Mountain	Fermanagh	H127305	2,744.45	UK0016603
Curran Bog	Londonderry	H872954	183.31	UK0030322
Dead Island Bog	Londonderry	C931053	54.56	UK0030323
Deroran Bog	Tyrone	H524713	75.46	UK0030324
Derryleckagh	Down	J119254	48.69	UK0016620
Eastern Mournes	Down	J328270	7,507.03	UK0016615
Fairy Water Bogs	Tyrone	H340772	223.70	UK0016611
Fardrum and Roosky Turloughs	Fermanagh	H180502	43.10	UK0030068
Garron Plateau	Antrim	D240190	4,650.07	UK0016606
Garry Bog	Antrim	C940305	154.76	UK0016610
Hollymount	Down	J464438	49.95	UK0030169
Largalinny	Fermanagh	H074537	244.87	UK0030045
Lecale Fens	Down	J451387	40.87	UK0030180
Lough Melvin	Fermanagh	G921532	516.43	UK0030047
Magheraveely Marl Loughs	Fermanagh	H478269	58.78	UK0016621
Magilligan	Londonderry	C686371	1,058.22	UK0016613
Main Valley Bogs	Antrim	D034195	186.20	UK0030199
Monawilkin	Fermanagh	H090533	174.78	UK0016619
Moneygal Bog	Tyrone	H238883	155.79	UK0030211
Moninea Bog	Fermanagh	H299215	44.74	UK0030212
Montiaghs Moss	Antrim	J091654	151.28	UK0030214
Murlough	Down	J445313	11,902.03	UK0016612
North Antrim Coast	Antrim	D022440	314.59	UK0030224
Owenkillew River	Tyrone	H559870	213.46	UK0030233
Peatlands Park	Tyrone	H907608	207.30	UK0030236
Pettigoe Plateau	Fermanagh	G988634	1,264.32	UK0016607
Rathlin Island	Antrim	D133518	3,344.62	UK0030055
Rea`s Wood and Farr`s Bay	Antrim	J141857	41.81	UK0030244
River Faughan and Tributaries		C513087	293.27	UK0030361
River Foyle and Tributaries	Tyrone	H353876	770.12	UK0030320
River Roe and Tributaries	Londonderry	C687159	407.60	UK0030360
Rostrevor Wood	Down	J186173	16.63	UK0030268
Slieve Beagh	Fermanagh; Tyrone	H524447	1,884.68	UK0016622
Slieve Gullion	Armagh	J023210	612.13	UK0030277
Strangford Lough	Down	J559577	15,398.54	UK0016618
Teal Lough	Londonderry; Tyrone	H737879	198.22	UK0016608
Tonnagh Beg Bog	Tyrone	H412599	55.60	UK0030325
Tully Bog	Tyrone	H419754	35.99	UK0030326
Turmennan	Down	J485503	14.83	UK0030291
Upper Ballinderry River	Tyrone	H734792	58.80	UK0030296
Upper Lough Erne	Fermanagh	H329279	5,738.38	UK0016614
West Fermanagh Scarplands	Fermanagh	H085491	2,270.35	UK0030300
Wolf Island Bog	Londonderry	C922080	118.02	UK0030303

== See also ==
- Special Area of Conservation
- Special Protection Area
