= Special Area of Conservation =

Protected area in the European Union under the Habitats Directive

A Special Area of Conservation (SAC) is defined in the European Union's Habitats Directive (92/43/EEC), also known as the Directive on the Conservation of Natural Habitats and of Wild Fauna and Flora. They are to protect the 220 habitats and approximately 1,000 species listed in annex I and II of the directive which are considered to be of European interest following criteria given in the directive. They must be chosen from the Sites of Community Importance by the member states and designated SAC by an act assuring the conservation measures of the natural habitat.

SACs complement Special Protection Areas and together form a network of protected sites across the European Union called Natura 2000. This, in turn, is part of the Emerald network of Areas of Special Conservation Interest (ASCIs) under the Berne Convention.

== Assessment methodology in the United Kingdom ==
Prior to being designated as a Special Area of Conservation (SAC), sites have been assessed under a two-stage process set out by the Joint Nature Conservation Committee. The value of the proposed site is considered in relation to the whole national resource of each habitat type and of each species.

=== Stage one ===
Firstly, assessment of the relative importance of sites containing examples of the individual habitat types. Four criteria are used:

- the degree of representativity;
- the area;
- the degree of conservation of habitat structure and functions;
- restoration possibilities and a global assessment of conservation value (i.e. an overall assessment).

Secondly, species assessment evaluates population size and density, the degree of conservation of the features of the habitat that are important for the species and restoration possibilities, the degree of isolation of the population in relation to the species' natural range and a global assessment of conservation value.

=== Stage two ===
This stage is often informally referred to as 'moderation'. The criteria used in Stage 2 are intended to be used to assess the sites at the level of the nine biogeographical regions and the EU as a whole. The Stage 2 criteria may be summarised as:

- relative value of the site at national level;
- relationship of the site to migration routes or its role as part of an ecosystem on both sides of one or more Community frontiers;
- total area of the site;
- number of habitat types and species present;
- global ecological value of the site at the level of the biogeographical region and/or EU as a whole.

== See also ==
- List of Special Areas of Conservation in the Republic of Ireland
- List of Special Areas of Conservation in Northern Ireland
- List of Special Areas of Conservation in England
- List of Special Areas of Conservation in Scotland
- List of Special Areas of Conservation in Wales
- Conservation designations
- Index of conservation articles
- Area of Outstanding Natural Beauty (AONB)
- Environmentally Sensitive Area (ESA)
- Heritage coast
- Protected area
- Scheduled monument
- Site of Special Scientific Interest (SSSI)
- World Heritage Site
