= Pease Dean =

Nature reserve in the Scottish Borders area of Scotland

Coordinates: 55.9268°N 2.3364°W

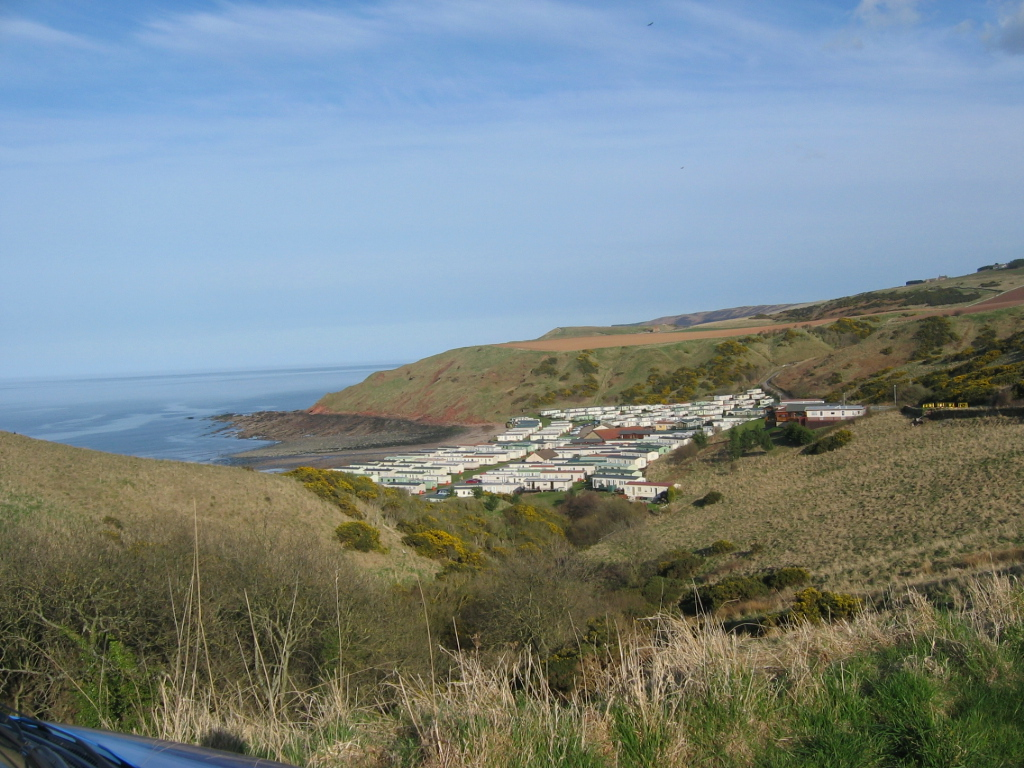
Pease Bay

Pease Dean is a nature reserve at Pease Bay, in the Scottish Borders area of Scotland, near the Anglo-Scottish border and Cockburnspath, Cove, and Dunglass. OS 67 NT794707.

The reserve is managed by the Scottish Wildlife Trust and has two parts: Pease Burn and Tower Burn. Pease Burn is open grassland, with gorse and alder. Tower Burn consists of mixed woodland.

== Pease Bridge ==
The 130-foot-tall (39.6 m) Pease Bridge, built in 1786, was the highest bridge of its kind in the world at the time of construction.

== See also ==
- List of Sites of Special Scientific Interest in Tweeddale and Ettrick and Lauderdale
- List of Sites of Special Scientific Interest in Berwickshire and Roxburgh
- Scottish Wildlife Trust
- Southern Upland Way
- List of places in the Scottish Borders
