= Berwickshire Coastal Path =

Great Trail in Scotland

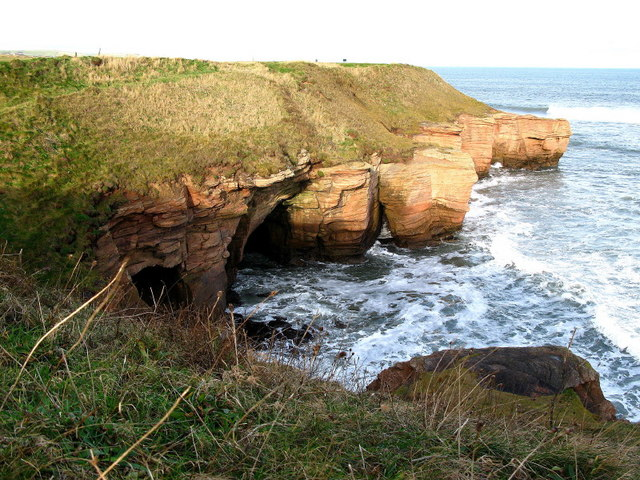
- Cliffs seen from the path to the north of Berwick upon Tweed.
- Length: 48 km (30 mi)
- Location: Berwickshire, Scotland and Northumberland, England
- Designation: Scotland's Great Trails
- Trailheads: Berwick upon Tweed55.771°N 2.007°W; Cockburnspath55.933°N 2.360°W
- Use: Hiking
- Elevation gain/loss: 1,060 metres (3,480 ft) gain
- Lowest point: Sea level
- Hazards: High cliffs
- Website: https://www.scotborders.gov.uk/berwickshirecoastalpath

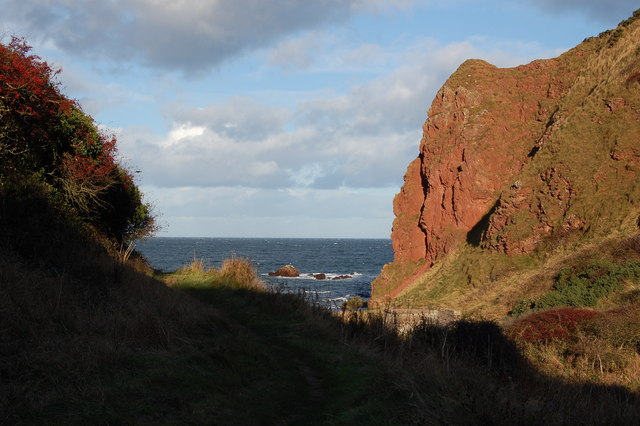
Abbey Burn and Linkim Shore

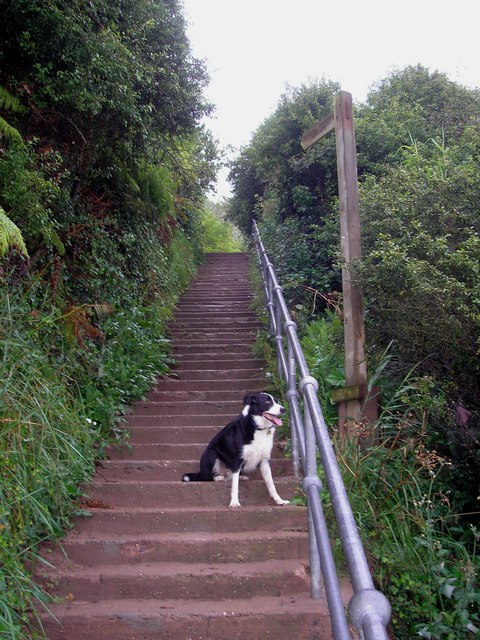
Steps leading down to Coldingham Bay

The Berwickshire Coastal Path is a walking route some 48 kilometres (30 mi) long. It follows the eastern coastline of Scotland from Cockburnspath in the Scottish Borders to Berwick upon Tweed, just over the border in England. At Cockburnspath the path links with the Southern Upland Way and the John Muir Way.

The coastline traversed by the path is nationally and internationally important for seabirds, coastal flora and marine life: much of the coastline is protected as a Special Protection Area, and there is a national nature reserve at St Abbs Head which is owned by the National Trust for Scotland. Strong walkers can walk the route in two days, although the walk can be split into shorter sections to allow more time to explore the towns and villages along the way.

The path was developed by Scottish Borders Council, and is now designated as one of Scotland's Great Trails by NatureScot. The route is waymarked, and there are four memorial statues at Eyemouth, Burnmouth, St Abbs and Cove to commemorate the 189 lives lost in the Eyemouth disaster of 14 October 1881, when a hurricane devastated the fishing fleet. Twelve bronze trail markers have also been erected along the route, linking the memorial sculptures.

It connects with the Northumberland Coast Path and hence the England Coast Path at Berwick on Tweed.

== The route ==
As walked in three stages.

=== Stage 1 ===
Starting in Cockburnspath, the first section of the Berwickshire Coastal Path is a gentle introduction with easy walking above Cove harbour and through farmland with some sections on minor roads to finish at Dowlaw. 12 km (7.5 miles)

=== Stage 2 ===
A gentle start through farmland soon leads on to the most dramatic section of the Berwickshire Coastal Path, leading along the rim of cliffs high above the sea. There is a fair amount of up and downhill as the route continues to the national nature reserve at St Abb's Head, famed for its seabirds, and on to the fishing village itself. The path then goes along the clifftops and beaches to reach the fishing port of Eyemouth. 17 km (10.5 miles)

=== Stage 3 ===
The final stage runs from Eyemouth to Berwick-upon-Tweed. Once a haven for smugglers, Eyemouth is now mainly a fishing port and a base for tourists. The port is a home to a fleet of about 20 fishing boats and in the summer this number can double. The route runs along the cliff tops, crossing the Border at Marshall Meadows Bay and on to Berwick-upon-Tweed in England. 19 km (11.75 miles)

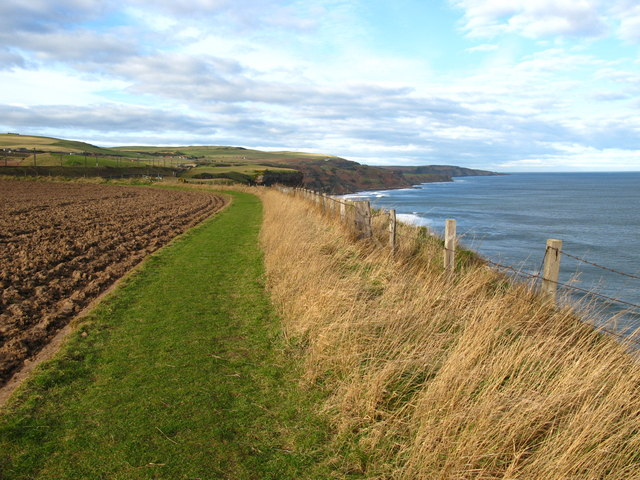
The path at Marshall Meadows is just 800 metres from the border between England and Scotland.

== Nearby attractions ==
Pease Bay, Fast Castle, St Abbs Head, Coldingham, Eyemouth, Burnmouth, Gunsgreen House, Berwick Upon Tweed.
