= Lost Shore Surf Resort =

Artificial wave pool in Ratho, Edinburgh, Scotland

Lost Shore
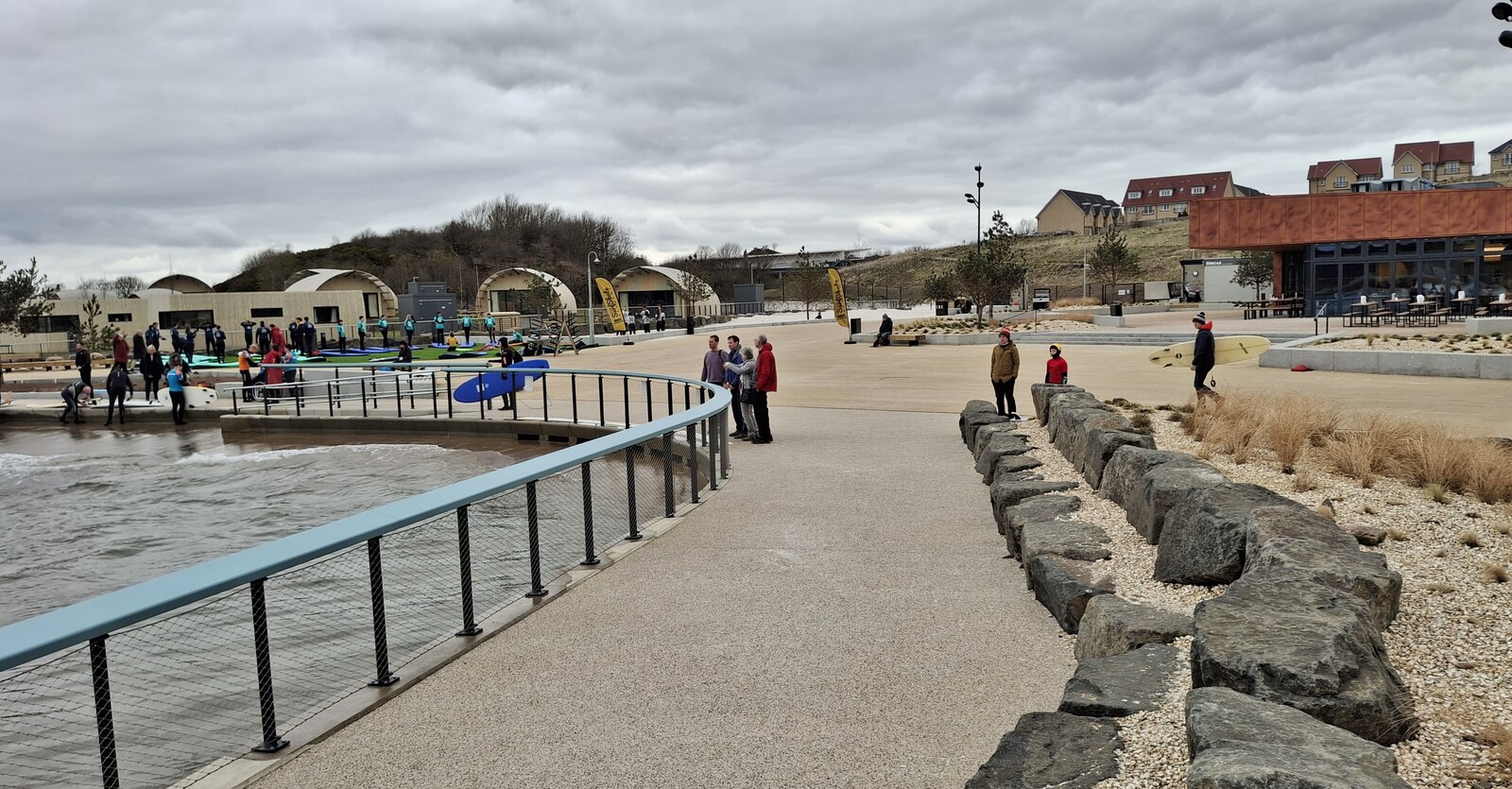
- Interactive map of Lost Shore
- Location: Ratho, Edinburgh Scotland
- Coordinates: 55°55′05″N 3°23′53″W
- Theme: Surf resort
- Owner: BAE Systems Pension Fund IM
- Opened: 11 November 2024
- Previous names: Wavegarden Scotland
- Operating season: All-season
- Website: www.lostshore.com

Lost Shore (formerly Wavegarden Scotland) is an inland surfing resort and local tourist attraction located in Ratho, Scotland, west of Edinburgh city centre and south of Edinburgh airport and Edinburgh International Climbing arena. The resort incorporates a stand-alone artificial wave pool and amenities. It is Scotland’s first commercial artificial surfing lake situated in a former quarry.

== Description ==
This is Europe’s largest artificial wave pool, powered by Wavegarden technology, and can generate up to 1,000 customisable waves per hour using sustainable methods of energy generation. It has a 250-metre beachfront and over 20 wave types, designed for surfers of different abilities. Amenities comprise accommodation in sleeping cabins and camping pods of different sizes, a waterfront bar, café, restaurant, surf school, surf shop, a training academy, sauna, and wellness treatments.

Alongside general facilities there’s also a research lab, established in collaboration with Edinburgh Napier University to test surfing wetsuits and surf gear.

In the first year of its operation the facility has attracted 100,000 visitors.

== History ==
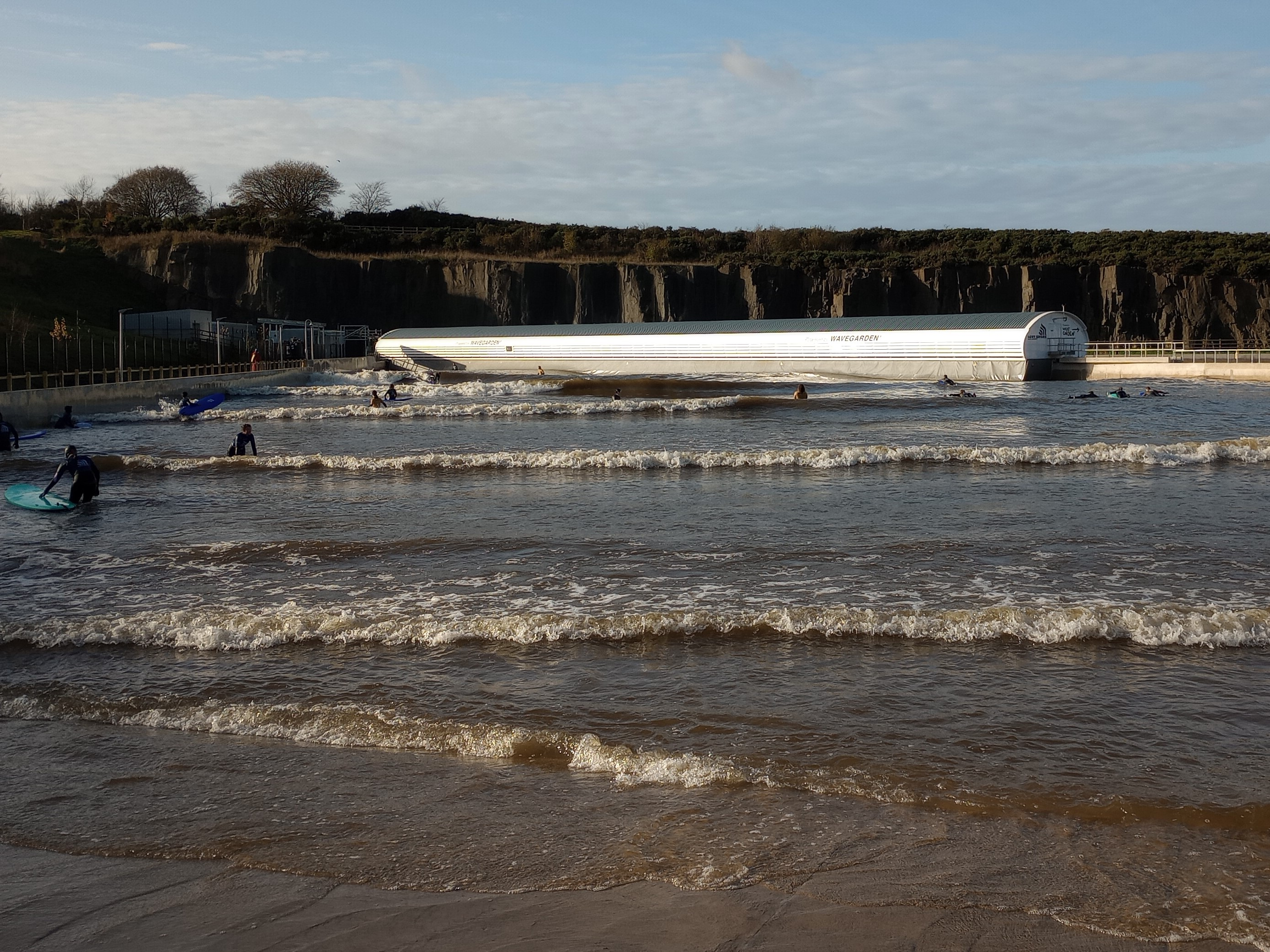
Wave pool, Lost Shore resort, 2025

The initial idea and project of the surf resort were developed by Andy Hadden — a Scottish businessman, chartered surveyor and surfer who set up Tartan Leisure Ltd. to back up the project, worth circa £60m.

The construction begun in 2022 in the disused Craigpark Quarry near Ratho and the site was first opened to public on 11 November 2024.

On 11 May 2025 RNLI Scotland has hosted a May Day a fundraising family-friendly event at the resort.

Lost Shore has claimed to sponsor world’s first PhD study in surf therapy, completed at Edinburgh Napier University by Jamie Marshall in 2022. Subsequently, The Surf Lab was set up on-site in partnership with the university for research in the areas of surf therapy, high performance surfing, adaptive surfing, and equipment R&D.

== See also ==
- Surfing in Scotland
- Para surfing
- Surf therapy
- Wave pool
