= Surfing in Scotland =

Scottish Surfing Surfadh na h-Alaba
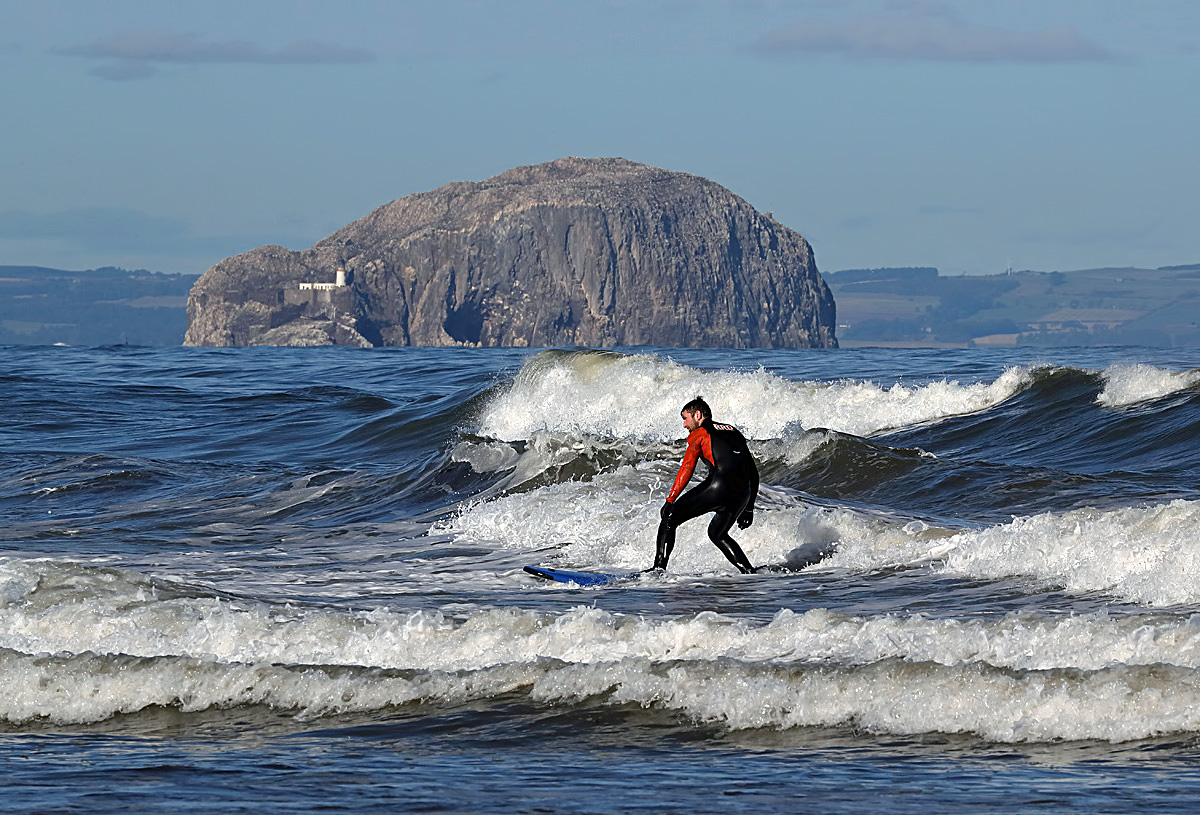
- Surfing at Belhaven bay
- Country: Scotland
- Governing body: Scottish Surfing Federation
- National team: Surf Scotland
- First played: 1973

National competitions
- Scottish National Surfing Championships

International competitions
- Summer Olympics

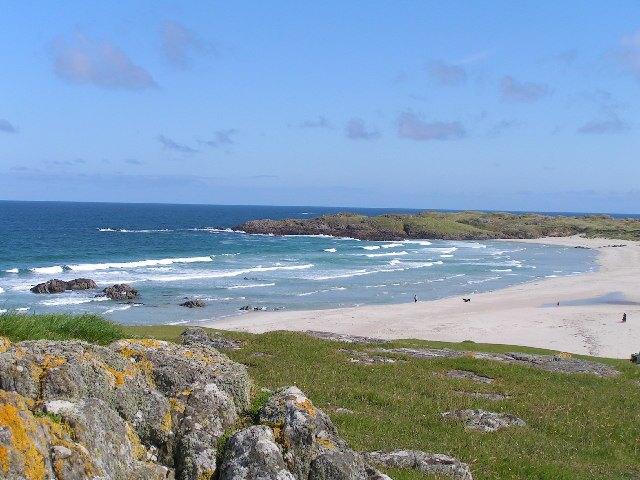
Tràigh Baile a' Mhuilinn on the north west coast of Tiree, Inner Hebrides

Surfing in Scotland is a minor sport. It is practiced on east and west coast where the water is warmed by the Gulf Stream. It is represented by the long boarding, short boarding, stand-up paddleboarding and para surfing.

Scotland is a popular surfing destination, with numerous spots known for consistent waves and stunning scenery, especially during the colder months. While the water can be cold, the surfing community is vibrant, offering lessons, surf camps, and various surfing spots for all skill levels.

== History ==
First surfing clubs date back in 1970s. The Scottish Surfing Federation was established in 1975. By the end of 1990s the sport has suffered a significant decline. The revival of popular sport in 2005 meant the establishing of regular National Championships in spring and Clan gatherings in autumn.

== Surfing locations ==
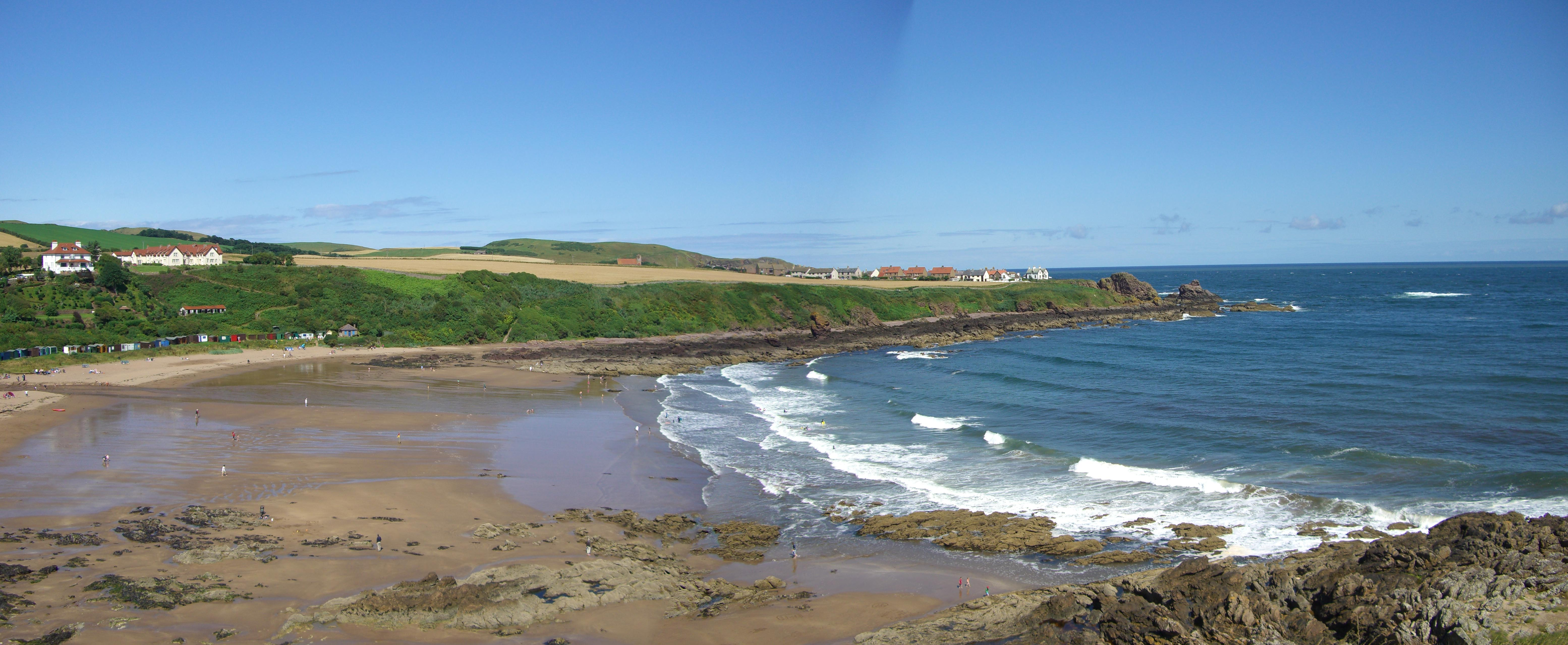
A panorama shot of Coldingham Sands from Homeli Knoll, the village of St Abbs is just visible over the headland.

Surfing locations in Scotland include the following:

North East Coast

- Cullen, Moray
- Fraserburgh
- Lossiemouth
- Banff, Aberdeenshire
- Aberdeen
- Sandend

East Coast

- Coldingham Bay
- Eyemouth
- Pease Bay
- St. Abbs
- Belhaven Bay

West Coast

- Machrihanish, Kintyre

North Coast

- Thurso East

Islands

- Ness, Lewis
- Tiree

Inland

- Lost Shore surf resort

== Surf schools ==
Surfing schools in Scotland include the following:

- Blue Coast Surf & Paddle, Cullen
- New Wave Surf School, Lossiemouth
- North Coast Watersports, Thurso
- Coast to Coast Surf School, Dunbar
- Surf Lewis, Isle of Lewis
- Blown Away, St Andrews
- Scot Surf School, Aberdeen
- Blackhouse Watersports, Isle of Tiree
- Momentum Surf School, Edinburgh
- Pete's Surf School, Campbeltown

== See also ==
- Lost Shore Surf Resort
- Para surfing
- Surf therapy
