= Hoselaw Loch and Din Moss =

Nature reserve in the Scottish Borders area of Scotland

Coordinates: 55.5783°N 2.3081°W

Designations

Ramsar Wetland
- Official name: Din Moss - Hoselaw Loch
- Designated: 14 July 1988
- Reference no.: 405

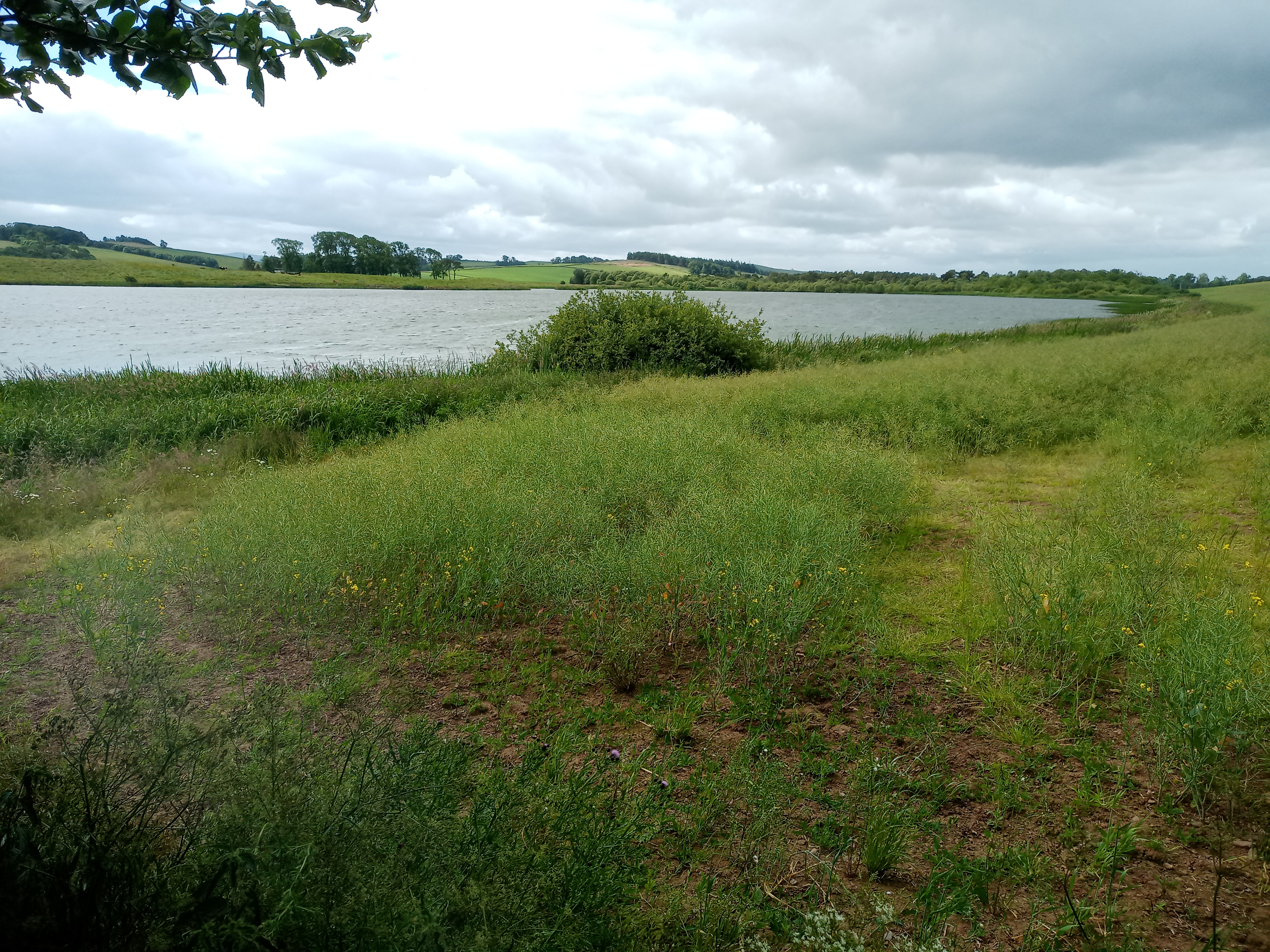
Hoselaw Loch and Din Moss is at the other end

Hoselaw Loch and Din Moss is a nature reserve near Kelso in the Scottish Borders area of Scotland, in the former Roxburghshire. A lack of footpaths and the surrounding land being used by farms makes access tricky. Din Moss is one of the largest intact areas of raised bog in the Scottish Borders

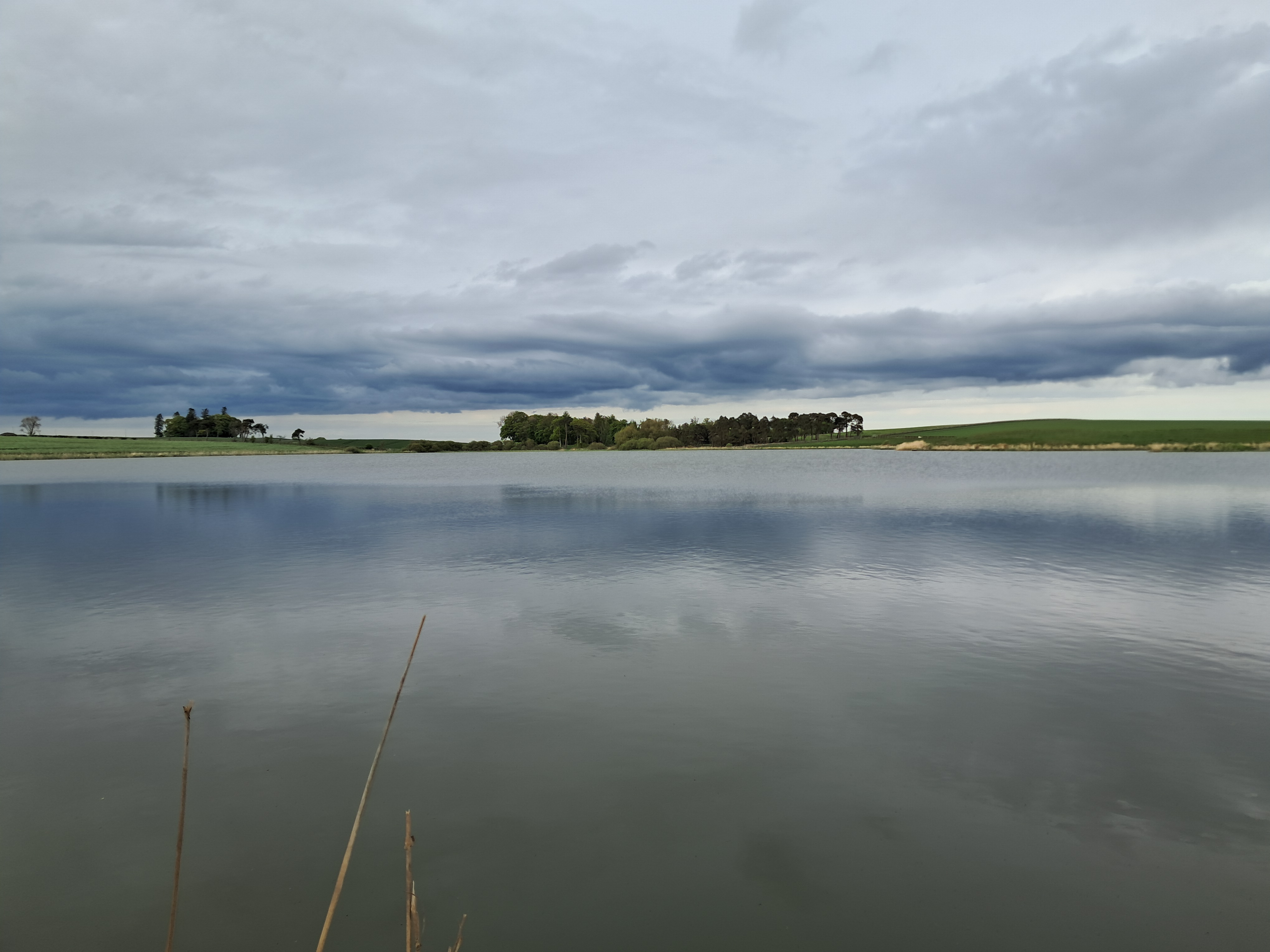
View of Hoselaw loch looking north east from Din Moss

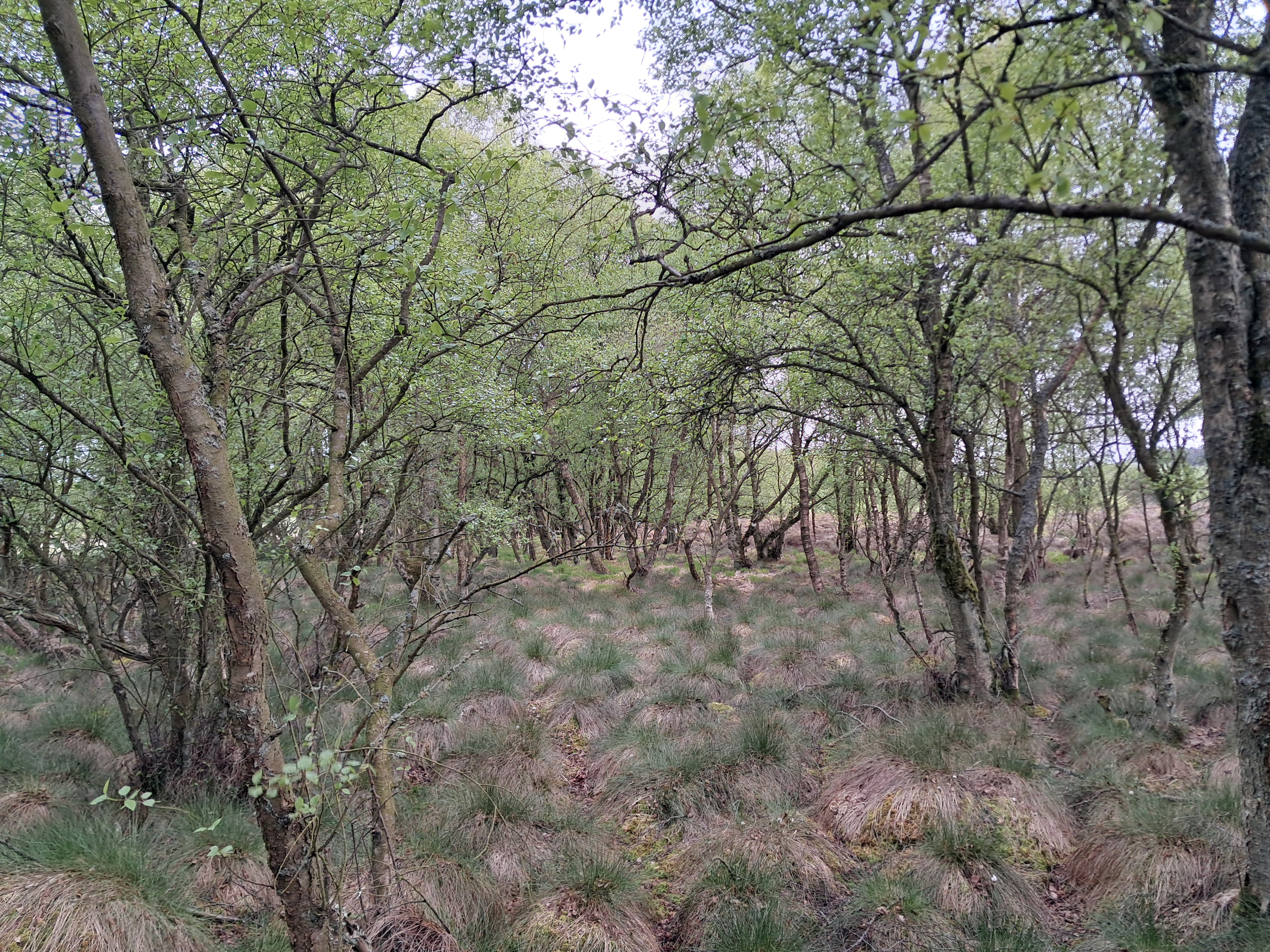
Birch trees at Din Moss

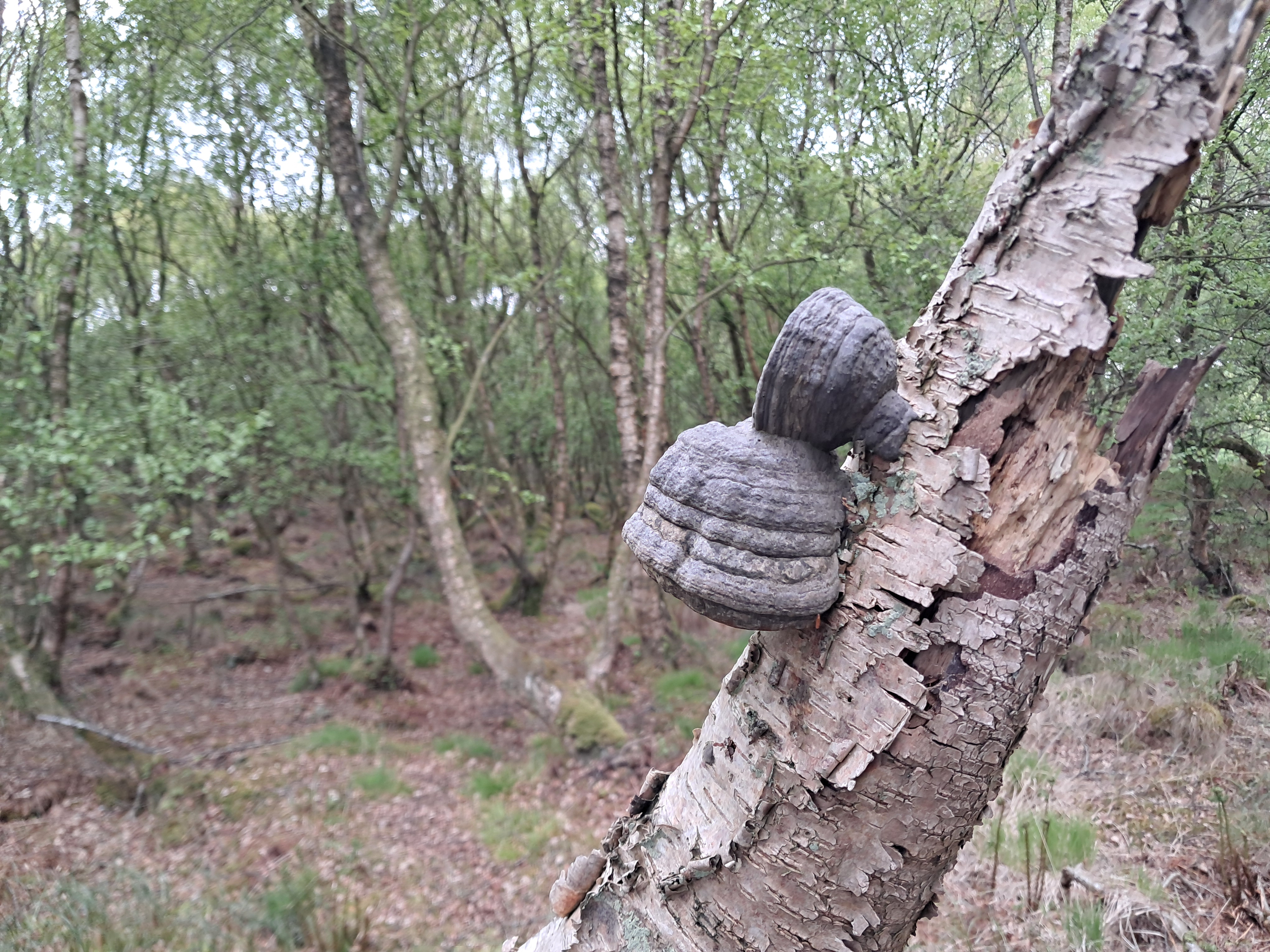
Hoof Fungus (fomes fomentarius) at Din Moss

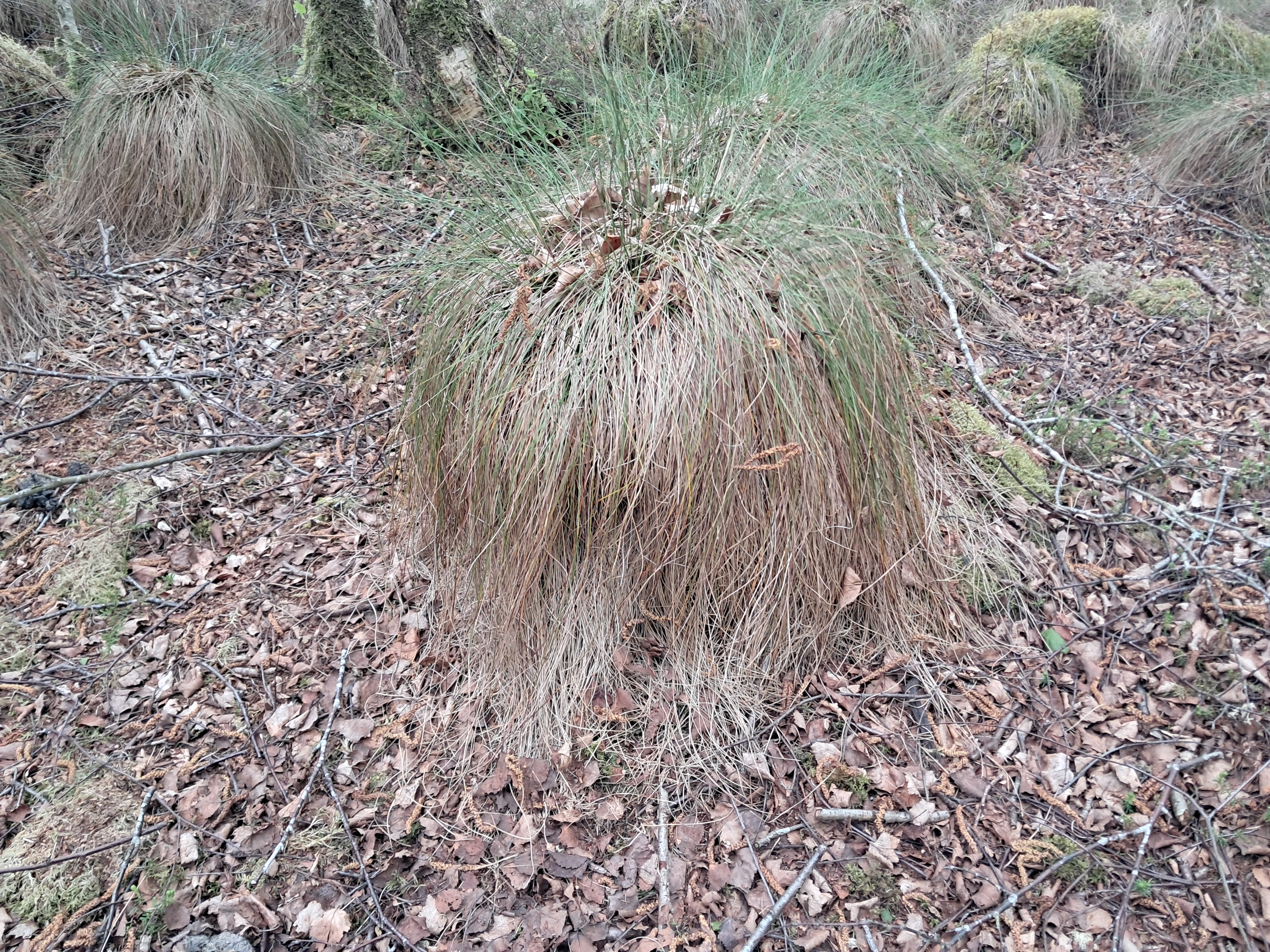
Great Tussock Sedge at Din Moss

The reserve is designated SSSI, SPA and Ramsar because of the large numbers of wildfown overwintering there, especially the Icelandic/Greenland pink-footed goose (Anser brachyrhynchus) and the Icelandic greylag goose (Anser anser).

== See also ==
- List of Sites of Special Scientific Interest in Berwickshire and Roxburgh
- List of Sites of Special Scientific Interest in Tweeddale and Ettrick and Lauderdale
- Special Protection Area, SPA
- Joint Nature Conservation Committee
- List of places in the Scottish Borders
- List of places in Scotland
