= Bemersyde Moss =

Nature reserve in Scotland

Coordinates: 55.5979°N 2.6156°W

Bemersyde Moss is a Scottish Wildlife Trust nature reserve and a Site of Special Scientific Interest at Bemersyde in the Scottish Borders area of Scotland. Located near the River Tweed, this reserve features a mix of marshlands, willow scrub, and open water, creating a vital habitat for diverse wildlife. It particularly hostsbirds in the warmer months and wintering wildfowl, such as teal, shoveler, goldeneye, and wigeon, during colder months. The site also supports mammals like otters, which can be observed throughout the year.

== See also ==
- Site of Special Scientific Interest
- List of Sites of Special Scientific Interest in Berwickshire and Roxburgh
- List of Sites of Special Scientific Interest in Tweeddale and Ettrick and Lauderdale
- List of places in the Scottish Borders
- List of places in Scotland
