= Pease Bay =

Bay in the Scottish Borders area of Scotland

Coordinates: 55°56′N 2°20′W

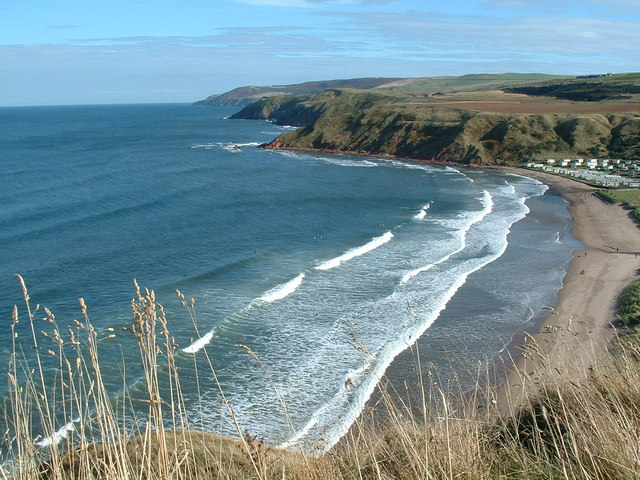
Pease Bay

Pease Bay is a bay situated around 9 miles southeast of Dunbar, in the Scottish Borders area of Scotland, close to the border with East Lothian as well as Cockburnspath, Cove and Dunglass. The area is notable as a holiday destination, for surfing in Scotland, and also for the large static caravan park at the bottom of the bay.

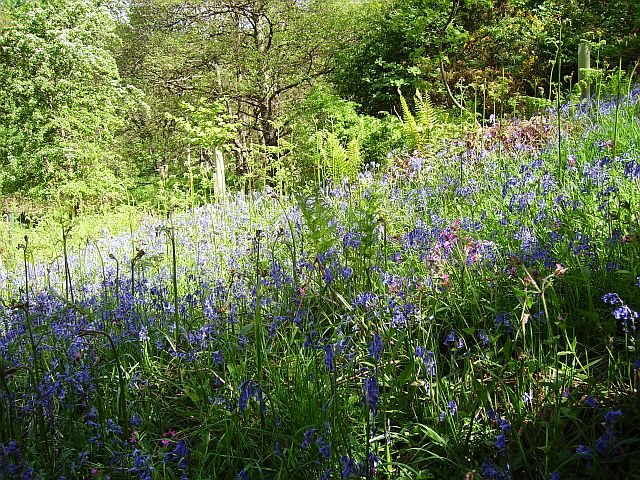
Pease Dean

== Pease Dean ==
Pease Dean is a Scottish Wildlife Trust reserve. It consists of Pease Burn and Tower Burn.

== Pease Bridge ==
Pease Bridge was opened in 1786. At that time it was the highest bridge in the world. Comprising four tall arches, it is 300 ft (91.5m) long, 16 ft(4.9m) wide, and 139 ft(39.6m) high. The parapet is surmounted by an iron railing.

- SCRAN image:Pease Bridge
- RCAHMS: Pease Bridge, Pease Burn, Pease Dean
- A1107: Reopening of Pease Bridge, 2004.

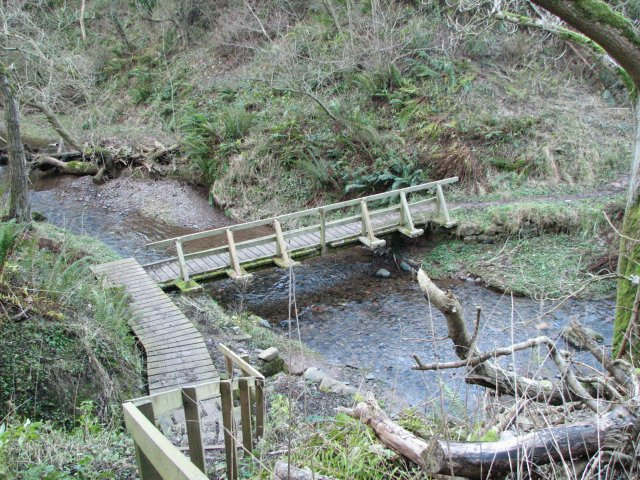
Pease Dean footbridge

== See also ==
- Site of Special Scientific Interest SSSI
- Sir Walter Scott Way
- List of places in the Scottish Borders
- List of places in Scotland
