= Dunglass =

Coordinates: 55.942°N 2.376°W

Dunglass: Scottish Gaelic: An Dùn Glas
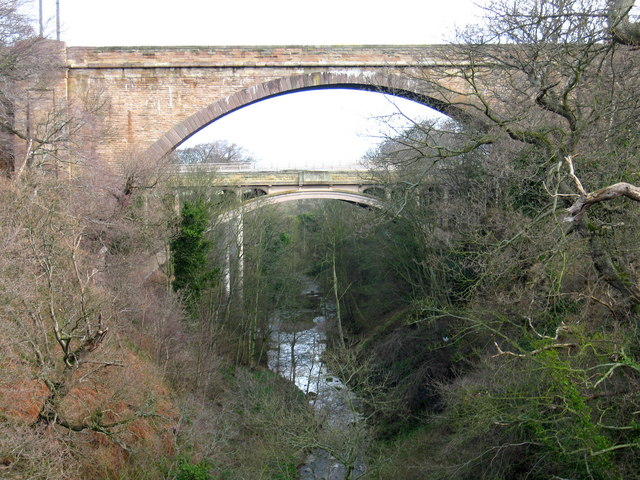
- Dunglass Bridge and Viaduct above Dunglass Burn

- Location within Scotland
- OS grid reference: NT765721
- Civil parish: Oldhamstocks
- Council area: East Lothian Council
- Lieutenancy area: East Lothian
- Country: Scotland
- Sovereign state: United Kingdom
- Post town: COCKBURNSPATH
- Postcode district: TD13
- Dialling code: 01368
- Police: Scotland
- Fire: Scottish
- Ambulance: Scottish
- UK Parliament: East Lothian
- Scottish Parliament: East Lothian

Dunglass is a hamlet in East Lothian, Scotland, lying east of the Lammermuir Hills on the North Sea coast, within the parish of Oldhamstocks. It has a 15th-century collegiate church, now in the care of Historic Scotland. Dunglass is the birthplace of Sir James Hall, an 18th-century Scottish geologist and geophysicist. The name Dunglass comes from the Brittonic for "grey-green hill".

== Geography ==
Dunglass is a small settlement about 1 km (0.5 mi) north-west of Cockburnspath and 11 km (7 mi) south-east of Dunbar. The whole of Dunglass lies in an area of 2.47 km^{2}. It lies to the east of the Lammermuir Hills on the North Sea coast at the point where the old Great North Road and modern A1 as well as the London-Edinburgh railway cross the gorge of the Dunglass Burn. The burn forms the boundary between the shires of East Lothian and Berwick. Other settlements nearby include Cove, Pease Bay, and Pease Dean.

== Dunglass Castle and estate ==
Dunglass Castle was built by the Pepdies of Dunglass in the 14th century. On the marriage of Nicola Pepdie to Sir Thomas Home of Home, the castle and lands passed to the Home family. James IV of Scotland stayed in December 1496, and played cards. He gave a tip to masons working on the building and enjoyed a banquet including spices bought from Edinburgh.

The Home family were forfeited in 1516, and the castle passed to Archibald Douglas, Earl of Angus. It was besieged and slighted by the English under the command of Earl Henry of Northumberland in the winter of 1532.

=== Rough Wooing ===
In 1547, during the war now known as the Rough Wooing, Dunglass was captured by the forces of the Duke of Somerset from George Douglas of Pittendreich, and was fortified and garrisoned by the English. A new artillery fortification was built overlooking the old castle of the Home family. In January 1549 the French landed two boat loads of ladders at Dunbar, intending to assault the fort.

The English soldiers were entertained by two Irish minstrels on 9 July 1549. On 31 January 1550 English soldiers raided Keith Marischal, burning two barn yards at the Place of Nether Keith and houses in the village. They were chased back to Dunglas. Regent Arran gave orders for cannon to be shipped to re-take the fort on 11 April 1550. The Earl of Rutland was at Dunglass in May 1550 and took the opportunity to have his mail armour scoured in a bag of bran and had his pistol mended. He bought white fabric in the camp at Dunglass to modify his hose for the hot weather in July.

The fort at Dunglass was surrendered to the French in March 1550. In June, the remaining cannon were taken to Dunbar Castle and the villagers in the area were summoned to slight the fort.

=== Earls of Home and the Hall family ===
In October 1595 Christian Douglas, Lady Home moved her best household goods from Dunglass to Fife, sparking rumours of a marital separation. James VI of Scotland stayed with her husband Lord Home at Dunglass Castle on 13 March 1596, for his "sports". He alarmed the English garrison by coming to hunt near Berwick-upon-Tweed, staying a night the house of the laird of 'Beelleys' (Billie Castle), six miles from Berwick, and then returning to Dunglass.

The castle was rebuilt, in an enlarged and improved form, and gave accommodation on 5 April 1603 to King James VI, and all his retinue, when on his journey to London to take up the English throne. It was improved by Mary, Countess of Home and her husband, Alexander Home, 1st Earl of Home, who escorted King James from Berwick to Dunglass, and then to Pencraig by East Linton Bridge in 1617.

The castle was destroyed again on 30 August 1640 when held by a party of Covenanters under Thomas, Earl of Haddington. An English page, according to Scotstarvet, vexed by a taunt against his countrymen, thrust a red-hot iron into a powder barrel, and himself was killed, with the Earl, his half-brother, Richard, and many others. A pamphlet with a verse account of the explosion and a list of casualties was published by the author and poet William Lithgow. He named thirty nine dead including five women, and John White, an English plasterer working for Lady Home.

The Hall family occupied Dunglass for 232 years from 1687. Francis James Usher bought the Estate from Sir John Richard Hall, 9th Bart in 1919, and the estate remains in the Usher family. The Earl of Home continues to hold the title "Lord of Dunglass", despite the fact his family have not held Dunglass for several centuries.

== Sir James Hall ==
In the Spring of 1788, the geologist Sir James Hall together with John Playfair and James Hutton set off from Dunglass Burn in a boat heading east along the coast looking for evidence to support Hutton's theory that rock formations were laid down in an unending cycle over immense periods of time. They found examples of Hutton's Unconformity at several places, particularly an outcrop at Siccar Point sketched by Sir James Hall. As Playfair later recalled, "The mind seemed to grow giddy by looking so far back into the abyss of time".

== See also ==
- List of places in East Lothian
- List of places in the Scottish Borders
