= Gordon Moss =

Nature reserve in the Scottish Borders area of Scotland

Coordinates: 55.6746°N 2.5823°W

Gordon Moss is a nature reserve near Gordon, in the Scottish Borders area of Scotland, in the former Berwickshire.

The moss is situated one mile west of Gordon village, south of the Gordon – Earlston road (A6105). Parking places.

The fauna includes 16 species of butterfly and over 200 species of moth.

== History and archaeology ==
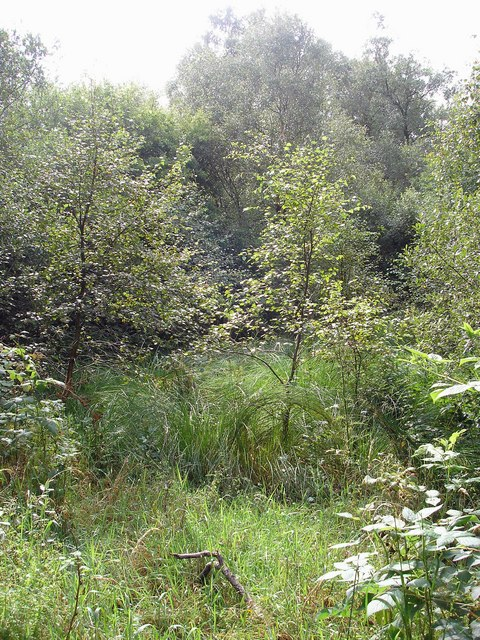
clearing in the reserve

On 21 January 1882, a workman walking across Gordon Moss discovered a flint axehead, described as being fashioned of a dark grey mottled flint, measuring 150mm by 50mm.

Gordon Moss is a remaining fragment of a much larger area of moss-land which historically extended across much of the low-lying ground from Earlston, past Gordon and Eastwards towards Greenlaw. Agricultural drainage schemes were implemented and allowed much of this land to be farmed. It appears that historically the drainage of the current Gordon Moss area was largely unsuccessful and in wet weather conditions much of the larger low-lying area becomes boggy and flooded to this day.

Gordon Moss formed part of the lands of the Greenknowe Estate. Circa the 1700s, some nearby land from the estate was sold as plots which now form Gordon's Main Street. Many of the title deeds of these plots came with a variety of rights from the lands of Greenknowe such as catching rabbits, gathering firewood and cutting divots (turf to fireproof thatching). This caused various conflicts with farming practices on the Greenknowe estate so in the 1800s part of the land of the Gordon Moss was given in exchange for these rights. The new owners of this land were known as the feuars and it is understood locally that certain properties still retain rights to part of the Gordon Moss. It appears that the feuars continued to attempt draining the land for some time afterwards and used it for grazing, firewood and shooting.

Local folklore says that in the mists of time the nearby village of Gordon was attacked by enemy soldiers. Local lads acted foolishly to entice the invaders to follow them into the Gordon Moss. By leaping out from behind bushes they lured the enemy into rushing forwards at them into very dangerous boggy areas and saved their village. They were proudly known as the Gordon Gowks and are remembered yet.

== Twenty-first century ==
The Gordon Moss is a Site of Special Scientific Interest (SSSI) – these are controlled and monitored by NatureScot. There are very few remaining areas of semi-natural moss land remaining in the Scottish Borders.

Whilst there is little maintenance or human interference in the Gordon Moss, the Scottish Wildlife Trust have an involvement with part of the Moss.

The water levels in the moss are lower than they were historically. It is a quiet place to explore with strong footwear, but adders are present. There are various safe tracks throughout, but some deep boggy areas and pools remain.

== See also ==
- List of Sites of Special Scientific Interest in Berwickshire and Roxburgh
- List of Sites of Special Scientific Interest in Tweeddale and Ettrick and Lauderdale
- List of places in the Scottish Borders
- List of places in Scotland
