= Yetholm Loch =

Freshwater loch in the Scottish Borders

Coordinates: 55°33′N 2°19′W

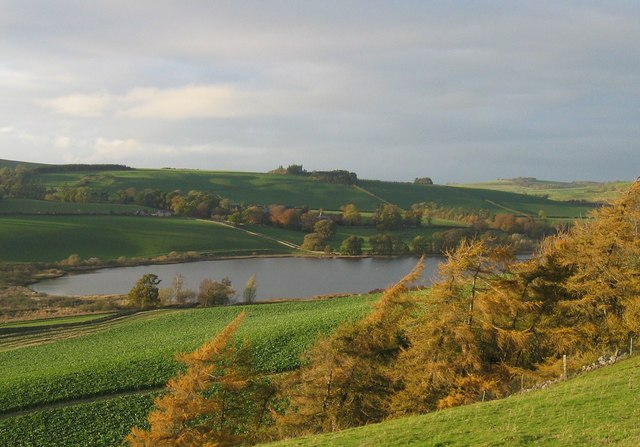
Yetholm Loch. Looking towards Lochside from Yetholm Law

Yetholm Loch is a loch near Kelso, in the Scottish Borders area of Scotland, in the former Roxburghshire.

There was a tower on an island in Yetholm Loch which could be reached via a causeway. The tower was destroyed by the Earl of Surrey on the night of 17 May 1523.

The loch lies in a crescent-shaped valley, at the edge of the Cheviot Hills. The southern end of the loch is swamp, but it gradually gives way to fen and willow scrub.

Yetholm Loch has been designated a Site of Special Scientific Interest (SSSI) by NatureScot.

== See also ==
- List of Sites of Special Scientific Interest in Berwickshire and Roxburgh
- List of places in the Scottish Borders
