= Jesse Billauer =

American surfer

Jesse Billauer (born February 24, 1979) is a well-known surfer from Pacific Palisades, Los Angeles.

Billauer suffered an accident at the age of 17 on March 25, 1996, hitting his head on a shallow sandbar after being knocked off his surfboard by a wave. The force broke his neck, severing his spinal cord at the C6 level and instantly rendering him a quadriplegic.

Billauer was told by doctors that he would never surf again. However, Billauer eventually did return to surfing, adapting his surfing technique and equipment to the situation of his current condition, known as para surfing. He has become a role model to many other surfers, both professional and amateur, on how to live a life to the fullest, despite a life changing injury. Through these efforts, Jesse has gained sponsorships from companies including Hurley, Channel Islands Surfboards (who developed a "Jesse Billauer" model), LoFric, Wavejet and Shoe City.

After graduating from Malibu High School, Billauer eventually enrolled at San Diego State University with an emphasis in communications. He graduated in 2002. He is also a motivational speaker, and is executive director the nonprofit he founded, Life Rolls On. Through this foundation, Billauer is promoting awareness for spinal cord injury quality of life programs.

The 2003 documentary Step Into Liquid featured his story and his friendship with Rob Machado. Billauer was also featured on Extreme Makeover: Home Edition, Dateline NBC, Good Morning America, While You Were Out, E! True American Story, and more. In 2004, he won the 10News Leadership Award for his commitment to the Life Rolls On Foundation. His life story is featured in the book Bouncing Forward: Transforming Bad Breaks into Breakthroughs.

In 2005, Billauer became the first quadriplegic surfer to surf the dangerous waves of Cloudbreak in Fiji. He now surfs utilizing a power-assisted surfboard created by Wavejet.

The inaugural "Jesse's Story on Tour" speaking tour began in April 2006. The tour reached over 100,000 people.

In December 2006, Billauer broke his femur while surfing large waves on the North Shore of Oahu. This injury led to the development of improved equipment for disabled surfers. He has since recovered and returned to surfing again.

In September 2013, he took over as executive director and CEO of the Life Rolls On Foundation.

On October 26, 2014, Billauer married his longtime girlfriend, Samanta Pearson, at the historic Adamson House in Malibu.
