= Disability Discrimination Act 1992 =

Act of the Parliament of Australia

Parliament of Australia
- Long title: An Act relating to discrimination on the ground of disability
- Citation: No. 135 of 1992 or No. 135, 1992 as amended
- Territorial extent: States and territories of Australia
- Enacted by: House of Representatives
- Enacted by: Senate

Legislative history

First chamber: House of Representatives
- Bill title: Disability Discrimination Bill 1992
- Introduced by: Brian Howe
- First reading: 26 May 1992
- Second reading: 19 Aug 1992
- Third reading: 19 Aug 1992
- Status: In force

The Disability Discrimination Act 1992 (Cth) is an Act passed by the Parliament of Australia in which prohibits discrimination against people with disabilities in employment, education, publicly available premises, provision of goods and services, accommodation, clubs and associations, and other contexts. Discrimination is defined to include failing to make reasonable adjustments for the person. The Australian Human Rights Commission are given and assess complaints made under the Act.

== Background ==
At the time of the Act's enactment, a variety of anti-discrimination acts for people with disabilities already existed in the different state legislatures, some dating back to the early 1980s. All states and territories except Tasmania and the Northern Territory had anti-discrimination laws in place, and these two places had legislation under consideration. There were three reasons given for enacting a federal law:

- Standardise the scope of rights offered around the country
- Implement the Australian Government's obligations as a signatory to international declarations on the rights of people with disabilities.
- Enable regulation of discriminatory practices of Commonwealth authorities.

== Legacy ==
In 2004, the findings of the Productivity Commission's enquiry into the Act were published. The Commission found that while there was still room for improvement, particularly in reducing discrimination in employment, overall the Act had been reasonably effective.

In addition, the Commission found that people with a disability were still less likely than other people to finish school, have a TAFE or university qualification, and be employed. They are more likely to have a below average income, be on a pension, live in public housing and in prison. The average personal income for people with a disability is 44 per cent of the income of other Australians.

=== Maguire v Sydney Olympic Committee ===
This case, brought by Bruce Maguire, concerned the website of the Sydney 2000 Olympics, and the inability of those with vision impairments to efficiently use the website.

In its decision, the Commission found that the Sydney Organising Committee for the Olympic Games (SOCOG) had discriminated against the complainant in contravention of s 24 of the Act, "in that the web site does not include ALT text on all images and image maps links, the Index to Sports cannot be accessed from the Schedule page and the Results Tables provided during the Games on the web site will remain inaccessible."

The commission also dismissed SOCOG's claim that modifying its website to meet the requirements would cause it unjustifiable hardship and established that such hardship cannot be used to avoid liability for breaching s 24 of the Act. SOCOG was ordered to render the website accessible by 15 September 2000.

== See also ==
- Adaptive Physical Education Australia
- Disability discrimination act
- Disability Discrimination Act 1995 (United Kingdom)
- Maguire v SOCOG 1999
