= AccesSurf =

US nonprofit organization

- Formation: 2006
- Founder: Mark Marble
- Type: 501(c)(3) nonprofit group
- Purpose: AccesSurf empowers people with disabilities by providing adaptive surfing instruction and therapeutic educational programs on water recreation and enriches lives by assisting families to access the beach and ocean in a barrier free environment.
- Headquarters: Honolulu, Hawaii
- Website: www.accessurf.org

AccesSurf is a nonprofit charity organization that offers a variety of programs, services, and events for people with a disability. Based in Honolulu, Hawaii, AccesSurf was founded in 2006. Their mission is to "empower people with disabilities by providing adaptive surfing and therapeutic educational programs on water recreation and enriches lives by helping families to access the beach and ocean in a barrier free environment." AccesSurf educates the general public about how to help people with disabilities and provide the resources necessary to create the opportunities. They have created programs locally and nationally to assist anyone with a physical disability or cognitive disability in the water environment. For the fiscal year of 2013, AccesSurf netted $104,960 with their asset amount of $112,408.

== History ==
AccesSurf was founded in 2006 in Honolulu, Hawaii, by Mark Marbles. With the help of friends and family, Marbles wanted to create an area where people with disabilities could come out and enjoy the beach. AccesSurf started with their program "Day at the Beach" and eventually expanded by creating a "Wounded Warrior Day at the Beach". With the growth of both of these events, AccesSurf became the first accredited Paralympic Sports Club in Hawaii in 2012.

In September 2019, AccesSurf merged with Hawaii Adaptive Paddling Association (HAPA), which expanded both nonprofit groups' volunteer-base and programming.

== Programs ==
AccesSurf offers a wide variety of programs such as the "Day at the Beach" and the "Wounded Warrior Day at the Beach" and is also part of the only Paralympic Sports Club in Hawaii.

=== Day at the Beach ===
The "Day at the Beach" program is a free monthly service provided by trained volunteers to introduce adaptive aquatic recreation using specialized surfboards, wave skis, and flotation devices for anyone with a physical disability or cognitive disability. Due to the struggle that persons with disabilities and their families experience when attempting to access the beach, AccesSurf repurposed military industrial mats (Mobi-Mats) to create a wheelchair- and stroller-accessible beach path. Along with equipment, AccesSurf provides specially-trained professionals. The intention of the program is to allow people to have a fun and relaxing day without having to worry about disabilities.

=== Wounded Warrior Day at the Beach ===
Similar to "Day at the Beach", the "Wounded Warrior Day at the Beach" is another service offered by AccesSurf. This service is for veterans who have been classified Wounded Warriors.

=== Paralympic Sports Club ===
In 2012, AccesSurf became the first accredited Paralympic Sports Club in Hawaii. With the help of swim coaches from Swim Mechanix, AccesSurf was able to develop swim clinics both in the pool and the ocean.

=== International Surfing Association Adaptive Surfing World Championship ===
AccesSurf and its volunteers have been invited to help and sponsor athletes in the first ever adaptive surfing world championship held in La Jolla, California, in September 2015.

== See also ==
- Warrior Games
- Special Olympics
