= Dunglass Collegiate Church =

Church building in East Lothian, Scotland

Coordinates: 55°56′22″N 2°22′31″W

Dunglass Collegiate Church is situated in south-east East Lothian just off the old A1 highway, one mile north of Cockburnspath in Berwickshire, Scotland, UK. It is designated as a scheduled monument.

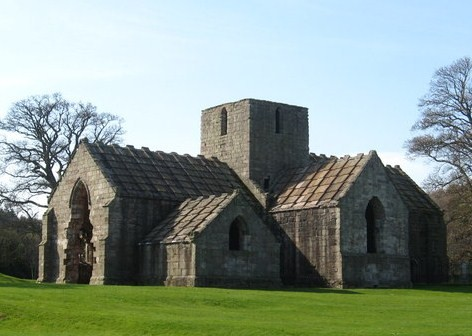
Collegiate Church at Dunglass

== History ==
The date of building the Chapel, dedicated to St. Mary of Dunglass, is unclear but when Sir Alexander Home of that Ilk was granted a charter, in 1421, to the lands of Dunglass the chapel was in existence, adjacent to Dunglass Castle, now demolished. In 1423, Sir Alexander Home of Dunglass employed priests (a college) to pray for the family's souls and the chapel was raised to collegiate status. This was confirmed by King James II of Scots in 1450 and confirmed by Pope Nicholas V. The college was composed of a provost, three chaplains and four boy choristers. In November 1500 George Home of Ayton endowed a chaplain to sing at the altar of "Our Lady of Pity" in the church. Originally, the church consisted of a nave and a choir and the Home or Hume burial vault. In the 16th century transepts were added and a new tower.

In 1544 the church and castle were attacked by the Earl of Hertford's army during the wars of the Rough Wooing but the locals managed to repel the insurgents. In 1556 Lady Agnes Stewart, Countess of Bothwell, and Lady of Home, who held a "liferent interest" of Dunglass, appointed Hugh Hudson to the prebend of Dunglass as a replacement for Thomas Hudson. The Provost of Dunglass at the time was Abraham Crichton and John Fraser was chaplain.

In 1560, the church closed at the onset of the Scottish Reformation. An Act of the Scottish Parliament in 1563 abolished mass forever and the church's days as a Roman Catholic Chapel were over. In the early days of the church, a hospital, to offer solace and aid to the sick, was built nearby and dedicated to St. Mary and John the Baptist. The building is built of ashlar sandstone and roofed by stone slabs though the tower is now unroofed.

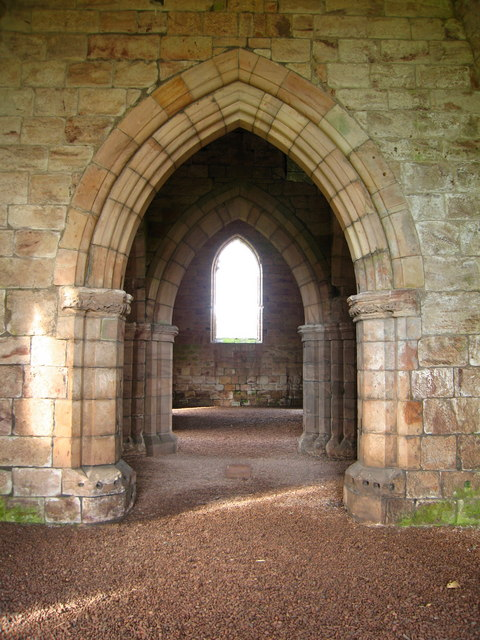
Dunglass interior looking west

== Later years ==
After the Reformation the church continued to be used as a parish church until the 18th century before it was sold to a farmer. The widow of Alexander Home, 1st Earl of Home (d. 1619), the Countess of Home discussed erecting a marble tomb for her husband with the London sculptor Nicholas Stone, but nothing was done. She died in London and her body was shipped to Dunglass for burial in 1644. The estate passed to Sir John Ruthven and the collegiate status of the church was suppressed by Act of Parliament.

The holy building was desecrated around the year 1710 when the owner allowed a farmer to bulldoze the east window to make way for his vehicles and the church including the burial aisle was used as a barn. In 1807 some dignity was restored when Sir John Hall bought Dunglass; the family later used the south transept as a burial aisle. In 1919 the estate was purchased by the Usher family.

== The present day ==
Dunglass Church is now in the care of Historic Environment Scotland and is situated in an idyllic situation surrounded by well manicured lawns and thick woodland. An interesting sundial stands on a mound adjacent to the ancient edifice. Dunglass Collegiate Church is one of the top attractions in East Lothian.

== See also ==
- List of places in East Lothian
- List of places in Scotland
