= Cockburnspath =

Village in the Scottish Borders

Coordinates: 55.93295°N 2.36018°W

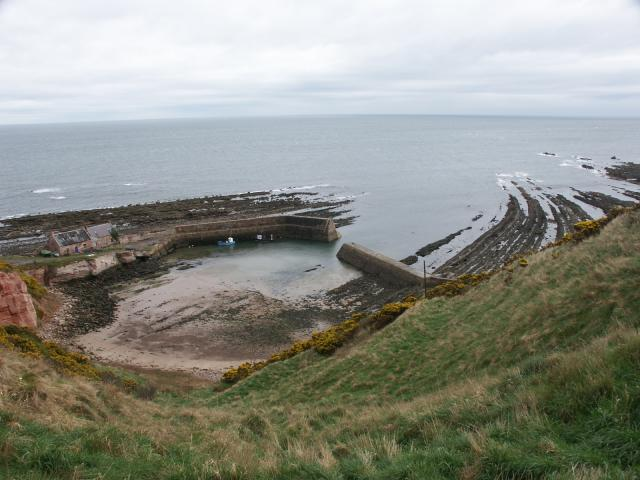
- Cove harbour

- Location within the Scottish Borders
- Population: 411 (2001 census)
- OS grid reference: NT774710
- Council area: Scottish Borders
- Lieutenancy area: Berwickshire
- Country: Scotland
- Sovereign state: United Kingdom
- Post town: COCKBURNSPATH
- Postcode district: TD13
- Dialling code: 01368
- Police: Scotland
- Fire: Scottish
- Ambulance: Scottish
- UK Parliament: Berwickshire, Roxburgh and Selkirk
- Scottish Parliament: Ettrick, Roxburgh and Berwickshire

Cockburnspath (/ˈkoʊbərnzˌpɑːθ/ KOH-bərnz-path) is a village in Berwickshire in the Scottish Borders. It lies near the North Sea coast between Berwick-upon-Tweed and Dunbar. Cockburnspath is the eastern terminus of the Southern Upland Way as well as the northern terminus of the Berwickshire Coastal Path. At the nearby village of Cove, there is a small fishing harbour.

== History ==
The area has many archeological remains which indicate it has been lived in and fought over since the Bronze Age. It lies close to the old invasion route from England into Scotland. Cockburnspath was originally known as "Colbrand's Path", after a folkloric giant.

Sir Adam de Hepburn (d. before 1371), in the reign of David II, had a charter of the lands of Traprain, and Southalls and Northalls (united as Hailes) in Haddingtonshire, as well as the lands of Mersingtoun, Cockburnspath, and Rollanstoun in Berwickshire.

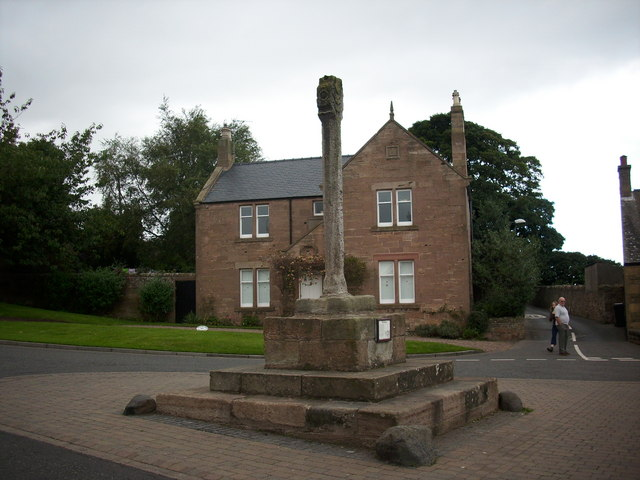
The Market Cross

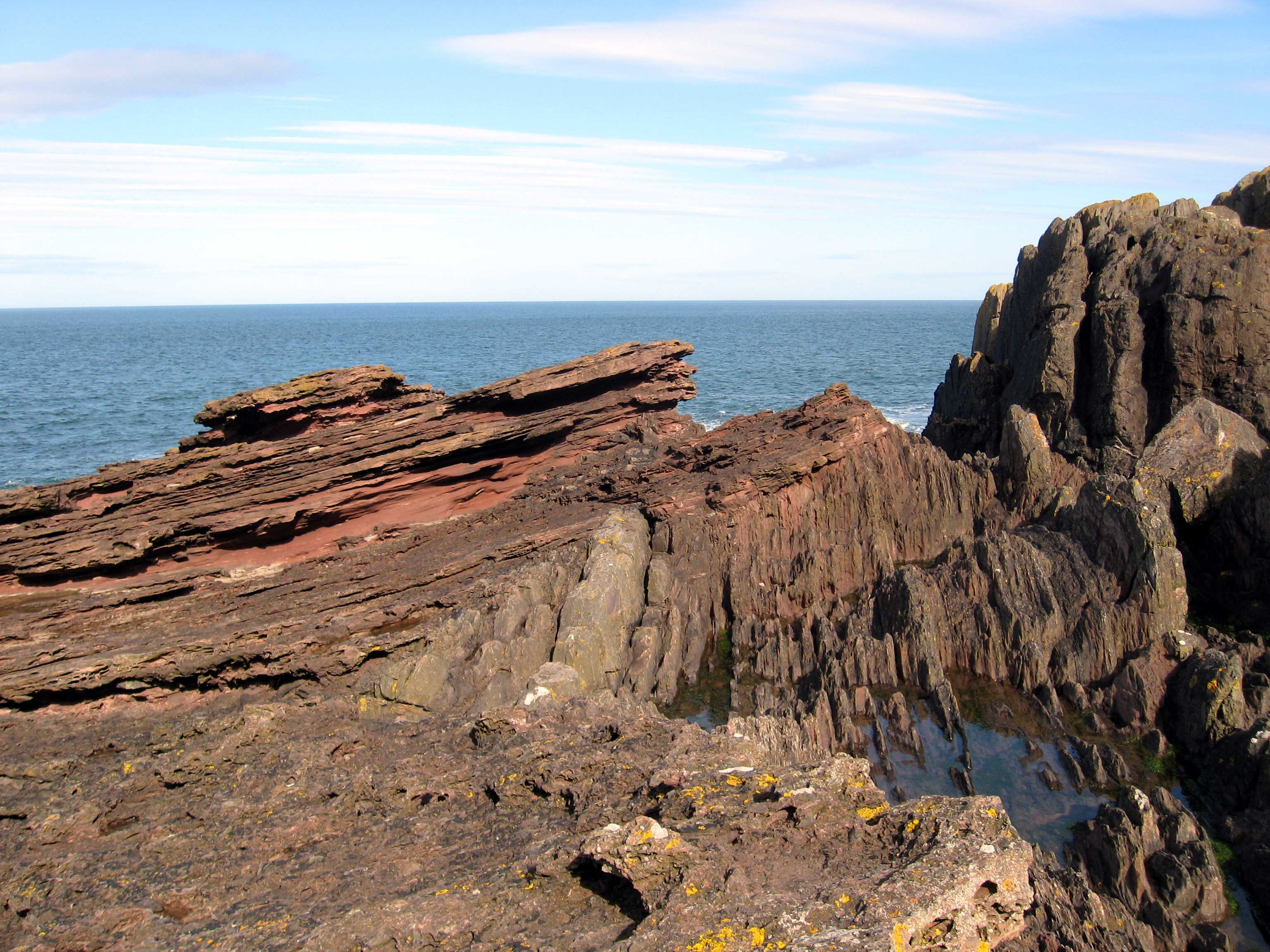
'Hutton's Unconformity' at Siccar Point shows gently sloping Devonian Old Red Sandstone layers forming an eroded capping over much older vertically bedded Silurian greywacke rocks.

The lands of Cockburnspath must have at some point reverted to the Crown as they were part of the dowry given by James IV of Scotland to Margaret Tudor (daughter of Henry VII of England) on their marriage in 1503. This was known as the Marriage of the Thistle and the Rose, representing the Scottish and English national symbols. The 16th century market cross in the heart of the village has carved emblems of a thistle on two of its faces and a rose on the other two.

The marriage cemented the signing of the Treaty of Perpetual Peace between Scotland and England in 1502; the peace was short-lived and James was killed at the Battle of Flodden, just across the border in Northumberland, in 1513. This dynastic marriage did, however, lead to the Union of the Crowns in 1603 when James VI of Scotland also became James I of England, on the death of Elizabeth I of England.

In the 19th century Cockburnspath was a favourite summer haunt of many Scottish artists who painted the village, farm workers and the surrounding scenery. The village's picturesque scenery captivated both James Guthrie and Edward Arthur Walton who shared a house there in 1883.

Dunglass, just to the west of the town, was the home of the geologist Sir James Hall who, in the Spring of 1788, joined John Playfair and James Hutton in a boat trip from Dunglass Burn east along the coast looking for evidence to support Hutton's theory that rock formations were laid down in an unending cycle over immense periods of time. They found examples of Hutton's Unconformity at several places, particularly an outcrop at Siccar Point sketched by Sir James Hall. As Playfair later recalled, "The mind seemed to grow giddy by looking so far back into the abyss of time". Hutton's work influenced later geologists, particularly Charles Lyell and Charles Darwin.

The parish church has an unusual round tower. There is also the mediaeval Dunglass Collegiate Church at the border with East Lothian, maintained by Historic Scotland and open to the public.

Nearby Fast Castle was a fictional setting for Walter Scott's novel The Bride of Lammermuir, which in turn inspired Donizetti's opera Lucia di Lammermuir. The Lammermuir Hills form the area of high moorland running west from the village on which the Border abbeys had their sheep farms, or walks, in the Middle Ages.

== Notable people ==
- John Broadwood (1732–1812), born in Cockburnspath, was the Scottish founder of the piano manufacturer Broadwood and Sons

== See also ==
- List of places in the Scottish Borders
- List of places in East Lothian
- List of places in Edinburgh
- List of places in Midlothian
- List of places in West Lothian
- List of places in Scotland
