= Para surfing =

Sport

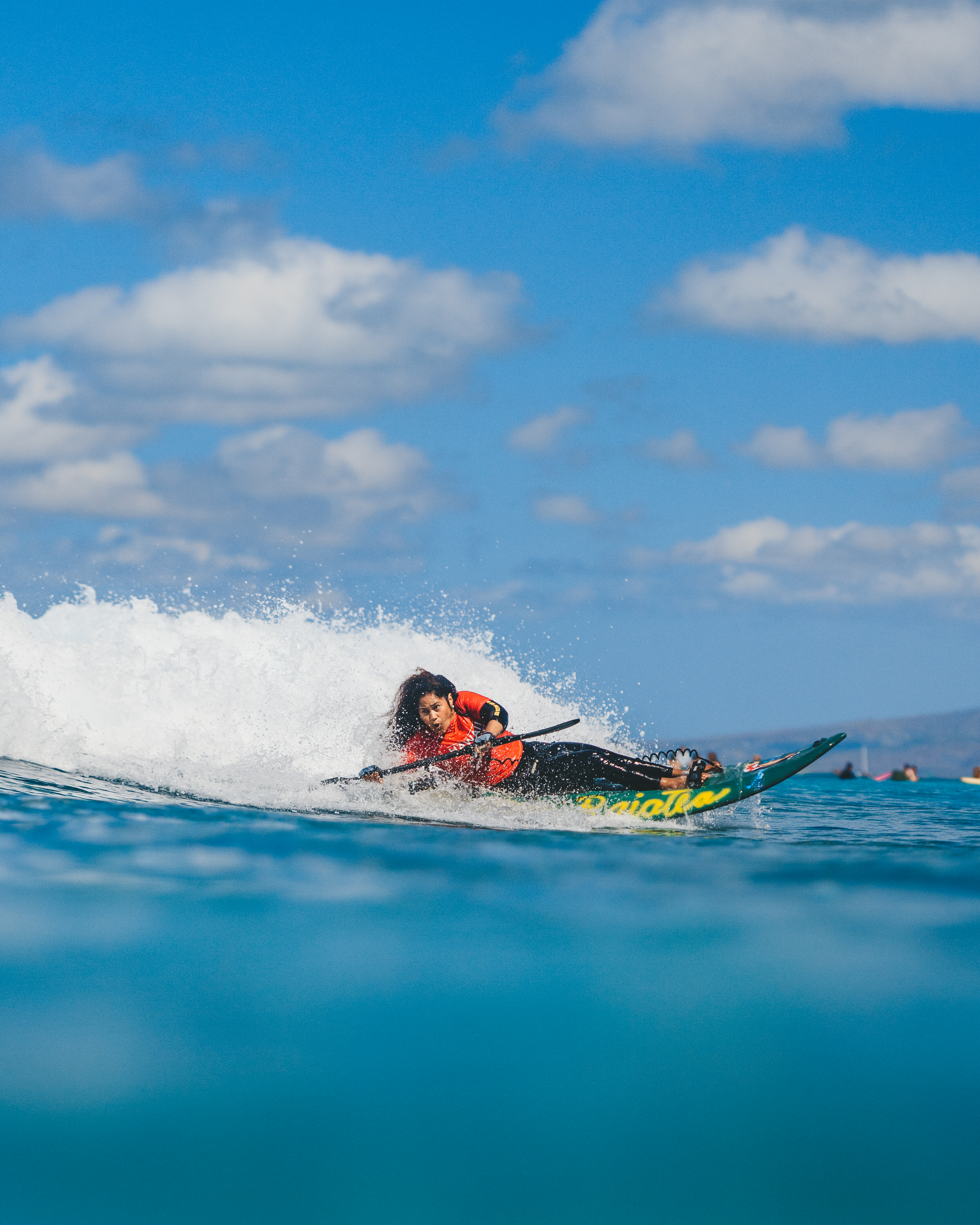
Meira Nelson on a waveski at the 2022 Hawaii Adaptive Surfing Championships

Para surfing or adaptive surfing is a form of surfing in which a disabled individual uses a board or waveski to ride on a breaking wave. Competitively, the International Surfing Association (ISA) has hosted the World Para Surfing Championships annually since 2015. In addition, the Association of Adaptive Surfing Professionals (AASP) was formed in 2022 as the international governing body of professional adaptive surfing, and administers the AASP World Tour including events in Hawaii, Australia and California for its inaugural year.

Adaptive surfers are classified into different competitive divisions based on their respective disabilities, with classification generally certified by medical professionals for professional competitions. There are currently nine separate divisions recognized by the ISA and AASP.

== History ==
The first adaptive surfing organization, Life Rolls On, was created in 2001 by Jesse Billauer, an aspiring professional surfer who sustained a spinal cord injury in 1996. The organization holds multiple "They Will Surf Again" events each year to help disabled individuals learn adaptive surfing.

In 2006, Duke's Oceanfest with the help of AccesSurf Hawaii added an adaptive surfing heat as part of its competition. Since 2007 the Hawaii ASC has been held annually sustaining the platform of adaptive surfing and raising it to a professional level.

In 2015, the ISA hosted the first World Para Surfing Championships (originally called the World Adaptive Surfing Championships). The inaugural event included 69 competitors from 18 nations. Most recently, the 2022 event featured 181 athletes from 28 nations.

In 2017 the U.S. Open Adaptive Surfing Championships was born as the first professional adaptive surfing championship to offer a cash prize pool purse for all podium winners and was also the first to implement priority judging. The U.S. Open ASC was born following the standard set by AccesSurf and the Hawaii ASC as a professional platform.

In September 2019 and March 2020, para surfers underwent reorganization into more balanced sport categories, which took into account factors like their underlying health conditions, eligible impairments, and specific impairment criteria. Additionally, a conceptual framework was established to provide guidance for classification decisions and to lay the groundwork for future research in this field.

In 2022, the Association of Adaptive Surfing Professionals was formed to be the international governing body of professional adaptive surfing, and to organize a tour of events for adaptive surfing professionals. In its inaugural year, the tour hosted 2 events, the Hawaii Adaptive Surfing Championships, and the US Open Adaptive Surfing Championships. Surfers were allotted points based on results in each contest, and those with the highest point totals were crowned world tour champions and were able to award over $100,000 to adaptive athletes in its first year.

The Para Surf League launched in 2022 to organize Para Surfing competitions around the world. The Para Surf League Series will be organizing events in Costa Rica, Spain, Wales, France and more.

== Classification ==
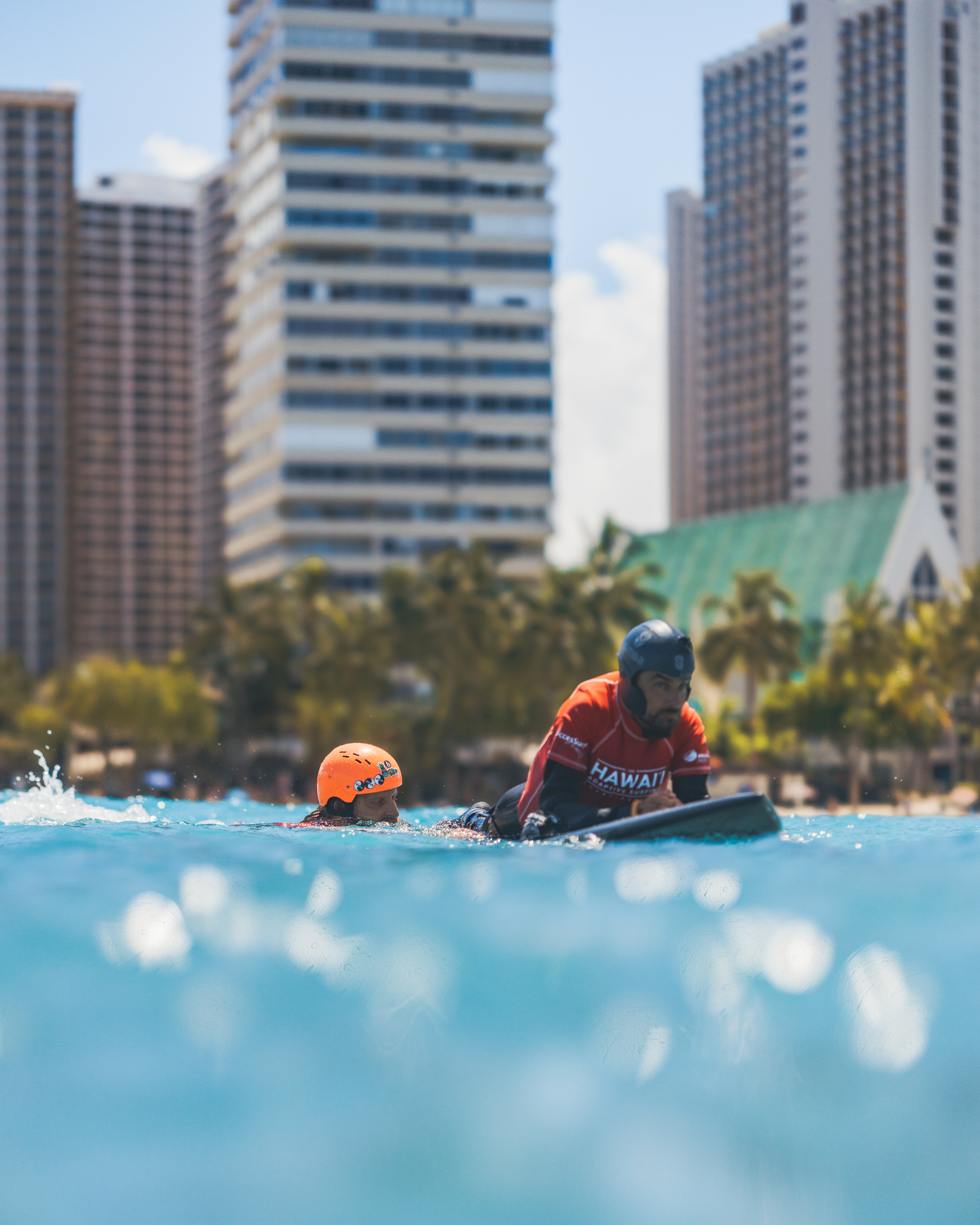
Jesse Billauer, a para surfing prone 2 surfer, paddling out with assistance at the 2022 Hawaii Adaptive Surfing Championships

In 2018 Dr. Maureen Johnson PhD, MS, OT/L, BCPR, C/NDT, Stoke for Life Foundation and the U.S. Open Adaptive Surfing Championships developed and copy wrote the current classification system being used by the AASP and ISA. The ISA adopted the classification system in 2020. The ISA and the AASP each recognize the same nine divisions of adaptive surfing.

Adaptive Surfing Classifications
Division	Description
Upper Limb Stand or Para Surfing Stand 1	Any surfer who rides a wave in a standing position with an upper limb amputation or congenital or impairment equivalent or short stature.
Below Knee Stand or Para Surfing Stand 2	Any surfer who rides a wave in a standing position with a below the knee amputation or congenital or impairment equivalent, or leg length difference.
Above Knee Stand or Para Surfing Stand 3	Any surfer who rides a wave in a standing position with an above the knee amputation or both lower extremity amputations or congenital or impairment equivalent.
Any Knee/Kneeling or Para Surfing Kneel	A surfer who has either both lower limbs amputated above the knee, is kneeling or sitting without using a paddle, or has a congenital handicap equal to one of these conditions.
Waveski or Para Surfing Sit	A surfer who does not need assistance to safely get on their board and paddle into a wave while in a sitting position.
Unassisted Prone or Para Surfing Prone 1	Any surfer who can get into a wave and safely get back on the board while riding the wave in a prone position.
Prone Assist or Para Surfing Prone 2	Anybody who rides a wave in a prone position and does need help getting into the water, paddling into a wave, and safely getting back on the board.
Blind/No Vision or Para Surfing Vision Impairment 1	Any surfer who rides a wave in a standing position with IBSA classification Level B1.
Partial Vision Impairment or Para Surfing Vision Impairment 2	Any surfer who rides a wave in a standing position with IBSA classification Level B2 and Level B3.

== Events ==
=== ISA ===
The ISA Para Surfing World Championships hosts Olympic style surfing competitions. The competitions began in 2015 and were hosted on Pismo beach, but are now being hosted on Huntington Beach since 2023. The competition has a round-robin format where each surfer gets to compete twice. The surfers are ranked according to the total of their best two waves from either heat.

In the vision impairment division of the ISA Para Surfing Championship Matt Formston, of Australia, is the champion of years 2017, 2018, and 2020.

2021 was the first time that the ISA Para Surfing World Championships were held outside of the San Diego area.

In 2023 a record was set for the event with 183 competitors competing in the event for 27 different countries.

=== AASP ===
The Hawaii Adaptive Surfing Championships take place annually in Waikiki. Produced by local nonprofit AccesSurf, the competition grew from an event held as part of Duke's Oceanfest in 2006, since 2007 the Hawaii ASC has been held annually sustaining the platform of adaptive surfing and raising it to a professional level. They became a standalone event in 2019 breaking away from Dukes Ocean Festival.

In 2023, the Adaptive Surfing Open Pro Costa Rica will be held at Boca Barranca in Puntarenas.

The U.S. Open of Adaptive Surfing Championships are held annually in Oceanside, California, produced by local non profit Stoke for Life Foundation and is the last of three events on the AASP World Tour. They were first held in 2017.

=== PSL ===
The first Para Surf League contest of 2023 will be the SA Para Surf League Open, at Muizenberg Beach in Cape Town, South Africa.

The Para Surf League and USA Surfing will hold the United States National Championships in Oceanside, CA. US Citizens competing in this contest will be eligible for selection to the USA Surfing National Para Surf team.

The Para Surf League Open Costa Rica will take place at Playa Jaco, Garabito, Puntarenas as the third stop of the Para Surf League Series in 2023.

The European leg of the PSL will have contests in Spain, Wales, and France with the 2023 Para Surf League Open España 2023 Para Surf League Open España, the 2023 Welsh Para Surf Champs and Para Surf League Open, and the 2023 OPEN DE FRANCE #2 et Open de la Para Surf League Euro Cont. Champs.

=== Other ===
The 2022 English Adaptive Surfing Open ran at The Wave in Bristol, England.

== Paralympics ==
Para surfing was one of 33 sports, including ten new sports, with submitted applications to the International Paralympic Committee for inclusion into the LA28 Paralympic Games. The IPC has put Para Surfing on the short list of sports for further consideration for inclusion, and a final decision for inclusion will be made by the end of 2023.

== See also ==
- Surf therapy
