= Adaptive Physical Education Australia =

Adaptive Physical Education (APE) is a physical education program that accommodates the needs of students with disabilities, that may include or be a combination of mobility or physical impairments, sensory impairments, intellectual disabilities, emotional or behavioural disorders. Physical education is important for the health and wellbeing of everyone, regardless of disabilities or not. APE programs are vital in maintaining and enhancing the quality of life for people with disabilities.

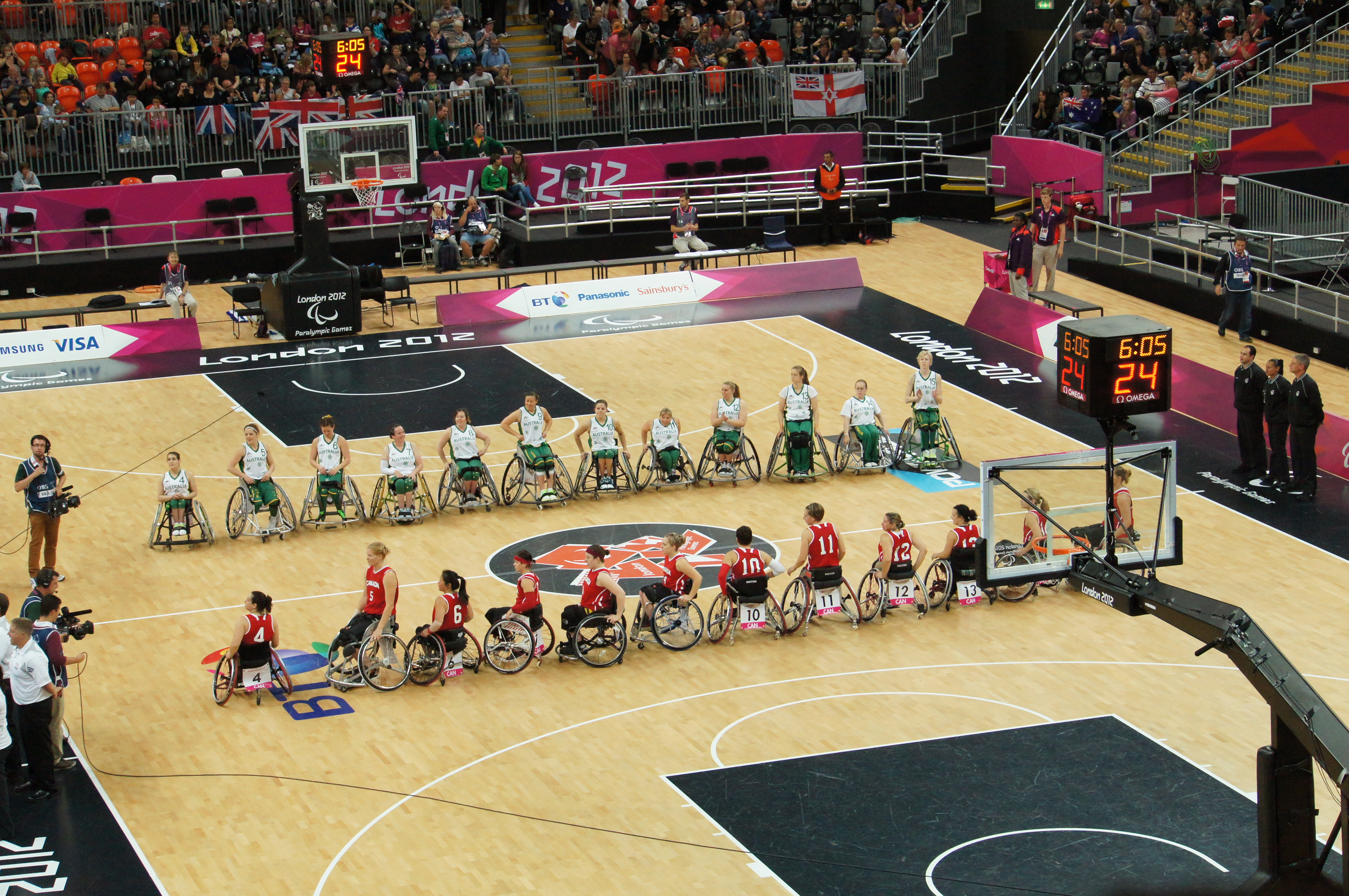
Wheelchair basketball Paralympics

Australia’s physical education curriculum for adaptive students is currently the same as students without disabilities. Australian education institutions are required by the Disability Discrimination Act 1992 and the Disability Standards for Education 2005 to instruct physical education to students with disabilities.

== History ==
Adaptive physical education evolved from medical treatments that were designed to cope with disabilities. In 1838, Perkins School located in Boston, Massachusetts, an educational institute for visually impaired students, began introducing physical education programs for their students. In the 1870s, the Ohio school for the Deaf instituted organised sports into the school for their students. Pehr Henrik Ling, who founded the Swedish School of Sports and Health Sciences in 1813 in Stockholm, Sweden developed medical gymnastic programs for people with disabilities in 1884.

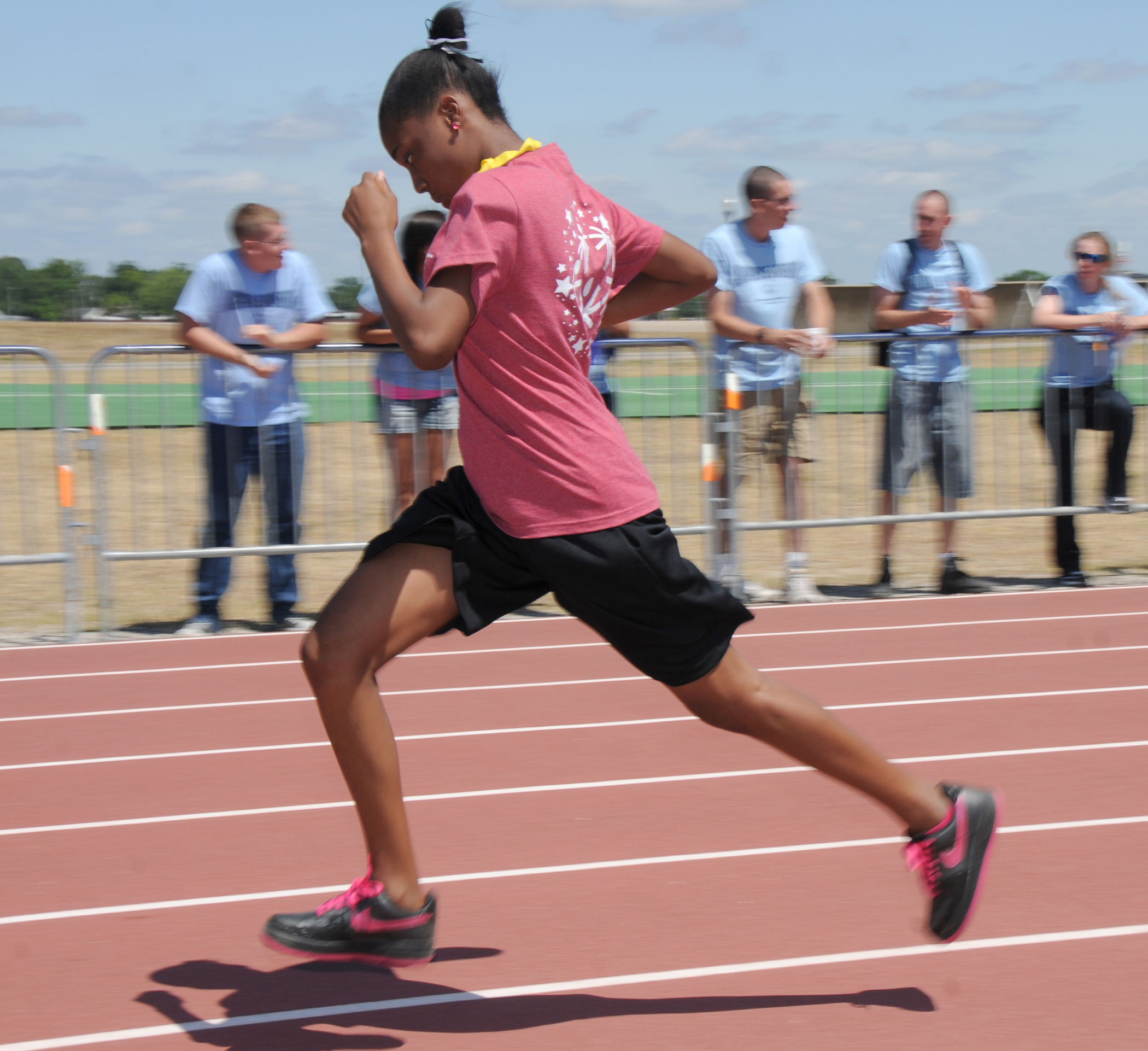
Special Olympian Diona Bell dashes by a group of U.S. Airmen to win the gold medal in the 100-meter run at the Mississippi Special Olympics Summer Games, hosted by Keesler Air Force Base (AFB) in Biloxi, Miss. 110514-F-BD983-011

== Legislation ==
The legislation for the APE in Australia is as follows:

- Disability Discrimination Act 1992 provides protection against any person that is discriminated against because of a disability.
- Disability Standards for Education 2005 defines the responsibilities of educational institutions for students with disabilities. It also ensures that students with disabilities have access and are engaging in education on the same basis as students without disabilities.

== Impairments and Disabilities ==
=== Mobility or Physical Impairments ===
==== Cerebral Palsy ====
- Cerebral palsy is a group of disorders that affects a person's motor control areas in the brain that hinders their ability to move. It can affect one or more body parts.

==== Brain Injuries ====
- Brain injuries are injuries that diminish or impair physical, cognitive, social, behaviour or emotional functions of a person.

==== Spinal Cord Disabilities ====
- Spinal cord disabilities are damage to the vertebrae or nerves of the spinal column resulting from disease or injury. Spinal cord injuries are generally associated with a degree of paralysis.

==== Muscular, Joint, & Central nervous system (CNS) Disabilities ====
- Muscular, joint, and CNS disabilities are generally progressive and degenerative diseases. They can cause atrophied muscles, reduce motor skills, shorten range of motion and hinder the ability to perform physical activities.
  - Muscular dystrophy is a genetically inherited disease characterised by a progressive spread of weakness through various muscle groups or motor neurones.
  - Juvenile rheumatoid arthritis causes persistent pain and swelling in joints.

=== Sensory Impairments ===
==== Visual impairments ====
- Visual impairments as defined by the Royal Institute for Deaf and Blind Children (RIDBC) as a limitation to one or more functions of the eye or visual systems.

==== Deaf ====
- Deaf is severe or profound hearing loss that causes insufficient comprehension of auditory information.

==== Deafblind ====
- The Australia Deafblind Council (ADBC) defines deafblindness as an isolated sensory disability that results in a combination of loss to both vision and hearing.

=== Intellectual Disabilities & Emotional, Developmental and Behavioural Disorders ===
- Intellectual disabilities are defined, by the American Association of Intellectual and Developmental Disabilities (AAIDD), as a serious impediment of intellectual functioning and the ability to adapt behaviour in both social and practical skills.
  - Down Syndrome is a genetic condition that causes developmental, intellectual and physical disabilities.
- Emotional and behavioural disorders are generally labeled as having disruptive hyperactive, distracting, withdrawn and/or impetuous behaviour tendencies. These emotional and behavioural disorders can hinder and negatively affect a student's educational capabilities.
  - Autism spectrum disorders are developmental disabilities that affect how persons interact with their environment and the people around them.

=== Disability Specific Guidelines for Instruction of APE ===
Impairments and disabilities for APE students can vary or may even coexist with more than one disability. A students physical capabilities in APE will depend on their impairment or disability. These impairments and/or disabilities need to be addressed in the design of the students APE curriculum by their teachers or instructors of APE to ensure that the student is receiving the most beneficial physical educational program.

=== Mobility Impairments ===
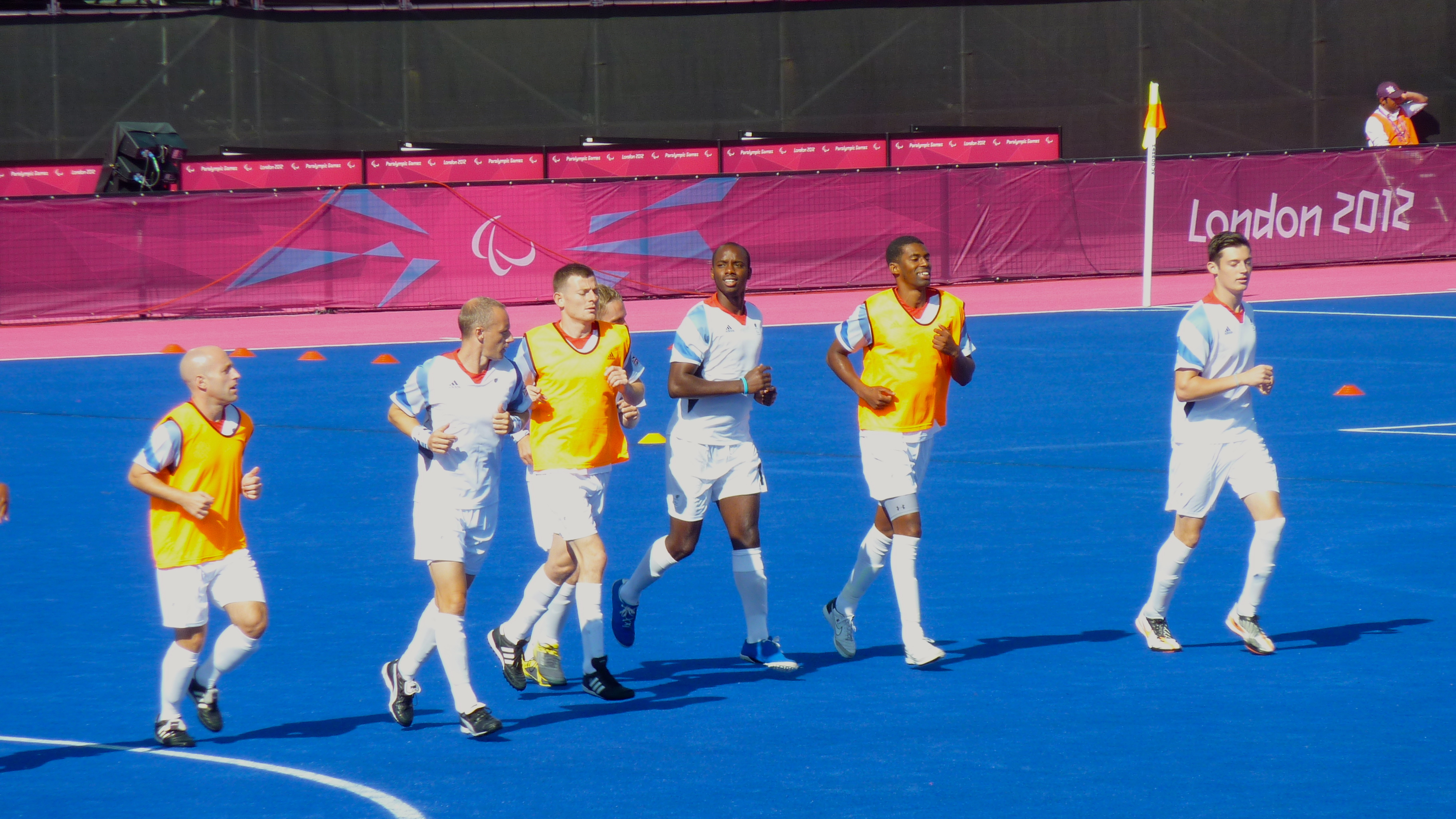
People with Cerebral Palsy competing in the Paralympic Games

==== Cerebral Palsy ====
- Students with cerebral palsy should carryout moderate aerobic activity for body composition and musculoskeletal functioning. Strength and flexibility training should be focused on maintaining a balance between flexor and extensor muscles. Motor coordination for students with cerebral palsy can be difficult, so balance and body coordination should be integrated into their APE program.

==== Brain Injuries ====
- Students of APE that have sustained brain injuries will commonly display balance problems and weak muscle movement. These students need to maintain moderate aerobic activity for body composition and musculoskeletal functioning. Strength training should be integrated to improve muscle weakness and motor control skills may need to be relearned.

==== Spinal Cord Disabilities ====
- Depending on the type of spinal cord disability that a student displays, will determine the type activities that are included in their APE program. Regardless of their spinal cord disability, these students need to engage in APE.

==== Muscular, Joint, & Central Nervous System (CNS) disabilities ====
- Students that have muscular, joint, or CNS disabilities need to engage in strength training and endurance activities for as long as capably possible, due to the progressive nature of these disabilities. The APE teacher should ensure that an adequate warm-up and cool-down focusing on flexibility are performed by the students.

=== Sensory Impairments ===
==== Visual impairments ====
- Students with visual impairments have the capabilities to perform all the same physical activities as students without these impairments. However, due to lack or loss of vision, adaptations to some physical activities will need to be made for these students. Depending on the extent of their impairment, APE teachers can introduce bright colours balls or use audial cues to direct the students in physical activities. APE programs for these students should include open sports where there are changing variables, and closed sports where the activity is consistent and predictable.

==== Deaf ====
- Students that are deaf have no limitations to their physical capabilities. However, communication skills will need to be adapted for their impairment.

==== Deafblind ====
- Students that have deafblindness have the ability to perform same physical activities as students without deafblindness. However, due to their impairment, adaptations that are used for blind and deaf students will need to be implemented into their APE program.

=== Intellectual Disabilities & Emotional and Behavioural Disorders ===
Students with intellectual disabilities need to have APE programs that are appropriately designed and take into consideration their academic, physical, motor, social and emotional skills.

Students with emotional and behavioural disorders can create instructional dilemmas for APE teachers. Ideas for managing and instructing APE to these students are to have interpersonal communication, active listening, verbal mediation and conflict resolution schemes incorporated into the students physical education program.

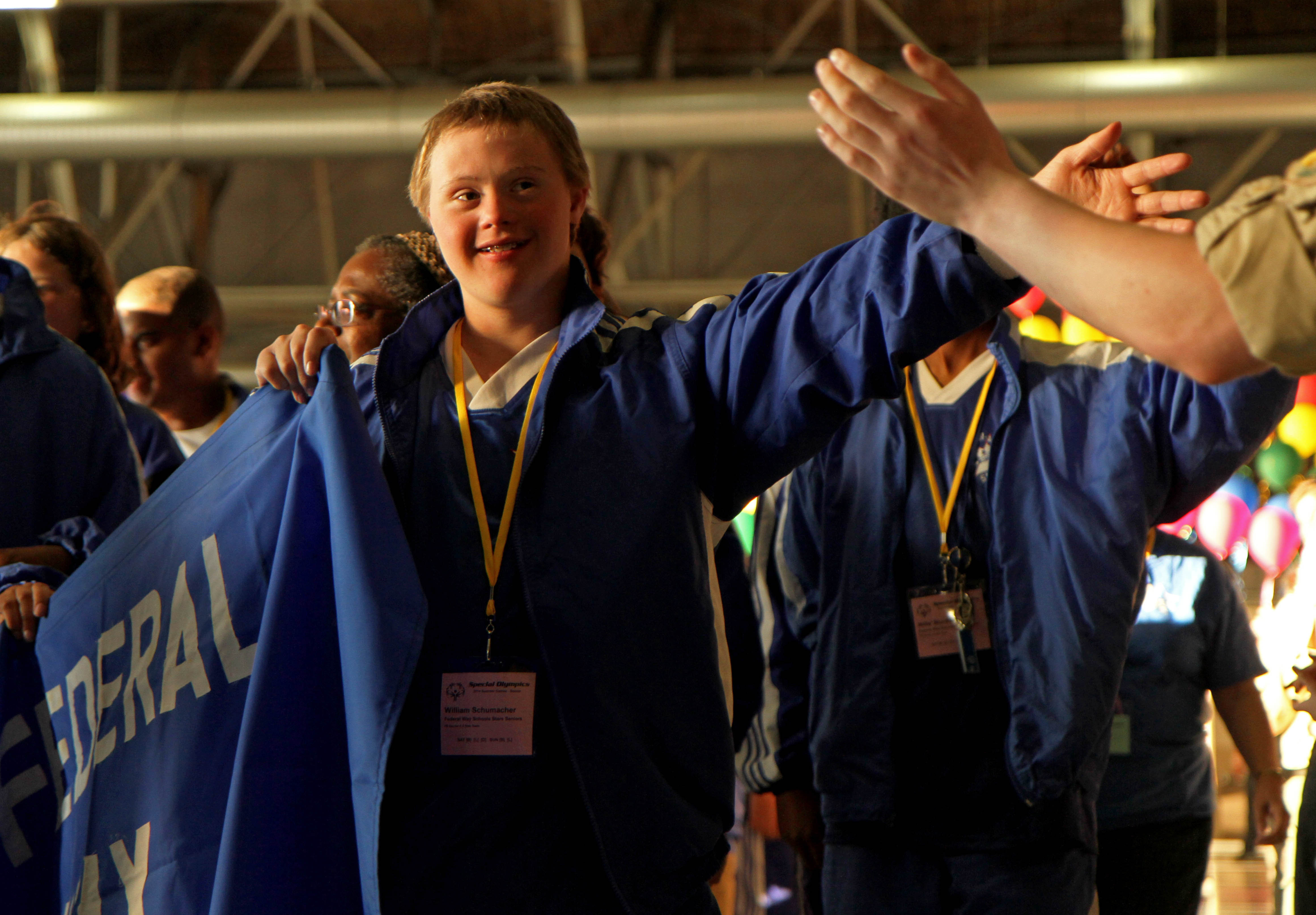
Down Syndrome students competing in Special Olympics

==== Down Syndrome ====
- Students with Down Syndrome that participate in APE need medical clearance due to the many medical problems they face. However they should still engage in aerobic activities, muscle strengthening, motor control skills, and balance building activities. Adapted equipment can be used to engage students in these activities.

==== Autism spectrum disorder ====
- Students that have been diagnosed with an autism spectrum disorder do not necessarily need to be in an APE program. However, if it is decided that they need to participate in an APE program, the APE teacher needs to respond to the individual needs required by that student, which may be one-on-one instruction. These students should engage in as much of the required PE curriculum as possible.

== See also ==
Disability

Special Olympics

Special Education

Paralympics Games
