= Surf therapy =

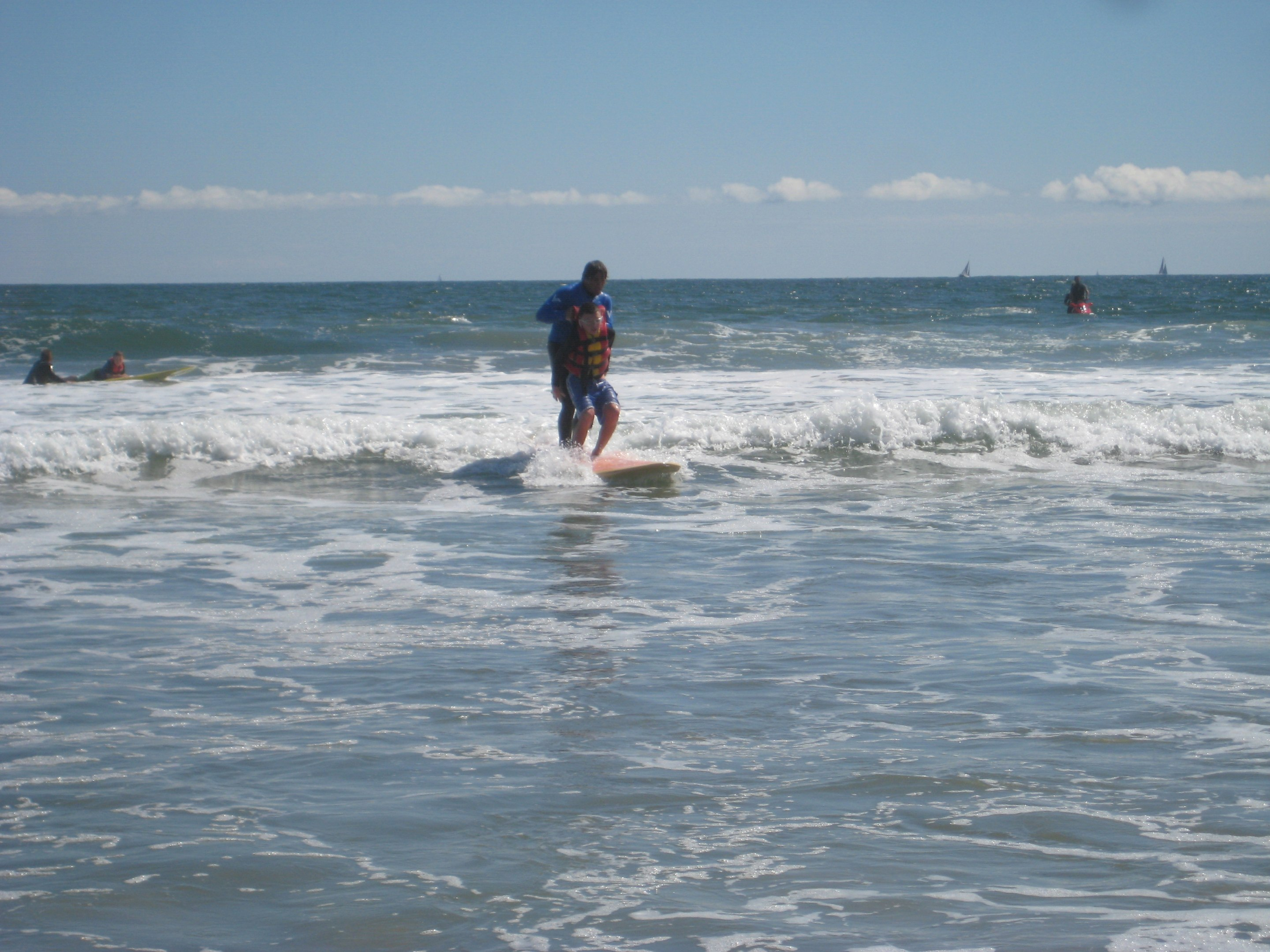
Surfers Healing programme, Israel

Surf therapy is analogous to nature therapy and is defined by the International Surf Therapy Organisation in 2017 as a type of mental health intervention that uses surfing and the ocean environment to promote physical and psychological well-being. It combines surf instruction, surfing activities, and structured individual and group activities to support individuals in achieving personal goals and improving their overall health.

Surf therapy is sometimes called adaptive surfing and can become a pathway to para surfing. It can also be related to the concepts of blue care or ocean therapy and thalassotherapy.

== History ==
During the Victorian era, sea swimming was widely believed to have significant health benefits leading to its popularity as a therapeutic and recreational activity. Seaside spa towns became popular destinations in the UK and throughout Europe with physicians recommending sea bathing for various ailments and illnesses.

In 2010 the NHS Cornwall Primary Care Trust (PCT) started a trial six-weeks UK-wide referral-based surf therapy programme called Wave project for vulnerable young children and adults aged 8-21. In 2011 the non-profit Wave Project CIC (community interest company) was established to deliver the programme full scale.

In Australia surf therapy uses findings and approaches developed within Adaptive physical education framework.

In 2011 a Cape Town local organisation Waves for Change, headed by an English former graduate Tim Conibear, received a grant in 2017 to organise a meeting of practitioners from different countries. Thus the International Surf Therapy Organisation (ISTO) was created and has been since monitoring the research work and surf therapy programmes that have been developed around the world.

There are a large number of such programmes worldwide targeting different individual profiles: women who have been victims of violence, young people from difficult social backgrounds, people with disabilities, and even war veterans.

One of the first international surf therapy instructor certification programs run by the International Surfing Association was launched in LaJolla, California in 2020.

== Measurement ==
In recent years a number of academic studies were conducted to understand better the concept and its effective therapeutic application, as well as to systematise the body of knowledge and the practices for further programming and field application.

== See also ==
- Nature therapy
- Para surfing
- Thalassotherapy
