= List of Sites of Special Scientific Interest in Tweeddale and Ettrick and Lauderdale =

The following is a list of Sites of Special Scientific Interest in the Tweeddale and Ettrick and Lauderdale Area of Search. For other areas, see List of SSSIs by Area of Search.

- Airhouse Wood
- Akermoor Loch
- Ashkirk Loch
- Auchencorth Moss
- Avenel Hill and Gorge
- Bemersyde Moss
- Blind Moss
- Catshawhill
- Clarilaw Grasslands
- Colmsliehill Junipers
- Craigdilly
- Craigengar
- Dolphinton - West Linton Fens and Grassland
- Dunhog Moss
- Faldonside Loch
- Gattonside Moss
- Glenkinnon Burn
- Gordon Moss
- Grieston Quarry
- Henderland Bank
- Hermanlaw and Muckra Cleuchs
- Kingside Loch
- Kirkhope Linns
- Lammer Law
- Lindean Reservoir
- Lynslie Burn
- Makerstoun - Corbie Craigs to Trows' Craigs
- Moffat Hills
- Moorfoot Hills
- Mount Bog
- Newhall Glen
- Newtown St Boswells Woods
- North Esk Valley
- Nut Wood
- Plora Wood
- Riskinhope
- River Tweed
- Selkirk Racecourse Moss
- St Mary's Loch
- Thornylee Quarry
- Threepwood Moss
- Tweedsmuir Hills
- Tweedwood - Gateheugh
- Westwater Reservoir
- Whim Bog
- Whitlaw Mosses
- Whitlaw Rig
- Whitmuirhall Loch
- Williamhope
- Windy Gowl/Carlops Dean
