= List of Sites of Special Scientific Interest in Berwickshire and Roxburgh =

The following is a list of Sites of Special Scientific Interest (SSSIs) in the Berwickshire and Roxburgh Area of Search. For other areas, see List of SSSIs by Area of Search.

- Abbey St Bathans Woodlands (Note: Part of Abbey St Bathans Woodlands SSSI is part of the River Tweed Special Area of Conservation (SAC) due to the habitats and species present. Part of Abbey St Bathans Woodlands SSSI is part of the River Tweed SSSI due to the habitats and species present.)
- Adderstonlee Moss
- Alemoor West Loch and Meadow (Note: Part of Alemoor West Loch and Meadow SSSI is part of the River Tweed SSSI due to the habitat present.)
- Allan Water, Hillhead
- Ashkirk Loch
- Berwickshire Coast (Intertidal) (Note: Berwickshire Coast (Intertidal) SSSI covers the intertidal portions of Burnmouth Coast SSSI and St Abbs Head to Fast Castle Head SSSI. It also includes the un-notified intertidal areas between Eyemouth and St Abbs. At the English border it joins with the Northumberland Shore SSSI and the Northumbria Coast Special Protection Area (SPA) as designated by Natural England. Part of Berwickshire Coast (Intertidal) SSSI is designated part of Berwickshire and North Northumberland Coast SAC jointly by NatureScot and Natural England due to the habitats and species present.)
- Branxholme Easter Loch
- Branxholme Wester Loch (Note: Branxholme Wester Loch SSSI is part of Whitlaw and Branxholme SAC due to the habitats and species present.)
- Buckstruther Moss
- Burnmouth Coast (Note: The intertidal portions of Burnmouth Coast SSSI are covered by Berwickshire Coast (Intertidal) SSSI. The same portions of Burnmouth Coast SSSI are part of Berwickshire and North Northumberland Coast SAC. At the English border Burmouth Coast SSSI is contigious with Northumberland Shore SSSI and Northumbria Coast SPA (See note to Berwickshire Coast (Intertidal) SSSI for more information.))
- Catshawhill
- Coldingham Common, Long Moss
- Coldingham Loch
- Cragbank and Wolfehopelee (Note: Cragbank and Wolfehopelee SSSI is part of Border Woods SAC due to the woodland habitats present.)
- Crook Burn, Dyeshaugh
- Drone Moss
- Foulden Burn
- Gordon Moss
- Greenlaw Moor
- Hareheugh Craigs
- Hoselaw Loch and Din Moss
- Hummelknowes Moss
- Jedwater Woodlands (Note: Part of Jedwater Woodlands SSSI is designated part of the River Tweed SAC due to the habitats and species present.)
- Kershope Bridge
- Kielderhead Moors : Carter Fell to Peel Fell
- Kingside Loch
- Kippilaw Moss
- Kirkton Burn Meadow
- Lammer Law
- Langholm - Newcastleton Hills (Note: Langholm - Newcastleton Hills SSSI is designated Langholm - Newcastleton Hills SPA due to the presence of the hen harrier.)
- Langton Lees Cleugh
- Lennel, Charley's Brae (Note: Part of Lennel, Charley's Brae SSSI is part of the River Tweed SSSI due to the habitats and species present.) (Note: Part of Lennel, Charley's Brae SSSI is part of the River Tweed SAC due to the habitats and species present.)
- Lintmill Railway Cutting (Note: Part of Lintmill Railway Cutting SSSI is part of the River Tweed SSSI due to the habitats and species present.) (Note: Part of Lintmill Railway Cutting SSSI is part of the River Tweed SAC due to the habitats and species present.)
- Long Moss - Drinkstone Hill
- Longnewton Cutting
- Lurgie Loch
- Lynnwood - Whitlaw Wood, Slitrig (Note: Lynnwood - Whitlaw Wood, Slitrig SSSI site boundary is adjacent to part of the River Tweed SAC and is adjacent to Whitlaw Bank to Hardies Hill SSSI.) (Note: Whitlaw Bank to Hardies Hill SSSI is part of Border Woods SAC due to the woodlands present.)
- Makerstoun - Corbie Craigs to Trows' Craigs (Note: Parts of Makerstoun - Corbie Craigs to Trows' Craigs SSSI are part of the River Tweed SSSI and the same parts of Makerstoun - Corbie Craigs to Trows' Craigs SSSI are part of the River Tweed SAC.)
- Minto Craigs
- Old Cambus Quarry
- Oxendean Burn
- Palmers Hill Railway Cutting
- Pease Bay Coast
- Pease Bridge Glen
- Redden Bank Lime Works
- River Tweed (Note: The River Tweed SSSI was originally designated the Tweed River SSSI; despite being re-designated the River Tweed SSSI parts are still designated the Tweed River SSSI.) (Note: Part of the River Tweed SSSI is part of Whiteadder Water SSSI. Part of the River Tweed SSSI is part of Lennel, Charley’s Brae SSSI. Part of the River Tweed SSSI is part of Lintmill Railway Cutting SSSI. Part of the River Tweed SSSI is part of Kirkhope Linns SSSI. Part of the River Tweed SSSI is part of St Mary’s Loch SSSI. Part of the River Tweed SSSI is part of Riskinhope SSSI. Part of the River Tweed SSSI is part of Makerstoun - Corbie Craigs to Trows’ Craigs SSSI. Part of the River Tweed SSSI is part of Abbey St Bathans Woodlands SSSI. Part of the River Tweed SSSI is part of Newtown St Boswells Woods SSSI. Part of the River Tweed SSSI os part of Tweedwood - Gateheugh SSSI. The reference gives more information about these overlaps.) (Note: Because the River Tweed forms the border between England and Scotland for approximately 30 kilometres (19 mi), part of the River Tweed SSSI as designated by NatureScot overlaps with the River Till SSSI and the River Tweed-Whiteadder SSSI as designated by Natural England in England.)
- Siccar Point
- Slaidhills Moss (Note: Slaidhills Moss SSSI is part of Whitlaw and Branxholme SAC due to the habitats and species present.)
- St Abb's Head to Fast Castle Head (Note: The intertidal part of St Abb's Head to Fast Castle SSSI is designated Berwickshire Coast (intertidal) SSSI.) (Note: St Abb's Head to Fast Castle SSSI is part of St Abb's Head to Fast Castle SPA due to the bird species present. St Abb's Head to Fast Castle SSSI is designated St Abb's Head to Fast Castle SAC due to the habitat (vegetated sea cliffs) present.)
- The Hirsel (Note: The Hirsel SSSI is so designated due to the bird species present. It is near to, but does not include the stately home of the same name (The Hirsel).)
- Whiteadder Water
- Whitlaw Bank to Hardies Hill (Note: See the notes about Lynnwood - Whitlaw Wood, Slitrig SSSI for more information on where this SSSI is adjacent to other SSSIs and SACs.)
- Woodhead Moss
- Yetholm Loch
