= Cove, Scottish Borders =

Village in Scotland

Coordinates: 55.9369°N 2.3521°W

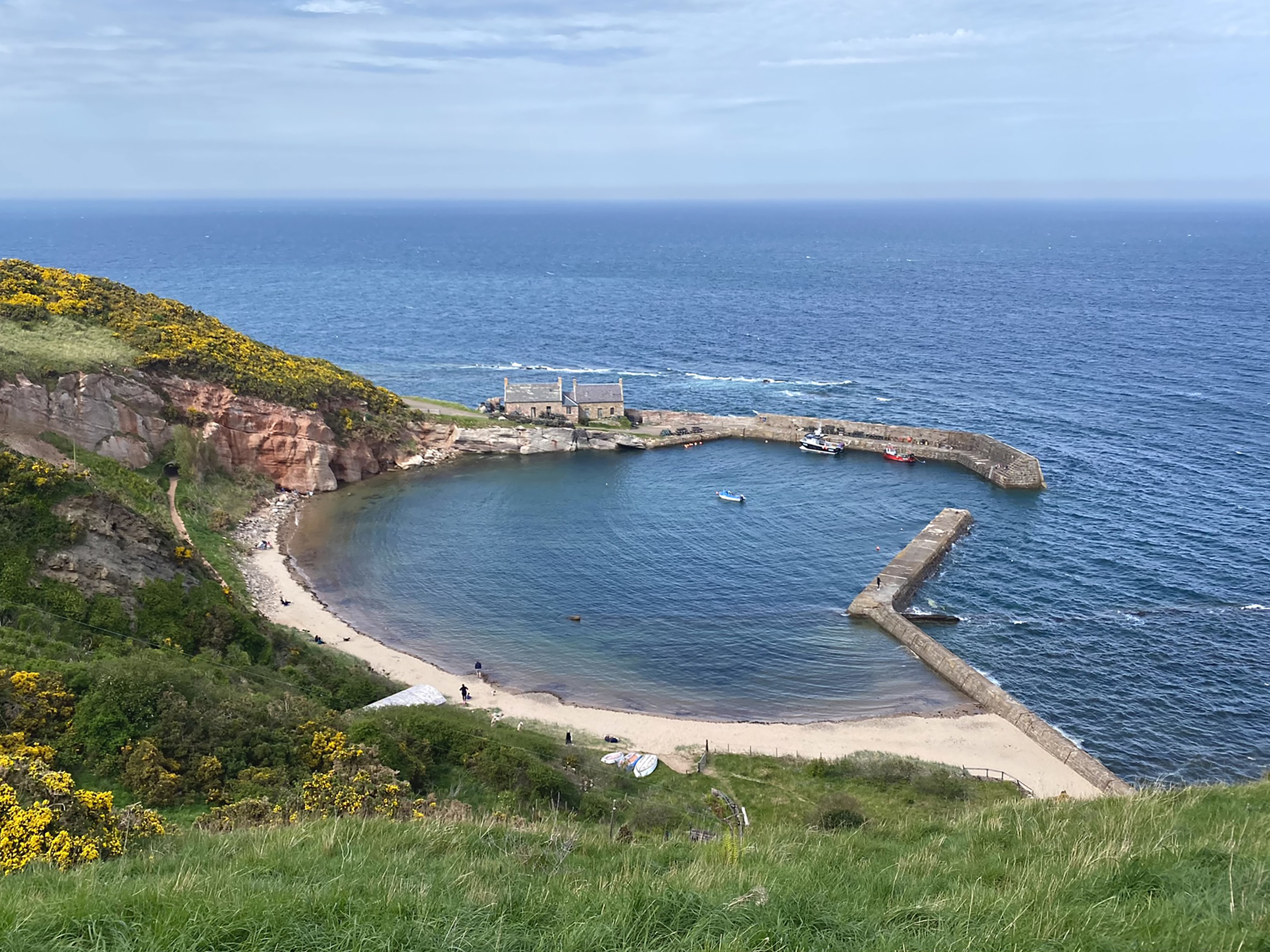
A view of Cove Harbour as seen from the Southern Upland Way

An aerial view of Cove Harbour

Cove is a village in the Scottish Borders area of Scotland, 18 mi (29 km) northwest of the Scotland/England border. It is about 36 miles (58 kilometres) southeast of Edinburgh and 8 mi (13 km) from Dunbar. Cove is close to Cockburnspath, Dunglass, Innerwick, Oldhamstocks, Bilsdean, and, further afield, Dunbar and Eyemouth. The climate is typical for Scotland, with cold, wet winters and variable summer weather, with days of rain and days of temperatures over 20 °C (68 °F).

The nearest railway station is Dunbar, which is on the main East Coast line from London Kings Cross to Edinburgh. There are regular trains both from Dunbar to Edinburgh and southwards to Berwick-upon-Tweed. The nearest bus station is in Cockburnspath which takes passengers north to Edinburgh terminating at St Andrews Square, and southwards, terminating in Berwick.

The rocks that form the approach to the harbour are limestones and sandstones of Carboniferous age. They dip sharply to the N/NW due to the downthrust of the Cove fault about 1/2 mi (800 m) southeast. Beyond the fault, older strata of the Old Red Sandstone of Devonian age can be seen.

The natural harbour was improved in 1831 by the building of a breakwater. Access is via a 100 metre tunnel that runs through the rock. As of Summer 2024 funding is being raised for repairs to the breakwater, which has suffered storm damage on one end.

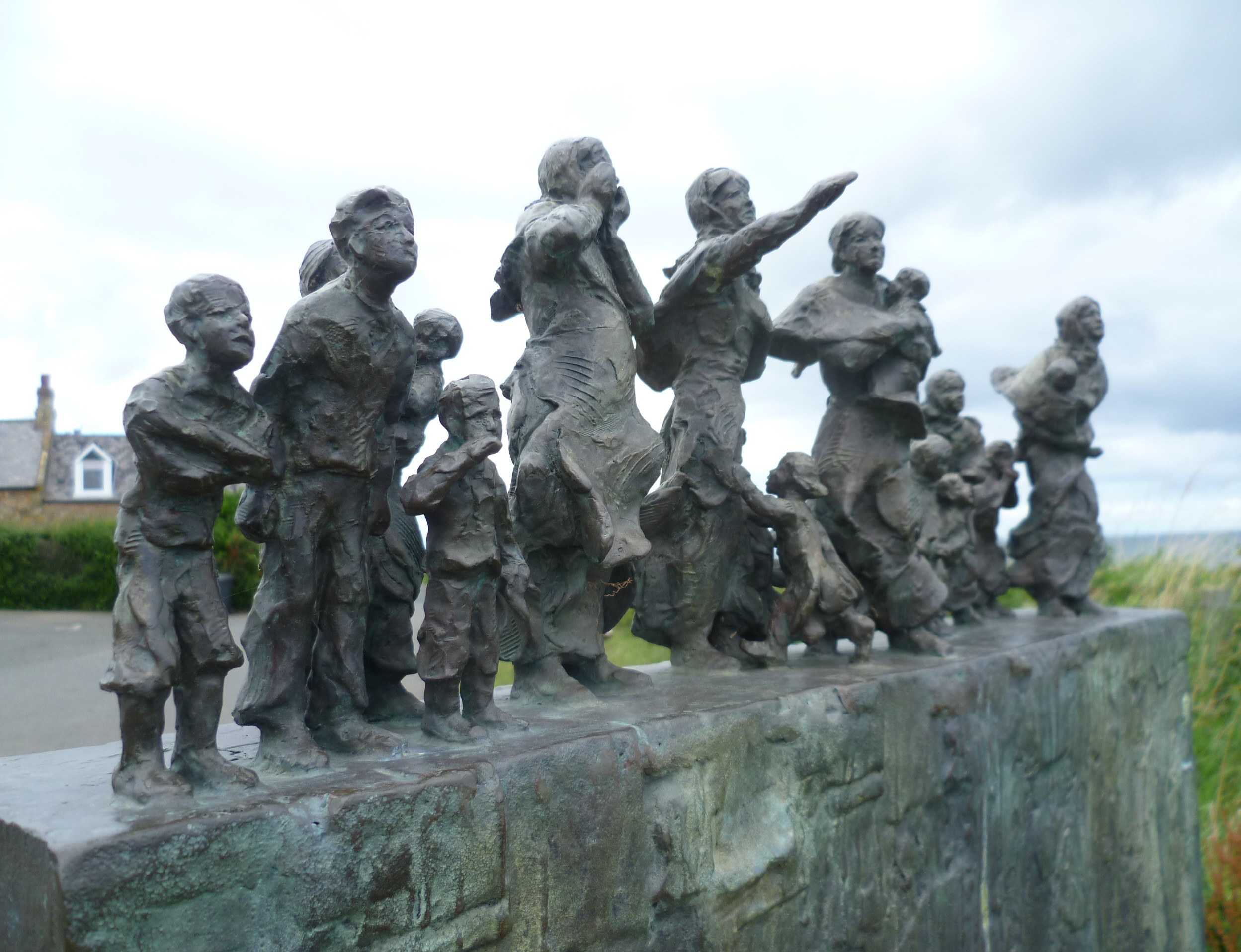
Memorial at Cove

Eleven men from Cove died in the great Eyemouth disaster of 1881. There is a memorial at the top of the cliffs.

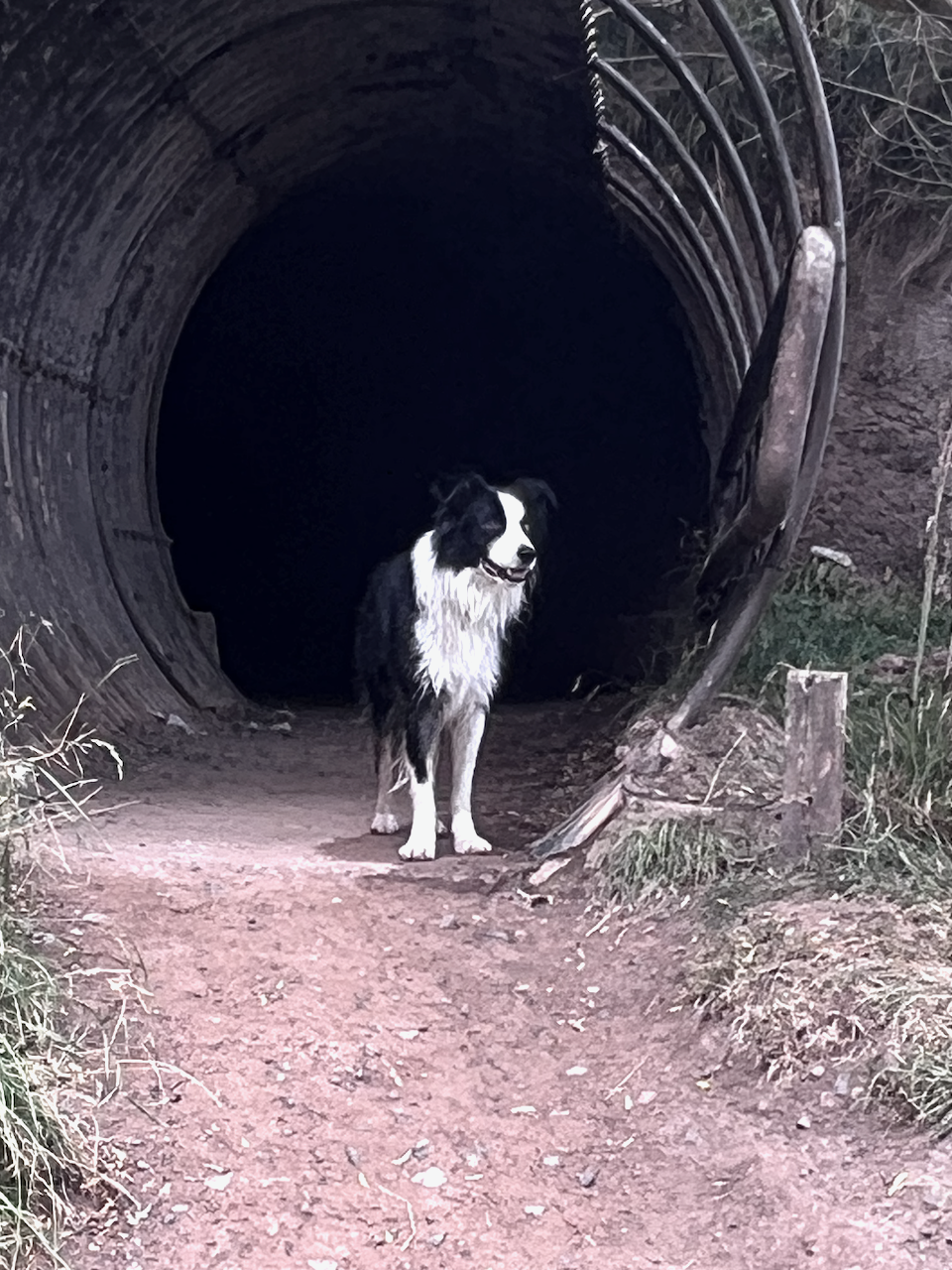
A Border Collie stands at the harbour end of the access tunnel which runs for 100 metres through solid rock

The village has been described by The AA Guide to the British Coast as having more of a Cornish than Scottish air about it. It has no school, shops or post office. There is a shop and post office nearby in the village of Cockburnspath which also has a school. For amenities, such as a pool or a gym, people need to travel to Dunbar, which is also has an ASDA supermarket.

The nearby beaches of Pease Bay (1.4 mi or 2.3 km) and Thorntonloch (3 mi or 5 km) are used for surfing.

Cove is privately owned by the architect Ben Tindall and the Cove Harbour Conservation Ltd.

The Southern Upland Way passes through Cove along the headland and the road in Cove. The John Muir Way passes through Dunbar, about 8 mi (13 km) away.

== See also ==
- List of places in the Scottish Borders
- List of places in Scotland
- Eyemouth disaster
