= List of long-distance footpaths in the United Kingdom =

There are hundreds of long-distance footpaths in the United Kingdom designated in publications from public authorities, guidebooks and OS maps. They are mainly used for hiking and walking, but some may also be designated, in whole or in part, as bridleways for mountain biking and horse riding. Most are in rural landscapes, in varying terrain, some passing through National Parks and Areas of Outstanding Natural Beauty. There is no formal definition of a long-distance path, though the British Long Distance Walkers Association defines one as a route "20 miles [32 km] or more in length and mainly off-road." They usually follow existing rights of way, often over private land, linked and sometimes waymarked to make a named route. Generally, the surface is not specially prepared, with rough ground, uneven surfaces and stiles, which can cause accessibility issues for people with disabilities. Exceptions to this can be converted railways, canal towpaths and some popular fell walking routes where stone-pitching and slabs have been laid to prevent erosion. Many long-distance footpaths are arranged around a particular theme such as one specific range of hills or a historical or geographical connection.

== England and Wales: National Trails ==
National Trails are a network of long-distance paths in England and Wales (plus a small stretch of the Pennine Way in Scotland) funded by Natural England and Natural Resources Wales and maintained by local authorities under a Trail Partnership. As of January 2023, there are over 2,500 miles (4,000 km) of trails on seventeen routes. The longest trail, the King Charles III England Coast Path, was officially opened in March 2026 and was 80% complete at that time. The newest complete trail is the Coast to Coast Walk which also officially opened in March 2026. There are 83 million visits to the National Trails each year and over 80,000 people complete a trail.

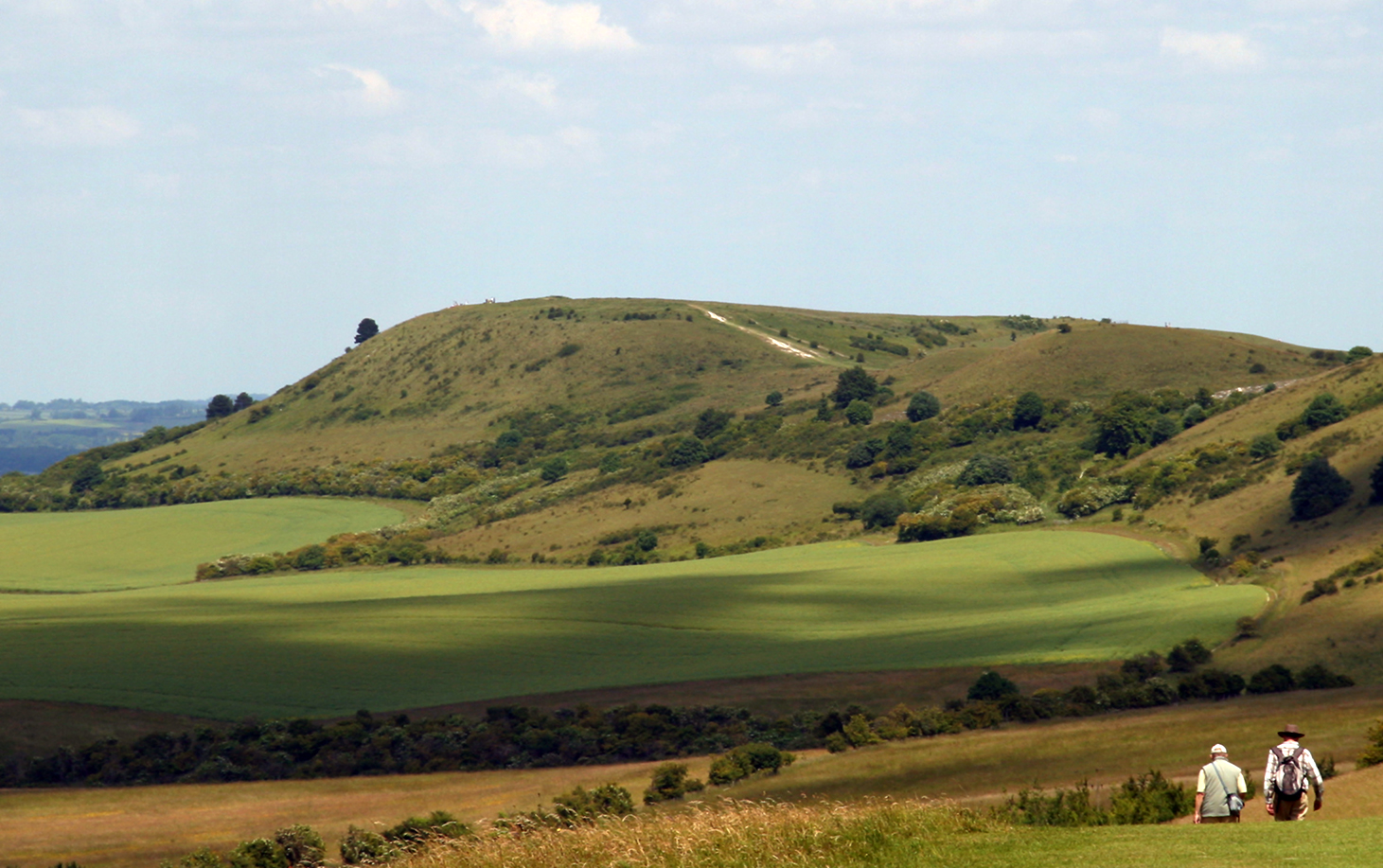
Ivinghoe Beacon (the eastern trailhead) seen looking north from the Ridgeway

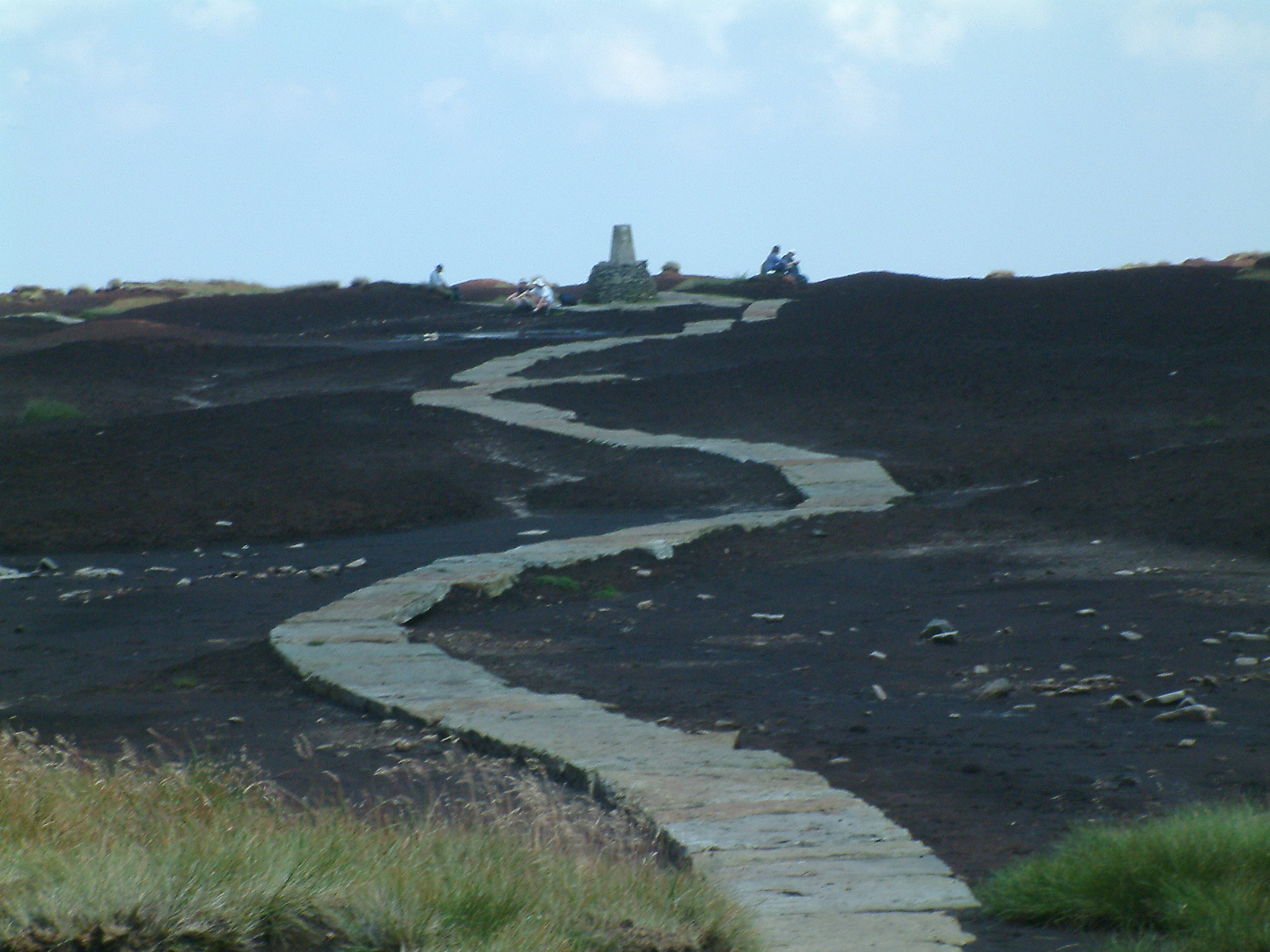
The paved surface of the Pennine Way on Black Hill

Name	Length		Region	Endpoint one	Endpoint two	Description
Name	mi	km	Region	Endpoint one	Endpoint two	Description
Cleveland Way	110	177	North Yorkshire, England	Helmsley	Filey Brigg	Runs around the edge of the North York Moors National Park in a horseshoe configuration.
Cotswold Way	102	164	The Cotswolds, Central England	Chipping Campden, Gloucestershire	Bath, Somerset	Runs along the Cotswold Edge escarpment of the Cotswold Hills.
Coast to Coast Walk	197	317	Cumbria and North Yorkshire, Northern England	St Bees, Cumbria	Robin Hood's Bay, North Yorkshire	Devised and described by Alfred Wainwright in 1973. Announced in 2022 to become a National Trail and officially opened in 2026.
Glyndŵr's Way	135	217	Powys, mid Wales	Knighton	Welshpool	Runs in an extended loop.
Hadrian's Wall Path	84	135	England: Tyne and Wear, Northumberland, Cumbria	Wallsend, Tyne and Wear	Bowness-on-Solway, Cumbria	Runs from the east to west coast along the remains of Hadrian's Wall.
King Charles III England Coast Path	2,795	4,500^{*}	England	N/A	N/A	Will cover the entire coast of England and will be the longest managed and waymarked coastal path in the world.
North Downs Way	153	246	South Eastern England	Farnham, Surrey	Dover, Kent	Passes through the areas of outstanding natural beauty (AONB) of the Surrey Hills and Kent Downs.
Offa's Dyke Path	177	285	Wales–England border	Sedbury, Gloucestershire	Prestatyn, Denbighshire	Follows close to the border near the remnants of Offa's Dyke.
Peddars Way and Norfolk Coast Path^{†}	97	156	England in Suffolk and Norfolk	Knettishall Heath, Knettishall, Suffolk	Cromer, Norfolk	The two paths join at Holme-next-the-Sea.
Pembrokeshire Coast Path	186	299	Pembrokeshire, southwest Wales	Poppit Sands, near St Dogmaels	Amroth	Has a total of 35,000 feet (11,000 m) of ascent and descent and lies almost completely within the Pembrokeshire Coast National Park.
Pennine Bridleway	205	330	Pennines, Northern England	Middleton-by-Wirksworth, Derbyshire	Ravenstonedale, Cumbria	Runs roughly parallel to the Pennine Way.
Pennine Way	267	430	Pennines, Northern England and Southern Scotland	Edale, Derbyshire	Kirk Yetholm, Scottish Borders	Spans the length of the Pennines, according to the Ramblers, "one of Britain's best known and toughest" trails.
The Ridgeway	87	140	Berkshire Downs, Southern England	Overton Hill, near Avebury, Wiltshire	Ivinghoe Beacon, Buckinghamshire	Ancient trackway on a chalk ridge described as Britain's oldest road.
South Downs Way	100	161	South Downs in Southern England	Winchester, Hampshire	Eastbourne, East Sussex	Within the South Downs National Park.
South West Coast Path (South West Way)	630	1,014	England: Somerset, Devon, Cornwall & Dorset	Minehead, Somerset	Poole Harbour, Dorset	Originated as a route for the Coastguard to walk from lighthouse to lighthouse patrolling for smugglers.
Thames Path	184	296	Southern England	Kemble, Gloucestershire	Thames Barrier, Charlton	Follows the River Thames from its source to the Thames Barrier in London.
Yorkshire Wolds Way	79	127	Yorkshire, England	Hessle, East Riding of Yorkshire	Filey, North Yorkshire	Runs around the Yorkshire Wolds.

^{*} When complete in around 2026
^{†} Treated as one path by National Trails

== Scotland: Great Trails ==
Scotland's Great Trails are long-distance "people-powered" trails (predominantly hiking trails but including cycling, horse-riding and canoe routes) in Scotland. NatureScot maintains the official list of Scotland's Great Trails and is the custodian of the brand, but responsibility for creating and maintaining each route lies with each local authority through which a route passes, although Scottish Natural Heritage provides some of the finance and publicity. There are 29 routes, offering 1,900 miles (3,000 km) of trails in total.

Each of the routes is clearly waymarked with a dedicated symbol, and run largely off-road. They range in length from 24 to 214 miles (40 to 340 km), and are intended to be tackled over several days, either as a combination of day trips or as an end-to-end expedition. They are primarily intended for walkers, but may have sections suitable for cyclists and horse-riders. One of the trails, the Great Glen Canoe Trail, is designed for canoeists and kayakers.

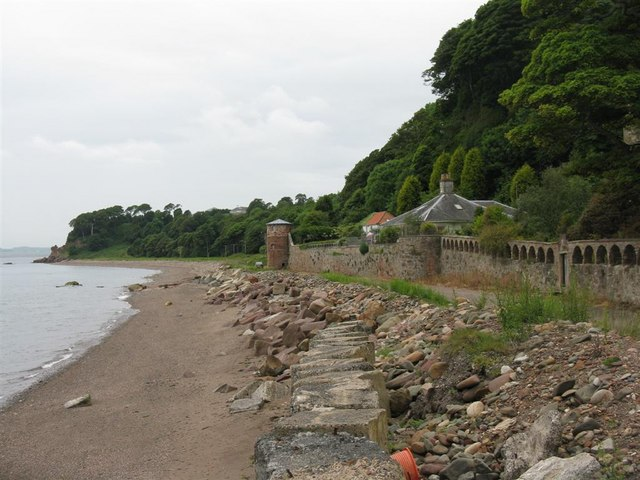
Fife Coastal Path at West Wemyss

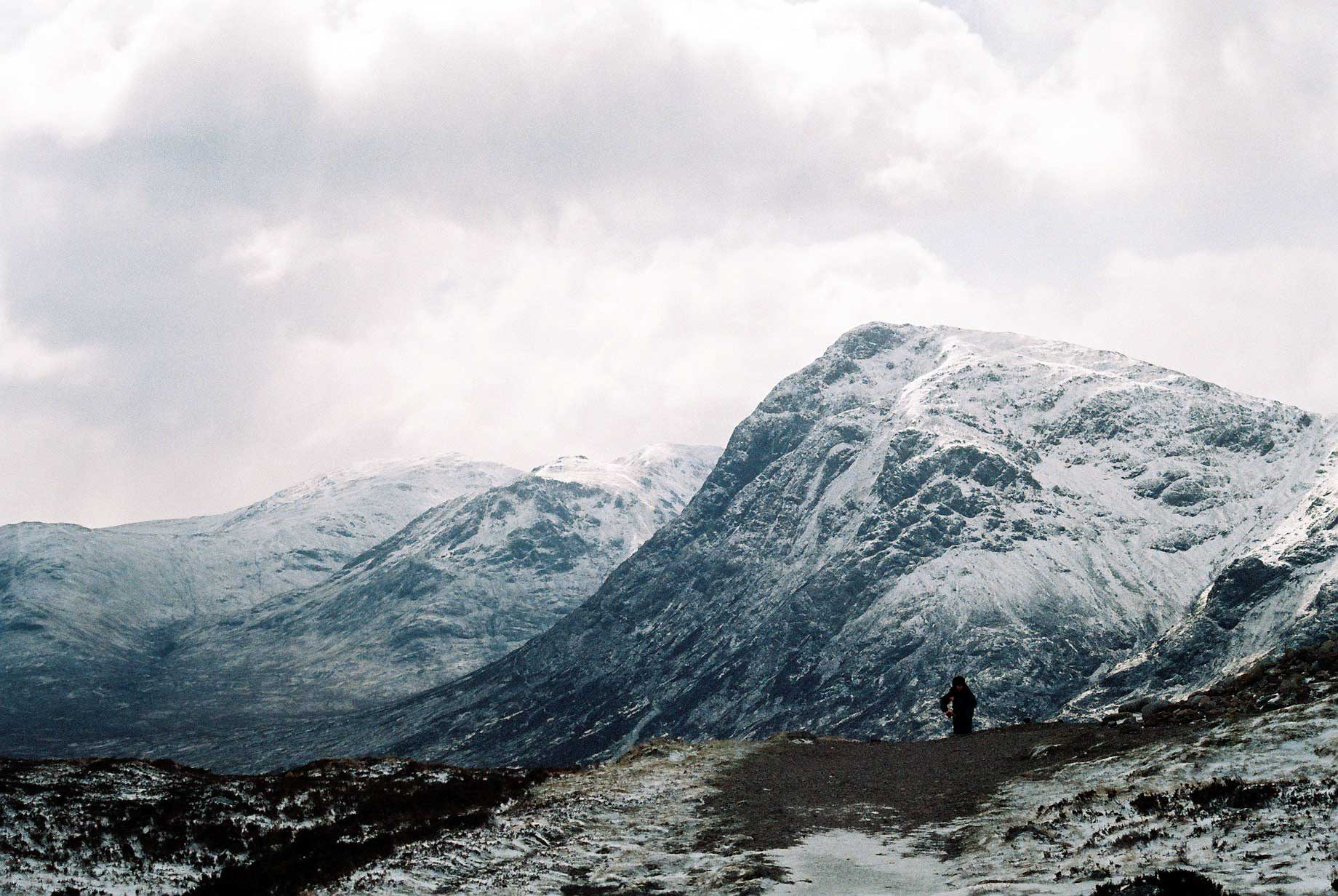
The Devil's Staircase on the West Highland Way

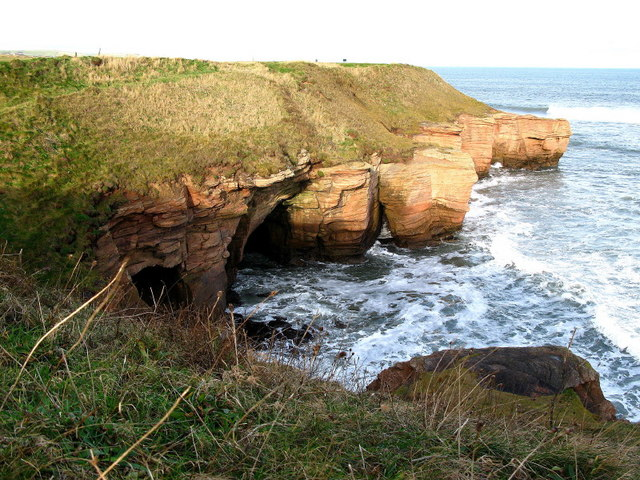
Cliffs from the Berwickshire Coastal Path

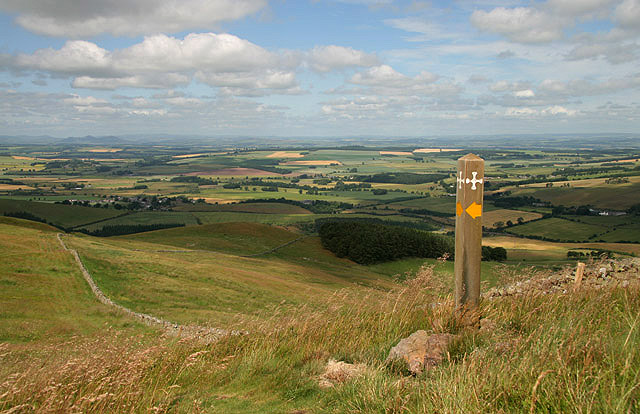
A St Cuthbert's Way marker post at the edge of the square between Grubbit Law and Wideopen Hill

Name	Length		Region	Endpoint one	Endpoint two	Description
Name	mi	km	Region	Endpoint one	Endpoint two	Description
Annandale Way	55	89	Solway Coast, Dumfries and Galloway	Moffat	Annan	Follows the valley of the River Annan from its source in the Moffat Hills to the sea in the Solway Firth.
Arran Coastal Way	66	106	Isle of Arran	N/A	N/A	Circular route around the coastline of the Isle of Arran.
Ayrshire Coastal Path	100	161	Ayrshire	Glenapp, Ballantrae	Skelmorlie, North Ayrshire	Runs alongside the coast and forms part of the International Appalachian Trail.
Berwickshire Coastal Path	28	45	Scottish Borders and Northern England	Cockburnspath, Scottish Borders	Berwick-upon-Tweed, Northumberland	Coastal path spanning the Anglo-Scottish border.
Borders Abbeys Way	68	109	Scottish Borders	N/A	N/A	Circular route in the Borders passing through the ruins of many abbeys: Kelso – Jedburgh – Hawick – Selkirk – Melrose.
Cateran Trail	64	103	Perth and Kinross and Angus	Blairgowrie and Rattray	N/A	Circular route covering many conditions such as farmland, mountains and forest: Blairgowrie – Kirkmichael – Spittal of Glenshee – Alyth.
Clyde Walkway	40	64	South Lanarkshire	Glasgow	New Lanark	Runs close to the River Clyde for most of its length.
Cowal Way	57	92	Cowal Peninsula, Argyll and Bute	Portavadie	Inveruglas on Loch Lomond	Connects with the West Highland Way.
Cross Borders Drove Road	52	84	Edinburgh and the Scottish Borders	Little Vantage, near Edinburgh	Hawick	One of the newest trails based on existing routes.
Dava Way	24	39	Moray	Grantown-on-Spey	Forres	Follows the route of the former Highland Railway which closed in 1965.
Fife Coastal Path	117	188	Fife	Kincardine	Newburgh	When opened it originally ran from North Queensferry to Tayport, but was later extended.
Formartine and Buchan Way	53	85	Aberdeenshire	Dyce, near Aberdeen	Fraserburgh and Peterhead	Follows the track of the former railway line the Formartine and Buchan Railway which closed in 1970. The path branches into two sections at Maud.
Forth and Clyde Canal Pathway	66	106	Central Belt	Bowling, West Dunbartonshire	Fountainbridge, Edinburgh	Runs between the Firth of Forth and the Firth of Clyde.
Great Glen Canoe Trail	60	97	Scottish Highlands	Banavie, near Fort William	Clachnaharry, near Inverness	Coast-to-coast canoe trail on Caledonian canal and lochs.
Great Glen Way	79	127	Scottish Highlands	Fort William	Inverness	Follows the Great Glen.
Great Trossachs Path	28	45	Trossachs	Callander, Stirling	Inversnaid on the bank of Loch Lomond	In the Loch Lomond and The Trossachs National Park.
John Muir Way	134	216	Central Belt	Helensburgh, Argyll and Bute	Dunbar, East Lothian	Named in honour of the Scottish conservationist John Muir, who was born in Dunbar in 1838 and became a founder of the United States National Park Service.
Kintyre Way	100	161	Argyll and Bute, Argyllshire	Tarbert	Machrihanish	On the Kintyre peninsula.
Moray Coast Trail	50	80	Moray	Forres	Cullen	Part of the North Sea Trail.
Mull of Galloway Trail	37	60	Dumfries and Galloway and South Ayrshire	Mull of Galloway	Glenapp, Ballantrae	Created and maintained by the Rotary Club of Stranraer.
River Ayr Way	44	71	Southern Scotland	Glenbuck, East Ayrshire	Ayr, South Ayrshire	Mostly follows the River Ayr.
Rob Roy Way	92	148	Perthshire and Stirlingshire	Drymen, Stirling	Pitlochry, Perth and Kinross	Takes its name from Rob Roy MacGregor, a Scottish folk hero and outlaw of the early 18th century.
Romans and Reivers Route	52	84	Southern Uplands	Ae	Hawick	Mostly follows former Roman roads.
St Cuthbert's Way	62	100	Scottish Borders and Northern England	Melrose, Scottish Borders	Lindisfarne, Northumberland	Named after Cuthbert, a 7th-century saint, a native of the Borders who spent his life in the service of the church.
Southern Upland Way	214	344	Southern Uplands	Portpatrick	Cockburnspath, Berwickshire	Coast-to-coast walk generally from west to east.
Speyside Way	80	129	Northern Scotland	Aviemore	Buckie, Moray	Follows the River Spey through some of Banffshire, Morayshire and Inverness-shire.
Three Lochs Way	34	55	Highland Boundary Fault to the Southern Highlands	Balloch, West Dunbartonshire	Inveruglas, Argyll and Bute	For much of the way it passes through the Loch Lomond and The Trossachs National Park.
West Highland Way	96	154	Scottish Lowlands to the Scottish Highlands	Milngavie, near Glasgow	Fort William, Highlands	Scotland's first and most popular long-distance walking route.
West Island Way	30	48	Isle of Bute	Kilchattan Bay	Port Bannatyne	The first waymarked long-distance route on a Scottish island.

== Other UK long-distance paths ==
Those included here meet the definition of a long-distance path as being around 50 km (31 miles) or more, particularly that they will take more than one day's walking to complete. Some shorter paths linking between major walks (e.g. Maelor Way) are also included.

=== Southern England ===
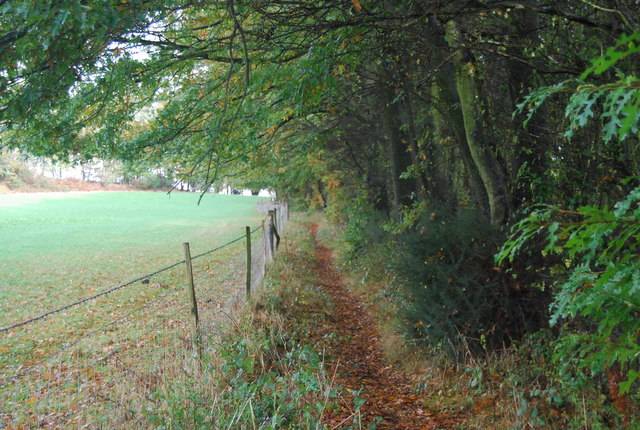
The 1066 Country Walk near Battle

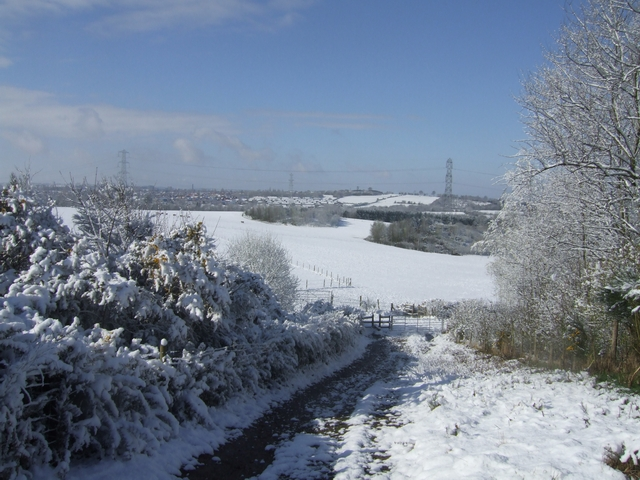
Monarch's Way looking back at the outskirts of Wolverhampton

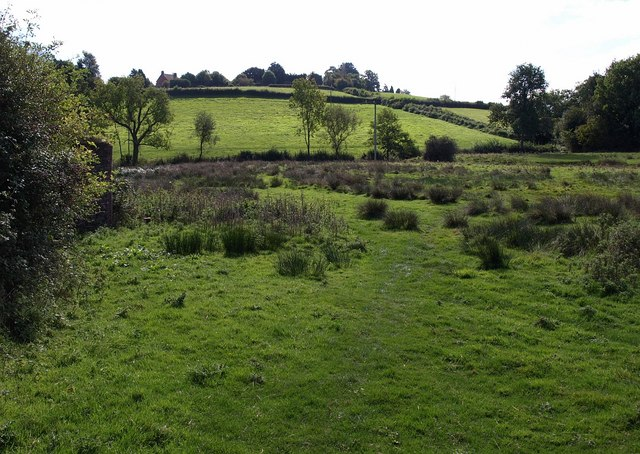
Meadows on the West Deane Way

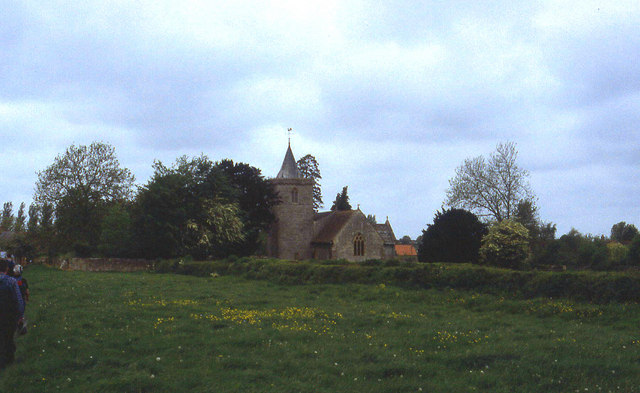
Church of All Saints, West Camel, viewed from the Leland Trail

Name	Length		Region	Endpoint one	Endpoint two	Description
Name	mi	km	Region	Endpoint one	Endpoint two	Description
1066 Country Walk	31	50	East Sussex	Pevensey Castle near Pevensey	Rye	Commemorates the year 1066 and the Battle of Hastings.
Avon Valley Path	34	55	Wiltshire, Hampshire and Dorset	Christchurch	Salisbury	Takes its name from the River Avon and passes through the western edge of the New Forest.
Basingstoke Canal Towpath Trail	33	53	Hampshire and Surrey	Penny Bridge, Up Nately, Basingstoke	Woodham	Follows the path of the 200-year-old Basingstoke Canal.
Blackwater Valley Path	23	37	Berkshire, Hampshire and Surrey	Rowhill Nature Reserve, Aldershot	Swallowfield	Follows the path of the Blackwater.
Bournemouth Coast Path	20	32	Dorset and Hampshire	Sandbanks	Milford on Sea	Coastal path connecting the South West Coast Path (via the Sandbanks Ferry) to the Solent Way.
Capital Ring	75	121	London	N/A	N/A	Circular route through inner London, crossing the Thames at Richmond and Woolwich.
Celtic Way	725	1,167	Wales and Southwest England	Strumble Head, Pembrokeshire	St Michael's Mount, Cornwall	Visits more than 100 pre-historic sites including Stonehenge.
Channel to Channel Path	50	80	South West Peninsula	Seaton, Devon	Watchet, Somerset	Connects the English Channel with the Bristol Channel.
Chiltern Way	134	216	Bedfordshire, Buckinghamshire, Hertfordshire, Luton and Oxfordshire	Hemel Hempstead railway station	N/A	Circular route, originally a 125-mile-long (201 km) Millennium Project.
Coleridge Way	51	82	Somerset and Devon	Nether Stowey	Lynmouth	Starts in the Quantock Hills later moving on to the Brendon Hills, within Exmoor National Park.
Dartmoor Way	95	153	Dartmoor	N/A	N/A	In the Dartmoor National Park in southern Devon.
Devonshire Heartland Way	43	69	Devon	Okehampton	Stoke Canon, Exeter	West-to-east across Devon, starting in Dartmoor near the Exe Valley.
Downs Link	37	60	Surrey and West Sussex	St. Martha's Hill near Guildford	Shoreham-by-Sea	Heads from the North Downs Way onto the South Downs Way at Steyning.
East Devon Way	38	61	South West England	Exmouth, East Devon	Lyme Regis, West Dorset	Runs inland but links with the South West Coast Path at both ends.
Essex Way	81	130	Essex	Epping	Harwich	Crosses Dedham Vale and Constable country to finish at the Stour estuary.
Exe Valley Way	45	72	Devon and Somerset	River Exe estuary	Exford in Exmoor National Park	Follows the valley of the River Exe from its source to the coast.
Gordano Round	27	43	North Somerset	Roath Road, Portishead	N/A	Figure of eight around the Gordano Valley via Clevedon and Abbots Leigh.
Great Stones Way	36	58	Wiltshire	Coate Water Country Park, Swindon	Salisbury Cathedral	From Barbury Castle to Old Sarum with optional detours to Avebury and Stonehenge.
Greater Ridgeway	362	583	South and Central England	Lyme Regis, Dorset on the English Channel	Hunstanton on The Wash	Follows the Wessex Ridgeway, The Ridgeway National Trail, the Icknield Way Path and the Peddars Way National Trail.
Greensand Way	108	174	Home counties	Haslemere, Surrey	Hamstreet, Kent	Follows the Greensand Ridge along the Surrey Hills and Chart Hills.
Hampshire Millennium Pilgrims Trail	29	47	Hampshire	Winchester	Portsmouth	Part of the historical Pilgrims' Trail, a 155-mile long-distance footpath connecting Winchester Cathedral to Mont Saint-Michel in Normandy.
Harcamlow Way	141	227	Essex, Hertfordshire and Cambridgeshire	Harlow	Cambridge	A figure-of-eight from Harlow to Cambridge and back again, hence its portmanteau name.
Hardy Way	220	354	West Country	Hardy's Cottage, Higher Bockhampton	Stinsford, Dorset	Almost circular, the endpoints being a mile apart, and named after the writer Thomas Hardy.
High Weald Landscape Trail	90	145	West Sussex, East Sussex, Kent	Horsham	Rye	Passes through the landscapes of the High Weald Area of Outstanding Natural Beauty.
Isle of Wight Coastal Path	70	113	Isle of Wight	Ryde	N/A	Circular coastal route mainly following public footpaths.
Itchen Way	32	51	Hampshire	Hinton Ampner near Alresford	Sholing	Follows the River Itchen from its source.
Jubilee Trail	88	142	Dorset	Forde Abbey	Bokerley Dyke	Created to celebrate The Ramblers' Association's Diamond Jubilee and passes through many historical sites.
King's Way	45	72	Hampshire	Winchester	Portchester	Created by the Ramblers' Association as a memorial to the late Allan King (who formed many local groups in Hampshire).
Land's End Trail	303	488	South West Peninsula	Land's End, Cornwall	Avebury, Wiltshire	Links Land's End with many of England's central long-distance trails.
Leland Trail	28	45	Somerset	King Alfred's Tower, Brewham	Ham Hill	Named after the antiquary and poet John Leland.
Liberty Trail	28	45	Somerset and Dorset	Ham Hill	Lyme Regis	Based on the route rebels travelled to join the Monmouth Rebellion.
Limestone Link	36	58	South West England	Mendip Hills, Somerset	Cold Aston, Gloucestershire	Connects with the Mendip Way and the Cotswold Way.
London Outer Orbital Path (The LOOP)	150	241	London	Erith	Rainham	Circular route around the edge of Outer London.
Mendip Way	50	80	Somerset	Uphill near Weston-super-Mare	Frome	On the Mendip Hills, giving views over the Somerset Levels.
Monarch's Way	615	990	Southern England	Worcester	Shoreham-by-Sea, West Sussex	Approximates the escape route taken by King Charles II in 1651 after being defeated in the Battle of Worcester.
New Lipchis Way	40	64	Hampshire and West Sussex	Liphook	West Wittering	Passes through Midhurst and Chichester crossing the Western Weald and South Downs.
Orange Way	350	563	Devon, Dorset, Hampshire, Berkshire and Buckinghamshire	Brixham, Devon	London	Follows the march in 1688 of Prince William of Orange and his army from Brixham to London.
Oxford Canal Walk	82	132	Oxfordshire, Warwickshire and the West Midlands	Oxford	Coventry	Follows the towpath of the Oxford Canal.
Oxford Green Belt Way	52	84	Oxfordshire	N/A	N/A	Circular route through the Oxford Green Belt.
Oxfordshire Way	62	100	Oxfordshire and Gloucestershire	Bourton-on-the-Water	Henley-on-Thames	Passes from the Cotswolds to the Chiltern Hills.
Pilgrims' Way	120	193	South Eastern England	Winchester	Shrine of Thomas Becket, Canterbury	Historical route taken by pilgrims to and from the shrine of Thomas Becket. An ancient trail of which perhaps two-thirds is still identifiable, much of it now incorporated into the North Downs Way National Trail.
Quantock Greenway	37	60	Somerset	N/A	N/A	A figure-of-eight centred on Triscombe in the Quantock Hills.
River Parrett Trail	50	80	Dorset & Somerset	Chedington	Bridgwater Bay, Bristol Channel	Follows the River Parrett to the coast.
Royal Military Canal Path	27	43	Kent and East Sussex	Seabrook	Pett Level	Follows the Royal Military Canal and touches the northern edge of Romney Marsh.
Samaritans Way South West	103	166	South West England	Clifton Suspension Bridge	Lynmouth	Opened by the Ramblers and the Samaritans in part to help local farmers. Only the section from Bristol to Goathurst is waymarked.
Sarum Way	32	51	Wiltshire	N/A	N/A	Circular route around the city of Salisbury, only partly waymarked.
Saxon Shore Way	163	262	South East England	Gravesend, Kent	Hastings, East Sussex,	Traces the shoreline as it was in Roman times and visits many historical sites of the period.
Serpent Trail	64	103	Hampshire, Surrey and West Sussex	Haslemere	Petersfield	Designed to join up many of the heathland areas in the western Weald.
Shipwrights Way	50	80	Hampshire	Alice Holt Forest	Portsmouth	Traces the route that might have been taken by timber from forest to shipyards for the construction of warships.
Solent Way	60	97	Hampshire	Milford on Sea	Emsworth	Follows the coast of the Solent.
South Hams Way	100	161	Devon	Totnes ("gateway" to circular route)	N/A	Follows 50 mi (80 km) of the South West Coast Path and reaches 1,281 ft (390 m) on Dartmoor
Stour Valley Walk	52	84	Kent	Pegwell Bay	Lenham	Follows the River Stour, through the Low Weald and Kent Downs, from its source to its estuary.
Stour Valley Way	64	103	Dorset and Wiltshire	Stourton with Gasper	Hengistbury Head	Follows the River Stour as it winds through the Dorset countryside.
St. Swithun's Way	34	55	Hampshire and Surrey	Winchester Cathedral	Farnham	Named after Swithun, a 9th-century Bishop of Winchester, and roughly follows a short stretch of the Pilgrims' Way.
Sussex Border Path	138	222	West & East Sussex	Thorney Island	Rye	Follows the Sussex border with Hampshire, Surrey and Kent.
Sussex Ouse Valley Way	42	68	West & East Sussex	Lower Beeding	Seaford	Follows the River Ouse from its source to the English Channel.
Tamara Coast to Coast Way	87	140	Cornwall	Cremyll	Morwenstow	Mostly follows the River Tamar and the boundary between Cornwall and Devon.
Tarka Trail	180	290	Devon	Barnstaple	N/A	Two separate circular routes based on the fictional route taken by Tarka the Otter in the book of the same name.
Test Way	49	79	Berkshire and Hampshire	Walbury Hill	Totton and Eling	Passes through the towns of Romsey and Totton and starts in the Test Valley.
Thames Down Link	15	24	London and Surrey	Kingston Bridge	Box Hill Station	Links the Thames Path and the North Downs Way.
Thames Estuary Path	29	47	Essex	Tilbury Town	Leigh-on-Sea	Along the northern side of the estuary of the River Thames
Three Castles Path	60	97	Hampshire and Berkshire	Winchester Castle	Windsor Castle	As well as Winchester Castle and Windsor Castle, passes through Odiham Castle; unwaymarked.
Two Moors Way	102	164	Devon & Somerset	Ivybridge, Dartmoor National Park	Lynmouth, North Devon Coast	Across Dartmoor over exposed moorland.
Vanguard Way	66	106	Surrey, Kent and East Sussex	East Croydon	Newhaven	Connects Central London with the Wandle Trail along the River Wandle from Croydon.
Via Beata	400	644	Cambridgeshire, Carmarthenshire, Herefordshire, Norfolk, Pembrokeshire, Powys, Suffolk, Warwickshire, Worcestershire	Great Yarmouth	St Davids	Offers a pilgrimage route between the coastal extremities of Great Yarmouth and St Davids.
Wayfarers Walk	70	113	Berkshire and Hampshire	Walbury Hill	Emsworth	Approximates an ancient route that might have been used by drovers taking cattle to market.
Wealdway	83	134	Kent and East Sussex	Gravesend	Eastbourne	Connects the Thames Estuary with the English Channel and also traverses the Ashdown Forest.
Wessex Ridgeway	136	219	Wiltshire and Dorset	Marlborough	Lyme Regis	One of the four long-distance footpaths referred to as the Greater Ridgeway.
West Deane Way	45	72	Taunton Deane area of Somerset	Taunton	N/A	Circular walk in the Vale of Taunton Deane.
West Devon Way	36	58	Devon	Okehampton	Radford Castle, Hooe Lake, Plymouth	Links with the Tamar Valley Discovery Trail and the Two Castles Trail to form the 'West Devon Triangle', a 90-mile circuit.
Wey South Path	32	51	Surrey and West Sussex	Guildford	Houghton Bridge	Follows the banks of the River Wey and the Wey and Arun Canal.

=== Midlands and East Anglia ===
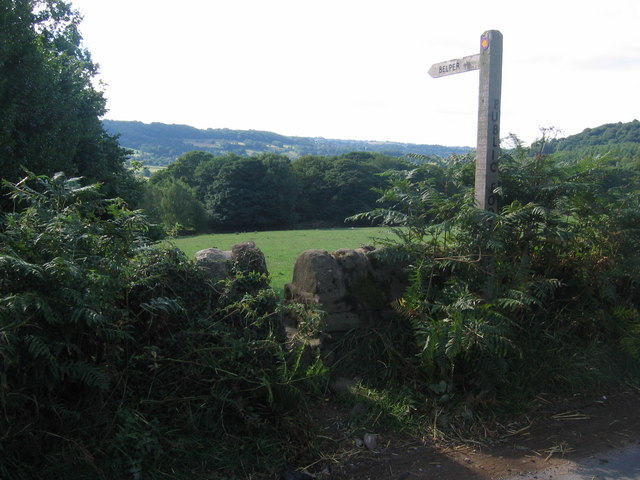
The Derwent Valley Heritage Way along Whitewells Road

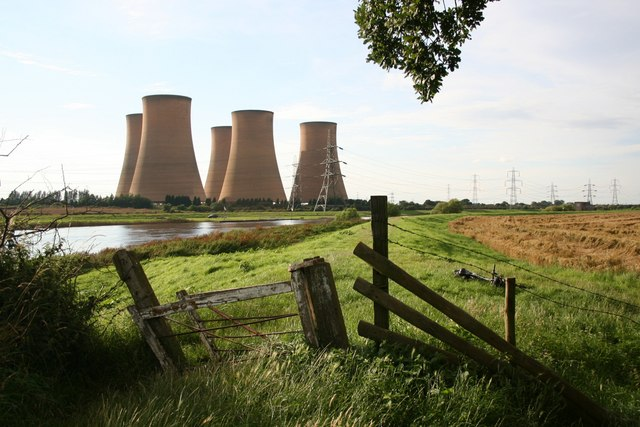
A view of the former High Marnham power station on the Trent Valley Way

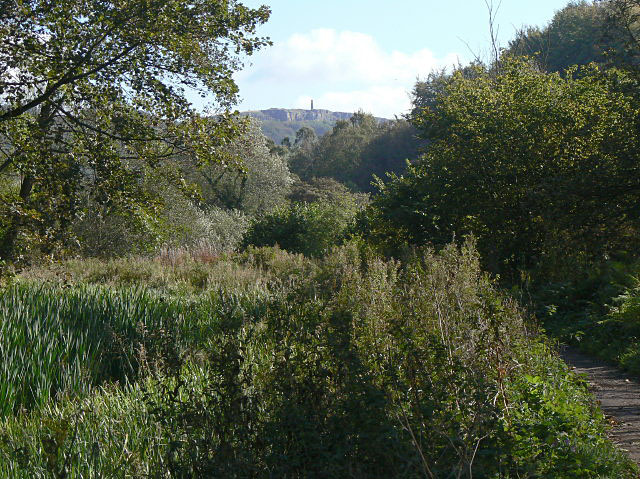
The Derwent Valley Heritage Way next to the Cromford Canal

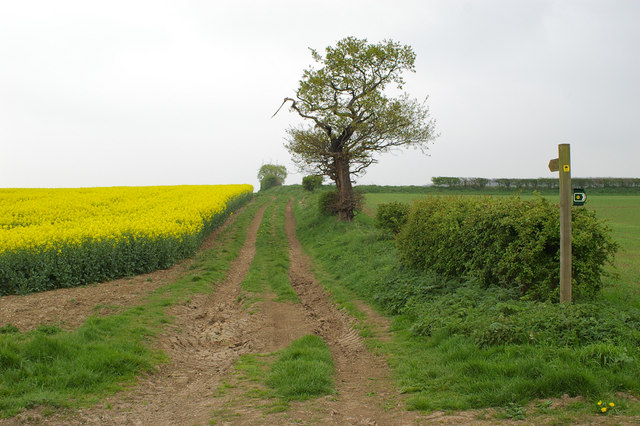
A field of rapeseed on the Viking Way

Name	Length		Region	Endpoint one	Endpoint two	Description
Name	mi	km	Region	Endpoint one	Endpoint two	Description
Angles Way	92	148	Norfolk and Suffolk	Great Yarmouth	Barnhamcross Common, Thetford	Largely follows the county border; originally 15 miles shorter and ending in Knettishall Heath.
Bishop Bennet Way	34	55	Southwest Cheshire	Beeston	Wirswall	Named after William Bennet who carried out detailed surveys of Roman roads in the area.
Boudica's Way	36	58	East Anglia	Diss railway station, Diss	Norwich railway station, Norwich	Parallel to the old Roman Pye Road, now the A140 road.
Centenary Way	99	159	Warwickshire	Kingsbury Water Park	Lower Quinton	Devised to celebrate 100 years of Warwickshire County Council.
Cheshire Ring	97	156	Cheshire and Greater Manchester	N/A	N/A	Circular walk alongside six canals, via Dukinfield and Marple.
Coventry Way	40	64	Coventry	Meriden, West Midlands	N/A	Circular route around the city of Coventry in West Midlands and Warwickshire.
Dane Valley Way	48	77	Derbyshire, Staffordshire, Cheshire	Buxton, Derbyshire	Northwich, Cheshire	Along or near the course of the River Dane, past its source at Dane Head in Derbyshire and down to its end at its confluence with the River Weaver in Cheshire
D'Arcy Dalton Way	66	106	Gloucestershire, Oxfordshire, Warwickshire	Wormleighton Reservoir, Warwickshire	Wayland's Smithy Long Barrow	Links four long-distance footpaths: Oxford Canal Walk, Thames Path, The Ridgeway and Oxfordshire Way. Follows the western boundary of Oxfordshire in unspoilt countryside.
Derwent Valley Heritage Way	55	89	Derbyshire	Ladybower Reservoir, north of Bamford	Shardlow	Runs around the Derbyshire Dales through Chatsworth, Derbyshire and the Derwent Valley Mills World Heritage Site.
Fen Rivers Way	50	80	Eastern England	Cambridge	King's Lynn, Norfolk	Runs alongside the River Cam and on to the River Great Ouse.
Geopark Way	109	175	West Midlands and South West England	Bridgnorth Castle	Gloucester Cathedral	Links a series of geologically and historically important sites.
Gloucestershire Way	100	161	Gloucestershire	Tutshill	Tewkesbury	Routes through the Forest of Dean, Cotswolds and the Severn Plain.
Gritstone Trail	35	56	Cheshire East and Staffordshire	Disley railway station, Disley	Mow Cop, Kidsgrove	Mostly through the western section of the Peak District National Park.
Heart of England Way	100	161	Midlands	Milford, Staffordshire	Bourton-on-the-Water, Gloucestershire	Links the Cannock Chase Area of Outstanding Natural Beauty with the Cotswolds Area of Outstanding Natural Beauty; officially recognised by the four councils it passes through.
Herefordshire Trail	154	248	Herefordshire	Ledbury, Herefordshire	N/A	Circular route linking the market towns of Leominster, Bromyard, Ledbury, Ross-on-Wye and Kington. Waymarks planned but not yet in place.
Hereward Way	110	177	East Anglia	Oakham	East Harling	Through Thetford Forest linking the Viking Way and the Peddars Way long-distance footpaths. The Stamford to Peterborough section is not fully waymarked, but walkers travelling between those two places can follow the waymarked Torpel Way.
Hertfordshire Way	194	312	Hertfordshire	N/A	N/A	Circular walk in open countryside, although some parts are within 20 miles of London. Passes through the county town of Hertford and the towns of Royston and Bishop's Stortford.
Icknield Way Path	110	177	Buckinghamshire, Cambridgeshire, Norfolk	Ivinghoe Beacon	Knettishall Heath	Prehistoric pathways passing through many sites of archaeological remains.
Jack Mytton Way	93	150	Shropshire	Bridgnorth	Much Wenlock	Runs through the Shropshire Hills and the Clee Hills including parts of Wenlock Edge.
Jurassic Way	88	142	The Midlands	Banbury, Oxfordshire	Stamford, Lincolnshire	Mostly follows a Jurassic limestone ridge, from where its name derives.
Lea Valley Walk	50	80	South East England	Leagrave, Bedfordshire	Limehouse Basin, Limehouse, East London	Follows the River Lea from its source and along the Lee Navigation to the East India Docks in London.
Limestone Way	50	80	Derbyshire, Staffordshire	Castleton	Rocester	Through the limestone Derbyshire Dales finishing in Dove Valley.
Leicestershire Round	102	164	Leicestershire, Rutland	Bradgate Park	Circular	Encircles Leicester, including Foxton Locks, Bosworth Battlefield and Burrough Hill.
Limey Way	40	64	Derbyshire	Castleton	Dovedale	In the White Peak area in limestone countryside visiting twenty dales.
Maelor Way	24	39	Shropshire, Cheshire and into Wrexham, Wales	Grindley Brook	Bronygarth	Links six long-distance footpaths, the Offa's Dyke Path National Trail, while travelling through meadows and woodland.
Mercian Way	230	370	The Midlands and Northern England	Salisbury	Chester	Part of National Cycle Route 4, but also well used by walkers.
Midshires Way	230	370	South-East England, the Midlands and Northern England	Chiltern Hills near Bledlow, Buckinghamshire	Stockport, Greater Manchester	Footpath and bridleway linking the Ridgeway with the Pennine Way across Middle England.
Mortimer Trail	30	48	Shropshire and Herefordshire	Ludlow	Kington	Runs through the Welsh Marches on the English side of the Anglo-Welsh border and named after the Mortimer family of ruling Marcher Lords.
Nar Valley Way	34	55	Norfolk	King's Lynn	Gressenhall	Through the watershed of the River Nar.
Nene Way	110	177	Northamptonshire, Cambridgeshire and Lincolnshire	Badby	Lincolnshire	Follows the course of the River Nene.
New River Path	28	45	Hertfordshire and North London	New Gauge, Hertford	New River Head, Islington	Follows the course of the New River aqueduct.
North Worcestershire Path	35	56	Worcestershire	Kinver	Major's Green	Links four country parks in the north-east area of the historic county.
Ouse Valley Way	150	241	The Midlands and the East of England	Syresham, Northamptonshire	The Wash	Follows the River Great Ouse from its source to the sea.
Pathfinder March	46	74	Cambridgeshire	N/A	N/A	Annual circular route around former RAF Pathfinder airfields in Cambridgeshire, held on the Saturday closest to Midsummers Day.
Peak District Boundary Walk	190	306	Derbyshire, Cheshire, Yorkshire, Staffordshire	Buxton Market Place	Buxton Market Place	A circular walking trail, broadly following the boundary of the Peak District national park. The route was developed by the Friends of the Peak District (a branch of the Campaign to Protect Rural England).
Robin Hood Way	104	167	The Midlands	Nottingham Castle	Edwinstowe, Sherwood Forest	Commemorates the folklore of Robin Hood.
Sabrina Way	203	327	The Midlands and Central England	Hartington, Derbyshire	Great Barrington, Gloucestershire	Bridleway providing a link between the Ridgeway and the Pennine Bridleway.
Saffron Trail	70	113	Essex	Southend-on-Sea	Saffron Walden	Traverses the county from the south-east to the north-west.
Sandlings Walk	60	97	Suffolk	Ipswich	Southwold	Has eleven sculptures along the route and passes through the Suffolk Coast and Heaths Area of Outstanding Natural Beauty.
Sandstone Trail	32	51	Cheshire and Shropshire	Frodsham	Whitchurch	Mostly follows the Mid Cheshire Ridge but in places, also passes through the Cheshire Plain.
Severn Way	210	338	Mid Wales and Western England	Plynlimon, the Cambrian Mountains	Bristol	Follows the course of the River Severn from its source to the Severn Estuary.
Shakespeare's Way	146	235	Southern England	Stratford-Upon-Avon	Globe Theatre on the South Bank, London	Replicates the route William Shakespeare would take from his home and playhouse.
Sheffield Country Walk	53	85	City of Sheffield	Eckington	N/A	Circular walk around the city boundary.
Shropshire Way	202	325	Shropshire	Shrewsbury	Whitchurch	Re-waymarked in 2017 to 2019, the Main Route South (122 miles) and Main Route North (70 miles) are circulars from Shrewsbury, with a further 10-mile northern spur to Whitchurch.
South Cheshire Way	32	51	Cheshire, Shropshire and Staffordshire	Grindley Brook	Mow Cop	Connects with several other long-distance paths, including the Maelor Way, the Staffordshire Way and the Sandstone and Gritstone Trails.
Staffordshire Way	92	148	Staffordshire	Mow Cop	Kinver Edge	Opened in three stages by Staffordshire County Council between 1977 and 1983.
Stour Valley Path	60	97	East Anglia	Newmarket	Cattawade, Manningtree	Follows the catchment area of the River Stour and the majority of the route forms part of European Path E2.
St Edmund Way	79	127	Essex, Suffolk and Norfolk	Manningtree	Brandon	Follows Stour Valley Path; not waymarked but on OS mapping.
St. Kenelm's Trail	95	153	Gloucestershire and Worcestershire	Clent Hills	Winchcombe	Originally devised by John Price, linking the two places most commonly associated with the legend of St Kenelm.
St Peter's Way	45	72	Essex	Chipping Ongar	Chapel of St Peter-on-the-Wall, Bradwell-on-Sea	Runs across the agricultural land of Essex passing Hanningfield Reservoir and the inlets of the Blackwater Estuary going on to reach the coast.
Suffolk Coast Path	50	80	Suffolk	Felixstowe	Lowestoft	Follows the Heritage coast.
Swan's Way	65	105	Northamptonshire, Buckinghamshire and Oxfordshire	Salcey Forest, Milton Keynes	Goring-on-Thames	Bridleway forming the Buckinghamshire section of the Midshires Way.
Tas Valley Way	25	40	Norfolk	Cringleford	Attleborough	Follows the course of the River Tas to the source near New Buckenham.
Telford T50	50	80	Telford	Telford Town Park	n/a	A waymarked 50-mile route created in 2018 to celebrate Telford's 50th birthday. Many rural sections.
Three Forests Way	60	97	Essex and Hertfordshire	Harlow	N/A	Circular route through Epping, Hainault and Hatfield forests on the borders of Essex and Greater London.
Three Shires Way	49	79	East Anglia	Grafham Water, Cambridgeshire	Tathall End, Milton Keynes	Bridleway through rural landscape and ancient woodland. It originally ended in Salcey Forest but the Grafham Water Circular Ride, of 12.4 miles around the reservoir, has now been added to the route.
Trent Valley Way	116	187	Derbyshire, Nottinghamshire and Lincolnshire	Trent Lock	Alkborough	Follows the River Trent; originally created in 1998.
Viking Way	147	237	Lincolnshire and Rutland	Barton-upon-Humber	Oakham	Links other major routes including the Macmillan Way and the Yorkshire Wolds Way; most is designated as part of the European E2 footpath.
Way for the Millennium	41	66	Staffordshire	Newport, Shropshire	Burton upon Trent	East–west route across Staffordshire, designed for easy walking.
Weavers' Way	61	98	Norfolk	Cromer	Great Yarmouth	Can be combined with the Peddars Way to make a circuit around Norfolk; links with the North Norfolk Coastal Path and the Angles Way.
Wherryman's Way	35	56	Norfolk	Norwich	Great Yarmouth	Follows the River Yare for the most part.
Wild Edric's Way	49	79	Shropshire	Church Stretton	Ludlow	Shares much of its route with the Shropshire Way.
Worcestershire Way	31	50	Worcestershire	Bewdley	Malvern	When created it was partly into Herefordshire, being 48 miles long (77 km).
Wychavon Way	40	64	Worcestershire and Gloucestershire	Droitwich Spa	Winchcombe	Originally opened in 1977 to commemorate the Silver Jubilee of Elizabeth II.
Wychwood Way	37	60	Oxfordshire	Market Street, Woodstock	N/A	Circular walk around the heart of the ancient royal forest of Wychwood.
Wysis Way	55	89	Gloucestershire and Monmouthshire	Monmouth	Kemble station	Runs from the Offa's Dyke Path National Trail at Monmouth to the Thames Path National Trail at Kemble.

=== Northern England ===
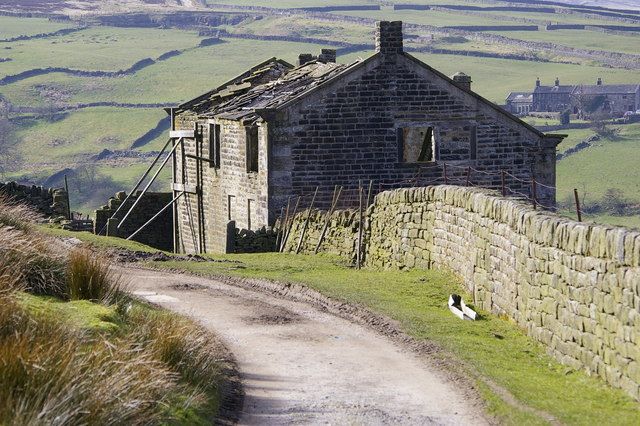
Middle Intake Farm alongside the Brontë Way

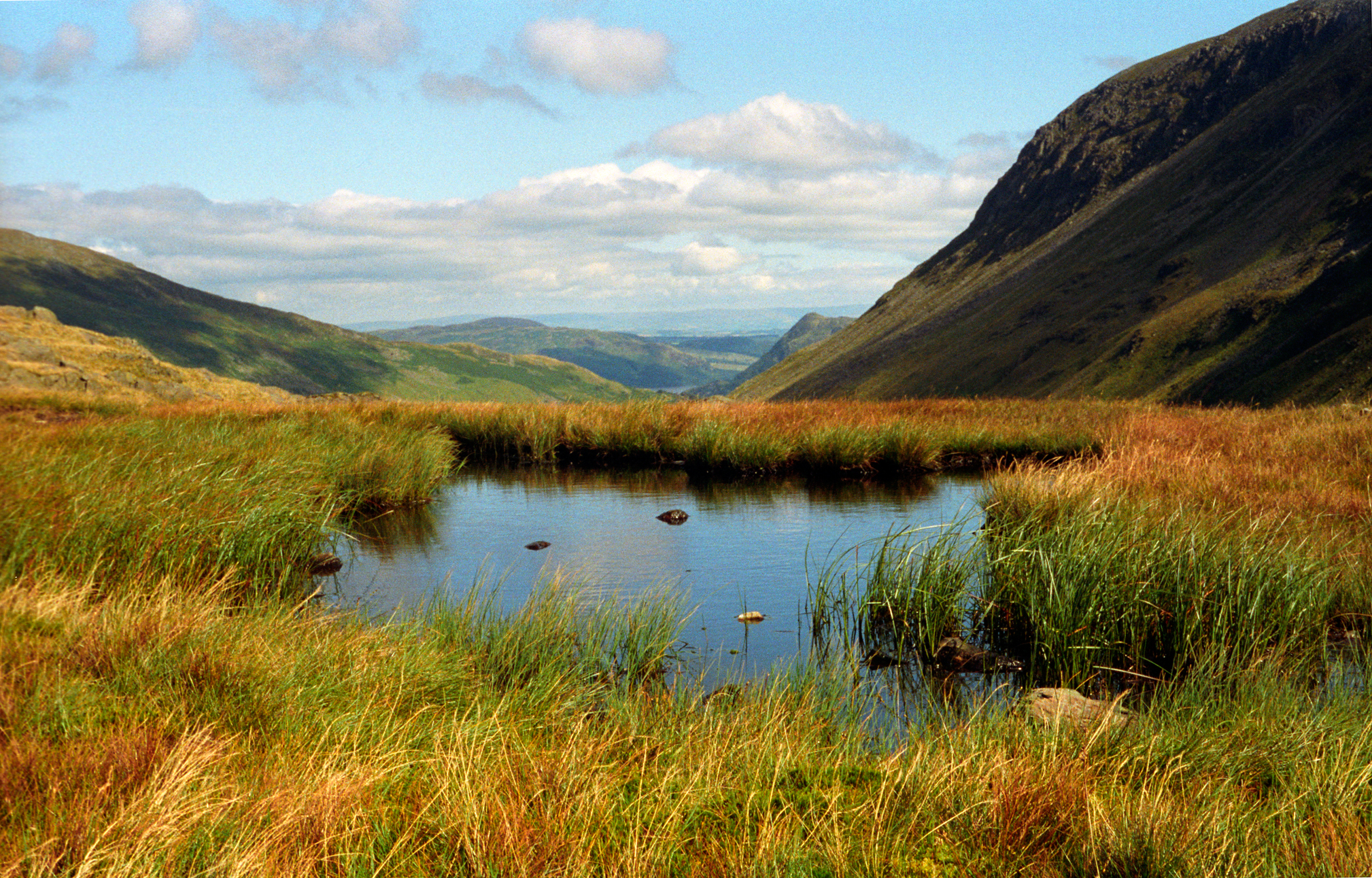
A bog on the Coast to Coast Walk next to St Sunday Crag

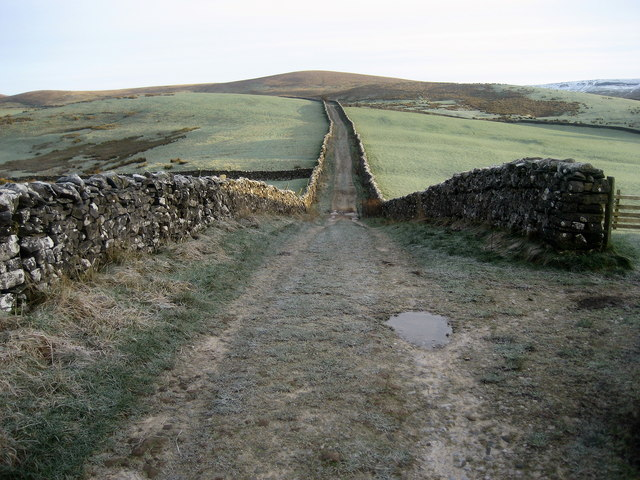
Harber Scar Lane which carries the Ribble Way northwards out of Horton-in-Ribblesdale

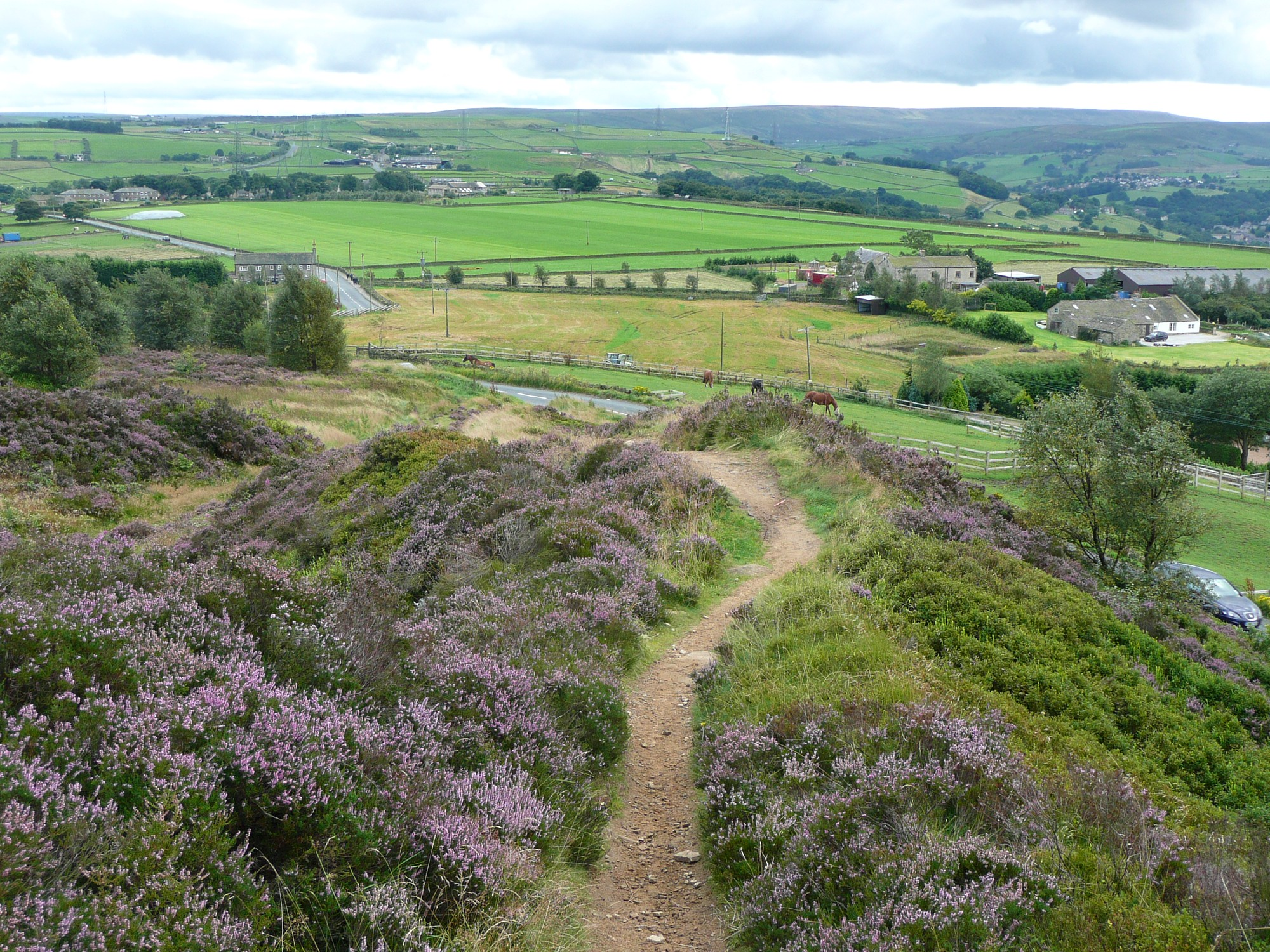
The Calderdale Way at the southern end of Norland Moor

Name	Length		Region	Endpoint one	Endpoint two	Description
Name	mi	km	Region	Endpoint one	Endpoint two	Description
Abbeys Amble	104	167	North Yorkshire	Ripon	N/A	Circular route linking three abbeys: Fountains Abbey, Bolton Abbey and Jervaulx Abbey.
Abbott's Hike	107	172	Cumbria, North Yorkshire and West Yorkshire	Ilkley	Pooley Bridge	Classed as a challenging walk on upland and moorland.
Ainsty Bounds Walk	44	71	North and West Yorkshire	Tadcaster	N/A	Circular route following the boundaries of the ancient wapentake of The Ainsty.
Brontë Way	43	69	West Yorkshire and Lancashire	Birstall	Padiham	Links places that have strong associations with the writings of the Brontë family.
Bullock Smithy Hike	56	90	Central England, Northern England and the Peak District	Hazel Grove, Greater Manchester	N/A	Circular challenge walk with over 7,000 feet (2,100 m) of accent.
Bullock Smithy Hike	40	64	Lancashire	N/A	N/A	Circular route around Burnley, covering a range of terrain from canal towpaths to open moorland.
Calderdale Way	50	80	Calderdale, West Yorkshire	Greetland	N/A	Circular route devised in the 1970s.
Centenary Way	83	134	Yorkshire	York	Filey Brigg	Runs across the Howardian Hills and Yorkshire Wolds via Castle Howard and Wharram Percy.
Cistercian Way	24	39	Cumbria	Grange-over-Sands	Roa Island	Partially waymarked, no longer recognised by Ordnance Survey or the Cumbria County Council.
Coast to Coast Walk	192	309	Cumbria and North Yorkshire	St. Bees	Robin Hood's Bay	Passes through three national parks: the Lake District, the Yorkshire Dales and the North York Moors.
Cumbria Coastal Way	185	298	Northern England and the Scottish Borders	Silverdale, Lancashire	Gretna Green, Dumfries and Galloway	Coastal walk established by Cumbria council in the late 1980s.
Cumbria Way	70	113	Cumbria	Ulverston	Carlisle	Passes through Coniston and Keswick.
Dales High Way	90	145	Yorkshire and Cumbria	Saltaire	Appleby-in-Westmorland	Runs roughly parallel to the Settle–Carlisle Railway.
Dales Way	80	129	Yorkshire and Cumbria	Bowness-on-Windermere	Ilkley	Extensions to Leeds, Shipley and Harrogate.
Ebor Way	70	113	Yorkshire	Ilkley	Helmsley	Connects to the Dales Way to the Cleveland Way running through the low-lying vale of York.
Esk Valley Walk	35	56	North Yorkshire	Castleton	Whitby	Loops around the North York Moors and then follows the River Esk to the North Sea.
GM Ringway	200	322	Greater Manchester	N/A	N/A	Circular route around the city-region.
Herriot Way	52	84	Wensleydale and Swaledale, North Yorkshire	N/A	N/A	Circular route through Yorkshire Dales of Wensleydale and Swaledale.
Howardian Way	30	48	North Yorkshire	Coxwold	Kirkham Priory	Travels through the Howardian Hills Area of Outstanding Natural Beauty.
Hyndburn Clog	53	85	Lancashire	Stanhill	N/A	Circular route around Hyndburn.
Irwell Sculpture Trail	30	48	Greater Manchester, Lancashire	Salford Quays	Bacup, Rossendale	The largest public art scheme in England, its route follows the River Irwell.
Isaac's Tea Trail	36	58	Northumberland	Isaac's Well, Allendale	Ninebanks	Circular route passing through Nenthead and Alston in the North Pennines Area of Outstanding Natural Beauty.
Kirklees Way	72	116	Kirklees, West Yorkshire	N/A	N/A	Circular route including the upper Colne Valley, Spen Valley and Holme Valley.
Lady Anne's Way	100	161	Cumbria, North Yorkshire	Skipton	Penrith	Travels through the Yorkshire Dales and the Upper Eden Valley linking the castles of Lady Anne Clifford.
Lake to Lake Walk	166	267	Cumbria, Northumberland	Windermere	Kielder Water	Links England's largest natural lake and largest man-made lake.
Lancashire Coastal Way	66	106	Lancashire	Silverdale	Freckleton	Follows the coast of the county of Lancashire; length quoted as 137 miles by Lancashire County Council.
Leeds Country Way	62	100	Leeds metropolitan district, West Yorkshire	N/A	N/A	Circular route around Leeds.
Lyke Wake Walk	40	64	North York Moors, north-east Yorkshire	Scarth Wood Moor, Osmotherley	Ravenscar	Challenge walk with its own associated Lyke Wake Clubs.
Miller's Way	51	82	Cumbria	Kendal	Carlisle	Celebrates 175 years of Carr's by memorialising the journey of destiny taken by founder JD Carr in 1831.
Nidderdale Way	52	84	Nidderdale, North Yorkshire	Ripley	Pateley Bridge	Long-established circular route near the source of the River Nidd.
Northumberland Coast Path	63	101	Northumberland	Cresswell	Berwick-upon-Tweed	Coastal route, part of the North Sea Trail.
Oldham Way	40	64	Borough of Oldham, Greater Manchester	Dove Stone Reservoir	N/A	Circular route across Pennine moorland linking both ends of Standedge Tunnel.
Peatlands Way	50	80	South Yorkshire	Thorne	N/A	Circular route across Thorne and Hatfield Moors in the Humberhead Levels.
Pendle Way	45	72	Lancashire	Barley	N/A	Circular route in the Southern Pennines incorporating Pendle Hill.
Pennine Journey	247	398	County Durham Cumbria, Northumberland, North Yorkshire	Settle	N/A	Circular route running anti-clockwise up to Hadrian's Wall and back to Settle.
Reiver's Way	150	241	Northumberland	Corbridge	Alnmouth	Through the Northumberland National Park and the Cheviot Hills.
Ribble Way	72	116	Lancashire and Yorkshire	Longton	Ribblehead	Runs between the Lancashire coast and the Yorkshire Dales National Park following the course of the River Ribble.
Rochdale Way	45	72	Rochdale, Greater Manchester	Hollingworth Lake Visitor Centre, Littleborough	N/A	Circular route around the Metropolitan Borough of Rochdale.
Roof of England Walk	187	301	North Pennines	Appleby-in-Westmorland, Cumbria	N/A	Circular route through the North Pennines National Landscape.
Rossendale Way	45	72	Lancashire	Sharneyford	N/A	Circular high-level route, mostly over 1,000 feet (300 m), around the Rossendale Valley.
Six Dales Trail	38	61	North and West Yorkshire	Jubilee Tower, Otley	Market Cross, Middleham	Takes its name from the six Yorkshire Dales it traverses: Wharfedale, Washburndale, Nidderdale, Colsterdale, Coverdale and Wensleydale.
St Bega's Way	36	58	Cumbria	St Bees Priory	St Bega's, Bassenthwaite	Links the Norman priory church of St Mary and St Bega at St Bees, through the Lake District.
St. Cuthbert's Way	62	100	Scottish Borders and Northumberland	Melrose	Lindisfarne	Links Melrose Abbey, where Cuthbert began his religious life, with his burial place on Holy Island.
St Oswald's Way	97	156	Northumberland	Lindisfarne	Heavenfield	Links places associated with St. Oswald, the king of Northumbria in the early 7th century.
Stanza Stones Trail	45	72	West Yorkshire	Marsden	Ilkley	Links six stones engraved with poems by Simon Armitage
Tabular Hills Walk	48	77	North Yorkshire	Helmsley	Scarborough	Links the Cleveland Way between Helmsley and Scarborough at the southern border of the North York Moors
Teesdale Way	100	161	Cumbria and North Yorkshire	Dufton	Warrenby	Follows the River Tees as it passes Cumbrian moorlands to Teesside and the coast.
Trans Pennine Trail	350	563	Lancashire, Greater Manchester, East Yorkshire and Derbyshire	Southport	Hornsea	Runs coast to coast across northern England, forming part of European walking route E8.
Wainwright's Way	126	203	Lancashire, Cumbria	Blackburn	Haystacks	Follows Wainwright's life. Not to be confused with Coast to Coast Walk which is sometimes called "Wainwright Way".
Weardale Way	73	117	County Durham, Tyne and Wear	Sunderland	Wearhead	Follows the River Wear from the sea to the east Pennines.
Welcome Way	36	58	West Yorkshire	NA	NA	Circular walking linking four Walkers are Welcome towns: Otley, Burley in Wharfedale, Baildon and Bingley.
Westmorland and Furness Way	120	193	Westmorland and Furness	Alston	Furness Abbey	Opened in Autumn 2026; celebrates the council area created in 2023.
White Rose Walk	35	56	North Yorkshire	Kilburn White Horse	Roseberry Topping	Takes in the highest peaks in the area such as Carlton Moor, Sutton Bank and Urra Moor.
White Rose Way	104	167	Yorkshire	Leeds	Scarborough	Runs from Leeds to the Yorkshire Coast.
Wilberforce Way	60	97	Yorkshire	Kingston-upon-Hull	York	Waymarked route marking the bicentenary of the abolition of the British Transatlantic slave trade in the 1807 Act of Parliament introduced by Hull-born William Wilberforce.
Windermere Way	45	72	Cumbria	Bowness-on-Windermere	N/A	Circular route around Windermere in the Lake District.
Witton Weavers Way	33	53	Lancashire	Witton Park	N/A	Circular route around the West Pennine Moors, Blackburn and Darwen.
Yorkshire Heritage Way	42	68	West and North Yorkshire	Bradford	Ripon	Includes World Heritage Sites of Saltaire and Fountains Abbey.
Yorkshire Water Way	104	167	North Yorkshire, West Yorkshire, South Yorkshire	Kettlewell	Langsett Reservoir	Walk connecting over 25 reservoirs maintained by Yorkshire Water.

=== Wales ===
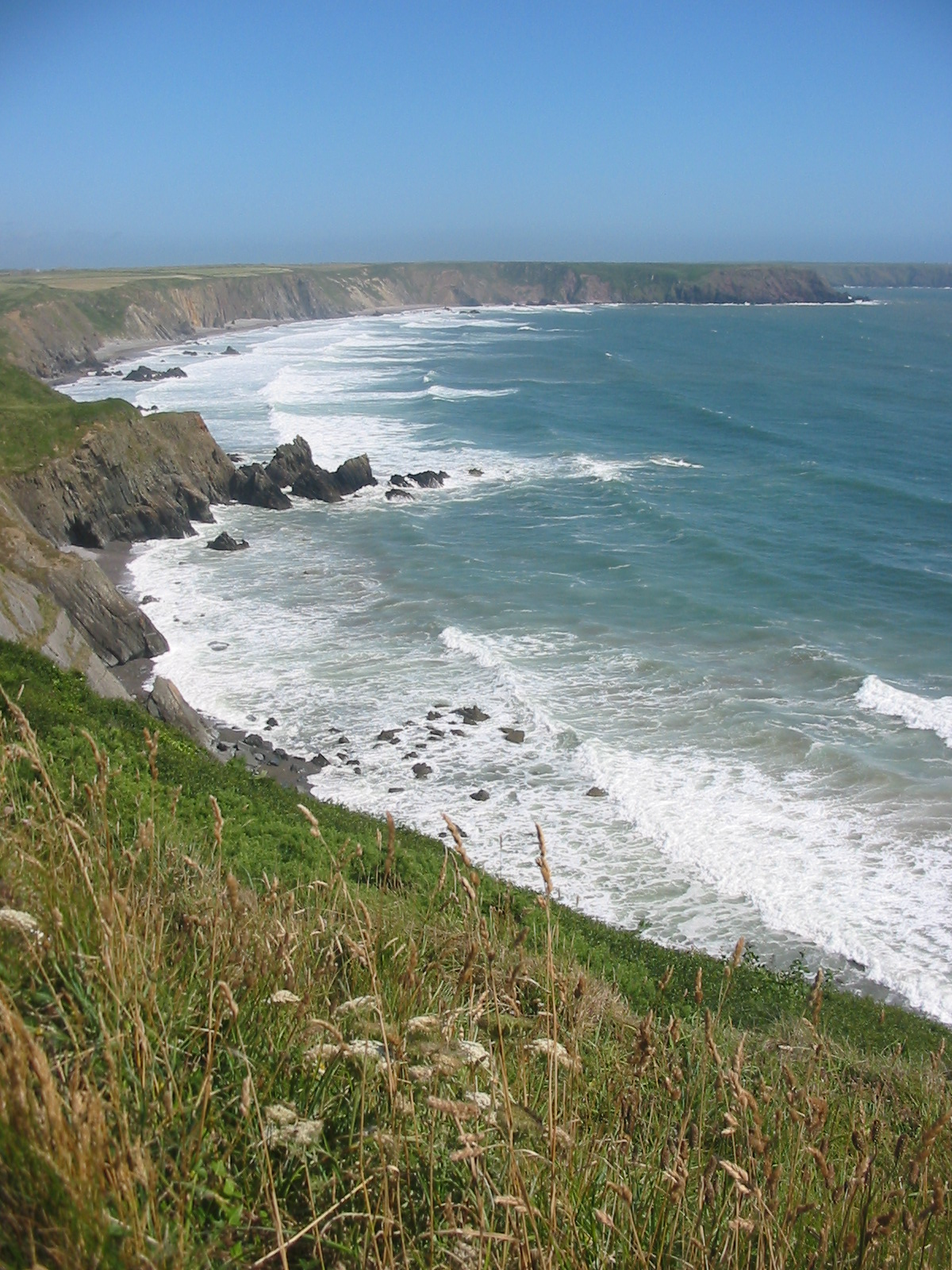
Pembrokeshire Coast

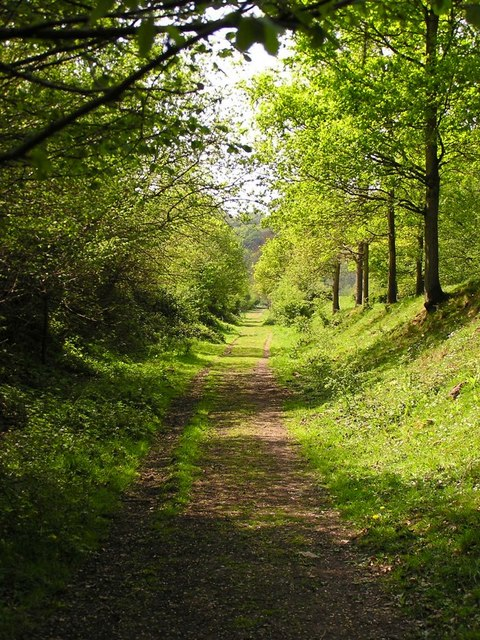
Wye Valley Walk

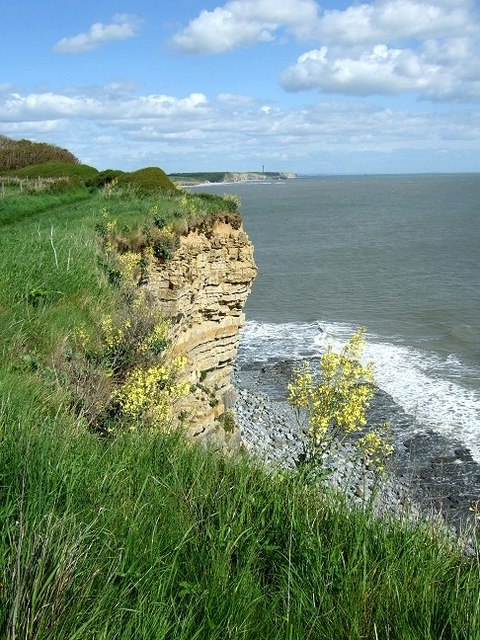
Valeways Millennium Heritage Trail

Name	Length		Region	Endpoint one	Endpoint two	Description
Name	mi	km	Region	Endpoint one	Endpoint two	Description
Beacons Way	100	161	Brecon Beacons	Abergavenny	Llangadog	An east–west route through the heart of the Brecon Beacons National Park
Cambrian Way	273	439		Cardiff	Conwy	An unwaymarked high level route
Cistercian Way	650	1,046				Circumnavigates Wales via its Cistercian Abbeys
Clwydian Way	151	243	Clwyd	Prestatyn		Circular route via Llangollen, Corwen and Denbigh
Dyfi Valley Way	107	172	West Wales	Aberdyfi	Ynyslas	
Epynt Way	41	66	Mid Wales	Sennybridge	Circular	Circular route split into 8 sections, broadly following the boundary of the Epynt Military Training Area
Heart of Wales Line Trail	142	229	South Wales	Craven Arms	Llanelli	Connects stations of the Heart of Wales Line
Landsker Borderlands Trail	60	97	Pembrokeshire and Carmarthenshire			Centred on Whitland
Marches Way	200	322	Welsh Marches	Chester	Cardiff	
Maelor Way	24	39	Wrexham	Bronygarth	Grindley Brook	Links Offa's Dyke Path, Shropshire Way, Sandstone Trail, Llangollen Canal, South Cheshire Way, and the Marches Way
Monmouthshire Way	116	187	Monmouthshire			Circular route
Monnow Valley Walk	40	64	South Wales	Monmouth	Hay-on-Wye	Follows the River Monnow
North Wales Path	60	97	North Wales	Bangor	Prestatyn	
North Wales Pilgrims Way	133	214	North Wales	Holywell	Bardsey Island	
O Fon i Fynwy	364	586	Anglesey, Carmarthenshire, Ceredigion, Conwy, Gwynedd, Monmouthshire, Powys	Holyhead	Chepstow	
Rhymney Valley Ridgeway Walk	28	45	South Wales	Rhymney		Circular walk around the Caerphilly basin
Saint Illtyd's Walk	64	103	Carmarthenshire	Pembrey Country Park	Margam Abbey	
Severn Way	210	338	Mid Wales and Western England	Plynlimon, the Cambrian Mountains	Bristol	Upper Section lies in Wales.
Snowdonia Slate Trail	83	134	Snowdonia	Bangor	Circular	Waymarked route through the slate areas of Snowdonia National Park
Snowdonia Way	97	156	Snowdonia	Machynlleth	Conwy	The standard/low-level Snowdonia Way avoids the highest summits; the dedicated Mountain Route variant takes on the central peaks and is 10 miles longer.
Taff Trail	68	109	South Wales	Brecon	Cardiff	
Usk Valley Walk	48	77	South Wales	Caerleon	Brecon	
Valeways Millennium Heritage Trail	69	111	Vale of Glamorgan	St Fagans	Peterston-super-Ely	
Wales Coast Path	870	1,400		Chepstow	Queensferry	Follows the whole of the coastline of Wales. Includes Pembrokeshire Coast Path National Trail and the following sections:
Anglesey Coastal Path	124	200	Anglesey	St Cybi's Church	Circular	
Llŷn Coastal Path	93	150	Gwynedd	Caernarfon	Porthmadog	Also known as The Pilgrim Trail
Ceredigion Coast Path	63	101	Ceredigion	Ynyslas	Cardigan	Still being developed, so not all waymarked
Wye Valley Walk	135	217		Chepstow	Plynlimon	Passes through England and Wales

=== Scotland ===
- Cape Wrath Trail, runs around 300 km (186 mi) from Fort William to Cape Wrath; as the route is unwaymarked, different guides to it suggest slightly different routes.
- Central Scottish Way, 251 km (156 mi) from Milngavie to Byrness (just over the border in Northumberland, England)
- Coast to Coast, 205 km (128 mi), Oban to St Andrews 128 miles, ISBN 978-0-9526900-8-5
- Edinburgh the walk, follows paths, green spaces, roads and cycleways through Edinburgh for 69 km starting at Edinburgh Castle and finishing at Holyrood Palace.
- John o' Groats Trail, 231 km (145 mi) from Inverness to John o' Groats
- Sir Walter Scott Way from Moffat, Dumfries and Galloway to Cockburnspath, Scottish Borders
- The East Highland Way, runs from Fort William to Aviemore

=== Northern Ireland ===
- Ulster Way, runs for 1023 km (636 mi), mainly in Northern Ireland, with some sections in the Republic of Ireland

=== The Macmillan Ways ===
The Macmillan Ways are a set of paths that promotes and raises money for the Macmillan Cancer Relief charity.

Name	Length		Region	Endpoint one	Endpoint two	Description
Name	mi	km	Region	Endpoint one	Endpoint two	Description
Macmillan Way	290	467	Southern England	Abbotsbury in Dorset	Boston, Lincolnshire	For the first 30 miles it crosses open fen then it follows the oolitic limestone belt. It is the longest of the Macmillan Ways.
Macmillan Way West	102	164	Somerset and Devon	Castle Cary	Barnstaple	Follows the River Cary and then onto the Quantock Hills and to Exmoor.
Cross Britain Way	280	451	England and Wales	Boston, Lincolnshire	Barmouth, Gwynedd	The terrain varies from the flat land of The Fens to the Welsh Berwyn Mountains.
Macmillan Abbotsbury Langport Link	40	64	South West England	Abbotsbury	Langport	Allows walkers to go 126 miles (203 km) coast-to-coast from Abbotsbury to Barnstaple, using the Macmillan Way West.
Macmillan Cross Cotswold Pathway	36	58	Cotswolds	Banbury Cross	Bath, Somerset	Provides links from much of Oxfordshire to the Macmillan Way.
Cotswold Link	21	34	Gloucestershire and Oxfordshire	Chipping Campden	Banbury Cross	Links to the Cotswold Way National Trail.

== European walking routes ==
Several European walking routes pass through the United Kingdom. They all use sections of UK long-distance paths.

- E2 from Stranraer to Dover, with an alternative route to Harwich
- E8 from Liverpool to Hull
- E9 from Plymouth to Dover
- The North Sea Trail covers seven countries with North Sea coastlines.

== See also ==
- Adventure travel for worldwide options
- Backpacking and Ultralight backpacking
- Hiking and Thru-hiking
- Hillwalking
- Land's End to John o' Groats
- List of Conservation topics
- List of long-distance trails
- Long Distance Walkers Association
- Raad ny Foillan, a long-distance path on the Isle of Man
- Ramblers' Association
- Scrambling
- Slow Ways
- Walking in London
- Walking in the United Kingdom
