= Ivinghoe Hills =

Hills in Ivinghoe, Buckinghamshire, England

Coordinates: 51.833861°N 0.603099°W

- Site of Special Scientific Interest
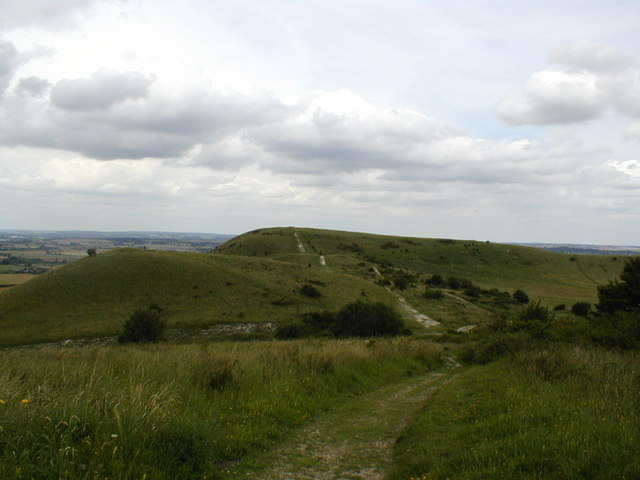
- View of Ivinghoe Beacon from Steps Hill
- Location of Ivinghoe Hills.
- Area of search: Buckinghamshire
- Grid reference: SP963159
- Interest: Biological
- Area: 210.4 hectares (520 acres)
- Notification date: 1984
- Location map: Magic Map

Ivinghoe Hills is a 210.4-hectare (520-acre) Site of Special Scientific Interest in Ivinghoe in Buckinghamshire, and part of the Chilterns Area of Outstanding Natural Beauty. It is listed in A Nature Conservation Review. The Ridgeway long-distance footpath ends and the Icknield Way Path starts in the site on Ivinghoe Beacon. An Iron Age fort on Ivinghoe Beacon and a tumulus on Gallows Hill are Scheduled Monuments. The site is part of the National Trust's Ashridge Estate, apart from a small area which belongs to Buckinghamshire County Council.

The site is biologically rich, and it has varied habitats including unimproved chalk grassland, which has some nationally rare species, semi-natural woodland and scrub. Some of the grassland is grazed by sheep and cattle. There are two areas of ancient woodland. An area of ploughed land on Gallows Hill has been retained within the SSSI because some of the weeds are nationally scarce.

There is access from the National Trust car park off the B488 road.
