= Gordano =

Gordano may refer to:

- Gordano Valley in Somerset, England
- Gordano Round, a long-distance trail in the Gordano Valley
- Gordano Messaging Suite, a brand of e-mail server
- Gordano School, a secondary school in Portishead, Somerset
- Gordano services, a motorway service station on the edge of the Gordano Valley
