= Strethall =

Village in Essex, England

Coordinates: 52.0324°N 0.1617°E

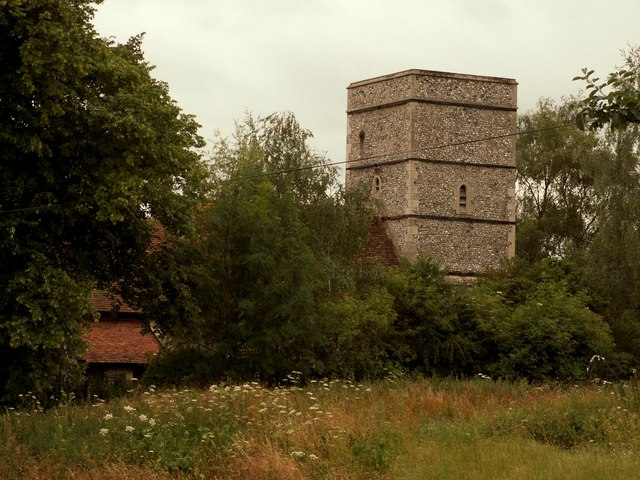
- St. Mary's church, Strethall.

- Location within Essex
- Population: 27 (Parish, 2021)
- OS grid reference: TL482393
  - London: 39.5 mi (63.6 km)
- Civil parish: Strethall
- District: Uttlesford
- Shire county: Essex
- Region: East
- Country: England
- Sovereign state: United Kingdom
- Post town: SAFFRON WALDEN
- Postcode district: CB11
- Police: Essex
- Fire: Essex
- Ambulance: East of England
- UK Parliament: North West Essex
- Website: Strethall homepage

Strethall is a village and civil parish in the Uttlesford district, in the county of Essex, England, near the town of Saffron Walden. At the 2021 census the parish had a population of 27.

Having suffered no casualties in World War I it is known as one of the thankful villages. The village is featured on Darren Hayman's album, Thankful Villages Volume 1.

The Icknield Way Path passes through the village on its 110-mile route between Ivinghoe Beacon in Buckinghamshire and Knettishall Heath in Suffolk. The A route for walkers, horse riders and off-road cyclists also passes through the village.

== See also ==
- The Hundred Parishes
