= Swans Way =

Swans Way may refer to:

- Swans Way (band), a British pop group
- Swan's Way (footpath), a long-distance footpath in England

== See also ==
- Swann's Way, a volume of the novel In Search of Lost Time
