= Yarnsdale =

Dale in Lancashire

Coordinates: 53.6562°N 2.4416°W

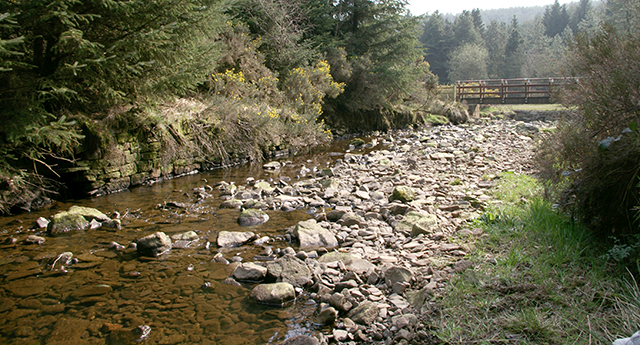

Yarnsdale is a dale or valley in Lancashire. The name is derived from the heron or hern.

It contains a small sandstone quarry, also known as Cadshaw Quarry at grid reference 706.178, situated to the north west of Turton and Entwistle Reservoir in the borough of Blackburn with Darwen. It is used mainly by rock climbers and hikers who use it as a short cut between Turton Moor and the reservoir, passing the Strawbury Duck Hotel, (known for Black Sheep bitter), at Entwistle. There is a station on the East Lancashire Railway line at Entwistle. Yarnsdale contains Fairy Battery – an outcrop of rock popular with climbers. The site was the secret meeting place of non-conformist worshippers in the 17th century. Opposite the outcrop on the other side of Cadshaw Brook is a quarry complex with extensive mine caverns, now filled in. The Witton Weavers Way long-distance path passes close to the north.
