= Icknield Way Path =

110-mile footpath in East Anglia, England

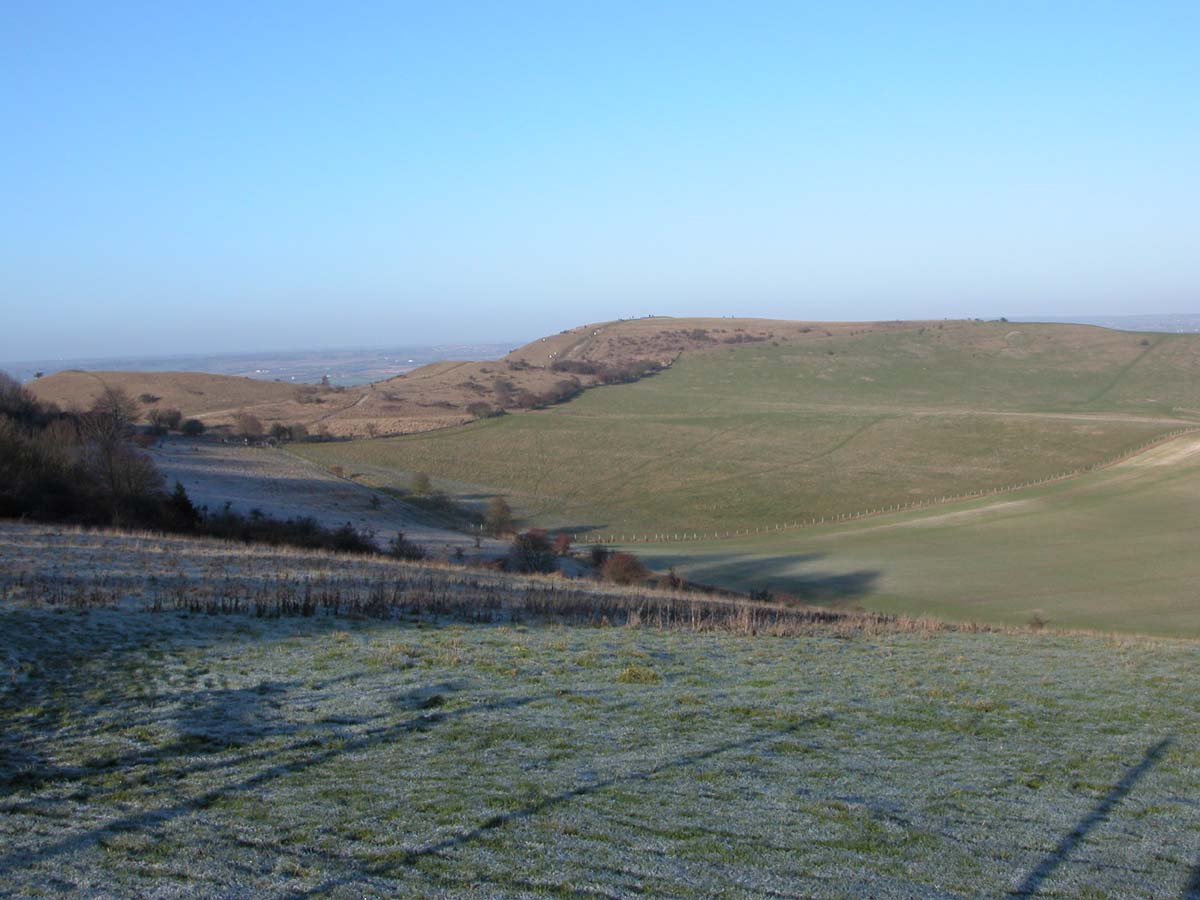
- Ivinghoe Beacon is a trailhead
- Length: 110 miles (177 km)
- Location: Eastern England, United Kingdom
- Designation: Long-distance footpaths in the United Kingdom
- Trailheads: Ivinghoe Beacon, Buckinghamshire; Knettishall Heath, Suffolk
- Use: Hiking
- Season: All year

The Icknield Way Path is a long distance footpath in the East of England. It follows England's chalk ridge through Buckinghamshire, Bedfordshire, Hertfordshire, Cambridgeshire, Essex, Suffolk and Norfolk, along a collection of ancient tracks, Roman roads and more recently upgraded footpaths. Along with The Ridgway, the old Icknield Way is thought to be "the oldest road in Britain".

The walking route is around 110 miles (180 km) long - between Ivinghoe Beacon in Buckinghamshire to the south-west and Knettishall Heath in Suffolk to the north-east. A parallel equestrian and mountain biking route - the Icknield Way Trail - is slightly longer, at 170 miles (270 km). The Icknield Way Association is set up to promote and publicise the routes.

Together with the Wessex Ridgeway, The Ridgeway and Peddars Way, the Icknield Way is part of a coast-to-coast walking route, around 363 miles (584 km) long. In the south, this Greater Ridgeway route's trailhead is at Lyme Regis, on the English Channel in Dorset. Its northern trailhead is at Holme-next-the-Sea, on the North Sea in Norfolk.

The Icknield Way Path was recognised by local authorities in 1992. The association was founded by Charles Thurstan Shaw, archaeologist and long-distance walker, in 1984, the same year he produced the first walker’s guide to the route.

== Route ==
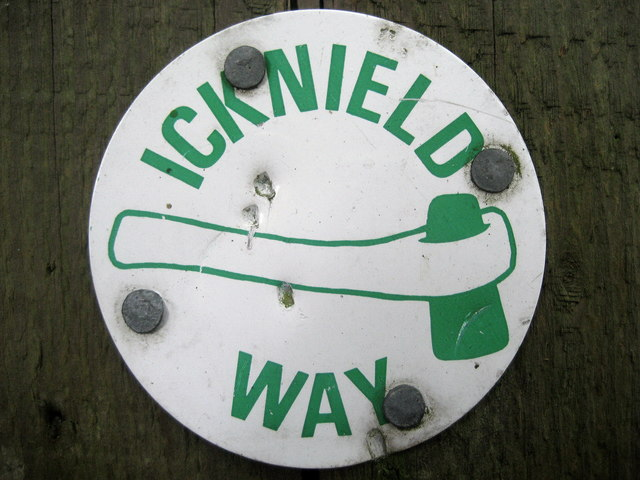
An example of an Icknield Way waymark

The Icknield Way is signposted, using an axe icon. The neolithic hand-axe icon was chosen by the Icknield Way Association "in its very early days". The first steering committee "intended the axe to clearly indicate the antiquity of the route of the Icknield Way and its connection along the chalk of southern England with other existing trails".

Rising 233 metres (764 ft) above sea level, Ivinghoe Beacon marks the Icknield Way trailhead in the south-west. The Beacon is also The Ridgeway National Trail's north-eastern trailhead. It is in the Chilterns National Landscape, and owned and managed by the National Trust. The trailhead is around 4 miles (6.4 km) north of Tring, Hertfordshire. The National Trust manages a car park off nearby Beacon Road.

The footpath crosses Dagnall, Whipsnade, Dunstable, Houghton Regis, Toddington, Streatley, Pirton, Ickleford, Letchworth, Baldock, Clothall, Wallington, Sandon, Therfield, Royston, Heydon, Chrishall, Elmdon, Strethall, Great Chesterford, Linton, Balsham, Willingham Green, Brinkley, Burrough Green, Stetchworth, Cheveley, Ashley, Dalham, Gazeley, Tuddenham, Icklingham and Euston.

The Icknield Way's trailhead in the north-east is at Knettishall Heath, 175 hectares (1.75 km^{2}) of lowland heath, grassland and woodland managed by Suffolk Wildlife Trust. There is a car park on-site. The River Little Ouse marks the nature reserve's northern boundary. Knettishall Heath marks the Peddars Way's southern trailhead.

An alternative northern trailhead is at Thetford, near the 12th-century Thetford Priory - which fell into ruin after the reign of Henry VIII and its suppression - and the town's railway station. This trailhead is almost 6 miles (9.7 km) west of Knettishall Heath, and leaves the main path to the south of Elveden.

The footpath is close to, but does not cross through: Luton; Hitchin; Saffron Walden; and Newmarket. The A505 and A11 roads follow a similar, parallel route between Dunstable and Thetford - through the Luton, Hitchin, Letchworth, Baldock, Royston, Great Chesterford and Newmarket areas.
