= West Deane Way =

Long-distance footpath in Somerset, England

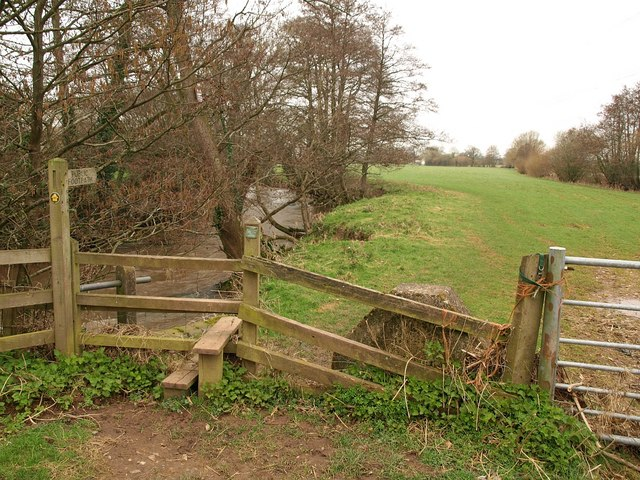
- The West Deane Way at Hele Bridge
- Length: 45 mi (72 km)
- Location: Somerset, England
- Use: Hiking

The West Deane Way is a footpath in the Taunton Deane area of Somerset, England.

It is a 45 miles (72 km) circular walk in the Vale of Taunton Deane.

== See also ==
- Long-distance footpaths in the UK
- List of local nature reserves in England
