= Welcome Way =

Footpath in West Yorkshire, England

Coordinates: 53.885°N 1.800°W

The Welcome Way is a 36-mile (58 km) walking route in West Yorkshire, England. It connects Otley, Baildon, Burley in Wharfedale and Bingley, and takes its name from the Walkers are Welcome scheme of which all four towns are members. It was launched in 2015. It is waymarked in both directions, and good public transport connections enable walkers to use the route for a variety of short walks.

A second edition of the guidebook to the Welcome Way was published in 2021 after several improvements had been made to the route.

The Welcome Way route has formed the basis of an ultramarathon route.
