= Abbott's Hike =

Long-distance footpath in Northern England

Abbot's Hike
- Length: 171 km (106 mi)
- Location: Cumbria/North Yorkshire/West Yorkshire, England
- Designation: UK National Trail
- Trailheads: Ilkley, West Yorkshire; 53.925°N 1.817°W; Pooley Bridge, Cumbria; 54.613°N 2.819°W
- Use: Hiking
- Difficulty: Challenging

Abbott's Hike is a long distance footpath in Northern England in the United Kingdom.

== The route ==
Abbott's Hike runs for 171 kilometres (106 mi) from Ilkley in West Yorkshire to Pooley Bridge in Cumbria. The walk passes through the counties of West Yorkshire, North Yorkshire and Cumbria and provides links between the Three Peaks Walk with which it shares 23 kilometres (14 mi), 4.8 kilometres (3 mi) of the Pennine Way, and 40 kilometres (25 mi) of the Dales Way.

The walking is classed as challenging and is on upland and moorland.

It is named after its originator, Peter Abbott.

== See also ==
- List of long-distance footpaths
