= Swan's Way (footpath) =

Footpath and bridle route in England

Coordinates: 51.8251°N 0.8955°W

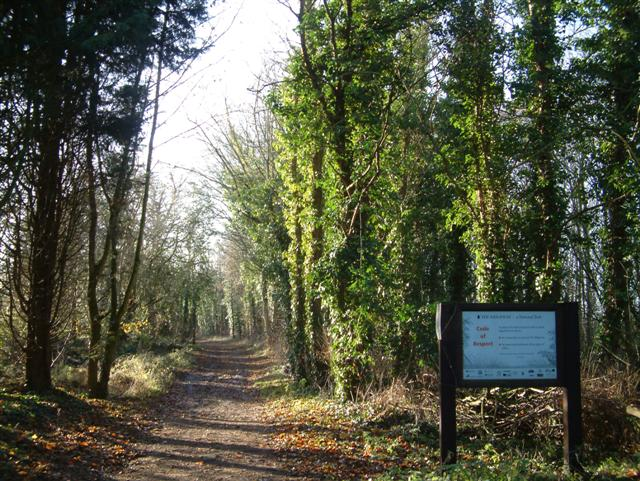
Ridgeway, Swan's Way & Icknield Way

Swan's Way is a long distance bridle route and footpath in Northamptonshire, Buckinghamshire and Oxfordshire, England. It runs 65 miles (105 km) from Salcey Forest, Northamptonshire to Goring-On-Thames, Oxfordshire. Although designed for horseriders by riders, it is a multi-use trail also available to walkers and cyclists.

For walkers the path links with the Ridgeway National Trail, the western end of the Icknield Way Path, the Ouse Valley Way and the Three Shires Way.
