= Roof of England Walk =

Long-distance footpath in northern England

The Roof of England Walk is a 188-mile (301-km) footpath in the North Pennines, England. It follows a circular route through Westmorland and Furness, Cumberland, Northumberland and County Durham, with a short section in North Yorkshire, and passes features including High Force in Teesdale, Blanchland Abbey, High Cup Nick, Cross Fell (the highest point of the walk, at 893 m (2,930 ft)) and the Tan Hill Inn. The path was officially opened in September 2025. It is generally described as an anticlockwise direction, starting and finishing at Appleby-in-Westmorland.
