= Westmorland and Furness Way =

120-mile footpath in Cumbria, England

- Length: 120 mi (193 km)
- Location: Westmorland and Furness, Northern England
- Designation: Long distance footpath
- Trailheads: Alston 54°48′36″N 2°26′28″W; Furness Abbey 54°8′7″N 3°11′52″W
- Use: Hiking

The Westmorland and Furness Way is a 120-mile (190 km) walking route in Westmorland and Furness, north-west England. It connects Alston, in the Pennines in the north of the council area, and Furness Abbey, near Barrow-in-Furness in the south west, and passes through the North Pennines National Landscape, the Yorkshire Dales National Park and the Lake District National Park.

It was officially opened on 15 September 2026, at an event in Sedbergh which formed part of the town's annual Walking and Wellbeing Festival.

The route was developed by Westmorland and Furness Council, which was established in 2023. The council said that the route would "celebrate the geography and spectacular scenery of Westmorland and Furness" and would bring visitors to the area and benefit the economy of local communities.

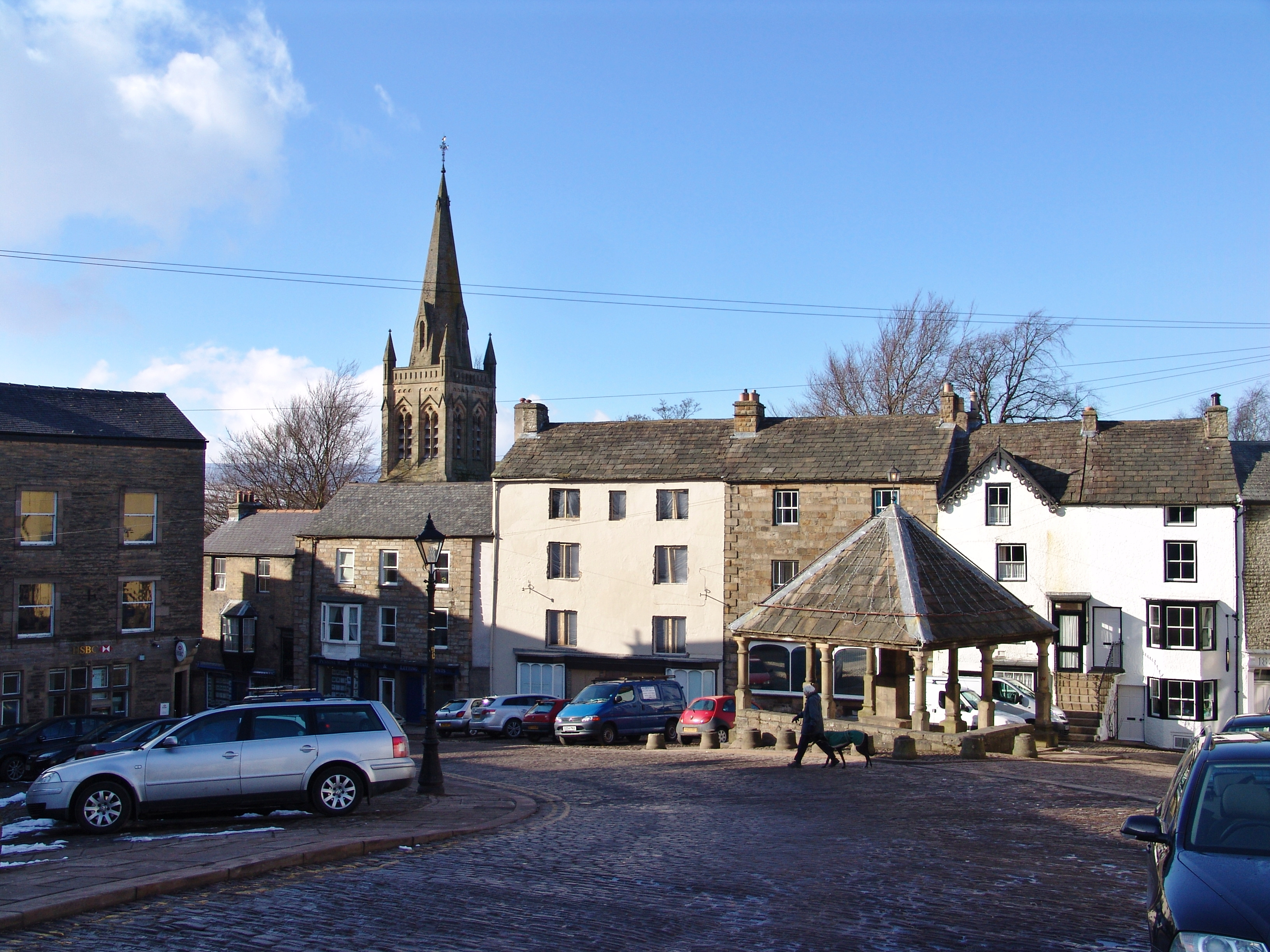
Alston town centre

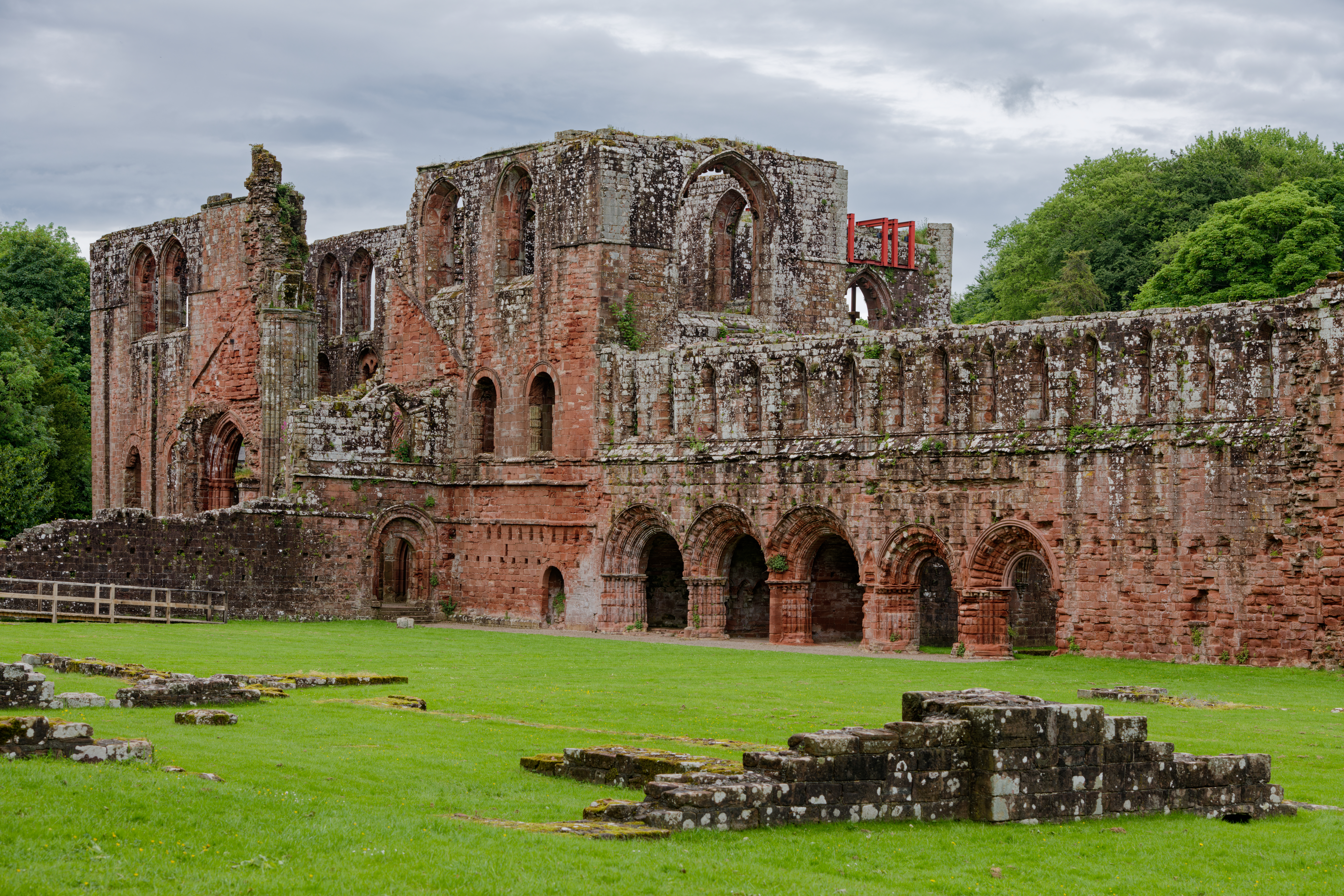
Furness Abbey
