= Slow Ways =

Website of walking routes in the UK

- Area served: United Kingdom
- Owner: Slow Ways CIC
- Founder: Dan Raven-Ellison
- Website: beta.slowways.org
- Commercial: No
- Registration: Optional (required to contribute)
- Users: 700 volunteers (2020)
- Launched: January 2021; 5 years ago

Slow Ways is a website launched in 2021 which enables users to plot a route between two settlements in the United Kingdom. The routes are not intended to be the fastest route possible, but rather encourage walkers to rediscover unused footpaths and engage in more leisurely walks.

== Features ==
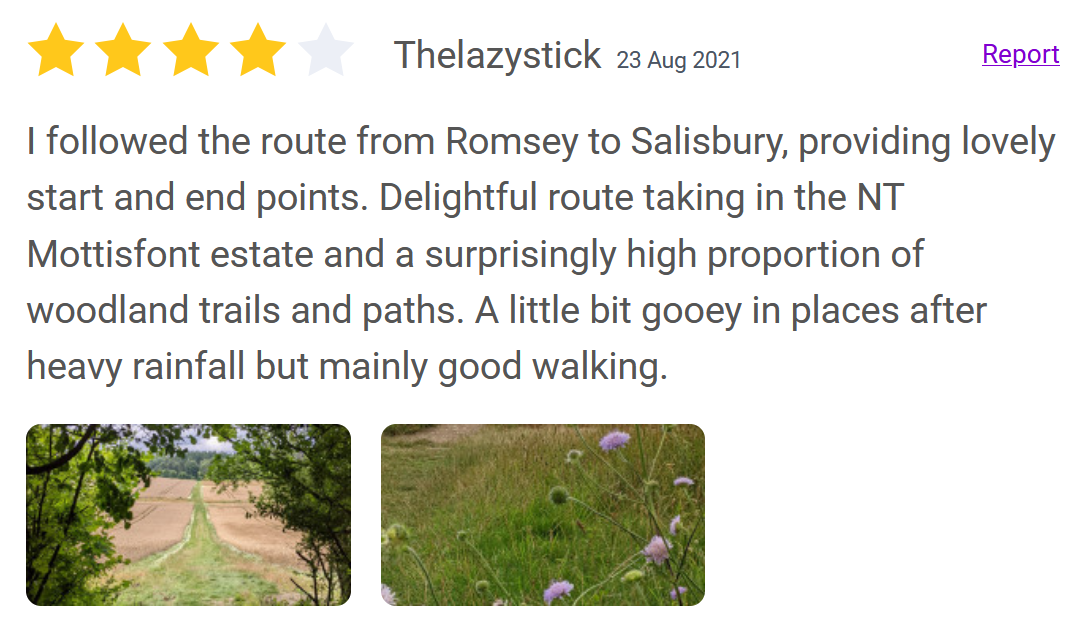
A review of the "Salrom one" route between Salisbury and Romsey in England, uploaded by a Slow Ways user

Slow Ways routes are mapped on the Ordnance Survey maps platform and made available for free on the Slow Ways website. Users can plot a route between two settlements, or chain multiple settlements into a larger route. Routes are named by combining the first three letters of the origin and destination, such as Salwin for the route between Salisbury and Winchester.

Routes on the website are generally designed to be as easy as possible to navigate, avoiding difficult terrain and diversions to points of interest. They are usually less than 20 km in length, and where possible pass through villages on a regular basis. Routes display various accessibility features, such as their suitability for wheelchair users.

== History ==
Slow Ways was created by Dan Raven-Ellison and is supported by Ordnance Survey. Raven-Ellison hoped that the website would allow walkers to rediscover unused footpaths, walk in place of driving or taking public transport, and engage with slower travel between locations. He was inspired to start the project while on a walk between Salisbury and Winchester. Raven-Ellison also hopes the routes will encourage local walkers to campaign for paths to remain accessible and well-maintained.

During the United Kingdom's COVID-19 lockdown, 700 volunteers contributed and verified 7,000 routes for the website over the course of three months. The website was then made available to a wider range of volunteers to walk the routes and verify that they were safe and enjoyable. The website was launched publicly in January 2021. Following the initial launch, Raven-Ellison hopes that users will test the routes out and provide feedback and suggest improvements.

The website has received funding from organisations including Paths For All and the Kestrelman Trust.
