= Abbeys Amble =

Long-distance footpath in North Yorkshire, England

Coordinates: 54°08′01″N 1°31′04″W

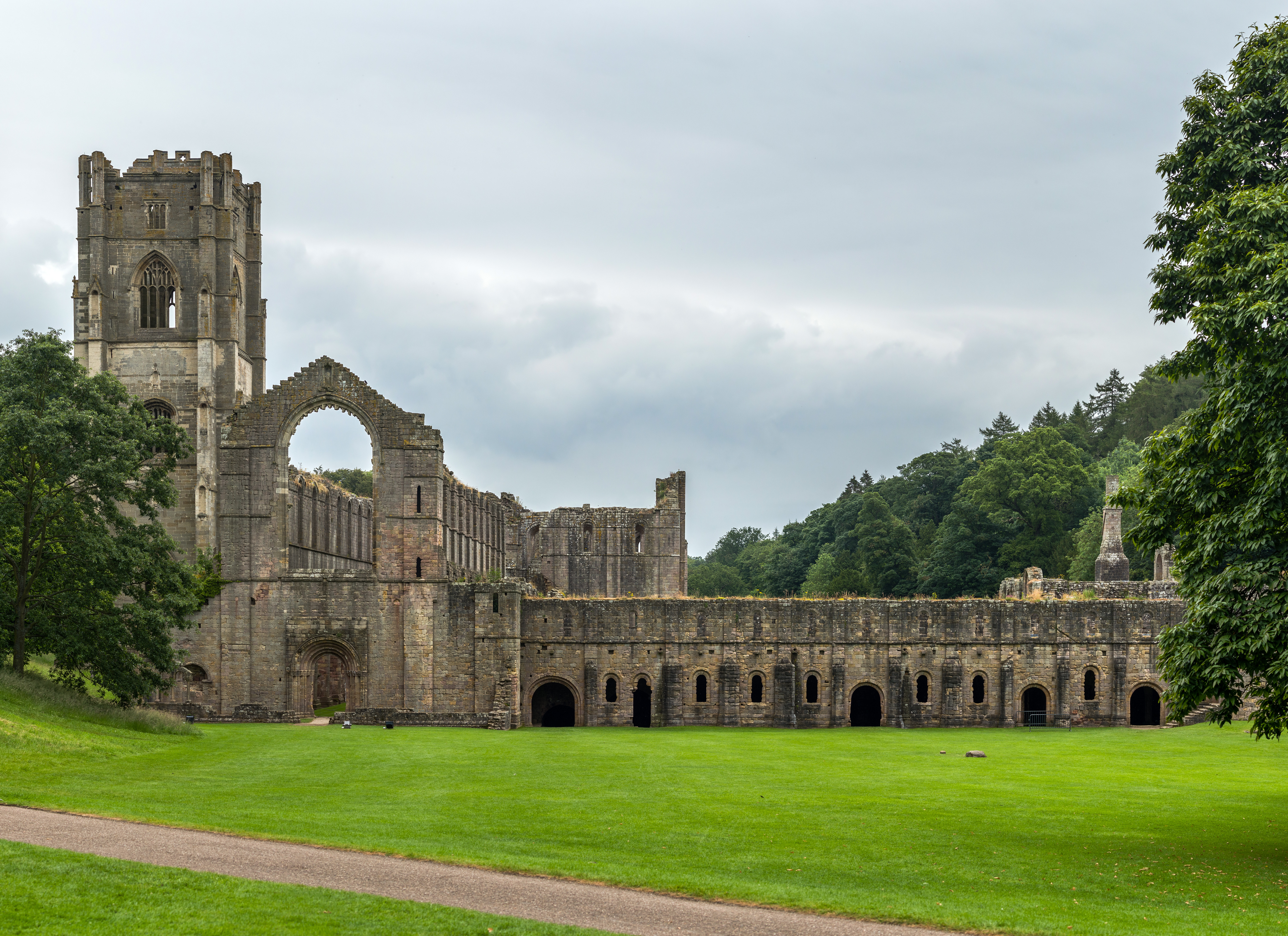
- Fountains Abbey, on the route
- Length: 104 mi (167 km)
- Location: North Yorkshire, England
- Trailheads: circular around Ripon
- Use: Hiking
- Sights: Abbeys and Castles

The Abbeys Amble is a long-distance path in North Yorkshire, England. It is a circular walk of 104 miles (167 km), based on Ripon. It links three abbeys – Fountains Abbey, Bolton Abbey and Jervaulx Abbey – and three castles – Ripley Castle, Bolton Castle and Middleham Castle.
