= Monmouthshire Way =

116-mile footpath in Wales and England

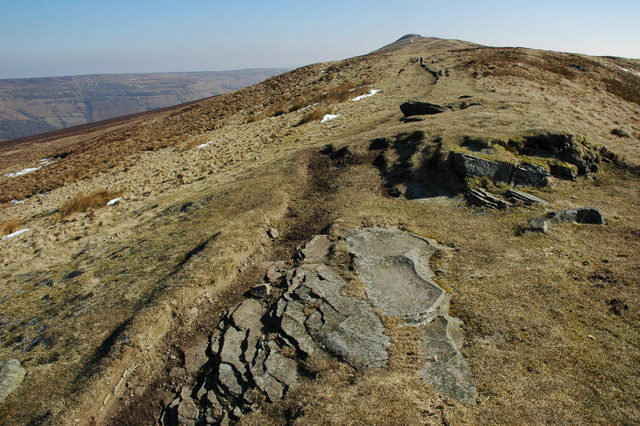
Chwarel y Fan, the county top

The Monmouthshire Way is a circular long-distance footpath of 116 miles that explores the historic county of Monmouth. Short sections of the route trespass into the neighbouring counties of Gloucester, Hereford and Brecon. It was designed by the South Wales Long Distance Walkers Association and is currently not waymarked.

Divided into eight sections, the walk visits the towns of Chepstow, Monmouth, Abergavenny, Pontypool and Usk and passes close by those of Blaenavon and Abertillery. Starting from Chepstow, the route meanders across the fertile agricultural land of the county before rising into the Brecon Beacons National Park where it takes in the county top, Chwarel y Fan. The route then passes through the UNESCO World Heritage 'Forgotten Landscape' near Blaenavon, a key location that was so important during the Industrial Revolution. The eastern valleys and their broad whale back ridges are walked, and the wide variety of terrain visited also includes the ancient forestry of Wentwood and the Caldicot Level, originally drained by the Romans.

== Stages ==
- Stage 1: Chepstow to Monmouth: 17 miles.
- Stage 2: Monmouth to Pandy: 17 miles.
- Stage 3: Pandy to Llanthony Priory: 16 miles.
- Stage 4: Llanthony Priory to Abergavenny: 12 miles.
- Stage 5: Abergavenny to Pontypool: 16 miles.
- Stage 6: Pontypool to Usk: 13 miles.
- Stage 7: Usk to Rogiet: 15 miles.
- Stage 8: Rogiet to Chepstow: 10 miles.
