= Gordano Round =

Long-distance footpath in Somerset, England

- Length: 43 km (27 mi)
- Location: South West England
- Designation: UK National Trail
- Trailheads: Portishead, North Somerset; Clevedon, North Somerset; Abbots Leigh, North Somerset.
- Use: Hiking
- Elevation change: 750m
- Highest point: Failand, 508 ft (155 m)

The Gordano Round (/ɡɔːrˈdeɪnoʊ/) is a 27-mile (43 km) recreational Long-distance trail, running as a figure of eight around the Gordano Valley near Portishead in North Somerset, England.

== History ==
The Gordano Round route was first suggested by Jim Dyer of the Gordano Footpath Group in 1983 and walked by four members of the group in 1984. It was adopted by North Somerset Council as a recreational route and now marked on the Ordnance Survey Explorer map 154. The route is described in the book The Gordano Round first published in 2000.

A memorial to Jim Dyer who died in 2012 was set up on the Portishead Coast path on the route in 2014.

== Views ==
The route starts from Portishead and follows the coast path to Clevedon with views of Wales and both Severn road crossings. In Clevedon it climbs to the top of Dial Hill affording views as far as the Black Mountains in Wales, Brean Down and the Mendips to the South. Crossing over to the Clevedon Court Woods (above the National Trust property) and the Court Woods, there are new views across the Gordano Valley as it climbs to the Iron Age Cadbury Camp. Dropping back into the valley it reaches the 14th century Black Horse pub before climbing up to the highest point on the route at 155 metres (509 ft) in Failand with more views over the Severn Estuary and Wales.

Back across on the Northern side of the valley, the route passes the Black Rock quarry with its old workings before returning to the start in Portishead.

== Places of interest ==
The 27-mile (43 km) trail runs in a figure of eight from Portishead, North Somerset via Clevedon, Clapton in Gordano, Failand and Abbots Leigh.

It passes numerous places of interest, including Battery Point, the site of an English Civil War fort, Black Nore Lighthouse, Clevedon Pier, Cadbury Camp and the Black Horse Pub in Clapton, a 14th Century public house.

== Other recreational use ==
- Besides being popular with walkers, the Gordano Round is also well used by runners and 2015 saw the first running of a marathon race organised by Portishead Running Club on 14 November.

== See also ==
- Long-distance footpaths in the United Kingdom
