= Reivers Way =

Long-distance footpath in Northumberland, England

Coordinates: 55.29°N 2.01°W

The Reivers Way is a long-distance footpath in Northumberland, passing through the Northumberland National Park and the Cheviot Hills. Totalling 242 kilometres (150 mi) it starts in the Roman township of Corbridge and crosses the Hexhamshire Common before heading up along Hadrians Wall. Via Wark and Rothbury it heads into the Cheviot range via Clennell Street leading up to The Cheviot before dropping down to Wooler. From Wooler the path passes through Belford to the Northumbrian Saxon's capital of Bamburgh, and then follows the Northumberland Coast Path through Seahouses to Alnmouth.
