= Wessex Ridgeway =

Footpath in south west England

Coordinates: 51°16′N 2°3.2′W

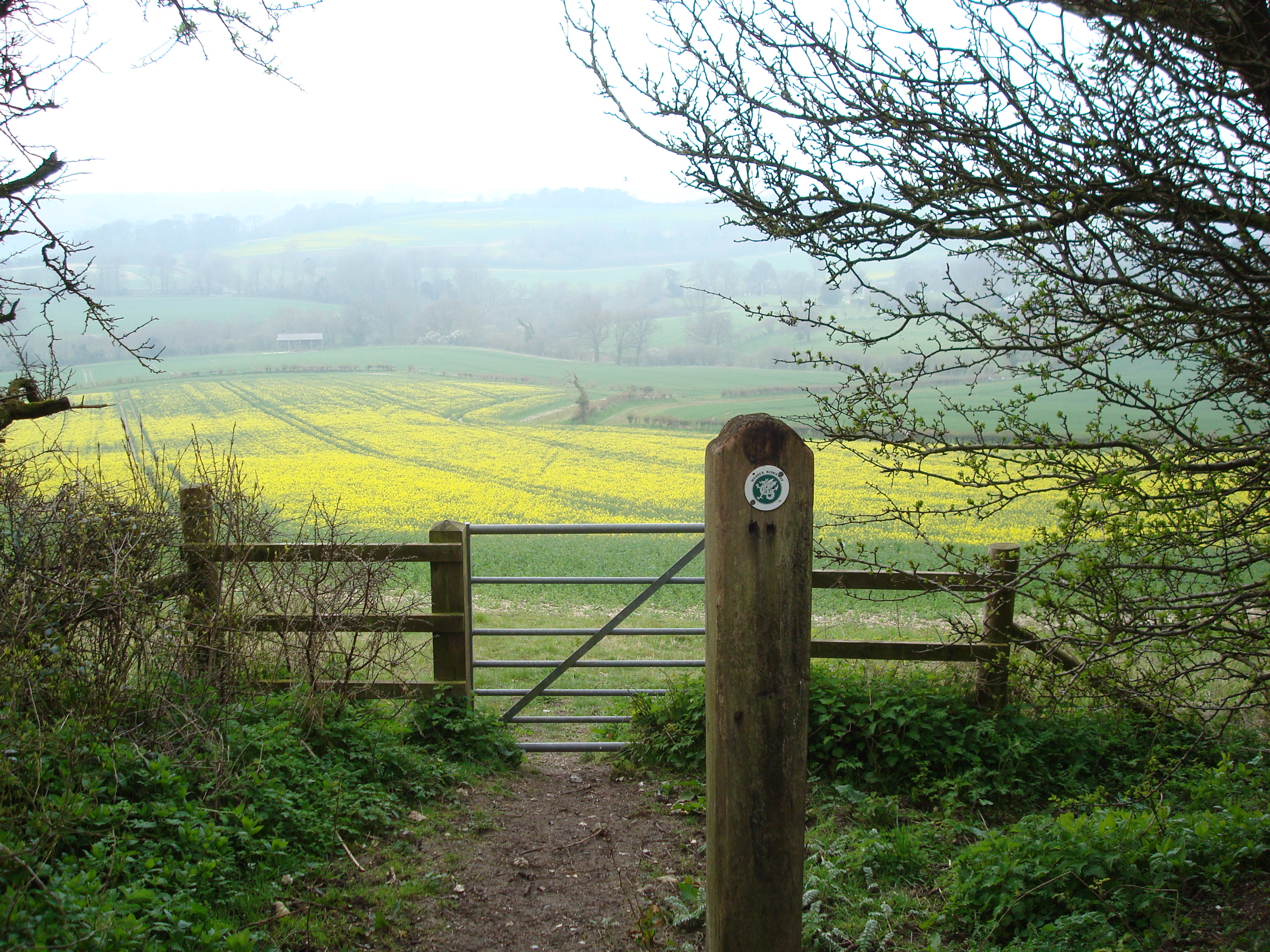
Wessex Ridgeway near Minterne Magna

The Wessex Ridgeway is a long-distance footpath in southwest England. It runs 136 miles (219 km) from Marlborough in Wiltshire to Lyme Regis in Dorset, via the northern edge of Salisbury Plain and across Cranborne Chase AONB. The footpath was opened in 1994.

At Marlborough, the footpath meets the Ridgeway National Trail which continues into Oxfordshire and Buckinghamshire. Two further long-distance footpaths extend to Hunstanton in Norfolk; together, the four paths are referred to as the Greater Ridgeway.

== Landmarks ==
- Bell Hill
- Coney's Castle
- Lambert's Castle
- Pilsdon Pen
- Lewesdon Hill
- Waddon Hill
- Scratchbury Hill
