= Greater Ridgeway =

Long distance footpath crossing England

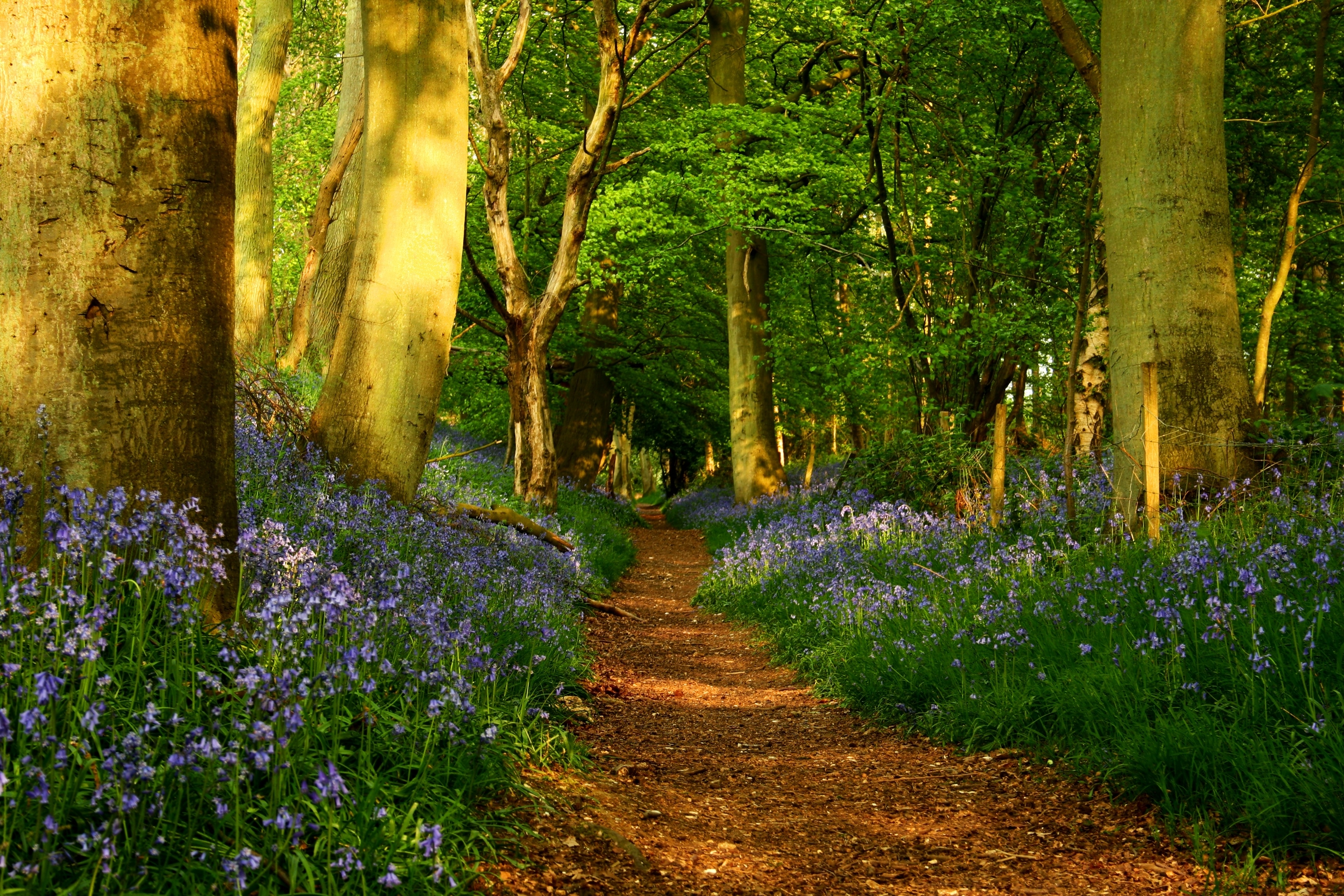
- The Ridgeway in Grim's Ditch near Mongewell lies on the trail
- Length: 362 mi (583 km)
- Location: England
- Designation: UK National Trail
- Trailheads: Lyme Regis; Hunstanton
- Use: Hiking

The Greater Ridgeway, also known as the Great Chalk Way, is a 362-mile long-distance footpath crossing England from Lyme Regis in Dorset to Hunstanton in Norfolk. It is a combined route which is made by joining four long-distance footpaths: the Wessex Ridgeway, The Ridgeway National Trail, the Icknield Way and the Peddars Way National Trail.
