= Walkers are Welcome =

Organization

- Founded: 18 February 2007
- Region served: United Kingdom

The Walkers are Welcome scheme is a community-led initiative operating in England, Scotland and Wales. The Walkers are Welcome Towns Network claims that the scheme helps strengthen a town’s reputation as a destination for visitors, and also brings benefits to the local economy, encouraging the towns to view walkers as "economic assets".

The scheme was first proposed in Summer 2006 by a local walkers group in the Yorkshire town of Hebden Bridge and formally launched on 18 February 2007. Since then, it has expanded rapidly and more than ninety towns and villages have been granted Walkers are Welcome status.

The current patron is the Ramblers Association vice-president Kate Ashbrook.
