= Witton Weavers Way =

Long-distance footpath in Lancashire, England

Coordinates: 53.743123°N 2.519150°W

Witton Weavers Way is a waymarked long-distance footpath in Lancashire in England.

== Length of the route ==
Witton Weavers Way runs for 51 km (32 mi).

== The route ==
The route comprises a network of four circular trails and traditionally starts at Witton Country Park.

The route is designed to incorporate Weavers' cottages, Tudor period halls and country houses and in part follow Roman roads.
