= Ivinghoe Beacon =

Hill and landmark in Buckinghamshire, England

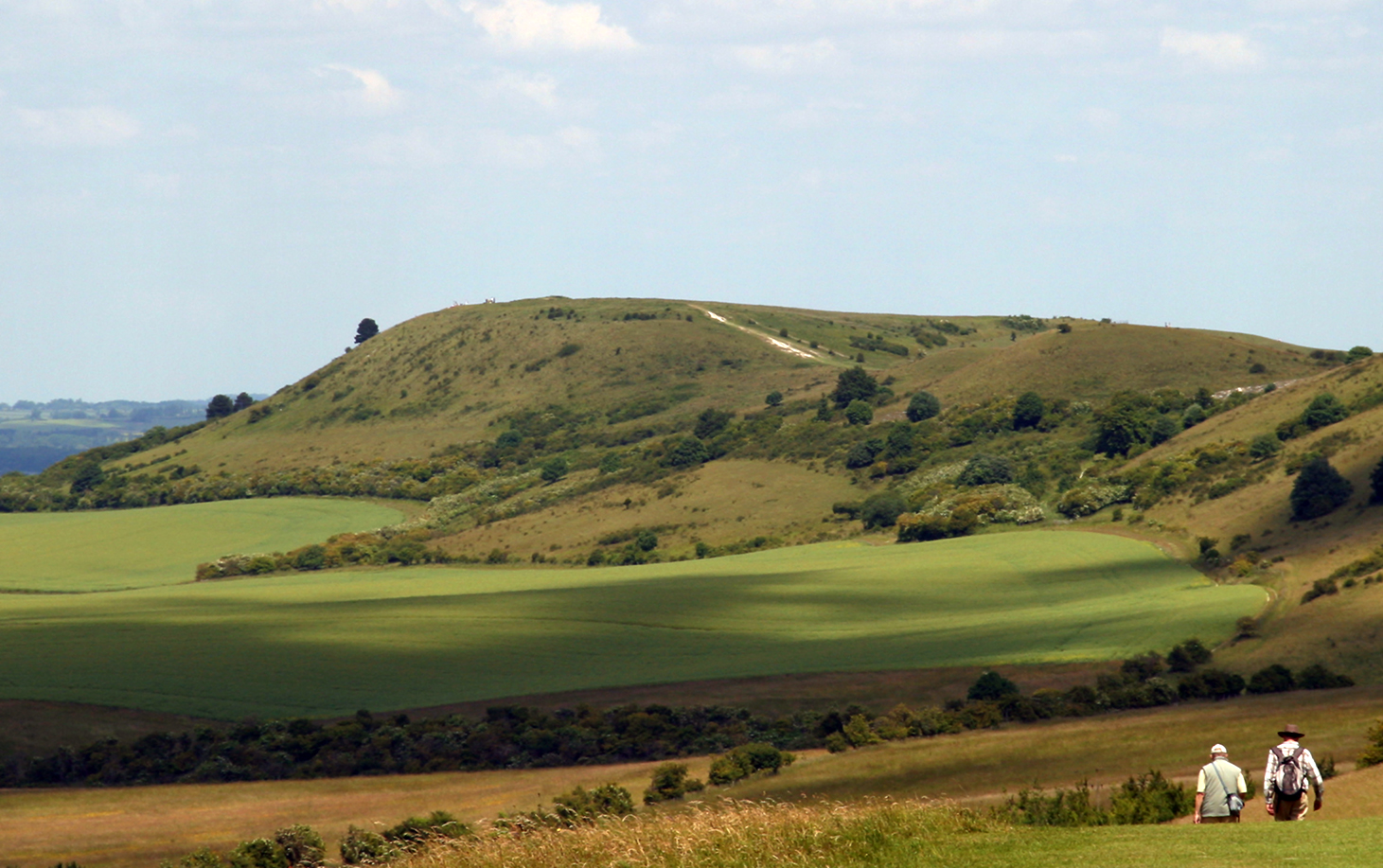
- Ivinghoe Beacon, looking north from the Ridgeway

Highest point
- Elevation: 233 m (764 ft)
- Coordinates: 51°50′31″N 0°36′21″W

Geography
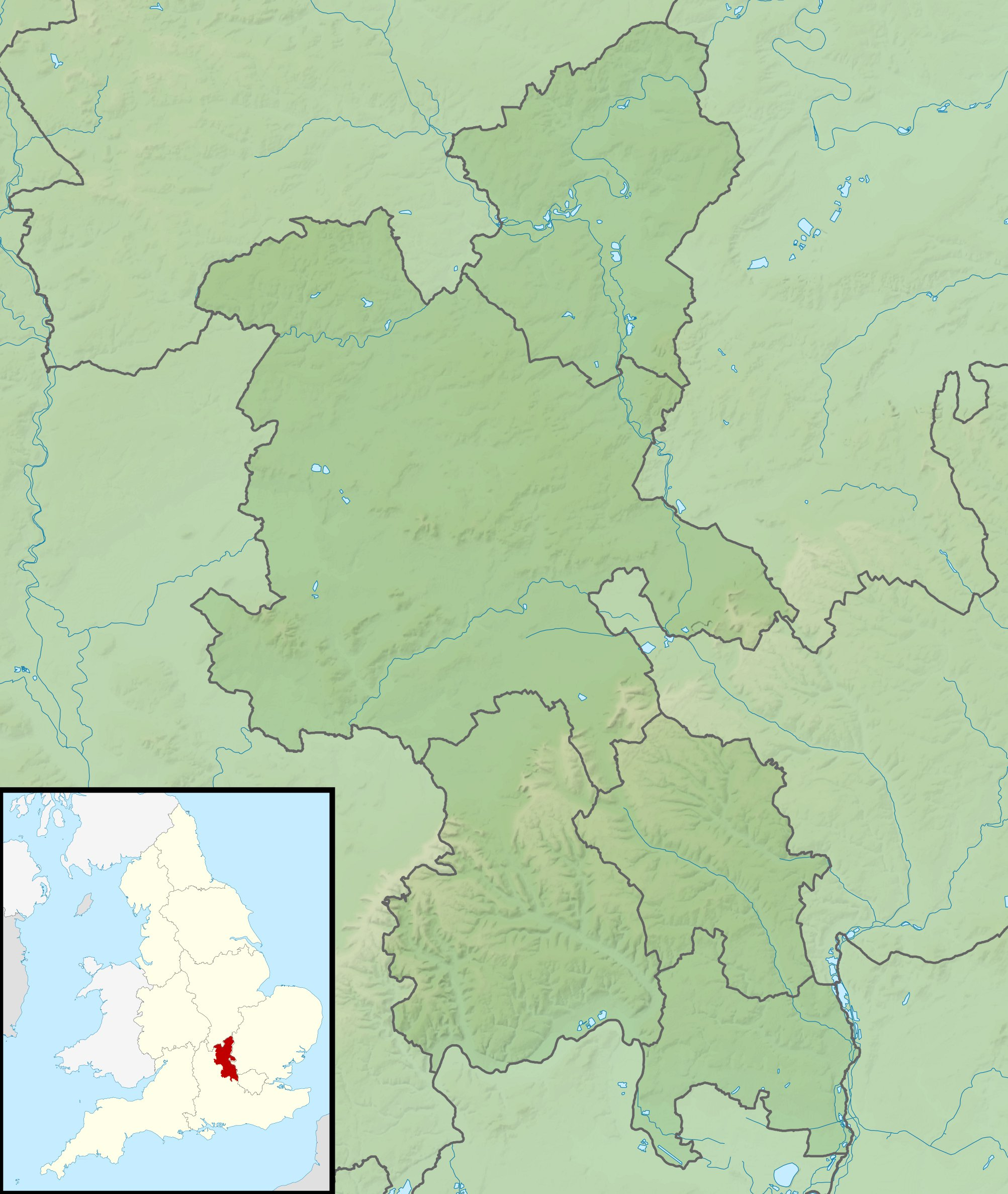
- Location within Buckinghamshire
- Location: Ivinghoe
- Parent range: Chiltern Hills
- OS grid: SP961168

Ivinghoe Beacon is a prominent hill and landmark in Buckinghamshire, England, 233 m (757 ft) above sea level in the Chiltern Hills, close to Ivinghoe and Aldbury. Dunstable, Berkhamsted and Tring are nearby.

The Beacon lies within the Ashridge Estate and is managed and owned by the National Trust. It is the starting point of the Icknield Way to the east, and the Ridgeway long-distance path to the west.

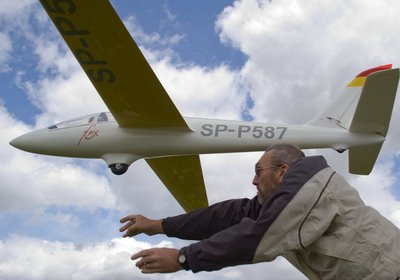
Flying model gliders at Ivinghoe Beacon

Ivinghoe Beacon is a popular spot for walkers and sightseers. Model aircraft enthusiasts also use lift generated by the wind blowing up the hill to fly their unpowered aircraft – a technique known as slope soaring.

== History ==
The hill is an ancient signal point, which was used in times of crisis to send messages across long distances. It is also the site of an early Iron Age hillfort protected as a scheduled monument.

Archaeological evidence has revealed human activity dating back to the Bronze Age, and the area contains many other scheduled Monuments, including a number of Bronze Age burial mounds and the faint remains of an Iron Age hillfort at the top of the hill. There also exists evidence of ancient farming as the Beacon is also crossed by deep channels which are thought to be cattle drovers' paths and cross-ridge dykes. The prehistoric earthwork, Grim's Ditch passes to the south of the Beacon at Incombe Hole.

== Nature ==
Ivinghoe Beacon is part of the Ivinghoe Hills Site of Special Scientific Interest and this area forms part of the Chilterns Area of Outstanding Natural Beauty (AONB).

The chalk grassland supports a range of wildlife. A number of wild flower species grow on the Beacon such as rare types of wild orchid and pasque-flower, and these support endangered butterfly species such as the Duke of Burgundy.

== Filming location ==
Ivinghoe Beacon's appearance of remoteness, yet relative proximity to the film studios at Pinewood Studios, Elstree and Leavesden, has made it a popular choice as a filming location. It has been used as a location for many dramas, especially those produced by ITC in the 1960s.

The Beacon has been used as a filming location in four Harry Potter films – Harry Potter and the Goblet of Fire, Harry Potter and the Half-Blood Prince, and Harry Potter and the Deathly Hallows – Part 1 and Part 2. The Beacon also appeared in BBC dramas Killing Eve and The Detectorists whilst also in the 2012 BBC adaptation of Richard II. In 2018 film crews shot scenes on Ivinghoe Beacon for the Star Wars movie The Rise of Skywalker.

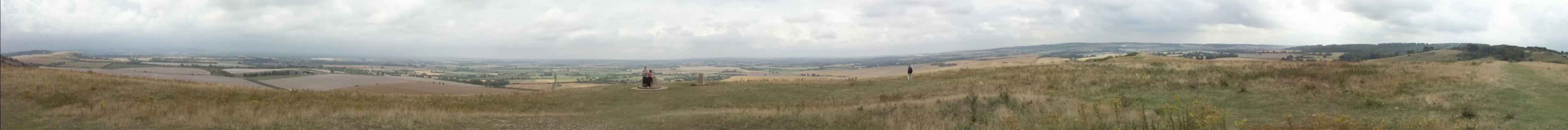
A full-circle panoramic view from Ivinghoe Beacon
