= St Cuthbert's Way =

Long-distance trail between Scotland and England

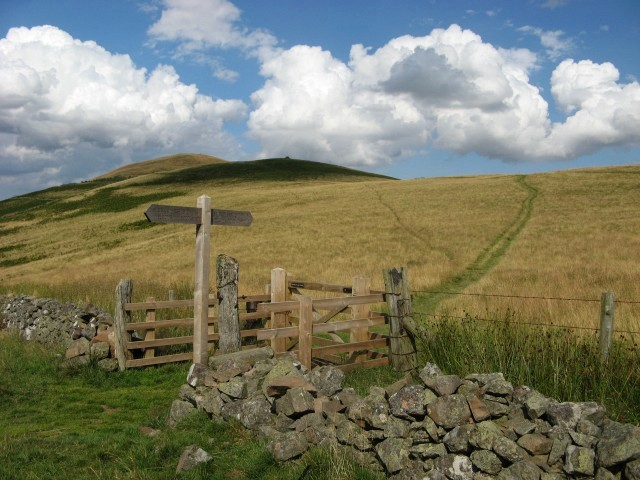
- St Cuthbert's Way at the Anglo-Scottish border
- Length: 100 kilometres (62 mi)
- Location: Scottish Borders/Northumberland
- Established: 1996
- Trailheads: Melrose (55°35′56″N 2°43′08″W); Lindisfarne (55°40′55″N 1°49′23″W)
- Use: Walking
- Elevation gain/loss: 2,075 metres (6,808 ft) gain
- Highest point: 368 m
- Season: All year
- Waymark: Yes
- Website: http://www.stcuthbertsway.info

St Cuthbert's Way is a 100-kilometre (62 mi) long-distance trail between the Scottish Borders town of Melrose and Lindisfarne (Holy Island) off the coast of Northumberland, England. The walk is named after Cuthbert, a 7th-century saint, a native of the Borders who spent his life in the service of the church. The route links Melrose Abbey, where Cuthbert began his religious life, with his initial burial place on Holy Island. Cuthbert achieved the status of bishop, and was called a saint eleven years after his death, when his coffin was opened and his remains found to be perfectly preserved.

The route was first devised by Ron Shaw, and opened in summer 1996. Shaw continues to sit on the walk's steering group, which is responsible for managing the path. Other members of this group are Scottish Borders Council, Northumberland County Council, Northumberland National Park, and Northumberland Coast Area of Outstanding Natural Beauty. The trail was originally developed as a walking route but some sections are suitable for cyclists and horseriders. The Scottish Outdoor Access Code permits cyclists and riders to use most of the trail in Scotland, but on the English section of the route this is generally not permitted. Similarly, wild camping along the route is permitted (if carried out responsibly) in Scotland, but not in England.

As of 2018 it was estimated that around 2,500 people completed the entire route each year.

== The route ==
=== In Scotland ===
Although the majority of walkers travel from west to east it can be as easily walked in the reverse direction with good waymarking in both directions. The route starts at Melrose Abbey. It first climbs over the Eildon Hills to the village of Bowden, then turns east to Newtown St Boswells on the River Tweed opposite Dryburgh Abbey. It then follows the bank of the Tweed for 3 miles (5 km) downstream past St Boswells to Maxton. Near Maxton the trail joins Dere Street, which it follows south east past the site of the Battle of Ancrum Moor to Monteviot House on the banks of the River Teviot.

From Monteviot Bridge the Way follows Dere Street for another 1 km, before striking east and climbing above the village of Crailing to reach Cessford. A short stretch of roadwalking follows to Morebattle, from where the trail leads south up the valley of Kale Water. 1 mile (1.6 km) south of Morebattle the Way climbs steeply to the ridge of Wideopen Hill, the highest point of the trail at 368 metres (1,207 ft), before descending to the villages of Town Yetholm and Kirk Yetholm, where it meets the Pennine Way.

The route in Scotland is part of the E2 European long distance path, which runs for 3,010 miles (4,850 km) from Galway to Nice.

=== In England ===
Posts mark the route of the Pilgrims’ Path which takes the trail across to Lindisfarne (Holy Island)

The border ridge is reached 2 miles (3 km) east of Kirk Yetholm. On the English side the trail descends through the Northumberland National Park to the village of Hethpool in the College Valley. The trail then climbs through the foothills of the Cheviot Hills, passing just south of the hillforts of Yeavering Bell and Humbleton Hill, to the town of Wooler.

From Wooler the Way ascends the valley of the River Till to the twin villages of West Horton and East Horton. It then follows farmland tracks to St. Cuthbert's Cave near Holburn. Near the cave it joins St Oswald's Way and the Northumberland Coast Path (part of the England Coast Path) to head north through Fenwick to the coast just east of Beal. The last section across the sands to Lindisfarne (Holy Island) can only be walked at low tide, either by the modern road or by the historic, more direct, Pilgrims’ Path, marked by posts.

== Connecting paths ==
The route is designated as one of Scotland's Great Trails by NatureScot, and links with two other Great Trails: the Borders Abbeys Way and the Southern Upland Way. In England, St Cuthbert's Way connects with the Pennine Way, one of the National Trails of England and Wales, but is not itself classified as National Trail. The Way also links to St Oswald's Way, the England Coast Path, the Roman Heritage Way and the Sir Walter Scott Way.

== In popular culture ==
It featured in series 8 of the BBC TV series Pilgrimage in 2026.
