= Clyde Coastal Path =

Walking route in western Scotland

- Length: 110 km (68 mi)
- Location: Scotland
- Established: 2014
- Trailheads: Milngavie – Kelly Burn (between Wemyss Bay and Skelmorlie)
- Use: Hiking, Walking, limited Cycling
- Highest point: 197 m (646 ft)
- Lowest point: 0 m (0 ft)
- Difficulty: Moderate
- Season: All year
- Maintained by: Rotary Club of Gourock (south of Erskine Bridge); Rotary Club of Allander (north of bridge)

The Clyde Coastal Path (Scottish Gaelic: Ceumcolsa Linne Chluaidh) is a long-distance walking route in western Scotland. Opened in 2014, it forms part of the wider Firth o Clyde Rotary Trail and links the Ayrshire Coastal Path with the West Highland Way, creating a continuous route from Scotland’s south-west coast to the Highlands.

== Route ==
The route extends for about 110 km (68 mi) between Milngavie in East Dunbartonshire and the Kelly Burn between Wemyss Bay and Skelmorlie. It follows a mixture of coastal promenades, estuary paths, and inland moorland tracks along the lower River Clyde corridor.

The path is divided into three main sections:

1. Section 1 – Wemyss Bay to Greenock: Two route options – a 25 km coastal route or a 20 km moorland route.
2. Section 2 – Greenock to Erskine Bridge: Approximately 26 km following the Clyde estuary through Port Glasgow and Langbank.
3. Section 3 – Erskine Bridge to Milngavie: Roughly 14 km via Hardgate and Duntocher, finishing at Milngavie.

A circular walk of about 45 km can be achieved by combining both the high and low routes of Section 1.

== Spurs and connections ==
Two spurs complement the main route:

- The Partick Spur (19 km) runs from Boden Boo at the Erskine Bridge to Partick railway station, connecting with the Clyde Walkway.
- The Paisley Spur (5 km) links the River Cart to Paisley Abbey, joining the Scotland’s Pilgrims’ Way.

Including both spurs, the total network length is nearly 110 km.

== Development and maintenance ==
The path was created by members of Rotary International District 1320 (Scotland South).

- The Rotary Club of Gourock maintains the section south of the Erskine Bridge.
- The Rotary Club of Allander (Bearsden and Milngavie) maintains the northern section.
- The spurs are maintained by the Rotary Clubs of Erskine, Govan, Paisley Callants, and Renfrew.

The launch of the Clyde Coastal Path completed the Firth o Clyde Rotary Trail (FoCRT), which also includes the Mull of Galloway Trail and the Ayrshire Coastal Path. Together these trails form part of the International Appalachian Trail Scotland network.

== Signage and guidebook ==
The entire route is sign-posted with directional markers containing QR codes for location information. A printed guidebook provides full coverage:

- Cuddihy, Vincent (2018). Clyde Coastal Path – A Guidebook. Edited by Iain R. White. Photographs by Photoscot. Preface by Sally Magnusson. Gourock: Clyde Coastal Path Board. ISBN 978-1845003005. OCLC 1099478973.

The book includes detailed directions, nature notes, and points of historical interest.

== Related routes ==
- Ayrshire Coastal Path – southern continuation from Wemyss Bay
- West Highland Way – northern continuation from Milngavie
- Great Glen Way and Cape Wrath Trail – further long-distance links northward
- Clyde Walkway – via the Partick Spur
- Scotland’s Pilgrims’ Way – via the Paisley Spur

== See also ==
- Scottish Coastal Way
- Long-distance footpaths in Scotland
