= Tibbie Shiel =

Scottish inn keeper

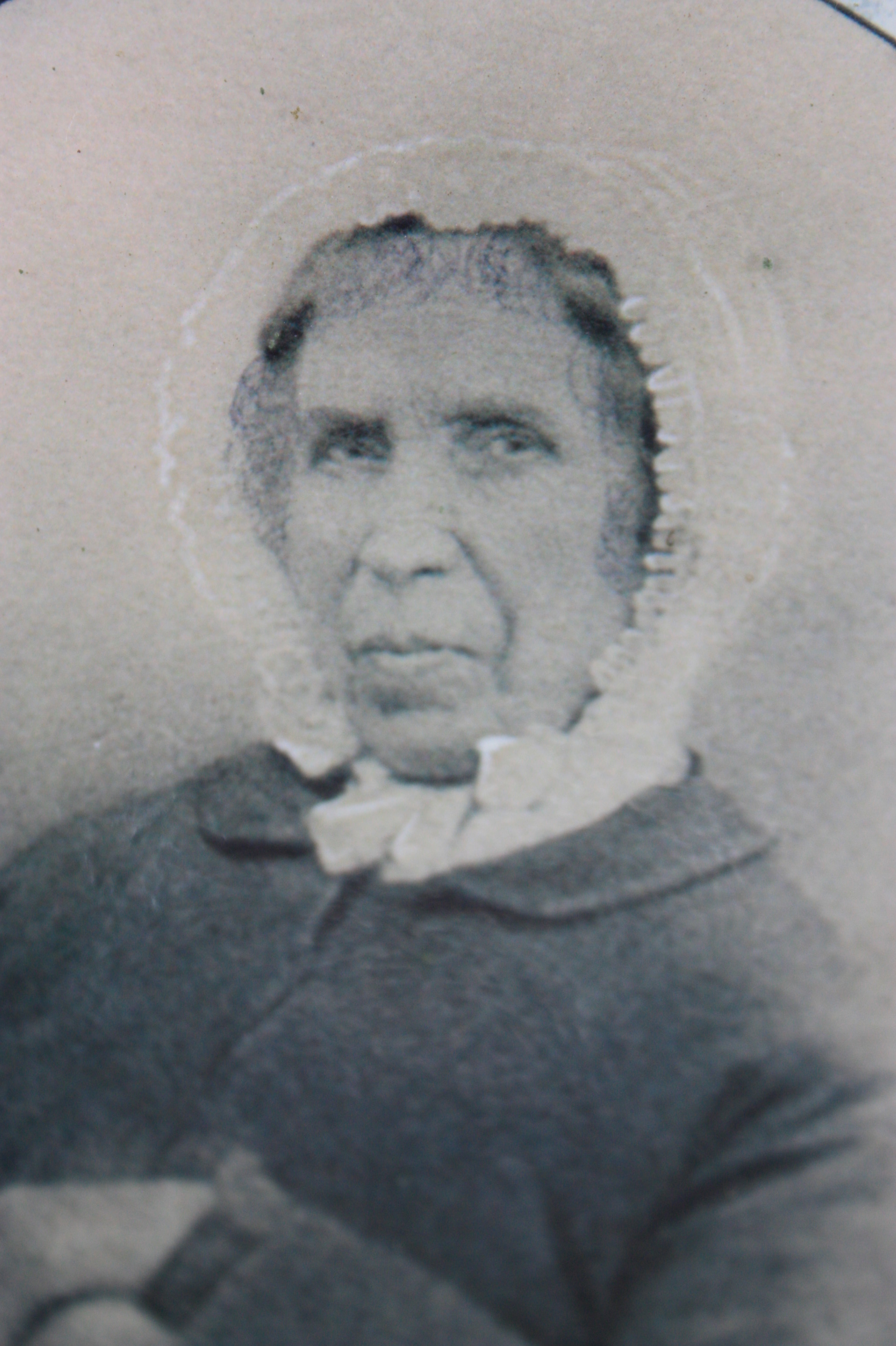
Tibbie Shiel 1875

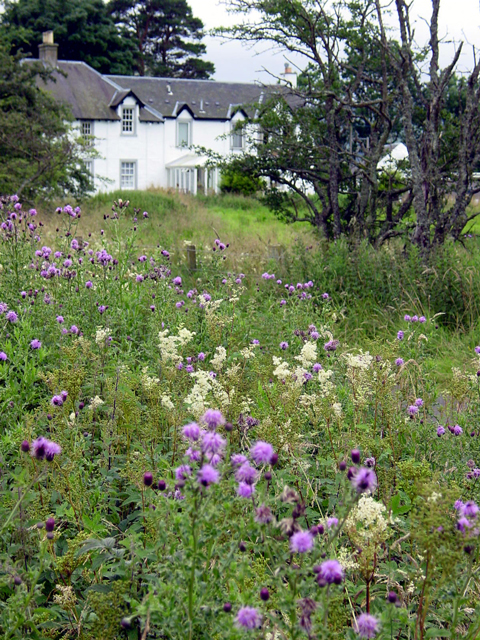
Tibbie Shiel's Inn from the meadow to the east

Tibbie Shiel (1783–1878) was a Scottish inn keeper who ran Tibbie Shiel's Inn on St Mary's Loch in the Scottish Borders and was known to many authors and poets, and the subject of numerous literary works.

== Life ==
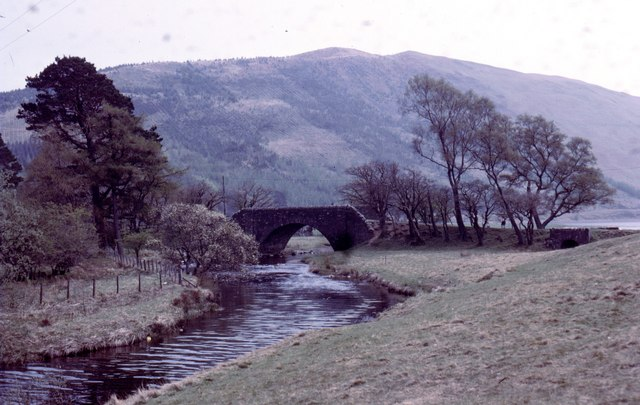
The bridge to Tibbie Shiel's Inn

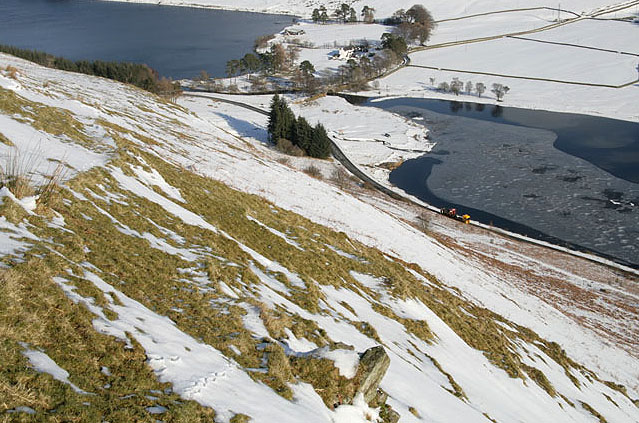
Tibbie Shiels Inn as seen from the hills in winter

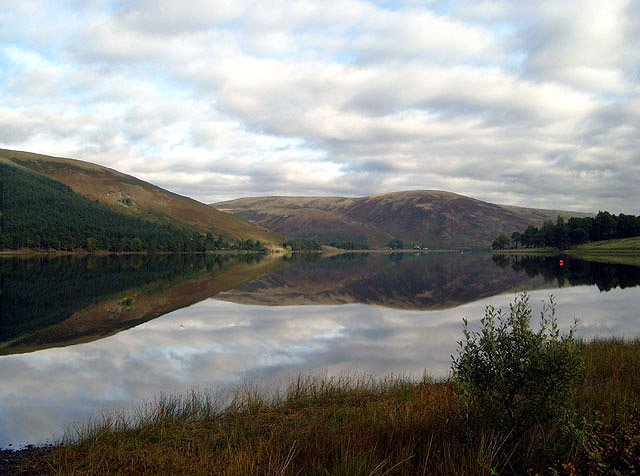
The view of St Mary's Loch from the Inn

She was born Isabella Shiel in 1783, in Ettrick to Walter Shiel and his wife Mary. She was generally known by the pet name "Tibbie". She received only basic schooling and was employed generally on farm work in the Scottish Borders including working on the Ettrick sheep farm of Robert Hogg (1729–1820), where she certainly first encountered his son, James Hogg, later to become a famous poet.

In 1806 she married Robert Richardson, a molecatcher by trade. They had three sons and three daughters. In 1823 the family moved to the idyllic spot of St Mary's Cottage at the south end of St Mary's Loch. The lands were owned by Lord Napier. Her husband died in 1824, soon after the move, and Tibbie was forced to support her family by taking in travellers. As the house stood close to the old coach road from Selkirk to Moffat, in an appealing location, this proved successful.

The inn served ale and food and had 13 guest bedrooms. Its fame quickly grew for its hospitality and the beauty of its surroundings. Although occasionally referenced as "Mrs Richardson" she was generally known by her maiden name, Tibbie Shiel.

As a close friend of James Hogg she said of him "he wrote a deal of trash but was a sensible man".

Her son William ("Wullie") Shiel lived with her in her old age at the Inn, and appears with her in 19th century postcards.

She died on 23 July 1878 at age 95. She is buried near her parents in Ettrick churchyard to the south-east. Her ghost allegedly haunts the inn.

== Modern survival of the Inn ==
The old coach road is now the A708. It is supplemented by the Southern Upland Way and so is a frequent calling point for hikers.

In 1985 a dinner at the inn marked the 150th anniversary of James Hogg's death.

From 1986 to 2007 the Inn was run by Jill Brown.

Since 2008 the Inn has been owned by the Moody family.

In 2015 the family threatened to close the Inn due to anti-social behaviour from a nearby campsite. The inn is currently (2018) closed to the public.

== Known visitors ==
- James Hogg (frequent)
- Sir Walter Scott
- William Wordsworth
- Robert Louis Stevenson
- Thomas Carlyle and his wife Jane Welsh Carlyle
- Thomas Stoddart
- William Gladstone
- Robert Chambers
- Christopher North

Less reliable sources state that Robert Burns was a visitor, but as Burns died in 1796 this is physically impossible.

== Literary recognition ==
Many of Christopher North's 71 Noctes Ambrosianae in Blackwood's Magazine mention Tibbie Shiel's Inn and St Mary's Loch, and did much to further promote its fame.

Robert Chambers' "Picture of Scotland" (1827) also recommends the Inn.

Hogg refers to it in multiple works and his statue now stands nearby overlooking the loch.
