= Northumberland Coast Path =

Footpath in Northumberland, England

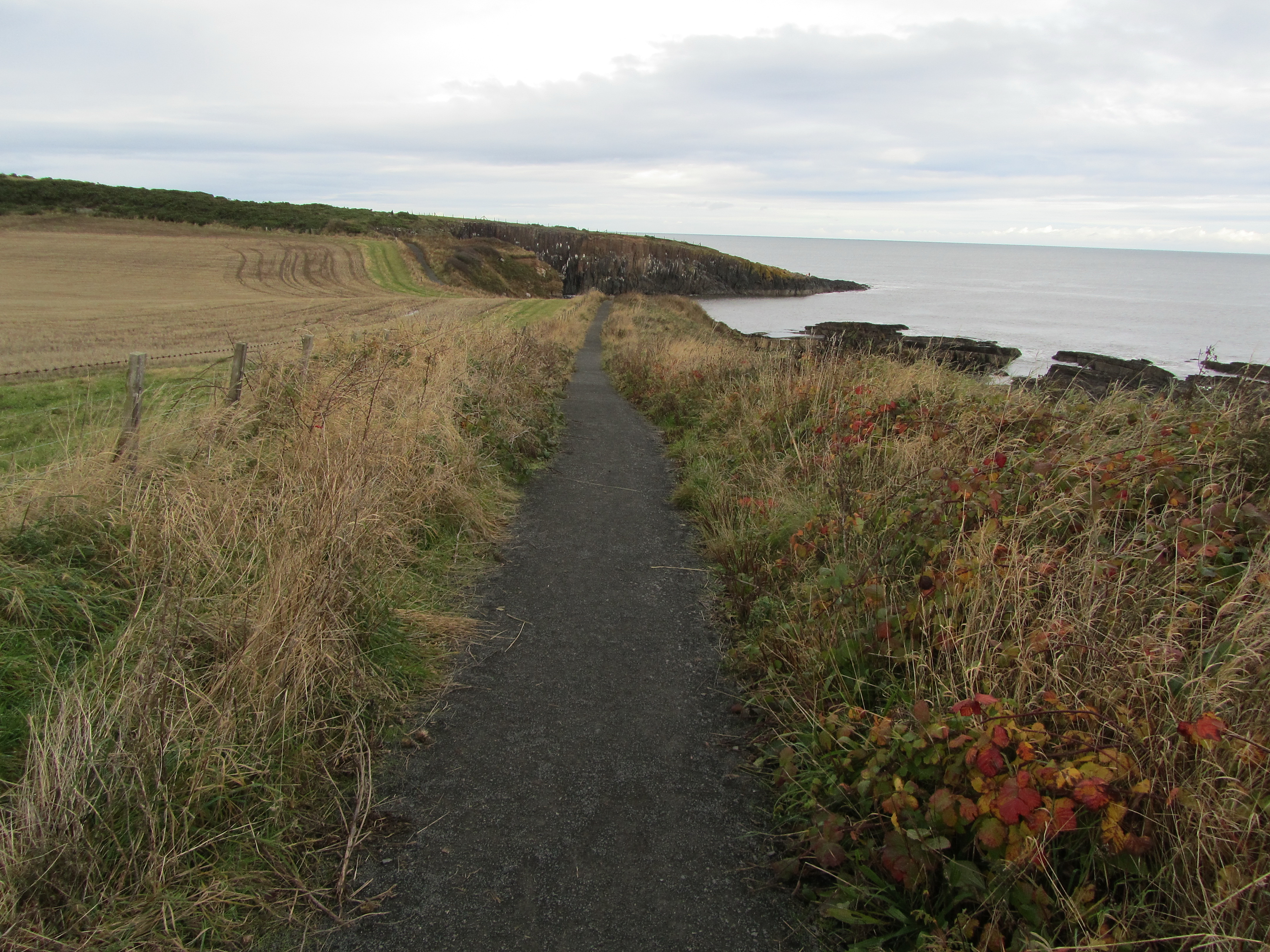
- Northumberland Coast Path heading to Cullernose Point
- Length: 101 km (63 mi)
- Location: Northumberland, England
- Trailheads: Cresswell; Berwick-upon-Tweed
- Use: Hiking
- Season: All year

The Northumberland Coast Path is a long distance path in Northumberland in northern England. It now forms part of the England Coast Path.

The path starts at Cresswell and then heads north along the coast through Amble and Warkworth, where it is joined by St Oswald's Way. It continues north to Alnmouth and Craster, past Dunstanburgh Castle to Seahouses and Bamburgh Castle. It then heads inland to Belford and the Kyloe Hills, which offer panoramic views of the coast and the Cheviot Hills. From here it joins St. Cuthbert's Way and returns to the coast at the causeway to Holy Island before continuing along sandy beaches and cliff-top paths to the River Tweed and Berwick-upon-Tweed, close to the Scottish border.

The path is part of the European North Sea Trail. At Berwick the path links with the Berwickshire Coastal Path and so with the proposed Scottish Coastal Way.

The path is managed by the Northumberland Coast Area of Outstanding Natural Beauty.
