= Roman Heritage Way =

Long-distance footpath in England and Scotland

The Roman Heritage Way is a long-distance path in England and Scotland. It covers parts of Cumbria, Northumberland, the Scottish Borders, and Tyneside.

The Way was developed from sections of the Hadrian's Wall Path, the Pennine Way, Dere Street, the St. Cuthbert's Way, and a set of Core Paths around Newtown St Boswells and Melrose.

Three main options present themselves to the walker:

- Segedunum to Trimontium (Wallsend to Melrose)
- Maia Fort to Trimontium (Bowness-on-Solway to Melrose)
- Segedunum to Maia Fort (Wallsend to Bowness-on-Solway): Complete length of Hadrian's wall, with a range of Roman forts, museums and exhibitions.

== See also ==
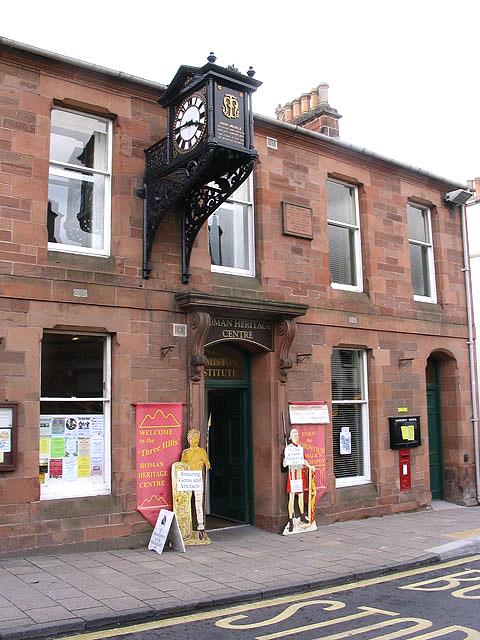
The Roman Heritage Centre in Melrose

- Borders Abbeys Way
- Central Scottish Way
- James Hutton Trail
- Pennine Way National Trail
- St Cuthbert's Way
- Sir Walter Scott Way
- Southern Upland Way
