= Longformacus =

Village in Scottish Borders, Scotland

Coordinates: 55.808°N 2.492°W

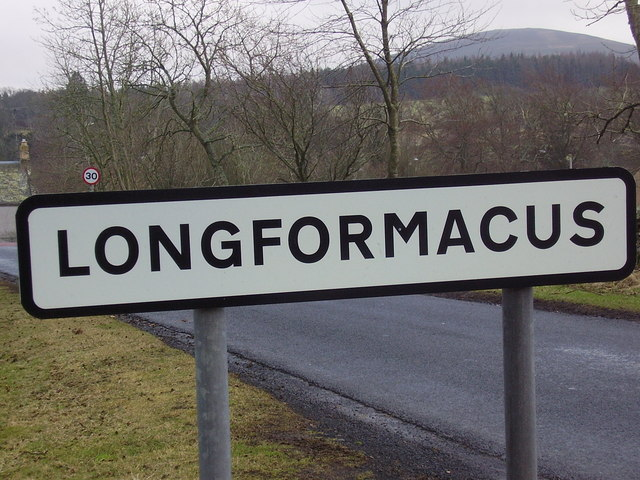
- entering the village

- Location within the Scottish Borders
- OS grid reference: NT693572
- Council area: Scottish Borders
- Lieutenancy area: Berwickshire
- Country: Scotland
- Sovereign state: United Kingdom
- Post town: DUNS
- Postcode district: TD11
- Police: Scotland
- Fire: Scottish
- Ambulance: Scottish
- UK Parliament: Berwickshire, Roxburgh and Selkirk
- Scottish Parliament: Ettrick, Roxburgh and Berwickshire

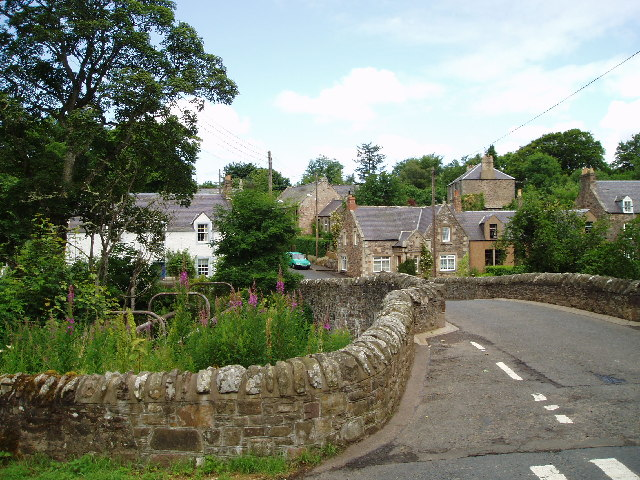
Longformacus

Longformacus (Scottish Gaelic: Longphort Mhacais) is a small village in Berwickshire in the Scottish Borders area of Scotland. It is around 10 kilometres (6.2 mi) north-west of Duns, in the Lammermuir Hills. The Dye Water runs through the village, flowing east towards its confluence with the Whiteadder Water nearby.

In the vicinity are traces of an ancient fortification at Runklie or Wrinklaw and the Mutiny Stones cairn.

The opera Lucia di Lammermoor, written by Gaetano Donizetti and based on Sir Walter Scott's The Bride of Lammermoor, was set in the Lammermuirs and an old form of the village's name, Lockermachus, is mentioned in Scott's novel.

The Southern Upland Way, a Long Distance Route which crosses southern Scotland, passes through the village, and the Sir Walter Scott Way from Moffat to Cockburnspath passes through Longformacus.

== Etymology ==
Longformacus derives its name from the Gaelic Longphort Mhacais, meaning 'Macas's camp'. Derivation from Lann Fothir Maccus, meaning 'church on the land of Maccus' has also been suggested.

== History ==
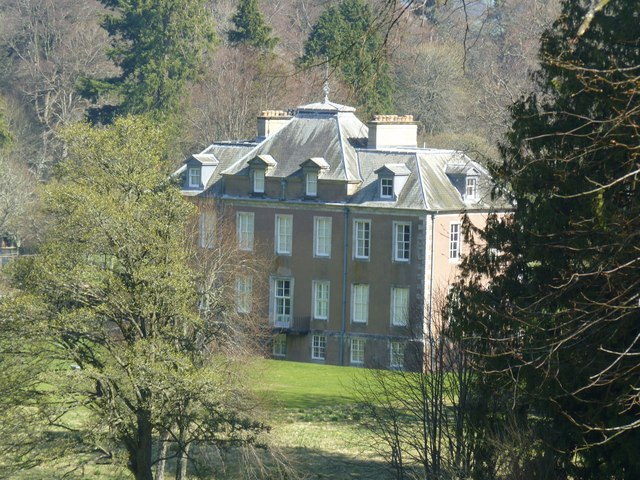
The Mansion House of Longformacus

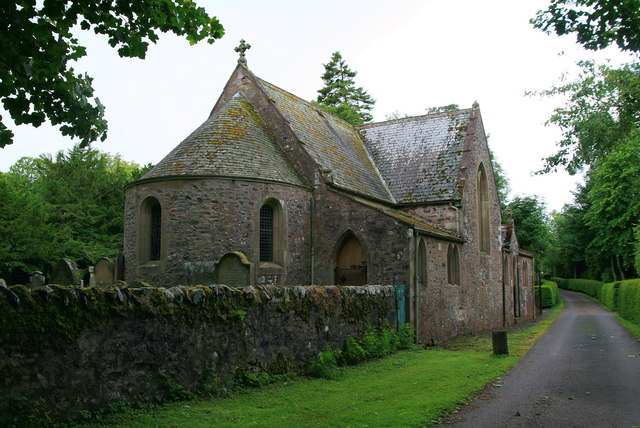
Longformacus Church

The church of Longformacus was dedicated by Bishop David de Bernham, 11 March 1243. In 1667 the choir was in ruins, the church itself being "very ruinous." It was rebuilt on the old foundations in 1730, and a thorough renovation was made, in 1895. Our Lady's Well is on the Dye Water, about a quarter of a mile east of the village. The parish was long united to Mordington, but was disjoined in 1666. Longformacus and Ellem were united in 1712; and Ellem church was disused. There was some copper ore in the area which a former minister smelted but large scale production was not successful.

== People from Longformacus ==
- Prof Alexander Christison FRSE
- Thomas Ord, circus horseman, son of the Longformacus minister.

== See also ==
Places nearby include Cranshaws, Abbey St Bathans, Bonkle, Preston, Scottish Borders, the Whiteadder Water, and Duns.

- List of listed buildings in Longformacus, Scottish Borders
- List of places in the Scottish Borders
- List of places in Scotland
