= Borders Abbeys Way =

Footpath amongst historical sites in Scotland

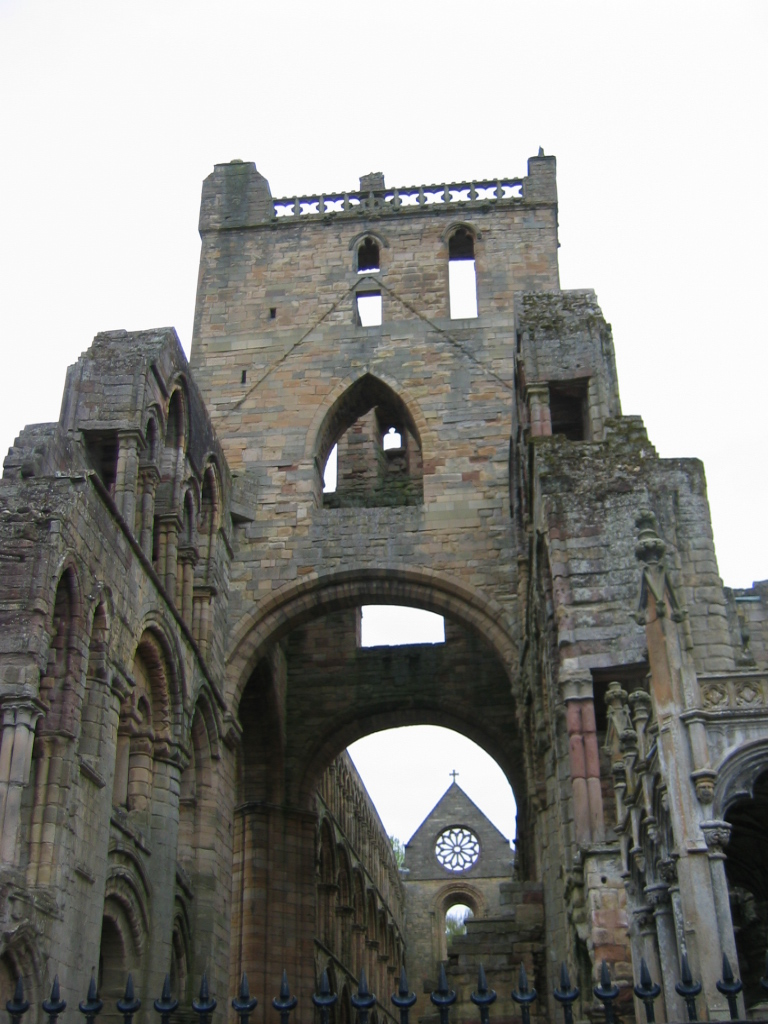
- Jedburgh Abbey
- Length: 109 km (68 mi)
- Location: Borders, Scotland
- Established: 2006
- Designation: Scotland's Great Trails
- Trailheads: Circular
- Use: Hiking
- Elevation gain/loss: 1,300 metres (4,300 ft) gain
- Highest point: 339 metres (1,113 ft)
- Season: All year
- Sights: Historic ruined abbeys, rivers, wildlife, countryside
- Website: http://www.bordersabbeysway.com/

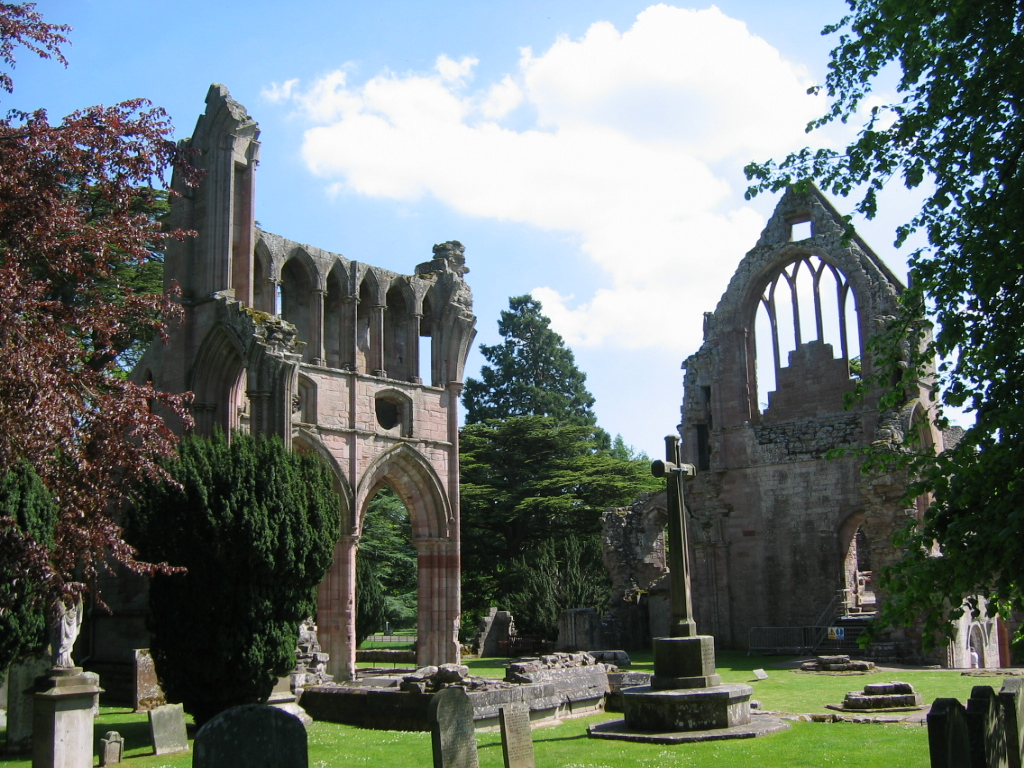
Dryburgh Abbey

The Borders Abbeys Way is a long-distance footpath in the Scottish Borders area of Scotland. It is a circular walkway and is 109 kilometres (68 mi) in length. The theme of the footpath is the ruined Borders abbeys (established by David I of Scotland) along its way: Kelso Abbey, Jedburgh Abbey, Melrose Abbey and Dryburgh Abbey. These abbeys were homes to monks, who lived there between the 12th and 16th centuries. The route also passes through the towns of Hawick and Selkirk, and close to Abbotsford House, the home of Sir Walter Scott. Along the Borders Abbeys Way there are several rivers: Jed Water, River Teviot, River Tweed, Ale Water, and Rule Water.

The route was opened in 2006, and is managed and maintained by Scottish Borders Council. It is now designated as one of Scotland's Great Trails by NatureScot. The route links with four of the other Great Trails: the Cross Borders Drove Road, the Romans and Reivers Route, St Cuthbert's Way and the·Southern Upland Way. About 15,000 people use the path every year, of whom over 2,000 complete the entire route.

== Sections of the Walk ==
Most people choose to do the walk in one day for each segment.

Start	Finish	Distance		Start elevation		Finish elevation		Highest point	
Start	Finish	km	mi	m	ft	m	ft	m	ft
Kelso (55.5970°N 2.4327°W)	Jedburgh	19	12	41	134	85	280	120	390
Jedburgh (55.4766°N 2.5541°W)	Hawick	20	12	85	280	105	344	300	985
Hawick (55.4285°N 2.7833°W)	Selkirk	20	12	102	334	172	564	339	1,113
Selkirk(55.5471°N 2.8415°W)	Melrose	16	9.9	172	564	98	320	270	880
Melrose(55.5990°N 2.7191°W)	Kelso	28	17	98	320	41	134	148	485
Complete walk		103	64					339	1,113

== See also ==
- Pennine Way National Trail
- James Hutton Trail
- Roman Heritage Way
- Sir Walter Scott Way
