= St Mary's Loch =

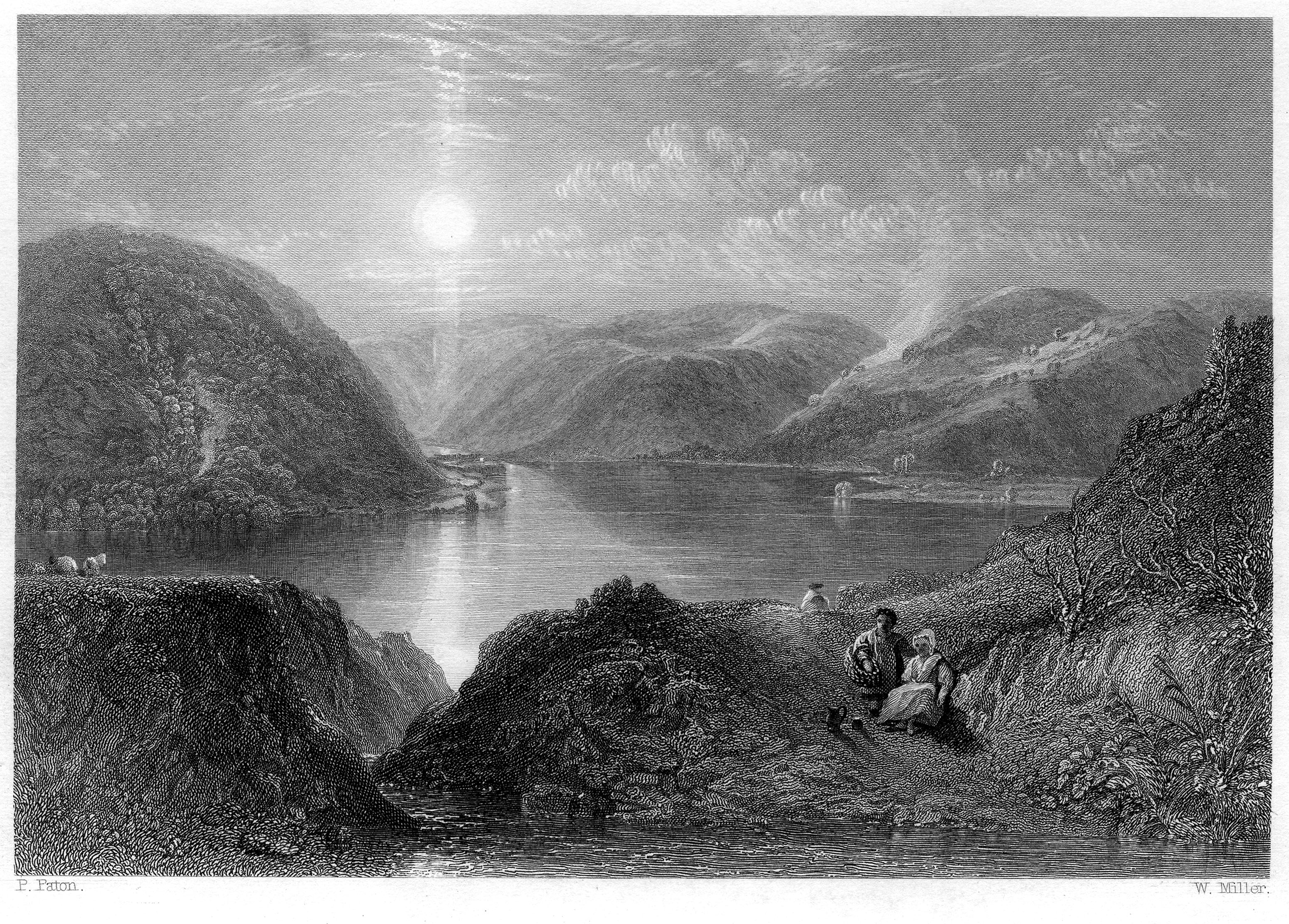
- 1845 engraving by William Miller after P. Paton

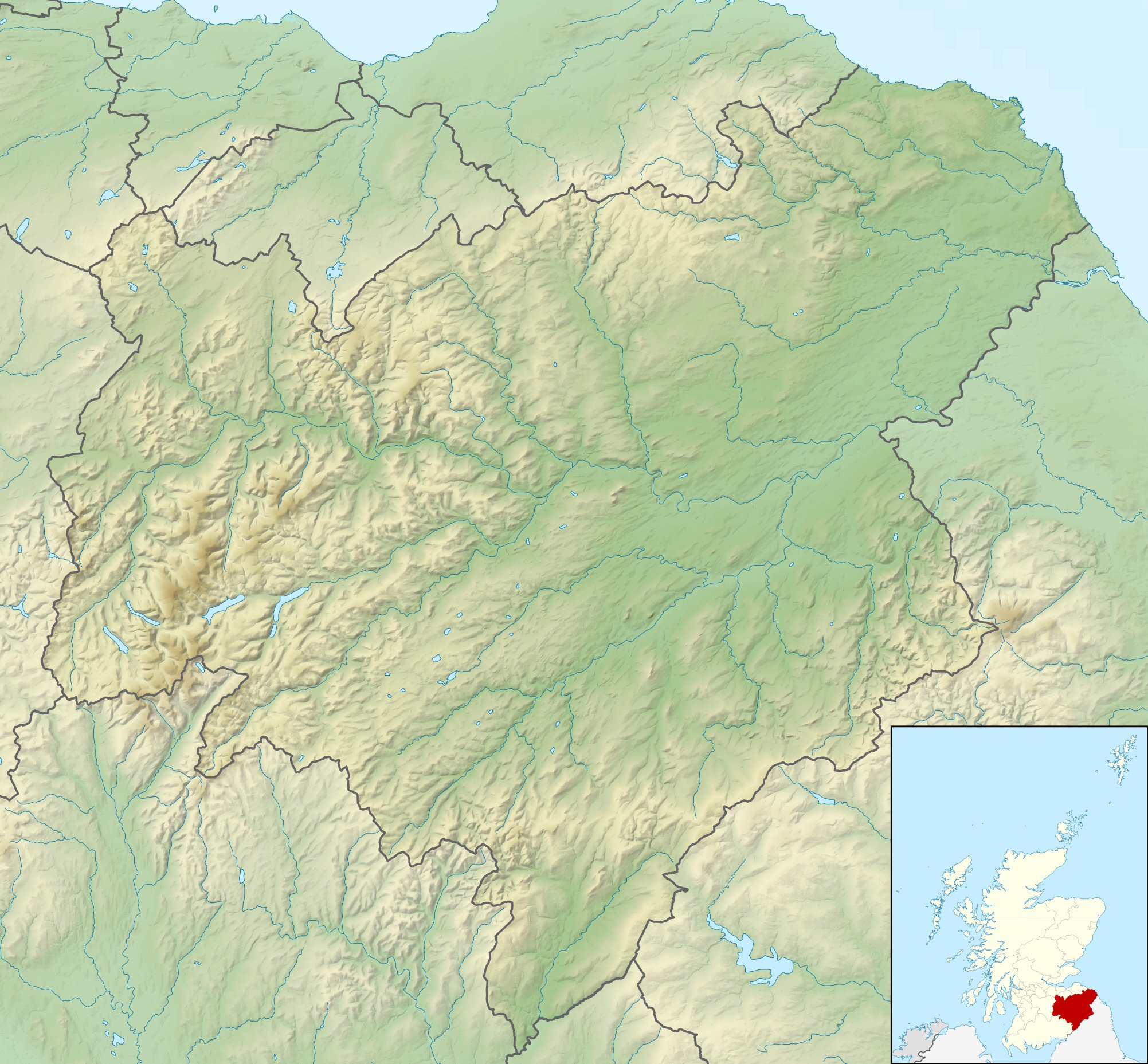
- Location within Scottish Borders
- Location: Borders
- Coordinates: 55°29′40″N 3°11′10″W
- Type: freshwater loch
- Basin countries: Scotland
- Max. length: 5 kilometres (3.1 mi)
- Max. width: 1 kilometre (0.62 mi)

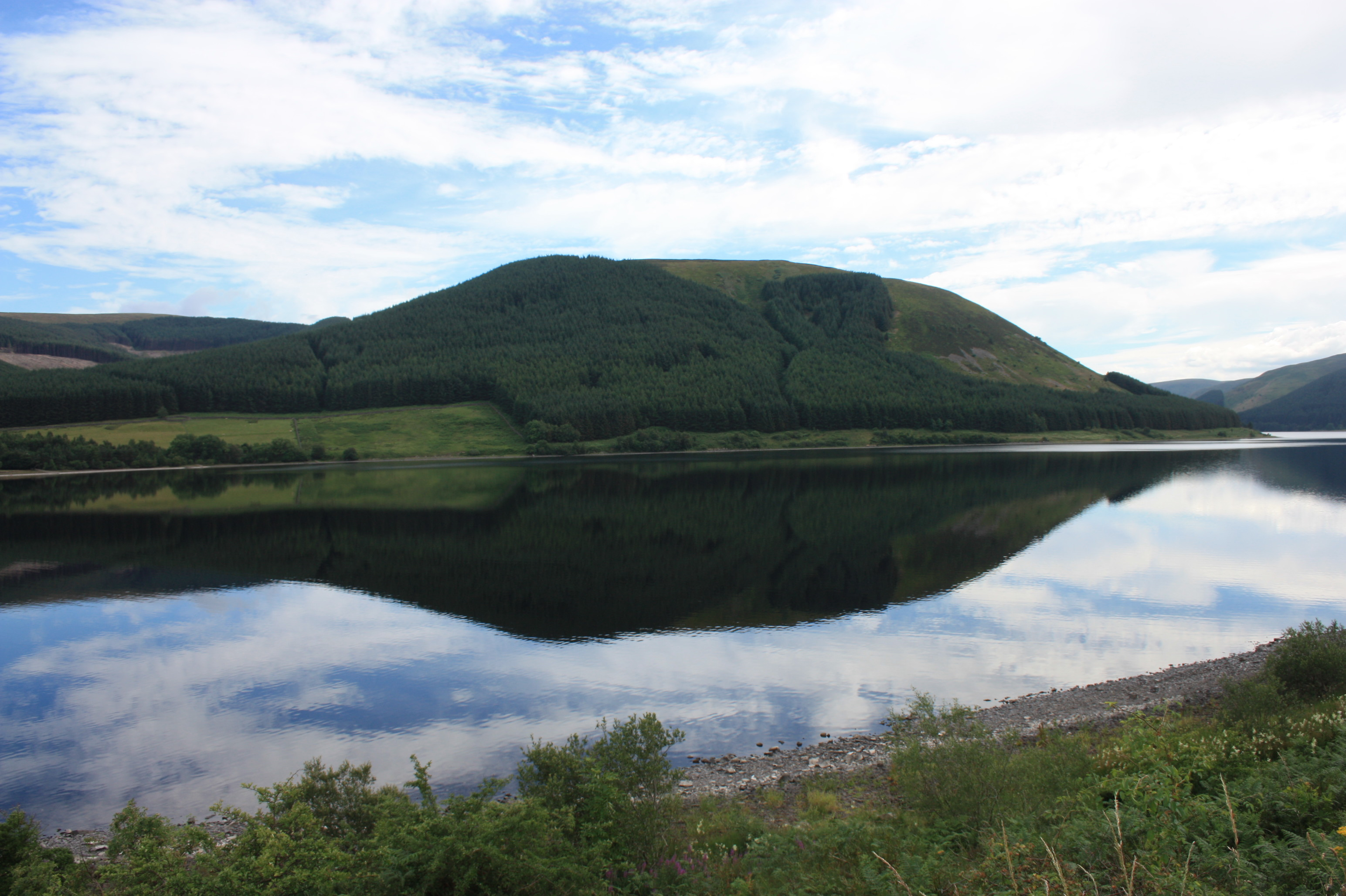
St Mary's Loch near Selkirk from the west bank

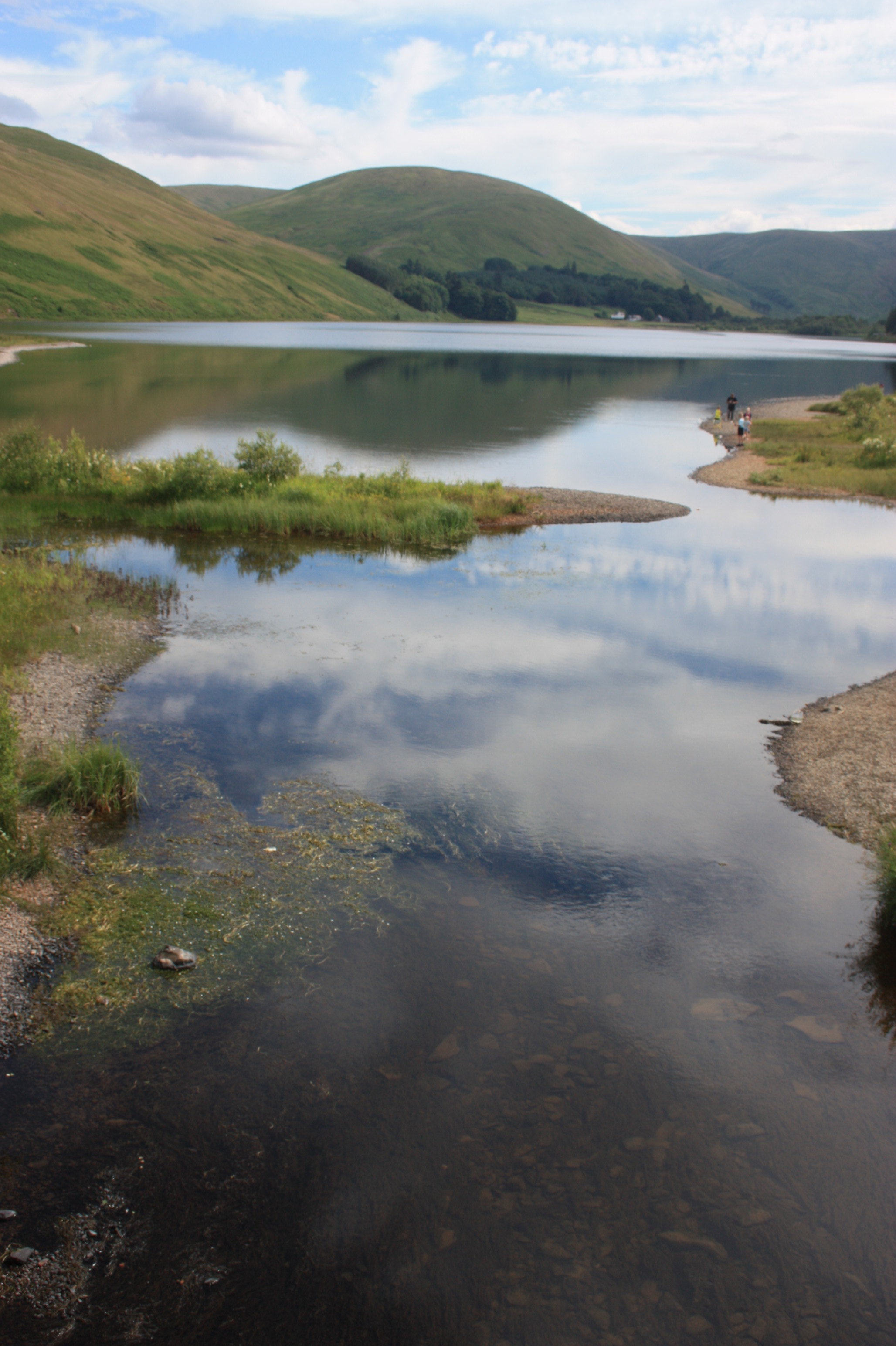
Loch of the Lowes from the Bridge to Tibbie Shiels

St Mary's Loch is the largest natural loch in the Scottish Borders, and is situated on the south side of the A708 road between Selkirk and Moffat, about 72 kilometres (45 mi) south of Edinburgh.

== Description ==
It is 5 kilometres (3.1 mi) long and 1 kilometre (0.62 mi) wide, and was created by glacial action during the last ice age. The loch is fed by the Megget Water, which flows in from the Megget Reservoir, and is the source of the Yarrow Water, which flows east from the loch to merge with the Ettrick Water above Selkirk.

It connects by a short section of river to the Loch of the Lowes, immediately to the south. Between the two, connected by an old arched bridge, is Tibbie Shiel's Inn, an 18th-century coaching inn, which was frequented by the Border poet James Hogg (1770–1835). The inn is now privately owned.

A statue of James Hogg is located opposite the turning to the former inn.

The loch takes its name from a church dedicated to St Mary which once stood on its northern shore, although only the burial ground is now visible. The loch is around 27 metres deep at its centre. As the loch is sheltered by steep hills on all sides it is often very still, providing excellent reflections in its waters.

The Southern Upland Way and Sir Walter Scott Way long-distance walking routes both pass the shores of the loch. The small settlement of Cappercleuch is located at the north-west corner of the loch.

== Sport ==
St Mary's Loch Sailing Club (StMLSC) is run from premises at the south end of the loch (east of Tibbie Shiels). It is affiliated to the Royal Yachting Association. Brown trout, pike, perch and eels are all found within the loch and its smaller neighbour, Loch of the Lowes. Arctic charr once also populated the loch but exploitation likely led to their disappearance before the mid-18th century.

== Literary references ==
Many of the 71 Noctes Ambrosianae in Blackwood's Magazine refer to Tibbie Shiel's Inn and St Mary's Loch. Tibbie Shiel a.k.a. Tibbie Richardson died in 1878 aged 95. Also mentioned in William Wordsworth's poem, "Yarrow Unvisited":

The swan on still St. Mary's Lake
Float double, swan and shadow!

== See also ==
- List of places in the Scottish Borders
- List of places in Scotland
