= List of listed buildings in Longformacus, Scottish Borders =

This is a list of listed buildings in the parish of Longformacus in the Scottish Borders, Scotland.

== List ==
Name	Location	Date Listed	Grid Ref. (Note: Sometimes known as OSGB36, the grid reference (where provided) is based on the British national grid reference system used by the Ordnance Survey. • "Guide to National Grid". Ordnance Survey. • "Get-a-map". Ordnance Survey.)	Geo-coordinates	Notes	LB Number (Note: Historic Environment Scotland assign a unique alphanumeric identifier to each designated site in Scotland, for listed buildings this always begins with "LB", for example "LB12345".)	Image
Whitchester House, Main Entrance Including Quadrant Walls, Railings, Piers, Gatepiers, Gates And Turning Point				55°49′26″N 2°26′52″W	Category B	45634	Upload Photo
Horseupcleuch Farmhouse Including Boundary Walls				55°49′10″N 2°32′04″W	Category C(S)	45618	Upload Photo
The Millhouse Including Garden Walls, Gatepiers And Gates				55°48′28″N 2°29′45″W	Category C(S)	45624	Upload another image
Riverside Cottage Including Boundary Wall				55°48′28″N 2°29′31″W	Category C(S)	45626	Upload Photo
4 The Row Including Cobbled Pavement, Nt 6928 5731				55°48′29″N 2°29′30″W	Category C(S)	45627	Upload Photo
Woodside Cottage Including Sundial				55°49′52″N 2°25′58″W	Category C(S)	10781	Upload Photo
Longformacus House Including Ancillary Structures, Courtyard Gatepiers, Quadrant Walls, Railings, Gatepiers And Gates				55°48′29″N 2°29′13″W	Category A	8344	Upload another image See more images
13 The Row, Gardener's Cottage Including Cobbled Pavement, Nt 6933 5734				55°48′30″N 2°29′27″W	Category C(S)	45633	Upload Photo
Caldra Farmhouse Including Garden Walls				55°48′24″N 2°28′36″W	Category C(S)	45616	Upload Photo
Longformacus Bridge				55°48′27″N 2°29′29″W	Category C(S)	10778	Upload Photo
6 The Row Including Cobbled Pavement, Nt 6931 5733				55°48′29″N 2°29′29″W	Category C(S)	45630	Upload Photo
12 The Row Including Cobbled Pavement, Nt 6932 5733				55°48′30″N 2°29′28″W	Category C(S)	45631	Upload Photo
Achray Cottage				55°48′24″N 2°29′26″W	Category C(S)	45615	Upload Photo
Craigie Lodge Including Ancillary Structures, Boundary Walls And Gates				55°48′31″N 2°30′07″W	Category C(S)	45617	Upload Photo
The Lodge, Longformacus House				55°48′22″N 2°29′24″W	Category C(S)	45621	Upload Photo
Longformacus House, Walled Garden Including Greenhouse, Sundials, Piers, Stair And Gates				55°48′32″N 2°29′23″W	Category B	45623	Upload Photo
5 The Row Including Cobbled Pavement, Nt 6930 5732				55°48′29″N 2°29′29″W	Category C(S)	45629	Upload Photo
Ellemhaugh Smithy Including House, Ancillary Structure (Former Hen House, Byre And Stable) And Former Smithy				55°49′44″N 2°26′48″W	Category C(S)	10782	Upload Photo
Longformacus Church (Church Of Scotland) Including Lampstand, Graveyard And Boundary Walls				55°48′28″N 2°29′23″W	Category B	8343	Upload another image See more images
Whitchester House, Walled Garden Including Stair, Gatepiers And Gate, Greenhouses, Outer Wall And Gatepiers				55°49′23″N 2°26′58″W	Category B	45635	Upload Photo
The Row, Dye Neuk Including Cobbled Pavement, Nt 6929 5732				55°48′29″N 2°29′29″W	Category C(S)	45628	Upload Photo
Kettleshiel Farm Including Farmhouse, Former Cattle Court, Garden Walls, Ancillary Structures And Boundary Walls				55°45′33″N 2°28′24″W	Category B	45620	Upload Photo
Longformacus House, Dovecot				55°48′32″N 2°29′14″W	Category A	8345	Upload another image
Ellem Lodge Including Boundary Walls, Gatepiers And Gates				55°49′54″N 2°26′03″W	Category B	8346	Upload Photo
Byrecleuch, Former Beater's Cottage, Originally Associated With Old Shooting Lodge				55°48′51″N 2°35′43″W	Category C(S)	8348	Upload Photo
The Row, The Honey House Including Cobbled Pavement, Nt 6932 5734				55°48′30″N 2°29′28″W	Category C(S)	45632	Upload Photo
Horseupcleuch Farm Steading Including Former Millhouse, Former Farmhouse And Shepherd's Cottage				55°49′13″N 2°32′05″W	Category C(S)	45619	Upload Photo
Redpath Farmhouse Including Boundary Walls				55°49′42″N 2°29′48″W	Category C(S)	45625	Upload Photo
1 The Row Including Cobbled Pavement, Nt 6927 5729				55°48′28″N 2°29′31″W	Category C(S)	10779	Upload Photo

== Key ==
The scheme for classifying buildings in Scotland is:

- Category A: "buildings of national or international importance, either architectural or historic; or fine, little-altered examples of some particular period, style or building type."
- Category B: "buildings of regional or more than local importance; or major examples of some particular period, style or building type, which may have been altered."
- Category C: "buildings of local importance; lesser examples of any period, style, or building type, as originally constructed or moderately altered; and simple traditional buildings which group well with other listed buildings."

In March 2016 there were 47,288 listed buildings in Scotland. Of these, 8% were Category A, and 50% were Category B, with the remaining 42% being Category C.
