= Romans and Reivers Route =

Long-distance path in southern Scotland

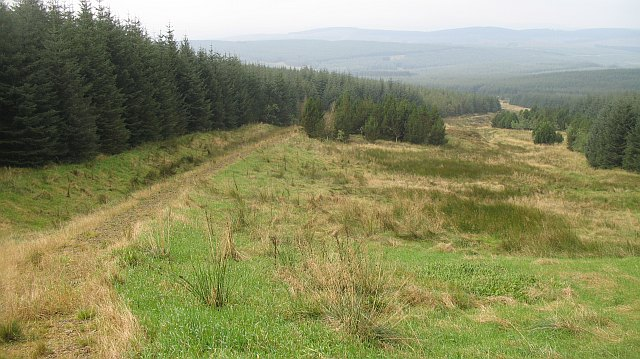
- The Romans and Reivers Route follows an old Roman road at Craik Roman signal station.
- Length: 84 km (52 mi)
- Location: Dumfries and Galloway and Scottish Borders, Scotland
- Designation: Scotland's Great Trails
- Trailheads: Forest of Ae55.195°N 3.599°W; Hawick55.422°N 2.825°W
- Use: Walking, cycling and horseriding
- Elevation gain/loss: 1,695 metres (5,561 ft) gain
- Waymark: Yes
- Website: http://www.southofscotlandcountrysidetrails.co.uk/where-to-ride/romans-and-reivers-route/

The Romans and Reivers Route is a long-distance path in southern Scotland, linking the Forest of Ae in Dumfries and Galloway with Hawick in the Scottish Borders. The route, which is 84 km long, uses forest tracks, drovers' roads and some sections of public road to link Roman roads across the border country of Scotland. It takes its name from these roads, and the fact that it passes through areas associated with the Border Reivers, the name given to cattle raiders along the Anglo-Scottish border between late 13th century to the beginning of the 17th century. The route is intended to be suitable for walkers, cyclists and horseriders, having been specifically developed to include features such as self-closing gates.

The Romans and Reivers Route was originally developed by British Horse Society Scotland, and is now managed by the local authorities of the two council areas through which it passes: Dumfries and Galloway Council and Scottish Borders Council. The route is designated as one of Scotland's Great Trails by NatureScot, and links with four other Great Trails:

- Annandale Way at Beattock
- Borders Abbeys Way at Hawick
- Cross Borders Drove Road at Hawick
- Southern Upland Way, which shares sections of path with the Romans and Reivers Route around Beattock
