= Mutiny Stones =

Coordinates: 55.822975°N 2.604086°W

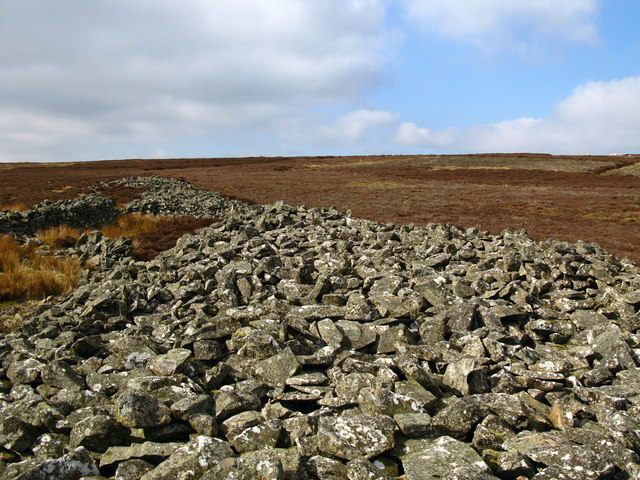
Mutiny Stones on Byrecleugh Ridge.

The Mutiny Stones are a megalithic monument in the Lammermuir Hills, Scotland.

Situated on Byrecleugh Rig, the nearest centre of habitation is at Longformacus, some four miles away.

The monument is constructed as a long cairn, and is thought to date to the 3rd Millennium BC.

The name of the monument is a corruption of the Scots, mittenfu' o stones. This term arose because of a local legend that the devil was passing above and dropped a handful of boulders at the spot. The name was later corrupted to the Meeting stones, and thence to Mutiny stones.

The monument has been repeatedly robbed of stone over the years by shepherds, to create stells and dry stone walls. It now stands at 8 feet (2.4 m) at its highest point, although within recorded memory it was said to be 18 feet (5.5 m) high.

== Bibliography ==
- Hewat, James (1925). Proceedings Of The Society Of Antiquaries Of Scotland 1924-1925. Vol. 59. Neill. pp. 198-204.
