= Cross Borders Drove Road =

Hiking trail in Scotland

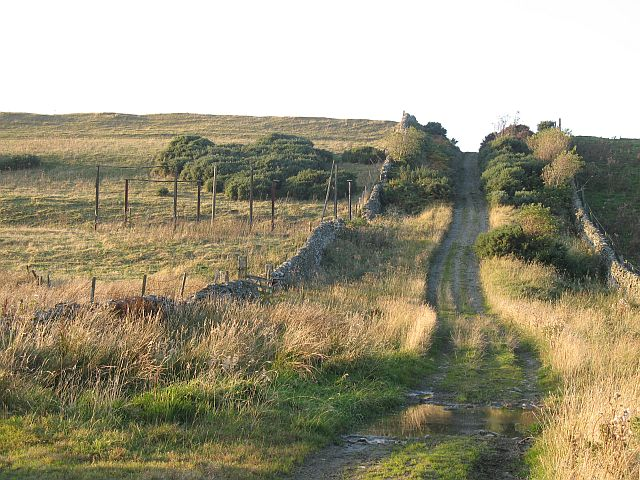
- The Drove Road at Whitehaughmoor, northwest of Hawick.
- Length: 82 km (51 mi)
- Location: Scottish Borders, Scotland
- Designation: Scotland’s Great Trails
- Trailheads: Hawick 55.422°N 2.787°W; Little Vantage 55.851°N 3.437°W
- Use: Horseriding, hiking, mountain biking,
- Elevation gain/loss: 2,165 metres (7,103 ft) gain
- Season: All Year
- Waymark: Predominantly

The Cross Borders Drove Road is an 82-kilometre (51 mi) long hiking trail in the Borders region of Scotland. The route is based on the main route used by drovers who used to drive cattle from the markets (trysts) at places such as Falkirk and Crieff southwards for sale in England.

== Description ==
Much of the route utilises the original parallel dykes built to stop cattle straying, and is intended to be suitable for horseriders and walkers, with all obstacles such as gates and bridges being designed specifically to accommodate horses; much of the route is also suitable for mountain bikers.

It is listed as one of Scotland's Great Trails by NatureScot, and links directly to three further Great Trails: the Borders Abbeys Way, the·Romans and Reivers Route and the·Southern Upland Way. The route is now largely managed by Scottish Borders Council. The trail is waymarked using an image of a cow, reflecting the droving history of the route, although the section through Peebles is not currently waymarked.

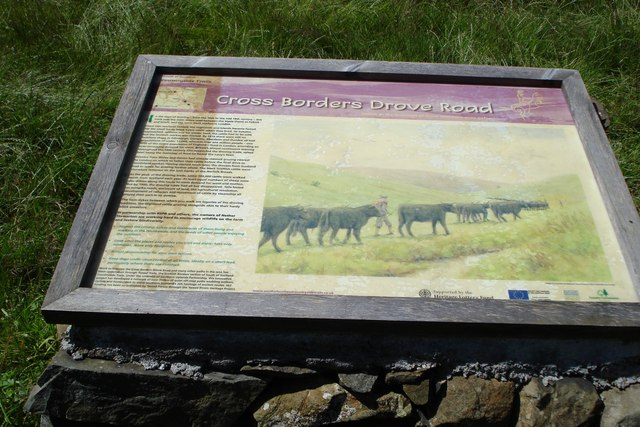
Information Board on the section between West Linton and Peebles.

As a drove road, the route was originally established by tradition, following natural passes in the Pentland and Southern Upland hills. Much of the route had become impassable by the 1990s due to obstructions such as fallen trees and poor drainage. An initiative by local members and officers of the British Horse Society saw community councils undertaking a series of mapping exercises, which identified numerous routes suitable for development as designated trails: the Cross Borders Drove Road was one of the routes identified.
