= Scottish Coastal Way =

Proposed national long-distance trail

The Scottish Coastal Way is a proposed national long-distance trail that would follow the coastline of mainland Scotland. The concept originated among walkers, and in November 2009 Scottish Natural Heritage (SNH) hosted a conference to explore the idea. In 2010 SNH estimated that approximately 2,700 kilometres (1,700 mi) of coastal paths and routes were already in existence, compared with a total coastline length of 10,192 km (6,333 mi). The existing paths were concentrated in more populous areas, with relatively few in more remote regions such as the Highlands and Islands. It was recognised that a continuous coastal route, similar to the Wales Coast Path, could offer significant benefits, although the creation of a fully waymarked trail might conflict with conservation objectives, including the protection of the "wild land" character of much of the Scottish coast.

Scotland's statutory right of responsible access allows people to walk the entire coastline without restriction, and there is therefore no legal barrier to completing a full coastal journey. Existing coastal paths are listed below. There is a long-term aspiration to link these routes to form a complete Scottish Coastal Way by 2030.

== Existing coastal paths ==
=== Mainland ===
Listed in anti-clockwise direction, starting at the border with England north of Berwick:

- Berwickshire Coastal Path
- John Muir Way
- St Margaret's Way runs 98 km (61 mi) from the St Mary's Metropolitan cathedral in the centre of Edinburgh across the Forth Road Bridge to end at the ancient town of St Andrews.
- Fife Coastal Path
- Aberdeenshire Coastal Trail
- Moray Coast Trail
- John o' Groats Trail
- North Highland Way
- Firth of Clyde Rotary Trail, 276 km (171 mi) long, combines three long-distance coastal routes between Mull of Galloway and Milngavie, along the Ayrshire coast and Upper Clyde:
  - Clyde Coastal Path runs 56 km (35 mi) from the Kelly Burn to Greenock, then to Milngavie. It links the Ayrshire Coastal Path and the West Highland Way, and is part of the International Appalachian Trail (Scotland), which follows the entire western seaboard of Scotland.
  - Ayrshire Coastal Path is 161 km (100 mi) long – Loch Ryan Coastal Path, an extension running 19 km (12 mi) south from Glenapp Kirk to Stranraer and connecting to the Southern Upland Way.
  - Mull of Galloway Trail is 59 km (37 mi) long.

=== Coastal paths on islands ===
- Arran Coastal Way
- West Island Way

== See also ==
- Coastline of the United Kingdom
- King Charles III England Coast Path
- List of long-distance footpaths in the United Kingdom
- North Sea Trail
- Raad ny Foillan - coastal path around the Isle of Man
- Walking in the United Kingdom
