= Sir Walter Scott Way =

Footpath in Scotland

Coordinates: 55°36′N 3°4′W

The Sir Walter Scott Way is a 92-mile (148 km) long-distance footpath in the Scottish Borders. The route broadly follows the waymarked Southern Upland Way, except for in a few sections. It commemorates Sir Walter Scott, one of Scotland's most renowned writers, who had many connections with the area.

The 'Sir Walter Scott Way' runs from Moffat in Dumfries and Galloway to Cockburnspath and it is divided into six sections. It passes through Ettrick Head, St. Mary's Loch, Tibbie Shiels, Traquair, Selkirk, Galashiels, Yair, Melrose, Lauder, Longformacus, Watch Water Reservoir, and Abbey St Bathans.

== See also ==
- St. Cuthbert's Way
- Borders Abbeys Way
- Long-distance footpaths in the United Kingdom
