= King Charles III England Coast Path =

Hiking trail on the England coast

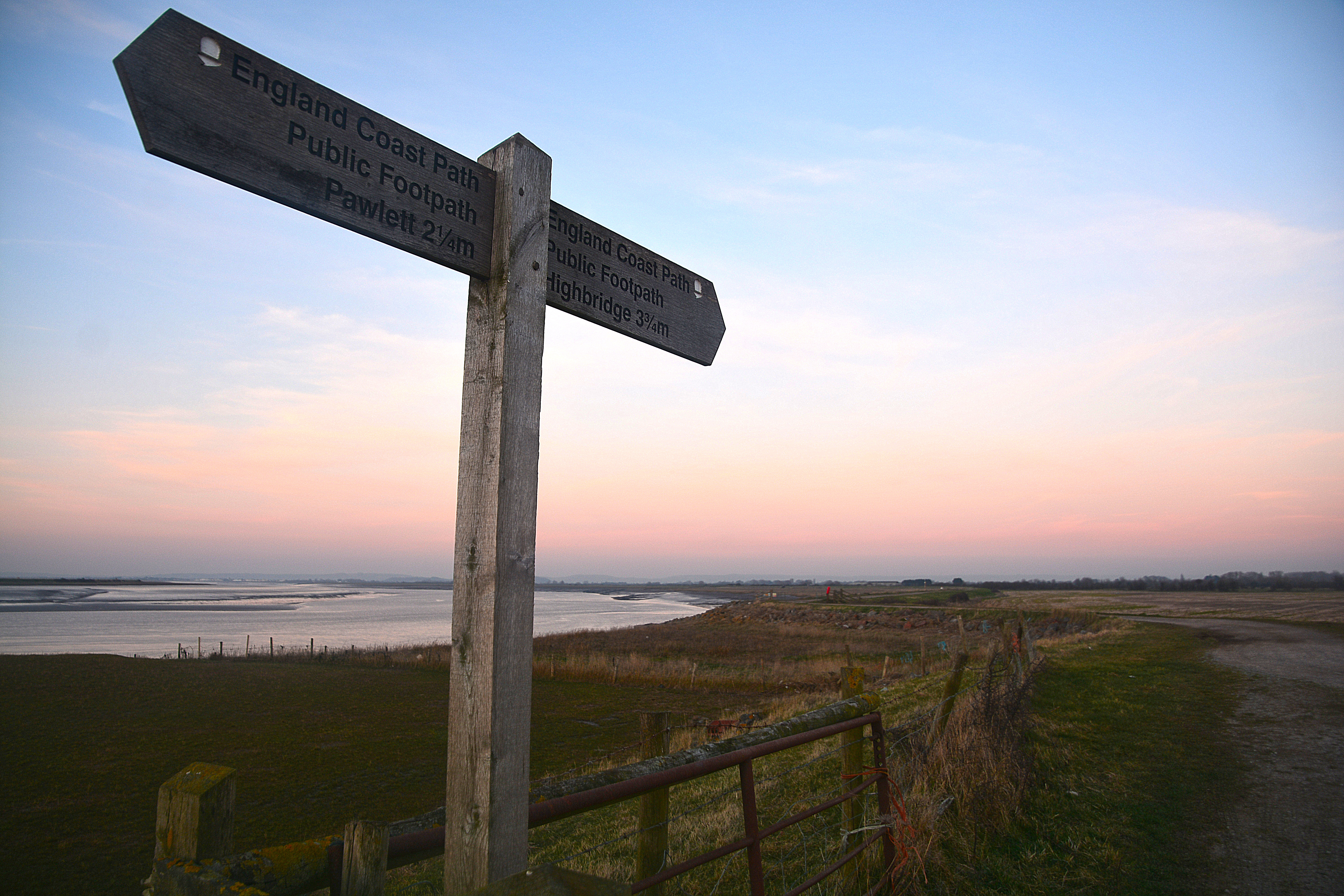
- The path passing through Sedgemoor
- Length: 2,689 mi (4,328 km)
- Location: England
- Established: 2009
- Began construction: 2010
- Completed: 2026
- Designation: National Trail
- Trailheads: Berwick-upon-Tweed for Berwickshire Coastal Path; Gretna; Queensferry for Wales Coast Path; Aust for Wales Coast Path
- Waymark: An acorn, accompanied by 'England Coast Path'
- Maintainer: Natural England
- Website: Official website

Trail map
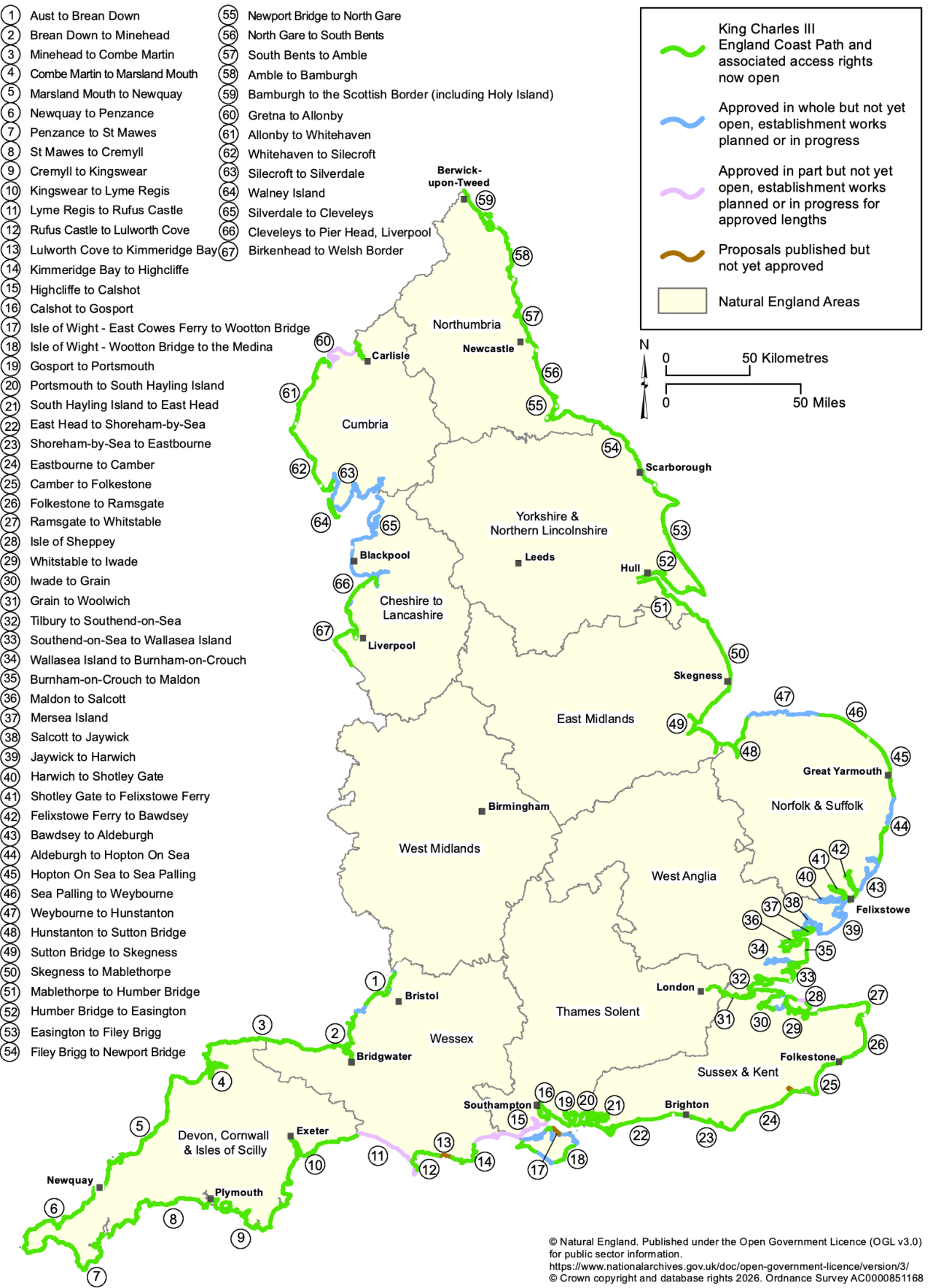
- Trail as of 4 February 2026

The King Charles III England Coast Path (KCIIIECP), originally and still commonly known as the England Coast Path, is a long-distance National Trail that follows the coastline of England. Opened on 19 March 2026 by King Charles III, the trail extends for 2,689 miles (4,328 km).

Sections of the English coast already had established walking routes, most notably the South West Coast Path. However, the Marine and Coastal Access Act 2009 required Natural England, under section 298, to create a continuous coastal path. The first section, along Weymouth Bay, opened in 2012. The walking route is the longest coastal trail in the world, and its total length increases further when considered alongside the Wales Coast Path.

== History ==
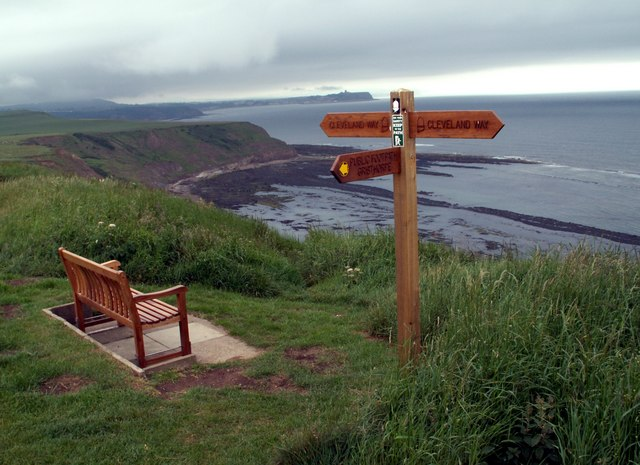
Gristhorpe cliff tops on the Cleveland Way, North York Moors National Park

=== Background ===
Following the establishment of the Pembrokeshire Coast National Park in 1952, the Welsh naturalist and author Ronald Lockley surveyed a potential route around the coast. This was subsequently constructed and opened in 1970 as the Pembrokeshire Coast Path. Lockley's 1953 report for the Countryside Commission was well received and largely adopted. Some sections of the route followed existing rights of way, but most of the land was privately owned, requiring negotiation. The majority of landowners supported the project, and many benefitted from the installation of new fencing.

In 2000, the government legislated to introduce a limited "right to roam". The Countryside and Rights of Way Act 2000 (CROW) was implemented gradually from 2000 onwards, granting the public a conditional right of access to certain areas of the English and Welsh countryside, including some coastal land. Developed land, gardens and various other areas are specifically excluded. Agricultural land is accessible only where it falls within the types defined in the Act. People exercising the right of access must respect land management needs and the protection of nature. The new rights were introduced region by region across England, with implementation completed in 2005.

In 2004, the Ramblers started their campaign, advocating for a coastal pathway.

=== Path history ===
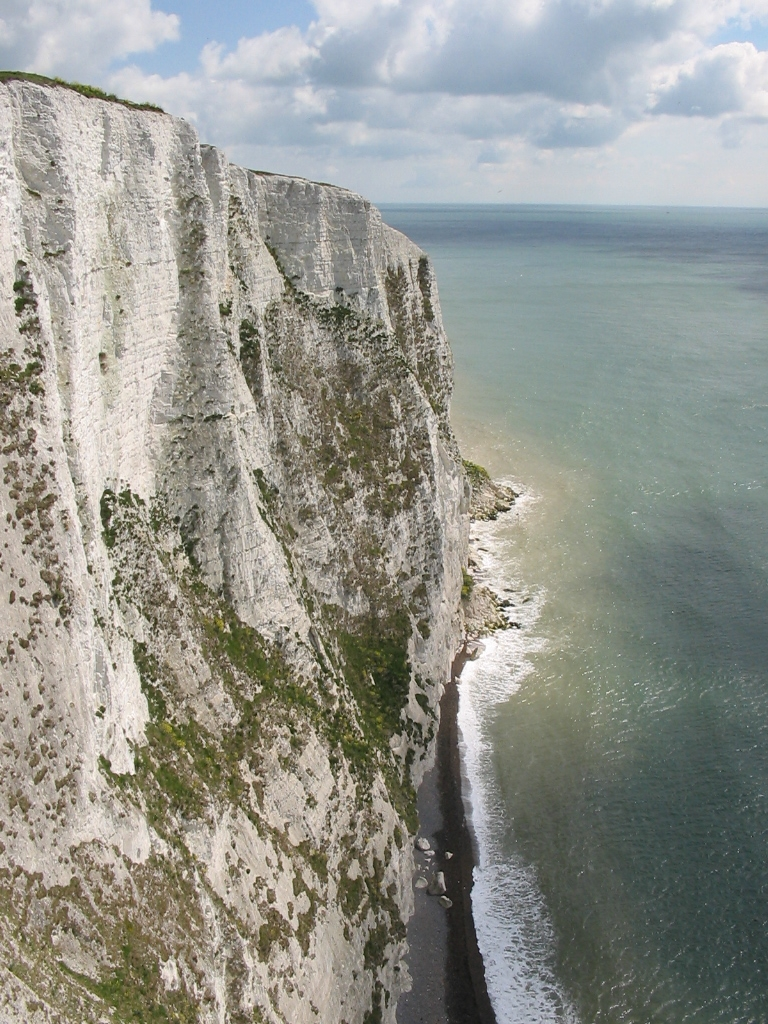
Cliffs of Dover on the Saxon Shore Way

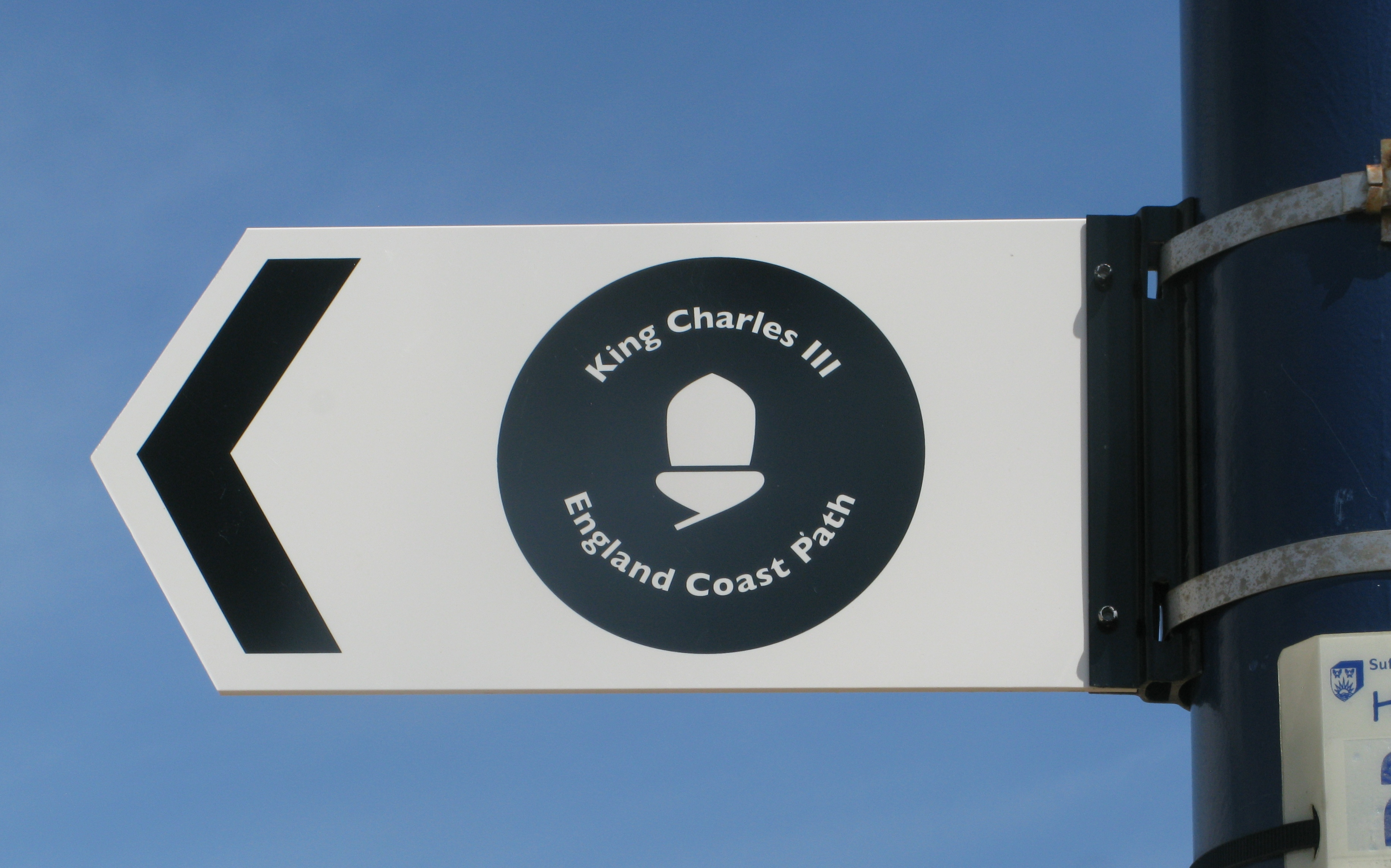
King Charles III England Coast Path sign

The King Charles III England Coast Path has been made possible by the introduction of the Right of Coastal Access under Part 9 of the Marine and Coastal Access Act 2009. The Act provides for the creation of both the England Coast Path and, in most cases, a right of access over the associated 'coastal margin'. This includes – where appropriate – any land, other than the trail itself, that forms part of the coastal margin and carries public access rights. Such areas are known as 'spreading room'. The right does not extend to private houses and gardens, or to Ministry of Defence land. The legislation also introduces 'roll back', meaning that if a section of coastline erodes, the route of the path can be adjusted inland accordingly.

Natural England's Coastal Access Scheme was approved by the Secretary of State on 9 July 2013 under section 298(2) of the Marine and Coastal Access Act 2009, and was presented to Parliament pursuant to section 298(6) of the Act.

The first instance of this new law was implemented on a stretch of the English coast at Weymouth Bay on 29 June 2012.

In December 2014, encouraged by the success of the Wales Coast Path, the government announced that more than £5 million of additional funding would be provided over the following five years to enable completion the England Coast Path by 2020, around a decade earlier than previously anticipated.

In the UK, public access to the foreshore below the high tide line has long existed. The intertidal zone is generally regarded as being owned by the Crown, although there are exceptions. In England, ownership of land typically extends only to the high water mark, with the Crown deemed to own the land below it.

Progress slowed due to COVID-19 and a European Court judgement in April 2018 regarding environmentally protected sites. Natural England hoped to have all stretches approved and work underway by the end of 2024.

In May 2023, to mark the coronation of King Charles III, Secretary of State for Environment, Food and Rural Affairs Thérèse Coffey announced that the England Coast Path would be renamed the King Charles III England Coast Path. New branding was introduced to reflect the colours of the English flag, with signage being gradually introduced across new stretches of the path.

On 19 March 2026, King Charles III attended a reception hosted by the South Downs National Park Authority to mark the opening of the coastal path; at that date it was about 80% complete.

== Existing coastal trails ==
Existing coastal trails in England will be incorporated into the King Charles III England Coast Path. Signage along the whole route now falls to a uniform design. These paths are:

- Bournemouth Coast Path: 20 miles (32 km)
- Cleveland Way (coastal section from Filey to Saltburn): 50 miles (80 km)
- Cumbria Coastal Way: 185 miles (298 km)
- Durham Coastal Footpath: 11 miles (18 km)
- Isle of Wight Coastal Path: 67 miles (108 km)
- Lancashire Coastal Way: 66 miles (106 km)
- Norfolk Coast Path: 45 miles (72 km)
- Northumberland Coast Path: 63 miles (101 km)
- Saxon Shore Way: 163 miles (262 km)
- Solent Way: 60 miles (97 km)
- South West Coast Path: 630 miles (1,010 km)
- Suffolk Coast Path: 50 miles (80 km)
- West Somerset Coast Path: 58 miles (93 km)

== Linking trails ==
=== Scottish border ===
The coastal path has four trailheads. At Berwick, the England Coast Path connects to the Berwickshire Coastal Path. There are plans to create a Scottish Coastal Way, which would likely link at Berwick. At Gretna, the path may connect to the Scottish Coastal Way, if it is built. Here, the path can also connect to Hadrian's Wall Path, allowing for users to connect back to the England Coast Path, at Newcastle upon Tyne, south of Berwick.

=== Welsh border ===
At Queensferry, the England Coastal path connects to the Wales Coastal Path. Likewise, at Aust, the Wales Coast Path can be accessed by crossing the Severn Bridge. The England–Wales border can be followed from both trailheads, by using the Offa's Dyke Path.

=== Connections with other National Trails ===
- South Downs Way at Eastbourne
- North Downs Way at Dover
- Yorkshire Wolds Way at Filey
- Cleveland Way at Saltburn-by-the-Sea and Filey
- The Royal Military Canal path at Seabrook, Kent
- Pedders way at Holme-next-the-Sea
- Hadrian's Wall Path at Bowness-on-Solway
- Coast to Coast Walk at Robin Hood's Bay and St Bees
- Thames Path at Woolwich

== The route ==
National trail website is split into 8 sections as to help make information about the trail easier to find with the trail being split into:

1. North East & East Coast: Marshall Meadows Bay, Northumberland to the Humber Bridge
2. Lincolnshire Coast: Humber bridge to Sutton Bridge
3. East Anglia: Sutton Bridge to Tilbury
4. South East: Woolwich to Shoreham-by-Sea
5. South: Shoreham-by-Sea to Barton on Sea
6. South West - Channel Coast: Barton on Sea to Penzance
7. South West - Channel Coast:Penzance to Severn Bridge
8. North West:Welsh border near Burton to Scottish border near Gretna

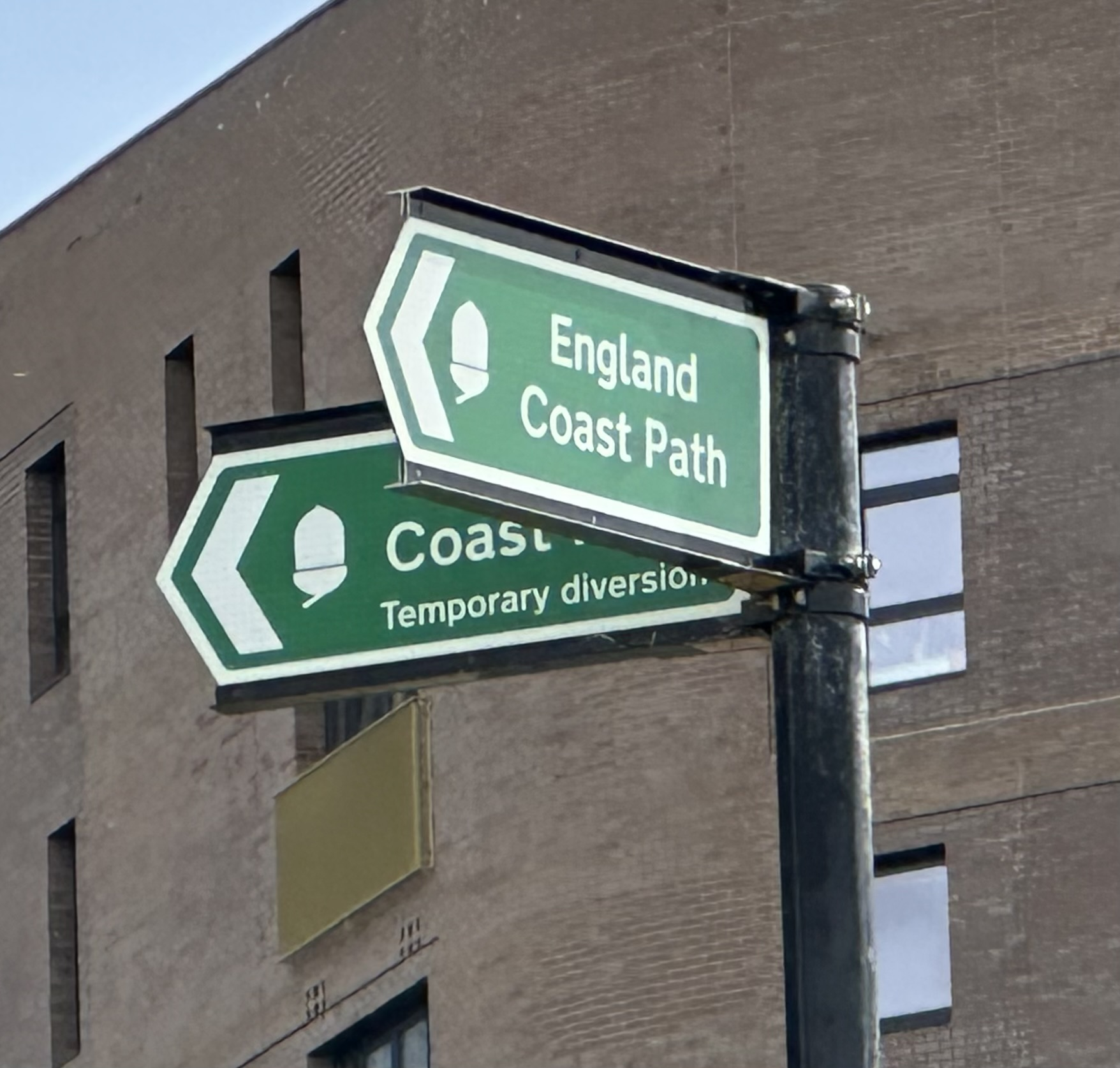
England Coast Path route sign in Chatham, Kent

=== Gaps ===
The path includes two gaps, both around the Furness and Cartmel peninsulas in Cumbria. Walkers are expected to take the train between Arnside and Grange-over-Sands, to the east of the Cartmel Peninsula. They can then cross by footbridge to the Furness Peninsula, but must take a train west of the peninsula, between Foxfield and Green Road.

== See also ==
- Coastline of the United Kingdom
- E9 European long distance path
- List of long-distance footpaths in the United Kingdom
- Raad ny Foillan – coastal path around the Isle of Man
- Scottish Coastal Way
- Wales Coast Path
- Walking in the United Kingdom
