= St Oswald's Way =

97-mile footpath in Northumberland, England

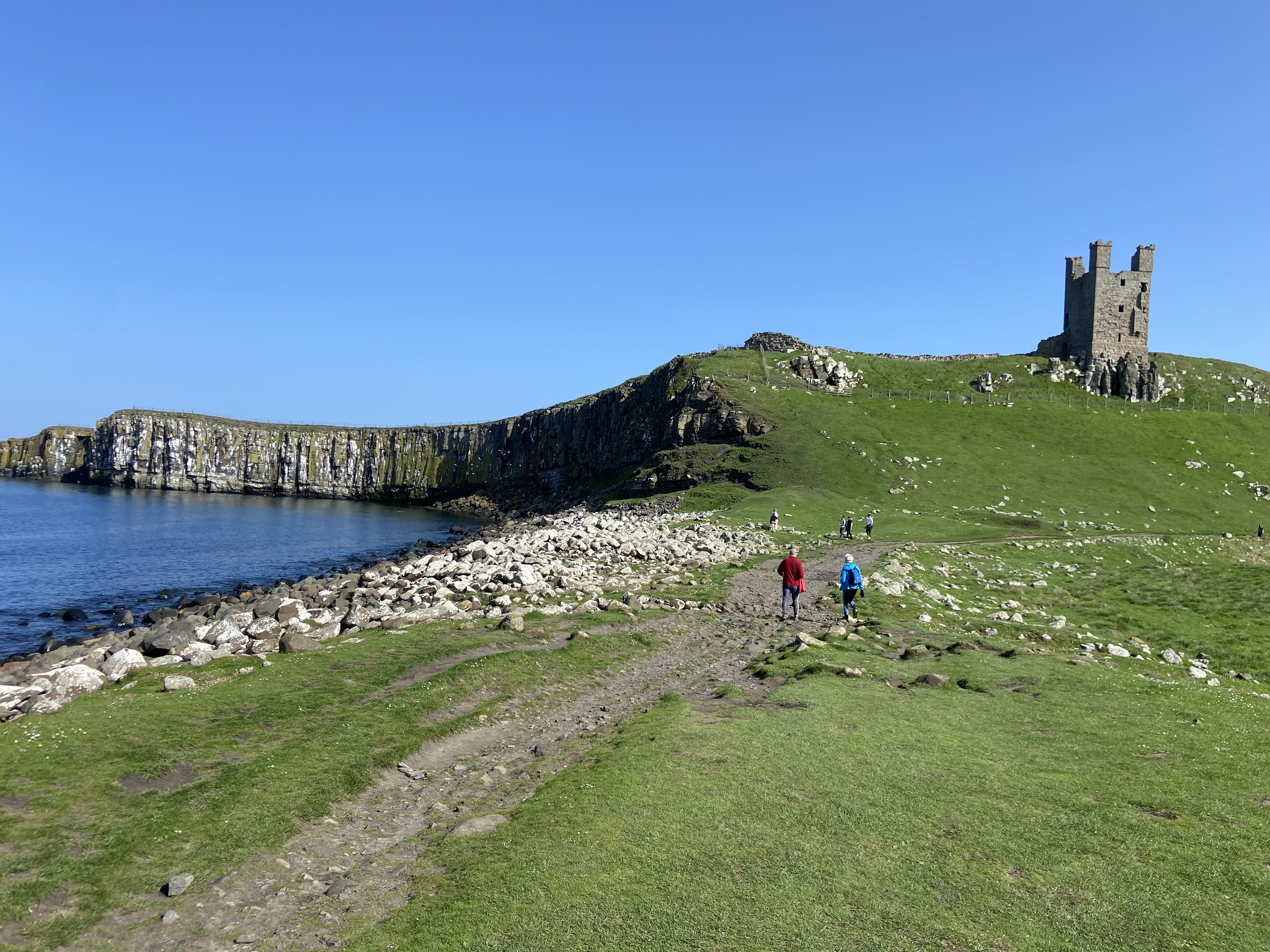
St Oswald's Way approaching Dunstanburgh Castle from Embleton

St. Oswald’s Way is a long-distance walking route, exploring some of the landscapes and history of Northumberland, England’s most northerly county.

There are castles, coastline, islands, river valleys, hills, villages, forest and farmland on the walk.

From Holy Island (Lindisfarne) in the north, St. Oswald’s Way follows the Northumbrian coast south to Warkworth, before heading inland to Hadrian's Wall and Heavenfield, a distance of 97 miles (156 km). Between the landward end of the Holy Island causeway and Warkworth the route coincides with the Northumberland Coast Path.

The route was launched in 2006 and links some of the places associated with St. Oswald, the king of Northumbria in the early seventh-century, who played a major part in bringing Christianity to his people. The route leads from Bamburgh Castle to the site of the Battle of Heavenfield near Chollerford, passing through Alnmouth, Felton, and Rothbury.

== In popular culture ==
It has been featured in 2026 in BBC Pilgrimage.
