= Southern Upland Way =

Long-distance footpath in Scotland

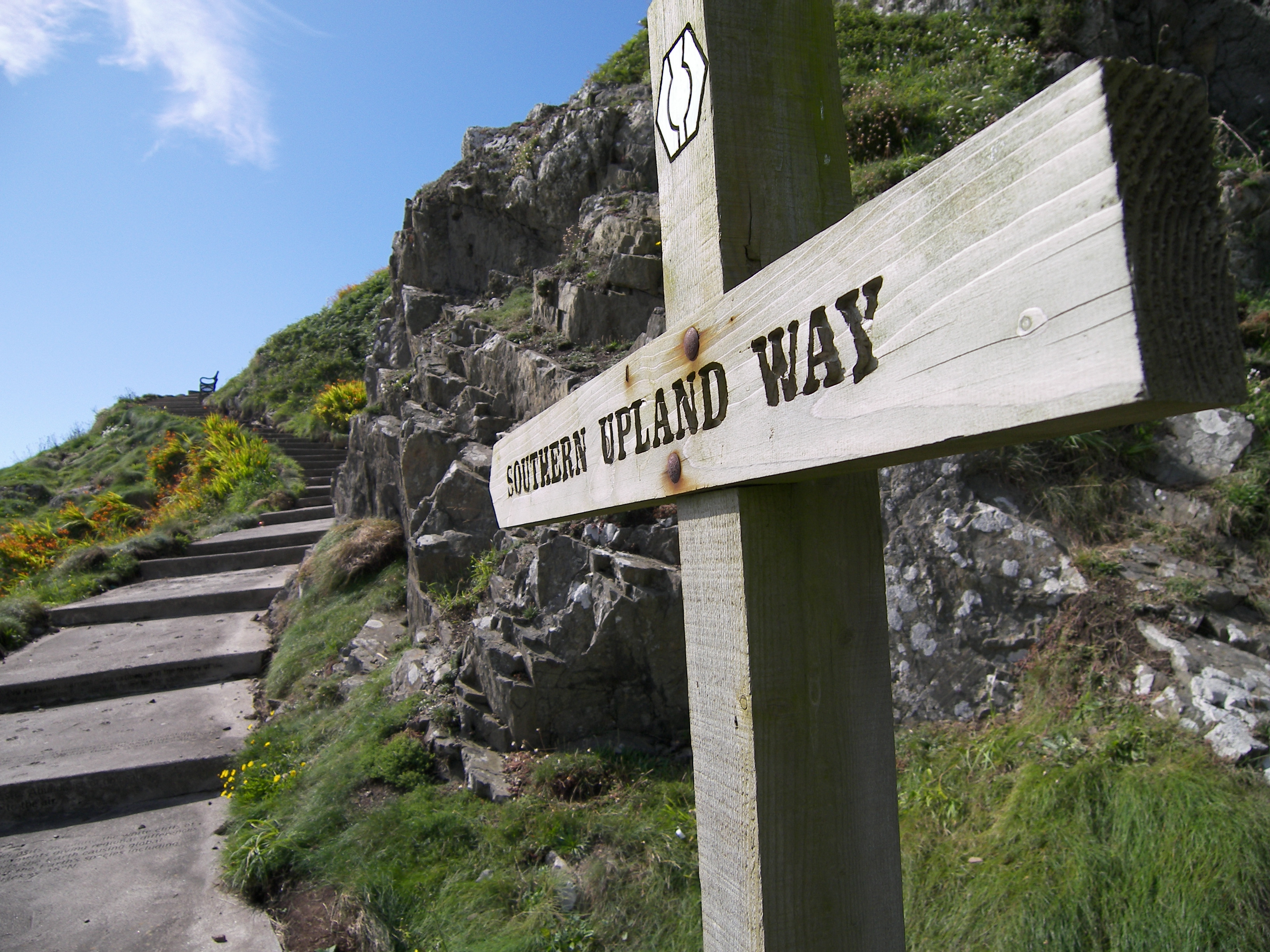
- The start of the Southern Upland Way in Portpatrick.
- Length: 344 kilometres (214 mi)
- Location: Southern Uplands, Scotland
- Established: 1984
- Designation: Scotland's Great Trails
- Trailheads: Portpatrick (54°50′35″N 5°07′12″W); Cockburnspath (55°55′55″N 2°21′47″W)
- Use: Walking, horse riding, cycling
- Elevation gain/loss: 7,775 metres (25,509 ft) gain.
- Season: All year
- Waymark: Yes
- Website: https://www.scotlandsgreattrails.com/trail/southern-upland-way/

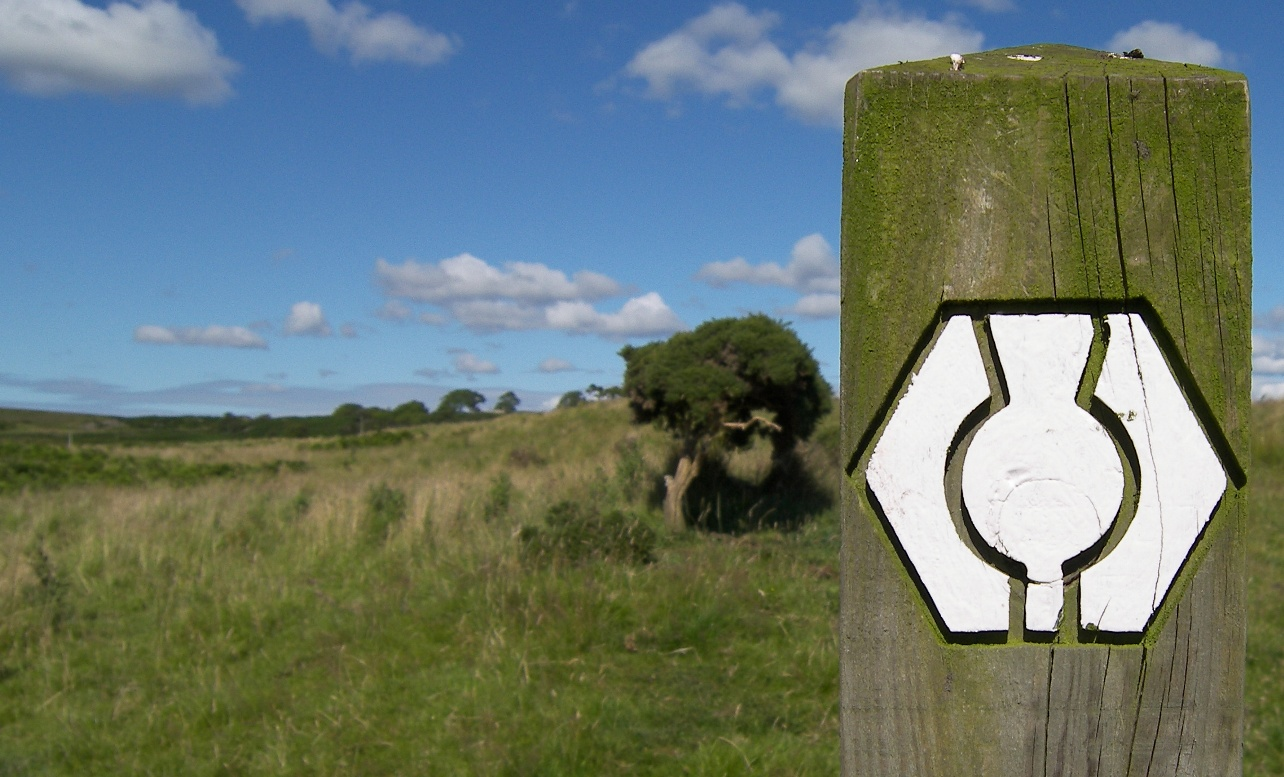
Typical marker

The Southern Upland Way is a 344-kilometre (214 mi) coast-to-coast long-distance footpath in southern Scotland. The route links Portpatrick in the west and Cockburnspath in the east via the hills of the Southern Uplands. The Way is designated as one of Scotland's Great Trails by NatureScot and is the longest of the 29 Great Trails. The Southern Upland Way meets with seven of the other Great Trails: the Annandale Way, the Berwickshire Coastal Path, the Borders Abbeys Way, the Cross Borders Drove Road, the Mull of Galloway Trail, the Romans and Reivers Route and St Cuthbert's Way.

The path is maintained by the local authorities of the two main council areas through which it passes: Dumfries and Galloway Council and Scottish Borders Council; a short section in the Lowther Hills lies in South Lanarkshire. It is primarily intended for walkers, but many parts are suitable for mountain bikers; some sections are also suitable for horse riders. About 80,000 people use the path every year, of whom about 1,000 complete the entire route and a completion certificate can be applied for through the Southern Upland Way official website. It is considered the most difficult of Scotland's Great Trails but also one of the most rewarding to complete passing through some of the UK's most remote land. A popular and less challenging option is to walk it in two stages: typically Portpatrick to Moffat, then Moffat to Cockburnspath at a later date.

== History ==
It was one of the original four formally designated long-distance routes in Scotland, and when it opened in 1984, it was the UK's first officially recognised coast-to-coast long-distance route. Since opening, there have been improvements to the path with improved signage, drainage work, landscaping and path construction. When the route was planned, it was only designed for walkers, but in recent years many stiles have been replaced by gates for horseriders and cyclists. In 2010, "The New Hoard" treasure hunt was created, which features land art and sculpted containers, or kists, which contain coins, known as 13ths, which walkers can collect. In 2014 the way was named one of "the top ten best ever British hikes" by Rough Guides.

The current fastest time to complete the route is 55 hours and 42 minutes by Jack Scott, set in October 2020. The women's record is 62 hours and 20 minutes, achieved by Jo Zakrzewski in August 2021. In 2022 Woody Felton became the first person to complete the out and back from Portpatrick to Cockburnspath and back to Portpatrick, completing the 428 miles in a week.

== The route ==
The path visits Castle Kennedy, New Luce, Bargrennan, St John's Town of Dalry, Sanquhar, Wanlockhead, Beattock, St Mary's Loch, Traquair, Galashiels, Lauder, Abbey St Bathans, and Longformacus en route. The Sir Walter Scott Way shares the last five places with the Southern Upland Way. The Annandale Way running through Annandale from the source of the River Annan to the sea joins the Southern Upland Way briefly at Beattock. Between Stranraer and Melrose, the Southern Upland Way forms part of the E2 European long distance path, which runs for 3,010 miles (4,850 km) from Galway to Nice.

== See also ==
- Pennine Way National Trail
- Roman Heritage Way
- Long-distance footpaths in the United Kingdom
- List of places in the Scottish Borders

== Publications ==
- Smith, Roger. The Southern Upland Way, Official Guide. Edinburgh: Mercat Press. ISBN 978-0-11-495170-2.
- Writing the Way – A collection of Journeys along the Southern Upland Way, published to commemorate the 21st anniversary of the route in 2005, available from the Southern Uplands Partnership http://www.sup.org.uk or from http://www.suw21.com
