= Ayrshire Coastal Path =

Great Trail in South Ayrshire, Scotland

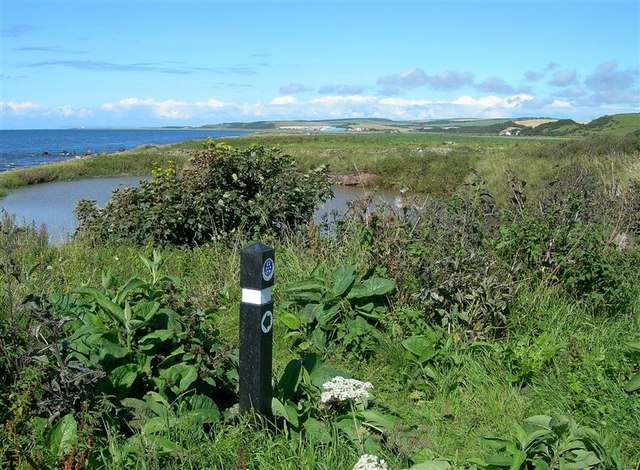
- On the Coastal Path, to the north of Girvan.
- Length: 161 km (100 mi)
- Location: Ayrshire, Scotland
- Established: 2008
- Designation: Scotland's Great Trails
- Trailheads: Glenapp, Ballantrae55.028°N 5.015°W; Skelmorlie55.874°N 4.889°W
- Use: Hiking
- Elevation gain/loss: 1,110 metres (3,640 ft) gain
- Lowest point: Sea level
- Website: https://ayrshirecoastalpath.org/

The Ayrshire Coastal Path is a coastal long-distance hiking path in Ayrshire, Scotland. The route, which is 161 kilometres (100 mi) long, runs along the coast from Glenapp, Ballantrae to Skelmorlie. South of Glenapp, the route links with the Mull of Galloway Trail to Stranraer.

The path was developed by the Rotary Club of Ayr, and opened in June 2008. It is now designated as one of Scotland's Great Trails by NatureScot, and also forms part of the International Appalachian Trail.

The route is primarily designed for walkers, and as much of the middle and north sections are alongside beaches it is also suitable for horse riding. The northern section, between Ayr and Largs, is coincident with National Cycle Network routes 7 and 73 and is suitable for cyclists. About 3,000 people use the path every year.

== See also ==
- Scottish Coastal Way
