= Mull of Galloway Trail =

Long-distance path in southern Scotland

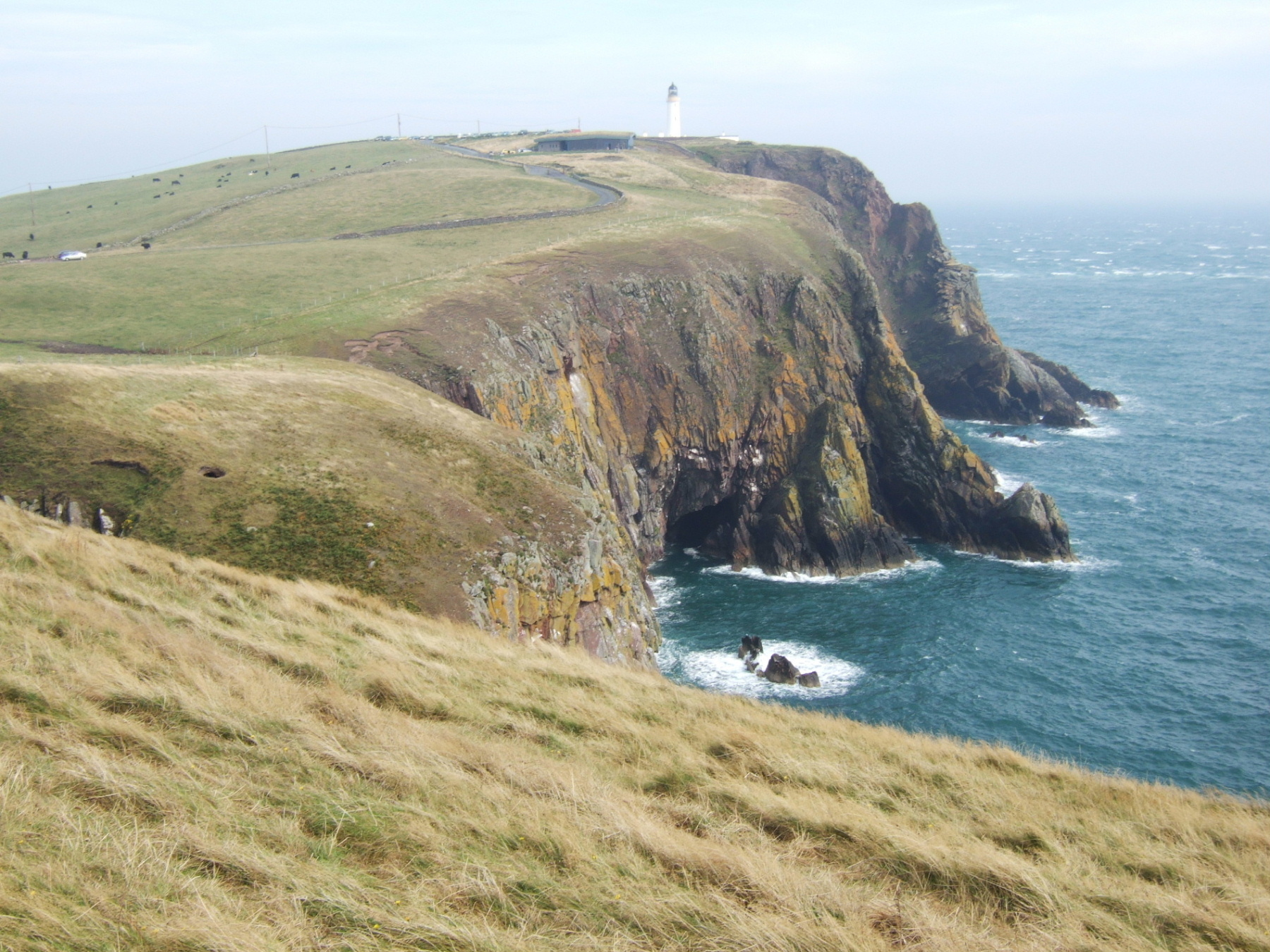
- Mull of Galloway headland.
- Length: 59 km (37 mi)
- Location: Dumfries and Galloway, Scotland
- Designation: Scotland's Great Trails
- Trailheads: Mull of Galloway54.635°N 4.856°W; Glenapp, Ballantrae55.028°N 5.015°W
- Use: Hiking
- Elevation gain/loss: 480 metres (1,570 ft) gain
- Waymark: Yes
- Website: https://www.mullofgallowaytrail.co.uk/

The Mull of Galloway Trail is a coastal long-distance path in Dumfries and Galloway, Scotland. The route, which is 59 km (37 mi) long, runs along the coast from Glenapp near Ballantrae (where the trail links with the Ayrshire Coastal Path) to the Mull of Galloway. The path was developed by the Rotary Club of Stranraer, who maintain the route on a voluntary basis. It opened in 2012, and is now designated as one of Scotland's Great Trails by NatureScot. It also forms part of the International Appalachian Trail.

The northern section of the route, between Stranraer and Glenapp section was previously designated as the Loch Ryan Coastal Path, with the southern section to the Mull being added later. Waymarking on the northern section is still (as of 2018) distinct from the newer southern section.

A marathon, also organised by the Rotary Club of Stranraer, is held annually along the southern section of the route between Mull of Galloway and Stranraer. A shorter 16-kilometre (10 mi) race is also run: this route starts in Sandhead to also finish in Stranraer.

== See also ==
- Scottish Coastal Way
