= Nick Hounsfield =

British surfer and social entrepreneur

- Born: 17 September 1973 (age 52); Bristol, United Kingdom
- Occupations: Entrepreneur Founder & CVO The Wave Director Surfing England
- Website: www.thewave.com

Nick Hounsfield is a British surfer, social entrepreneur, founder and chief visionary officer of The Wave, an inland surfing centre in Bristol, United Kingdom. Hounsfield has a particular interest in surfing and so-called "blue health", adaptive and para surfing, and policy-shaping and development. He is a member of the UK Sport International Leadership Programme and as a Director of Surfing England oversees surfing’s first funding from UK Sport.

== Personal life ==
Nick Hounsfield was introduced to surfing by his father Brian, an osteopath and sailor, in the mid 1970s on regular visits to Cornwall, and has been an avid surfer ever since. Hounsfield graduated as an osteopath in 1997 with a BSc (Hons) from the British School of Osteopathy and was founder and clinical director of The Family Practice, Bristol with his wife, Juliana Hounsfield. In 2009, Hounsfield became a Council Member on the healthcare regulator the General Osteopathic Council.

After his father died, Hounsfield began to think about open spaces connected to nature where activity and socialisation across generations would be encouraged and embraced. He started talking with environmental activist, lobbyist and long-time surfer Chris Hines, a founding member of the environmental action group Surfers Against Sewage and former sustainability director at the Eden Project. Hounsfield and Hines researched how they could replicate the power of open ocean surfing to deliver a safe, sustainable inland surfing destination for people of all ages, backgrounds and abilities. Hounsfield saw surfing as a tool to start having conversations about wellbeing and was driven to make a social impact through a project improving the quality of health in communities in green and blue outdoor spaces that could both educate and rehabilitate.

In February 2020, Hounsfield suffered multiple strokes that affected his speech. This, however, by his own admission built his resilience.

== Career ==
Hounsfield founded The Wave in 2012 with sustainability at the heart and the aim to bring year-round consistent surfing and its benefits to a safe inland environment for both beginners and experts, starting with Bristol. Hounsfield partnered with business directors Craig Stoddart and Nick Asheshov, and campaigned to raise attention, funds, land and technology for the project. They raised £26 million through investment and secured site planning in 2014 to construct the facility. The Wave Bristol opened in October 2019.

Hounsfield is a Director of English and British Surfing and has worked with the British and English Surf Teams for the annual ISA World Surfing Games and annual ISA World Para Surfing Championships. He is director for Surfing England and Chair of the Board of Directors. In 2019, Hounsfield joined the UK Sport International Leadership Programme to represent British Surfing. Hounsfield has overseen surfing's first funding from UK Sport to invest in the Olympic and Paralympic Games.

Hounsfield has been an activist for the emerging field of ‘blue health’, exploring how the body and the mind responds to being in or near water. Marine social scientist Easkey Britton collated the research of 33 studies featuring more than 2,000 people to evidence support of water-based healthcare and blue health. Britton, Hounsfield and Wallace Nichols (author of Blue Mind) have been among a number of academics and surfers describing the positive sensation of water for the body and mind.

In 2020, Hounsfield spearheaded a partnership between The Wave and The Wave Project to begin a surf-therapy pilot for children aged eight to 18 in the greater Bristol area who suffer from poor mental health. The Wave Project founder Joe Taylor explained how the sessions are designed to build confidence, self-esteem and resilience. The program was first made available on NHS prescription in May 2019 for children in Devon and Cornwall after a pilot project that began in 2010. In 2018 an independent report revealed that the courses “consistently improved the wellbeing of young people” and “had a lasting, positive impact.”

== Awards and honours ==
Hounsfield was voted one of the UK's “Most Disruptive Entrepreneurs” by The Daily Telegraph in 2014 across fields of technology, finance, retail, sport and manufacturing. In 2015 Hounsfield featured in Business West as one of “9 young entrepreneurs nailing the start-up scene in the South West”. In 2018, Hounsfield was listed in the Business Leaders Top 50 Southwest Entrepreneurs, featuring leaders who have had a positive economic impact in the South West UK. Business Leader described Hounsfield's “relentless vision to create an inland surfing destination” that “has seen the business attract millions of pounds in investment.”
