= Red Bull Unleashed =

Surfing competition held on 18/19 September 2015 in north Wales

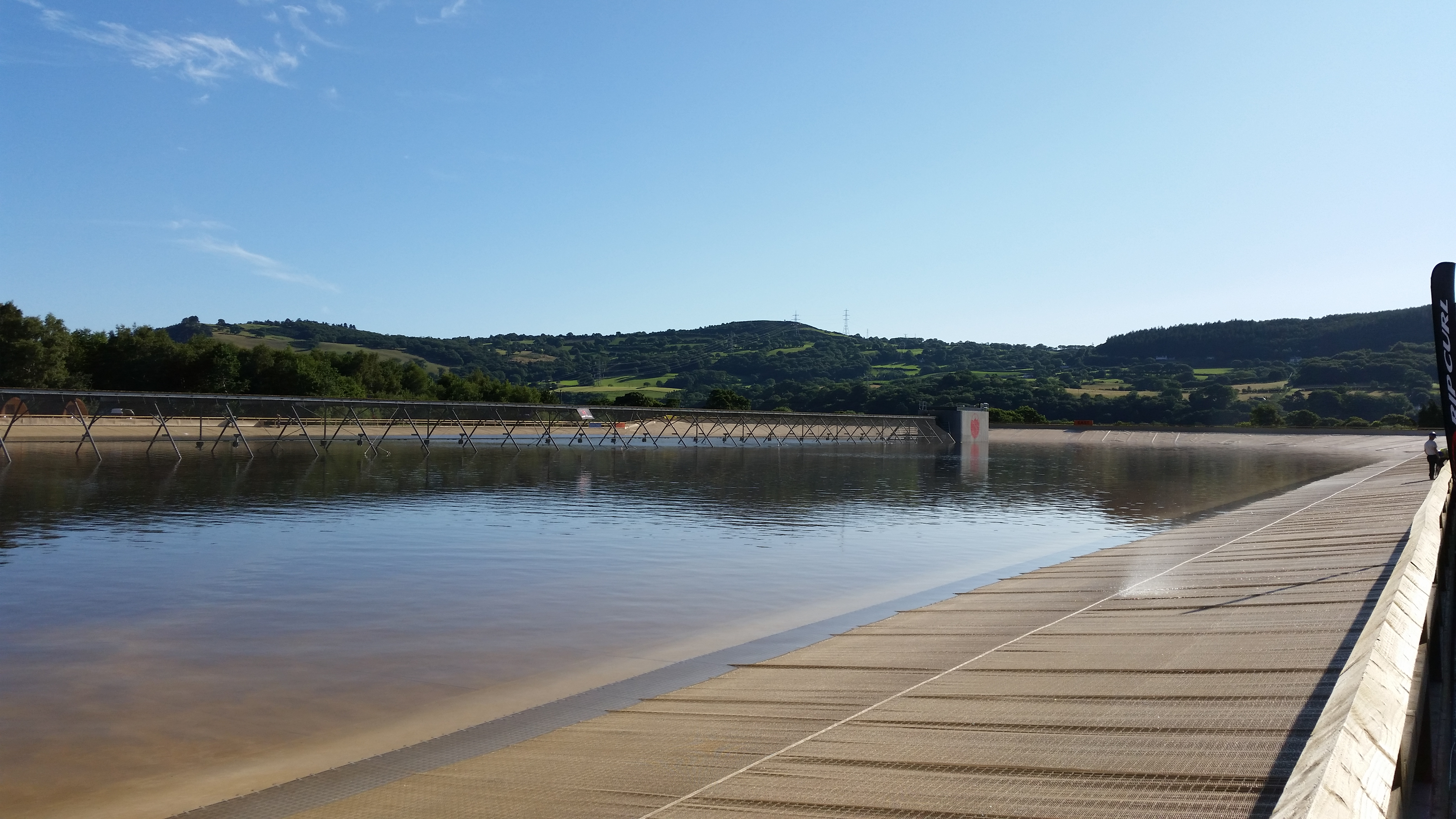
The artificial wave pool at Surf Snowdonia, looking east.

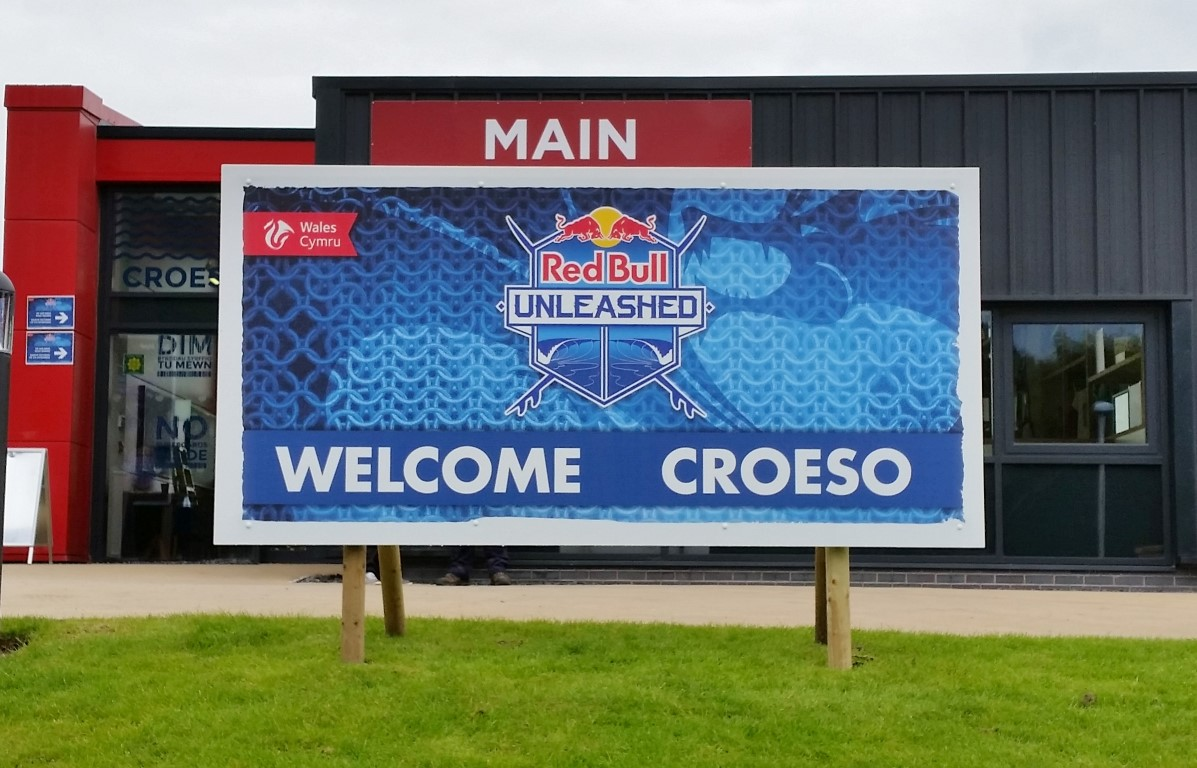
Red Bull Unleashed welcome board at Surf Snowdonia.

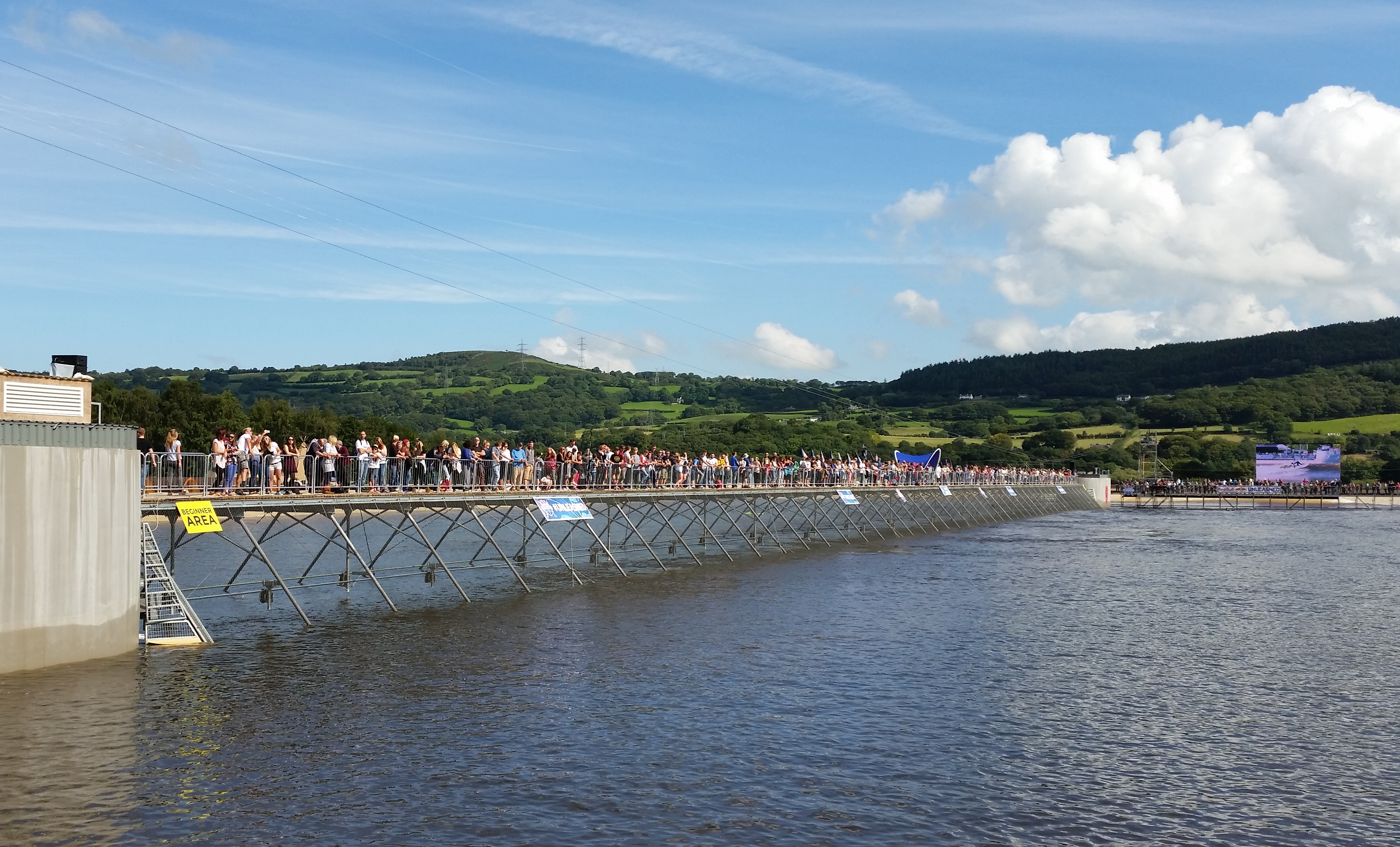
The pier at Surf Snowdonia was used as an additional spectator area

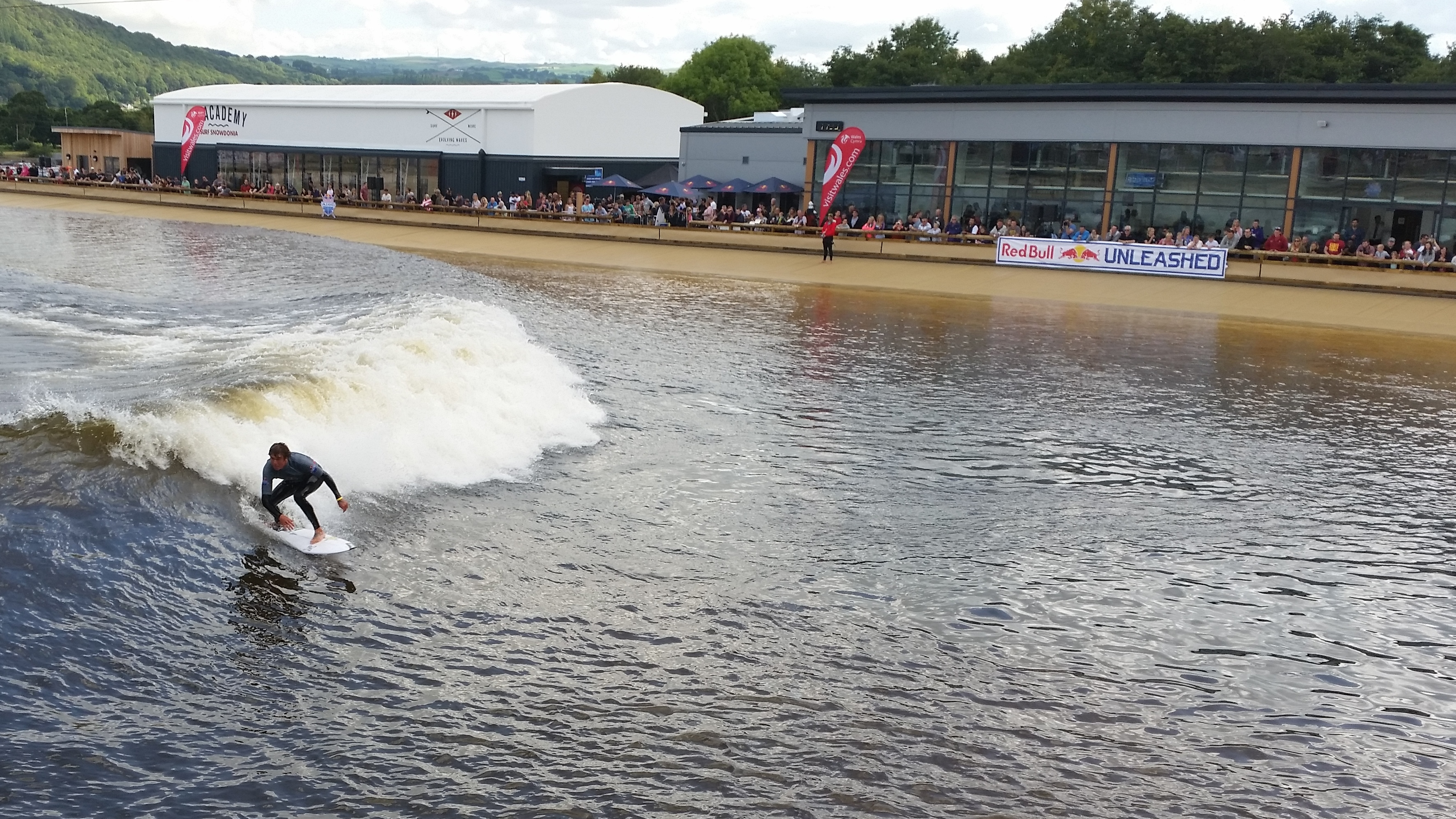
Surfing at the finals of Red Bull Unleashed

Red Bull Unleashed was a surfing competition held on 18/19 September 2015 at Surf Snowdonia in Dolgarrog, north Wales. The artificial wave pool, owned by Conwy Adventure Leisure Ltd, is the world's first commercial artificial surfing lake and the United Kingdom's only artificial surfing lake. It opened in August 2015.

Red Bull Unleashed was the first major event to be held at Surf Snowdonia, and was the world's first-ever stadium surf contest.

Qualification for Red Bull Unleashed took place on the previous day, 17 September, when 24 competitors were seeded following surfing on 6 waves, and the 16 main finalists selected.

The event, attended by over 2000 spectators on the final day, was won by Hawaiian surfer Albee Layer, who beat New Zealander Billy Stairmand.

== Results ==
The 16 international finalists comprised -

- 5 surfers from Australia
- 3 surfers from Hawaii
- 3 surfers from Great Britain
- 1 surfer from New Zealand
- 1 surfer from the United States
- 1 surfer from Italy
- 1 surfer from Japan
- 1 surfer from Brazil

Friday 18 September

There were 8 heats, starting at midday, when surfers competed in match-play format, competing wave for wave in a best of five. A coin was tossed to see who surfed first. Points (out of 30) were given by the 3 judges for each wave.

(Winner listed first.)

Heat 1 : Ezekiel Lau (HAW) 3 - Alan Stokes (GBR) 0
Heat 2 : Billy Stairmand (NZL) 3 - Leo Fioravanti (ITA) 1
Heat 3 : Jack Freestone (AUS) 3 - Evan Geiselman (USA) 0
Heat 4 : Kai Hing (AUS) 3 - Kalani David (HAW) 0
Heat 5 : Jayce Robinson (GBR) 3 - Hiroto Arai (JPN) 0
Heat 6 : Albee Layer (HAW) 3 - Ian Gouveia (BRA) 2
Heat 7 : Ian Crane (AUS) 3 - Mikey Wright (AUS) 2
Heat 8 : Mitch Crews (AUS) 3 - Reubyn Ash (GBR) 1

Saturday 19 September

The remaining 8 surfers competed in 4 quarter finals, starting at midday :

Quarter Final 1 : Billy Stairmand (NZL) 3 - Ezekiel Lau (HAW) 1
Quarter Final 2 : Jack Freestone (AUS) 3 - Kai Hing (AUS) 1
Quarter Final 3 : Albee Layer (HAW) 3 - Jayce Robinson (GBR) 1
Quarter Final 4 : Mitch Crews (AUS) 3 - Ian Crane (AUS) 1

Semi-finals commenced at 14:30 :

Semi-Final 1 : Billy Stairmand (NZL) 3 - Jack Freestone (AUS) 0
Semi-Final 2 : Albee Layer (HAW) 3 - Mitch Crews (AUS) 2

The final was held at 3:30 :

Albee Layer (HAW) 3 - Billy Stairmand (NZL) 1

== See also ==
- Red Bull
- List of surfing events
