= Easter Compton =

Village in Gloucestershire, England

Coordinates: 51°32′N 2°37′W

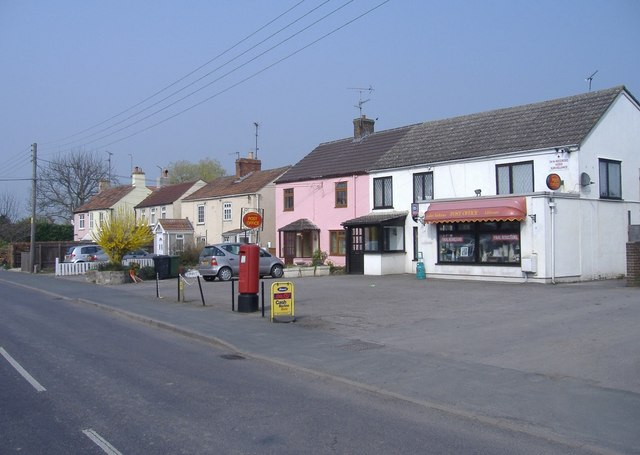
- The Post Office at Easter Compton

- Location within Gloucestershire
- OS grid reference: ST573823
- Civil parish: Almondsbury
- Unitary authority: South Gloucestershire
- Ceremonial county: Gloucestershire
- Region: South West
- Country: England
- Sovereign state: United Kingdom
- Post town: BRISTOL
- Postcode district: BS35
- Dialling code: 01454
- Police: Avon and Somerset
- Fire: Avon
- Ambulance: South Western
- UK Parliament: Thornbury and Yate

Easter Compton is a village in the civil parish of Almondsbury, South Gloucestershire, England. It is situated at the bottom of a hill (known as Blackhorse Hill) near Junction 17 of the M5 Motorway on the B4055 road.

The village is only 1.5 miles away from 'The Mall' shopping centre and leisure complex at Cribbs Causeway. There is a pub (The Fox), a post office (open Monday/Wednesday/Friday in the mornings and based in the village hall), Methodist chapel, bowling alley, and a playing field (including skate park). It is served by the church of Compton Greenfield, as well as the chapel in the village. The B4055 road leads to Pilning, Redwick and Severn Beach.

The National Cycle Network runs through the village on its way to the Severn Bridge by which it is possible to enter Wales on foot or bicycle. There are some walks locally which give great views of the surrounding countryside, especially from the top of Spaniorum Hill. Each year in June, the village holds a carnival. The main road through the village is closed and the carnival procession finishes on the playing field where the floats are judged and various entertainments and stalls are available. In 2006, due to insurance restrictions, the carnival, previously drawn by lorries and vans provided by a local haulage firm, was restricted to non-motorised transport and the traditional throwing of water and flour was forbidden. In recent times the carnival has been cancelled due to the pandemic.

The village also puts on a large fireworks display on 5 November to mark Guy Fawkes Night.

Bristol Zoo is planning to open a large zoological and adventure park in woodland which it owns adjacent to Blackhorse Hill.

The Wave Bristol, a park with a 200 metre long artificial wave pool for surfing opened near the village in 2019.
