= Adventure Parc Snowdonia =

Artificial wave pool in the Conwy valley, Wales

Adventure Parc
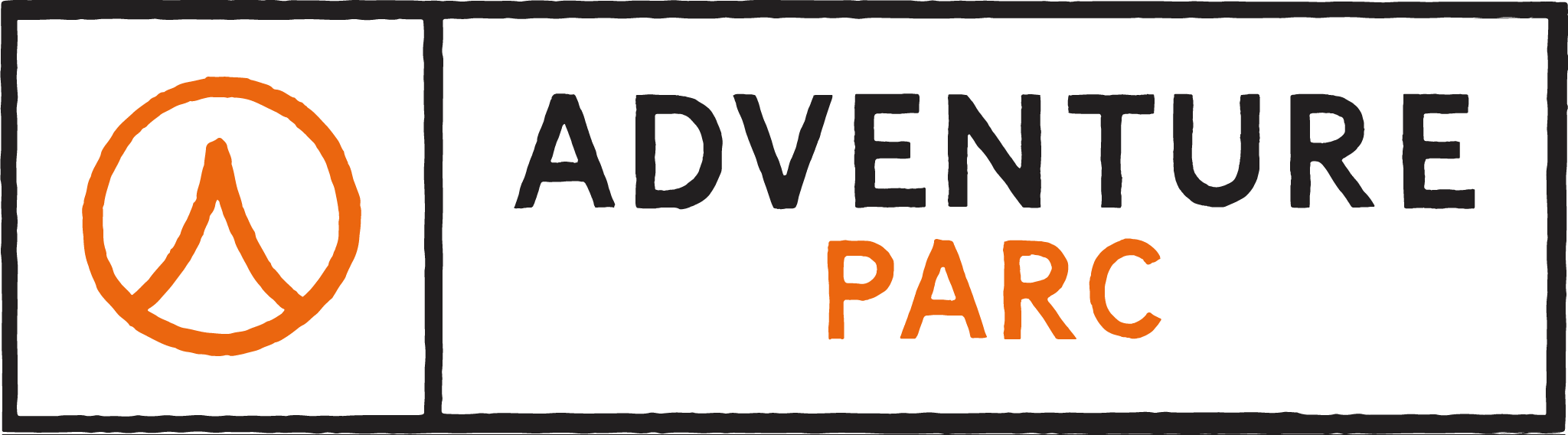
- Interactive map of Adventure Parc
- Location: Dolgarrog
- Coordinates: 53°11′24″N 3°50′28″W
- Owner: Adventure Parc Ltd
- Opened: 1 August 2015
- Closed: September 2023 - Reopened September 2025
- Previous names: Surf Snowdonia & Adventure Parc Snowdonia
- Area: Conwy
- Website: www.adventureparc.co.uk

Adventure Parc, formerly Surf Snowdonia, is an adventure park and tourist attraction in Dolgarrog in the Conwy valley, North Wales. The park incorporated an artificial wave pool and was owned by Conwy Adventure Leisure Ltd. It was the world's first commercial artificial surfing lake. The site cost a total of £12 million and opened in August 2015. The park closed in September 2023 following mechanical failures in 2022, which led to the waves being turned off, and searches for financial investment.

The site reopened as an indoor and outdoor activities centre in September, 2025. The Parc is now owned by The Interesting Hotels Group.

== History ==
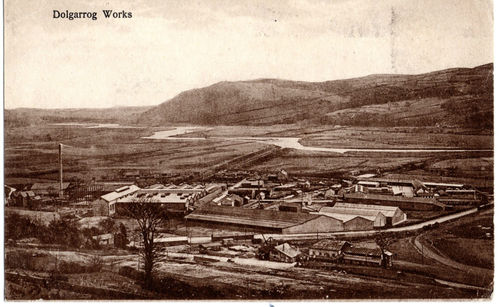
The former aluminium factory at Dolgarrog, as seen in this postcard picture from the early 1920s, is now the site of Surf Snowdonia. The access road (bottom right) remains in the same position.

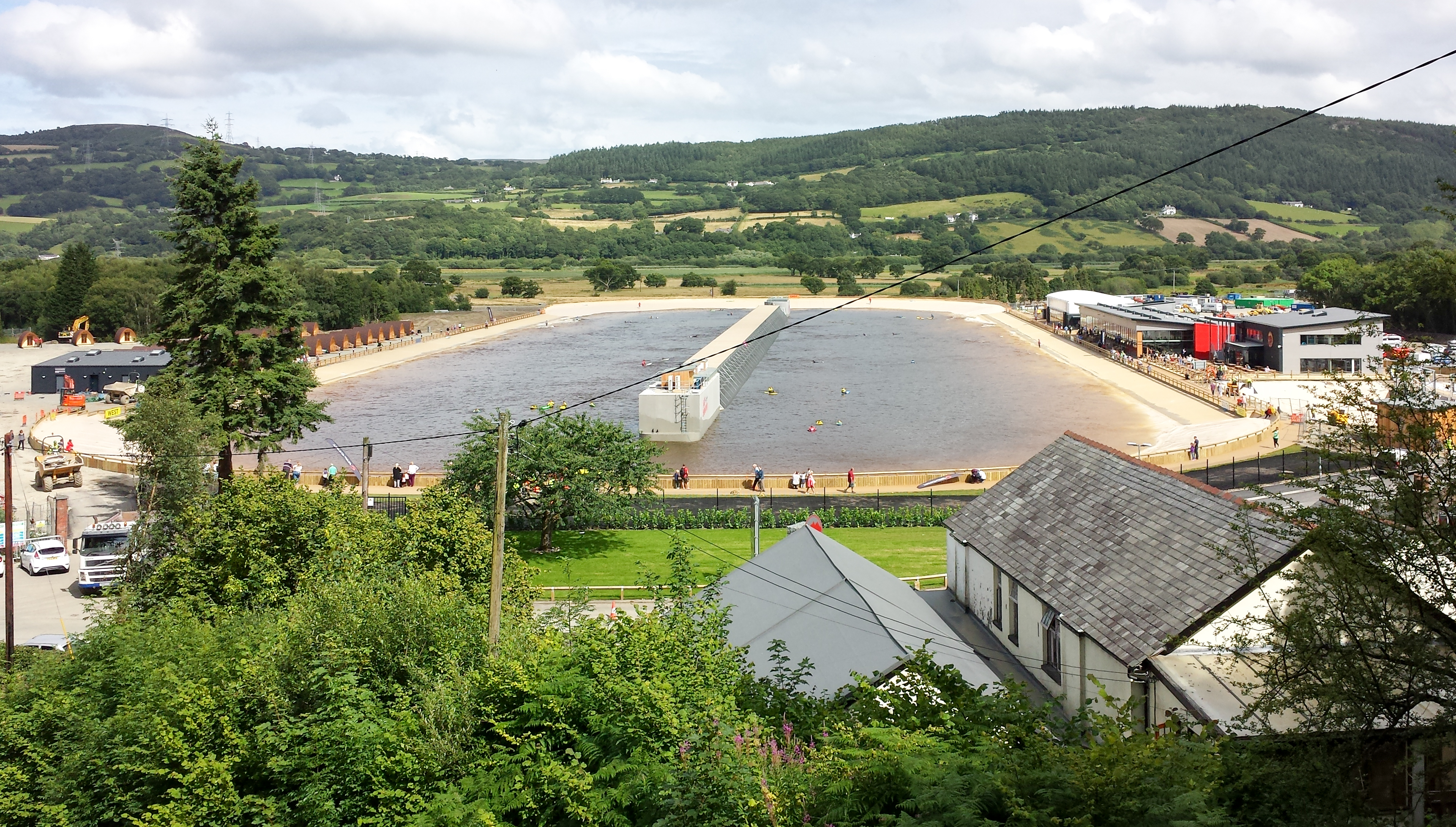
The surfing lake and park from the west

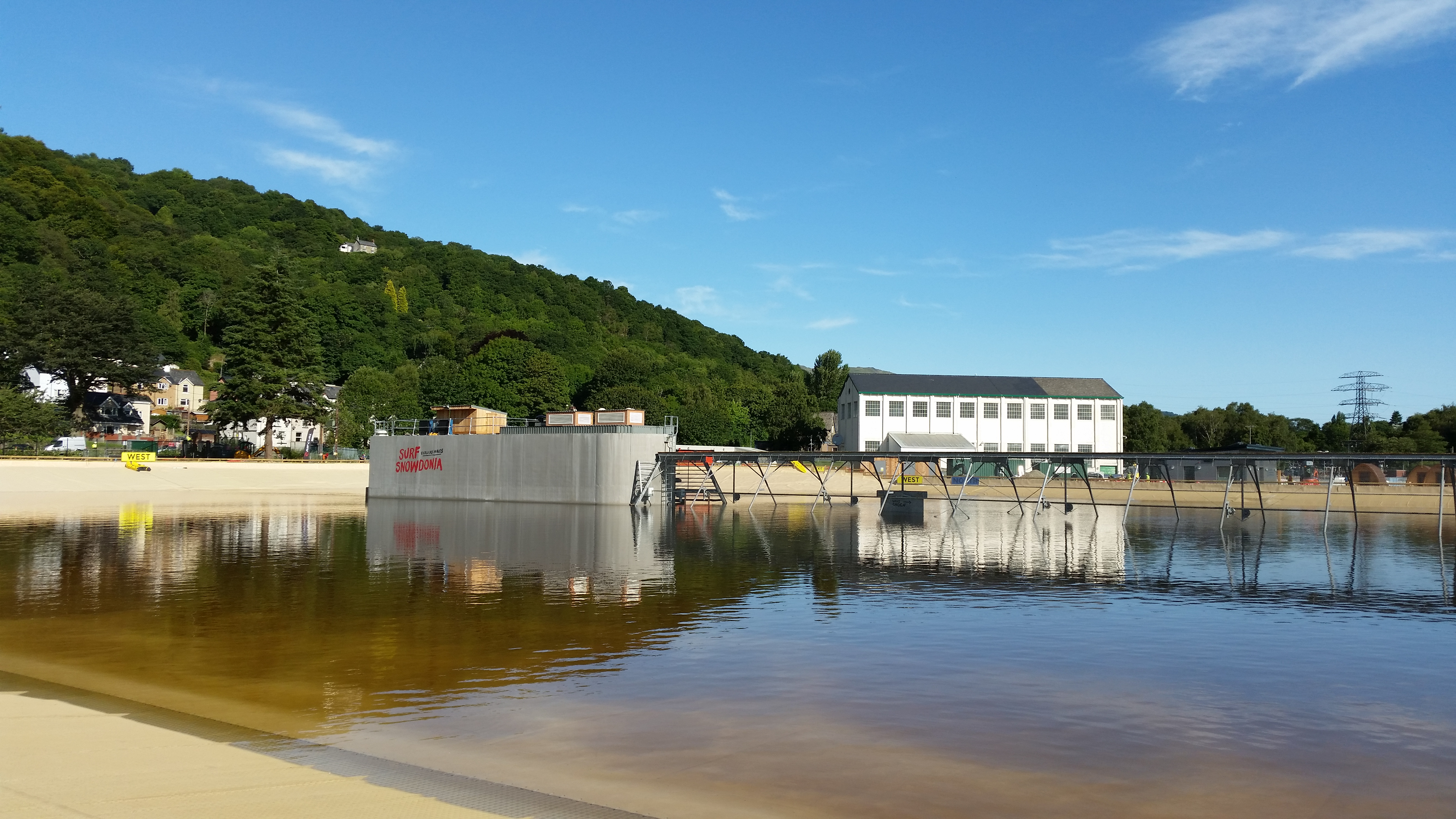
The lagoon at Surf Snowdonia, looking west

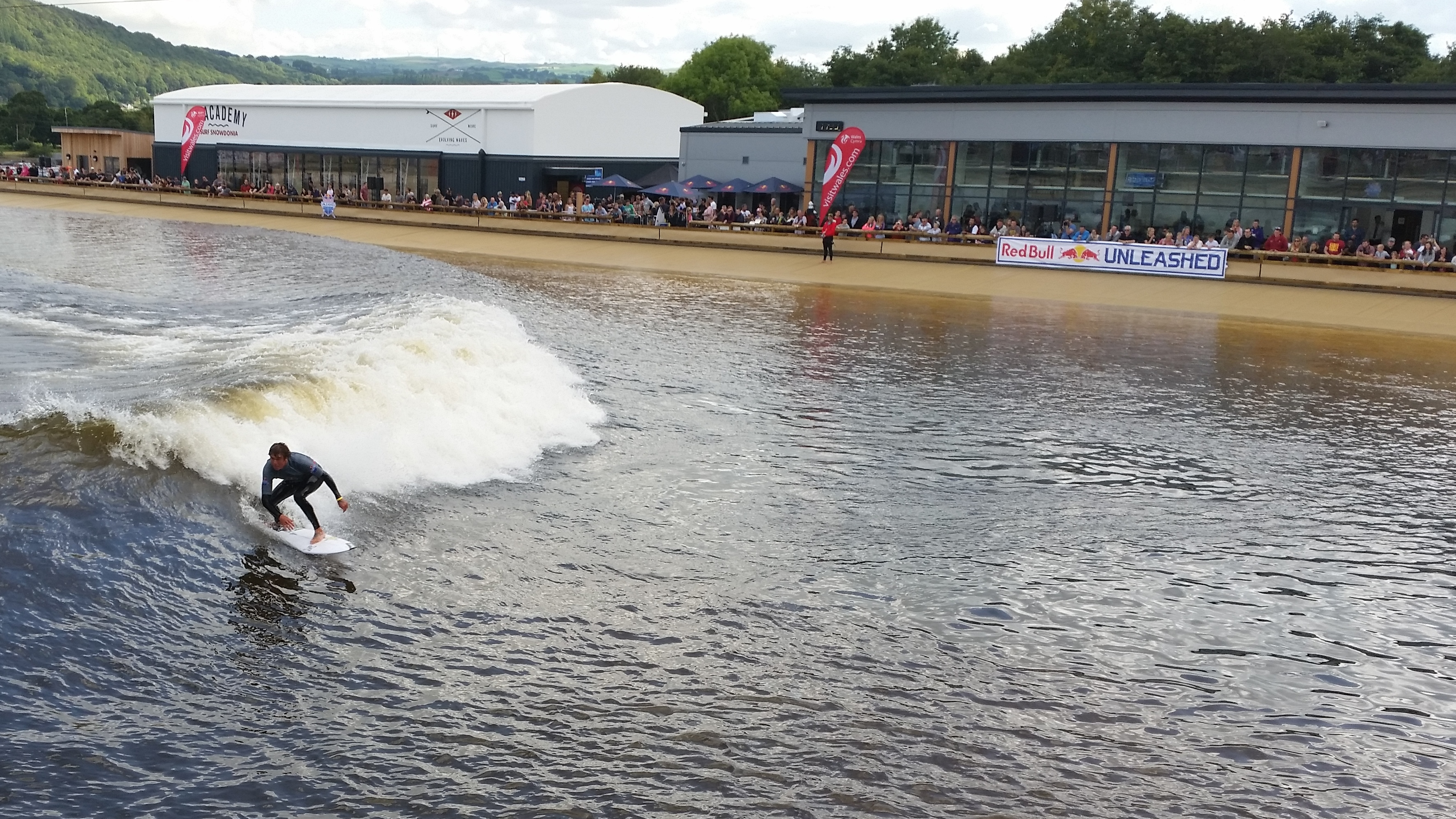
Surfing at Surf Snowdonia

In 2007 Dolgarrog Aluminium closed, and the following year the site was purchased by Ainscough Johnston, a Lancashire-based strategic land company, whose initial plans were for housing – including affordable housing – and for leisure and amenity uses.

Plans for a surfing attraction were unveiled in 2013, with Conwy Adventure Leisure announcing that it was submitting a planning application for the venue. The company predicted the facility would "attract 67–70,000 visitors [a year]". Conwy Adventure Leisure received planning permission in August 2013 and in December said it had invested over £7 million in the project. The park gained final approval from councillors in April 2014, with construction beginning in May. In June the project received £4 million in funding from the Welsh Government. Much initial decontamination work had to be undertaken, following a century of use as an industrial site, and over 25,000 cubic metres of on-site material was crushed and re-used during the construction, including the recycling of 400 tonnes of steel, cast iron and copper.

Development of the site was also complicated by environmental issues: it is adjacent to a Site of Special Scientific Interest, there is a high water table, and it is located on the flood plain of the River Conwy. A total of 6.3 miles of piling was driven into the ground in order to stabilize it.

In April 2015 a fire broke out on the construction site, causing some damage to a tower. The site opened to the public on 1 August 2015, having cost a total of £12 million. It served 14,000 people in its first two weeks of operation, including 3,500 people who surfed in the pool.

The site closed in summer 2023, after its wave machine had been turned off in 2022 following mechanical failures.

In 2025, the site was acquired by the Interesting Hotels Group. The park was reopened as an indoor and outdoor activities centre in September, 2025.

== Pool ==
Surf Snowdonia had a freshwater pool which contained a wave-generation mechanism, manufactured by the Leitner Group, and based on a prototype built in San Sebastián, Spain, by Wavegarden. It has a contoured base that could generate three different sized waves, at a rate of one a minute. The pool could generate a 2-metre (6 ft 7 in) high wave which lasted 16 seconds and travelled 150 metres (490 ft). The company claimed this was the longest man-made surf wave in the world. The pool was filled with rainwater collected from Snowdonia reservoirs including Llyn Cowlyd. This water passed through the adjacent hydro-power station, originally built to power the former aluminium plant, before being pumped from the tail-race into the surfing pool.

The pool is 300 metres (980 ft) long and 110 metres (360 ft) wide, containing a total of six million gallons of water. A bi-directional snowplough-shaped wave-generation mechanism, towed on a cable between the two central towers, moved up and down the pool on a three-rail track, generating the waves. The underwater machinery, powered by a 2MW motor, is covered with a protective stainless steel netted screen, to keep surfers from any moving parts, while not impairing the energy of the waves. The water in the pool was cleaned and cycled every 24 hours by passing through ultraviolet cleaners, so that the water can be chlorine-free.

The wave pool could be used by as many as 52 surfers at one time.

== Other attractions ==
As well as the wave pool, since the park expanded to become Adventure Parc Snowdonia, it offered indoor attractions such as ninja assault courses, a high ropes course, soft play, and caving, and outdoor attractions including a zip line, climbing wall, and bike hire.

== Staff and facilities ==
The managing director during its constructions and initial opening phase was Steve Davies MBE, previously Director of the National Railway Museum in York.

The facility employs some 109 people. with an additional 48 for the restaurant and bar.

Other facilities on site included a surfing academy, Adrenaline indoors, a zip wire over the lagoon, a café bar and coffee shop, a play shack for children, a retail area, and 36 wooden camping pods. Additional accommodation is available at a 106-bedroom Ixora Hotel & Spa.

== Reception ==
In the first week, the centre received up to 1,000 visitors a day. In its first season, prior to winter closure in 2015, the surf lagoon was booked at an average of 97% occupancy.

Reaction to the facility from professional surfers was favourable.

== Events ==
On 18–19 September 2015 Surf Snowdonia hosted Red Bull Unleashed, the world's first stadium surf contest, with 24 surfers from around the world. The event, watched by 2,000 spectators on the final day, was won by Hawaiian surfer Albee Layer.

On 24 October 2016 Surf Snowdonia hosted the first Surf Snowdonia Pro UK Surf Challenge, when the UK's top male, female and junior surfers competed in a knock-out competition.

== See also ==
- The Wave: Bristol
