= Live 8 concert, Eden Project =

On 2 July 2005 a Live 8 concert was held at the Eden Project, Cornwall, United Kingdom. The event was dubbed "Africa Calling", but was also known as "LIVE 8: Africa Calling" or "Africa Calling: LIVE 8 at the Eden Project".

The event was initiated by Eden Project Chief Executive Tim Smit as an essential element of the global event and in response to the criticism of the absence of African artists in the other nine concerts. It was organised and project managed by Eden Staff led by Howard Jones (Director of Human Networks, Eden Project) with Chris Hines (at the time Eden's Director of Sustainability) and the involvement of artists was coordinated by Peter Gabriel. At first it was not part of the Live 8 events. Gabriel later contacted Bob Geldof, one of the main organisers of Live 8, and the Africa Calling concert became part of the wider event.

The concert was aired live on the BBC's interactive/digital network. A DVD of 130 minutes of Live8: Africa Calling was released on 25 October 2005.

== Lineup ==
Open Air Stage

Masters of Ceremony: Peter Gabriel & Johnny Kalsi

- 1:00 – 1:20 pm: Ayub Ogada & Uno
- 1:40 – 2:20 pm: Mariza
- 2:45 – 3:30 pm: Thomas Mapfumo & The Blacks Unlimited
- 3:45 – 4:00 pm: Coco Mbassi
- 4:20 – 4:45 pm: Modou Diouf & O Fogum
- 5:15 – 5:55 pm: Youssou N'Dour and Le Super Étoile de Dakar (duet with Dido)
- 6:10 – 6:25 pm: Geoffrey Oryema
- 6:45 – 7:25 pm: Angelique Kidjo
- 7:45 – 8:30 pm: Tinariwen
- 8:55 – 9:30 pm: Kanda Bongo Man
- 10:00 – 10:40 pm: Daara J
- 10:40 – 11:00 pm: Finale

Biome Stage

- 1:20 – 1:40 pm: Chartwell Dutiro
- 2:20 – 2:45 pm: Maryam Mursal (First Performance)
- 3:30 – 3:45 pm: Maryam Mursal (Second Performance)
- 4:00 – 4:20 pm: Shikisha
- 4:45 – 5:15 pm: Siyaya
- 5:55 – 6:10 pm: Emmanuel Jal
- 6:25 – 6:45 pm: Coco Mbassi
- 7:25 – 7:45 pm: Ayub Ogada
- 7:50 – 8:05 pm: Chartwell Dutiro
- 8:30 – 8:55 pm: Frititi
- 9:30 – 10:00 pm: Akim El Sikameya
