= The Wave (company) =

Artificial surfing lake in South Gloucestershire, England

Coordinates: 51°32′32″N 2°36′20″W

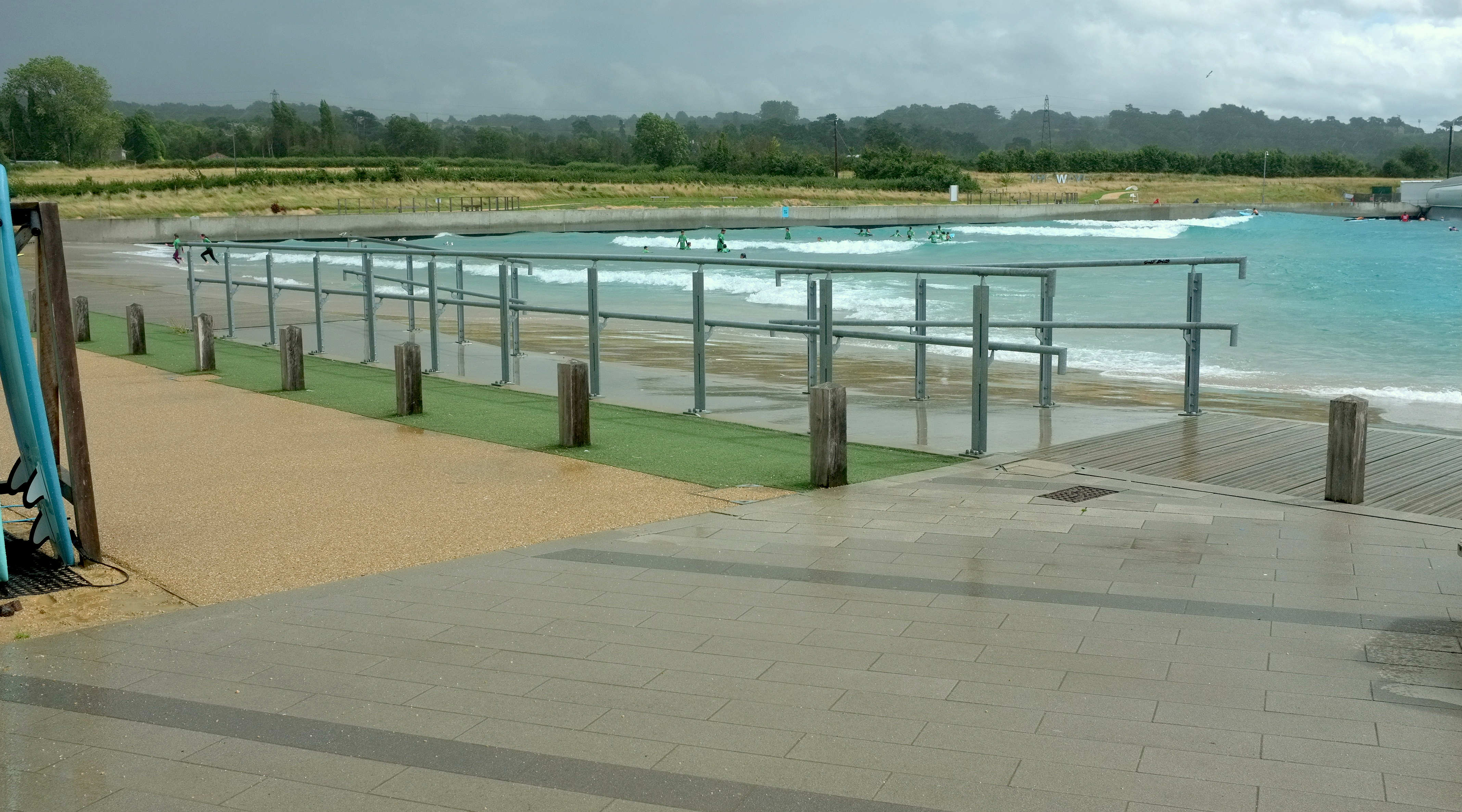
The Wave: Bristol

The Wave is a firm building artificial wave pools for surfing in England. The Wave: Bristol was opened in 2019, on the northern outskirts of the city. A second site, The Wave: London, is planned.

== Development ==
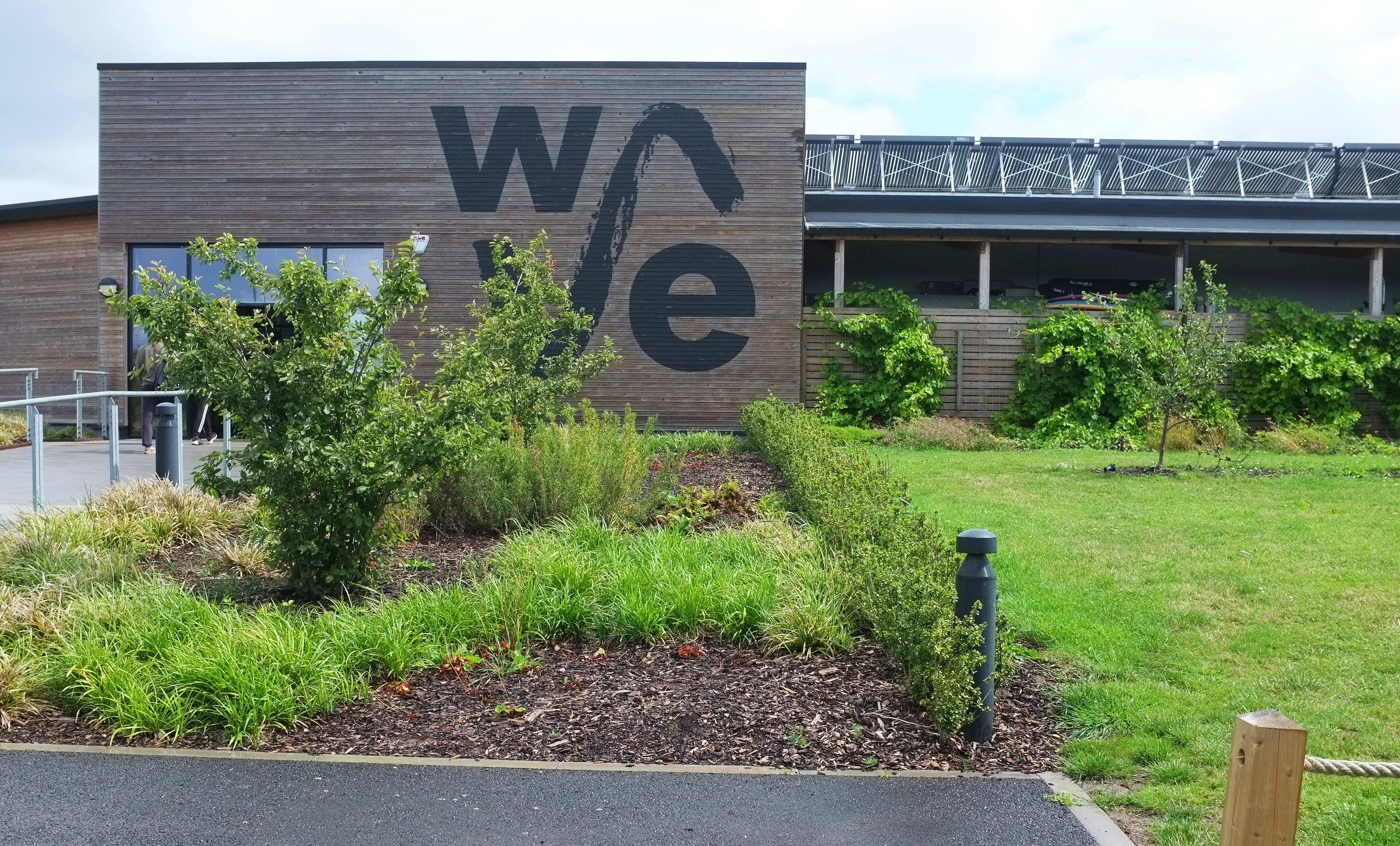
Exterior view

The founder of the project is Nick Hounsfield. The project was named "The Wave: Bristol" in 2012, initially focusing on a site next to the Portway in Bristol. This site was rejected as it was not big enough. A 70-acre (28 ha) site on farmland at Easter Compton was selected in 2013, with artificial wave generation technology supplied by the Spanish company Wavegarden. A sustainability agenda for The Wave was created by Chris Hines.

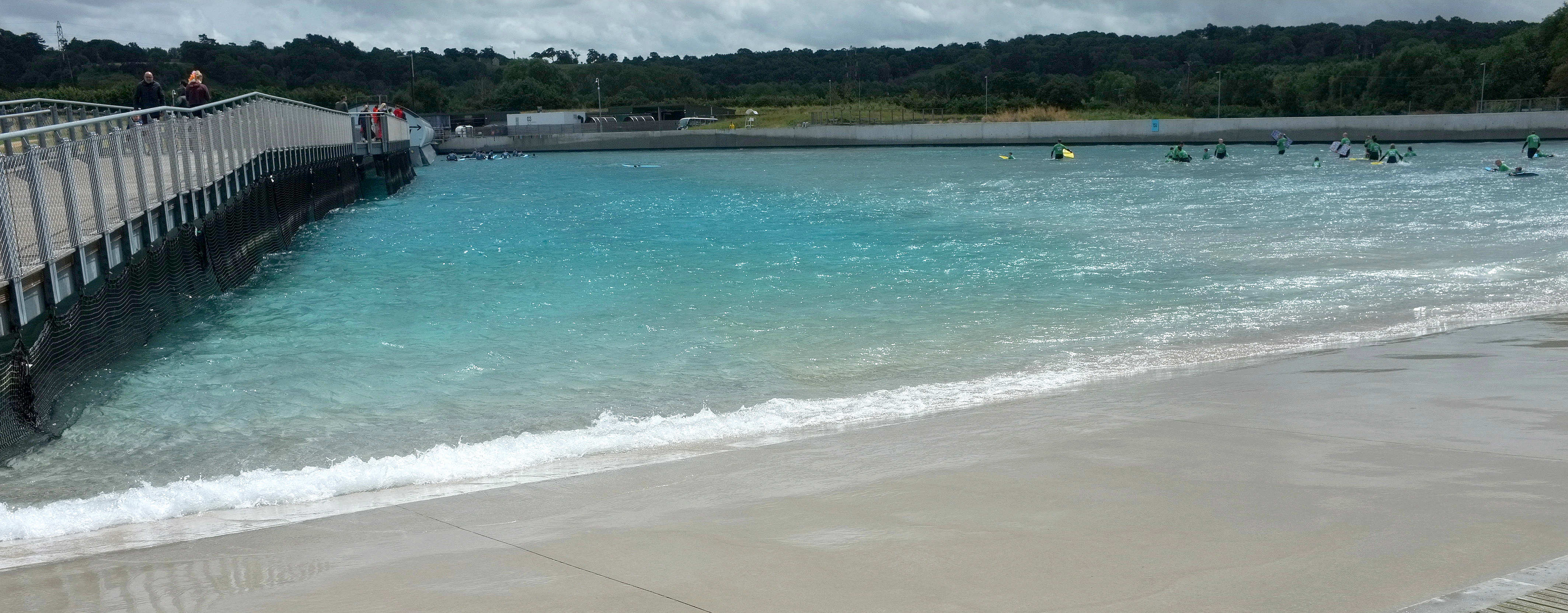
Water pool

In August 2017, South Gloucestershire Council approved the £20 million scheme, which is designed to prioritise sustainability. In October 2019 construction was completed.

== Setting ==
The Wave offers different sizes and styles of wave to suit different abilities, from 0.5-metre (1 ft 8 in) white water to 2-metre (6 ft 7 in) barrelling waves. The pool is divided into right and left sections, with waves breaking in opposite directions on each side.

The wave pool can provide up to 1,000 waves per hour. There is space for up to eighty users at a time. The dimensions of the pool are 300 metres (980 ft) long by 100 metres (330 ft) wide and 1.5 metres (4 ft 11 in) deep.

Besides the wave pool, the scheme includes a clubhouse, lake, restaurant, camping ground, woodland trails, and gardens.

=== Renewable energy ===
In 2023, The Wave installed an on-site solar array, which they claim will produce enough electricity to match demand from the facility. The waves themselves are generated using only sustainable energy.

== See also ==
- Surf Snowdonia
- Lost Shore Surf Resort
