= Wavegarden =

Spanish engineering company

Wavegarden S.L.U.
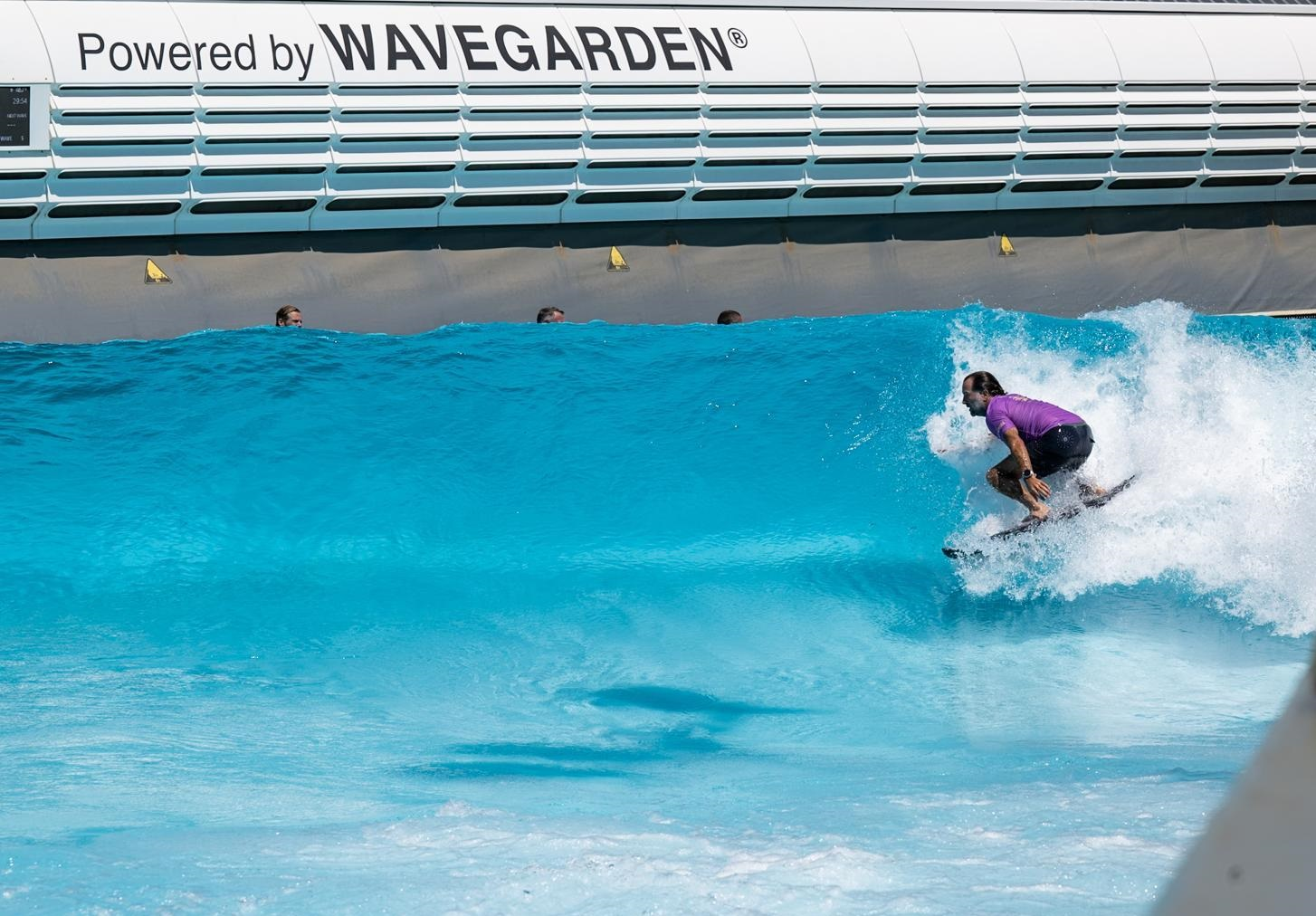
- A professional surfer in the Tel Aviv Wavegarden surf park
- Type: Private
- Industry: Sport, leisure, surf
- Founded: 2005
- Founder: José Manuel Odriozola, Karin Frisch
- Headquarters: Donostia - San Sebastián, Spain
- Products: Wave generators for surfing
- Services: Research, design, manufacture, installation, commissioning and promotion of wave generating systems and lagoons for surfing
- Number of employees: 80
- Website: Wave Garden

Wavegarden SL is an engineering company dedicated to the research, design, manufacturing, installation, commissioning, and promotion of wave-generating systems and lagoons for surfing. The company's headquarters are in the Basque Country near San Sebastián, Northern Spain. The company employs over 60 full-time staff with departments in mechanical, civil, and electrical engineering, fluid dynamics, software development, water treatment, architecture, business development, and operations. All technologies are developed in-house and the company holds a range of international patents.

Today, six Wavegarden surf parks are in operation: Adventure Park Snowdonia, North Wales; The Wave Bristol, England; URBNSURF in Melbourne, Sydney, Australia; Wavepark, Sihueng, South Korea; Alaia Bay, Sion, Switzerland and Lost Shore Surf Resort, Edinburgh, Scotland. Other Wavegarden surf parks are under construction in Brazil: Praia da Grama in San Paulo and Surfland in Garopaba. A further 30 projects are being developed in countries across five continents.

In August 2025, Atlantic Park Surf in Virginia Beach, Virginia, became the first facility in North America to use the company's Wavegarden Cove technology.

== History ==
Wavegarden was founded in 2005 in San Sebastián, Spain by spouses Josema Odriozola (Engineer) and Karin Frisch (Sports Economist), both avid surfers, who aimed to reproduce an authentic surfing experience beyond the ocean. Their objective was to find a way to share surfing with more people around the world by fusing science and creativity. This eventually led to the creation of modern-day surfing lagoons with unlimited ocean-like waves.

=== 2005-2009 Research phase ===
Different artificial wave prototypes for surfing are explored, both circular and linear.

=== 2010 First man-made waves are produced in Spain ===
The first surfable ocean-like wave was constructed. The system comprises a hydrodynamic wavefoil that moves at the floor level, leading to the formation of a breaking wave. Bewildered by the unusual sight of waves breaking in a mountain backdrop, a range of top professionals, including former world champions Mick Fanning, Gabriel Medina, make folklore by surfing the artificial knee-high waves.

=== 2012-13 Creation of Wavegarden Lagoon ===
Creation of the first bi-directional surfing lagoon with perfect left and right hand waves. The demo model measures 220 x 50m and has a bidirectional wavefoil. It creates 120 waves per hour that stand 1.20 m (4.25 ft) high and last for 20 seconds. Professional surfers Taj Burrow and Dane Reynolds validate the surfability of the waves.

=== 2015 First Wavegarden Lagoon opens in the U.K ===
Opening of the world's first public Wavegarden surfing facility Surf Snowdonia in North Wales, U.K. Developed by Conwy Adventure Leisure Ltd. for £12 million. In the first 12 months, visitation reached 150,000 people, with 30,000 waves being created. The first international surf event in a wave pool, the Red Bull Unleashed, was staged and won by Hawaiian surfer Albee Layer. In 2019, Surf Snowdonia modified its trading name to Adventure Parc Snowdonia.

=== 2016 Second Wavegarden Lagoon opens in USA ===
Opening of the second public surfing facility featuring a Wavegarden Lagoon in Austin, Texas.

=== 2016-2017 Construction of First Wavegarden Cove demo model ===
Construction of the first Wavegarden Cove demo facility, a technology capable of making up to 1000 waves per hour. The modular electro mechanical system marks a departure from the wavefoil system and its limitations of wave frequency and variety. Wave settings are adjustable with the aid of a customized software program and a push-button control panel.

=== 2019 42 module first full-size Wavegarden Cove opens in Bristol, England ===
The world’s first commercial Wavegarden Cove facility opened to the public: The Wave Bristol, England, UK. A £25 million project, based in Easter Compton.

=== 2020 46 module Wavegarden Cove opens in Melbourne, Australia ===
URBNSURF Melbourne, Australia becomes the second Wavegarden Cove to open publicly. Located in Tullamarine, adjacent the Melbourne airport, the park spans 2.2 hectares, can generate up to 30 different wave types and has a surfer capacity of 84 surfers per hour. 1 The park adopted a utilitarian and sustainable design approach by using 18,000 ton of recycled concrete to form the base and walls of the lagoon, making it the largest recycled concrete structure in Australia. Melbourne-born Hollywood star Chris Hemsworth joined professional surfers Julian Wilson and Sally Fitzgibbons at the opening ceremony. Visitation for the first quarter of 2020 was recorded at 65,000 people.

=== 56 module Wavegarden Cove opens in Siheung, South Korea ===
Wave Park is Asia’s biggest surf park and the centerpiece of a new luxury marine complex. Located just 30 min. from Seoul’s Int. Incheon Airport is the largest Wavegarden Cove built to date. Wave Park is located on a new 167,000 m2 waterfront development on Turtle Island. The first stage of the project was completed in just 18 months and provides aquatic activities like kayaking, SUP and swimming in zones with and without waves. Stage 2 of the development includes six hotels, convention centers, marinas and museums.

=== March 2021 Wavegarden arrives in the Swiss Alps ===
On 1 May 2021, Alaia Bay opened in Sion, Switzerland. It is the first surf pool open to the public in mainland Europe.

=== July 2021 The first Wavegarden of Americas is set to open in Brazil ===
The first surf park of Latin America is located in the countryside 45 minutes from Sao Paulo.

=== April 2025 the largest Wavegarden in the Middle East will open in TEL Aviv, Israel ===
SRF Park TLV opened in the heart of Tel Aviv, establishing Israel’s first large-scale artificial surf lagoon with 30 different wave types designed for surfers of all levels. The facility represents a new chapter in wave pool development in the Middle East, accessible year-round with professional instructors and advanced technology.

=== 2025 Atlantic Park Surf opens in Virginia Beach, United States ===
Atlantic Park Surf opened to the public in Virginia Beach, Virginia, on 16 August 2025, becoming the first Wavegarden Cove facility in North America. The distinction applies specifically to the Cove system; NLand Surf Park in Texas had previously opened with Wavegarden's earlier Lagoon technology in 2016.

The 2.67-acre (1.08 ha) surfing lagoon uses a 46-module Cove system. It can generate up to 1,000 waves per hour and offers more than 20 wave profiles, with heights ranging from approximately one to seven feet (0.3 to 2.1 m). Sessions are offered throughout the year and can accommodate between 20 and 40 surfers, depending on the selected wave profile. The lagoon's wave-generating machinery was manufactured in Spain, transported to Virginia in approximately 50 shipping containers and assembled on site.

The lagoon is the centerpiece of Atlantic Park, a $350 million mixed-use development on the former site of the Virginia Beach Civic Center, commonly known as The Dome. The development was led by Venture Realty Group and Virginia Beach native Pharrell Williams as part of a public–private partnership involving the city and the Virginia Beach Development Authority. The wider development includes The Dome entertainment venue, apartments, restaurants and retail space, offices and a 20-room boutique hotel. Facilities immediately surrounding the lagoon include spectator areas, lounge chairs and cabanas.

== Technology ==
In 2010 Wavegarden established an R&D Center in the Basque Country, Spain and have maintained a strict approach to research ever since. Thanks to the full-size test facilities, Wavegarden’s engineers can thoroughly test technologies and products before they are brought to market. Computer simulations and scale model testing are performed prior to their transformation into full-size demo models.

Wavegarden has developed two different technologies to produce perfect surfing waves beyond the ocean: Wavegarden Lagoon (not available anymore) and The Wavegarden Cove. The new Wavegarden Cove technology marks a departure from standard foil systems. The machinery is modular, eschewing complicated hydraulic or pneumatic systems in favor of a smart and robust electro mechanical system. Each module unit has several devices that work in sequence to push out water. As the wave travels down the wave pool modules activate to push the wave further down the line.

A standard size facility like Urbnsurf Melbourne has 46 of these modules and offers rides up to 16 seconds long. Longer rides are possible in larger facilities. Consequently, very little energy is lost in the transmission of forces, which keeps running costs at a minimum and makes the Wavegarden Cove the most energy-efficient technology on the market today. The versatility of the technology allows to change wave height, shape and power in an instant to match the experience level of all surfers and allows to can adjust the number of waves to cater precisely for the number of surfers in the water. The size of a standard Wavegarden Cove facility measures 160x160m, although the footprint is fully customizable to all types of projects including stand-alone projects, mixed use schemes, surf resorts, private residential developments, hotels and commercial centers.

To keep the water crystal clear and hygienically safe, each Wavegarden Cove is supplied with its own state-of-the-art water treatment system. Developed in-house, the system is based on a series of sustainable treatments including fine filtration, ozone & UV disinfection, and low chemical chlorination. Wavegarden Cove facilities are fitted with the access points and amenities for the handicapped.

== Wavegarden surf lagoons ==
- On August 1, 2015 the first Wavegarden lagoon, Surf Snowdonia in Dolgarrog, North Wales, opened to the public.
- NLand Surf Park in Austin, Texas featured their second commercial lagoon when it opened for business on 7 Oct 2016.
- 2019 The Wave in Bristol, the first Wavegarden Cove lagoon opens to public.
- 2020 URBNSURF becomes Australia's first surf park opened to the public
- 2020 WAVE PARK, Asia’s biggest surf park is the centerpiece of a new luxury marine complex
- 2021 Alaïa Bay in Sion, Switzerland, the first Surf Park in Continental Europe has opened.
- 2021 Praia da Grama, an inland tropical surf beach in Brazil. The first surf park in the world is located inside a residential complex.
- 2024 Lost Shore Surf Resort has opened in Edinburgh, Scotland.
- 2025 Atlantic Park Surf opened in Virginia Beach, Virginia, becoming the first North American facility to use Wavegarden Cove technology.
