= NLand =

Inland surfing destination near Austin, Texas, US

NLand Surf Park
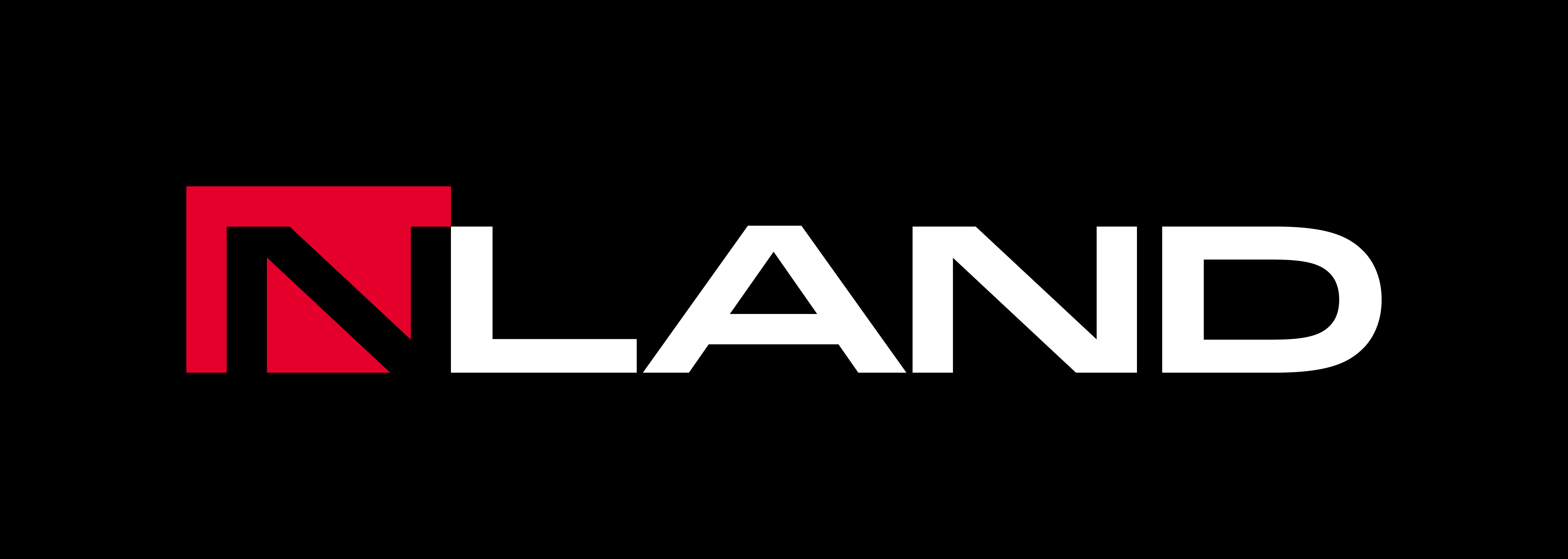
- Location: Del Valle, TX
- Coordinates: 30.1866574°N 97.5823262°W
- Theme: Wave pool
- Owner: World Surf League
- Opened: 7 October 2016
- Closed: 12 November 2018

NLand Surf Park is an inland surfing destination near Austin, Texas, located ten minutes from Austin-Bergstrom International Airport at 4836 East Highway 71, Del Valle, Texas 78617. The park offers surfing sessions, lessons, clinics, or group surfing for first-time, beginner, intermediate, and advanced surfers. In addition to the 14-acre surf lagoon and surrounding land, the park includes a surf shop and a restaurant (Blue Prairie), and a craft brewery (NLand Brewing Company).

NLand's surf lagoon is the largest man-made surf lagoon in North America. Founder Doug Coors partnered with Spanish engineering firm Wavegarden to design and build the wave pool lagoon, which offers six-foot-high waves as well as gentler waves for surfing and bodyboarding. NLand's waves provide rides of up to 35 seconds and surfers have the opportunity to catch a new wave every two minutes.

On January 8, 2019, the World Surf League purchased NLand.

== History ==
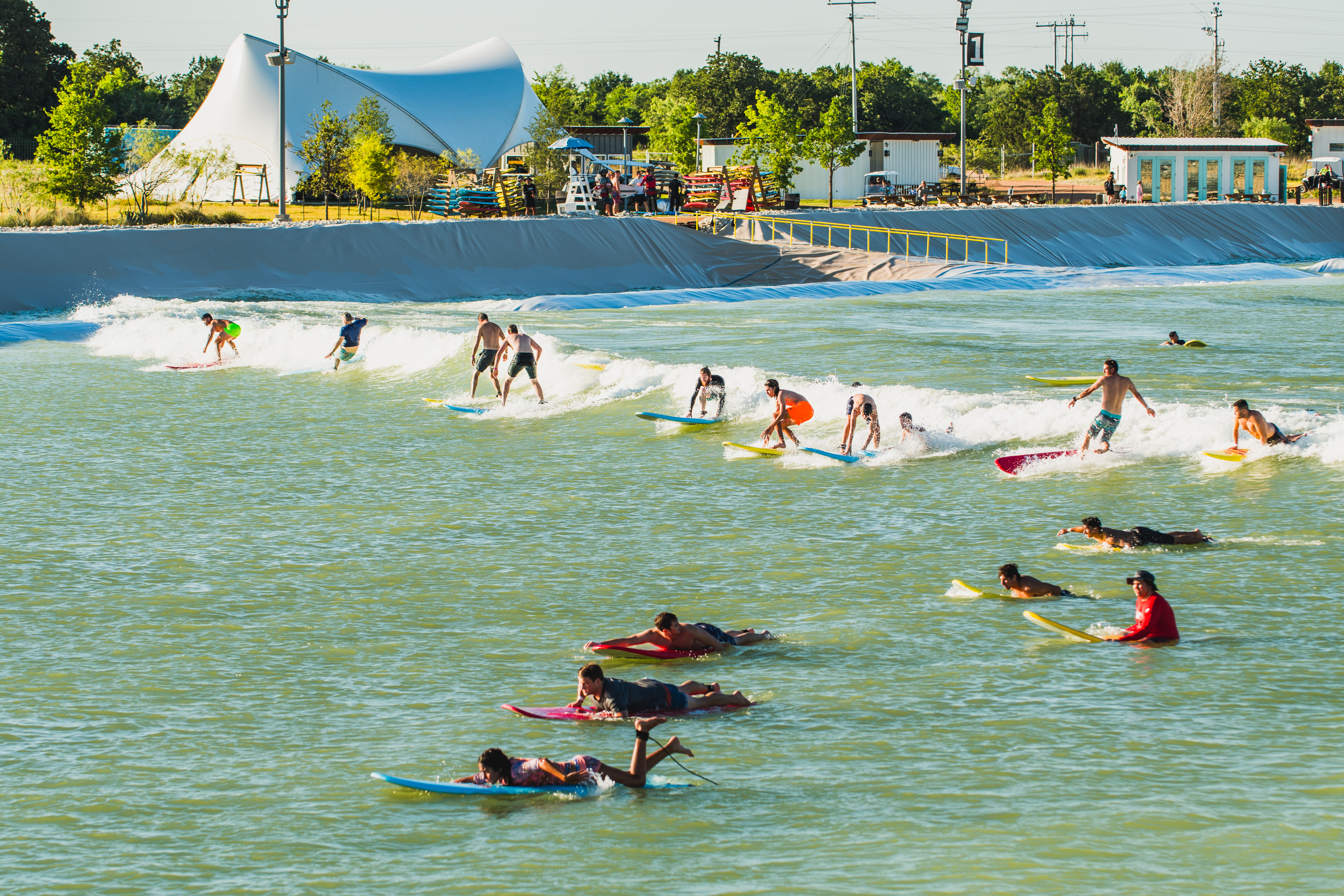
NLand guests surfing the Inside wave at the season opening in 2017.

Construction on NLand began in 2014 and was completed in 2016. The Travis County Commissions court delayed the park from opening in July 2016 due to a lawsuit filed citing regulatory concerns. NLand rebutted by filing a lawsuit in Federal Court stating the county has violated their constitutional right to equal protection of the law. NLand reached an agreement with state and local officials in October 2016 regarding how the park will be regulated. An injunction requiring strict water quality testing settled the opposing lawsuits between NLand and the county. The park opened to the public on October 7, 2016.

Shortly after opening, the park closed unexpectedly due to damage under the lagoon. The lagoon was drained to make repairs and water from the park spilled into neighboring properties. Six months later the park reopened to the public on Friday, May 12, 2017.

In January 2019, Nland was sold to the World Surf League who plans to re-open as a surfing location sometime in the near future.

== Lagoon ==
The lagoon is bisected by a pier. Each half of the lagoon is divided into zones according to wave height. The perimeter of the east side provides small, whitewater waves ideal for beginners. NLand refers to this area as the "Bay Wave." The west side of the lagoon provides a larger four-foot wave for intermediate surfers. NLand refers to this area as the "Inside Wave." The section closest to the pier on both the east and west sides provides the tallest wave, with a five-to-six-foot face, designed for advanced surfers. NLand refers to this area as the "Reef Wave".

A hydrofoil beneath the pier in the center of the lagoon at NLand produces the waves by pushing more than 11 million gallons of water through the lagoon. The technology is similar to the motor used on a ski lift. Coors describes it as a chairlift motor with a snow plow on it. The lagoon's customized bathymetry was designed by engineers from NLand and Wavegarden to optimize the shape of the waves for surfing.

== Environmental Conservation ==
=== Water Catchment ===
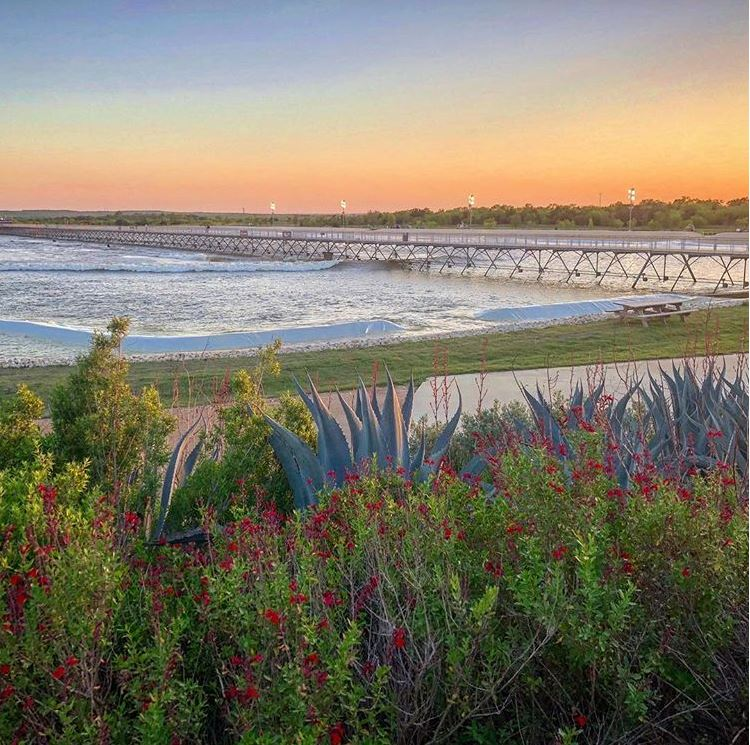
Native plants and grasses at NLand

NLand's engineering team and founder, Doug Coors, developed a solution to address the need for millions of gallons of water. The team started by digging a series of trenches for drainage pipes and channels for water to move. NLand uses a water catchment system that collects rainwater on the property to ensure the NLand lagoon is sustainable without drawing on precious water resources. Water from the park is channeled to a wet pond and bio-filtered by plants and aquatic life before it moves to a deep reservoir and through a filtration system for treatment.

=== Food Service ===
The onsite Blue Prairie restaurant uses compostable utensils, plates, bowls, and cups. In addition, NLand sources ingredients from local farms and ranches near Austin.
