= Drowning detection system =

Video monitoring or camera systems

Drowning detection systems are systems designed to improve safety by reducing drowning deaths and injuries in public and private pools, waterparks, thermal baths, spa facilities, beaches, or other natural bodies of water smart beach.

== Classification ==
Pool monitoring systems fall into two broad categories: Active or Passive.

=== Active systems ===
Active systems are often using a wearable on the swimmer, such as a wristband, that monitors the behaviour and position of the swimmer. If the swimmer is detected to be under water for a certain period, an alarm is triggered and through acoustic underwater communication from the wristband to receivers installed in the pool the alarm is transferred to on-site lifeguards that immediately can identify which pool and to start rescue. The advantage of such systems is that each person is guarded and that the same wristband can be used for access to facilities and lockers. The system is mainly used in public swimming pools where lifeguards are present.

=== Passive systems ===
Passive systems provide lifeguards with views of swimmer activity and behaviour below the water surface, which aids the 10:20 scan for identifying potential incidents. They offer a way of compensating for surface glare and blind spots in the swimming pool, thereby making the lifeguard's job easier. Active systems are designed to automatically monitor the pool and alert lifeguards to potential incidents.

Passive system underwater cameras let lifeguards inspect multiple underwater views simultaneously from a single location. Cameras can cover areas which may otherwise be obstructed. Below water cameras can be paired with above water cameras to provide face-to-body matching if there is an incident where a swimmer needs to be identified, in cases of sexual assault for example.
