= Coco Mbassi =

Cameroonian-born British musician

- Born: Constance Mbassi Manga; February 28, 1969 (age 57); Paris, France
- Origin: Cameroon
- Genres: world; acoustic; jazz; afro-folk
- Occupations: Singer; songwriter; composer; playwright
- Years active: 1989–present
- Labels: Night & Day; Unbounded Arts
- Website: www.cocombassi.co.uk

Coco Mbassi (born 28 February 1969) is a musical artist originating from Cameroon, born in Paris, France, and based in London, UK.

Winner of the Radio France Internationale Découvertes Prize in 1996 with the song "Muenge Mwa Ndolo", she toured worldwide and her first album, Sepia, was released in 2001. This album was nominated in 2002 for the BBC Radio 3 World Music Awards, and won the German World Music CD Critics' Awards. Her second album Sisea was released in 2003. After touring, she released a live tour DVD, Coco Mbassi Tour.

Prior to her solo career, she sang with various artists as a backing vocalist, live or in recording sessions (including with Salif Keita, the jazz band Sixun, Toure Kunda, Ray Lema)., and Manu Dibango.

Mbassi performed at Live 8, at the Eden Project, Cornwall.

A lover of music in general, some of her favourites are The Messiah of Handel, Stevie Wonder, Bob Marley and the Cameroonian artist Dina Bell.

Mbassi was on tour with Totem (Cirque du Soleil) as the lead female vocalist of the production in 2011.

Her latest release is the album Jóa (2014).

After being selected for the BEAM 2018 showcase, Coco Mbassi has written a musical called 'Haendel on the Estate' extracts of which were performed at Ovalhouse theatre in February 2019 as part of their First Bites Spring 2019 programme.

The singer also recently played the part of 'The Old Woman' in Cervantes Theatre's director Jorge de Juan García's adaptation of Lorca's famed play Yerma.
