= Chris Hines (environmentalist) =

British surfer and environmental activist

- Occupation: Activist, consultant
- Employer: Eden Project (2001–2007); Surfers Against Sewage (1990–2000)
- Awards: Member of the Order of the British Empire (For services to the Environment, 2008); honorary doctorate (Honorary Doctorate of Science, 2011, University of Plymouth); honorary degree (2025, Royal Holloway, University of London)

Christopher Ian Hines MBE is a British surfer and environmental activist. He is a co-founder of Surfers Against Sewage and led on sustainability policy for the Eden Project.

== Career ==
Hines was raised in Devon and educated at Tavistock Comprehensive School.

He is a co-founder of the lobbying group and marine conservation charity Surfers Against Sewage, established in 1990, and served as their Director of Campaigns for its first ten years.

In November 1997 he gave evidence to a government select committee looking at issues around sewage processing. He was also a special advisor to Michael Meacher in the latter's role as Secretary of State for the Environment. (Note: Michael Meacher was Secretary of State for the Environment from May 1997 to June 2003.)

He was Sustainability Director—the first in that role—at the Eden Project from 2001 to 2007. While there, he played a major role in organising the "Africa Calling" concert as part of Live 8. He was also instrumental in the establishment of The Wave: Bristol, an artificial surfing pool opened in 2019, having responsibility for its sustainability policy.

He now runs his own sustainability consultancy company, "A Grain of Sand".

== Recognition ==
Hines was runner-up in the 1999 Green Politics Award. In 2006, he was jointly awarded (alongside Glenn Hening of the Surfrider Foundation) The Surfer's Path magazine's "Emerald Path" award for work at the Eden Project to develop biodegradable surfboards, using balsa, hemp and plant-based resin.

In 2008 Hines was appointed a Member of the Order of the British Empire "for services to the environment".

He holds an Honorary Doctorate of Science awarded by the University of Plymouth in 2011 and in 2025 Royal Holloway, University of London awarded him an honorary degree "for his commitment to protecting England's seas and waterways".

Hines was portrayed by Tom Durant-Pritchard in the 2026 TV drama Dirty Business, about illegal sewage releases by water companies.
