= Alan Stokes =

British surfer

- Born: 19 January 1981 (age 45); United Kingdom
- Other names: Stokesy
- Occupation: Surfer

Alan Stokes (born 19 January 1981) is a British professional surfer and surf model from Newquay, Cornwall. He won the 2009 UK Pro Surf Tour Championships.

He is a model for surf clothing in the UK. He is sponsored by Animal Clothing & Wetsuits, Creatures of Leisure Hardware, Quiver Surfboards, Luke Hart Shapes, Future Fins, and Maxi Muscle.

== Results/achievements ==
- 2003 Animal Beach Ball Shortboard Overall 1st
- 2004 British Pro Tour Shortboard Overall 1st
- 2004 British National Championships Shortboard Overall 1st
- 2004 Animal Beach Ball Shortboard Overall 1st
- 2004 UK Pro Surf Tour Champion
- 2005 English National Championships Shortboard Overall 1st
- 2005 Animal Beach Ball Shortboard Overall 1st
- 2005 British Pro Tour Newquay Shortboard Overall 1st
- 2005 British National Championships Shortboard Overall 1st
- 2006 British Pro Tour event three Shortboard Overall 1st
- 2009 Relentless Boardmasters 5th
- 2009 UK Pro Surf Tour Champion

== External links and sources ==
- Profile
- Surf Newquay
- UK based blog
