= Surfers Against Sewage =

Marine conservation charity in the UK

- Founded: 1990
- Purpose: Environmental
- Location: St Agnes, Cornwall
- Region served: United Kingdom
- Members: 20,000+
- Key people: Jon Khoo, Chair
- Revenue: £3m
- Website: sas.org.uk

Surfers Against Sewage (SAS) is a marine conservation charity working with communities to protect oceans, waves, beaches and marine life. It was created in 1990 by a group of Cornish surfers from the villages of St Agnes and Porthtowan on the north coast of Cornwall.

== History ==
Set up as a single-issue campaign group in 1990, Surfers Against Sewage led a nationwide campaign for improved water quality. Their campaign's success was helped by key pieces of EU legislation including the Bathing Water Directive.

In 2012, Surfers Against Sewage was recognised as a national marine conservation charity focused on the protection of waves, oceans, beaches, marine wildlife and coastal communities.

In 2018 it was one of the seven charities nominated by Prince Harry and Meghan Markle to receive donations in lieu of wedding presents.

== Campaigns ==
Today the organisation represents an expanding supporter base and campaigns on a diverse range of issues. SAS campaigns for both the UK's coastal environment and the health of all surfers and other recreational waters users. Recently, SAS has expanded its remit into the protection of the wave resource and surfing spots through the Protect Our Waves (POW) campaign. Since 1990, SAS has secured a multitude of campaign successes on behalf of all water users.

=== Plastic free coastlines ===
More recently, Surfers Against Sewage have turned their attention to battling the new sewage - plastic pollution. Through national initiatives such as the Big Spring Beach Clean and the Autumn Beach Clean Series they hope to empower communities to protect their coastlines. Further up in the chain of events, SAS are using their Waves All-Party Parliamentary Group (APPG) to encourage politicians to explore and introduce policies to prevent plastic emissions from entering the environment.

=== Protect Our Waves ===
SAS launched the Protect Our Waves campaign to increase public awareness to the importance of waves in the socioeconomic fabric of many UK coastal communities. Behind the scenes SAS has been consistently representing surfers and waveriders on rights of access, and ensuring the wave resource is recognised and valued.

=== E. coli survey ===
Surfers Against Sewage helped recruit participants for a University of Exeter study on the prevalence of antibiotic-resistant E. coli in surfers and bodyboarders. The work was published in Environment International in January 2018.

== See also ==
- Chris Hines, co-founder
- Sewage discharge in the United Kingdom
- Surfing and environmentalism
