= Wave pool =

Swimming pool with artificial waves

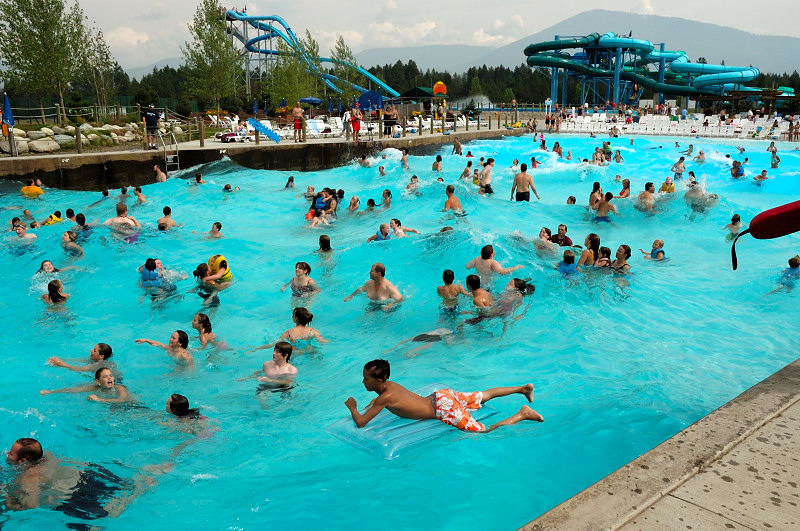
An outdoor wave pool in action

A wave pool is a swimming pool in which there are artificially generated, large waves, similar to those of the ocean. Wave pools are often a major feature of water parks, both indoors and outdoors, as well as some leisure centres.

== History ==
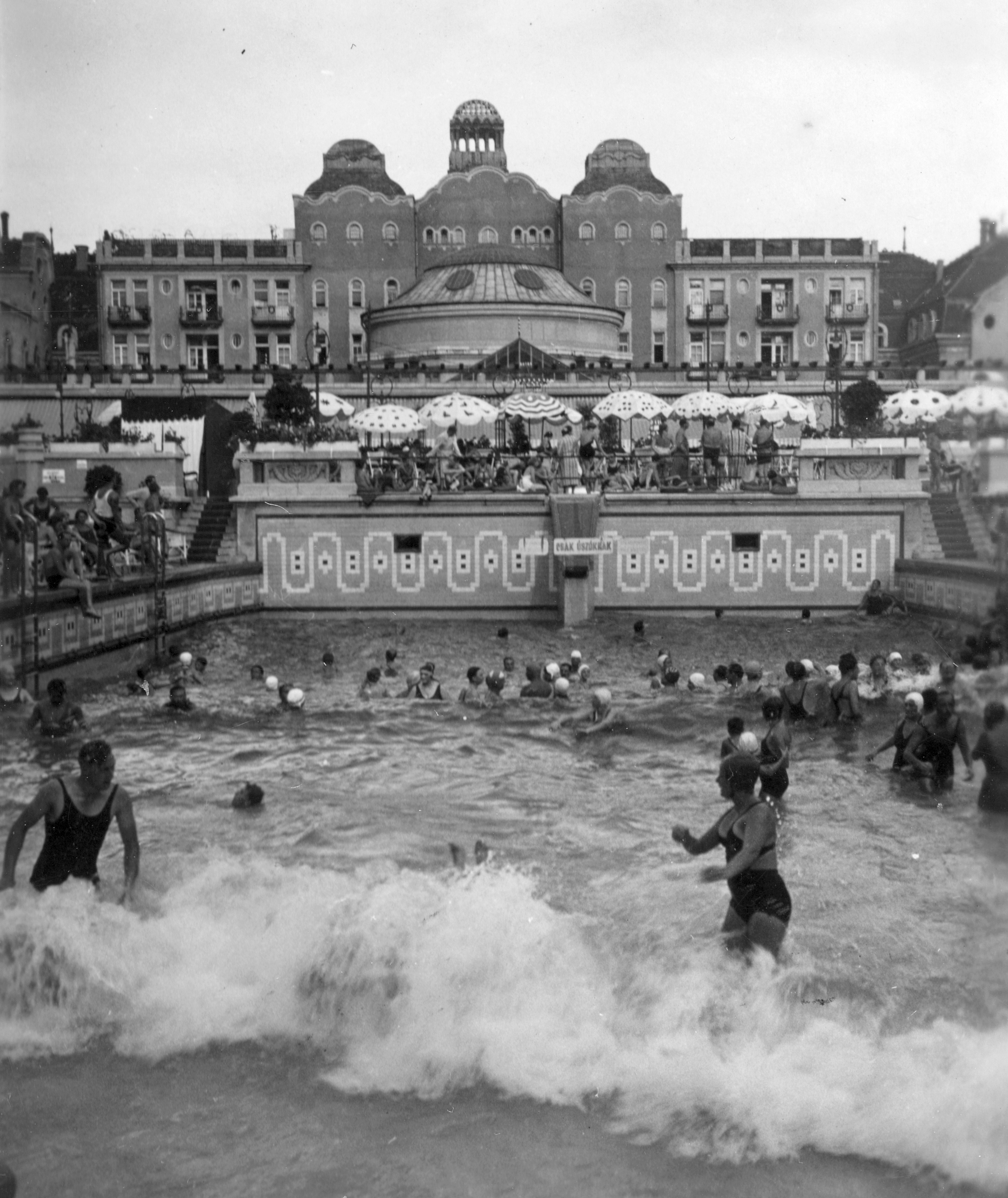
A 1936 photo of the wave pool, constructed six years prior at Gellért Baths in Budapest

The origins of wave pools go as far back as the 19th century, as famous fantasy castle builder Ludwig II of Bavaria electrified a lake to create breaking waves.

In 1905, the "Undosa" swimming platform was built on Lake Starnberg in Germany, which used large pontoons to force the lake water to make waves. It has since been converted into a restaurant.

In 1912, the "Bilzbad" in Radebeul, Germany, was the first public wave pool built on the ground. It used a wave machine, also called "Undosa," first exhibited the previous year at the International Hygiene Exhibition in Dresden. It still operates.

Another early public wave pool was designed and built in 1927 in Budapest, Hungary, in the known Gellért Baths, and appeared in one of James A. Fitzpatrick's documentary Traveltalks films about the city in 1938, as one of the main tourist attractions. It remains open.

The natatorium at Bayocean, Oregon, also had an early wave-generating machine, before it was destroyed by natural ocean waves in 1932.

A 1929 Pathe Pictorial film featured "Indoor Surfers" frolicking in small, artificially-generated waves in a swimming pool in Munich, Germany. The waves were created by agitators which pushed waves through the diving area and into a shallow area where kids were bodysurfing little waves: "This is the new kind of swimming bath that is becoming the rage of Germany," one of the captions reads. "No more placid waters for bathers - the mechanism behind the netting keeps everything moving."

In 1939, a public swimming pool in Wembley, London, was equipped with machines that created wavelets to approximate the soothing ebb and flowing motion of the ocean. In the 1940s, Palisades Amusement Park, located on the Hudson River Palisades across from New York City, installed a large waterfall at one end of its salt water pool, the largest of such in the world at the time, which generated small waves much like those in Wembley.

In 1966, the "Summerland Wavepool" in Akiruno, Japan, was the first wave pool accessible to surfers (though only for 15 minutes every hour).

Several locations claim to have developed the first wave pool in the United States, including Big Surf in Tempe, Arizona, and Point Mallard Park in Decatur, Alabama, which both opened in 1969 (Point Mallard Park opened in 1970 so their claim would have to be inaccurate as is the information previous to this about them.) The first outdoor wave pool in the United States was opened on Memorial Day 1961 (May 29) at Oceana Park in Newbury, Ohio. One of three owners of Oceana Park, Miklos Matrai, holds US Patent 3005207, filed on January 13, 1959, and patented on October 24, 1961, which describes a specially constructed swimming pool having means for producing simulated ocean waves.

The first indoor wave pool in the United States opened in 1982 at the Bolingbrook Aquatic Center in Bolingbrook, Illinois. Opened in 1989, Disney's Typhoon Lagoon is one of the world's largest outdoor wave pools and the strength of the waves makes it possible to bodysurf.

== Operation ==
Wave pools replicate the movement of the ocean in different ways, depending on the size of the pool and the size of wave desired. The mechanism that creates the waves is usually located at the far end of the pool, usually where it is deepest. With some wave pools, the floor can be deeper in front of the wave machine, before quickly rising up, creating the wave shape, for example World Waterpark's Blue Thunder Wave Pool.

- Compressed air. This works by air being blown onto the water in a chamber that has an opening underwater. When the air hits the water, it pushes it down, creating the waves. This can either work by air pumps being programmed to turn on and off to create the waves, or the air pumps constantly blowing with valves that open and close to create the waves.
- Paddle/Panel. A paddle or panel pushes the water, creating the waves. Usually behind the panel is a hydraulic or pneumatic piston that pushes the panel back and forth, in turn pushing the water. This can either work by the panel being on a hinge so it rotates back and forth (in this case the piston pushing it would be on a hinge too), or the panel sitting on rails. This method is becoming increasingly rare, due to the high maintenance it requires. A famous example of this mechanism is World Waterpark's Blue Thunder Wave Pool
- Water tank. This is usually the strongest type of wave machine, utilising large water tanks behind the pool that have water pumped into them, before a valve at its base opens. This allows the water to flow through a channel that slightly angles upwards as it enters the back of the pool, creating sometimes huge waves. When this happens, the wave machine can sometimes make a loud roaring sound, as the air fills the emptying chambers, for example on Disney's Typhoon Lagoon. Famous examples include Siam Park's Wave Palace, holding the record for largest man-made waves at 3.3 metres (11 ft), and the previously mentioned Disney's Typhoon Lagoon.

Other techniques utilize an "accordion mechanism" which opens and closes in order to suck water into its belly (opening) and push it out (closing) to cause waves.

== Types and locations ==
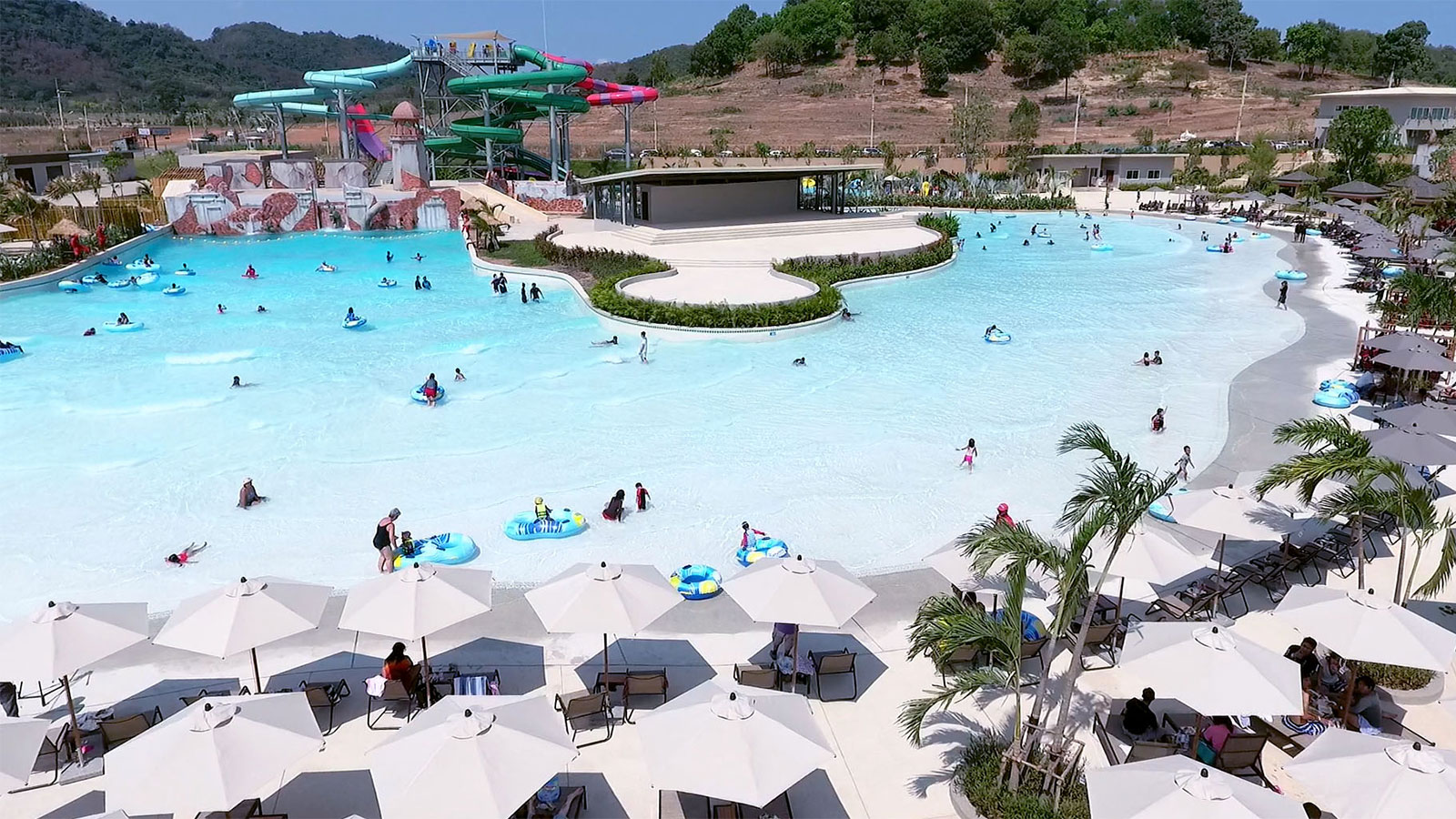
The double wave pool at RamaYana Water Park

Generally, wave pools are designed to use fresh water at inland locations, but some of the largest ones, near other seashore developments, use salt water. Wave pools are typically larger than other recreational swimming pools and for that reason are often in parks or other large, open areas.

Some wave pools like those made by Wavegarden at Lost Shore and NLand are expressly designed for surfing rather than for swimming, and accordingly, create much larger waves. Other surfing wave pool projects, some of which can be in lakes, include Surf Ranch from Kelly Slater Wave Company, Surf Lakes, Webber Wave Pools and Okahina Wave. Surfing can also be done on a static surf simulator but is less realistic than surfing wave pools due to the static wave.

== Safety ==
Wave pools are more difficult to lifeguard than still pools as the moving water (sometimes combined with sun glare) makes it difficult to watch all swimmers. Unlike passive pool safety camera systems, computer-automated drowning detection systems do not work in wave pools. There are also safety concerns in regards to water quality, as wave pools are difficult to chlorinate.

In the 1980s, three people died in the original 8-foot-deep (2.4 m) Tidal Wave pool at New Jersey's Action Park, which also kept the lifeguards busy rescuing patrons who overestimated their swimming ability. On the wave pool's opening day, it is said up to 100 people had to be rescued.

== Record holders ==
The world's largest wave pool by area is 13,600 square metres (146,000 sq ft) and located in Bangkok's Siam Park City.

The largest indoor wave pool, "Blue Thunder", is 42,000 square feet (3,900 m^{2}) and located at World Waterpark in West Edmonton Mall, Edmonton, Alberta.

The world's largest artificial waves, measuring up to 3.3 metres (11 ft) in height, can be found at Siam Park in the Canary Islands.

== See also ==
- Wave tank
